= Pacific Sun v Securities and Futures Commission =

2015 Hong Kong court case

- Judiciary of Hong Kong
- Court: Court of Final Appeal
- Full case name: Pacific Sun Advisors Ltd & Anor v. Securities and Futures Commission
- Decided: 20 March 2015
- Citation: [2015] 18 HKCFAR 138; [2015] 2 HKC 595; FACC 11/2014 (20 March 2015)

Court membership
- Judges sitting: Permanent judges Robert Ribeiro, Robert Tang, and Joseph Fok, and non-permanent judges Frank Stock, and Murray Gleeson

Case opinions
- Decision by: Permanent judge Joseph Fok

Pacific Sun Advisors Ltd & Anor v Securities and Futures Commission was a 2015 case in Hong Kong's Court of Final Appeal. Permanent Justice Fok issued a unanimous opinion which acquitted Pacific Sun and its director and CEO, Andrew Mantel, of charges of advertising a collective investment scheme without the authorisation of the Securities and Futures Commission (SFC). The outcome of this case is that professional advisers no longer need to get an SFC's authorisation to advertise securities that are only sold or intended to be sold to professional investors whether or not this fact is actually stated in the advertisement itself.

== Background ==
Pacific Sun Advisors Limited (Pacific Sun) is an independent investment advisor firm based in Hong Kong. It specialises in alternative investments in Asia with specific concentration in China. It was founded by Andrew Mantel who is currently Pacific Sun's director and CEO.

On or about 2 and 3 November 2011, Pacific Sun sent out an email attached with a press release to a large number of recipients, including prospective investors as well as the SFC itself. The email related to the launch of "Pacific Sun Greater China Equities Fund" (fund), Pacific Sun's new collective investment scheme. The press release together with a presentation on the new fund were made available to the public on the website of Pacific Sun. Pacific Sun had in place a process to screen prospective applicants wishing to invest in the fund to ensure that they were professional investors.

On 6 September 2012, the SFC commenced criminal proceedings against Pacific Sun and Mr. Mantel. The SFC contended that the press release and the presentation should have expressly stated that the fund was available only to professional investors and that the information about the fund should not have been circulated to anyone other than professional investors. The SFC laid information against Pacific Sun under sections 103(1)(b) and 4(b) of the Securities and Futures Ordinance (CAP. 571) (SFO) and against Mr. Mantel under sections 103(1)(b) and 390(1) of the SFO.

== Issue ==
Section 103 of the SFO requires any advertisement, invitation or document containing an invitation to the public to acquire securities or interest in a collective investment scheme to be authorised by the SFC unless it falls within a specified statutory exclusion. The professional investor exemption under section 103(3)(k) permits advertising to be circulated if they are or are intended to be disposed of only to professional investors. The issue in this case concerned the correct scope of the professional investor exemption under section 103(3)(k) of the SFO.

== Case History ==
On 21 March 2013, Magistrate To at the Eastern Magistrates' Courts acquitted Pacific Sun and Mr. Mantel from all counts on two basis. First, the Magistrate concluded that the advertisement was an invitation to the public to seek further information on the fund, not to invest in the fund. Second, the Magistrate found that the fund was intended to be available solely to professional investors, and not to the general public. The SFC appealed the decision by way of Case Stated against the Magistrate's verdict to the Court of First Instance.

On 24 January 2014, Justice Bokhary (as she then was) found that the Magistrate erred in law in respect of the two basis for the acquittal. Justice Bokhary held the terms of the advertisement itself determine whether the professional advisor exemption applies. Second, Justice Bokhary held that the carrying out a screening process to ensure that all investors in the fund were professional investors was irrelevant. Justice Bokhary remitted the mater back to the Magistrates’ Courts for reconsideration. Pacific Sun and Mr. Mantel appealed Justice Bokhary's interpretation of the professional advisor exemption to the Court of Final Appeal.

== Leave to Appeal ==
On 30 September 2014, the Court of Final Appeal granted leave to Pacific Sun and Mr. Mantel to appeal the decision of the Court of First Instance. The Court of Final Appeal delineated the issue to two points of law (i) whether for the professional investor exemption under section 103(3)(k), it must be seen from the advertisement, invitation or document itself, that it is, by its terms, confined to professional investors to the exclusion of other members of the investing public; and (ii) whether the carrying out of a screening process to ensure that all investors investing in the collective investment scheme are professional investors are irrelevant.

== Hearing ==
The appeal to the Court of Final Appeal only concerned the Court of First Instance's interpretation of the professional advisor exemption under section 103(3)(k) of the SFO. The SFC argued that for the professional advisor exemption to apply, the advertisement must expressly state that the investment product is only sold or intended to be only sold to professional investors. The SFC submitted that any other interpretation would defeat the statutory purpose of section 103(3)(k) of the SFO and would be contrary to the goal of protecting of the public. The SFC was represented by senior counsel Mr. Jat Sew-Tong, SBS, SC, JP and junior counsel Mr. Derek C.L. Chan. Pacific Sun and Mr. Mantel argued that the professional advisor exemption applies if the investment product is or is intended to be sold only to professional investors. Counsel for Pacific Sun and Mr. Mantel argued that the burden is on the person issuing or possessing the advertisement to prove, based on the totality of the circumstances, that the advertisement was sold or intended to be sold for professional investors. Pacific Sun and Mr. Mantel were both represented by specialist securities lawyers, Timothy Loh LLP as solicitors and Laurence Li as counsel.

== Decision ==
On 20 March 2015, in a unanimous decision by Permanent Justice Fok, the Court of Final Appeal ruled that the Court of First Instance erred in its interpretation of the professional investor exemption. The Court of Appeal answered “No” to each question. The Court of Final Appeal ruled that there is no requirement under the professional investor exemption that the advertisements or other material contain an express statement affirming that the financial product is only intended to be sold to professional investors. The Court of Final Appeal adopted Pacific Sun and Mr. Mantel's argument that the burden is on the issuer of the advertisement to establish that the investment product is intended only for professional investors. As a result, the professional investor exemption applies to advertisement of investment products that, as a matter of fact, is or is intended to be disposed of only to professional investors whether or not this fact is actually stated in the advertisement itself. The Court of Final Appeal remitted the matter back to the Magistrates’ Courts to be decided according to the legal principles stated by Permanent Justice Fok. The Court of Final Appeal also stated that the original decision of the Eastern Magistrates’ Courts was correct and should not be reversed. Pacific Sun and Mr. Mantel were subsequently acquitted from all charges.

== Aftermath ==
The SFC said in a press release on its website that it would study the decision to determine whether there should be any proposal to amend section 103 of the SFO. As of December 2016, no amendments to section 103 have been proposed.
