= HKSAR v Lai Chee Ying (2021) =

2021 appeal in Hong Kong

- Judiciary of Hong Kong
- Court: Court of Final Appeal
- Full case name: HKSAR v Lai Chee Ying
- Decided: 9 February 2021
- Citation: (2021) 24 HKCFAR 33, [2021] HKCFA 3
- Transcript: text

Case history
- Prior action: HKSAR v Lai Chee Ying HCCP 727/2020; HKSAR v Lai Chee Ying HCCP 738/2020

Court membership
- Judges sitting: Chief Justice Andrew Cheung; permanent judges Roberto Ribeiro and Joseph Fok; non-permanent judges Patrick Chan and Frank Stock

Case opinions
- Decision by: Chief Justice Andrew Cheung

HKSAR v Lai Chee Ying (2021) 24 HKCFAR 33 was an appeal involving points of law by the Department of Justice over the decision of the Court of First Instance (CFI) to grant bail to the founder of Apple Daily Jimmy Lai. The Court of Final Appeal (CFA) reversed the CFI's interpretation of art.42(2) of the Hong Kong national security law.

The Court of Final Appeal displaced the presumption of bail in common law and Hong Kong's Criminal Procedure Ordinance. The CFA held that, with regards to national security offences, the Hong Kong national security law (NSL) carves out a specific exception from the bail regime; the presumption in Article 42(2) of the NSL (NSL 42(2)) being that no bail should be granted. Hong Kong Courts can only consider granting bail if the Court finds sufficient grounds to believe that the accused would not continue to commit offences endangering national security.

== Background ==
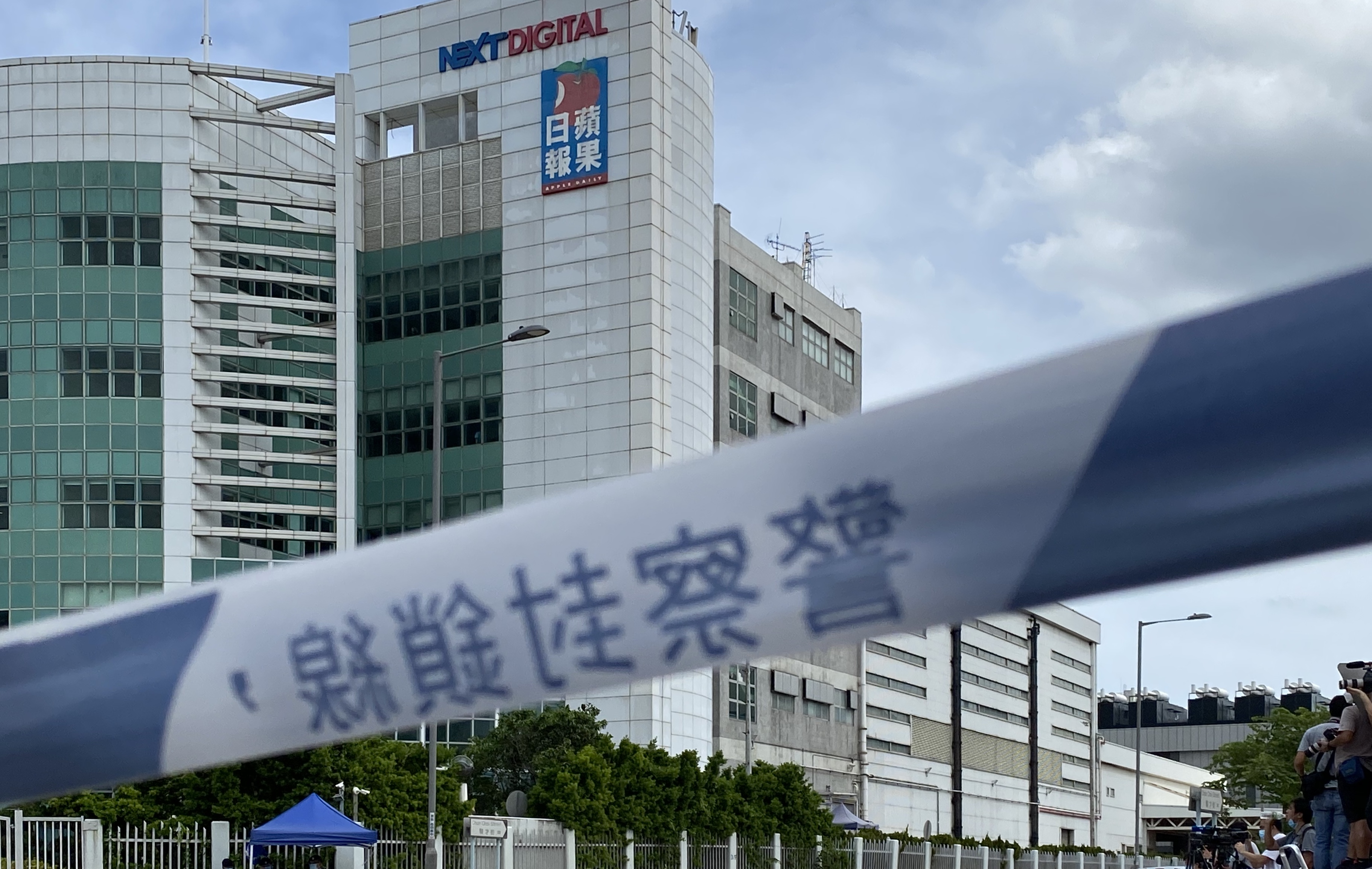
The headquarters of Apple Daily was cordoned off

Executives of Next Digital, the parent company of pro-democracy newspaper Apple Daily, were arrested on 10 August 2020, which its office was raided on the same day. Three were suspected of violating the NSL: founder of Next Digital Jimmy Lai and his son Ian Lai, and CFO Royston Chow. Jimmy Lai's private secretary Mark Simon, a foreign national, was reportedly wanted by the law. Jimmy Lai and his older son Timothy Lai, CEO Cheung Kim-hung, Royston Chow, administrative director Wong Wai-keung, animation director Kith Ng, a total of 6 people were accused for alleged fraud. Jimmy Lai was accused of financing groups advocating sanctions against Hong Kong.

All arrestees were granted bail by the police originally, until 2 December 2020 when Jimmy Lai was arrested again and formally charged with fraud on the next day. He was denied bail by court and remanded in custody. While waiting for bail hearing, Jimmy Lai was further charged with one count of "collusion with a foreign country or with external elements to endanger national security", contrary to art.29(4) of the NSL on 11 December 2020. The Chief Magistrate, Victor So, refused bail and remanded the respondent in custody on the basis that there were substantial grounds for believing that the accused would fail to surrender to custody or commit an offence while on bail.

Lai submitted an appeal to the Court of First Instance. The bail appeal received grave concern from the public. On 23 December 2020, the CFI granted him bail pursuant to section 9J of the Criminal Procedure Ordinance subject to the respondent providing the undertaking offered by him in the strict terms. Despite the conditions of bail were said to be as strict as similar to house arrest, Department of Justice (DOJ) of the Government immediately appealed to the Court of Final Appeal, while pro-Beijing media and government mouthpieces strongly criticised the decision of letting Lai leaving the detention centre. Lai, on 31 December, was sent to jail again after the court decided to consider the appeal, and the government won on 9 February 2021. Subsequent bail application by Lai were denied. He faced additional charges and was jailed for his participation in protests.

== Hearing and rulings ==
The Respondent (Lai) argued that on the principle of legality, a remedial interpretation involving a reading down of NSL 42(2) is required due to intrusion on the presumption of innocence and right to liberty. The Respondent argued that the NSL cannot override the Hong Kong Basic Law or ICCPR, and the Court can deal with its constitutionality by virtue of being entrusted with the power to uphold BL. By placing a burden on the accused to establish that bail should be granted, the Respondent argued that NSL 42(2) derogates from constitutionally protected rights, including the right to bail and the right to personal liberty, and must be justified as being intrusions which are no more than reasonably necessary. The NSL and Basic Law should be construed as a coherent whole and should be construed in a manner which is compatible with, and continues to respect and protect, the fundamental rights accorded by BL and ICCPR. The Respondent further submitted that the Prosecution bears the burden of proof in establishing that bail should not be granted and that nothing in NSL 42(2) changes that.

=== Displacement of presumption of bail ===
The CFA held that the earlier decision to grant appeal by the CFI was to be set aside, on the ground that the lower court had elided the NSL 42(2) question with discretionary considerations under conditions of refusing bail of s.9G the Criminal Procedure Ordinance. The CFA held the lower court misapprehended the nature and effect of the threshold requirement created by NSL; the "double negative" requirement for granting bail in NSL 42(2) was mistranslated into a positive requirement that the court has to be satisfied that there do exist grounds to believe that the accused will continue to commit acts endangering national security as a basis for refusing bail.

The CFA recognised that NSL 42(2) was intended to operate in tandem with constitutional rights, freedoms and other applicable statutory norms, including the rules governing bail in general, as part of a coherent whole, subject to any specific changes effected by NSL 42(2). However, NSL 42(2) carves out a specific exception from the bail regime and introduces a new and more stringent threshold requirement for the grant of bail; the presumption in Article 42(2) of the NSL (NSL 42(2)) being that no bail should be granted. Only when the Court finds sufficient grounds to believe that the accused would not continue to commit offences endangering national security, should the court apply the presumption in favour of bail and proceed to consider all other matters relevant to the grant or refusal of bail.

It was further held that the Prosecution bears no burden of proof in relation to proving that there is no sufficient ground to believe that the accused would not continue to commit offences endangering national security.

=== Jurisdiction of reviewing NSL ===
The CFA applied Ng Ka Ling v Director of Immigration (No 2) and asserted that there is no jurisdiction in the courts of Hong Kong to review the legislative acts of the National People's Congress (NPC) and its Standing Committee (NPCSC) done in accordance with the Basic Law. Therefore, there is no jurisdiction to review the acts of the NPC or NPCSC leading to the promulgation of the NSL on the basis of any alleged constitutional incompatibility and, accordingly, the court had no power to hold any provision of the NSL unconstitutional or invalid as incompatible with the Basic Law or the Hong Kong Bill of Rights Ordinance. The Court regard the promulgation of the NSL was done in accordance with art.18 of the Basic Law on the basis that national security was outside the limits of the HKSAR's autonomy and within the purview of the Central Authorities.

== Effects ==
Subsequent bail application by Jimmy Lai were denied. He faced additional charges and was jailed for his participation in protests.

The CFA in HKSAR v Lai Chee Ying ruled explicitly for the first time that as long as the conditions stipulated in the Basic Law for Chinese organs to exercise power are satisfied, Hong Kong courts have no jurisdiction to review the resulting acts for compatibility with the Basic Law's rights provisions. In effect, the Court closed off the possibility of disapplying an NSL provision or engaging in remedial interpretation thereto, if it finds an NSL provision to be incompatible with the Basic Law.

== See also ==
- Jimmy Lai
- HKSAR v Lai Chee Ying & Others
- Hong Kong National Security Law
- Standing Committee of the National People's Congress
