= Temple Chambers =

Barristers' chambers in Admiralty, Hong Kong

Temple Services Limited
- Headquarters: 16/F, One Pacific Place, 88 Queensway, Admiralty, Hong Kong
- Major practice areas: Arbitration, Banking and Finance, Competition, Equity and Trusts, Insolvency, Intellectual Property, Probate, Public Law, Securities and Regulation, and Technology, Media and Telecommunications (TMT)
- Key people: Paul W. T. Shieh SC (Head of Chambers)
- Date founded: 1977
- Founder: Richard Mills-Owens QC, SC
- Website: www.templechambers.com

Temple Chambers (Chinese: 天博大律師事務所) is a set of barristers' chambers based in Admiralty, Hong Kong. It is widely considered to be one of the leading sets of chambers in Hong Kong given its high ratio of senior counsel and king's counsel to juniors, as well as a strong history of appointments to key judicial and government roles.

== History ==
Temple Chambers was founded in 1977 by Richard Mills-Owens QC, SC.

=== Temple Chambers Moot ===
Inaugurated in 2022, the Temple Chambers Moot is an annual moot court competition hosted by the chambers for undergraduate law students and Juris Doctor (JD) candidates. The competition focuses on advocacy regarding unresolved points of Hong Kong law.

The grand finals are adjudicated by a panel of senior practitioners and members of the Hong Kong judiciary, which included former Chief Justice of the Court of Final Appeal Geoffrey Ma; Justice Godfrey Lam, Justice Anderson Chow, and Justice Thomas Au, Justices of Appeal; and Justice Russell Coleman, Justice of the Court of First Instance.

== Notable members in the judiciary ==
=== Judiciary ===
For the Judiciary, former Senior Counsel are indicated by an asterisk (*).

==== Court of Final Appeal ====
- *The Honourable Mr Justice Geoffrey Ma Tao-li GBM – 2nd Chief Justice of the Court of Final Appeal (retired)
- *The Honourable Mr Justice Roberto Alexandre Vieira Ribeiro GBM – Permanent Judge of the Court of Final Appeal
- *The Honourable Mr Justice Joseph Paul Fok – Permanent Judge of the Court of Final Appeal

==== High Court ====
===== Court of Appeal =====
- The Honourable Madam Justice Maria Candace Yuen Ka-ning – Justice of Appeal of the Court of Appeal (retired)
- *The Honourable Mr Justice Aarif Tyebjee Barma – Justice of Appeal of the Court of Appeal
- The Honourable Mr Justice Thomas Au Hing-cheung – Justice of Appeal of the Court of Appeal
- *The Honourable Mr Justice Godfrey Lam Wan-ho – Justice of Appeal of the Court of Appeal
- *The Honourable Mr Justice Anderson Chow Ka-ming – Justice of Appeal of the Court of Appeal

===== Court of First Instance =====
- *The Honourable Mr Justice Anselmo Trinidad Reyes – Judge of the Court of First Instance (retired)
- The Honourable Mr Justice William Waung Sik-ying – Judge of the Court of First Instance (retired)
- *The Honourable Mr Justice Peter Ng Kar-fai – Judge of the Court of First Instance
- *The Honourable Madam Justice Lisa Wong Kwok-ying – Judge of the Court of First Instance
- *The Honourable Mr Justice Russell Adam Coleman – Judge of the Court of First Instance
- *The Honourable Madam Justice Linda Chan Ching-fan – Judge of the Court of First Instance
- *The Honourable Madam Justice Yvonne Cheng Wai-sum – Judge of the Court of First Instance
- The Honourable Madam Justice Winnie Tsui Wan-wah – Judge of the Court of First Instance
- *The Honourable Mr Justice Mr Eugene Fung Ting-sek – Judge of the Court of First Instance

====== Judge in charge of the Admiralty List ======
- *The Honourable Madam Justice Yvonne Cheng Wai-sum (2025– )

====== Judge in charge of the Constitutional and Administrative Law List ======
- The Honourable Mr Justice Thomas Au Hing-cheung (2012–2019)
- *The Honourable Mr Justice Anderson Chow Ka-ming (2019–21)
- *The Honourable Mr Justice Russell Adam Coleman (2021– )

====== Judge in charge of the Commercial List ======
- *The Honourable Madam Justice Yvonne Cheng Wai-sum (2025– )

====== Judge in charge of the Companies and Insolvency List ======
- The Honourable Madam Justice Maria Candace Yuen Ka-ning (1997–2002)
- *The Honourable Madam Justice Linda Chan Ching-fan (2021–)

====== President of the Lands Tribunal ======
- The Honourable Mr Justice Thomas Au Hing-cheung (2010–2014)
- *The Honourable Madam Justice Lisa Wong Kwok-ying (2019–2025)
- The Honourable Madam Justice Winnie Tsui Wan-wah (2025– )

==== District Court or Lower ====
- His Honour Chua Fi-lan – Judge of the District Court (retired)
- Her Honour Grace Chow Chiu-man – Judge of the District Court

== Notable members in the government ==
=== Government (Executive) ===
- Michael David Thomas CMG, QC, SC – Secretary for Justice (1988–1993)
- Wong Yan-lung GBM, SC – Secretary for Justice (2005–2012)
- Rimsky Yuen Kwok-keung GBM, SC, JP – Secretary for Justice (2012–2018)
- Ronny Tong Ka-wah GBS, QC, SC, JP – Member of the Executive Council (2017–)
- Lawrence Li SC, JP – Chairman of the Financial Services Development Council (2018–)
- Henry Fan SBS, JP – Chairman of the Hospital Authority (2019–)
- Jat Sew-tong SBS, SC, JP – Chairman of the Independent Police Complaints Council (2008-2014)
- Victor Dawes SC – Non-Executive Director of the Securities and Futures Commission (SFC) (2020–)

=== Government (Legislative) ===
- Ronny Tong Ka-wah GBS, QC, SC, JP – Member for New Territories East (2004–2015)

== Other notable members ==
=== Hong Kong Bar Association Chairmen ===
- Ronny Tong Ka-wah GBS, QC, SC, JP (1999–2000)
- Rimsky Yuen Kwok-keung GBM, SC, JP (2007–2008)
- Russell Adam Coleman SC (2009–2010)
- Paul Shieh Wing-tai SC (2013–2014)
- Victor Dawes SC (2022–2024)

=== Hong Kong International Arbitration Centre ===
- Rimsky Yuen Kwok-keung GBM, SC, JP – Chairperson (2020– )

== Head of chambers ==
- Richard Mills-Owens QC, SC
- Roberto Ribeiro QC, SC
- Geoffrey Ma QC, SC
- Ronny Tong QC, SC
- John Bleach QC, SC
- Paul Shieh SC (current)
