= Wally Yeung =

Hong Kong judge (born 1950)

The Honourable Mr Justice Wally Yeung Chun-kuen GBS
- 楊振權

Commissioner on Interception of Communications and Surveillance
- Incumbent
- Assumed office 17 August 2021
- Preceded by: Azizul Rahman Suffiad

Designated National Security Law Judge
- Incumbent
- Assumed office 2021
- Appointed by: Carrie Lam

Vice President of the Court of Appeal of the High Court
- In office 25 July 2011 – 16 August 2021

Justice of Appeal of the Court of Appeal of the High Court
- In office 6 May 2002 – 24 July 2011

Judge of the Court of First Instance of the High Court
- In office 1995–2002

District Judge
- In office 1987–1995

Magistrate
- In office 1986–1987

Personal details
- Born: 1950 (age 75–76) Hong Kong
- Education: University of Hong Kong

Wally Yeung Chun-kuen GBS (Chinese: 楊振權; born 1950) is the Commissioner on Interception of Communications and Surveillance and a retired Hong Kong judge.

== Education ==
Yeung received an LLB in 1974 and a PCLL in 1975 from the University of Hong Kong. During his studies, he was a member of St. John's College.

== Legal and judicial career ==
Yeung was called to the Hong Kong Bar in 1976 and was a barrister in private practice until 1985. He joined the bench as a Permanent Magistrate in 1985 and was promoted to the District Court two years later.

In 1995, Yeung was appointed as a Judge of the High Court of Justice (known as the Court of First Instance of the High Court after the transfer of sovereignty over Hong Kong in 1997). He was elevated to the Court of Appeal on 6 May 2002, along with fellow Court of First Instance judge Maria Yuen.

In 2007, Yeung took over as Chairman of the Commission of Inquiry investigating alleged government interference into academic freedom at the Hong Kong Institute of Education, after Mr Justice Woo Kwok-hing had recused himself to avoid the appearance of partiality. Yeung was appointed because, unlike Woo, he was acquainted with neither Arthur Li nor Fanny Law.

Yeung was appointed as Vice President of the Court of Appeal on 25 July 2011.

In December 2015, on reaching the retirement age of 65, on the recommendation of the Judicial Officers Recommendation Commission, Yeung's term of office was extended for 3 years. In December 2018, his term of office was extended for another 2 years, followed by a further extension until 16 August 2021.

Yeung was awarded the Gold Bauhinia Star on 1 July 2021, in recognition of his dedicated and distinguished service in the Judiciary over the preceding 36 years.

On 23 July 2021, Yeung's appointment by the Chief Executive, on the recommendation of the Chief Justice, as the Commissioner on Interception of Communications and Surveillance was announced. Yeung's appointment took effect on 17 August 2021 (upon his retirement from the bench) for a term of 3 years.

== Major cases ==
=== Legal bilingualism ===
Yeung was one of the pioneers of judicial bilingualism in Hong Kong: in the December 1995 case Sun Er-jo v. Lo Ching & Ors Case No. 3283/1995, he was the first High Court judge to conduct a civil hearing using Cantonese as the language of the courtroom, and the first to use written Chinese to deliver a judgment.

A more controversial ruling of Yeung's was R. v Tam Yuk-ha HCMA 933/1996. Tam had placed a table on the pavement outside her store, and was prosecuted for making an unauthorised "addition" to her premises after having been granted a licence, contrary to Food Business (Urban Council) By-Laws (Cap. 132Y) § 35(a). Yeung overturned the magistrate's ruling of guilt because the Chinese version of the by-law, unlike the English version, did not prohibit "additions" in general but only "building additional construction or building works" (his back-translation of the term "增建工程" used in the Chinese version), and in the event of inability to reconcile the two equally authentic versions of the by-law, he was obligated to choose the interpretation which favoured the defendant. In HKSAR v Tam Yuk-ha HCMA 1385/1996, the Court of Appeal overturned Yeung's ruling and reinstated Tam's conviction on the grounds that the term in question did not merely refer to "construction" but any "erection" of additional works.

Yeung would go on to become the chairman of the Subcommittee on the Translation of Case Precedents, which oversaw a three-month pilot project from January to April 1999 to produce Chinese translations of twenty-five judgments of precedential value identified by the Judiciary, the Bar Association, the Law Society, and the Department of Justice.

=== Occupy sentence ===
On 17 August 2017, Yeung and two other judges of the Court of Appeal, Derek Pang and Jeremy Poon, sentenced the three main leaders in the 2014 Hong Kong protests, Joshua Wong, Alex Chow, and Nathan Law, to six to eight months in prison in the case of Secretary for Justice v. Wong Chi Fung and others CAAR 4/2016; the trio had stormed a fenced-off government forecourt known as "Civic Square" which triggered the 79-day Occupy protests. The ruling sparked widespread fear over Hong Kong's judicial independence, as the Court of Appeal overturned the more lenient sentence of the Court of First Instance after the government pushed for harsher punishments.

=== Others ===
In 1999, Yeung heard a major judicial review case relating to the right of abode in Hong Kong, Lau Kong-yung & Ors v. Director of Immigration HCAL 20/1999. He found that the seventeen mainland-born applicants were not entitled to the right of abode by virtue of their parents' Hong Kong permanent resident status until they had obtained Certificates of Entitlement, and thus refused to overturn the removal order issued against them by the Director of Immigration.

== Public office ==
Yeung was a Fellow of the College Council of St. John's College, University of Hong Kong, and was subsequently the President of the College Council from 2013 to 2021.

Yeung is President of the Society of Rehabilitation and Crime Prevention of Hong Kong.

== Personal life ==
Yeung was born in Hong Kong. He is married to Michelle, with whom he has a son Yeung Jun Wei Wilson (楊浚瑋, born 1991).

Legal offices
New creation	Designated National Security Law Judge; 2021–Present	Incumbent
