= Thomas Au =

Hong Kong judge

The Honourable Mr Justice Thomas Au Hing-cheung JA
- 區慶祥

Justice of Appeal of the Court of Appeal of the High Court of Hong Kong
- Incumbent
- Assumed office 2019

President of the Lands Tribunal
- In office 2010–2014
- Preceded by: Johnson Lam
- Succeeded by: Louis Chan

Judge of the Court of First Instance of the High Court of Hong Kong
- In office 2009–2019

District Judge
- In office 2007–2009

Personal details
- Born: 1963 (age 62–63) Hong Kong
- Education: University of Oxford; University of Hong Kong

Thomas Au Hing-cheung (Chinese: 區慶祥; born 1963) is a Hong Kong judge, currently serving as a justice of appeal of the Court of Appeal of Hong Kong.

== Biography ==
=== Early life ===
Born in Hong Kong in 1963, Au grew up in Hong Kong and received an LLB from the University of Hong Kong in 1996, the BCL from the University of Oxford in 1997, and a PCLL from the University of Hong Kong in 1998.

=== Legal career ===
Au was called to the Hong Kong Bar in 1998, and was in private practice between 1999 and 2007 as a member of Temple Chambers.

In 2007, Au left private practice and joined the bench as a District Judge, before being promoted to the Court of First Instance of the High Court in 2009. He served as President of the Lands Tribunal from 2010 to 2014. He also served as the judge in charge of the Construction and Arbitration List from 2011 until 2 September 2012, when he was appointed as the Judge in charge of the Constitutional and Administrative Law List.

In 2019, Au was elevated to the Court of Appeal.

== Legal profile ==
Due to his young age, and relatively quick rate of promotion since joining the Judiciary, he has been described as a "high flyer" within the Judiciary. He has also described as a judge "with a great sense of humour when not commenting on the law", but who adopted a "technical" approach to his cases.

== Personal life ==
Au was a member of the Civic Party from 2003 to 2006, when he left the party prior to appointment as a full-time judge.
