= Peter Cheung =

Peter Cheung may refer to:

- Cheung Kwok-che (born 1951), also referred as Peter Cheung, member of the Legislative Council of Hong Kong
- Peter Cheung (judge) (born 1952), Hong Kong judge
