= Aarif Barma =

Hong Kong judge

The Honourable Mr Justice Aarif Tyebjee Barma JA

Justice of Appeal of the Court of Appeal of the High Court
- Incumbent
- Assumed office 2012

Judge of the Court of First Instance of the High Court
- In office 2003–2012

Personal details
- Born: 1959 (age 66–67) Mumbai, India
- Education: University of Oxford

Aarif Barma
- Traditional Chinese: 鮑晏明
- Simplified Chinese: 鲍晏明
Transcriptions
Standard Mandarin
- Hanyu Pinyin: Bào Yànmíng
Yue: Cantonese
- Jyutping: baau1 aan3 ming4

The Honourable Mr Justice Aarif Tyebjee Barma (Chinese: 鮑晏明; born 1959) is a Hong Kong judge, and currently serves as Justice of Appeal of the Court of Appeal of Hong Kong.

== Biography ==
=== Early life ===
Born in Mumbai, India, Barma grew up in Hong Kong, where he attended Diocesan Boys' School. He then read law at Exeter College, Oxford obtaining a BA in 1981 and a BCL in 1982.

=== Legal career ===
Barma was called to the Bar at Middle Temple in 1983, and to the Hong Kong Bar later the same year. After doing most of his pupillage in London, he returned to Hong Kong to complete his pupillage and commenced practice there as a barrister at the end of 1984. In 2002, he was appointed Senior Counsel. He was a member of Temple Chambers during his time in private practice.

Barma sat as a Deputy High Court Judge in 2002 and 2003.

In September 2003, Barma was appointed a Judge of the Court of First Instance of the High Court of Hong Kong. He dealt mostly with company, insolvency, commercial and tax cases. In 2012, Barma became the Judge in charge of the Admiralty List.

In November 2012, Barma was appointed a Justice of Appeal of the Court of Appeal of the High Court of Hong Kong.

In September 2015, Barma was elected a Bencher of the Middle Temple.
