= Robert Tang =

The Honourable Robert Tang Kwok-ching GBM, SBS, JP
- 鄧國楨

Non-Permanent Judge of the Hong Kong Court of Final Appeal
- Incumbent
- Assumed office 2018

Permanent Judge of the Hong Kong Court of Final Appeal
- In office 2012–2018
- Preceded by: Kemal Bokhary
- Succeeded by: Andrew Cheung

Non-Permanent Judge of the Hong Kong Court of Final Appeal
- In office 2010–2012

Vice President of the Court of Appeal
- In office 2006–2010

Justice of Appeal of the Court of Appeal
- In office 2005–2006

Judge of the Court of First Instance
- In office 2004–2005

Personal details
- Born: 7 January 1947 Shanghai, Republic of China
- Children: 2
- Education: University of Birmingham
- Occupation: Judge

Robert Tang Ching
- Traditional Chinese: 鄧楨
- Simplified Chinese: 邓桢
Transcriptions
Standard Mandarin
- Hanyu Pinyin: Dèng Zhēn
Yue: Cantonese
- Jyutping: dang6 zing1

Robert Tang Kwok-ching
- Traditional Chinese: 鄧國楨
- Simplified Chinese: 邓国桢
Transcriptions
Standard Mandarin
- Hanyu Pinyin: Dèng Guózhēn
Yue: Cantonese
- Jyutping: dang6 gwok3 zing1

Robert Tang Kwok-ching, GBM, SBS, JP (Chinese: 鄧國楨; born 7 January 1947) is a retired Hong Kong judge. He previously served as a permanent judge of the Court of Final Appeal, and before that, the vice-president of the Court of Appeal in Hong Kong. Following his retirement, he was appointed a non-permanent judge of the Hong Kong Court of Final Appeal.

== Early life and education ==
Born in Shanghai, Robert Tang received his education in England. In 1969, he graduated from the University of Birmingham.

== Legal career ==
Tang began his legal career as a barrister at Gray's Inn in England in 1969. He was called to the Bar in Hong Kong in 1970, the Bar of Victoria, Australia in 1984, and the New York Bar in 1986. Tang was appointed as Queen's Counsel in 1986. In 1992, he was admitted as a barrister in Singapore. From 1988 to 1990 he was Chairman of the Hong Kong Bar Association. During his time in private practice, he was eminently successful and was described by his former pupil and current Chief Justice Geoffrey Ma to have had arguably "the most successful practice” in the profession.

== Judicial career ==
Tang served as a Deputy District Judge in 1982 and as a Deputy High Court Judge in 1986. He was appointed as a Recorder of the High Court in 1995 and appointed a judge of the High Court in April 2004.

He became a Justice of Appeal of the Court of Appeal of Hong Kong on 3 January 2005 and was later appointed as the Vice-President of the Court of Appeal of Hong Kong on 1 November 2006.

He was appointed a non-permanent judge of the Court of Final Appeal on 1 September 2010. He then became a permanent judge of the Court on 25 October 2012.

From October 2012 to September 2018, Tang was a member of the Law Reform Commission of Hong Kong.

On 21 March 2018, the judiciary announced that Tang would be appointed as a non-permanent judge following his retirement; Andrew Cheung was named as his successor in the Court of Final Appeal.

== Family ==
Tang is married to Cissy K. S. Lam and has two children, Hilary and Charles Tang.

== Honours ==
In 2004, Tang was awarded the Silver Bauhinia Star and the Grand Bauhinia Medal 大紫荊勳章 for his judicial service in Hong Kong.

Legal offices
Preceded by Kemal Bokhary	Permanent Judge of the Court of Final Appeal; 2012–2018; With: Patrick Chan (2012–2013); Robert Ribeiro (2012–2018); Joseph Fok (2013–2018)	Succeeded by Andrew Cheung
Order of precedence
Previous: Andrew Cheung; Permanent Judge of the Court of Final Appeal	Hong Kong order of precedence Non-permanent Judge of the Court of Final Appeal	Succeeded by Frank Stock; Non-Permanent Judge of the Court of Final Appeal
