= Judge in charge of the Constitutional and Administrative Law List (Hong Kong) =

Hong Kong judges

The Judge in charge of the Constitutional and Administrative Law List of the Court of First Instance (within the High Court) of Hong Kong, is the most important Law List in that court, given the far-reaching powers of interpreting the Hong Kong Basic Law. As such, the Judge in charge of this list is often considered to be the top judge of the lower court.

== Description ==
The list receives a material public interest in Hong Kong due to the fact that it is the first point of contact for most contentious court cases around issues that have caused public discussion or social unrest, including being in charge of all judicial reviews. These include cases around the Legislative Council oath-taking controversy, the Umbrella Movement, and the 2019–20 Hong Kong protests. In addition, given the important nature of this position, the Judge entrusted with this role is often almost guaranteed to be elevated to the higher courts in the future.

So far, all previous judges in this role have been promoted to at least the Court of Appeal, with many elevated to the Court of Final Appeal. Current justices of the Court of Final Appeal who were once the Judge in charge of this list include Chief Justice Andrew Cheung, permanent judge Johnson Lam and non-permanent justice Frank Stock. Former justices include Michael Hartmann.

== List of Judges ==
#	Name	Tenure	Promoted To (Most Senior Role)	Silk	Ref
1	Sir Brian Richard Keith	1997–99	Justice of Appeal of the High Court (retired)	QC (1989)	
2	Frank Stock, GBS	1999–2000	Non-Permanent Judge of the Court of Final Appeal	QC (1985)	
3	Michael John Hartmann, GBS	2000–08	Non-Permanent Judge of the Court of Final Appeal (retired)		
4	Andrew Cheung Kui-nung, GBM	2008–11	3rd Chief Justice of the Court of Final Appeal		
5	Johnson Lam Man-hon	2011–12	Permanent Judge of the Court of Final Appeal		
6	Thomas Au Hing-cheung	2012–19	Justice of Appeal of the High Court		
7	Anderson Chow Ka-ming	2019–21	Justice of Appeal of the High Court	SC (2004)	
8	Russell Adam Coleman	2021–26	Justice of Appeal of the High Court	SC (2006)	
9	Queeny Au-Yeung Kwai Yue, SBS	2026–	Incumbent		
