= Peter Cheung (judge) =

Hong Kong judge

The Honourable Mr Justice Peter Cheung Chak-yau JA
- 張澤祐

Justice of Appeal of the Court of Appeal of the High Court
- Incumbent
- Assumed office 2001

Judge of the Court of First Instance of the High Court
- In office 1994–2001

District Judge
- In office 1991–1994

Personal details
- Born: 1952 (age 73–74) Hong Kong
- Education: University of London; University of Hong Kong

Peter Cheung Chak-yau (Chinese: 張澤祐; born 1952) is a Hong Kong judge. He has served as a Justice of Appeal of the Court of Appeal since July 2001.

== Education ==
Cheung was educated at St Joseph's College in Hong Kong. He graduated from the University of Hong Kong with an LLB in 1975. He obtained an LLM from the University of London in 1977.

== Legal and judicial career ==
Cheung was called to the Bar at Lincoln's Inn in England in 1976. He was called to the Hong Kong Bar in 1977. He was a barrister in private practice in Hong Kong.

In 1990, Cheung sat as a Deputy District Judge. He was appointed a full-time District Judge in 1991.

In 1994, Cheung was appointed as a High Court Judge.

On 23 July 2001, Cheung was elevated to the Court of Appeal.
