= Derek Pang =

Hong Kong judge (born 1961)

The Honourable Mr Justice Derek Pang Wai-cheong JA
- 彭偉昌

Justice of Appeal of the Court of Appeal of the High Court
- Incumbent
- Assumed office 2015

Designated National Security Law Judge
- Incumbent
- Assumed office 2021
- Appointed by: Carrie Lam

Judge of the Court of First Instance of the High Court
- In office 2009–2015

District Judge
- In office 2000–2009

Personal details
- Born: 1961 (age 64–65) Hong Kong
- Education: Diocesan Preparatory School Diocesan Boys’ School University of East Anglia; University of Hong Kong; Peking University

Derek Pang Wai-cheong (Chinese: 彭偉昌; born 1961) is a Hong Kong judge and has been serving as Justice of Appeal of the Court of Appeal of the High Court of Hong Kong since September 2015.

He is President of the Friends of Scouting of Hong Kong.

== Legal career ==
He was educated at the University of East Anglia (LLB, 1985), the University of Hong Kong (MPA, 1990), and Peking University (LLB, 1995).

He was called to the English and Hong Kong Bar in 1986 and 1987 respectively. He joined the Hong Kong Legal Department as Crown Counsel in 1987, and was promoted to Deputy Principal Government Counsel in 1997.

== Judicial career ==
In 2000, Pang was appointed a District Judge. He was subsequently appointed a Judge of the Court of First Instance of the High Court in 2009. He was made a Justice of Appeal of the Court of Appeal in 2015.

On 21 September 2018, Pang was elected a Bencher of the Middle Temple.

In May 2023, the Congressional-Executive Commission on China (CECC) of the United States Congress suggested the United States government imposing sanctions on Pang to counter the erosion of democratic freedoms in Hong Kong over his handling of Jimmy Lai's national security law case.

Legal offices
New creation	Designated National Security Law Judge; 2021–Present	Incumbent
