= Maria Yuen =

Hong Kong judge (born 1953)

The Honourable Madam Justice Maria Candace Yuen Ka-ning GBS
- 袁家寧

Justice of Appeal of the Court of Appeal of the High Court
- In office 6 May 2002 – 15 December 2023

Judge of the Court of First Instance of the High Court
- In office 1997–2002

Personal details
- Born: 29 December 1953 (age 72) British Hong Kong
- Spouse: Geoffrey Ma
- Education: University of London; University of Hong Kong

Maria Candace Yuen Ka-ning GBS (Chinese: 袁家寧; born 29 December 1953) is a retired Hong Kong judge. She served as a Justice of Appeal of the Court of Appeal from 2002 to 2023.

== Education ==
Yuen was educated at Sacred Heart Canossian College. She graduated from the University of Hong Kong with an LLB in 1975. She obtained an LLM from the University of London in 1976.

== Legal and judicial career ==
Yuen was called to the Bar in Inner Temple in England and the Hong Kong Bar in 1977. She was a barrister in private practice at Temple Chambers. She was Honorary Secretary of the Hong Kong Bar Association from 1983 to 1984.

In 1997, Yuen joined the bench as a Judge of the Court of First Instance of the High Court. She was the Judge in charge of the Companies and Bankruptcy List.

On 6 May 2002, Yuen was elevated to the Court of Appeal. On 15 November 2002, her husband (Geoffrey Ma) was also appointed to the Court of Appeal. The Chief Judge of the High Court (Arthur Leong) announced that they would not sit in the same division when hearing cases in the Court of Appeal. Subsequently, when Ma was appointed Chief Justice of the Court of Final Appeal in 2010, it was announced that he would not hear any appeals from cases in which Yuen has sat, nor would he deal with any administrative matter involving her.

In June 2021, Yuen was recommended for appointment as a permanent judge on Hong Kong's Court of Final Appeal by the Judicial Officers Recommendation Commission. However the promotion was rejected by pro-Beijing legislators, in an unprecedented breach of the norms of an independent legal system. The legislators, who by protocol accept the recommendations of the commission, claimed that she might be influenced by her husband, whose defence of Hong Kong's judicial independence they considered unpatriotic.

Yuen retired on 15 December 2023. In July 2024, she was awarded the Gold Bauhinia Star. Yuen briefly returned to the bench in December 2024, when she sat as a deputy judge of the High Court.
