= Criminal procedure in Hong Kong =

Following the common law system introduced into Hong Kong when it became a Crown colony, Hong Kong's criminal procedural law and the underlying principles are very similar to the one in the UK. Like other common law jurisdictions, Hong Kong follows the principle of presumption of innocence. This principle penetrates the whole system of Hong Kong's criminal procedure and criminal law. Viscount Sankey once described this principle as a 'golden thread'. Therefore, knowing this principle is vital for understanding the criminal procedures practised in Hong Kong.

== Principle of presumption of innocence and its extended rights ==
Apart from case law, Hong Kong also enacted a series of statutes to ensure the principle of presumption of innocence and its extended rights promptly implanted and recognised by the government and the society.

- Hong Kong Bill of Rights Ordinance, Article 11(1) recognises the principle of presumption of innocence:
  Everyone charged with a criminal offence shall have the right to be presumed innocent until proved guilty according to law.
- Hong Kong Bill of Rights Ordinance, Article 11(2)(g) ensures the right against self-incrimination and the right to silence.
  not to be compelled to testify against himself or to confess guilt.
- Hong Kong Bill of Rights Ordinance, Article 5(4) assures the right to request writ of habeas corpus.
  Anyone who is deprived of his liberty by arrest or detention shall be entitled to take proceedings before a court, in order that that court may decide without delay on the lawfulness of his detention and order his release if the detention is not lawful.
- Hong Kong Bill of Rights Ordinance, Article 5(3) enables the right to bail.
  Anyone arrested or detained on a criminal charge shall be brought promptly before a judge or other officer authorized by law to exercise judicial power and shall be entitled to trial within a reasonable time or to release.

== Prosecution ==
=== Right to institute criminal prosecution ===
There is not a rule or law explicitly saying that the absolute right to institute a criminal prosecution is given to the Government. Thus, theoretically, the general public or individuals are allowed to prosecute. Moreover, Section 14 of the Magistrates Ordinance (i.e. Chapter 227) gives guidance on how the Secretary for Justice intervenes and assumes a private criminal prosecution. This provision indeed indirectly points out the possibility of private criminal prosecution. However, practically, private criminal prosecution does not exist because of the expensive costs involved in criminal prosecutions, the lack of manpower, resources, and special statutory powers to carry out a thorough investigation, the exclusive right for the Secretary for Justice to get involved or even take over private criminal prosecutions, the requirement of beyond reasonable doubt of evidence, etc. Consequently, the Secretary is the only one who institutes almost all the criminal prosecutions in Hong Kong. In fact, the Secretary who is the head of the Department of Justice is the person who has the sole power to control all criminal prosecutions independently. The Basic Law, Article 63, describes:

The Department of Justice of the Hong Kong Special Administrative Region shall control criminal prosecutions, free from any interference.

=== Decision to prosecute ===
==== Two questions ====
Before instituting a criminal prosecution, the Secretary or the prosecutor must first address two questions:

- Is the evidence sufficient to justify the institution or continuation of proceedings?
- If it is, does the public interest require a prosecution to be pursued?

==== Discretionary power ====
Criminal Procedure Ordinance Section 15(1) states

The Secretary for Justice shall not be bound to prosecute an accused person in any case in which he may be of opinion that the interests of public justice do not require his interference.

Therefore, the Secretary has discretionary power in determining whether or not to prosecute and is not required to prosecute in every single case. A good example is the well-known controversy involving the former Secretary for Justice, Ms Elsie Leung. In 1999, Ms Elsie Leung refused to prosecute Sally Aw over the circulation fraud at The Standard.

== Apprehension ==
=== Officers being Monitored ===
- The Basic Law, Article 28, states:
  The freedom of the person of Hong Kong residents shall be inviolable. No Hong Kong resident shall be subjected to arbitrary or unlawful arrest, detention or imprisonment. Arbitrary or unlawful search of the body of any resident or deprivation or restriction of the freedom of the person shall be prohibited.
- The Police Force Ordinance, Section 54(1), states:
  If a police officer finds any person in any street or other public place, or on board any vessel, or in any conveyance, at any hour of the day or night, who acts in a suspicious manner, it shall be lawful for the police officer— (a) to stop the person for the purpose of demanding that he produce proof of his identity for inspection by the police officer.

Under Article 28 of the Basic Law, strictly speaking, when a police officer or government agent stops a pedestrian or a car on the street, the officer indeed actually limits and restricts the person's freedom at the very precise moment he or she stops the person. Thus, the officer is required by law to have some reasons in order to be lawful to stop someone on the street. If not, the stop will be considered as unlawful and the officer may be subject to civil lawsuit (tort). Using Section 54(1) of the Police Force Ordinance as an example, one can see how the law regulates and enables a police officer to simply stop a pedestrian. There is no doubt that the law is going to scrutinise every single move a government agent takes to arrest anyone.

=== Power of arrest ===
Many government departments and agencies, like the police force, ICAC, immigration officials etc., have the power to arrest a suspect. This power of arrest is granted and regulated by law. But before an officer can actually arrest anyone, he or she is required by law to request an arrest warrant from a magistrate. If not, the person been wrongfully arrested can sue the officer for damages. The procedure is to protect the public's freedom from the potential abuse of power. Apparently, this is impossible to ask every government agent to request a warrant before arresting anyone in every case, especially in an emergency. For example, it would not be feasible for a police officer to ask for a warrant first and then go back to the crime scene of a bank robbery to arrest the robber. Hence, the law is somewhat flexible when it comes to determining whether or not an arrest is lawful. Still, all is under the control of law. For instance, Section 50 of the Police Force Ordinance considers an arrest to be lawful even without a warrant if:

(1) It shall be lawful for any police officer to apprehend any person who he reasonably believes will be charged with or whom he reasonably suspects of being guilty of—

(a) any offence for which the sentence is fixed by law or for which a person may (on a first conviction for that offence) be sentenced to imprisonment; or
(b) any offence, if it appears to the police officer that service of a summons is impracticable because—
(i) the name of the person is unknown to, and cannot readily be ascertained by, the police officer;
(ii) the police officer has reasonable grounds for doubting whether a name given by the person as his name is his real name;
(iii) the person has failed to give a satisfactory address for service; or
(iv) the police officer has reasonable grounds for doubting whether an address given by the person is a satisfactory address for service.

(1A) A police officer may exercise the power to apprehend a person under subsection (1) without any warrant for that purpose and whether or not he has seen any offence committed ...

=== Warnings ===
- Hong Kong Bill of Rights Ordinance, Article 5(2) requires:

Anyone who is arrested shall be informed, at the time of arrest, of the reasons for his arrest and shall be promptly informed of any charges against him.

This piece of legislation is for the purpose which ensures the person arrested fully understands that his freedom is restricted from that moment. It also prevents the person arrested from attacking the officers because of any misunderstanding. Thus, officers are required to use plain language to inform the person arrested. Using vague words or phrases, like "please come and assist our investigation", does not institute an arrest and can be treated as a mere invitation; the "invited person" may thus kindly refuse. If the officers in an apprehension did not follow any guidance, such conduct could be treated as false imprisonment and the wrongly arrested person could sue for damages.

In addition, from the moment issuing the warning and successfully arrested the accused, it signals the beginning of an apprehension. Within 48 hours of an apprehension, the officers must (1) issue a charge sheet and officially charge the accused or (2) bring the accused before a magistrate for further instruction or (3) let the accused be bailed out, according to the instruction under Section 52(1) of the Police Force Ordinance:

Whenever any person apprehended with or without a warrant is brought to the officer in charge of any police station or a police officer authorized in that behalf by the Commissioner, it shall be lawful for such officer to inquire into the case and unless the offence appears to such officer to be of a serious nature or unless such officer reasonably considers that the person ought to be detained, to discharge the person upon his entering into a recognizance, with or without sureties, for a reasonable amount, to appear before a magistrate or to surrender for service of a warrant of arrest and detention or for discharge at the time and place named in the recognizance; but where such person is detained in custody he shall be brought before a magistrate as soon as practicable, unless within 48 hours of his apprehension a warrant for his arrest and detention under any law relating to deportation is applied for, in which case he may be detained for a period not exceeding 72 hours from the time of such apprehension ...

=== Right to bail ===
Before 1990, admission to bail was not a fundamental right, even though it could be extended from the principle of presumption of innocence. So, back then, if the accused did not know or request to for admitting to bail, the accused could literally be stuck in a police station forever. But in 1991, the law changed. In 1991, the government enacted Hong Kong Bill of Rights Ordinance, Article 5(3), which recognises the right to bail. Like many other fundamental rights, the right to bail is not absolute. Depending on the situation, the police or the prosecutor may refuse the accused from admitting to bail (like, if the prosecutor believes there is a strong possibility that the accused would annoy or threaten any witnesses of the case). Under that situation, the accused may request to bring the question before a magistrate. If the magistrate follows the prosecutor's advice and refuses the accused from admitting to bail, the accused still has the last chance to bring the question to the High Court. By the same token, if the magistrate allows the accused to bail, the prosecutor can also bring the question to the High Court.

After the imposition of the Hong Kong national security law the right to bail has been changed. According to the ruling from the Jimmy Lai case at 09FEB2021 from Court of Final Appeal (Hong Kong), "Article 42 stipulates that no bail shall be granted to a criminal suspect or defendant unless the judge has sufficient grounds for believing he or she will not continue to commit acts endangering national security."

=== Writ of habeas corpus ===
A writ of habeas corpus is a writ issued by a court and has binding effect. The right to request a writ of habeas corpus has its origin in the principle of presumption of innocence. The writ of habeas corpus is to protect individual freedom from arbitrary detention or arrest. The High Court Ordinance, Section 22(A), gives clear guidance on the application for and issue of writs of habeas corpus:

As soon as practicable after receiving an application, the Court of First Instance must inquire into the allegation that the applicant is being unlawfully detained. All proceedings under this section are to be conducted in open court ...

The law does not limit the right to request a writ of habeas corpus to only the accused; some other people can request it on their behalf.

== Choosing the right court ==
=== Categories of crime ===
In Hong Kong, illegal activities are classified into three categories:

Category	Severity	Complexity	Examples
Summary offence	moderate	clear	speeding, littering
Indictable offence	severe	complex	murder, rape
Either way offence, or indictable offence triable summarily	depends	depends	theft; arson

=== Powers of trial courts ===
In Hong Kong, the trial of a criminal offence can take place in one of the three kinds of courts:

Trial court	Maximum sentencing power	Case hearing ability
Magistrate's Court	2 years of imprisonment; Fine $100,000 (if more than one offence at the same time, 3 years of imprisonment)	summary offence; either-way offence
District Court	7 years of imprisonment	summary offence; either-way offence
Court of First Instance of the High Court	life imprisonment	indictable offence; either-way offence

=== Prosecutor's decision ===
In Hong Kong, written rules and laws explicitly define each trial court's rights, powers, responsibilities, and limitations. However, the uniqueness of each criminal case makes it difficult to decide which court a case should be tried. This is especially true for either-way cases. However, since the prosecutor is the one who institutes the prosecution and the proceeding, it makes the prosecutor have the right to choose which court an either-way case should be tried. Consequently, it also indirectly makes the prosecutor have the right to decide the maximum punishment of any given cases.

== Summary proceeding ==
=== Beginning the process ===
In Hong Kong, every criminal case begins at a magistrate's court, regardless of its severity and complexity. But, under the spirit of separation of powers, a magistrate, being part of the judicial branch, has no right to actively start a criminal prosecution and must wait for someone to bring up a complaint before him or her. Thus, the Secretary for Justice must bring a complaint or case before a magistrates' court. The Secretary for Justice can do that by issuing one of the three types of documents:

Document	Case conditions
Notice of prosecution	(1) no apprehension (2) not exceeding 6 months of imprisonment and $10,000 of fine
Information	no apprehension
charge sheet	involved apprehension

=== Notice of prosecution ===
The notice of prosecution must contain information about the accused's name, address, the details of the crime (including time and location), and the related consequences (punishment). After the prosecutor files the notice of prosecution to the court, the prosecutor must mail a copy of the notice to the accused following the detailed guidance provided in Section 7D(1) of the Magistrates Ordinance. Along with the notice, the prosecutor must also provide and enclose a statement of confession and a letter of instruction telling the accused how to institute a legal proceeding if the accused refuses to confess and admit committing the crime. In the letter of instruction, the prosecutor must also provide information about which court will be handling the case, and the deadline for requesting a trial. Provided in Section 7D(2) of the Magistrates Ordinance, the deadline for requesting a public trial must not be fewer than 35 days from the day which the prosecutor files the notice.

Because issuing notice of prosecution as a way to prosecute is only available to very minor offences. The consequences of these offences are most likely to result in paying fines. Therefore, very likely, the accused will pay the fine and return the statement of confession to the court. Still, the accused can request a public trial and follow the instruction provided along with the prosecution notice. If that happens, the following procedure will take place as if the prosecutor has laid an information before the magistrate and asked the court to summons the accused. In addition, if the result, upon conviction, may be more severe consequences other than paying fines, the accused will still be summonsed and must attend the court's hearing.

=== Information and summons ===
Basically, the accused will never see an information. An information is the detailed information related to the offence which the prosecutor lays before a magistrate and requests for a summons to be issued. Thus, all the accused should receive is a summons from the court. In order to ensure the summons is received by and served to the accused, the court is first to mail the summons to the accused. If the accused does not appear and answer in the hearing required by the court, the court will assume the first service fails and will employ a police officer or court clerk to serve the summons to the hand of the accused in person, following the guidance under Section 8(2) of the Magistrates Ordinance.

=== Charge sheet ===
The way to issue and the format of a charge sheet may be different from a notice of prosecution or a summons; still, in essence, a charge sheet has the same functions and contents as a notice of prosecution or a summons. A prosecutor will not issue a charge sheet unless someone has been arrested. A charge sheet must be issued and explained to the accused within 48 hours after the apprehension, according to Section 51 of the Police Ordinance.

=== The importance of the right to be informed ===
- The Basic Law, Article 35, states:
  Hong Kong residents shall have the right to confidential legal advice, access to the courts, choice of lawyers for timely protection of their lawful rights and interests or for representation in the courts, and to judicial remedies.
- The Hong Kong Bill of Rights Ordinance, Article 5(1), states:
  Everyone has the right to liberty and security of person. No one shall be subjected to arbitrary arrest or detention. No one shall be deprived of his liberty except on such grounds and in accordance with such procedure as are established by law.
- The Hong Kong Bill of Rights Ordinance, Article 5(2), states:
  Anyone who is arrested shall be informed, at the time of arrest, of the reasons for his arrest and shall be promptly informed of any charges against him.

From these laws, it is clear that the accused has the very basic right to defense him/herself, seek legal advice and judicial remedies when the accused is facing any criminal charges, apprehension and imprisonment. However, there is one condition: the accused must know what charges he is facing before s/he can take any action. Hence, the prosecutor and the court must inform the accused all the information and ensure that the accused knows and understands the charges against him/her. This principle is further recognised under Section 11(2)(a) of the Hong Kong Bill of Rights Ordinance:

(2) In the determination of any criminal charge against him, everyone shall be entitled to the following minimum guarantees, in full equality—
(a) to be informed promptly and in detail in a language which he understands of the nature and cause of the charge against him ...

== Trial (first stage) ==
=== First hearing (summary) ===
In the first hearing, the magistrate normally does not hear arguments nor conduct formal trial; instead, the magistrate normally reads the charges out loud before the accused and lets the accused have the chance to plead guilty or not guilty. Knowing the fact that the accused has been summonsed and informed of the charges, repeating the charges in open court to the accused seems very repetitive and redundant. In fact, it is necessary. First, the Secretary for Justice has the discretionary power to remove and change charges in between the first hearing and the time the prosecutors first formally issue charges according to the situation, evidence, and findings; thus, repeating charges before the accused can assure and verify the charges he is facing. Moreover, repeating the charges can prevent potential administrative errors (such as mixing up files due to similar names). Lastly, the accused is charged by the government which represents the society; thus, the public have the right to know what crime the accused is involved. As a result, repeating charges before the accused in open court can ensure justice, transparency, and fairness. In conclusion, in the first hearing, one of the following situations is going to happen:

==== Guilty plea ====
If the accused pleads guilty, the prosecutor will present a summary report of the evidence and findings to the court. The magistrate will then read the report out loud and ask the accused whether or not he agrees with the summary. Even though the accused pleads guilty and agrees with the summary report, the magistrate still has the responsibility to ensure that everything fulfils all the required elements for conviction. If the magistrate considers that the prosecutor's findings and the accused's guilty plea are not enough for conviction, the magistrate can acquit the accused disregarding the fact the accused pleads guilty. If the magistrate accepts the report and the guilty plea, the magistrate is required to give the accused the last chance of word to present excuses and reasons in the hope of receiving less severe judgement. After, the magistrate can give judgement or wait for the reports from probation officers and other experts. Under the principle of the last chance of word, the accused has every right to read all the probation reports or other documents and comment on all of them before the magistrate. Then, the magistrate can give final judgement.

==== Not guilty plea with bail ====
If the accused pleads not guilty or innocent, the magistrate will postpone the case and arrange the next hearing. If the accused has been admitted to police bail at the time of the first hearing, the magistrate will normally set the same requirements as the police have set and allow the accused to continue being admitted to bail. Although judicial bail and police bail are the same, they are required to proceed separately under the principle of separation of powers; the accused is thus required to finish all the procedure for transferring the police bail into judicial bail.

==== Not guilty plea without bail ====
If the accused pleads not guilty or innocent and the police have refused the accused from admitting into bail, the magistrate is required to determine whether or not the refusal is reasonable. Under such situation, this very first hearing must be conducted within 48 hours after the apprehension. If not, the prosecutors materially violate the Basic Law and the Hong Kong Human Rights Ordinance and may face lawsuits for false imprisonment.

==== Postponement ====
Under some circumstances, the prosecutors may request the magistrate to postpone the case without asking the question whether or not the accused pleads guilty. The prosecutors may bring such requests to the magistrate when the prosecutors are waiting for the reports from the government laboratory (like, analysis of the purity of illegal drugs) or the decision from the Secretary of transferring the case to the District Court or not. If the magistrate approves such request, the magistrate will arrange the next hearing and deal with the issue of admission to bail.

=== First hearing (indictment) ===
==== Committal proceedings ====
When dealing with indictable offences, the magistrate is not responsible for determining conviction or innocence of the accused, but only for directing cases to other higher courts. Such procedures are called committal proceedings. In a committal proceeding, the magistrate has the responsibility to ensure the severity of the case and the evidence are enough to bring the case to the High Court. If the magistrate thinks the severity and the evidence are not enough to bring the case before the High Court, the magistrate can remove the charges and free the accused; otherwise, the magistrate will transfer the case to the High Court.

Because indictable offences are normally more severe, the Secretary or the prosecutors are normally not ready for a formal committal proceeding in the first hearing. The prosecutors thus usually request the magistrate to postpone the committal proceeding in the first hearing so that the prosecutors can have more time to collect evidence and wait for further instructions from the Secretary. Moreover, the prosecutors are required to provide a package of detailed information to the accused at least 7 days before the formal committal proceeding hearing. According to Sections 80A and 80B (1) of the Magistrates Ordinance, the package includes (1) a copy of the complaint made or information laid before the court, (2) copies of the statements of those witnesses whom the prosecution intends to call at the trial, (3) copies of documentary exhibits, and (4) a list of exhibits.

On the day of committal proceeding, otherwise known as "the return day", the magistrate must follow the guidance provided in the Magistrates Ordinance Sections 80A (4) and 85A(1)(d):

Section 80A(4)

Upon first appointing the return day, the magistrate shall inform the accused—
(a) of his right to apply for legal aid;
(b) that not less than 7 clear days before the return day he will receive a copy of the complaint made or information laid together with copies of witness statements and any documentary evidence in support thereof, being the statements and evidence upon which the prosecutor will seek the accused's committal;
(c) on the return day, he will have the right to require a preliminary inquiry and, if he does so require, he may, at the inquiry, call witnesses to give evidence on his behalf;
(d) where there is more than one charge that, in the event of his requiring a preliminary inquiry on any charge, the inquiry will be held into all the charges against him and that only at the conclusion of the inquiry will he have the opportunity to plead guilty to any charge;
(e) if he does not require a preliminary inquiry, he will be committed for trial without an inquiry unless he pleads guilty to the charge, in which case he will be committed for sentence on that charge.

Section 85A(1)(d)

Say to the accused—

'I must warn you that at your trial you may not be permitted to give evidence of an alibi or call witnesses in support of an alibi unless you have earlier given particulars of the alibi and of the witnesses. You may give those particulars now to this court or to the prosecutor not less than 10 days prior to the commencement of your trial.',

or words to that effect and, if it appears to the magistrate that the accused may not understand the meaning of the term 'alibi', he shall explain it to him.
