= Hong Kong national security judges =

Magistrates adjudicating in security offences

Designated National Security Law Judges
- Chinese: 國安法指定法官
- Literal meaning: national security law designated judges
Transcriptions
Yue: Cantonese
- Yale Romanization: gwok ōn faat jí dihng faat gūn
- Jyutping: gwok^{3} on^{1} faat^{3} zi^{2} ding^{6} faat^{3} gun^{1}

In Hong Kong, designated national security law judges are incumbent magistrates or judges who are further appointed by the chief executive to handle national security offence cases at various levels of the court system. Judges without the designation as given by the chief executive are not allowed to handle these cases.

== Designation ==
The Standing Committee of the National People's Congress of China enacted the Hong Kong national security law on 30 June 2020. Paragraph 3 of Article 44 of the law requires national security offence cases to be handle by "designated judges".

According to the law, the chief executive should designate judges from incumbent magistrates and judges from each level of the court system to handle national security offence cases. Prior to granting the designation, the chief executive may consult the chief justice and the Committee for Safeguarding National Security. The tenure of office as a designated judge is one year.

Moreover, the chief executive is required by the law to not grant the designation to those who have "made any statement or behaved in any manner endangering national security". And the designation can be withdrawn if a designated judge makes any statement or acts in any way that is considered endangering national security.

== List of known judges ==
The complete list of designated judges is not made available to the public as the government believes such revelation poses security threats to the designated judges. However when individual national security cases go through various legal proceedings in open court, the press and the public find out who the presiding designated judges are. Yet, those judges who have been designated but have not yet presided in open court on any national security case are not known to the public. The exact dates of the start and the end of the designation are also unknown to the public.

Here is a table of publicly known current and former designated judges and magistrates:

No.	Judges	Corresponding Courts	Notes
1	Andrew Cheung	Court of Final Appeal	Chief Justice
2	Roberto Ribeiro	Court of Final Appeal	
3	Joseph Fok	Court of Final Appeal	
4	Patrick Chan	Court of Final Appeal	Non-permanent Judge
5	Frank Stock	Court of Final Appeal	Non-permanent Judge
6	Johnson Lam	Court of Appeal; Court of Final Appeal	
7	Jeremy Poon	Court of Appeal	Chief Judge
8	Susan Kwan Shuk-hing	Court of Appeal	Vice President
9	Carlye Chu Fun-ling	Court of Appeal	Vice President
10	Derek Pang	Court of Appeal	
11	Anderson Chow Ka-ming	Court of First Instance; Court of Appeal	
12	Esther Toh Lye-ping	Court of First Instance	
13	Wilson Chan Ka-shun	Court of First Instance	
14	Susana Maria D'Almada Remedios	Court of First Instance	
15	Alex Lee Wan-tang	Court of First Instance	
16	Andrew Chan Hing-wai	Court of First Instance	
17	Johnny Chan Jong-herng	Court of First Instance	
18	Anna Lai Yuen-kee	Court of First Instance	
19	Stanley Chan Kwong-chi	District Court	
20	Amanda Jane Woodcock	District Court	
21	Kwok Wai-kin	District Court	
22	Adriana Noelle Tse Ching	District Court	
23	Ernest Lin Kam-hung	District Court	
24	Amy Chan Wai-mun	District Court	
25	Ada Yim Shun-yee	District Court	
26	Victor So Wai-tak	Magistrates' Court	Chief Magistrate
27	Don So Man-lung	Magistrates' Court	Principal Magistrate (Eastern)
28	Ivy Chui Yee-mei	Magistrates' Court	Principal Magistrate (West Kowloon)
29	Veronica Heung Shuk-han	Magistrates' Court	
30	Andy Cheng Lim-chi	Magistrates' Court	

=== Retired judges ===
Judges	Corresponding Courts	Retired	Notes
Geoffrey Ma	Court of Final Appeal	January 2021	Chief Justice
Wally Yeung	Court of Appeal	August 2021	Vice-President
Joseph To Ho-shing	Magistrates' Court	April 2022	
Peter Law Tak-chuen	Magistrates' Court	October 2023	
Anthea Pang Po-kam	Court of First Instance; Court of Appeal	November 2025	

== Calls for sanctions ==
In May 2023, the CECC called on the US government to sanction 29 Hong Kong national security judges known to be involved in cases. Hong Kong Bar Association chairman Victor Dawes said that any US sanctions against local judges could pose a "real threat" to the ability of the city to hire top-talent judges to combat a manpower shortage.
