= Roberto Ribeiro (judge) =

Hong Kong judge (born 1949)

The Honourable Mr Justice Roberto Alexandre Vieira Ribeiro PJ
- 李義

Permanent Judge of the Court of Final Appeal
- Incumbent
- Assumed office 1 September 2000

Designated National Security Law Judge
- Incumbent
- Assumed office 2020
- Appointed by: Carrie Lam

Justice of Appeal of the Court of Appeal of the High Court
- In office 2000–2000

Judge of the Court of First Instance of the High Court
- In office 1999–2000

Recorder of the Court of First Instance of the High Court
- In office 1997–1999
- Appointed by: Tung Chee-hwa

Personal details
- Born: 20 March 1949 (age 77) British Hong Kong
- Education: London School of Economics

Roberto Ribeiro
- Traditional Chinese: 李義
- Simplified Chinese: 李义
Transcriptions
Standard Mandarin
- Hanyu Pinyin: Lǐ Yì
Yue: Cantonese
- Jyutping: lei5 ji6

Roberto Alexandre Vieira Ribeiro (Chinese: 李義, born 20 March 1949) is a Hong Kong judge and honorary lecturer in law at the University of Hong Kong. He is currently one of the three permanent judges for the Court of Final Appeal in Hong Kong, and is the longest serving judge in that court.

== Early life and education ==
Born into a Macanese family of Portuguese-descent in Hong Kong in 1949, Roberto Alexandre Vieira Ribeiro received his elementary and secondary education in Hong Kong. He studied at La Salle College.

Upon graduating with honours from the London School of Economics (LL.B. 1971, LL.M. 1972), Ribeiro returned to Hong Kong, and joined the faculty of law of the University of Hong Kong as a lecturer in 1972.

He initially taught in the fields of criminal law and jurisprudence, but later extended his teaching to labour law and civil procedure.

== Legal career ==
After seven years of academic life, Ribeiro entered into private practice in 1979, and quickly established himself as an expert in admiralty and maritime law. He was a member of Temple Chambers during his time in private practice. He was appointed Queen's Counsel in 1990, and is a patron of the Oxford University Commonwealth Law Journal. He acted for the British government in the Spycatcher case, and for the Airport Authority during the enquiry into the botched opening of Chek Lap Kok airport in 1998.

=== Judicial career ===
In 1997, Ribeiro was appointed as a Recorder (part-time judge) of the High Court.

Ribeiro quickly rose through the ranks, and was appointed Judge of the High Court in 1999, promoted to the Court of Appeal (High Court) as a Justice of Appeal in 2000, and a Permanent Judge of the Court of Final Appeal the same year.

As the longest-serving judge of the court, Ribeiro has been involved in numerous important cases, particularly in the area of constitutional law. These include cases concerning the Right of Abode, sovereign immunity, freedom of speech, and the election process, but also extend to other areas such as maintenance and champerty, the internet, LGBT rights, civil partnerships, employment, medical negligence, and divorce.

In May 2023, the Congressional-Executive Commission on China (CECC) of the United States Congress said the United States government should consider imposing sanctions on judges over their handling of national security cases, warning that Hong Kong's national security law "created a parallel legal system that weakens judicial independence and strips criminal defendants of basic due process protections available in the existing common law system." Justice Ribeiro has presided over a number of these cases, including that of former Apple Daily owner Jimmy Lai.

In September 2025, Justice Ribeiro was re-appointed to another three-year term as Permanent Judge of The Court of Final Appeal.

== Personal ==
Ribeiro was for many years President of Alliance Française in Hong Kong, and has been a member of the boards of the Hong Kong Arts Festival and the Hong Kong International Film Festival. He has been made an officer of the Légion d'Honneur in France. He is an Honorary Bencher of the Inner Temple in London, and an Honorary Fellow of both the London School of Economics and St Hugh's College, Oxford. He received an Honorary Doctor of Laws degree from the University of Hong Kong in 2019.

Legal offices
| Preceded by Charles Ching | Permanent Judge of the Court of Final Appeal; 2000–present With: Kemal Bokhary (2000–2012); Patrick Chan (2000–2013); Robert Tang (2012–2018); Joseph Fok (2013–present); Andrew Cheung (2018–2021); Johnson Lam (2021–present) | Incumbent |
| New creation | Designated National Security Law Judge; 2020–Present | Incumbent |
Order of precedence
| Preceded by Hermes Tang; Commissioner of Customs and Excise | Hong Kong order of precedence Permanent Judge of the Court of Final Appeal | Succeeded by Joseph Fok; Permanent Judge of the Court of Final Appeal |
