= Joseph Fok =

Hong Kong judge

The Honourable Mr Justice Joseph Paul Fok PJ
- 霍兆剛

Permanent Judge of the Court of Final Appeal
- Incumbent
- Assumed office 21 October 2013

Designated National Security Law Judge
- Incumbent
- Assumed office 2021
- Appointed by: Carrie Lam

Justice of Appeal of the Court of Appeal of the High Court
- In office 2011–2013

Judge of the Court of First Instance of the High Court
- In office 2010–2011

Recorder of the Court of First Instance of the High Court
- In office 2003–2009

Personal details
- Born: 24 September 1962 (age 64) Hong Kong
- Parent(s): Dr Alison Bell Fok and Dr Peter Hin-tak Fok
- Education: University College London

Joseph Paul Fok
- Traditional Chinese: 霍兆剛
- Simplified Chinese: 霍兆刚
Transcriptions
Standard Mandarin
- Hanyu Pinyin: Huò Zhàogāng
Yue: Cantonese
- Jyutping: fok3 siu6 gong1

Joseph Paul Fok (Chinese: 霍兆剛, born 24 September 1962) is a Permanent Judge of the Hong Kong Court of Final Appeal.

== Early life ==
Fok is one of five children of Dr Alison Bell and Dr Peter Fok Hin-tak.

Fok obtained a Bachelor of Laws with honours from University College London in the United Kingdom in 1984. He attended the Inns of Court School of Law and passed the Bar Examination in 1985. He was called to the English Bar in 1985 and to the Hong Kong Bar in 1986.

== Legal career ==
Fok was in private practice in Hong Kong from January 1987, and on a part-time ad hoc basis in Singapore between March 2002 and March 2006. He was appointed Senior Counsel in 1999. He was a member of Temple Chambers.

== Judicial career ==
Fok was appointed a Recorder of the Court of First Instance of the High Court from 2003 to 2009.

On 1 July 2006, Fok was appointed a justice of the peace.

He joined the Judiciary as a Judge of the Court of First Instance of the High Court on 1 February 2010. Fok was appointed a Justice of Appeal of the Court of Appeal of the High Court on 1 February 2011.

He was appointed a Permanent Judge of the Court of Final Appeal in 2013, replacing Mr Justice Patrick Chan. At 51 years and 28 days, he was the third youngest-ever judge to be appointed to the Court of Final Appeal, behind Kemal Bokhary and Andrew Li.

On 25 September 2015, Fok was elected a Bencher of the Middle Temple.

In May 2023, the Congressional-Executive Commission on China (CECC) of the United States Congress suggested the United States government imposing sanctions on Fok to counter the erosion of democratic freedoms in Hong Kong over his handling of Jimmy Lai's national security law case.

Legal offices
Preceded by Patrick Chan	Permanent Judge of the Court of Final Appeal; 2013–present Served alongside: Robert Ribeiro, Robert Tang, Andrew Cheung	Incumbent
New creation	Designated National Security Law Judge; 2021–Present	Incumbent
Order of precedence
Previous: Robert Ribeiro; Permanent Judge of the Court of Final Appeal	Hong Kong order of precedence Permanent Judge of the Court of Final Appeal	Succeeded by Position currently vacant Permanent Judge of the Court of Final Appeal
