= Hong Kong Court of Final Appeal =

Final appellate court of Hong Kong

- 香港特別行政區終審法院
- The logo features the Court of Final Appeal Building
- Interactive map of Hong Kong Court of Final Appeal
- 22°16′51″N 114°09′37″E
- Established: 1 July 1997; 29 years ago
- Location: 8 Jackson Road, Central, Hong Kong
- Coordinates: 22°16′51″N 114°09′37″E
- Composition method: Appointment by the Chief Executive acting in accordance with the recommendation of the Judicial Officers Recommendation Commission with Legislative Council endorsement
- Authorised by: Hong Kong Basic Law; Hong Kong Court of Final Appeal Ordinance
- Judge term length: Until retirement age of 70 for the Chief Justice and Permanent Judges, but this may be extended by two three-year terms, meaning retirement age can be extended to 76; no retirement age for non-permanent judges
- Number of positions: One Chief Justice, at least three permanent judges and at most 30 non-permanent judges
- Website: hkcfa.hk

Chief Justice of the Court of Final Appeal
- Currently: Andrew Cheung
- Since: 11 January 2021

Hong Kong Court of Final Appeal
- Traditional Chinese: 香港終審法院
- Simplified Chinese: 香港终审法院
Transcriptions
Standard Mandarin
- Hanyu Pinyin: Xiānggǎng Zhōngshěnfǎyuàn
Yue: Cantonese
- Yale Romanization: Hēung góng jūng sám faat yuhn
- Jyutping: Hoeng^{1} gong^{2} zung^{1} sam^{2} faat^{3} jyun^{6}

The Hong Kong Court of Final Appeal (HKCFA) is the final appellate court of Hong Kong.

The Court of Final Appeal was established on 1 July 1997, upon the establishment of the Hong Kong Special Administrative Region; the court replaced the Judicial Committee of the Privy Council as the highest judicial institution of the jurisdiction of Hong Kong. As defined in Articles 19 and 85 of the Hong Kong Basic Law, the Court of Final Appeal "exercises judicial power in the Region independently and free from any interference." The Hong Kong Court of Final Appeal Ordinance and the Hong Kong Court of Final Appeal Rules set out the detailed functions and procedures of the court.

The hierarchy of the Hong Kong judiciary from high to low is: the Court of Final Appeal, the High Court (consisting of the upper Court of Appeal and the lower Court of First Instance), the District Court, and magistrates' courts.

The court meets in the Court of Final Appeal Building located in Central, Hong Kong. Court cases can be viewed online through live broadcast and webcast playback from April 2025 onward under a pilot scheme of 2 years.

== History ==
=== Background and conception ===
From the 1840s until the handover of Hong Kong on 1 July 1997, Hong Kong was a British Dependent Territory, and the power of final adjudication on the laws of Hong Kong rested with the Judicial Committee of the Privy Council in London.

The notion that Hong Kong should have a court of final appeal likely arose at some point in the early 1980s, during the Sino-British negotiations on the future of Hong Kong. Wong Man Fong, then a senior official at Xinhua News Agency, described himself as being part of a small policy task force in January 1982 that came up with twelve policy points that Beijing would adopt for Hong Kong, among them the agreement in the Sino-British Joint Declaration in 1984 that Hong Kong should be vested with "independent judicial power, including that of final adjudication", which was in line with China's stated principle of "Hong Kong people ruling Hong Kong". While it was reported that the Chinese government had considered having the court in Beijing, the idea was rejected by Deng Xiaoping before the second round of talks in 1983.

=== Creation of the court ===
The Sino-British Joint Liaison Group agreed in 1991 that the Court of Final Appeal—consisting of a chief justice, three other Hong Kong judges, and one judge from a list of Hong Kong or foreign common law judges—should be set up before the handover on 1 July 1997, preferably by 1993, in order to lay the groundwork for a smooth transition. The decision to include only one foreign judge led to much criticism; Martin Lee asserted that while he was a member of the Basic Law Drafting Committee, it had been agreed that a majority of the judges sitting on the court would be foreign, and in any case, it appeared to be a contradiction of the meaning in the Joint Declaration and Basic Law suggested by the word "judges". The Bar Association and Law Society opposed the agreement, criticizing it for contravening both the spirit and the letter of the Joint Declaration and Basic Law. There were also concerns that the new CFA would need to be of similar stature and prestige as the Privy Council, and not simply the Court of Appeal in a different guise, in order to preserve confidence in Hong Kong's business environment and legal system.

The Legislative Council voted 38–2 on 25 October 1991 in rejection of the agreement, the first time it had voted in opposition to an agreement between Britain and China on the future of Hong Kong.

== Role of the court ==
Based on the one country, two systems principle, Hong Kong retains a high degree of autonomy and, in most areas, maintains its own legal system.

The Court of Final Appeal was established on 1 July 1997 and since then, it has served as the court of last resort. The court has the power of final adjudication with respect to the law of Hong Kong as well as the power of final interpretation over local laws—including the power to strike down local ordinances on the grounds of their inconsistency with the Basic Law.

The court's decisions can, however, be overturned by the Chinese government via a controversial process known as an "interpretation" via Article 158 of the Basic Law.

The Court of Final Appeal has no original jurisdiction; an appeal has to originate from the High Court (either from the Court of Appeal or, more rarely, from the Court of First Instance).

== Court structure ==
=== Judges ===
The Court of Final Appeal is made up of the Chief Justice, at least three Permanent Judges, and at most 30 non-permanent Judges who can come from Hong Kong or from any overseas common law jurisdiction. Under the Basic Law, Hong Kong remains a common law jurisdiction; Article 92 of the Basic Law allows judges from other common law jurisdictions to be recruited and serve in the judiciary as non-permanent judges (NPJs). To date, NPJs appointed to the court have served in the judiciaries of England and Wales, Australia, New Zealand, Canada, and Scotland. Aside from the Chief Justice, there is no nationality requirement for any of the permanent or non-permanent judges.

==== Demographics ====
As of 2025, no woman has ever served as Chief Justice or as a permanent judge. Baroness Hale and Beverly McLachlin, who were both appointed as overseas non-permanent judges on 30 July 2018, were the first women to sit on the court.

Since 1997, a total of 11 individuals have held positions as chief justice or permanent judge. Of these, 8 obtained their law degree in the United Kingdom, including 2 from Oxford University (Henry Litton and Charles Ching) and 1 from Cambridge University (Andrew Li)). 3 judges graduated from the University of Hong Kong (Andrew Cheung, Patrick Chan and Johnson Lam). Andrew Cheung also holds a Master of Laws from Harvard University, making him the only judge with a degree from the United States. Of the 11, eight of the judges were previously QCs or SCs.

With the exception of Henry Litton, Joseph Fok and Roberto Ribeiro, who are Eurasian, and Kemal Bokhary, who is of Pakistani descent, all permanent judges have been of Chinese ethnicity, including each of the chief justices.

=== Judicial assistants ===
Since 2009, under the auspices of the then-Chief Justice Andrew Li, judicial assistants have been appointed to provide legal support and research assistance to the judges of the court.

=== Registrar ===
There is also a registrar attached to the Court of Final Appeal, who assists with review of appeal applications and other administrative duties. The registrar is usually recruited from the district court level. The list of registrars and their dates of appointment is as follows:

1. Edward Timothy Starbuck Woolley (1997–1999)
2. Christopher Chan Cheuk (1999–2000, acting)
3. Betty Kwan Ka-ching (2000–2002, acting)
4. Queeny Au-yeung Kwai-yue (2002–2007, acting)
5. Simon Kwang Cheok-weung (2014–2018; acting from August 2007 to March 2014)
6. Wong King-wah (since June 2023; acting from September 2018 to May 2023).

== Procedure ==
=== Permitting an appeal ===
Whether a prospective appellant is permitted to appeal or not is determined by a panel of three Hong Kong judges, usually the Chief Justice and two other permanent judges. Should the Chief Justice or a permanent judge not be available, the other permanent judge or a non-permanent judge from Hong Kong may be called in. Non-permanent judges from other jurisdictions do not sit on such panels.

=== Hearing an appeal ===
All appeal cases are heard by a bench of five judges consisting of the Chief Justice, three permanent judges and a non-permanent judge from another common law jurisdiction. If the Chief Justice does not sit in an appeal, a permanent judge is designated to sit in the Chief Justice's place, and a non-permanent judge from Hong Kong will sit on the court as well. Similarly, if a permanent judge is unable to sit, a non-permanent Hong Kong judge will sit in place of that permanent judge. Technically, should a non-permanent judge from outside Hong Kong be unable to attend due to extraordinary circumstances (such as during the COVID-19 pandemic), two non-permanent Hong Kong judges may sit on the court or, or the overseas judge may sit via video conferencing.

As the role of a non-permanent judge is not a full time role, a serving High Court judge may be appointed as a non-permanent judge concurrently, such as Vice-President Robert Tang and Vice-President Frank Stock, as they were then known. This is extended only to the most eminent and senior serving High Court justices. There is no mandatory retirement age for a non-permanent judge.

Since the enactment of the National Security Law in 2020, no foreign non-permanent judges has sat during a National Security case, being replaced instead by designated Hong Kong non-permanent judges (not all local non-permanent judges have been designated to sit on NSL cases). As there is no nationality requirement regarding the judges that are eligible for designation as designated judges, it is remains unclear whether overseas NPJs have not participated because they have not been designated for such cases or because they have declined to do so.

== Current court ==
=== The Cheung Court ===
The Cheung Court began on 11 January 2021, when Andrew Cheung began his tenure as the 3rd Chief Justice. Currently, 14 justices serve on the Cheung Court, including the Chief Justice, 3 Permanent Judges, and 10 non-permanent judges (6 of whom are from other common law jurisdictions). It is the first court to be led by a Chief Justice who did not receive a legal degree in the United Kingdom; Andrew Cheung received his LLB from the University of Hong Kong and the LLM from Harvard Law School. It is also the first court to be led by a Chief Justice who has never taken silk. Andrew Cheung has been described as a "conservative", in contrast to his relatively liberal predecessors as Chief Justice. Nonetheless, the Cheung court has issued a number of liberal decisions, especially in the field of LGBT rights.

Cheung assumed the role of Chief Justice in the wake of the 2019–2020 Hong Kong protests, and immediately following the enactment of the highly controversial 2020 Hong Kong national security law. As a result, Cheung's tenure as Chief Justice has been underlaid by concerns regarding the rule of law in Hong Kong and the independence of Hong Kong's judiciary, with a record number of overseas non-permanent judges stepping down from the court between 2021 and 2024. Some of these judges have spoken publicly about their concerns over the function and independence of the court, and how it has changed with the legal changes imposed upon the island by the national government in Beijing. Nevertheless, during Cheung's tenure, three overseas non-permanent judges, Patrick Keane and James Allsop (Australia) and Sir William Young (NZ), have joined the CFA, and some of the other overseas non-permanent judges have renewed their appointments. Appointment to the court is considered a valuable and rewarding accoutrement to the career of a Commonwealth judge, and the work and employment arrangements often suit recently retired judges. In recent decades, such appointees have often sought to extend their appointments, for many years if they are able. However the rate and number of departures has noticeably increased since 2020.

==== Permanent members of the court ====
- The Hon. Chief Justice Andrew Cheung (since January 2021; first appointed Permanent Judge in October 2018)
- The Hon. Mr. Justice Roberto Ribeiro (since September 2000)
- The Hon. Mr. Justice Joseph Fok (since October 2013)
- The Hon. Mr. Justice Johnson Lam (since July 2021)

==== Notable recent rulings of the court ====
The Cheung Court was the first CFA bench to hear substantive final appeals arising from the 2020 National Security Law. The Cheung Court has issued landmark decisions on the competency of Hong Kong courts to review acts of the national legislature, LGBT rights, the Bill of Rights, national security, freedoms of expression and assembly, the freedom of the press, and commercial law. Major decisions of the Cheung court include:

- HKSAR v. Lai Chee Ying (2021): In a per curiam decision, the Court displaced the presumption of bail in common law and the Criminal Procedure Ordinance, holding that, with regard to national security offences, the NSL carves out a specific exception from the bail regime; the presumption in Article 42(2) of the NSL being that no bail should be granted. Hong Kong courts can only consider granting bail if the court finds sufficient grounds to believe that the accused would not continue to commit offences endangering national security.
- Secretary for Justice v Timothy Wynn Owen KC (2021): This was a leave determination of the Appeal Committee of the CFA, which arose in the context of Jimmy Lai's trial under the National Security Law and his application to be represented by Tim Owen KC, an English barrister, for which court permission is required in Hong Kong. Ruling in favour of Lai, Chief Justice Cheung together with Ribeiro and Fok PJJ granted ad hoc admission to Owen to represent Lai and rejected the Justice Secretary’s application for leave to appeal the lower courts’ rulings. The Secretary had challenged the public interest considerations supporting Owen's admission in the lower courts, but later introduced a new argument before the CFA, advocating for a blanket ban on overseas counsel in national security cases. The CFA rejected this new argument, citing the principle that new issues cannot be raised on appeal if they compromise fairness or the court's ability to adjudicate. However, the CFA decision was later controversially overturned by the Standing Committee of the National People's Congress of China, exercising its power under Article 158 of the Basic Law.
- Q v. Commissioner of Registration (2023): In a unanimous decision jointly written by Mr Justice Ribeiro PJ and Mr Justice Fok PJ, the Court held that the government's policy of requiring trans men (female to male transgender persons) to undergo full sex reassignment surgery as a necessary condition for altering gender markers on Hong Kong Identity Cards violated Article 14 of the Bill of Rights and was unconstitutional.
- Sham Tsz Kit v. Secretary for Justice (2023): In a 3–2 decision, the Court ordered the government to establish an alternative framework for the legal recognition of same-sex relationships, with equivalent rights and obligations to marriage, within two years of the ruling. However, the court also unanimously held that same-sex couples do not have a constitutionally guaranteed right to marry.
- HKSAR v Choy Yuk Ling (2023): In an important decision on the freedom of the press, the CFA unanimously quashed the conviction of a journalist, Bao Choy. Choy was convicted in 2021 for allegedly making false statements in her applications for vehicle registry records, used to investigate the transport of weapons linked to a controversial attack on pro-democracy protestors during the 2019-2020 Hong Kong protests. Her purpose was recorded as “[o]ther traffic and transport related matters,” which lower courts deemed false, stating her true purpose was investigative journalism. Fok PJ held that while the Commissioner for Transport was entitled to require applicants to state their purpose, the phrase “[o]ther traffic and transport related matters” could reasonably include investigative journalism related to a vehicle’s use in a crime — particularly given constitutional protections for press freedom. The Court also found it was not an irresistible inference that the Appellant knowingly made a false statement, as she could have honestly believed her purpose fit within the stated category, and thus allowed Choy's appeal. The decision was welcomed by the International Federation of Journalists, and described as a "significant ruling for press freedom" by the media.
- C v D (2023): In a landmark decision on arbitration law, Chief Justice Cheung, Ribeiro, Fok and Lam PJJ dismissed the appellant's challenge to an arbitral tribunal’s determination that a pre-condition to arbitrate had been satisfied. This case is the first in any Model Law jurisdiction to address at the final appellate level the extent to which courts can intervene under Article 34(2)(a)(iii) of the Model Law regarding pre-arbitration conditions. The Court adopted a distinction between “jurisdiction” (which courts may review) and “admissibility” (which courts cannot), holding that disputes over pre-arbitration conditions are presumptively issues of admissibility unless clear and unequivocal language indicates otherwise. Gummow NPJ dissented, rejecting the jurisdiction/admissibility distinction and arguing that all challenges should be assessed directly under Article 34(2)(a)(iii).
- China Life Trustees v China Energy Reserve and Chemicals Group Overseas (2024): the CFA addressed the principles of Quistclose trusts for the first time, in the context of corporate insolvencies and restructurings. The case concerned US$120 million injected into SPV1 by the treasury entity of the China Energy Group to repay bonds owed by SPV2. When the funds were not used for this purpose and the Group defaulted, the CFA had to determine if the funds were held on a Quistclose trust. The Court unanimously found that such a trust existed, holding that the parties intended the funds to be used only for a specific purpose and not at SPV1’s free disposal. Ribeiro PJ clarified that an express restriction or intent to retain beneficial interest was unnecessary, while Gummow NPJ cautioned against rigid labels, emphasizing that the Quistclose trust is not a new type of trust. Cheung CJ further distinguished between the parties’ intentions and the legal consequences.
- HKSAR v Chow Hang-tung (2024): The Court unanimously restored Chow Hang Tung's conviction for "incitement to knowingly take part in an unauthorised assembly" for her role in the 2021 June-Fourth vigil. However, the Court was split 3–2 on whether Chow could challenge the legality of the police's ban by way of defence. Judges Joseph Fok, Roberto Ribeiro and Murray Gleeson held that there is a strong presumption in favour of allowing non-constitutional ("collateral") grounds of challenge by way of defence, and it would take very clear words to deprive a defendant of an opportunity to challenge the validity of the prohibition. Constitutional challenges by way of defence would be allowed as long as the constitutionality of the prohibition is an essential element of the offence. However, the prohibition was found to be proportionate, and that section 9(4) of the Public Order Ordinance did not impose a positive duty on the Commissioner of Police to proactively devise and propose conditions to enable the public assembly to take place.
- HKSAR v Ng Ngoi-yee Margaret (2024): In a unanimous decision, the Court dismissed the appeals of 7 prominent democratic politicians against their convictions for "knowingly taking part in an unauthorized assembly" during a protest in 2019. In his concurring judgment, Lord Neuberger NPJ agreed with the main judgment's focus on the Hong Kong constitutional framework but noted that the test for proportionality in restricting fundamental rights aligns with the approach adopted by Lord Reed in the UK Supreme Court decision Abortion Services [2022] UKSC 32.
- Nick Infinger v The Hong Kong Housing Authority (2024): In a unanimous decision penned by Chief Justice Cheung, the Court found that the Housing Authority (HA)'s policy of excluding same-sex couples from access to public rental housing units and the Home Ownership Scheme was unconstitutional. The Chief Justice emphasised that the HA’s policies failed the tests of necessity and proportionality, given that they completely excluded same-sex couples from public housing schemes for ordinary families. The HA provided no evidence that this exclusion would significantly impact housing availability for traditional families or their plans. Moreover, it offered no justification for why less restrictive measures, such as prioritising opposite-sex married couples or those with children while still allowing same-sex couples to apply, could not be adopted. The decision was welcomed by Jerome Yau, co-founder of Hong Kong Marriage Equality, who told the media that “the court made it very clear that same-sex marriage is just the same as heterosexual marriage”. Hong Kong Marriage Equality called on the government to immediately end the exclusion of same-sex couples from marriage.
- HKSAR v Tang Ngok Kwan, Tsui Hon Kwong, and Chow Hang-tung (2025): The Court unanimously allowed the appeals of the three appellants, who were the organizers of a candlelit vigil for victims of the 1989 Tiananmen Square protests and massacre, and quashed their convictions for failing to comply with notices issued under Schedule 5, Section 3(3) of the Implementation Rules for Article 43 of the National Security Law (NSL). The case centred on whether the appellants, as office-bearers of the Hong Kong Alliance in Support of Patriotic Democratic Movements of China, were lawfully required to provide information to the police under the NSL. The Court cited the use of documents by the prosecution that were “heavily redacted” as a key plank in its decision, noting that the "redactions were not only self-defeating by removing from evidence the only material relied upon for establishing that the [Alliance] were foreign agents, but also made it impossible for the Appellants to have a fair trial as they were deprived of all knowledge as to the nature of the prosecution’s case on an essential element of the offense".

== Controversies ==
=== Article 158 interpretation ===
The controversial power of final interpretation of "national" law including the Basic Law is vested in the Standing Committee of the National People's Congress of China (NPCSC) by virtue of Article 158 of the Basic Law and by the Constitution of the PRC; however, "national" laws which are not explicitly listed in Annex III of the Basic Law are not operative in Hong Kong. Since 2020, Article 158 interpretations may also be applied to the Hong Kong national security law.

Article 158 delegates such power to the courts of Hong Kong for interpretation while handling court cases. Although this arrangement has attracted criticism of "undermining judicial independence", an interpretation by the NPCSC does not affect any court judgments already rendered. This practice is highly controversial as it contradicts the power of final adjudication; the first time an interpretation occurred in 1999, all five judges (including the Chief Justice, all three permanent justices and one non-permanent justice) involved in the case of Ng Ka Ling v Director of Immigration reportedly considered quitting the top court in protest. The judges ultimately did not quit, as "the justices feared they would be replaced by less independent or competent jurists."

The State Council of China's power to interpret—in essence overturn—the CFA's rulings has led the CFA to be nicknamed the "Court of Semi-Final Appeal" by people such as former Hong Kong Bar Association chairman Martin Lee KC SC, veteran activist-investor David Webb, human rights lawyer Mark Daly, as well as the general public. The term "Court of Semi-Final Appeal" was first officially referenced to by then-Secretary for Justice Elsie Leung as far back as 1999.

In practice, however, the power of interpretation has been used sparingly: as noted by Grenville Cross, since the Basic Law came into effect in 1997, the Central Government has issued only five interpretations up to 2022—approximately once every five years and five months—and none have involved criminal matters. Since the enactment of the NSL, there has been only one interpretation. Kemal Bokhary, a former Permanent Judge (and now Non-Permanent Judge) of the CFA known for his liberal opinions, has remarked: "The very fact that there's an interpretation [from Beijing] shows you that the court is independent. Because if the courts are not independent, then they could just be told quietly behind the scenes what to do, and they would do it. But everybody knows that's not how it works in Hong Kong."

Below is a list of Article 158 interpretations to date:

==== Basic Law interpretations ====
- 1999: Right of abode in Hong Kong
- 2004: Modifying the process of electoral reforms regarding the election of the Hong Kong Chief Executive (Basic Law Article 45 and 2005 Hong Kong Chief Executive election)
- 2005: Dealing with an incomplete term of a Chief Executive
- 2011: State immunity and the jurisdiction of Hong Kong courts
- 2016: Legislative Council oath-taking controversy

==== National security law interpretations ====
- 2022: Granting the Chief Executive power to bar foreign lawyers (barristers and solicitors qualified in a jurisdiction outside of Hong Kong, regardless of nationality) from Hong Kong national security law cases (Jimmy Lai's hiring of Tim Owen KC); first interpretation of the Hong Kong national security law and first interpretation relating to foreign lawyers.

=== Kemal Bokhary replacement ===
In 2012, Permanent Judge Kemal Bokhary—known as a leading liberal and dissenting voice on the Court—did not have his tenure extended past the mandated retirement age of 65. His replacement, however, was then-already 65-year-old Robert Tang, who was even older than Bokhary but was seen as more conservative; this appointment was described as a "surprise" by the South China Morning Post. Bokhary himself has said that he believes his tenure was not extended due to his "liberal judgments".

=== Hong Kong National Security Law ===
==== Designated national security law judges (2020) ====
Overseas non-permanent judges have so far not taken part in full hearings of national security cases brought before the CFA. This was first evidenced in HKSAR v Lai Chee Ying, where two local non-permanent judges (Stock NPJ and Chan NPJ) sat instead of the usual combination involving one overseas NPJ. Although Chief Justice Andrew Cheung has clarified that there is "no nationality requirement regarding the judges that are eligible for designation as designated judges" and that foreign judges are allowed to hear national security cases, British non-permanent judges on the CFA have come under increasing pressure to refrain from participating. The Times reported that Cheung’s remarks "will ratchet up pressure on the eight British judges to quit their positions on the court." It is unclear, however, whether overseas NPJs have not participated because they have not been designated for such cases or because they have declined to do so. This lack of clarity points to a weakness in the processes for regular selection of foreign NPJs to panels of judges to hear particular cases, as well as to the shrouded, non-transparent arrangements for the selection, appointment, and reappointment of foreign non-permanent judges.

On the question of whether overseas non-permanent judges should participate in national security cases, former Australian Chief Justice and CFA non-permanent judge Sir Anthony Mason noted in an interview with Ming Pao that judges are obligated to apply the law as long as it remains valid, even if they consider it harsh or a threat to human rights. He acknowledged that such participation may be seen by outsiders as endorsing an oppressive system, and for this reason, he believes overseas judges should not be assigned to national security cases. However, Mason emphasised that the decision to remain on the court is ultimately a personal one, and he expects that those who choose to stay will continue to uphold the rule of law and demonstrate independence and impartiality.

Among local judges, as of 2024, two non-permanent justices (Bokhary NPJ and Tang NPJ) have still not sat in on any national security law cases.

==== Resignation of non-permanent judges (since 2020) ====
Since the passage of the national security law in 2020, eight non-permanent judges from overseas jurisdictions have either resigned from the court or decided not to renew their terms, with seven doing so explicitly because of the law. Prior to 2020, no such judge had ever quit the Court in the middle of their term.

In September 2020, judge James Spigelman of Australia tendered his resignation for reasons he said were "related to the content of the national security legislation," although he did not elaborate on the specifics. He had been re-appointed to a three-year term the previous year.

This was followed in March 2022 by Lord Reed and Lord Hodge of the United Kingdom. In a statement, Lord Reed said that while "the courts in Hong Kong continue to be internationally respected for their commitment to the rule of law,... the judges of the Supreme Court cannot continue to sit in Hong Kong without appearing to endorse an administration which has departed from values of political freedom, and freedom of expression, to which the Justices of the Supreme Court are deeply committed."

In November 2022, Lady Hale — who declined to renew her tenure on the Court in 2021 — weighed in on the issue by stating, "there's going to come a stage where [British judges] are asked to apply and enforce unacceptable laws, and some of us might think that that stage has already come."

In June 2024, Lord Sumption and Lord Collins announced their resignations, with Lord Collins stating: "I have resigned from the Court of Final Appeal because of the political situation in Hong Kong, but I continue to have the fullest confidence in the court and the total independence of its members." Sumption was more explicit, arguing that Hong Kong was "slowly becoming a totalitarian state."

Lord Sumption said his remarks had not been uttered lightly, saying “I have no desire to engage in a slanging match with the Chief Executive [John Lee], and certainly not with the Chief Justice [Andrew Cheung], for whom I have the greatest respect." In response, Hong Kong's Secretary for Justice Paul stated, "the credit for the fact that Hong Kong has a high level of rule of law largely goes to our local judges; it is not the case that losing a few non-permanent judges will deal a heavy blow to our rule of law."

Just days after Lord Sumption and Lord Collins' announcement, former Chief Justice of Canada Beverley McLachlin announced she was retiring from the court, expressing her continued "confidence in the members of the court, their independence and their determination to uphold the rule of law." A year prior to her announcement, she had resisted calls to resign over concerns about the erosion of judicial independence in Hong Kong, claiming that "there's no governmental influence, and if there were I wouldn't be there."

In March 2025, more than a year before his term was due to expire, former Australian Chief Justice Robert French announced his resignation, arguing that the role of foreign judges had "become increasingly anachronistic and arguably cosmetic" amid the evolving legal and political environment following Beijing's national security crackdown. However, he maintained respect for the Hong Kong judiciary, endorsing their "integrity and independence" and rejecting claims that overseas judges were complicit in applying national security laws or lent them legitimacy. The Hong Kong government expressed regret at his resignation, thanking him for his contributions while asserting that the judicial system's integrity and the rule of law remained intact.

As of September 2026, six overseas non-permanent judges remain on the Court.

Australian judges Patrick Keane and James Allsop joined the CFA on 6 April 2023 and 24 May 2024, respectively. When questioned on his decision to join, Keane acknowledged that several judges had quit their positions over the past years, but noted that "given how successful the court has been in its role in upholding the rule of law, one should be very slow indeed to decline the opportunity to serve on such a successful court." Describing the CFA as having a long history as "a very successful institution that’s made an important contribution to the success of Hong Kong," he added that "[o]ne has to be very careful about declining to do good work because one has an apprehension that one might be asked to do bad work."

Former UK Supreme Court President Lord Neuberger, who first joined the CFA in 2009, renewed his appointment in February 2024. In public remarks made to a panel in June 2024, he stated, "My feeling is that so long as I can do good by being there and so long as I think that I might cause harm by leaving, I want to stay and support my judicial colleagues in Hong Kong and support the rule of law as long as I can." Likewise, Australian Justice William Gummow renewed his appointment in 2025.

On 10 January 2025, Lord Hoffmann, who has been a member of the CFA since 1998, extended his term for another three years, just days after delivering a CFA judgment concerning the limitation period for fiduciaries and unauthorised profits.

On 8 May 2025, the Hong Kong Government announced that Sir William Young, a former judge of the Supreme Court of New Zealand, would join the CFA as a non-permanent judge after receiving the endorsement of the Legislative Council of Hong Kong.

==== Overseas counsel for national security defendants (2023) ====
On 28 November 2022, the CFA – composed of Chief Justice Andrew Cheung, and permanent judges Robert Ribeiro and Joseph Fok – granted ad hoc admission to Tim Owen KC to defend Jimmy Lai at his trial on charges contrary to the National Security Law, and rejected the Hong Kong Justice Secretary's leave application to appeal the ruling of the lower courts on this.

Within hours of the CFA's decision, chief executive John Lee announced that the Government would seek an interpretation under Article 158 to overturn the CFA's decision (as well as overturn the decisions by the Chief Judge and the Court of Appeal). This was roundly condemned by legal experts, including Elsie Leung, Lord Pannick KC and Jonathan Kaplan KC. Even before the interpretation, the Immigration Department had withheld Owen's work visa, contrary to what the CFA had ruled.

Ultimately, Owen was replaced by Marc Corlett KC, a New Zealand barrister who was admitted to the Hong Kong bar in 2020. Corlett was widely seen as a "like-for-like" replacement for Owen, and showed that overseas specialist lawyers would need to be admitted full-time to the Hong Kong bar before being allowed to participate in national security trials.

The rationale for the exclusion of foreign lawyers and judges from such cases, uniquely, has not been explained or justified by governments in either Hong Kong or Beijing.

==== Proposed United States sanctions on Hong Kong judges (2023) ====
The United States Congressional-Executive Commission on China (CECC) released a report on 12 May 2023 suggesting sanctions be placed on 29 hand-picked Hong Kong national security judges (which includes the Chief Justice and 3 Permanent Judges), saying, "As participants in this system, judges appointed to handle national security cases contribute to these systemic violations."

This suggestion was rejected by both the Hong Kong Bar Association and the judiciary, stressing that, "there is no basis at all to call into question the integrity and independence of Hong Kong judges, whose selection, appointment and discharge of their constitutional role and duties are, and must remain, free from any political considerations and interference."

Lord Sumption criticised the proposal to sanction Hong Kong judges as "an idea that is crude, counterproductive and unjust", adding that "[m]ost of them are honourable people with all the liberal instincts of the common law". Grenville Cross also condemned the move, pointing out that the World Justice Project’s Rule of Law Index 2023 ranked Hong Kong 23rd globally, ahead of the United States, which was ranked 26th. He further noted that some foreign non-permanent judges — including those who have left the Court, such as Lord Sumption, Lord Collins, and Beverley McLachlin — have defended the independence and integrity of the local judges of the Court of Final Appeal.

=== Maria Yuen nomination saga ===
In June 2021, Justice of Appeal Maria Yuen was recommended for appointment as a permanent judge by the Judicial Officers Recommendation Commission. However the promotion was rejected by pro-Beijing legislators. The legislators, who by protocol accept the recommendations of the commission, reportedly claimed that she might be influenced by her husband, former Chief Justice Geoffrey Ma, whose defence of Hong Kong's judicial independence they considered unpatriotic.

Johannes Chan SC (Hon) said that this was:

"a very bad and worrying development for the independence of the judiciary. It provides a channel for political influence in the appointment of key judicial personnel by a [legislature] which is dominated by pro-Beijing politicians."

Whilst the blocking of top judicial appointments is commonplace in the United States — there have been 37 unsuccessful nominations to the Supreme Court of the United States to date — it is extremely rare in the Commonwealth and in Hong Kong, where judicial appointments are usually approved by the legislature without contention. It is also rare in the United Kingdom where the Lord Chancellor (formerly, was simultaneously a Cabinet minister and head of the judiciary) historically had direct influence over judicial appointments, by informally selecting candidates and then recommending them for appointment.

== Building ==
From its inception in July 1997 until September 2015, the court was located in the Former French Mission Building, in Central. In September 2015, the court relocated to the former (until 2011) Legislative Council Building, which was originally the colonial Supreme Court (1912–1985).

=== List of buildings used ===
- Former French Mission Building (1 July 1997 – 6 September 2015)
- Court of Final Appeal Building (since 7 September 2015)

=== Image gallery ===
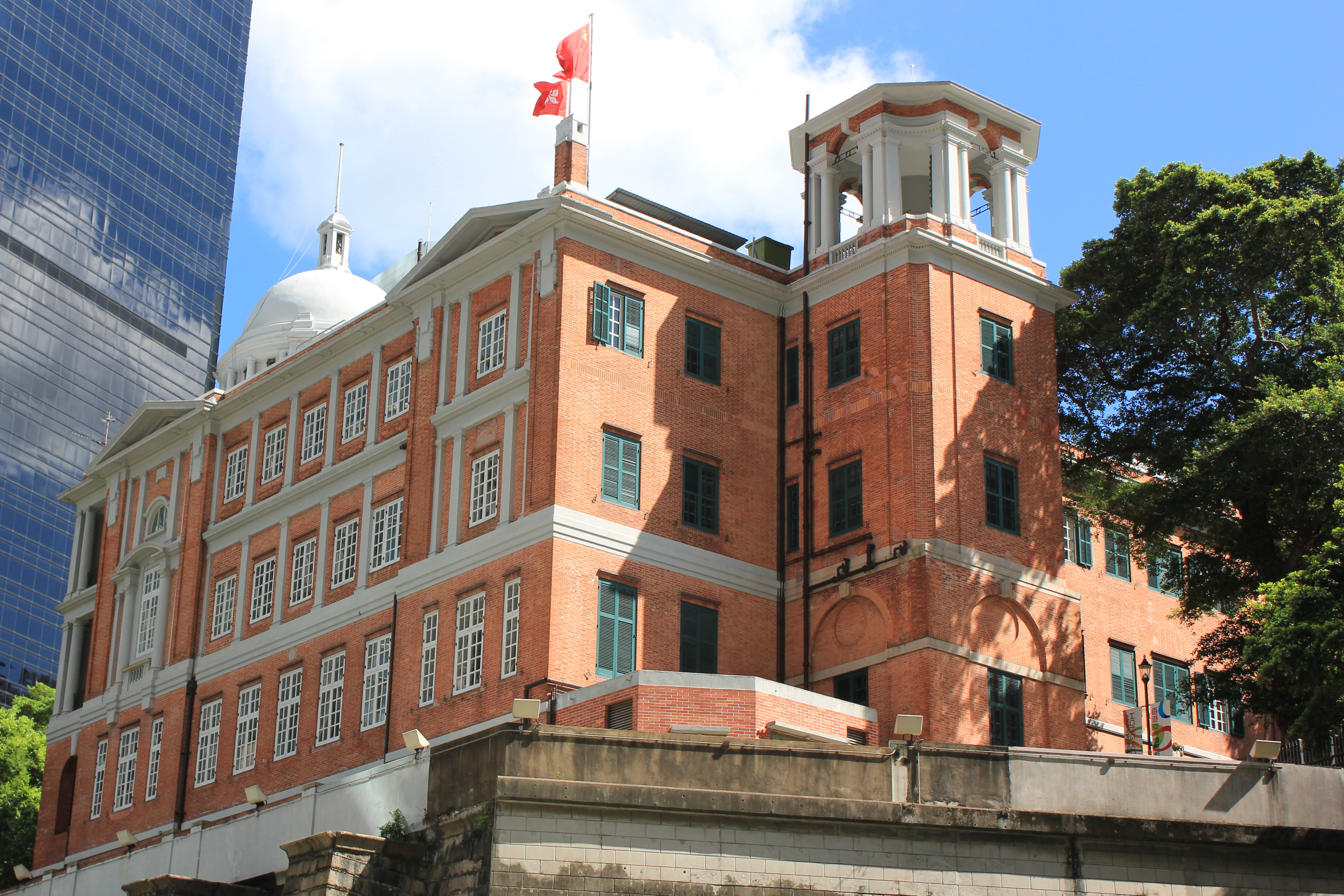
The Court of Final Appeal of Hong Kong was housed in the Former French Mission Building until September 2015

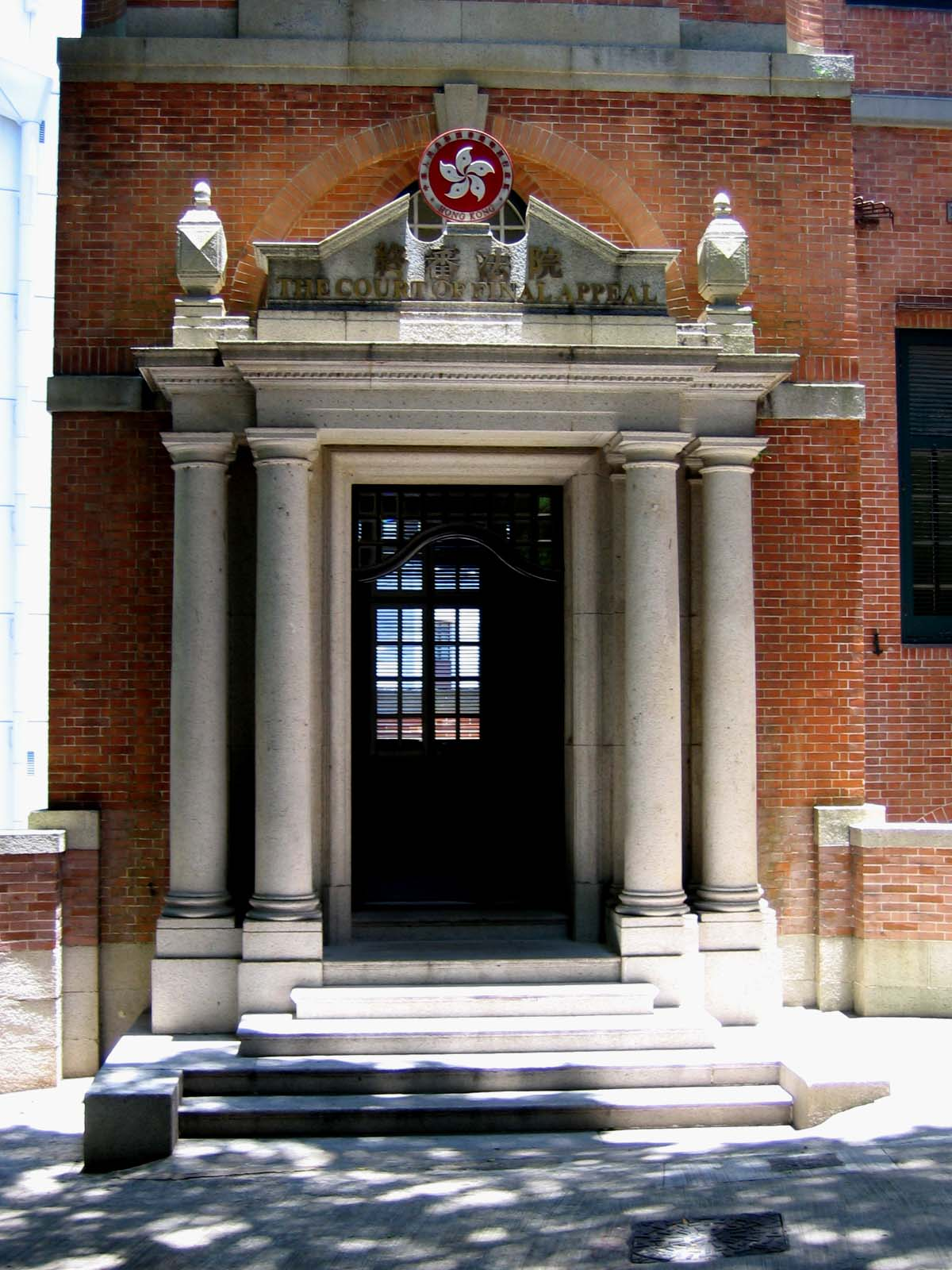
Entrance of the Former French Mission Building

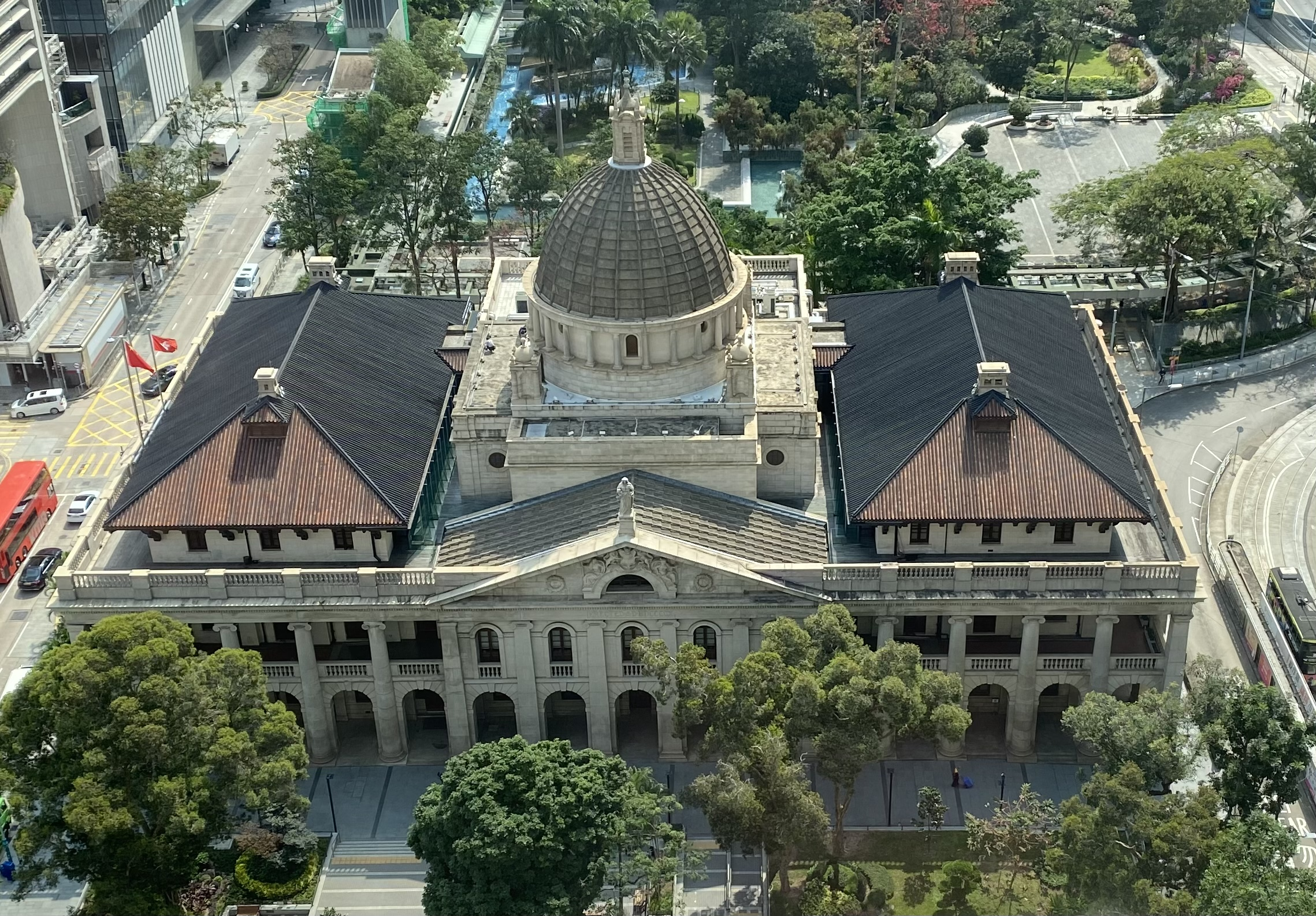
The Court of Final Appeal Building from Prince's Building

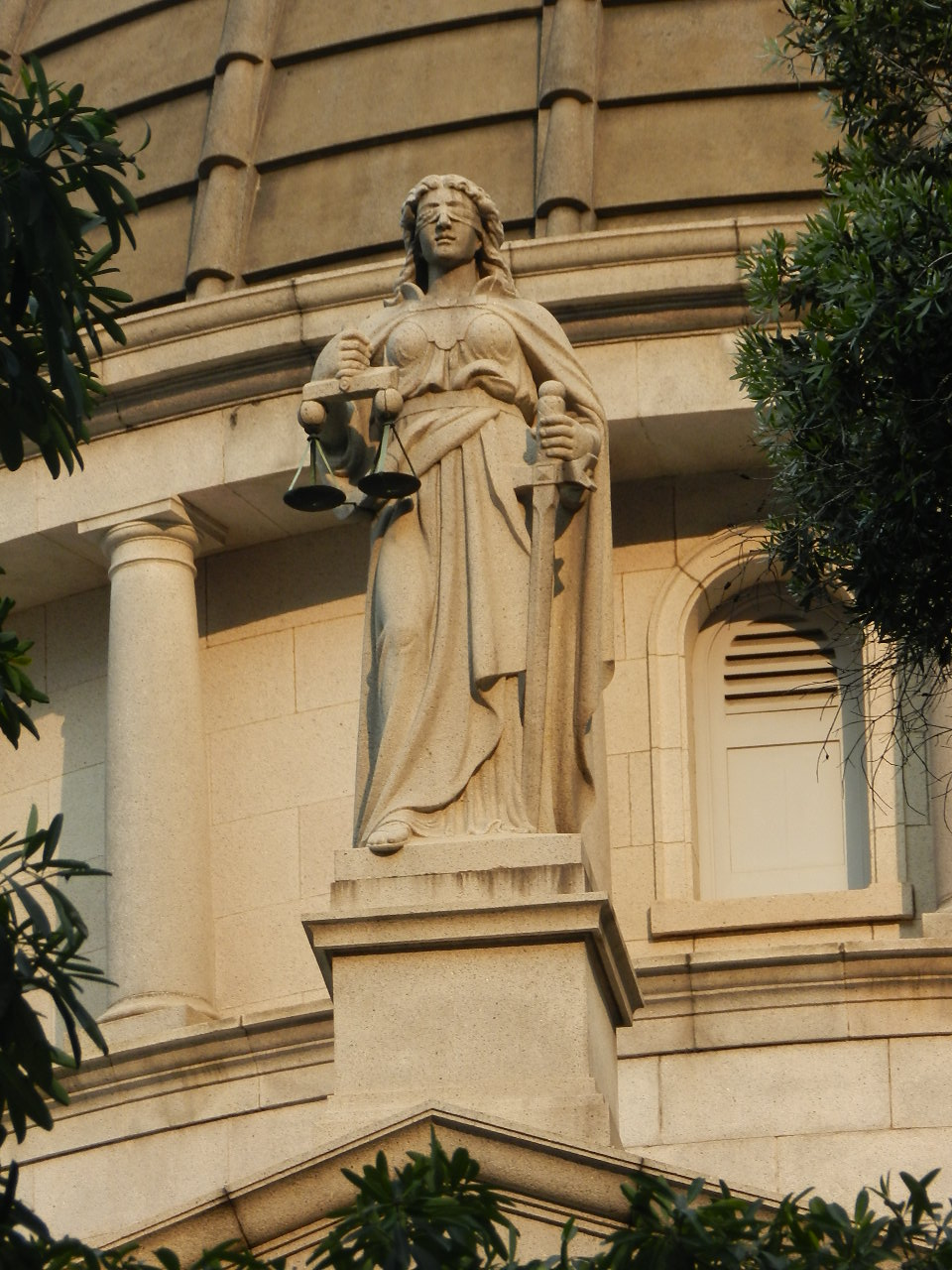
Statue of Themis, the goddess of justice, standing on the building of the Court of Final Appeal

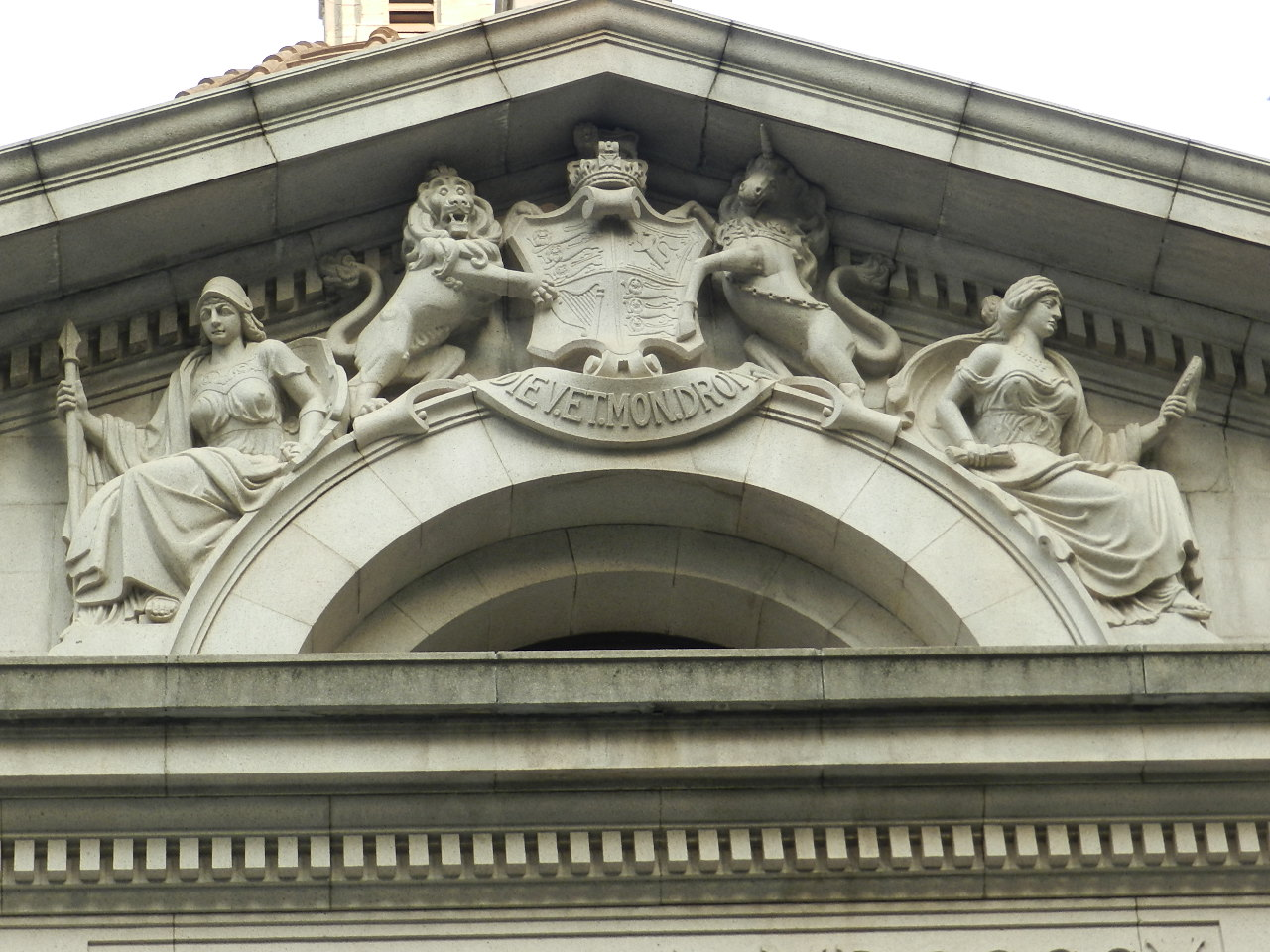
Statues of Althea, the god of truth, and Klementina, the god of mercy

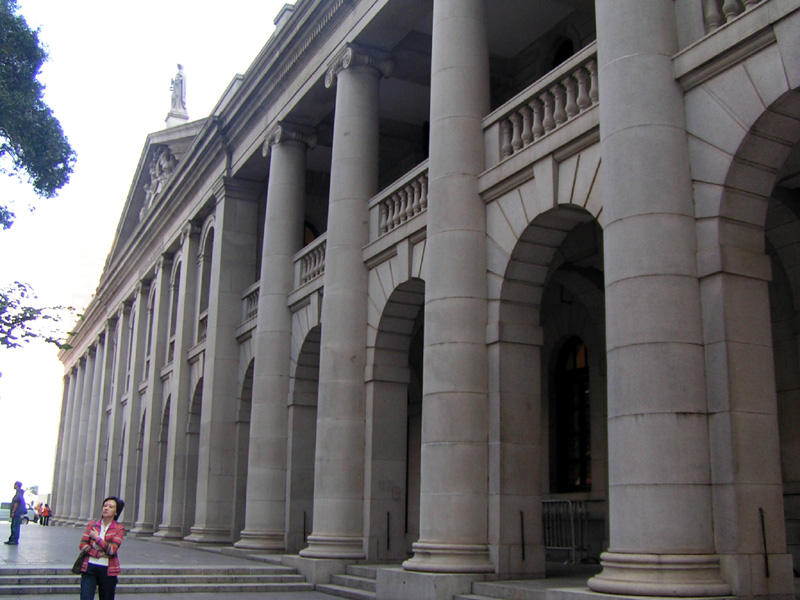
The Court of Final Appeal has been based at 8 Jackson Road since 7 September 2015; the building is the former home of the Legislative Council of Hong Kong and the Supreme Court of Hong Kong

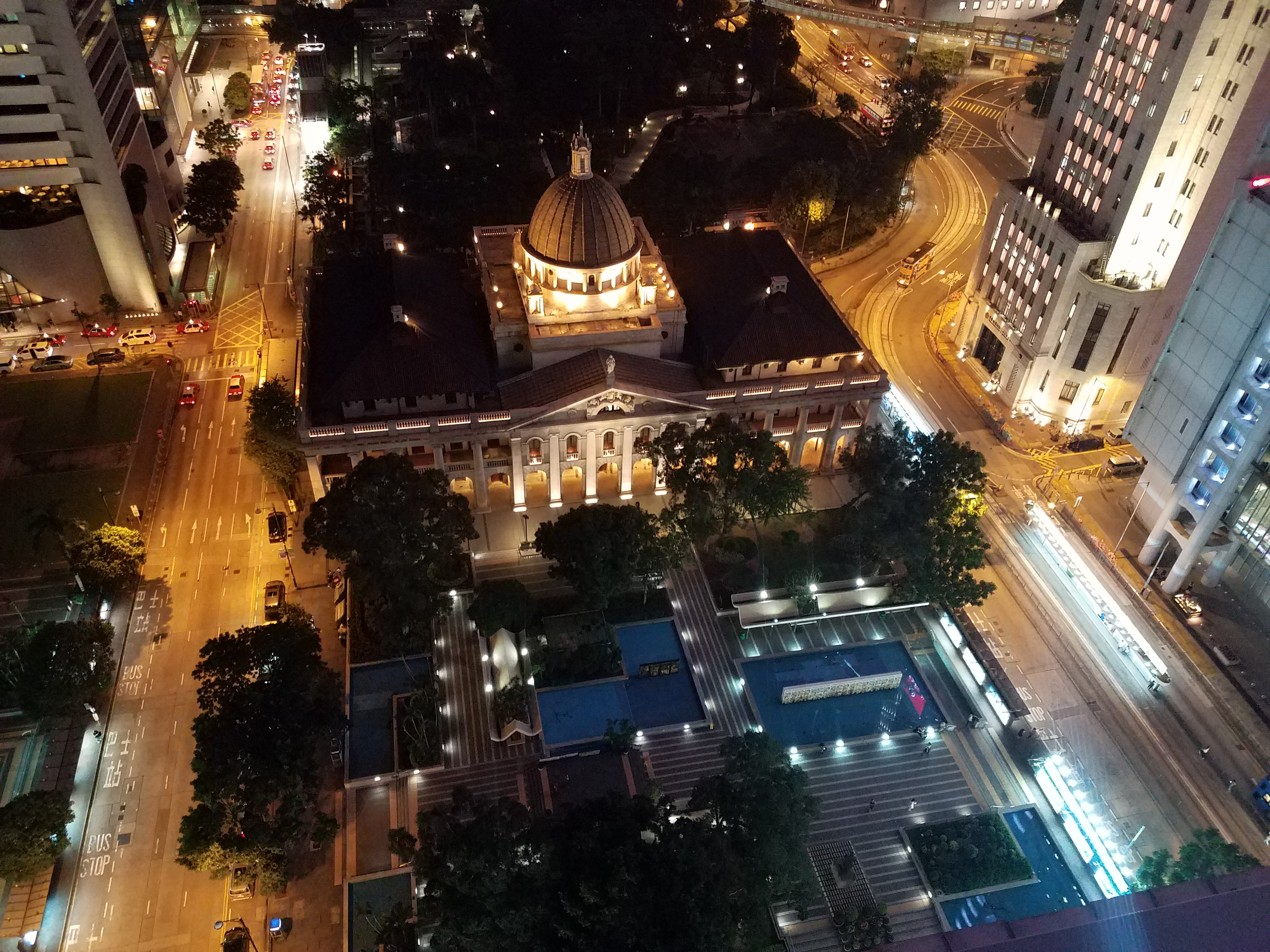
Hong Kong Court of Final Appeal building at night from Prince's Building

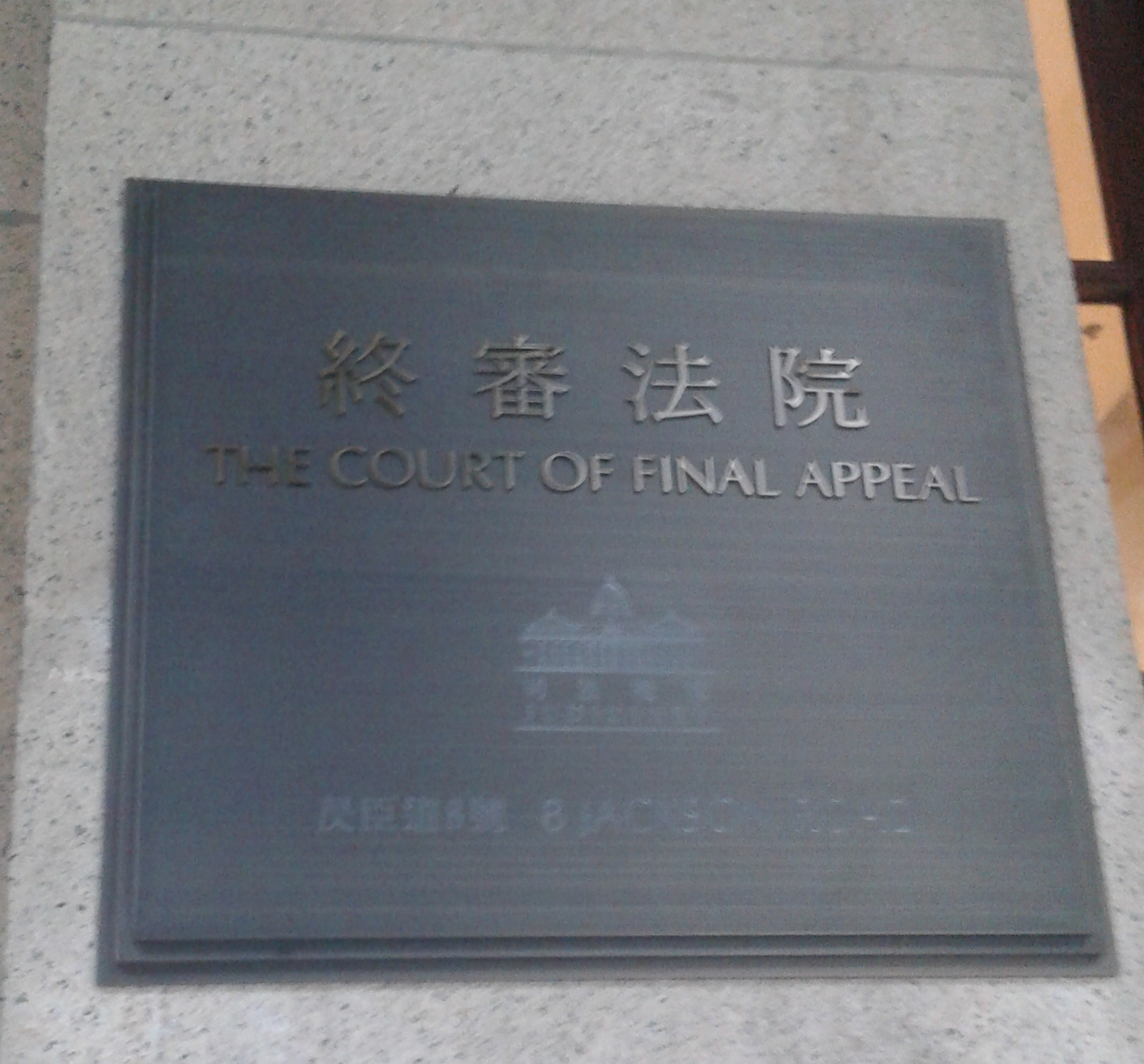
Plaque beside the entrance of the Court of Final Appeal

== See also ==
- Law of Hong Kong
- Judiciary of Hong Kong
- List of judges of the Hong Kong Court of Final Appeal
  - Chief Justice of the Court of Final Appeal
  - Permanent Judges of the Court of Final Appeal
- Hong Kong High Court
  - Chief Judge of the High Court of Hong Kong
- Supreme Court of Hong Kong
