= Frank Stock =

Hong Kong judge and lawyer

The Honourable Mr Justice Frank Stock GBS

Non-Permanent Judge of the Hong Kong Court of Final Appeal
- Incumbent
- Assumed office 2010

Designated National Security Law Judge
- Incumbent
- Assumed office 2021
- Appointed by: Carrie Lam

Vice President of the Court of Appeal of Hong Kong
- In office 2009–2014

Justice of Appeal of the Court of Appeal of Hong Kong
- In office 2000–2009

Judge of the Court of First Instance of the High Court of Hong Kong
- In office 1992–2000

Personal details
- Born: 15 June 1945 Southern Rhodesia
- Education: University of Liverpool

Frank Stock, GBS (Chinese: 司徒敬; born 15 June 1945) is a Non-Permanent Judge of the Hong Kong Court of Final Appeal. He was until 2014 a Vice President of the Hong Kong Court of Appeal.

== Early life and education ==
Born in Southern Rhodesia (now Zimbabwe), Stock received his education in the United Kingdom. In 1967, he graduated from the University of Liverpool with a law degree.

== Legal career ==
In 1968, Stock started his legal career as a barrister in England and Wales where he was in private practice for 10 years. He moved to Hong Kong in 1978 where he served in the Legal Department as a Crown Counsel. Within a year, he was promoted to Senior Crown Counsel, and by 1984, he was Principal Crown Counsel. Stock was called to the Hong Kong Bar in 1984 and took silk in 1985.

Stock served as the Solicitor General of Hong Kong from 1987 to 1991. He left the civil service to pursue a judicial career following the end of his tenure.

== Judicial career ==
In 1991, Stock sat as a Deputy High Court Judge.

In 1992, Stock was appointed as a full-time judge of the High Court of Justice of the Supreme Court (which became the Court of First Instance of the High Court on 1 July 1997). From 1993 to 1995, he was Chairman of the Insider Dealing Tribunal. He was Judge in charge of the Constitutional and Administrative Law List from 1999 to 2000.

Stock was elevated to the Court of Appeal in October 2000. He was appointed as Vice President of the Court of Appeal on 7 July 2009.

He was appointed a Non-Permanent Judge of the Court of Final Appeal in 2010. From 2010 to 2014, he primarily sat in the Court of Appeal and heard a few cases in the Court of Final Appeal.

He retired from the Court of Appeal as a full-time judge in 2014, but remains a Non-Permanent Judge of the Court of Final Appeal.

In 2014, Stock was awarded the Gold Bauhinia Star by the Chief Executive.

In May 2023, the Congressional-Executive Commission on China (CECC) of the United States Congress suggested the United States government imposing sanctions on Stock to counter the erosion of democratic freedoms in Hong Kong over his handling of Jimmy Lai's national security law case.

Legal offices
New creation	Designated National Security Law Judge; 2021–Present	Incumbent
Order of precedence
Previous: Andrew Cheung; Permanent Judge of the Court of Final Appeal	Hong Kong order of precedence Non-Permanent Judge of the Court of Final Appeal	Succeeded by Kemal Bokhary; Non-Permanent Judge of the Court of Final Appeal
