= Court of First Instance of the High Court =

Highest trial court in the Hong Kong legal system

- 香港特別行政區高等法院原訟法庭
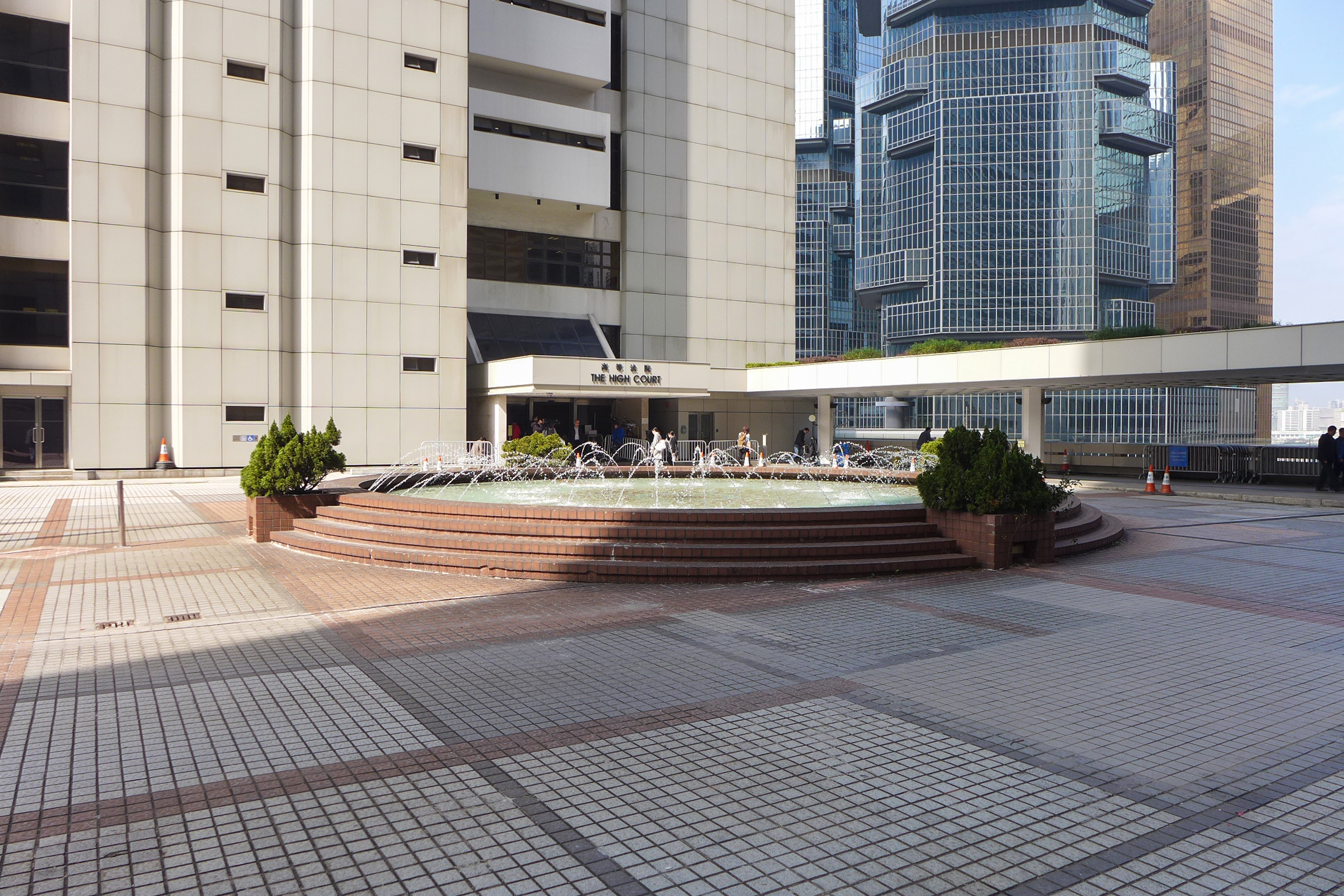
- Entrance of the High Court
- Interactive map of Court of First Instance of the High Court
- 22°16′41.38″N 114°9′47.23″E
- Established: 1976 (as High Court of Justice); 1997 (renamed Court of First Instance)
- Jurisdiction: Hong Kong
- Location: 38 Queensway, Admiralty, Hong Kong
- Coordinates: 22°16′41.38″N 114°9′47.23″E
- Authorised by: Hong Kong Basic Law
- Appeals to: Court of Appeal
- Website: judiciary.hk

Chief Judge of the High Court

Court of First Instance of the High Court
- Traditional Chinese: 香港特別行政區高等法院原訟法庭
- Simplified Chinese: 香港特别行政区高等法院原讼法庭
Transcriptions
Standard Mandarin
- Hanyu Pinyin: Xiānggǎng Tèbiéxíngzhèngqū Gāoděngfǎyuàn Yuán Sòng Fǎtíng
Yue: Cantonese
- Jyutping: hoeng1 gong2 dak6 bit6 hang4 zing3 keoi1 gou1 dang2 faat3 jyun6*2 jyun4 zung6 faat3 ting4

The Court of First Instance of the High Court (HKCFI in case citations; HC in action numbers) is the lower court of the High Court of Hong Kong (the upper court being the Court of Appeal).

The hierarchy of the Hong Kong judiciary from high to low is: the Court of Final Appeal, the High Court (consisting of the upper Court of Appeal and the lower Court of First Instance), the District Court, and magistrates' courts.

The Court of First Instance is the highest court in Hong Kong that can hear cases at first instance with unlimited jurisdiction in both civil and criminal matters. It hears predominantly civil cases with claim values exceeding HKD 3 million, and criminal cases involving the most serious crimes such as murder, manslaughter, rape, serious drugs offences and major commercial fraud. It is the only court in Hong Kong where trials are held with the involvement of a jury. It is also an appellate court hearing appeals against decisions made by Masters as well as certain lower courts and tribunals. Formerly the High Court of Justice of the Supreme Court of Hong Kong under the British rule, it was renamed the Court of First Instance by the Hong Kong Basic Law after the handover of Hong Kong.

The Court of First Instance is bound by the ratio of previous decisions (precedents) of higher courts, including the Court of Final Appeal and Court of Appeal, as well as all Hong Kong cases previously decided by the Judicial Committee of the Privy Council, that have not been overruled. The Court of First Instance is not bound its own previous decisions.

As a part of the High Court, the Court of First Instance is based in the High Court building in Admiralty. However, it has occasionally sat elsewhere to hear cases, most notably in the 47 democrats' case, in which the court sat in the West Kowloon Law Courts Building in Sham Shui Po in order to accommodate the large number of defendants.

== History ==
=== Establishment ===
The High Court of Justice was created by the Supreme Court Ordinance 1975, which took effect on 20 February 1976 and set up both the High Court of Justice and the Court of Appeal as constituent parts of the then Supreme Court of Hong Kong, which had existed since 1844 as a unitary entity.

The new High Court of Justice exercised the civil and criminal jurisdiction of the Supreme Court at first instance, which included, for civil matters, "original jurisdiction and authority of a like nature and extent as that held and exercised by the Chancery, Family and Queen's Bench Divisions of the High Court of Justice in England", and for criminal matters, "original jurisdiction of a like nature and extent as that held and exercised in criminal matters by the High Court of Justice and the Crown Court in England respectively".

=== After 1997 ===
The High Court of Justice of the Supreme Court was renamed the Court of First Instance of the High Court upon the transfer of sovereignty of Hong Kong from the United Kingdom to China on 1 July 1997, as reflected in the Basic Law and the now-renamed High Court Ordinance.

== Jurisdiction ==
=== Appellate ===
The appellate jurisdiction of the Court of First Instance is limited to decisions made by Masters and appeals from certain lower courts and tribunals:

- Magistrates' Courts
- Small Claims Tribunal
- Obscene Articles Tribunal
- Labour Tribunal
- Minor Employment Claims Adjudication Board

=== Supervisory ===
The Court of First Instance exercises its supervisory jurisdiction over inferior courts and administrative bodies through judicial review. All applications for judicial review originate from the Court of First Instance, where an applicant must seek leave to apply for judicial review from a judge of the Court of First Instance, typically the judge in charge of the Constitutional and Administrative Law List.

== Proceedings ==
Proceedings in the Court of First Instance are generally held before a single judge, though the court may sit as a panel of two or three judges.

=== Language ===
Trials and proceedings in the Court of First Instance may be conducted in English or Chinese (but not both at the same time), reflecting the co-equal status of Hong Kong's two official languages. Parties may request that proceedings take place in Chinese, and a bilingual judge may be arranged to hear the case. While most judges are proficient in both languages, most proceedings are in practice conducted in English, with witnesses often giving evidence in Cantonese, which is then translated into English by a court interpreter.

=== Jury trials ===
The Court of First Instance is the only court in Hong Kong where cases are tried by a judge with a jury (although inquests in the Coroner's Court may involve a jury). The Basic Law only maintains 'the trial by jury previously practised in Hong Kong' but it does not make jury trial an absolute right. In the case of Chiang Lily v Secretary for Justice, the court confirmed that "there does not exist, in Hong Kong, any absolute right to trial by jury nor any mechanism by which a person to be tried of an indictable offence may elect to be so tried" (per Wright J.). A defendant will only face a jury trial if he is tried in the Court of First Instance, and the decision is the prerogative of the Secretary for Justice.

== Judges ==
Judges of the Court of First Instance are commonly known as High Court judges and are formally styled "the Honourable Mr/Madam Justice (Forename) Surname", shortened to "Surname J" in writing. As many judges now have the same surname, judicial titles now often include a judge's forename or his or her initials. In court, High Court judges are addressed as "My Lord" or "My Lady", regardless of whether they are full-time judges, part-time Recorders or Deputy High Court Judges.

In addition to full-time judges, part-time judges, who are typically drawn from the ranks of senior barristers and retired judges, are appointed to sit on the Court of First Instance. Recorders are appointed to sit for a few weeks every year for a term of 3 years, while Deputy High Court Judges are appointed to sit in a more ad hoc manner. The Court of First Instance is the highest court in Hong Kong that provides for the appointment of part-time judges, save for the non-permanent judges of the Court of Final Appeal. Masters (Chinese: 聆案官), who are full-time judicial officers, exercise part of the case-management powers of a High Court judge and assist in the taxation of costs.

High Court judges rank below the Justices of Appeal and above District Court judges. The court and ceremonial dress of High Court judges has remained unchanged since the British era, and are similar to how High Court judges in England and Wales dressed before the reforms of 2008. In civil cases, High Court judges typically wear a black gown over a white shirt with a wing collar or collarette, bands, a court waistcoat, and a short horsehair wig, similar to how barristers dress in court, and wear business attire when sitting in chambers; when hearing criminal cases, they will wear a red-and-black gown with a wing collar or collarette with bands. On ceremonial occasions, High Court judges wear a red robe with a grey hood, a jabot instead of bands, a full-bottomed wig, with breeches and buckled shoes.

Appointments to the Court of First Instance are made by the Chief Executive acting on the recommendation of the Judicial Officers Recommendation Commission, and appointees must have practiced law as a lawyer or judge for at least 10 years. Although both barristers and solicitors are both eligible for appointment, the vast majority of judges are drawn from the barristers' branch of the profession, with very few former solicitors on the bench.

== See also ==
- Judiciary of Hong Kong
  - High Court (Hong Kong)
    - Court of Appeal (Hong Kong)
