= List of judges of the Hong Kong Court of Final Appeal =

The Court of Final Appeal is Hong Kong's highest court. As set out in the Court of Final Appeal Ordinance, the court is composed of the Chief Justice, no less than three permanent judges, and no more than 30 non-permanent judges. The Court sits as a bench of five in substantive hearings, which it must be heard by at least one non-permanent judge alongside the Chief Justice and the three permanent judges.

The judges of the Court of Final Appeal are appointed by the Chief Executive on the recommendation of the Judicial Officers Recommendation Commission, with the appointment of the Chief Justice additional requiring the endorsement of the Legislative Council. Permanent judges enjoy life tenure, subject to a retirement age of 70; in exceptional circumstances, the retirement age can be extended to 76. However, in September 2025, the tenure of justice Roberto Ribeiro was extended once again for an unprecedented three-year term starting on his 77th birthday, meaning that he will serve as a permanent judge until his 80th birthday.

As of April 2023, the monthly salary of the Chief Justice and permanent judges are HK$411,500 and HK$399,950 respectively.

== List of permanent judges ==
denotes incumbent permanent judges

=== Chief Justices ===
No.	Portrait	Name	Chinese name	Tenure start	Tenure end	Tenure length	Previous judicial office	Inner bar	Appointed by
1		Andrew Li Kwok-nang (Born 1948)	李國能	1 July 1997	31 August 2010	13 years and 62 days	Deputy High Court Judge (concurrently as Barrister in private practice)	QC (1988)	Tung Chee-hwa
2		Geoffrey Ma Tao-li (Born 1956)	馬道立	1 September 2010	10 January 2021	10 years and 132 days	Chief Judge of the High Court	QC (1993)	Donald Tsang
3		Andrew Cheung Kui-nung (Born 1961)	張舉能	11 January 2021	Incumbent	5 years and 288 days	Permanent Judge of the Court of Final Appeal		Carrie Lam

=== Permanent Judges ===
No.	Name	Chinese name	Replacing	Tenure start	Tenure end	Tenure length	Previous judicial office	Inner bar	Appointed by
1	Henry Denis Litton (Born 1934)	烈顯倫	Inaugural	1 July 1997	13 September 2000 (Note: Justice Litton began pre-resignation leave on 1 August 2000.)	3 years and 75 days	Vice-president of the Court of Appeal	QC (1970)	Tung Chee-hwa
2	Charles Arthur Ching (1935–2000)	沈澄	Inaugural	1 July 1997	6 October 2000	3 years and 98 days	Justice of Appeal	QC (1974)	Tung Chee-hwa
3	Syed Kemal Shah Bokhary (Born 1947)	包致金	Inaugural	1 July 1997	24 October 2012	15 years and 116 days	Justice of Appeal	QC (1983)	Tung Chee-hwa
4	Patrick Chan Siu-oi (Born 1948)	陳兆愷	Litton	1 September 2000 (Note: Took office before the retirement of his predecessor; hence the number of active PJ's was briefly more than the usual 3.)	20 October 2013	13 years and 50 days	Chief Judge of the High Court		Tung Chee-hwa
5	Roberto Alexandre Vieira Ribeiro (Born 1949)	李義	Ching	1 September 2000	Incumbent	26 years and 55 days	Justice of Appeal	QC (1990)	Tung Chee-hwa
6	Robert Tang Kwok-ching (Born 1947)	鄧國楨	Bokhary	25 October 2012	24 October 2018	6 years and 0 days	Vice-president of the Court of Appeal (Concurrent Non-Permanent Judge of the Court of Final Appeal)	QC (1986)	Leung Chun-ying
7	Joseph Paul Fok (Born 1962)	霍兆剛	Chan	21 October 2013	Incumbent	13 years and 5 days	Justice of Appeal	SC (1999)	Leung Chun-ying
8	Andrew Cheung Kui-nung (Born 1961)	張舉能	Tang	25 October 2018	10 January 2021 (Note: Became the 3rd Chief Justice.)	2 years and 78 days	Chief Judge of the High Court		Carrie Lam
9	Johnson Lam Man-hon (Born 1961)	林文瀚	Cheung	30 July 2021	Incumbent	5 years and 88 days	Vice-president of the Court of Appeal		Carrie Lam

== List of Hong Kong non-permanent judges ==
=== Current ===
No.	Name	Chinese name	Tenure start	Tenure length	Previous senior judicial offices	Inner bar	Appointed by
1	Frank Stock (Born 1945)	司徒敬	1 September 2010	16 years and 55 days	Vice-president of the Court of Appeal (2009–14)	QC (1985)	Donald Tsang
2	Syed Kemal Shah Bokhary (Born 1947)	包致金	25 October 2012	14 years and 1 day	Permanent Judge of the Court of Final Appeal (1997–2012)	QC (1983)	Leung Chun-ying
3	Patrick Chan Siu-oi (Born 1948)	陳兆愷	21 October 2013	13 years and 5 days	Chief Judge of the High Court (1997–2000); Permanent Judge of the Court of Final Appeal (2000–13)		Leung Chun-ying
4	Robert Tang Kwok-ching (Born 1947)	鄧國楨	25 October 2018	8 years and 1 day	Vice-president of the Court of Appeal (2006–12); Non-Permanent Judge of the Court of Final Appeal (2010–12); Permanent Judge of the Court of Final Appeal (2012–18)	QC (1986)	Carrie Lam

=== Former ===
No.	Name	Chinese name	Tenure start	Tenure end	Tenure length	Prior most senior local judicial role	Inner bar	Notes	Appointed by
1	Sir Denys Tudor Emil Roberts	羅弼時爵士	28 July 1997	27 July 2003	6 years and 0 days	Chief Justice of the Supreme Court (1979–88)	QC (1964)	Inaugural justice	Tung Chee-hwa
2	Sir Alan Armstrong Huggins	赫健士爵士	28 July 1997	27 July 2003	6 years and 0 days	Vice-president of the Court of Appeal (1980–87)		Inaugural justice	Tung Chee-hwa
3	Sir Derek Cons	康士爵士	28 July 1997	27 July 2006	9 years and 0 days	Vice-president of the Court of Appeal (1986–93)		Inaugural justice	Tung Chee-hwa
4	William James Silke	邵祺	28 July 1997	27 July 2009	12 years and 0 days	Vice-president of the Court of Appeal (1987–94)		Inaugural justice	Tung Chee-hwa
5	Kutlu Tekin Fuad	傅雅德	28 July 1997	27 July 2009	12 years and 0 days	Vice-president of the Court of Appeal (1988–93)		Inaugural justice	Tung Chee-hwa
6	Gerald Paul Nazareth	黎守律	28 July 1997	27 July 2012	15 years and 0 days	Vice-president of the Court of Appeal (1994–2000)	QC (1981)	Inaugural justice	Tung Chee-hwa
7	John Barry Mortimer	馬天敏	28 July 1997	27 July 2015	18 years and 0 days	Vice-president of the Court of Appeal (1997–99)	QC (1971)	Inaugural justice	Tung Chee-hwa
8	Sir Noel Plunkett Power	鮑偉華爵士	28 July 1997	19 November 2009	12 years and 115 days	Vice-president of the Court of Appeal (1997–99)		Inaugural justice; died in office	Tung Chee-hwa
9	Art Michael McMullin	麥慕年	28 July 1997	27 July 2003	6 years and 0 days	Justice of Appeal of the Court of Appeal (1979–86)		Inaugural justice	Tung Chee-hwa
10	Philip Gerard Clough	郭樂富	28 July 1997	27 July 2006	9 years and 0 days	Justice of Appeal of the Court of Appeal (1986–92)		Inaugural justice	Tung Chee-hwa
11	Neil Macdougall	麥德高	28 July 1997	27 July 2003	6 years and 0 days	Justice of Appeal of the Court of Appeal (1993–95)		Inaugural justice	Tung Chee-hwa
12	Henry Denis Litton	烈顯倫	14 September 2000	13 September 2015	15 years and 0 days	Permanent Judge of the Court of Final Appeal (1997–2000)	QC (1970)		Tung Chee-hwa
13	Charles Arthur Ching	沈澄	7 October 2000	30 November 2000	55 days	Permanent Judge of the Court of Final Appeal (1997–2000)	QC (1974)	Died in office	Tung Chee-hwa
14	Robert Tang Kwok-ching	鄧國楨	1 September 2010	24 October 2012	2 years and 54 days	Vice-president of the Court of Appeal (2006–12)	QC (1986)	First NPJ appointed permanent judge	Donald Tsang
15	Michael John Hartmann	夏正民	1 September 2010	31 August 2016	6 years and 0 days	Justice of Appeal of the Court of Appeal (2008–12)			Donald Tsang

== List of overseas non-permanent judges ==
An overseas non-permanent judge must be a judge or a retired judge of a court in another common law jurisdiction.

=== Current ===
No.	Jurisdiction	Portrait	Name	Chinese name	Tenure start	Tenure length	Prior most senior judicial role	Inner bar	Appointed by
1	United Kingdom		Lord Hoffmann	賀輔明勳爵	12 January 1998	28 years and 287 days	Lord of Appeal in Ordinary (1995–2009)	QC (1977)	Tung Chee-hwa
2	United Kingdom		Lord Neuberger of Abbotsbury	廖柏嘉勳爵	1 March 2009	17 years and 239 days	President of the Supreme Court of the United Kingdom (2012–17)	QC (1987)	Donald Tsang
3	Australia		Patrick Anthony Keane	祈顯義	6 April 2023	3 years and 203 days	Justice of the High Court of Australia (2013–22)	QC (1988)	John Lee
4	Australia		James Leslie Bain Allsop	歐頌律	24 May 2024	2 years and 155 days	Chief Justice of the Federal Court of Australia (2013–23)	SC (1994)	John Lee
5	New Zealand		Sir William Gillow Gibbes Austen Young	楊偉廉爵士	23 June 2025	1 year and 125 days	Justice of the Supreme Court of New Zealand (2010–22)	QC (1991)	John Lee
6	New Zealand		Sir Terence Arnold	區諾德爵士	Pending	Pending	Justice of the Supreme Court of New Zealand (2013–17)	QC (1994)	John Lee

=== Former ===
No.	Jurisdiction	Portrait	Name	Chinese name	Tenure start	Tenure end	Tenure length	Prior most senior judicial role	Inner bar	Notes	Appointed by
1	New Zealand; United Kingdom		Lord Cooke of Thorndon	顧安國勳爵	28 July 1997	27 July 2006	9 years and 0 days	Lord of Appeal in Ordinary (1996–2001)	QC (1964)	Inaugural justice	Tung Chee-hwa
2	Australia		Sir Anthony Frank Mason	梅師賢爵士	28 July 1997	27 July 2015	18 years and 0 days	Chief Justice of Australia (1987–95)	QC (1964)	Inaugural justice	Tung Chee-hwa
3	New Zealand		Sir Edward Jonathan Somers	沈穆善爵士	28 July 1997	3 June 2002	4 years and 311 days	Judge of the Court of Appeal of New Zealand (1981–90)	QC (1973)	Inaugural justice; died in office	Tung Chee-hwa
4	Australia		Sir Daryl Michael Dawson	杜偉舜爵士	1 September 1997	31 August 2003	6 years and 0 days	Justice of the High Court of Australia (1982–97)	QC (1971)		Tung Chee-hwa
5	United Kingdom		Lord Nicholls of Birkenhead	李啟新勳爵	12 January 1998	11 January 2004	6 years and 0 days	Second Senior Lord of Appeal in Ordinary (2002–07)	QC (1974)		Tung Chee-hwa
6	Australia		Sir Francis Gerard Brennan	布仁立爵士	28 July 2000	27 July 2012	12 years and 0 days	Chief Justice of Australia (1995–98)	QC (1965)		Tung Chee-hwa
7	United Kingdom		Lord Millett	苗禮治勳爵	28 July 2000	27 May 2021	20 years and 304 days	Lord of Appeal in Ordinary (1998–2004)	QC (1974)	Died in office	Tung Chee-hwa
8	New Zealand		Sir Johann Thomas Eichelbaum	艾俊彬爵士	28 July 2000	27 July 2012	12 years and 0 days	Chief Justice of New Zealand (1989–99)	QC (1978)		Tung Chee-hwa
9	United Kingdom		Lord Scott of Foscote	施廣智勳爵	28 July 2003	27 July 2012	9 years and 0 days	Lord of Appeal in Ordinary (2000–09)	QC (1975)		Tung Chee-hwa
10	United Kingdom		Lord Woolf	伍爾夫勳爵	28 July 2003	27 July 2012	9 years and 0 days	Lord Chief Justice of England and Wales (2000–05)			Tung Chee-hwa
11	New Zealand		Sir Ivor Lloyd Morgan Richardson	韋卓善爵士	28 July 2003	27 July 2009	6 years and 0 days	President of the Court of Appeal of New Zealand (1996–2002)			Tung Chee-hwa
12	Australia		Michael Hudson McHugh	馬曉義	1 July 2006	30 June 2012	6 years and 0 days	Justice of the High Court of Australia (1989–2005)	QC (1973)		Donald Tsang
13	New Zealand		Sir Thomas Munro Gault	高禮哲爵士	1 July 2006	19 May 2015	8 years and 323 days	Justice of the Supreme Court of New Zealand (2004–06)	QC (1984)	Died in office	Donald Tsang
14	United Kingdom		Lord Walker of Gestingthorpe	華學佳勳爵	1 March 2009	16 November 2023	14 years and 261 days	Justice of the Supreme Court of the United Kingdom (2009–13)	QC (1982)	Died in office	Donald Tsang
15	Australia		Anthony Murray Gleeson	紀立信	1 March 2009	29 February 2024	15 years and 0 days	Chief Justice of Australia (1998–2008)	QC (1974)		Donald Tsang
16	United Kingdom		Lord Clarke of Stone-cum-Ebony	簡嘉麒勳爵	30 June 2011	29 June 2020	9 years and 0 days	Justice of the Supreme Court of the United Kingdom (2009–17)	QC (1979)		Donald Tsang
17	United Kingdom		Lord Collins of Mapesbury	郝廉思勳爵	30 June 2011	5 June 2024	12 years and 342 days	Justice of the Supreme Court of the United Kingdom (2009–11)	QC (1997)	Resigned mid-term	Donald Tsang
18	United Kingdom		Lord Phillips of Worth Matravers	范理申勳爵	1 October 2012	30 September 2024	12 years and 0 days	President of the Supreme Court of the United Kingdom (2009–12)	QC (1978)		Leung Chun-ying
19	Australia		James Jacob Spigelman	施覺民	29 July 2013	2 September 2020	7 years and 36 days	Chief Justice of New South Wales (1998–2011)	QC (1986)	First NPJ to resign mid-term	Leung Chun-ying
20	Australia		William Montague Charles Gummow	甘慕賢	29 July 2013	17 September 2026	13 years and 51 days	Justice of the High Court of Australia (1995–2012)	QC (1986)	Died in office	Leung Chun-ying
21	United Kingdom		Lord Reed of Allermuir	韋彥德勳爵	31 May 2017	30 March 2022	4 years and 304 days	President of the Supreme Court of the United Kingdom (2020–)	QC (1995)	Resigned mid-term	Leung Chun-ying
22	Australia		Robert Shenton French	范禮全	31 May 2017	31 March 2025	7 years and 305 days	Chief Justice of Australia (2008–17)		Resigned mid-term	Leung Chun-ying
23	United Kingdom		Baroness Hale of Richmond	何熙怡女男爵	30 July 2018	29 July 2021	3 years and 0 days	President of the Supreme Court of the United Kingdom (2017–20)	QC (1989)	First NPJ to not renew term	Carrie Lam
24	Canada		Beverley Marian McLachlin	麥嘉琳	30 July 2018	29 July 2024	6 years and 0 days	Chief Justice of Canada (2000–17)			Carrie Lam
25	United Kingdom		Lord Sumption	岑耀信勳爵	18 December 2019	4 June 2024	4 years and 170 days	Justice of the Supreme Court of the United Kingdom (2012–18)	QC (1986)	Resigned mid-term	Carrie Lam
26	United Kingdom		Lord Hodge	賀知義勳爵	1 January 2021	30 March 2022	1 year and 89 days	Deputy President of the Supreme Court of the United Kingdom (2020–2025)	QC (1996)	Resigned mid-term	Carrie Lam

=== Statistics ===
Traditionally, all overseas non-permanent judges came from three common law jurisdictions: the United Kingdom, Australia, and New Zealand. In 2018, Beverly McLachlin—the former Chief Justice of Canada—became the first Canadian (and, along with Baroness Hale, one of the first two women) to be appointed to the CFA.

Jurisdiction	Current	Former	Total
United Kingdom	2	12	14
Australia	2	8	10
New Zealand	1	5	6
Canada	0	1	1
Total	5	26	31

== See also ==
- Hong Kong Court of Final Appeal
