= List of alumni of the University of Hong Kong =

This is a brief list of notable graduates of the University of Hong Kong (HKU). For a detailed version, please refer to the Chinese version of this article.

== Faculty of Arts ==
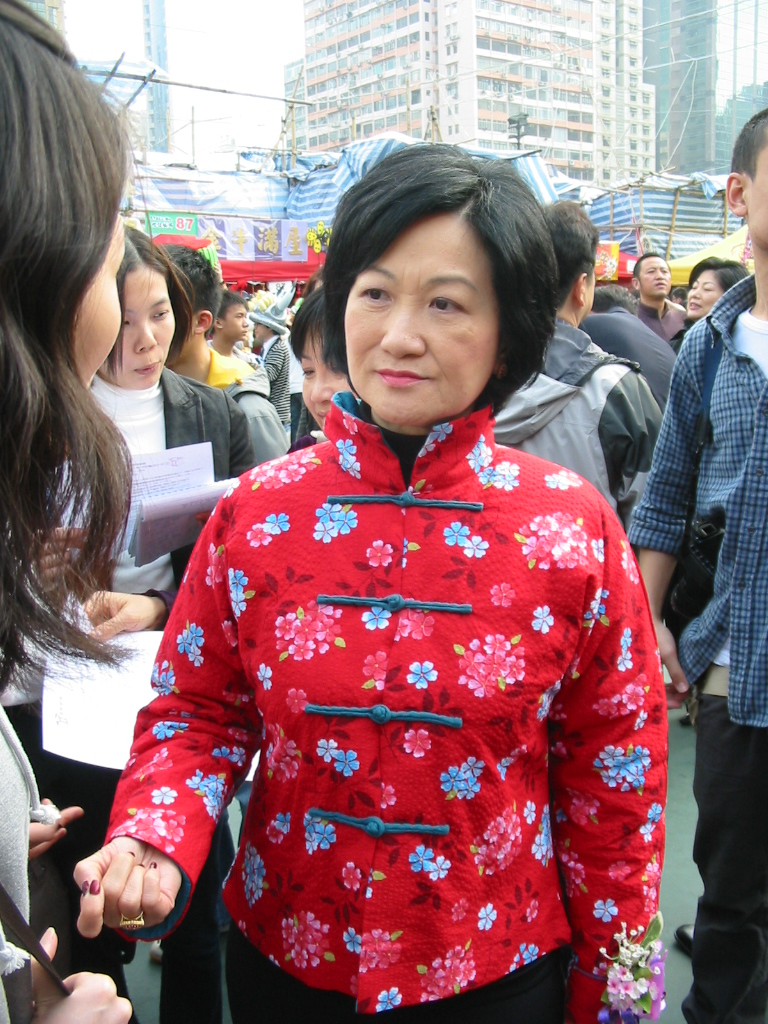
Regina Ip

Name	Known for	Degree(s) & year
Sir Yuet-keung Kan	Former Senior Unofficial Member, Executive Council (1974-1980) and Legislative Council (1968-1972)	BA 1934
Eric Peter Ho	Former Secretary for Trade and Industry (1983-1987)	BA (Economics) 1950
Timothy Ha Wing-ho	LegCo member (1991-1995), former Principal, St. Paul's College	BA (History) 1960
Hui Yin-fat	Former Director, Hong Kong Council of Social Service (1973-2001)	BA 1960
Regina Ip Lau Suk-yee	Former Secretary for Security of Hong Kong (1998–2003) and Hong Kong Legislator (since 2008)	B.A. (Eng Lit.)
Elizabeth Wong	Former Director of Social Welfare and Hong Kong Legislator; now writer	B.A. (Eng Lit.) 1962
John Chan Cho-chak	Former senior civil servant (Administrative Officer): Secretary for Education and Manpower, Deputy Chief Secretary	B.A. (Eng Lit.) 1964
Anson Chan Fang On-sang	Former Chief Secretary for Administration of Hong Kong	B.A. (Eng Lit.)
Eileen Chang	Writer	Did not complete (English literature)
Matthew Cheung Kin-chung	Former Chief Secretary for Administration (2017-2021)	BA 1972
Mabel Cheung	Film director	BA 1973
Ching Cheong	Journalist	B.Econ 1975
Selina Chow Selina Chow Leung Suk-yee	Non ex-officio Member of the Executive Council	BA (English)
Chan Hing-yan	Composer and music educator	chair of the Department of Music
Ann Hui	Director	BA 1969, MA 1973
Ip Kin-yuen	Former LegCo member (Education Functional Constituency): 2012-2020; Former Deputy President, Hong Kong Professional Teachers' Union	BA (Chin. Lit., Chin. Hist.) 1984
Rafael Hui Si Yan	Former Chief Secretary for Administration of Hong Kong	BA 1970, DSocSc honoris causa, 2007
Clara Law	Film director	
Martin Lee Chu-ming	Former Legislative Councillor (Hong Kong Island)	BA
Margaret Ng	Member of the Legislative Council (Legal constituency)	BA 1969, MA 1975
Catherine Joyce Symons	Headmistress of DGS, Legco & Execo member	BA 1939, LL.D honoris causa 1978
Stephen Chan Chi-wan	Former Administrative Officer of the Hong Kong Government; former CEO of Commercial Radio Hong Kong; former General Manager of TVB; YouTuber Now: Chief Advisor of Commercial Radio Hong Kong	BA (1st Hon) (Linguistics, Comparative Literature) 1981
Tsang Yok-sing	President of the Legislative Council	BA (Mathematics) 1968, CertEd 1981, AdvDipEd 1982, MEd 1983
Kay Tse On-kei	Singer	BA (American Studies) 2004
James Wong Jim	Lyricist	BA 1963, MPhil 1983, PhD 2003
Lin Xi	Lyricist	BA (Translation) 1984
Patrick Yu	Lawyer	BA
Wong Chi Hang Sara	Artist	MA (Landscape Architecture)
Haider Hatim Tyebjee Barma	Former senior civil servant, Hong Kong Government (Secretary for Transport: 1993-1996; Chairman, Public Services Commission: 1996-2005)	BA (Economics, Political Science) 1965
Philip Chen Nan-lok	Businessman (Former CEO of the Cathay Pacific, Executive Director of Swire Pacific)	BA (History, Political Science) 1977

== Faculty of Business and Economics ==
Name	Known for	Degree(s) & year
Edan Lui	Singer and actor; member of Hong Kong Cantopop group MIRROR	BBA (IS) 2019
Archie Sin	Singer; TVB Singer	BBA(Acc&Fin) 2020

== Faculty of Engineering ==
Name	Known for	Degree(s) & year
Raymond Ho Chung-tai	Former LegCo member, former deputy of the National People's Congress, PRC	BSc (Eng) 1963
Lee Cheuk-yan	Member of the Legislative Council	BSc (Eng) 1978
Fu Bingchang	Nationalist and Chinese politician	
Chung Sze-yuen	Knight Grand Cross of the Most Excellent Order of the British Empire (GBE)	
Zion Tse	Tenured Associate Professor of Medical Robotics at the University of Georgia	BSc (Eng) 2006

== Faculty of Law ==
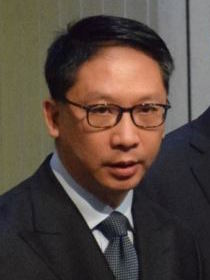
Rimsky Yuen, former Secretary for Justice

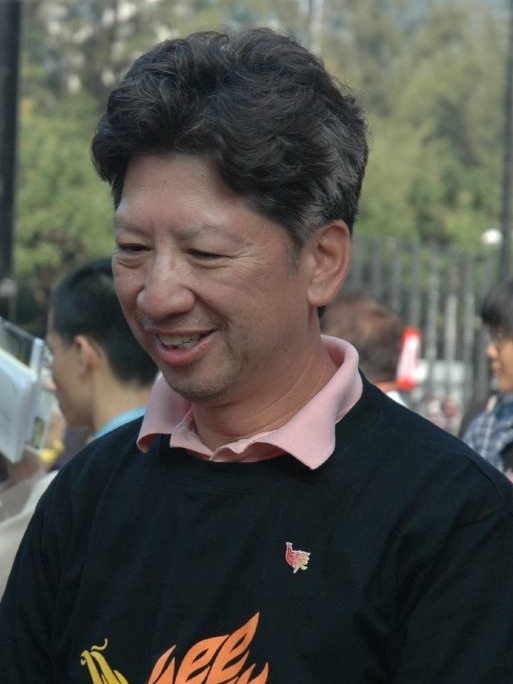
Ronny Tong SC

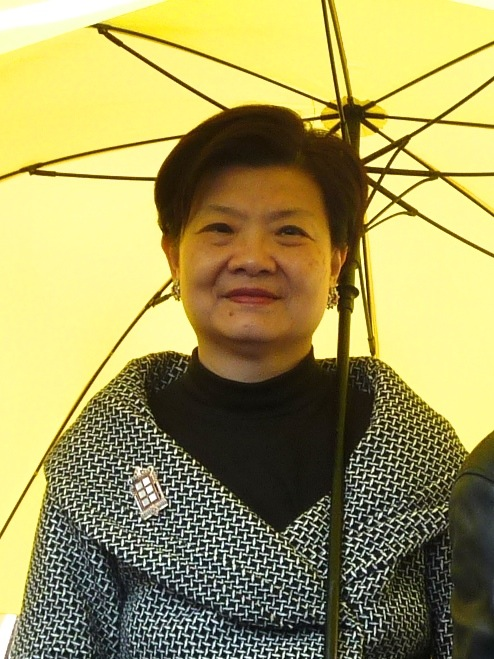
Audrey Eu SC

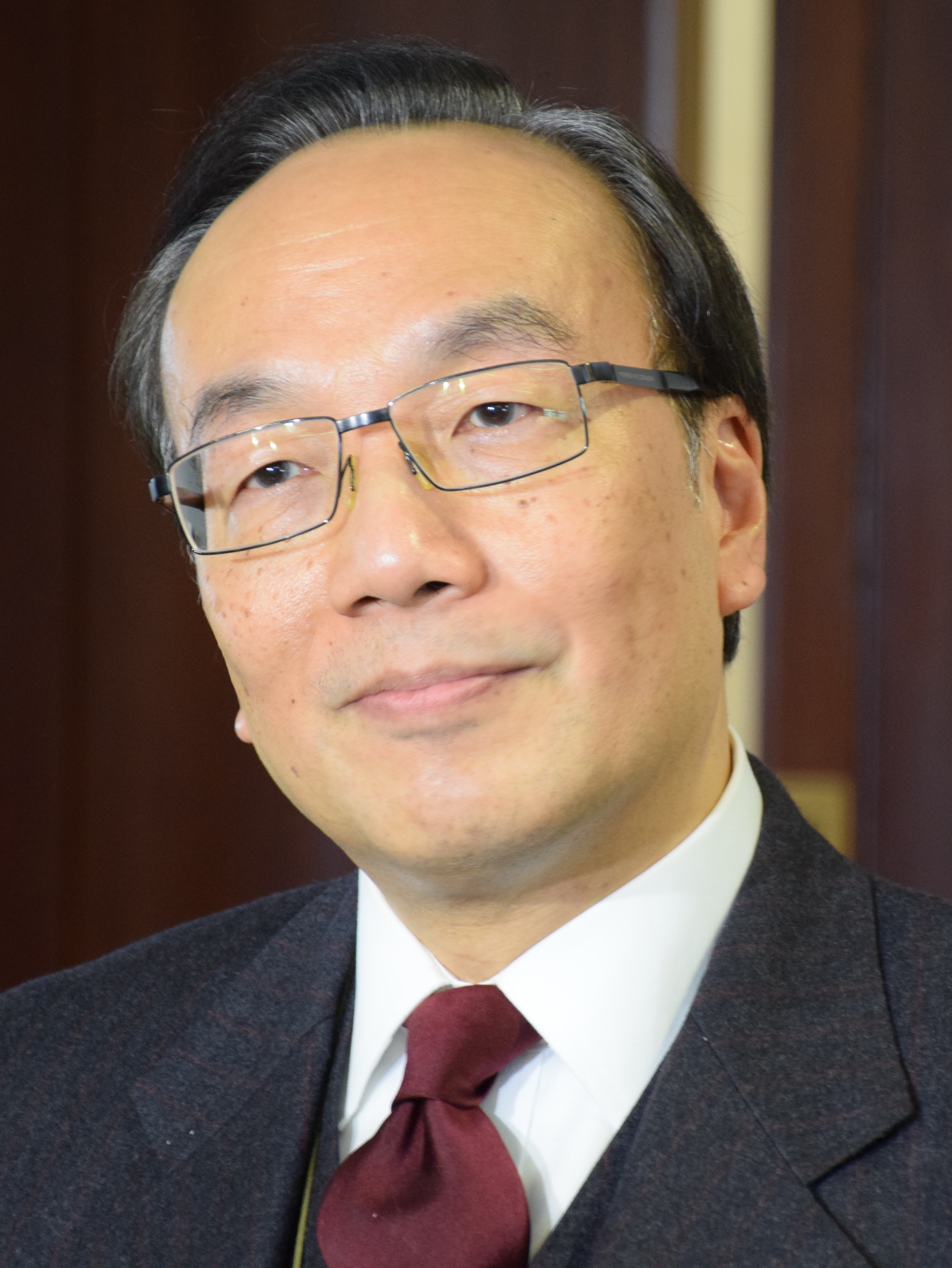
Alan Leong SC

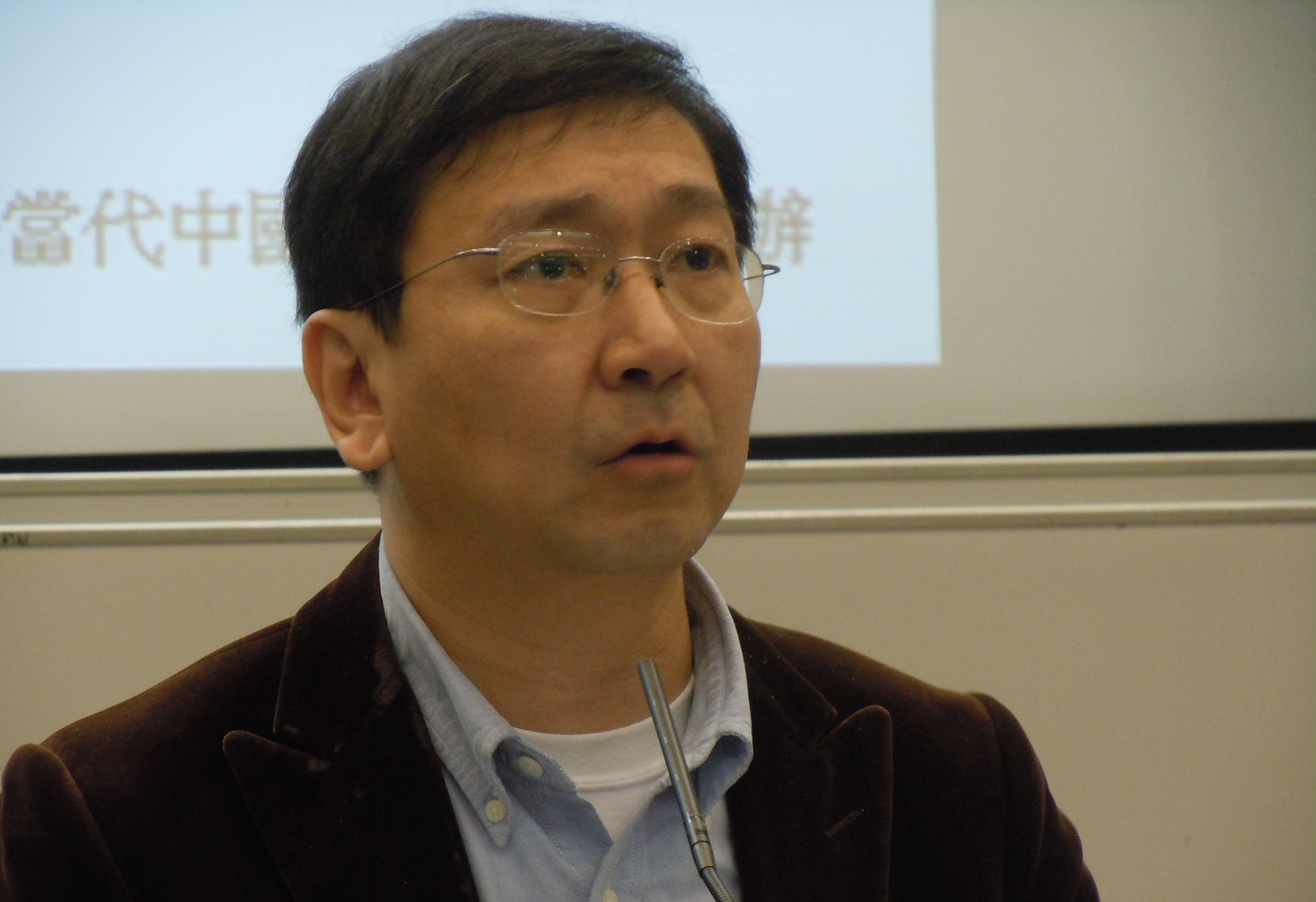
Johannes Chan SC (Hon)

Name	Known for	Degree(s) & year
Andrew Cheung Kui-nung	Chief Justice, Court of Final Appeal (2021-); Permanent Judge of the Court of Final Appeal; 4th Chief Judge of the High Court of Hong Kong (2011-2018)	LLB 1984, PCLL 1985
Elsie Leung	Former Secretary for Justice	LLM
Rimsky Yuen	Former Secretary for Justice (2012-2018); Senior Counsel	LLB
Patrick Chan Siu-oi	Non-Permanent Judge of the Court of Final Appeal; Former Permanent Judge of the Court of Final Appeal; 1st Chief Judge of the High Court of Hong Kong	LLB (Upper 2nd Honours) 1974
Jeremy Poon Shiu-chor	5th Chief Judge of the High Court of Hong Kong (subject to the Legislative Council's endorsement)	LLB (1985), PCLL (1986)
Johnson Lam Man-hon	Vice-President of the Court of Appeal	LLB
Moses Cheng Mo-chi	Former LegCo member (Governor-appointed: 1991-1995), Unofficial member of the Executive Council, HKSAR (2022-2027)	LLB (3rd Hon.) 1974
Wally Yeung	Vice-President of the Court of Appeal	LLB 1974
Albert Ho Chun-yan	Former Member of the Legislative Council (New Territories West)	LLB 1975
Albert H. Y. Chen	Member of the Hong Kong Basic Law Committee of the National People's Congress Standing Committee	LLB 1980
Johannes Chan	First Honorary Senior Counsel in Hong Kong; former dean of the Faculty of Law	LLB
Margaret Ng	Former Member of Legislative Council; Barrister	PCLL 1988
Alan Leong	Former Member of Legislative Council; Senior Counsel	LLB
Audrey Eu	Former Member of Legislative Council; Senior Counsel	LLB
Ronny Tong	Former Member of Legislative Council; Senior Counsel	LLB
Tanya Chan	Member of Legislative Council	LLB
Benjamin Yu	Senior Counsel	LLB
Sinnie Ng	Singer; member of Hong Kong Cantopop group Lolly Talk	BSS(GL) & LLB
Paul Lam Ting-kwok	Secretary for Justice (2022-2027)	LLB 1990, PCLL 1992

== Faculty of Medicine (Renamed as Li Ka Shing Faculty of Medicine in 2006) ==
Name	Known for	Degree(s) & year
Sir Sik-nin Chau	Businessman (served Hongkong Chinese Bank, Kowloon Motor Bus, Diary Farm), former politician (Senior Unofficial Member, Executive Council and Legislative Council)	MBBS 1923
York Chow Yat-ngok	Orthopaedic surgeon, former Secretary for Food and Health (2007-2012)	MBBS 1971
Yuet Wai Kan	Winner of Albert Lasker Award for Clinical Medical Research, Shaw Prize in Life Science	MBBS
Vivian Li	Discovering a new way that Wnt is activated in bowel cancer	PhD in Pathology (2008)
Yuen Kwok-yung	Head of HKU Department of Microbiology	MBBS 1981
Constance Chan Hon-yee	Former Director of Health (2012-2021)	MBBS 1985

== Faculty of Science ==
Name	Known for	Degree(s) & year
Michael Suen	Secretary for Education	BSc (Mathematics and Physics)
Stephen Lam	Chief Secretary for Administration	BSc (Chemistry and Physics)
Rita Fan	Former President of the Legislative Council of Hong Kong	BSc, MSocSc, DSocSc honoris causa
Ambrose Lee	Secretary for Security of Hong Kong (2003–2012)	BSc
Sarah Liao	Former Secretary for the Environment, Transport and Works of HKSAR	BSc 1973, MPhil
Yum Tong Siu	William Elwood Byerly Professor of Mathematics at Harvard University	BA 1963, DSc honoris causa 1990
Ava Yu	Singer, actress, hostess	BSc (Biology) 2007
Aleksandr Kogan	Assistant Professor at University of Cambridge, academic at St Petersburg University, researcher at Cambridge Analytica	PhD
William Ka Ming Lau	Senior Scientist at University of Maryland, Deputy Director for Science, NASA Goddard Space Flight Center Earth Science Division	BSc (Mathematics and Physics) 1972, BSc Honors (Applied Mathematics) 1973

== Faculty of Social Sciences ==
Name	Known for	Degree(s) & year
Carrie Lam Cheng Yuet-ngor	Former Chief Executive of Hong Kong	B.Soc.Sc. 1980
Yuen-Ying Chan	Journalist and professor	
Stanley Ho	Hong Kong and Macau Tycoon, "Gambling King"	DSocSc honoris causa, 1987
Lawrence Fung Siu Por	Chairman, Hong Kong Economic Times (1988-)	B.Soc.Sc. 1972
Samuel Hui	Singer, lyricist, actor	B.Soc.Sc. 1972
Lam Woon-kwong	Former senior civil servant, Hong Kong Government	B.Soc.Sc. (Economics, Sociology) 1974
Antony Leung Kam-chung	Former Financial Secretary of Hong Kong	B.Soc.Sc.
Joseph Yam Chi-kwong	Former CEO of Hong Kong Monetary Authority	
Anthony Cheung Bing-leung	Public Administration scholar	B.Soc.Sc (Economics, Sociology) 1974
Yeung Sum	Member of the Legislative Council (Hong Kong Island)	BA
Lau Siu Kai	Head of the Government's thinktank, the Central Policy Unit	BSocSc
Hsing Yun	Founder of the Fo Guang Shan Buddhist Order	DSocSc honoris causa, 2010
Chan Ying-lun	Member of the Eastern District Board (1982-1991) Member of the Legislative Council, Hong Kong (Governor-Appointed: 1983 September - 1988 August; Electoral College, Hong Kong East: 1988 October - 1991 August)	B.Soc.Sc.
