= Permanent Judges of the Court of Final Appeal =

Hong Kong appellate judges

The Permanent Judges of the Court of Final Appeal are full-time judges sitting on Hong Kong's final appellate court, the Court of Final Appeal. They are called Permanent Judges because they are required to sit on every appeal committee and court case relating to the Court of Final Appeal, and to distinguish them from other part-time jurists who also sit on the top court, known as Non-Permanent Judges.

== History ==
At the founding of the court on 1 July 1997, as the Permanent Judges were all sworn in on the same day, they were sorted by seniority (whichever year they took Silk). The Chief Justice sat in the middle; Henry Litton, being the most senior judge and would sit on the Chief Justice's right, with Charles Ching being the second most senior judge (sitting on the Chief Justice's left) and Kemal Bokhary being the least senior Permanent Judge, sitting on the right of Henry Litton.

== Eligibility ==
According to the Hong Kong Court of Final Appeal Ordinance, Permanent Judges are recommended by the Judicial Officers Recommendation Commission, and officially appointed by the Chief Executive. People may be eligible to become a Permanent Judge by being the Chief Judge of the High Court, a High Court judge, or practiced as a barrister or solicitor in Hong Kong for over 10 years.

In practice, every Permanent Judge appointed has been at least a Justice of Appeal of the Court of Appeal or above (Vice-President, Chief Judge, or Non-Permanent Judge); no practicing barrister has ever been appointed directly as a Permanent Judge without full time judicial experience.

== Length of service ==
Permanent Judges are required to retire by age 70, but this can be extended by up to two three-year terms, so final retirement age may be 76. This came into effect in late 2019, whereas previously the retirement age was 65 (from 1997 to late 2019), also with two three-year extensions possible for a final retirement age of 71.

== List of Permanent Judges ==
There are to be at least three Permanent Judges on the top court at any given time, with the current Judges in bold in the list below.

No.	Name	Place of birth	Age at start	Replacing	Took office	Left office	Tenure length	Previous judicial offices	Higher education	Nationality (if known)	Silk	Appointed by
1	Henry Denis Litton, GBM (Born 7 August 1934; age 91)	Hong Kong	62 years and 329 days	Inaugural	1 July 1997	13 September 2000	3 years and 75 days	Justice of Appeal of the Court of Appeal (1992–95); Vice-President of the Court of Appeal (1995–97)	University of Oxford (MA)	British	QC (1970)	Tung Chee-hwa
2	Charles Arthur Ching, GBM (7 October 1935 – 30 November 2000; aged 65)	Hong Kong	61 years and 268 days	Inaugural	1 July 1997	6 October 2000	3 years and 98 days	Justice of Appeal of the Court of Appeal (1995–97)	University of Oxford (MA)	Australian	QC (1974)	Tung Chee-hwa
3	Syed Kemal Shah Bokhary, GBM (Born 25 October 1947; age 78)	Hong Kong	49 years and 250 days	Inaugural	1 July 1997	24 October 2012	15 years and 116 days	Judge of the High Court of Justice (1989–93); Justice of Appeal of the Court of Appeal (1993–97)	City Law School	British	QC (1983)	Tung Chee-hwa
4	Patrick Chan Siu-oi, GBM (Born 21 October 1948; age 77)	Hong Kong	51 years and 317 days	Litton	1 September 2000	20 October 2013	13 years and 50 days	District Judge (1987–91); Deputy Registrar of the Supreme Court (1991–92); Judge of the High Court of Justice (1992–97); Chief Judge of the High Court (1997–2000)	University of Hong Kong (LLB, PCLL)	Hong Kong		Tung Chee-hwa
**5**	**Roberto Alexandre Vieira Ribeiro, GBM** (Born 20 March 1949; age 77)	Hong Kong	51 years and 166 days	Ching	1 September 2000	Incumbent	25 years and 267 days	Recorder of the Court of First Instance (1997–99); Judge of the Court of First Instance (1999–2000); Justice of Appeal of the Court of Appeal (2000)	London School of Economics (LLB, LLM)	British	QC (1990)	Tung Chee-hwa
6	Robert Tang Kwok-ching, GBM, SBS (Born 7 January 1947; age 79)	Shanghai, China	65 years and 293 days	Bokhary	25 October 2012	24 October 2018	6 years and 0 days	Deputy District Judge (1982); Deputy High Court Judge (1986); Recorder of the High Court of Justice/Court of First Instance (1995–2004); Judge of the Court of First Instance (2004–05); Justice of Appeal of the Court of Appeal (2005–06); Vice-President of the Court of Appeal (2006–12); Non-Permanent Judge of the Court of Final Appeal (2010–12)	University of Birmingham (LLB)	British	QC (1986)	Leung Chun-ying
**7**	**Joseph Paul Fok** (Born 24 September 1962; age 63)	Hong Kong	51 years and 28 days	Chan	21 October 2013	Incumbent	12 years and 217 days	Recorder of the Court of First Instance (2003–09); Judge of the Court of First Instance (2010–11); Justice of Appeal of the Court of Appeal (2011–13)	University College London (LLB); City Law School	British	SC (1999)	Leung Chun-ying
8	Andrew Cheung Kui-nung, GBM (Born 24 September 1961; age 64)	Hong Kong	57 years and 32 days	Tang	25 October 2018	10 January 2021	2 years and 78 days	District Judge (2001–03); Deputy High Court Judge (2001–03); Judge of the Court of First Instance (2003–11); Chief Judge of the High Court (2011–18)	University of Hong Kong (LLB, PCLL); Harvard Law School (LLM)	Hong Kong		Carrie Lam
**9**	**Johnson Lam Man-hon** (Born August 1961; age 64)	Hong Kong	59 years and 11 months (exact birth date not known)	Cheung	30 July 2021	Incumbent	4 years and 300 days	District Judge (2001–03); Judge of the Court of First Instance (2003–12); Justice of Appeal of the Court of Appeal (2012–13); Vice-President of the Court of Appeal (2013–21)	University of Hong Kong (LLB, PCLL)			Carrie Lam

== Education ==
=== By PCLL ===
Note: A PCLL is separate from a graduate degree, commonly known as the LLM or BCL

1. University of Hong Kong (3) – Chan, Cheung, Lam

=== By graduate degree ===
1. London School of Economics (1) – Ribeiro
2. Harvard University (1) – Cheung

=== By undergraduate degree ===
1. University of Hong Kong (3) – Chan, Cheung, Lam
2. University of Oxford (2) – Litton, Ching
3. London School of Economics (1) – Ribeiro
4. University of Birmingham (1) – Tang
5. University College London (1) – Fok

== Length of tenure ==
Rank	Justice	Length served (in days)
1	Roberto Ribeiro	9,397 (incumbent, continuing)
2	Kemal Bokhary	5,594
3	Patrick Chan	4,797
4	Joseph Fok	4,599 (incumbent, continuing)
5	Robert Tang	2,190
6	Johnson Lam	1,760 (incumbent, continuing)
7	Charles Ching	1,193
8	Henry Litton	1,170
9	Andrew Cheung	808

== See also ==
- Court of Final Appeal (Hong Kong)
- Chief Justice of the Court of Final Appeal
