= Vice presidents of the Court of Appeal of Hong Kong =

Senior judges on the Hong Kong Court of Appeal

Vice President of the Court of Appeal
- 上訴庭副庭長
- Incumbent; Andrew Macrae; Susan Kwan; Carlye Chu
- Style: The Honourable
- Status: Justice of Appeal
- Member of: Court of Appeal
- Appointer: Chief Judge of the High Court
- Constituting instrument: High Court Ordinance (Cap. 4)
- Inaugural holder: Sir Alan Armstrong Huggins
- Formation: 1987

The vice presidents of the Court of Appeal of Hong Kong are senior justices of appeal who have been appointed by the chief judge of the High Court of Hong Kong to preside over a division of the Court of Appeal. Originally, there were only two vice presidents, dealing with the criminal and civil divisions respectively. This later grew to three to include a mixed division, and occasionally up to four to help ease the burden of workload on each vice president.

== Role and responsibilities ==
The vice-presidents usually preside over an appeal hearing unless the chief judge is sitting, then the chief judge presides. From an order of precedence standpoint, they are more senior than regular justices of appeal and often are given some administrative responsibilities by the chief judge. However, from a judicial judgement standpoint, vice presidents, like the Chief Judge, are the same as any Justice of Appeal and do not possess any greater power during appeals.

== List of vice presidents ==
#	Name	Tenure	Subsequent promotions	Silk	Ref
1	Sir Alan Armstrong Huggins	1980–1987	Non-Permanent Judge of the Court of Final Appeal (retired)		
2	Simon Li Fook-sean, GBM	1984–1987	Retired		
3	Sir Derek Cons	1986–1993	Non-Permanent Judge of the Court of Final Appeal (retired)		
4	Sir Ti-liang Yang, GBM	1987–1988	Chief Justice of the Supreme Court of Hong Kong (retired)		
5	William James Silke	1987–1994	Non-Permanent Judge of the Court of Final Appeal (retired)		
6	Kutlu Tekin Fuad	1988–1993	Non-Permanent Judge of the Court of Final Appeal (retired)		
7	Sir Noel Plunkett Power, GBS	1993–1999	Non-Permanent Judge of the Court of Final Appeal (retired)		
8	Gerald Paul Nazareth, GBS	1994–2000	Non-Permanent Judge of the Court of Final Appeal (retired)	QC (1981)	
9	Henry Denis Litton, GBM	1995–1997	Permanent Judge of the Court of Final Appeal (retired) (also Non-Permanent Judge of the Court of Final Appeal)	QC (1970)	
10	John Barry Mortimer, GBS	1997–1999	Non-Permanent Judge of the Court of Final Appeal (retired)	QC (1971)	
11	Michael Stuart-Moore, GBS	1999–2009	Retired	QC (1990)	
12	Gerald Michael Godfrey	2000	Retired	QC (1971)	
13	Simon Herbert Mayo, GBS	2000–2002	Retired		
14	Anthony Gordon Rogers, GBS	2000–2011	Retired	QC (1984)	
15	Woo Kwok-hing, GBS	2004–2011	Retired	QC (1987)	
16	Robert Tang Kwok-ching, GBM, SBS	2006–2012	Permanent Judge of the Court of Final Appeal (retired) (also Non-Permanent Judge of the Court of Final Appeal)	QC (1986)	
17	Frank Stock, GBS	2009–2014	Non-Permanent Judge of the Court of Final Appeal	QC (1985)	
18	Wally Yeung Chun-kuen, GBS	2011–2021	Retired		
19	Johnson Lam Man-hon	2013–2021	Permanent Judge of the Court of Final Appeal		
20	Michael Victor Lunn, GBS	2014–2018	Retired	QC (1994)	
21	Andrew Colin Macrae	2018–		SC (1999)	
22	Susan Kwan Shuk-hing	2019–			
23	Carlye Chu Fun-ling	2022–			
