= Chief Justice of Hong Kong =

Chief Justice of Hong Kong may refer to:

- Chief Justice of the Court of Final Appeal, a position created in 1997 as the head of the Hong Kong judiciary and president of the Court of Final Appeal
- Chief Justice of the Supreme Court of Hong Kong, a position that existed between 1844 and 1997 as the head of the judiciary and the top judge on the Supreme Court. Upon the handover of Hong Kong in 1997, the former role was assumed by the Chief Justice of the Court of Final Appeal, while the Chief Judge of the High Court took up the latter role.
