= Alan Huggins =

British colonial judge

Sir Alan Huggins
- 赫健士爵士
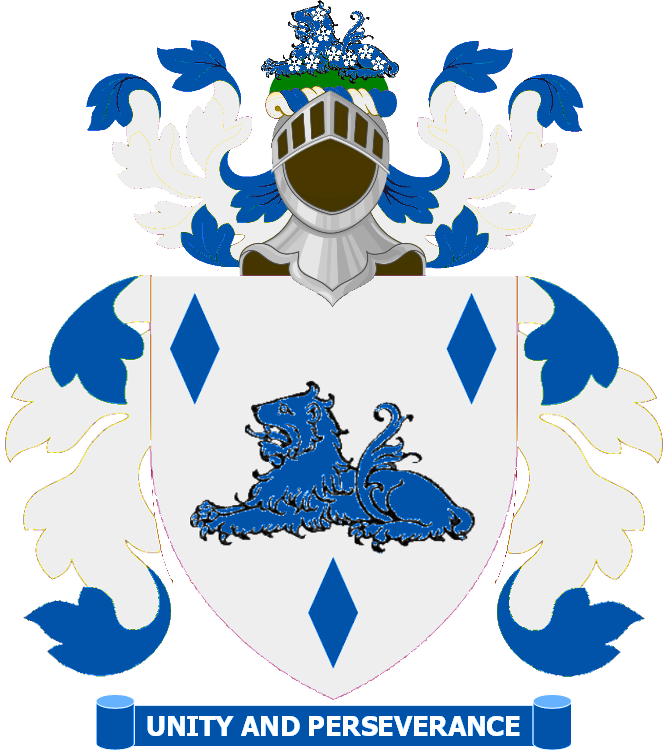

Non-Permanent Judge of the Court of Final Appeal
- In office 1997–2003

Justice of Appeal
- In office 1976–1987

Puisne Judge of the Supreme Court
- In office 1976–1965

Personal details
- Born: 15 May 1921 Middlesex, England
- Died: 10 December 2009 (aged 88) Devon, England
- Education: Sidney Sussex College, Cambridge (MA)
- Occupation: Judge

Sir Alan Armstrong Huggins (Traditional Chinese: 赫健士爵士, 15 May 1921 – 10 December 2009) was a British colonial judge serving in places including Uganda, Hong Kong and Brunei. He spent nearly 40 years in the judiciary of Hong Kong, serving as a Vice-President of the Court of Appeal from 1980 to 1987. After the transfer of sovereignty over Hong Kong in 1997, he was appointed a non-permanent Hong Kong judge of the Court of Final Appeal until 2003.

== Biography ==
=== Early years ===
Alan Huggins was born in Staines, Middlesex, on 15 May 1921 to William Armstrong Huggins, a Lloyd's underwriter, and Dale Copping. He had an elder brother called Eric. His family was related to Viscount Malvern (1883–1971), Prime Minister of Southern Rhodesia. Huggins was educated at Radley College from 1936 to 1939. He went on to study law at Sidney Sussex College, Cambridge, in 1939, where he subsequently obtained a MA degree in 1941.

During the Second World War Huggins served at the Salvage Branch of the Admiralty from 1941 to 1946, and belonged to the Territorial Army Reserve of Officers from 1940 to 1948. After being called to the bar by Lincoln's Inn in 1947, he worked at the chambers of Lionel Blundell, QC, in King's Bench Walk for four years from 1947 to 1951.

=== Judicial career ===
In 1951, Huggins entered the Colonial Service and followed his elder brother to Africa, becoming a resident magistrate in Kampala, Uganda. However, his first wife did not want to stay in Africa after her sister-in-law was murdered by a servant in Salisbury, Southern Rhodesia. In 1953, Huggins was therefore transferred to Hong Kong as a stipendiary magistrate and the president of the Tenancy Tribunals. He later became a magistrate in the New Territories in 1955, the First Magistrate of Kowloon in 1956, and was promoted as a district judge in 1958.

Huggins was appointed a puisne judge of the Supreme Court in 1965. Hong Kong was then in a time of social instability, and at one point, his family received death threats and needed police protection after his winding-up of a local bank. In 1976, he was further promoted as a Justice of Appeal. Huggins had the opportunity to become the Chief Justice in 1979 when the seat was vacant, but the government selected then Chief Secretary, Sir Denys Roberts. Huggins was instead appointed a Vice-President of the Court of Appeal and became a Knight Bachelor in the 1980 Birthday Honours. He received the knighthood in person from Queen Elizabeth II at Buckingham Palace in the following year. Huggins served as the acting Chief Justice on a number of occasions during his capacity as the Vice-President and retired subsequently in 1987. Huggins was also the chairman of the Advisory Committee on Legal Education from 1972 to 1987 and an honorary lecturer at the University of Hong Kong from 1979 to 1987.

Apart from his judicial career in Hong Kong, Huggins was the Judicial Commissioner in the Supreme Court of Brunei from 1966 to 1983. He remained in the same position until 1987 after the independence of Brunei from Britain in 1984. From 1991 to 2000, he was once again appointed as the Judicial Commissioner. He then became the President of the Court of Appeal of Brunei from 2000 until 2002.

=== Later years ===
Huggins resided in Widdicombe, Devon, in his retirement but he was occasionally invited to serve as a Justice of Appeal for the Falkland Islands, the British Antarctic Territory, Gibraltar, St Helena, the British Indian Ocean Territory and Bermuda. After the transfer of sovereignty over Hong Kong in 1997, Huggins, along with other colonial judges such as Sir Denys Roberts, Art McMullin, Sir Derek Cons and Sir Noel Power, was appointed as one of the first non-permanent Hong Kong judges of the Hong Kong Court of Final Appeal, serving for a three-year term. He later served for another three-year term from 2000 to 2003.

Huggins died in Devon on 10 December 2009, aged 88. A memorial service was held in the St Michael and All Angels Church, Kingsbridge, on 29 December. Both the judiciaries of Hong Kong and Brunei mourned over the death of Huggins, with the Chief Justice of Hong Kong Andrew Li praised that he "won the respect and admiration of everyone through his legal learning, sense of justice and devotion to duty. He set the highest standards and applied himself tirelessly to maintain those standards at all times." Robert Ribeiro, a permanent judge of the Court of Final Appeal, also paid tribute to Huggins, saying that "the widely shared sentiment in the legal community is that Hong Kong will always be grateful for the lasting contribution Sir Alan made to the foundations of our present system of law".

== Personal life ==
Huggins married, firstly, Catherine Davidson Dick, in Laleham, Surrey, on 2 December 1950. The couple had two sons and a daughter, namely, Adrian, Roger Davidson and Rosemary Anne. However, his first marriage ended in divorce. In 1985, he married, secondly, Elizabeth Low, in Hong Kong. The wedding ceremony was presided over by the Chief Justice, Sir Denys Roberts, in his official residence on the Peak. The second Lady Huggins died in 2007.

Huggins was a lover of amateur dramatics. He played roles ranging from Shylock in The Merchant of Venice to the pantomime cow in Jack and the Beanstalk. He was also a Christian of traditional religious beliefs, serving as an honorary governor of the British and Foreign Bible Society, a life member of the American Bible Society, president of the Chinese YMCA of Hong Kong and a diocesan reader of Hong Kong and Macao.

== Honours ==
- Knight Bachelor (1980)

Coat of arms of Alan Huggins

Crest
On a wreath of the colours on a mount Vert a lion couchant Azure semée of cinquefoils Argent.
Escutcheon
Argent a lion couchant between three fusils Azure.
Motto
Unity And Perseverance

== See also ==
- Supreme Court of Hong Kong
- Denys Roberts
