= Arthur Leong (judge) =

The Honourable Mr Justice Arthur Leong GBS
- 梁紹中

2nd Chief Judge of the High Court of Hong Kong
- In office 2000–2003

Justice of Appeal High Court
- In office 1997–2000

Judge of the Court of First Instance of the High Court
- In office 1991–1997

District Court
- In office 1982–1991

Personal details
- Born: 1936 Hong Kong
- Education: Wah Yan College, Kowloon, Middle Temple

Arthur Leong GBS (Chinese: 梁紹中; 1936–2010) was a judge in Hong Kong. He was Chief Judge of the High Court of Hong Kong from 2000 to 2003.

== Early life ==
Leong completed his secondary education at Wah Yan College, Kowloon.

He joined the Hong Kong Government in 1954 and for 9 years between 1954 and 1963, he worked successively in the then Prisons Department, the Royal Observatory and the Labour Department. In 1963, he resigned from the government to qualify as a barrister in England. He was called to the bar of the Middle Temple in 1965.

== Legal career ==
Leong started his legal career in the Legal Department and was soon promoted to Crown Counsel. During that time he was engaged for some time as a law draftsman.

In 1973 he was appointed a magistrate. He also sat for a time as Presiding Officer at the Labour Tribunal.

In 1982, he was promoted as a judge of the District Court of Hong Kong. He became a judge of the Supreme Court of Hong Kong in 1991 and was appointed to the Court of Appeal in 1997. The Supreme Court of Hong Kong was renamed the High Court of Hong Kong when Hong Kong was returned to China on 1 July 1997.

Leong was due to retire in 2000, but was appointed Chief Judge of the High Court of Hong Kong in that year and had his term of office extended for 2 and a half years.

He retired from the judiciary in July 2003. In a retirement speech, the Chief Justice Andrew Li said of Leong:

"As a Judge, Mr Justice Leong was versatile. His important contribution covered a wide field, including both civil and criminal cases, and embraces both trial work at all levels and in recent years, appellate work. He has made a particularly significant contribution to the development of the bilingual capacity of our courts. In relation to the use of Chinese, his work has been of pivotal importance."

== Post-retiremement ==
Leong remained active in retirement. In 2003 he was appointed chairman of the Administrative Appeals Tribunal.

He later served as Chief Adjudicator of the Immigration Tribunal and as Chairman of the Post-Release Supervision Board.

In 2006, he sat as a Deputy High Court Judge.

== Awards ==
In 2003, Justice Leong was awarded the Gold Bauhinia Star, one of the highest honours given by the HKSAR Government.

== Death ==
Leong died in August 2010.

Legal offices
Preceded by Patrick Chan	Chief Judge of the High Court; 2000–2003	Succeeded by Geoffrey Ma
