= Geoffrey Ma =

Hong Kong judge (born 1956)

The Honourable Geoffrey Ma Tao-li GBM KC SC
- 馬道立
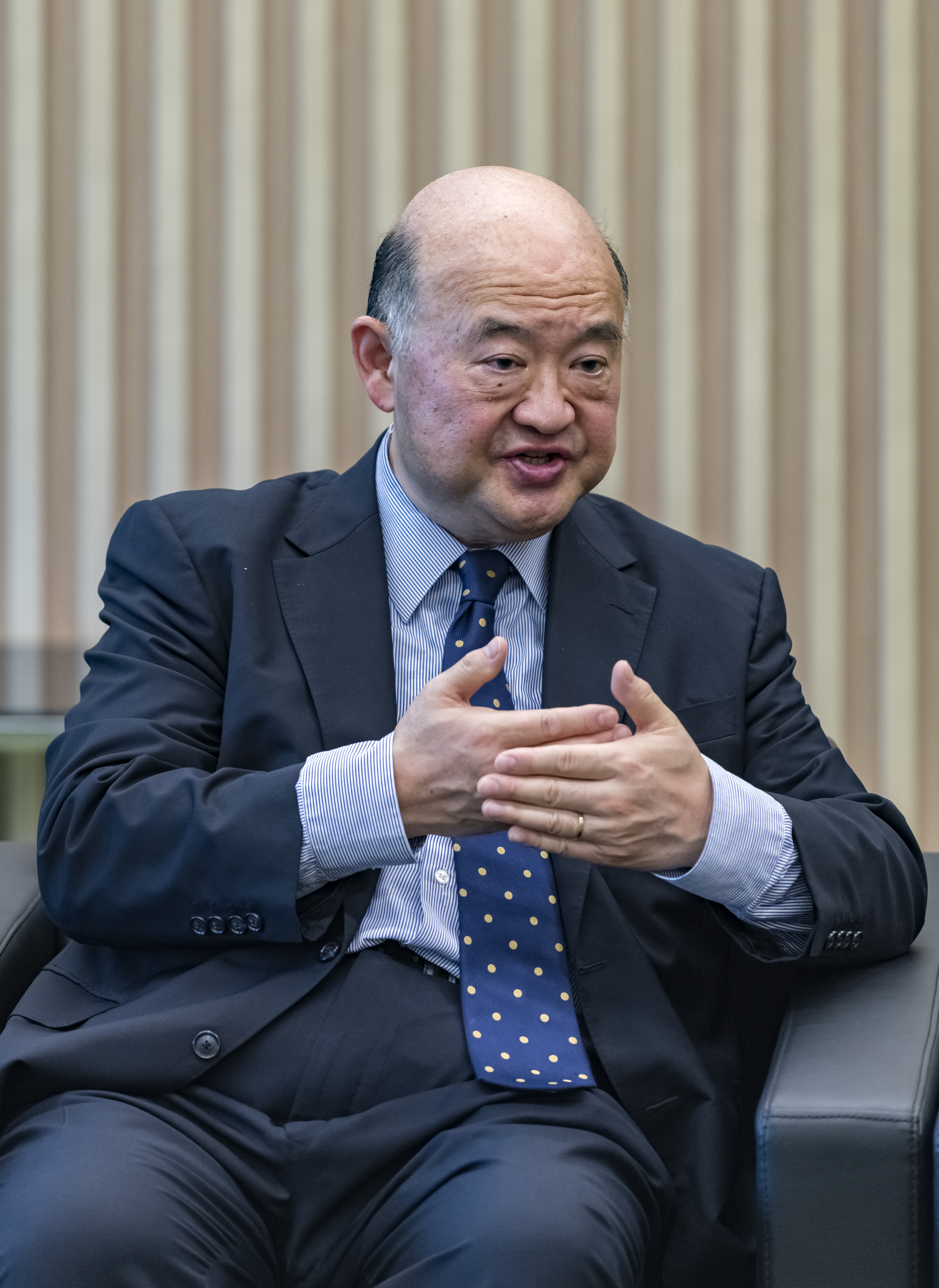
- Ma in 2017

2nd Chief Justice of the Court of Final Appeal
- In office 1 September 2010 – 11 January 2021
- Appointed by: Donald Tsang
- Preceded by: Andrew Li
- Succeeded by: Andrew Cheung

Designated National Security Law Judge
- In office 2020–2021
- Appointed by: Carrie Lam

3rd Chief Judge of the High Court
- In office 14 July 2003 – 31 August 2010
- Appointed by: Tung Chee Hwa
- Preceded by: Arthur Leong
- Succeeded by: Andrew Cheung

Justice of Appeal of the Court of Appeal of the High Court
- In office 2002–2003

Judge of the Court of First Instance of the High Court
- In office 2001–2002

Personal details
- Born: 11 January 1956 (age 70) British Hong Kong
- Spouse: Maria Yuen
- Education: University of Birmingham

Geoffrey Ma
- Traditional Chinese: 馬道立
- Simplified Chinese: 马道立
Transcriptions
Standard Mandarin
- Hanyu Pinyin: Mǎ Dàolì
Yue: Cantonese
- Yale Romanization: Máh Douh lahp
- Jyutping: Maa^{5} Dou^{6} lap^{6}

Geoffrey Ma Tao-li GBM KC SC (Chinese: 馬道立; born 11 January 1956) is a retired Hong Kong judge who served as the 2nd Chief Justice of the Hong Kong Court of Final Appeal—the court of last resort (or supreme court) in Hong Kong. Between 2001 and 2010, he held various positions in the High Court of Hong Kong, including Chief Judge, Justice of Appeal, and Judge of the Court of First Instance. Before his judicial career, he was a barrister-at-law in private practice at Temple Chambers in Hong Kong and legal consultant to Messrs. David Chong & Co in Singapore, and was qualified to practice in England and Wales, Hong Kong, Australia and Singapore. He now practices at Temple Chambers as an arbitrator and mediator, and at Brick Court Chambers as a door tenant.

== Early life and education ==
Ma was born in Hong Kong in 1956, the son of an electrical engineer. His great-grandfather was the imam of the Muslim community in Shanghai before the Second Sino-Japanese War. His parents moved to Hong Kong from Tianjin in the late 1940s. In the 1960s, after Ma was born, his family moved to Manchester in the United Kingdom, where he went to Altrincham Grammar School.

Ma studied Law at the University of Birmingham. He graduated with an LLB in 1977. After finishing the professional legal training at the College of Law (University of Law), he passed his Bar Finals in 1978.

== Legal career (1978–2001) ==
In 1978, Ma was called to the Bar by Gray's Inn in London and commenced his practice as a barrister in England and Wales; he was then called to Bar in Hong Kong, State of Victoria, Australia and Singapore in 1980, 1983 and 1990 respectively. He was appointed Queen's Counsel in 1993. During his time as a barrister, Ma was instructed in many high-profile cases, playing what the South China Morning Post described as a "pivotal role" in shaping Hong Kong's new constitutional order. He represented the government in many cases, including the Director of Immigration in the right of abode cases. He was the Head of Chambers at Temple Chambers in Hong Kong, and legal consultant to Messrs David Chong & Co in Singapore, as head of litigation, shipping, and admiralty departments, prior to his appointment to the bench.

== Judicial career (2001–2021) ==
He was appointed by the Hong Kong Judiciary as Recorder of the Court of First Instance of the High Court in December 2000. In December 2001, Ma became a Judge of the Court of First Instance of the High Court. In 2002, Ma was elevated to the position of Justice of Appeal of the Court of Appeal of the High Court. In July 2003, he was appointed as Chief Judge of the High Court.

Ma was also a member of the Working Party on Civil Justice Reform, which came into effect in April 2009 and is aimed at lowering legal costs and improving assess to justice. Addressing almost 200 legal professionals at a forum in April 2010, Ma criticised judges for being too lenient in civil proceedings with time-wasting parties and encouraged judges to fully use their new case management power under the Civil Justice Reform to ensure expediency. He also warned lawyers against devising new tactics to make civil proceedings unnecessarily lengthy and inefficient.

On 8 April 2010, it was announced that the Chief Executive Donald Tsang accepted the recommendation of the Judicial Officers Recommendation Commission to appoint Ma as the successor to the Chief Justice of the Court of Final Appeal Andrew Li. Ma was succeeded by Andrew Cheung as Chief Judge of the High Court. On 9 June 2010, Ma's appointment was approved by the Legislative Council by a majority vote.

Ma held numerous public appointments, which include serving as an associate member of the London Maritime Arbitrators Association, an honorary lecturer of the Department of Professional Legal Education of the University of Hong Kong, a member of the Criminal and Law Enforcement Injuries Compensation Board, a member of the High Court Civil Court Users Committee, a member of the Hong Kong Futures Exchange Disciplinary Appeal Tribunal, chairman of the Appeal Tribunal Panel (Buildings), deputy chairman of the SFC Appeals Panel, and deputy chairman of the SFC Takeovers Appeals Committee. Ma is a patron of the Bingham Centre for the Rule of Law; he is also a patron of the International Advocacy Training Council.

In October 2019, Ma announced his intention to step down from his position as Chief Justice in January 2021, when he turned 65.

== Post-retirement career ==
Since retiring, Ma has returned to private practice as an arbitrator and mediator in Temple Chambers (where he was Head of Chambers prior to joining the Judiciary), and Brick Court Chambers, London. He has also been appointed as Honorary Professor of both the University of Hong Kong's and the Chinese University of Hong Kong's respective law faculties.

== Public image ==
Legislator and Senior Counsel Audrey Eu and Ronny Tong believed Ma will continue to defend the independence of the Hong Kong judiciary, but described him as sometimes a little too "conservative." Tong cited an appeal from September 2009 when Ma and fellow judges criticised the government for not disclosing information but eventually ruled in favour of an Immigration Department decision to deny entry to Falun Gong practitioners on "security grounds." Also, in December 2008, he was part of a Court of Appeal panel that overturned a lower court ruling that acquitted the operators of Citizens' Radio of unlicensed broadcasting.

Nevertheless, the Hong Kong Bar Association stressed that Ma commands "deep respect" and is "eminently qualified". Similarly, Hong Kong Human Rights Monitor Director Law Yuk-kai said he was pleased to see Ma's rich experience in public law. "He is strong in public law. He has the competence to protect constitutional rights," Law said. "Of course we were disappointed about some cases, but I don't think he is going out of the way to side with the government. I hope he understands that his role is very important. Hong Kong doesn't have democracy. We expect there is at least one branch of government that serves as the last protector of our rights and interests."

After Ma announced his retirement as Chief Justice, Carrie Lam thanked him for his staunch commitment and relentless efforts in safeguarding the rule of law and promoting the international status of the Judiciary, particularly among common law jurisdictions. She also commended his sterling contribution in enhancing the efficiency, effectiveness and transparency of judicial administration.

In his retirement sitting, Lord Neuberger delivered (remotely) a farewell address in which he paid tribute to Ma's role in upholding and defending the independence of the judiciary during his tenure as Chief Justice, and described Ma as "a man whom I admire greatly, both as a Judge and as an individual, and whom I am proud to count as a friend".

== Honours and awards ==
Ma was awarded the Grand Bauhinia Medal in June 2012 by the Hong Kong Government, and the title of Officier de l’Ordre de la Legion d’Honneur was conferred on him by the French Government in 2015. He was elected an honorary bencher of Gray's Inn in 2004, making him the third person in Hong Kong to be conferred with such honour. He was made an honorary fellow of Harris Manchester College, Oxford in 2012; he also serves as a member of the advisory board of the Commercial Law Centre at the college.

On 15 November 2016, Ma was elected as an Honorary Bencher of the Middle Temple.

== Personal life ==
Ma is married to Maria Yuen, who is a Justice of Appeal of the Court of Appeal of the High Court. They have one daughter. To avoid any possible conflict of interest during his capacity in the Judiciary, Ma has never heard appeals from cases in which Yuen had sat, nor did he ever deal with any administrative matter concerning her.

Legal offices
Preceded by Arthur Leong	Chief Judge of the High Court; 2003–2010	Succeeded by Andrew Cheung
New creation	Designated National Security Law Judge; 2020–2021	Succeeded by Retirement
Preceded by Andrew Li	Chief Justice of the Court of Final Appeal; 2010–2021	Succeeded by Andrew Cheung
