= Jeremy Poon =

Hong Kong judge

The Honourable Mr Justice Jeremy Poon Shiu-chor CJHC
- 潘兆初

5th Chief Judge of the High Court
- Incumbent
- Assumed office 18 December 2019

Designated National Security Law Judge
- Incumbent
- Assumed office 2021
- Appointed by: Carrie Lam

Justice of Appeal of the Court of Appeal of the High Court
- In office 2015–2019

Judge of the Court of First Instance of the High Court
- In office 2006–2015

Deputy Registrar of the High Court
- In office 1999–2006

Magistrate
- In office 1993–1996

Personal details
- Born: February 1962 (age 64) British Hong Kong
- Education: University of Hong Kong (LLB, PCLL); University College London (LLM)

Jeremy Poon Shiu-chor
- Chinese: 潘兆初
Transcriptions
Standard Mandarin
- Hanyu Pinyin: Pān Zhàochū
Yue: Cantonese
- Jyutping: pun1 siu6 co1

Jeremy Poon Shiu-chor (Chinese: 潘兆初; born 1962) is a Hong Kong jurist, currently serving as the 5th Chief Judge of the High Court of Hong Kong since December 2019.

He has served as President of the Scout Council of the Scout Association of Hong Kong since 2018.

== Biography ==
=== Early life and education ===
Poon was born in Hong Kong in 1962.

Poon received a Bachelor of Laws in 1985 and a Postgraduate Certificate in Laws in 1986, both from the University of Hong Kong. He received a Master of Laws from University College London in the United Kingdom in 1987.

=== Legal and judicial career ===
Poon was called to the Hong Kong Bar in 1986 and was a barrister in private practice between 1988 and 1993.

In 1993, Poon joined the bench as a Permanent Magistrate. He sat as a Presiding Officer in the Labour Tribunal. Poon was appointed as Deputy Registrar of the High Court in 1999 and as Judge of Court of First Instance of the High Court in 2006. From 2011 to 2015, he was the Civil Listing Judge and the Judge in charge of the Probate List, the Family Law List and the Mental Health List.

In 2012, Poon acted as Returning Officer for the 2012 Hong Kong Chief Executive election.

In 2015, Poon was elevated to the Court of Appeal.

On 22 May 2019, acting on the recommendation of the independent Judicial Officers Recommendation Commission, the Chief Executive announced Poon's appointment as Chief Judge of the High Court (a post which had become vacant upon the appointment of Andrew Cheung as a Permanent Judge of the Court of Final Appeal in October 2018), subject to the endorsement of the Legislative Council in accordance with Article 90 of the Basic Law. Pending the Legislative Council's endorsement, Poon was appointed as Acting Chief Judge of the High Court on 1 August 2019. After the Legislative Council endorsed Poon's appointment, Poon became Chief Judge of the High Court with effect from 18 December 2019.

In January 2021, Poon was appointed as a member of the Judicial Officers Recommendation Commission.

=== Opinions ===
==== Small house policy ====
In January 2021, Poon ruled that all three methods of building land under the Small House Policy were completely legal, overturning an earlier decision in 2019. Poon told the plaintiffs, Hendrick Lui Chi-hang and Kwok Cheuk-kin, that they did not have sufficient standing to bring up the case because they do not own land rights in the New Territories. In response, a member of the Liber Research Community said that "The ding right affects every Hong Kong citizen as it competes with other land uses for land resources. The government has had to reserve lots of space in new towns for villagers to build their homes, while the land could have been better used for higher-density developments. How can the court say we have no stake in the issue?"

==== National security law ====
In October 2022, Poon said that if there are any contradictions between the Basic Law and Hong Kong national security law, the national security law should take priority.

==== Jimmy Lai ====
In October 2022, Poon was part of a team of 3 judges who ruled against Jimmy Lai and said that "despite its importance to the freedom of the press, the protection afforded to journalistic material is not absolute."

In May 2023, the Congressional-Executive Commission on China (CECC) of the United States Congress suggested the United States government imposing sanctions on Poon to counter the erosion of democratic freedoms in Hong Kong over his handling of Jimmy Lai's case. The same month, Poon rejected attempts by Lai to challenge the national security committee's decision to ban Lai from hiring Tim Owen.

In August 2023, Poon ruled that Lai's two judicial challenges were "unreasonable" and ordered Lai to pay the costs of the challenges.

Legal offices
Preceded by Andrew Cheung	Chief Judge of the High Court; 2019–present	Incumbent
New creation	Designated National Security Law Judge; 2021–Present	Incumbent
