= Chief Judge of the High Court of Hong Kong =

Senior administrative judicial official

- 香港高等法院首席法官
- Emblem of Hong Kong
- Style: The Honourable
- Appointer: Chief Executive of Hong Kong on the recommendation of the Judicial Officers Recommendation Commission with endorsement by the Legislative Council
- Term length: Life tenure (until statutory retirement at age 70, but may be extended by 5 years until age 75)
- Inaugural holder: Patrick Chan Siu-oi, 1997
- Formation: 1 July 1997; 29 years ago

Chief Judge of the High Court of Hong Kong
- Traditional Chinese: 香港高等法院首席法官
Transcriptions
Yue: Cantonese
- Yale Romanization: Hēung góng gōu dáng faat yuhn sáu jihk faat gūn
- Jyutping: Hoeng1 gong2 gou1 dang2 faat3 jyun6 sau2 zik6 faat3 gun1

The Chief Judge of the High Court of Hong Kong (CJHC) is the head of the High Court of Hong Kong and the President of the Court of Appeal of Hong Kong. In the Hong Kong order of precedence, the Chief Judge is the second most senior administrative judge for the courts system, second only to the Chief Justice of the Court of Final Appeal of Hong Kong. The position of Chief Judge is the broad equivalent of the Master of the Rolls in the courts system of England and Wales.

Jeremy Poon is the 5th and current Chief Judge of the High Court of Hong Kong, having taken up the post in December 2019.

== Background ==
The Chief Judge heads the High Court of Hong Kong, which deals with criminal and civil cases that have risen beyond the lower courts. While the High Court consists of the Court of Appeal and the Court of First Instance, the Chief Judge himself generally only presides over appellate cases in the Court of Appeal, usually together with two other Justices of Appeal. The Chief Judge sits alone in the Court of First Instance to hear contested applications for the ad hoc admission of overseas counsel to the Hong Kong Bar.

In accordance with the Basic Law, the Chief Judge is appointed by the Chief Executive based on the recommendation of the Judicial Officers Recommendation Commission (JORC), and made official after receiving approval from the Legislative Council. The Chief Judge, along with the Chief Justice, is one of two positions in the Hong Kong Judiciary that has a nationality requirement (no dual nationality allowed).

== Duties of the Chief Judge ==
The Chief Judge is the Court Leader of the High Court and the President of the Court of Appeal, and is responsible for ensuring the 'efficient utilisation of judicial resources and court time, for advising the Chief Justice on matters of policy concerning the operation and development of the High Court'.

From a judicial stand point, the role of the Chief Judge is equivalent to a Justice of Appeal (but with a seniority ahead of both a Justice of Appeal or a Vice-President), and comes with significant additional administrative responsibilities. This may lead to justices turning down the appointment; for example, after Andrew Cheung's promotion to the Court of Final Appeal, it was reported that the Chief Justice originally asked Johnson Lam to be Chief Judge. However, citing the increase in administrative responsibilities, he turned down this role, which ultimately went to Jeremy Poon. Geoffrey Ma, when he was Chief Judge, stated that he spent "less than 50% of his time in court" as most of his time was consumed over administrative issues. Former Hong Kong Bar Association chairman Ronny Tong SC also said of the post: "The job of the chief judge is mainly administrative and not much relating to giving judgments. So whether the candidate is conservative or not does not matter."

The Chief Judge has the power to admit barristers and solicitors and for implementing Civil Justice Reform. Given the experience of balancing hearing appeals and administrative responsibilities, they are often seen as prime candidates for elevation to the role of Chief Justice.

=== Acting Chief Judge ===
During a period of absence, an Acting Chief Judge of the High Court is appointed 'until the vacancy therein is filled'. In general, a Vice-President of the Court of Appeal is appointed as Acting Chief Judge of the High Court, while a Justice of Appeal may also be appointed during this period if necessary.

== Chief Judges of the High Court ==
№	Name	Tenure start	Tenure end	Tenure length	Higher education	Previous judicial roles	Tenure end reason	Inner bar	Appointed by
1	Patrick Chan Siu-oi, GBM 陳兆愷 (born 1948; age 77)	1 July 1997	31 August 2000	3 years and 62 days	University of Hong Kong (LLB, PCLL)	District Judge (1987–91); Deputy Registrar of the Supreme Court (1991–92); Judge of the High Court of Justice (1992–97)	Appointed as Permanent Judge of the Court of Final Appeal (retired)		Tung Chee-hwa
2	Arthur Leong Siu-chung, GBS 梁紹中 (1936–2010; aged 74)	1 January 2001	13 July 2003	2 years and 194 days	City Law School	District Judge (1982–91); Judge of the High Court of Justice (1991–97); Justice of Appeal of the Court of Appeal (1997–2000)	Retired		Tung Chee-hwa
3	Geoffrey Ma Tao-li, GBM 馬道立 (born 1956; age 70)	14 July 2003	31 August 2010	7 years and 49 days	University of Birmingham (LLB); University of Law	Recorder of the Court of First Instance (2000–01); Judge of the Court of First Instance (2001–02); Justice of Appeal of the Court of Appeal (2002–03)	Appointed as 2nd Chief Justice of the Court of Final Appeal (retired)	QC (1993)	Tung Chee-hwa
4	Andrew Cheung Kui-nung, GBM 張舉能 (born 1961; age 64)	20 June 2011	24 October 2018	7 years and 127 days	University of Hong Kong (LLB, PCLL); Harvard Law School (LLM)	District Judge (2001–03); Deputy High Court Judge (2001–03); Judge of the Court of First Instance (2003–11)	Appointed as Permanent Judge of the Court of Final Appeal (Later appointed 3rd Chief Justice of the Court of Final Appeal)		Donald Tsang
5	Jeremy Poon Shiu-chor 潘兆初 (born 1962; age 64)	18 December 2019	Incumbent	6 years and 264 days	University of Hong Kong (LLB, PCLL); University College London (LLM)	Permanent Magistrate (1993–99); Deputy Registrar of the High Court (1999–2006); Judge of the Court of First Instance (2006–15); Justice of Appeal of the Court of Appeal (2015–19)			Carrie Lam

For pre-1997 Chief Justices (equivalent to the present day Chief Judge of the High Court), see Chief Justice of the Supreme Court of Hong Kong

== See also ==
- Vice-Presidents of the Court of Appeal of Hong Kong
- High Court of Hong Kong
- Court of Appeal of Hong Kong
- Court of First Instance of Hong Kong
- Court of Final Appeal (Hong Kong)
- Chief Justice of the Court of Final Appeal of Hong Kong
- Legal system of Hong Kong
