= Andrew Cheung =

Hong Kong judge (born 1961)

The Honourable Chief Justice Andrew Cheung Kui-nung GBM
- 張舉能
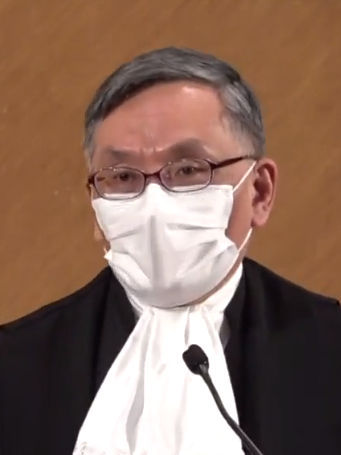
- Cheung on 11 January 2021

3rd Chief Justice of the Court of Final Appeal of Hong Kong
- Incumbent
- Assumed office 11 January 2021
- Appointed by: Carrie Lam
- Preceded by: Geoffrey Ma

Designated National Security Law Judge
- Incumbent
- Assumed office 2020
- Appointed by: Carrie Lam

Permanent Judge of the Court of Final Appeal
- In office 25 October 2018 – 11 January 2021
- Appointed by: Carrie Lam
- Preceded by: Robert Tang

4th Chief Judge of the High Court
- In office 20 June 2011 – 24 October 2018
- Appointed by: Donald Tsang
- Preceded by: Geoffrey Ma
- Succeeded by: Jeremy Poon

Judge of the Court of First Instance of the High Court
- In office 2003–2011

Deputy High Court Judge
- In office 2001–2003

Judge of the District Court
- In office 2001–2003

Personal details
- Born: 24 September 1961 (age 65) British Hong Kong
- Education: University of Hong Kong; Harvard Law School (LLM)
- Occupation: Judge
- Profession: Barrister

Andrew Cheung
- Traditional Chinese: 張舉能
- Simplified Chinese: 张举能
Transcriptions
Standard Mandarin
- Hanyu Pinyin: Zhāng Jǔnéng
Yue: Cantonese
- Jyutping: Zoeng1 Geoi2 Nang4

Andrew Cheung Kui-nung GBM (Chinese: 張舉能; born 24 September 1961) is a Hong Kong judge who serves as the 3rd Chief Justice of the Court of Final Appeal. He previously served as a Permanent Judge of the same court. He was the 4th and longest-serving Chief Judge of the High Court.

== Early life ==
Born in Hong Kong on 24 September 1961, Cheung attended Ying Wa College, before reading law at the University of Hong Kong and taking a Master of Laws degree at Harvard Law School in the United States. Cheung served briefly as a Lecturer and Demonstrator of the Faculty of Law of the University of Hong Kong on a part-time basis after graduation.

== Legal career ==
=== The Bar: 1985–2001 ===
Cheung was called to the Hong Kong Bar in 1985 as a pupil of Audrey Eu and began private practice the following year in the chambers of Henry Litton. His practice mainly involved civil and commercial cases. In 1995, he was admitted as an advocate and solicitor of the Supreme Court of Singapore.

=== The bench: 2001– ===
Cheung was appointed to the bench in 2001 as a judge of the District Court of Hong Kong. Sitting first as a Deputy High Court Judge in December 2001, he was soon elevated to the Court of First Instance of the High Court in 2003. He was then appointed as the Probate Judge in 2004, before becoming the Judge in charge of the Constitutional and Administrative Law List of the High Court in 2008. His tenure was marked by a number of high-profile rulings relating to constitutional and human rights matters.

In June 2011, Cheung succeeded Geoffrey Ma as the Chief Judge of the High Court and President of the Court of Appeal, making him the fourth local judge to hold this position. In his speech to the Legislative Council moving the resolution to endorse Cheung's appointment, the Chief Secretary for Administration, Mr. Henry Tang, described Cheung as an outstanding lawyer with the ability to handle difficult and complex cases and the potential of being a good administrator of the High Court.

He was elected an Honorary Bencher of Lincoln's Inn in 2017.

On 21 March 2018, the Judiciary announced his appointment as a Permanent Judge of the Court of Final Appeal with effect from 25 October 2018, succeeding Robert Tang. Cheung's appointment was accompanied by the appointments of Baroness Hale and Beverley McLachlin as Non-Permanent Judges of the city's top court. He held the office of Chief Judge of the High Court for 7 years, 127 days – the longest serving of the four judges who had served in the role.

Cheung is a member of the Judicial Officers Recommendation Commission, which makes recommendations to the Chief Executive on judicial appointments. He is a member of the Law Reform Commission and also chairs or is a member of various committees and working parties within the Judiciary.

Cheung was announced as the 3rd Chief Justice of the Court of Final Appeal on 24 March 2020, succeeding Geoffrey Ma. His appointment took effect on 11 January 2021. He is the first local law graduate to be appointed Hong Kong's Chief Justice.

In May 2023, the Congressional-Executive Commission on China (CECC) of the United States Congress suggested the United States government imposing sanctions on Cheung to counter the erosion of democratic freedoms in Hong Kong over his handling of Jimmy Lai's national security law case.

Legal offices
Preceded by Geoffrey Ma	Chief Judge of the High Court; 2011–2018	Succeeded by Jeremy Poon Shiu-chor
Preceded by Robert Tang	Permanent Judge of the Court of Final Appeal; 2018–2021; Served alongside: Robert Ribeiro, Joseph Fok	Succeeded by Johnson Lam
New creation	Designated National Security Law Judge; 2020–Present	Incumbent
Preceded by Geoffrey Ma	Chief Justice of the Court of Final Appeal; 2021–Present	Incumbent
Order of precedence
Preceded by John Lee; Chief Executive of Hong Kong	Hong Kong order of precedence Chief Justice of the Court of Final Appeal	Succeeded by Donald Tsang; Former Chief Executives
