= Yang Ti-liang =

Hong Kong judge (1929–2023)

The Honourable Dato Seri Paduka Sir Ti-liang Yang GBM

Life Member of the Court of HKU
- In office 18 December 2001 – 24 June 2023 Serving with Sir Yuet-Keung Kan, Dr. Rayson Huang and Dr. Victor Fung

Chief Justice of Hong Kong
- In office 1988–1996
- Preceded by: Sir Denys Roberts
- Succeeded by: Sir Noel Power (acting)

Unofficial Member of the Executive Council
- In office 1997–2002
- Chief Executive: Tung Chee-Hwa
- Convenor: Sir Sze-Yuen Chung; Leung Chun-ying

Personal details
- Born: 30 June 1929 Shanghai, China
- Died: 24 June 2023 (aged 93) Hong Kong
- Spouse(s): Tam Oi-lin (aka Eileen Barbara Tam; died 24 June 2006)
- Children: 2
- Education: Soochow University Law School, Shanghai; LLB (University College, London)
- Honorary Degree: Hon LLD (CUHK); Hon DLitt (HKU); Hon LLD (PolyU)

Yang Ti-liang
- Traditional Chinese: 楊鐵樑
- Simplified Chinese: 杨铁梁
Transcriptions
Standard Mandarin
- Hanyu Pinyin: Yáng Tiěliáng
Yue: Cantonese
- Jyutping: joeng4 tit3 loeng4

Sir Ti-liang Yang, GBM (Chinese: 楊鐵樑; 30 June 1929 – 24 June 2023) was a Hong Kong jurist. He was the Chief Justice of Hong Kong from 1988 to 1996, the only ethnic Chinese person to hold this office during British colonial rule.

Yang was a candidate in the 1996 Hong Kong Chief Executive election, where he lost to his opponent Tung Chee-Hwa. After the transfer of sovereignty over Hong Kong, he was appointed a non-official member of the Executive Council by Tung and retired in 2002. In retirement, he mainly focused on writing and teaching English. In September 2003, he became the host of a RTHK radio programme, Yang Ti-liang Mail Box (楊鐵樑留言信箱), teaching English grammar. Yang died on 24 June 2023, at the age of 93.

== Early life ==
Yang was born in Shanghai on 30 June 1929. He attended St. John's Middle School (same foundation as St. John's University) in his early years and read law in the Comparative Law School of China in Soochow University Law School in Shanghai from 1946 to 1949. Due to the Chinese Civil War, he moved very briefly to Hong Kong before graduating, where he stayed at St. John's Hall in 1949. Then he moved to England to read law at University College London, where he graduated with an LLB with honours in 1953. In 1954, he was called to the bar with honours at Gray's Inn. After studying in England, Yang returned to Hong Kong in 1955.

== Judicial career ==
In June 1956, Yang was offered a post as magistrate, which he accepted, and, in 1963, he was promoted to senior magistrate. Yang was acting District Judge from 1964 to 1968. During that period, he was chairman of the Kowloon Disturbances Claims Assessment Board and following the 1967 Leftist Riots, he also presided over the Compensation Board. In 1968, he was appointed District Judge of the Victoria District Court and was made a member of the Chinese Language Committee and president of the Legal Sub-Committee in 1970. Yang was, for a brief period in 1971, acting Puisne Judge.

In 1972, he was appointed Commissioner of Inquiry into the Rainstorm Disasters. On 17 February 1975, he presided over the watershed corruption trial of Peter Fitzroy Godber, a former Kowloon Deputy District Commissioner of the Royal Hong Kong Police Force. Yang sentenced him to four years' imprisonment after a six-day trial. That same year, Yang was promoted to Judge of the High Court of Justice of the Supreme Court of Hong Kong. In 1976, he chaired the Commission of Inquiry into the Leung Wing-sang case in which a station sergeant, Lau Cheong-wah, allegedly induced Leung with HK$10,000 to confess to wounding another person. In 1980, Yang was chairman of the Commission of Inquiry into the apparent suicide of Inspector John MacLennan.

Yang was appointed a Justice of Appeal in 1981 and, six years later, Vice-President. In March 1988, Yang was appointed Chief Justice of Hong Kong (the then chief judge of the Court of Appeal) following recommendation of the Governor Sir David Wilson. This was the first time an ethnic Chinese had held this office. Prior to the appointment, he also received a knighthood from Queen Elizabeth II in the 1988 New Year Honours List. According to customary practice, the Chief Justices of Hong Kong would also become Chief Justice of Brunei Darussalam. Yang's predecessor, however, Sir Denys Tudor Emil Roberts, continued to serve as Chief Justice of Brunei Darussalam after his retirement. Sir TL was instead appointed president of the Court of Appeal of Brunei on 24 May 1988.

== Chief Executive election ==
In 1996, Yang tendered his resignation to then governor Chris Patten in order to clear the way for his candidacy in the first ever Chief Executive election. In addition, he renounced his British citizenship and wrote a letter to Queen Elizabeth II to give up his knighthood. Before the election, he organised a series of campaigns, including visiting public housing estates, and travelled on the Mass Transit Railway subway system for the first time in his life. On 11 December 1996, the small-circle Election Committee selected Tung Chee Hwa, a shipping magnate, over Yang to be Chief Executive. The vote was 320 to 42.

Yang was appointed a Non-Official Member of the Executive Council by Tung soon after the establishment of the Hong Kong Special Administrative Region. During his tenure in the Council, he was chairman of the Exchange Fund Investment Ltd from 1998 to 2002 and was responsible to the management of the Tracker Fund of Hong Kong. From 1999 to 2004, he was also chairman of the Independent Commission Against Corruption Complaints Committee.

== Public service ==
From 1981 to 1984, Yang was chairman of the University and Polytechnic Grants Committee. From 1985 to 2001, he was chairman of the University of Hong Kong Council. He was also Pro-Chancellor of the University of Hong Kong from 1994 to 2001. In 2000, during his Pro-Chancellorship, he was designated by the university to investigate the Public Opinion Programme Disputes.

In 1988, he was elected an Honorary Bencher of Gray's Inn. He served as President of the Bentham Club at University College London in 1991. From 1998 to 2012, he was chairman of the Hong Kong Red Cross; in June 2012, he assumed the honorary position of President.

After retiring from the Executive Council in 2002, Yang spent much of his time teaching English grammar and etiquette. In September 2003, he hosted a Radio Television Hong Kong radio programme, Yang Ti-liang Mail Box (楊鐵樑留言信箱), teaching English grammar and answering questions on his website. He was honorary professor of Chinese at the University of Hong Kong from 1998. In 2005, he was appointed honorary professor and chairman of the Executive Committee of the School of Law by the Chinese University of Hong Kong. In 2006, he was made honorary professor of Social Sciences at the Open University of Hong Kong.

== Translated works ==
Yang translated Chinese classics into English, including:

- General Yue Fei, 1995 (《說岳全傳》)
- The Peach Blossom Fan, 1998 (《桃花扇》) - It is a translation of the 1948 novelisation by Gu Sifan into English
- Officialdom Unmasked, 2001 (《官場現形記》)

== Honours ==
He was knighted in 1988. He was appointed a Justice of Peace from 1 July 1998 to 2012. On 15 July 1990, he was awarded the Order of Seri Paduka Mahkota Brunei First Class by Sultan Hassanal Bolkiah. He was awarded the Grand Bauhinia Medal by the Government of Hong Kong Special Administrative Region in 1999 to acknowledge his contribution to justice and higher education in Hong Kong.

=== Honorary degrees ===
- Hon. LLD, Chinese University of Hong Kong, 1984
- Hon. DLitt, University of Hong Kong, 1991
- Hon. LLD, Hong Kong Polytechnic, 1992

=== Fellows ===
- University College London, 1989
- Chartered Institute of Arbitrators, 1990

== See also ==
- Chief Justice of the Supreme Court of Hong Kong
- Tung Chee Hwa

== Additional sources ==
=== English materials ===
- Former Chief Justice warns not to let language deteriorate, Pensioners' Corner, Civil Service Newsletter Editorial Board, retrieved on 1 September
- The Hon. Sir Ti Liang Yang, GBM, JP Curriculum Vitae, Hong Kong Red Cross, 2005
- Information Paper for the Joint Meeting of the Panel on Security and Panel on Health Services to be held on 29 April 2003, Hong Kong Legislative Council, retrieved on 1 September 2007
- HISTORY, Supreme Court of Brunei Darussalam, retrieved on 1 September 2007
- American Journal of Sociology, Vol. 116, No. 3 (Nov 2010) pp. 1046–1052 by Barbara Celarent

=== Chinese materials ===
- 得失之間 楊鐵樑, 壹週刊時事專訪, 7 August 2003
- 楊鐵樑簡介, 楊鐵樑留言信箱, RTHK, retrieved on 1 September 2007
- Taigu Jituan Zaijiu Zhongguo Shanghai Renmin Chuban She 1991

Academic offices
Preceded by Sir Albert Maria Rodrigues	Chairman of the Council of the University of Hong Kong; 1985–2001	Succeeded by Dr Victor Fung
Legal offices
Preceded by Sir Denys Roberts	Chief Justice of the Supreme Court of Hong Kong; 1988–1996	Succeeded by Sir Noel Power; Acting
