= Judicial Officers Recommendation Commission =

- 司法人員推薦委員會

Commission overview
- Formed: 20 February 1976
- Preceding commission: Judicial Service Commission
- Type: Statutory body
- Jurisdiction: Hong Kong
- Commission executives: Andrew Cheung, Chairman; Esther Leung, Secretary

Judicial Officers Recommendation Commission
- Traditional Chinese: 司法人員推薦委員會
- Simplified Chinese: 司法人员推荐委员会
Transcriptions
Standard Mandarin
- Hanyu Pinyin: Sīfǎrényuán Tuījiàn Wěiyuánhuì
Yue: Cantonese
- Jyutping: si1 faat3 jan4 jyun4 teoi1 zin3 wai2 jyun4 wui6*2

The Judicial Officers Recommendation Commission (JORC, Chinese: 司法人員推薦委員會) is a statutory body in Hong Kong responsible for advising and making recommendations to the Chief Executive on judicial appointments and related matters established after the Handover in accordance with the Judicial Officers Recommendation Commission Ordinance (Cap. 92). According to Article 88 of the Basic Law, the Chief Executive shall appoint judges on the recommendation of the Commission, suggesting that he or she is not empowered to make appointments on his or her own accord.

== History ==
The commission was established in 1976 as the Judicial Service Commission by the Judicial Service Commission Ordinance 1975. The Commission originally consisted of 6 members, which included the Chief Justice, the Attorney General, the Chairman of the Public Service Commission, and not more than three members appointed by the Governor, one of whom may be a judge of the Supreme Court. The current composition was adopted via an amendment to the Ordinance in 1990.

The commission was renamed to its current name in 1997.

== Composition ==
The Commission is chaired by the Chief Justice of the Court of Final Appeal ex-officio and is composed of the Secretary for Justice ex-officio and 7 other members appointed by the Chief Executive. These include:

- three judges,
- one barrister (typically recommended by the Hong Kong Bar Association),
- one solicitor (typically recommended by the Law Society of Hong Kong),
- one secretary, and
- three other persons not connected with the practice of law.

Members are appointed by the Chief Executive and serve renewable two-year terms. Resolutions of the Commission are effective upon a quorum of 7 members, of which at least two less than the number present must vote in favour. No member has veto power.

The Judiciary Administrator is ex officio the secretary to the Commission.

== Current members ==
As of 2023, the following are the members of the Commission:

- The Hon Mr Justice Andrew Cheung Kui-nung, Chairperson ex-officio as Chief Justice of the Court of Final Appeal
- The Hon Paul Lam SC, ex-officio as Secretary for Justice
- The Hon Mr Justice Jeremy Poon Shiu-chor, Chief Judge of the High Court
- The Hon Madam Justice Carlye Chu Fun-ling, Vice President of the Court of Appeal
- Victor Dawes SC, Former Chairman of the Hong Kong Bar Association
- Melissa Kaye Pang, Former President of the Law Society
- Anita Fung Yuen-mei, former Chief Executive of the Hongkong and Shanghai Banking Corporation
- Pamela Chan Wong-shui, former Chief Executive of the Hong Kong Consumer Council
- Liu Pak-wai, Professor of Economics at the Chinese University of Hong Kong

== See also ==
- Judicial Appointments Commission
