= Supreme Court of Hong Kong =

Former high court of Hong Kong

- Traditional Chinese: 香港最高法院
Transcriptions
Yue: Cantonese
- Yale Romanization: Hēung góng jeui gōu faat yuhn
- Jyutping: Hoeng1 gong2 zeoi3 gou1 faat3 jyun6

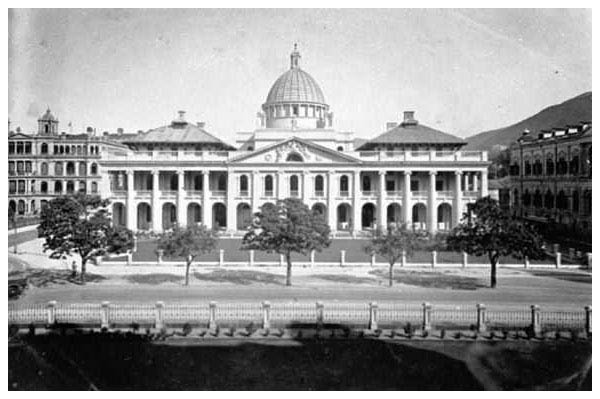
The "old Supreme Court Building" facing Statue Square in 1915.

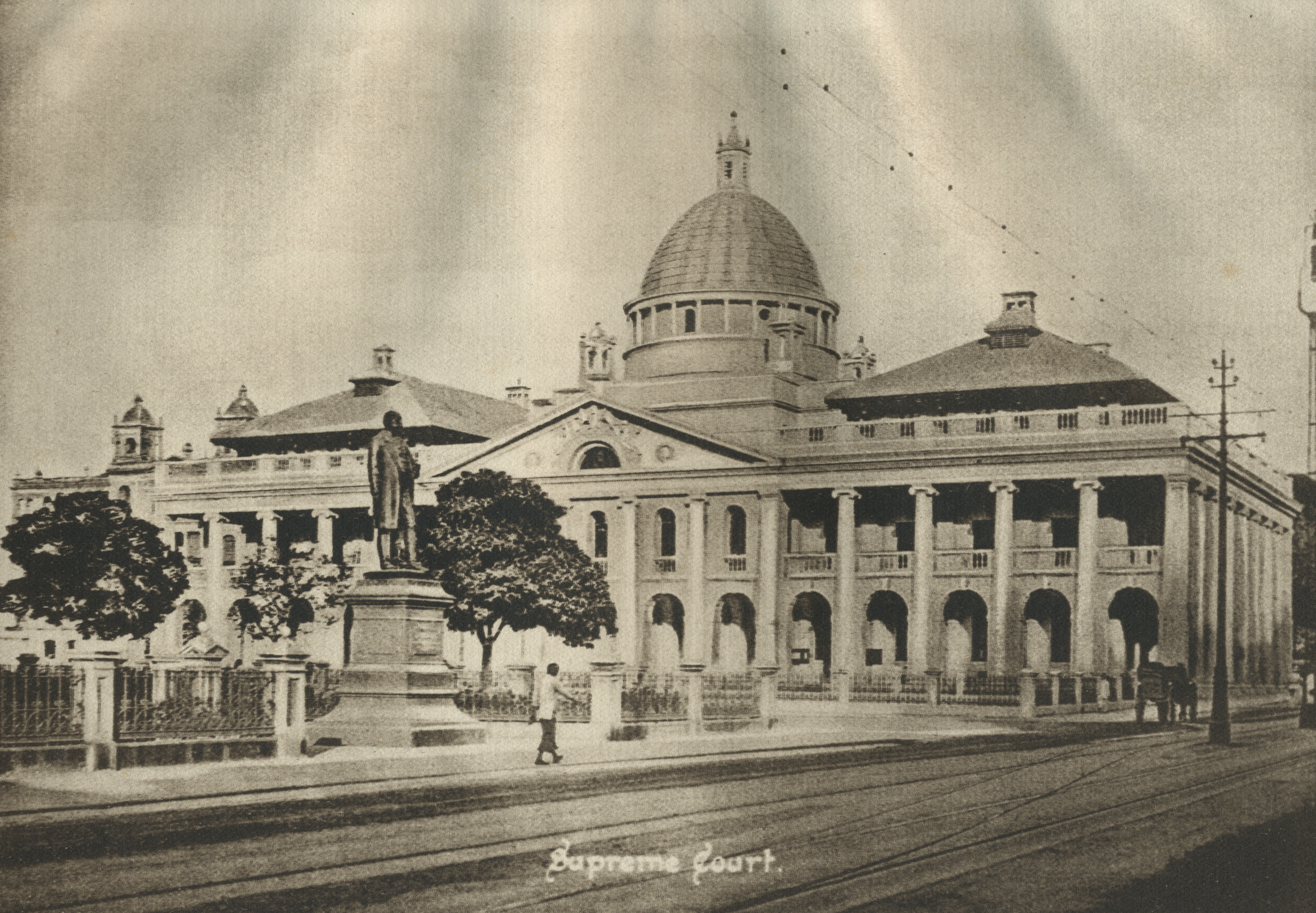
The old Supreme Court Building, viewed from Des Voeux Road Central. The statue of Sir Thomas Jackson is visible in the foreground.

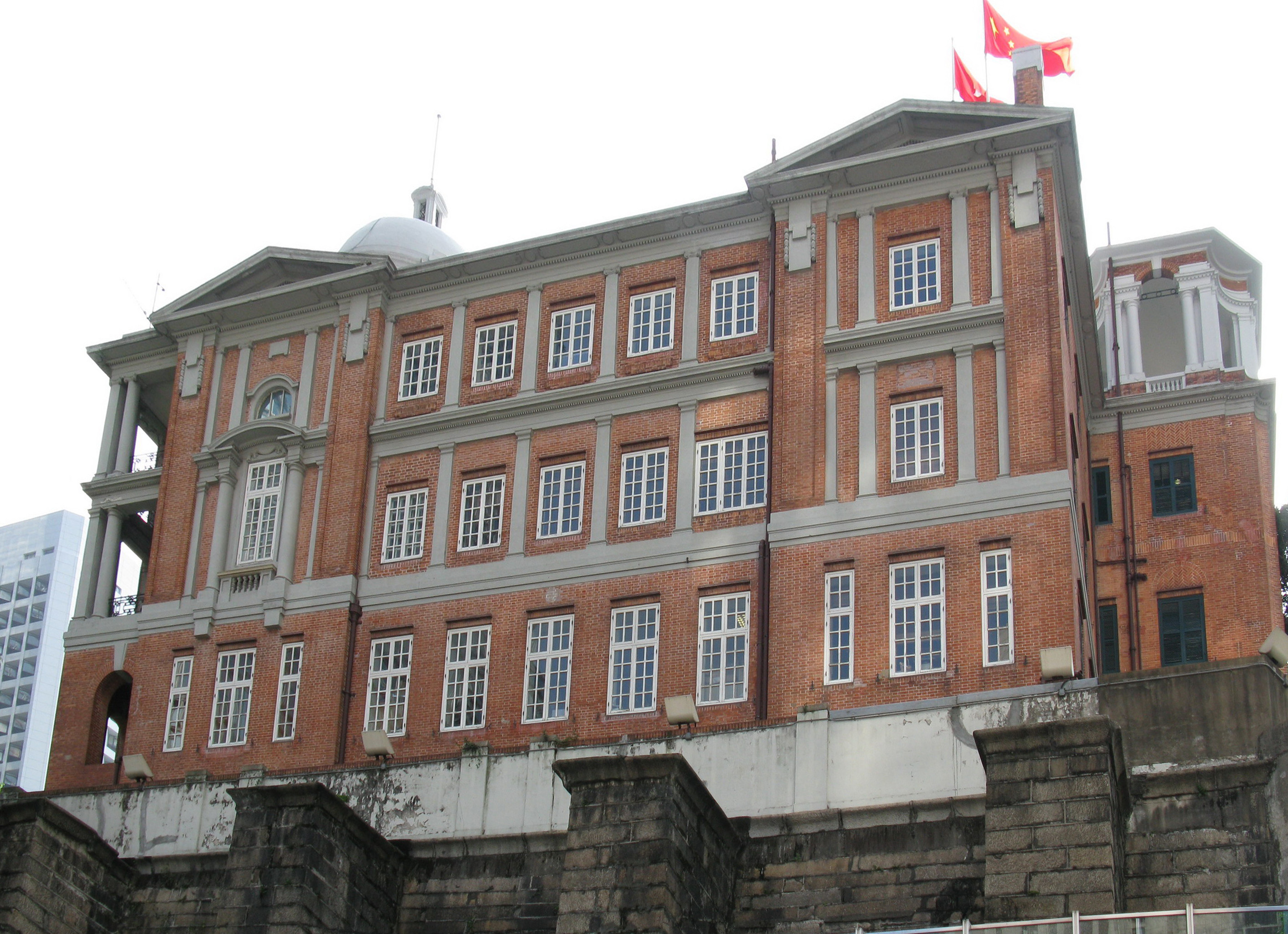
Former French Mission Building, used by the Supreme Court from 1980 to 1983 and later by the Court of Final Appeal from 1997 to 2015.

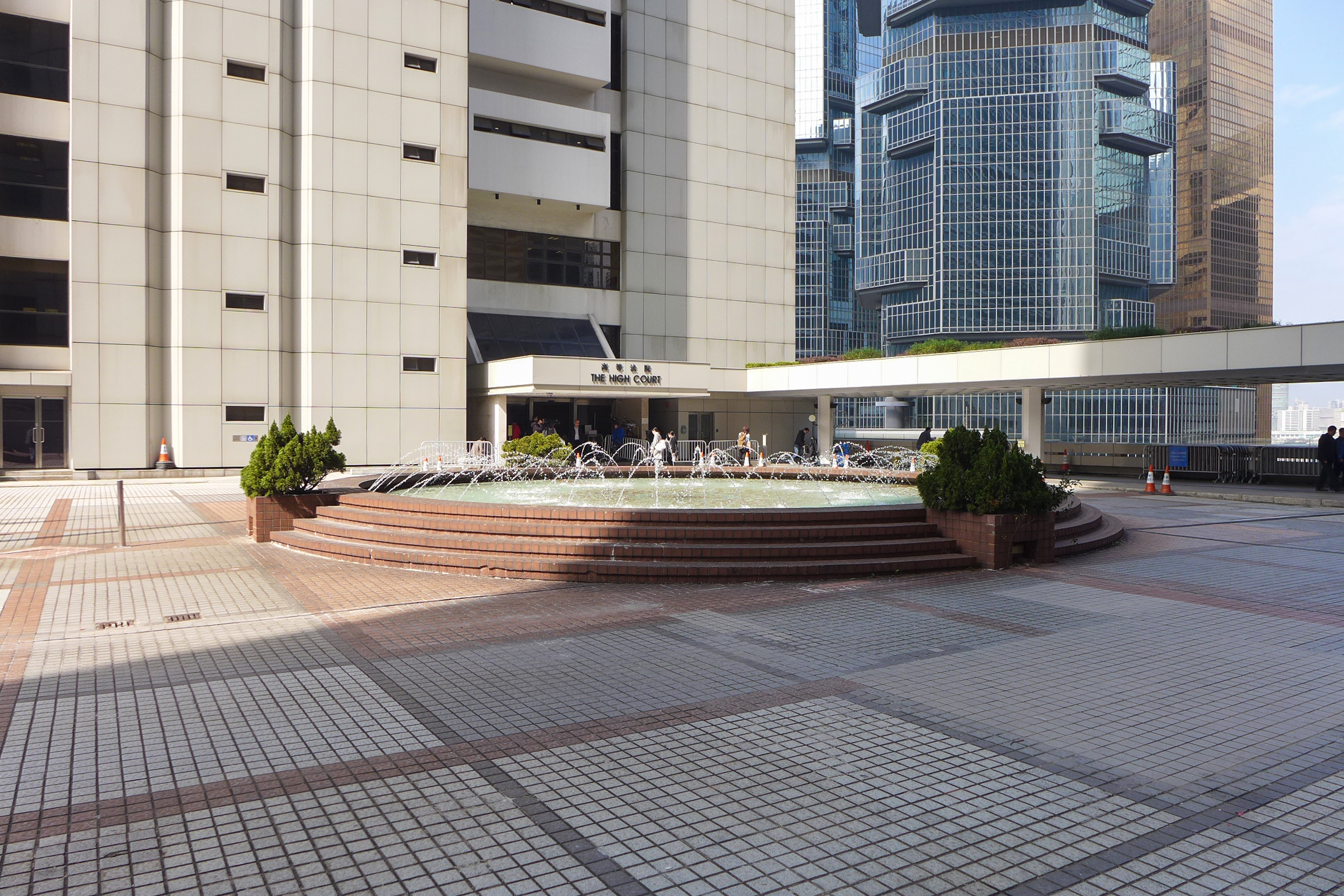
Entrance of the High Court in Admiralty.

The Supreme Court of Hong Kong (HKSC) was a court that existed from 1844 to 1997 in British Hong Kong. It was a superior court of record and heard cases of first instance and appeals from the District Court and Magistracies, as well as certain tribunals. Despite its name, the Supreme Court was not the highest court in Hong Kong as the Judicial Committee of the Privy Council served as the highest appellate court, acting similarly to that of the Senior Courts of England and Wales. The Supreme Court was from 1976 made up of the High Court of Justice and the Court of Appeal following a restructure of the court.

Following the handover on 1 July 1997, the Supreme Court became the High Court of Hong Kong, which is made up of the Court of First Instance and the Court of Appeal. The road it is on and has been named after, the Supreme Court Road, is however still named as such.

== History ==
=== Establishment ===
The Supreme Court was established in 1844 after Hong Kong became a British Crown colony under the Treaty of Nanjing. The first sitting of the court was on 1 October 1844 presided over by the first Chief Justice, John Walter Hulme.

=== Renaming on transfer of sovereignty ===
Following the transfer of sovereignty, the Supreme Court was renamed as the High Court, which the High Court of Justice of the former Supreme Court was renamed the Court of First Instance. Appeals from the Court of Appeal (and where there is such a direct appeal, the Court of First Instance) are now heard by the Hong Kong Court of Final Appeal, which was established on 1 July 1997 replacing the Judicial Committee of the Privy Council that has acted as the court of final adjudication.

== Appeals ==
For almost 70 years after establishment of the court, there was no Court of Appeal in Hong Kong. Appeals were either by way of re-hearing or made directly to the Judicial Committee of the Privy Council. From 1913, appeals were heard by a Full Court made up of 3 judges. From 1913 to 1943, a judge of the British Supreme Court for China in Shanghai was eligible to sit on the Full Court. In the 1910s and 1920s, a Shanghai judge would regularly travel to Hong Kong to sit on the Full Court. Sir Havilland de Sausmarez, a judge of the Shanghai court, was the President of the Full Court from 1910 to 1920. From 1926 to 1941, a judge of the Hong Kong Supreme Court also sat on the full court of the British Supreme Court for China.

The Court of Appeal was established in 1976. Appeals from the Court of Appeal and Full Court and, certain criminal appeals from the High Court, lay to the Judicial Committee of the Privy Council in the United Kingdom. In order to appeal to the Privy Council, leave to appeal was required either from the court appealed from or the Privy Council.

== Buildings ==
- 1844–1848: A building at the junction of Wyndham and Wellington Streets
- 1848–?: Exchange Building, 7 Queen's Road, Central, a building originally erected for Dent & Co. by Tam Achoy.
- 1889–1911: No. 29 Queen's Road, Central, between the Post Office and Land Office
- 1912–1980: The old Supreme Court Building – until 2012, the Legislative Council Building at 8 Jackson Road, Central, Hong Kong Island. It became the new seat of the Hong Kong Court of Final Appeal in September 2015.
- 1980–1983: The Former French Mission Building, later home to the Court of Final Appeal (1997–2015)
- 1985–1997: The new Supreme Court Building – now the High Court Building at 38 Queensway, Admiralty, Hong Kong Island

== See also ==
- Judiciary of Hong Kong
- Chief Justice of the Supreme Court of Hong Kong
- Maurice Heenan
- Sir Ti-Liang Yang
- Sir Denys Roberts
- Sir Noel Power
- Sir George Phillippo
- Sir Havilland de Sausmarez
