= Patrick Chan (judge) =

Hong Kong judge

The Honourable Mr Justice Patrick Chan GBM
- 陳兆愷

Non-Permanent Judge of the Court of Final Appeal
- Incumbent
- Assumed office 2013

Permanent Judge of the Court of Final Appeal
- In office 2000 – 21 October 2013
- Appointed by: Tung Chee Hwa
- Preceded by: Henry Litton
- Succeeded by: Joseph Fok

Designated National Security Law Judge
- Incumbent
- Assumed office 2021
- Appointed by: Carrie Lam

1st Chief Judge of the High Court of Hong Kong
- In office 1997–2000

Judge of the Court of First Instance of the High Court
- In office 1992–1997

District Court
- In office 1987–1991

Personal details
- Born: 21 October 1948 (age 77) Hong Kong
- Education: University of Hong Kong

Patrick Chan Siu-oi GBM (traditional Chinese: 陳兆愷; simplified Chinese: 陈兆恺; Sidney Lau: Chan^{4} Siu^{6} Hui^{2}) is a judge in Hong Kong. He currently serves as a Non-Permanent Judge of the Court of Final Appeal having previously been a Permanent Judge of that court.

== Early life, education and legal career ==
Born in Hong Kong, Chan attended Wah Yan College, Hong Kong, a prominent Jesuit high school in Hong Kong. He received his Bachelor of Laws ("LLB") degree in 1974 and a Postgraduate Certificate in Laws in 1975 from the University of Hong Kong. He served pupillage under Patrick Yu and was called to the Hong Kong Bar in 1976. He was a barrister in private practice until he joined the Judiciary as a District Judge in 1987.

== Judicial career ==
Between 1987 and 1991, Chan served as judge in District Courts, having been appointed a District Judge on 9 November 1987. In 1991, he was appointed Deputy Registrar of the Supreme Court. In 1992, he began serving as a Judge in the Court of First Instance of the High Court of Hong Kong.

Chan was appointed the first Chief Judge of the High Court in 1997, when British colonial rule in Hong Kong ended and China resumed its sovereignty over the region. He thus became the first locally educated judge to hold that position.

In 2000, he was appointed a Permanent Judge of the Court of Final Appeal (Hong Kong's court of last resort). He retired in 2013 and was succeeded by Joseph Fok. He continues to serve as a Non-Permanent Judge of the Court.

During his time on the bench, Chan contributed significantly towards the development of a bilingual legal system, and served on various judicial committees advocating the greater use of Chinese in judicial proceedings and the translation of English judgments.

In February 2021, Chan claimed that there is no absolute separation of powers in Hong Kong, and that "It is more accurate to call it a division of authority."

In May 2023, the Congressional-Executive Commission on China (CECC) of the United States Congress suggested the United States government imposing sanctions on Chan to counter the erosion of democratic freedoms in Hong Kong over his handling of Jimmy Lai's national security law case.

== Extra-judicial Life ==
From October 2006 to September 2012, Chan was a member of the Law Reform Commission of Hong Kong.

Chan was appointed an Honorary Bencher of the Inner Temple (England and Wales) in 2001. He was conferred Honorary Fellowships by the University of Hong Kong (2003) and the Chinese University of Hong Kong (2011). He was conferred with an Honorary Doctor of Laws degree by the City University of Hong Kong (2008) and an Honorary Doctor of Laws degree by the University of Hong Kong (2011).

In 2013, Chan was awarded the Grand Bauhinia Medal, the highest honour given by the HKSAR Government.

Chan has been recognised for his contributions to legal education in Hong Kong. He was the Chairman of the Joint Examination Board on Postgraduate Certificate in Laws set up to ensure that a common standard would be maintained for postgraduate law students of both the University of Hong Kong and the City University entering the legal profession.

Legal offices
Preceded by Noel Power as Chief Justice of the Supreme Court of Hong Kong; Acting	Chief Judge of the High Court; 1997–2000	Succeeded by Arthur Leong
Preceded by Henry Litton	Permanent Judge of the Court of Final Appeal; 2000–2013; With: Kemal Bokhary (2000–2012); Robert Ribeiro (2000–2013); Robert Tang (2012–2013)	Succeeded by Joseph Fok
New creation	Designated National Security Law Judge; 2021–Present	Incumbent
Order of precedence
Preceded by Kemal Bokhary; Non-Permanent Judge of the Court of Final Appeal	Hong Kong order of precedence Non-Permanent Judge of the Court of Final Appeal	Succeeded by Lord Hoffmann; Non-Permanent Judge of the Court of Final Appeal
