= Johnson Lam =

Hong Kong judge

The Honourable Mr Justice Johnson Lam Man-hon PJ
- 林文瀚

Permanent Judge of the Court of Final Appeal
- Incumbent
- Assumed office 30 July 2021

Designated National Security Law Judge
- Incumbent
- Assumed office 2021
- Appointed by: Carrie Lam

Vice-President of the Court of Appeal of the High Court
- In office 2 September 2013 – 29 July 2021

Justice of Appeal of the Court of Appeal of the High Court
- In office 16 August 2012 – 1 September 2013

President of the Lands Tribunal
- In office 1 December 2003 – 31 December 2009
- Preceded by: David Yam
- Succeeded by: Thomas Au

Judge of the Court of First Instance of the High Court
- In office 22 August 2003 – 15 August 2012

District Judge
- In office 17 April 2001 – 21 August 2003

Personal details
- Born: 1961 (age 64–65) Hong Kong
- Education: University of Hong Kong

Johnson Lam Man-hon (Chinese: 林文瀚) is a Permanent Judge of the Hong Kong Court of Final Appeal.

== Biography ==
=== Early life and education ===
Lam was born in Hong Kong in 1961. He obtained an LL.B. and P.C.LL. from the University of Hong Kong in 1983 and 1984 respectively. Among his graduating class was his future judicial colleague Andrew Cheung.

=== Legal career ===
Lam was called to the Bar in Hong Kong in 1984 and was in private practice since 1985.

Lam joined the Judiciary as District Judge in 2001.

Lam was appointed as Judge of the Court of First Instance of the High Court in 2003. He served as President of the Lands Tribunal from 2003 to 2009. In 2011, he was appointed as the Judge in charge of the Constitutional and Administrative Law List.

In 2012, Lam was elevated to the Court of Appeal. He continued to serve as Judge in charge of the Constitutional and Administrative Law List until he was appointed as Vice President of the Court of Appeal on 2 September 2013.

He is currently Chairman of the Judiciary's Working Party on Mediation, as well as a member of the Steering Committee on Mediation and the Accreditation Sub-committee set up by the Secretary for Justice.

On 12 May 2021, it was announced that the Chief Executive had accepted the recommendation of the independent Judicial Officers Recommendation Commission to appoint Lam as a Permanent Judge of the Court of Final Appeal (a post which had become vacant upon the appointment of Andrew Cheung as Chief Justice of the Court of Final Appeal on 11 January 2021), subject to the endorsement of the Legislative Council in accordance with Article 90 of the Basic Law. Lam's appointment took effect on 30 July 2021.

Lam was appointed by the Chief Executive as a member of the Law Reform Commission of Hong Kong for 3 years with effect from 1 September 2021.

In May 2023, the Congressional-Executive Commission on China (CECC) of the United States Congress suggested the United States government imposing sanctions on Lam to counter the erosion of democratic freedoms in Hong Kong over his handling of Jimmy Lai's national security law.

Legal offices
New creation	Designated National Security Law Judge; 2021–Present	Incumbent
