= Chief Justice of the Court of Final Appeal =

Head of the Hong Kong judiciary

Chief Justice of the Hong Kong Court of Final Appeal
- 香港終審法院首席法官
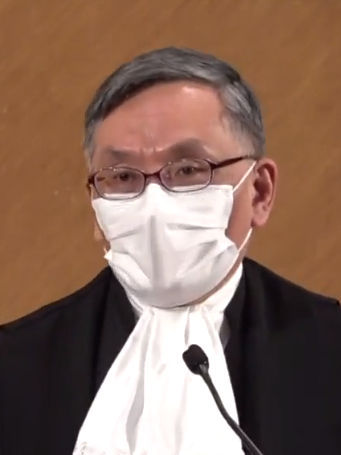
- Incumbent; Andrew Cheung since 11 January 2021
- Style: The Honourable (尊貴的) (formal)
- Nominator: Chief Executive
- Appointer: Legislative Council
- Term length: Tenure until the age of 70 (Note: Term may be extended by 3-year periods for up to two terms, meaning retirement age could be 76)
- Constituting instrument: Hong Kong Basic Law
- Inaugural holder: Andrew Li
- Formation: 1 July 1997; 29 years ago

Chief Justice of the Court of Final Appeal
- Traditional Chinese: 香港終審法院首席法官
Transcriptions
Yue: Cantonese
- Yale Romanization: Hēung góng jūng sám faat
- Jyutping: Hoeng^{1} gong^{2} zung^{1} sam^{2} faat^{3} jyun^{6} sau^{2} zik^{6} faat^{3} gun^{1}

The chief justice of the Hong Kong Court of Final Appeal, sometimes informally known as the chief justice of Hong Kong, is the head of the Judiciary of Hong Kong and the president of the Court of Final Appeal. The chief justice is one of four permanent members of the Court. During British rule between 1843 and 1997, the head of the Hong Kong Judiciary was the chief justice of the Supreme Court of Hong Kong; that position became the chief judge of the High Court in 1997.

The chief justice is appointed by the chief executive on the recommendation of the Judicial Officers Recommendation Commission, subject to the endorsement of the Legislative Council.

The first chief justice of the Hong Kong Court of Final Appeal was Andrew Li, who served for over 13 years.

== Role of the chief justice ==
The chief justice is the president of the Court of Final Appeal, and is charged with the administration of the Judiciary and often acts as its spokesperson. He is assisted by the court leaders of the lower courts for judicial administration (such as dealing with staffing, promotions, or public complaints), namely the chief judge of the High Court, chief district judge, and the chief magistrate. In hearing and determining an appeal, the Court will consist of five judges, with the chief justice sitting at the middle of the bench. However, the chief justice enjoys no higher authority than other permanent or non-permanent judges of the court when it comes to judicial decisions.

The office of chief justice is second only to the chief executive of Hong Kong in the Hong Kong order of precedence. In the case of an impeachment of a chief executive of Hong Kong, the chief justice presides over the trial as provided by the Hong Kong Basic Law. The chief justice is also the chairman ex-officio of the Judicial Officers Recommendation Commission which makes recommendations to fill a variety of judicial roles, and also determines the elevation of junior barristers to senior counsel status.

== List ==
No.	Name	Place of birth	Starting age	Retirement age	Term of office		Tenure length	Prior judicial offices	Higher education	Inner bar	Appointed by
1	Andrew Li Kwok-nang, GBM 李國能 (born 1948; age 77)	Hong Kong	48	61	1 July 1997	31 August 2010	13 years and 62 days	Deputy District Judge (1982–85); Deputy High Court Judge (1991–97)	University of Cambridge (MA, LLM)	QC (1988)	Tung Chee-hwa
2	Geoffrey Ma Tao-li, GBM 馬道立 (born 1956; age 70)	Hong Kong	54	65	1 September 2010	10 January 2021	10 years and 132 days	Recorder of the Court of First Instance (2000–01); Judge of the Court of First Instance (2001–02); Justice of Appeal of the Court of Appeal (2002–03); Chief Judge of the High Court (2003–10)	University of Birmingham (LLB); University of Law	QC (1993)	Donald Tsang
3	Andrew Cheung Kui-nung, GBM 張舉能 (born 1961; age 64)	Hong Kong	59	Incumbent	11 January 2021	Incumbent	5 years and 240 days	District Judge (2001–03); Deputy High Court Judge (2001–03); Judge of the Court of First Instance (2003–11); Chief Judge of the High Court (2011–18); Permanent Judge of the Court of Final Appeal (2018–21)	University of Hong Kong (LLB, PCLL); Harvard Law School (LLM)		Carrie Lam

== Residence ==
The chief justice resides at the Chief Justice's House, also known as the Clavadel, at 18 Gough Hill Road, The Peak. It was built in 1893. The chief justice is also chauffeured in a government vehicle with the license plate "CJ".

== Judiciary administrator ==
Attached to the office of the chief justice is a Judiciary administrator, who assists the chief justice in the overall administration of the Judiciary. Being the head of the Judiciary Administration, they have to ensure that proper support is provided to judges and judicial officers in the administration of justice, and that court operation is being carried out effectively and smoothly.

#	Name	Term of office		Tenure length	Appointed by
1	Alice Tai Yuen-ying, GBS, JP	1 July 1997	31 March 1999	1 year and 274 days	Andrew Li
2	Wilfred Tsui Chi-keung	15 June 1999	14 June 2005	6 years and 0 days	Andrew Li
3	Emma Lau Yin-wah, JP	15 June 2005	16 July 2020	15 years and 32 days	Andrew Li
4	Esther Leung Yuet-yin, JP	20 July 2020	Incumbent	6 years and 50 days	Geoffrey Ma

== See also ==
- Hong Kong Court of Final Appeal
- Permanent Judges of the Court of Final Appeal
- Chief Judge of the High Court of Hong Kong
- Chief Justice of the Supreme Court of Hong Kong
- Legal system of Hong Kong
