= Court of Appeal of the High Court =

Second highest court in Hong Kong

Coordinates: 22°16′41.38″N 114°9′47.23″E

- 香港特別行政區高等法院上訟法庭
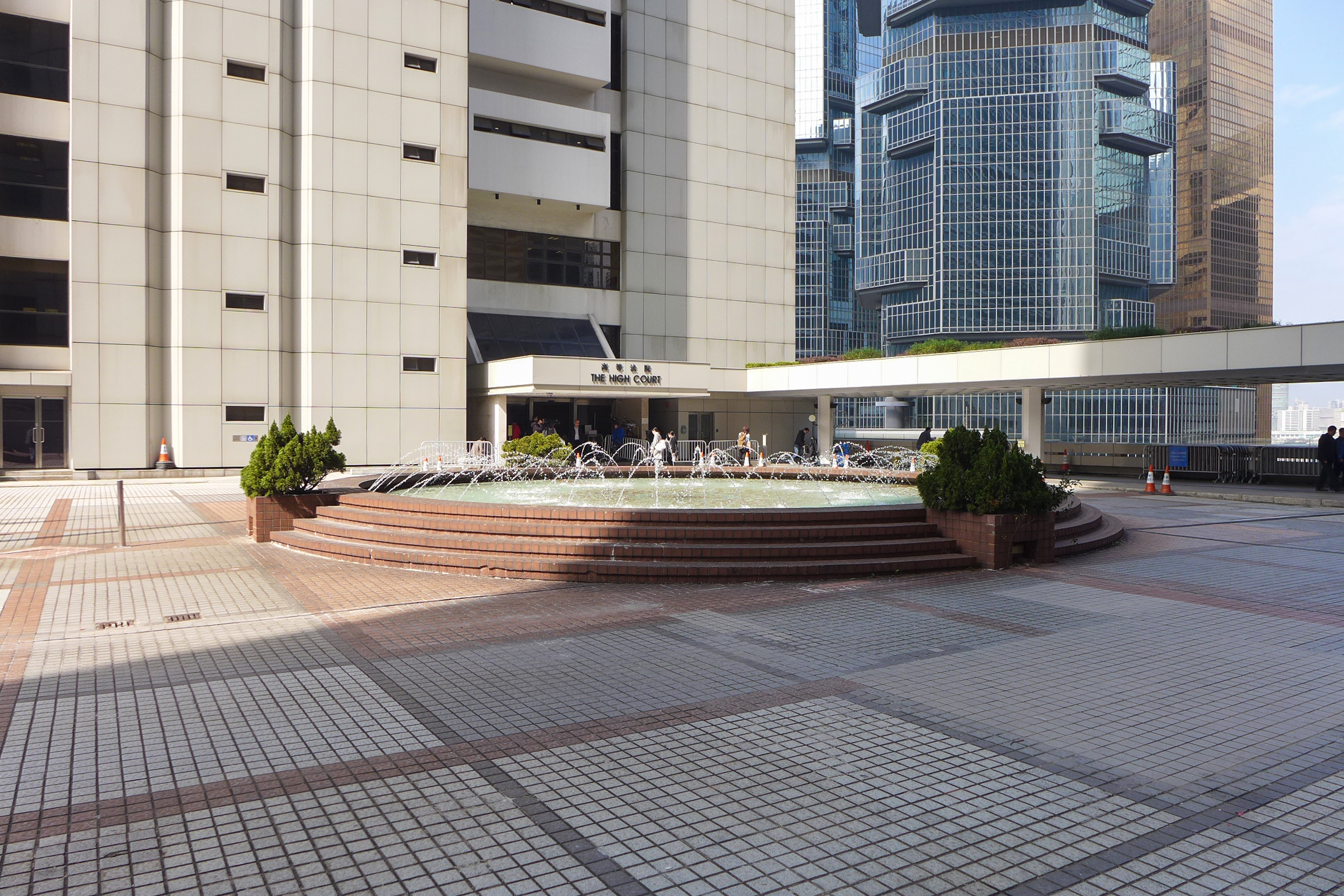
- Entrance of the High Court
- Established: 20 February 1976
- Jurisdiction: Hong Kong
- Location: 38 Queensway, Admiralty, Hong Kong
- Composition method: Appointment by the Chief Executive on the recommendation of the Judicial Officers Recommendation Commission
- Authorised by: Hong Kong Basic Law; High Court Ordinance (Cap. 4)
- Appeals to: Court of Final Appeal
- Appeals from: Court of First Instance; District Court; Lands Tribunal
- Number of positions: 13
- Website: judiciary.hk

President of the Court of Appeal
- Currently: The Honourable Mr Justice Jeremy Poon Shiu-chor, CJHC
- Since: 18 December 2019

Court of Appeal of the High Court
- Traditional Chinese: 上訴法庭
- Simplified Chinese: 上诉法庭
Transcriptions
Standard Mandarin
- Hanyu Pinyin: Shàngsùfǎtíng
Yue: Cantonese
- Yale Romanization: Séuhng sou faat tìhng
- Jyutping: Soeng5 sou3 faat3 ting4

The Court of Appeal of the High Court (HKCA in case citations; CA in action numbers) is the upper court of the High Court of Hong Kong (the lower court being Court of First Instance). The Court of Appeal is the second most senior court in the Hong Kong judiciary, after the Court of Final Appeal.

The hierarchy of the Hong Kong judiciary from high to low is: the Court of Final Appeal, the High Court (consisting of the upper Court of Appeal and the lower Court of First Instance), the District Court, and magistrates' courts.

The Court of Appeal deals with appeals on all civil and criminal cases from the Court of First Instance and the District Court. Criminal appeals from the magistrates' Courts of great general or public importance may also be heard by the Court of Appeal, either by referral by a single judge from the Court of First Instance, or upon granting of leave on application for review by the Secretary for Justice. This court also hears appeals from the Lands Tribunal and various tribunals and statutory bodies. The Court of Appeal was established in 1976, and its president is the Chief Judge of the High Court.

Decisions of the Court of Appeal are binding on all courts and tribunals in Hong Kong, including itself, except for the Court of Final Appeal. The Court of Appeal however has the power to depart from its own decisions if they find them to be "plainly wrong".

== History ==
=== Before 1976 ===
Before the establishment of the Court of Appeal, appeals were either by way of re-hearing or made directly to the Judicial Committee of the Privy Council. From 1913, appeals were heard by a Full Court made up of 3 judges. From 1913 to 1943, a judge of the British Supreme Court for China in Shanghai was eligible to sit on the Full Court. In the 1910s and 1920s, a Shanghai judge would regularly travel to Hong Kong to sit on the Full Court. Sir Havilland de Sausmarez, a judge of the Shanghai court, was the President of the Full Court from 1910 to 1920. From 1926 to 1941, a judge of the Hong Kong Supreme Court also sat on the full court of the British Supreme Court for China.

=== 1976: establishment of the Court of Appeal ===
The Court of Appeal was created in 1976 by the Supreme Court Ordinance 1975 as part of the then Supreme Court. Appeals from the Court of Appeal lay to the Judicial Committee of the Privy Council in London. In order to appeal to the Privy Council, leave to appeal was required either from the court appealed from or the Privy Council.

The court sat for the first time on the morning of 20 February 1976, with Wilfred Pickering and Alan Huggins serving as the first justices of appeal.

=== 1997 - present ===
The Court of Appeal continued operating as part of the renamed High Court of Hong Kong upon the transfer of sovereignty on 1 July 1997, as provided for in Article 81 of the Basic Law. The Privy Council ceased to hear appeals from Hong Kong, and its role as Hong Kong's final appellate court was assumed by the new Court of Final Appeal, to which all appeals from the Court of Appeal now lie.

== Divisions ==
The Court of Appeal consists of three divisions, each presided over by a vice-president of the court of appeal. These include a criminal division, a civil division, and a "mixed" division that deals with both criminal and civil cases.

== Judges ==
The Chief Judge of the High Court of Hong Kong serves as the President of the Court of Appeal. Prior to 1997, the position was known as the Chief Justice, and its holder was the most senior judge in Hong Kong.

Prior to the establishment of the Court of Appeal in 1976, a Full Court consisting of first instance High Court judges was constituted to hear appeals.

Cases in the Court of Appeal are decided by a bench consisting of one, two or three Justices of Appeal. On rare occasions, having regard to the public importance of the issue, the Court of Appeal has been constituted by a division of five judges. Final substantive appeal hearings take place before a bench of three Judges. In civil cases, interlocutory appeals and leave to appeal application hearings take place before a bench of two Judges. A single Judge can grant leave to appeal on a paper application and make procedural orders/directions not involving the determination of an appeal. In criminal cases, appeals against sentence take place before a bench of two Judges and leave to appeal application hearings take place before a single Judge. A decision by a two-member bench of the Court of Appeal has the same binding precedential value as a decision by a three-member bench of the Court of Appeal or a five-member bench of the Court of Appeal. If a case is heard by a two-member bench and the two Judges differ on the outcome, then the lower court's judgment or order will not be disturbed. In such a situation, any party can apply for the case to be re-heard by an uneven number of Judges in the Court of Appeal.

A Judge of the Court of First Instance may also sit as a Judge in the Court of Appeal, including as a single Judge (for example, when determining applications for leave to appeal in criminal cases).

== Significant cases ==
In August 2022, the court ruled that same-sex marriages overseas would not be recognized as valid in Hong Kong, resulting in no rights or benefits given to married couples in Hong Kong.

In November 2022, the court ruled that there are minimum jail sentences for "serious" national security offenses.

== List of justices of appeal (since 1997) ==
#	Name	Tenure	Reason for tenure end	Silk	Ref
1	Gerald Michael Godfrey	1997–2000	Became Vice President of the Court of Appeal	QC (1971)	
2	Michael Stuart-Moore, GBS	1997–1999	Became Vice President of the Court of Appeal	QC (1990)	
3	Anthony Gordon Rogers, GBS	1997–2000	Became Vice President of the Court of Appeal	QC (1984)	
4	Arthur Leong Siu-chung, GBS	1997–2000	Became Chief Judge of the High Court		
5	Simon Herbert Mayo, GBS	1997–2000	Became Vice President of the Court of Appeal		
6	Sir Brian Richard Keith	1999–2001	Retired	QC (1989)	
7	Michael Wong Kin-chow, GBS	1999–2001	Retired		
8	Woo Kwok-hing, GBS	2000–2004	Became Vice President of the Court of Appeal	QC (1987)	
9	Roberto Alexandre Vieira Ribeiro, GBM	2000	Became Permanent Judge of the Court of Final Appeal	QC (1990)	
10	Doreen Maria Le Pichon, GBS	2000–2011	Retired		
11	Frank Stock, GBS	2000–2009	Became Vice President of the Court of Appeal	QC (1985)	
12	Peter Cheung Chak-yau	2001–			
13	Wally Yeung Chun-kuen, GBS	2002–2011	Became Vice President of the Court of Appeal		
14	Maria Candace Yuen Ka-ning	2002–2023	Retired		
15	Geoffrey Ma Tao-li, GBM	2002–2003	Became Chief Judge of the High Court	QC (1993)	
16	Robert Tang Kwok-ching, GBM, SBS	2005–2006	Became Vice President of the Court of Appeal	QC (1986)	
17	Michael John Hartmann, GBS	2008–2012	Retired (Non-permanent Judge of the Hong Kong Court of Final Appeal)		
18	Susan Kwan Shuk-hing	2009–2019	Became Vice President of the Court of Appeal		
19	Joseph Paul Fok	2011–2013	Became Permanent Judge of the Court of Final Appeal	SC (1999)	
20	Carlye Chu Fun-ling	2011–2022	Became Vice President of the Court of Appeal		
21	Michael Victor Lunn, GBS	2011–2014	Became Vice President of the Court of Appeal	QC (1994)	
22	Johnson Lam Man-hon	2012–2013	Became Vice President of the Court of Appeal		
23	Aarif Tyebjee Barma	2012–		SC (2002)	
24	Andrew Colin Macrae	2013–2018	Became Vice President of the Court of Appeal	SC (1999)	
25	Ian Charles McWalters, GBS	2014–2021	Retired	SC (2005)	
26	Derek Pang Wai-cheong	2015–			
27	Jeremy Poon Shiu-chor	2015–2019	Became Chief Judge of the High Court		
28	Kevin Paul Zervos	2018–		SC (2003)	
29	Thomas Au Hing-cheung	2019–			
30	Maggie Poon Man-kay, GBS	2021–2025	Retired		
31	Godfrey Lam Wan-ho	2021–		SC (2008)	
32	Anderson Chow Ka-ming	2021–		SC (2004)	
33	Anthea Pang Po-kam, GBS	2021–2025	Retired		
34	Anthony Chan Kin-keung	2025–		SC (2003)	
35	Keith Yeung Kar-hung	2026–		SC (2009)	
36	Russell Adam Coleman	2026–		SC (2006)	
37	Alex Lee Wan-tang	2026–			

== See also ==
- Vice Presidents of the Court of Appeal of Hong Kong
- High Court of Hong Kong
- Judiciary of Hong Kong
- Appellate court
