= Hong Kong electoral reform =

Hong Kong electoral reform may refer to:

- 1985 Hong Kong electoral reform
- 1988 Hong Kong electoral reform
- 1994 Hong Kong electoral reform
- 2010 Hong Kong electoral reform
- 2014–15 Hong Kong electoral reform
- 2021 Hong Kong electoral reform
