= 1988 Hong Kong electoral reform =

The 1988 Hong Kong electoral reform was carried out by the colonial government during 1987 to 1988 as the second stage of the developments of the representative government. Direct elections to the Legislative Council became the most debated issue during the public consultations. Under the strong opposition from the Government of the People's Republic of China, the Hong Kong government consequently turned down the option of the 1988 direct elections and introduced a little change in the government system.

== Background ==
The reform consultations followed the 1985 electoral reform which introduced the first ever indirect elections to the Legislative Council of Hong Kong in the 1985 Legislative Council Election. In the White Paper: the Further Development of Representative Government in Hong Kong, the idea of direct election was suggested to be reviewed in the development of representative government in 1987.

In May 1987, the government published the 1987 Green Paper: Review of Developments in Representative Government to consider the next stage of development of representative government, which could take account into the terms of the Sino-British Joint Declaration signed in December 1984 which the United Kingdom and People's Republic of China governments agreed upon the handover of Hong Kong to the PRC in 1997.

== Green Paper ==
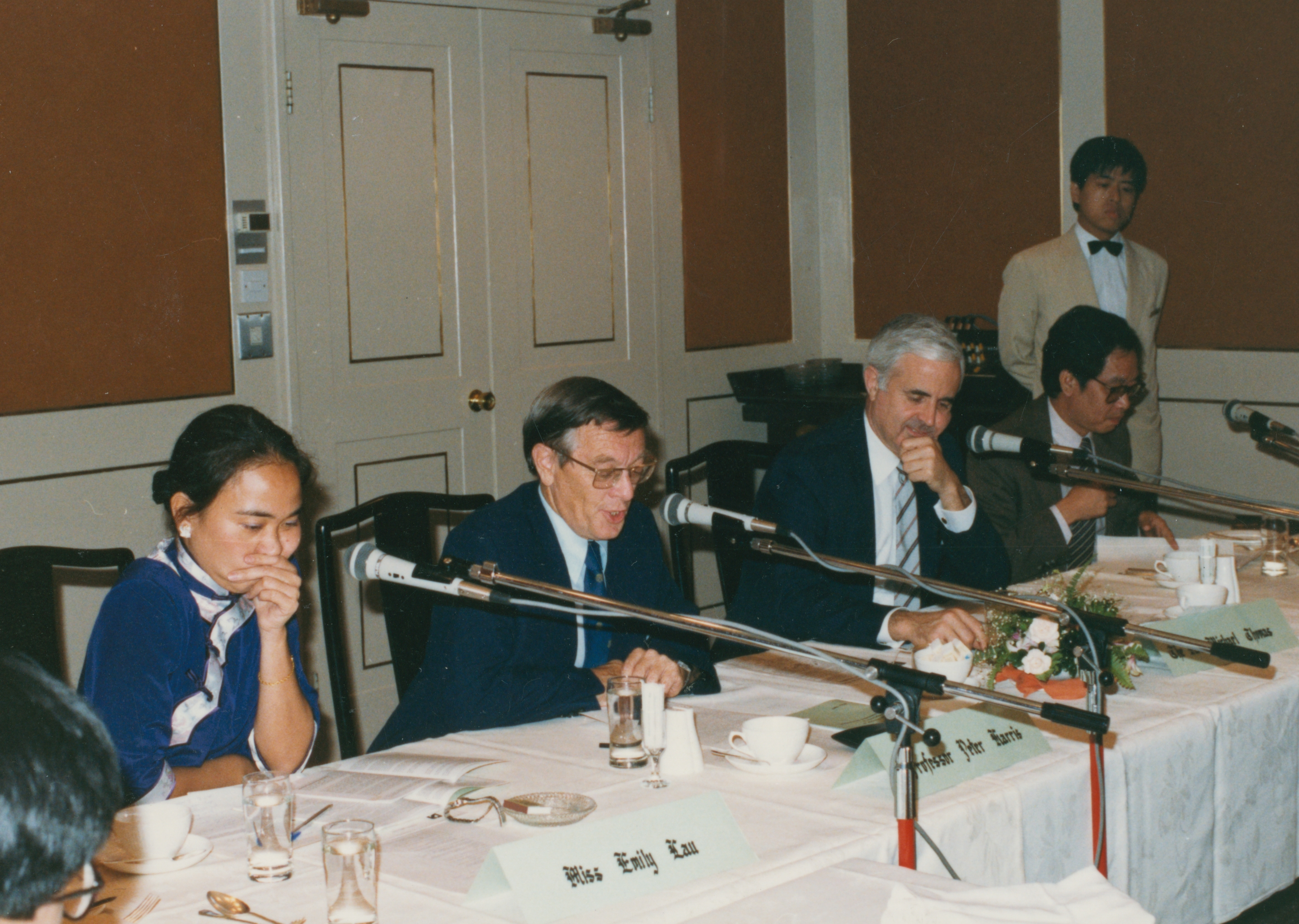
A forum on the 1987 Green Paper, attended by Emily Lau as a member of the press, Professor Peter Harris, Michael Thomas and Stephen Cheong, member of the Legislative Council.

The 1987 Green Paper: Review of Developments in Representative Government provided a general review on the development of the representative government system at district, regional and central levels, assessment of the developments since the publication of the 1984 White Paper and the public response to them, and consideration of the options for further development in 1988.

The Green Paper listed the following as options of introducing a representative government for public consultation:

- changing the composition, functions and elections of the District Boards, and the municipal councils (Urban Council and Regional Council) and Legislative Council;
- considering whether the Governor should continue to be the President of the Legislative Council; and
- introducing direct elections to the Legislative Council in 1988.

== Public consultation ==
The period of public consultation started from 27 May, the day the Green Paper was published, until 30 September 1987.

=== Pro-Beijing opinions ===
The PRC authorities strongly opposed the idea of direction elections to the Legislative Council. On 18 June 1987, the news department of the New China News Agency Hong Kong branch distributed a summary of an interview with Li Hou, deputy director of the Hong Kong and Macao Affairs Office of the State Council of the People's Republic of China and the secretary general of the Basic Law Drafting Committee. In the interview Li Hou claimed that Hong Kong direct elections in 1988 fail to "converge" with the Hong Kong Basic Law which was being drafted at that time and were contrary to the "spirit" of the Sino-British Joint Declaration. Li said direct elections in 1988 would only sharpen the contradictions among different classes and segments of Hong Kong society, which would lead to political, economic, and social instability and would be harmful to a smooth transfer of sovereignty in 1997. However, after a private meeting between Hong Kong Governor David Wilson and PRC Foreign Minister Wu Xueqian on 20 June 1987, Li clarified that he never said the 1988 direct elections did not conform the spirit of Sino-British Joint Declaration.

During the summer and fall of 1989, the local pro-Beijing organs and figures such as the Chinese General Chamber of Commerce joined forces with conservative business elites to actively oppose the introduction of direct election, which they argued would only undermine Hong Kong's stability and prosperity. Some unionists from the leftist Hong Kong Federation of Trade Unions (FTU) even coined the slogan that "Hong Kong workers only want their meal tickets but not ballot tickets." It was also reported that the Bank of China arranged for its employees to watch a video narrated by Ma Lik, who was the then deputy secretary general of the Hong Kong Basic Law Consultative Committee, explaining why the introduction of direct elections was a British conspiracy. The Bank of China also prepared a printed pro-forma opposing letter for its employees to sign and send to the Survey Office.

Consequently, the pro-Beijing supporters mobilised 60,706 written submissions to the Hong Kong government objecting the 1988 direct elections, in which 50,175 came on cyclostyled forms and 22,722 were from the communist-controlled FTU.

=== Pro-democracy opinions ===
The pro-democracy activists, as well as pressure groups and local academic critics criticised Li Hou's statement represented PRC officials intimidating against Hong Kong people, direct interfering with the internal administration of Hong Kong, and violating the Sino-British Joint Declaration which stated that the British were responsible for the administration of Hong Kong until 1997 and the post-1997 Hong Kong SAR legislature should be constituted by elections.

The largest pro-democracy alignment, the Joint Committee on the Promotion of Democratic Government which was formed in October 1986 bring together 190 organisations, launched series of campaign for the 1988 direct elections including the collection of 220,000 signatures with names and identity card numbers. This behaviour of Hong Kong public was considered "a significant development in a society which traditionally avoided personal identification with a particular course of political action."

=== Public opinions ===
A longitudinal survey was conducted at four points in 1987. General endorsement of public endorsement of direct elections in 1988 was measured at 54 percent, 54 percent, 49 percent and 46 percent in the four phases, which double the percentage of people who disagreed with direct election, 16 percent, 17 percent, 23 percent and 21 percent. The decline in popular support for the direct elections were due to the opposition from the PRC government, the business sector and the pro-Beijing organisations such as the FTU.

During the four-month period of public consultation, over 134,000 submissions were sent to the Survey Office, as well as in nearly 170 public opinion surveys and over 20 signature campaigns. Among the submissions, nearly 96 percent commenting on the issue of direct elections.

== White Paper ==
In February 1988, the Hong Kong government published the White Paper: the Development of Representative Government: The Way Forward which stressed "prudent and gradual change." The Report did not distinguish between pre-printed forms and individual submissions and compressed the 220,000 signatures collected by the democrats as one single count. The official line was there was a strong public desire for further development of government, but there was no clear consensus timing or the extent of the introduction of direct elections.

The White Paper promised elections to successive tiers of Government, with elections of one representative from each District Board to the Municipal Councils, and elections of one representative each from the Urban Council and Regional Council to LegCo. Successive, staggered elections of District Boards, Municipal Councils and Legislative Council were held in order within twelve months from 1988 to 1989 for the purpose that terms of offices of different groups of Legislative Councillors not be staggered.

=== Legislative Council ===
The White Paper promised that at least 10 of the 56 members of the Legislative Council would be directly elected in the 1991 Legislative Council Election in single-seat constituencies. In conjunction, the 10 geographically based electoral college would be abolished, while Urban and Regional Council constituencies would be retained.

In the interim, two more functional constituencies, Accountancy and Health Care enlarged from Financial and Medical respectively, were suggested to be added in the 1988 Elections for the accountancy professions and nurses, midwives, pharmacists and five paramedical professions. The preferential elimination system of voting was also favoured to be adopted in both the electoral college and functional constituency elections to the Legislative Council. The number of appointed members was recommended to reduce from 22 to 20.

=== Municipal Councils ===
The size of the Urban Council would be increased from 30 to 40 members in the 1989 elections. The composition of 15 appointed and 15 directly elected members remains unchanged, with 10 new members from the District Boards. The composition of the Regional Council remained the same.

Terms of Municipal Councils were extended with interim terms from April 1989 to Mar 1991 to for accommodate sets of elections in 1991 and 1995, concurrent with Legislative Council election cycles.

=== District Boards ===
No changes were made to the composition of District Boards. The overall ratio of elected to appointed members remain 2:1.

=== Future Reform ===
To response to the Beijing government, it also acknowledge the need for a "convergence" between Hong Kong internal developments before 1997 and the future Basic Law. Governor David Wilson recalled events thus:

...it was convenient for us [the British], in terms of handling the transition with China, that we did not have...overwhelming pressure form people in Hong Kong to move straight away into direct elections because we knew that doing that would be very difficult for the Chinese to accept.

The democrats criticised the Hong Kong government of manipulating the submissions to turn down the 1988 direct elections in order to please Beijing.

=== Legislative Council motion ===
In March 1988, Chief Secretary Sir David Robert Ford moved the motion regarding the White Paper, the members of the Legislative Council ferociously debated on the issue and were divided by their views on the White Paper.

Support:

- Lydia Dunn
- Ho Kam-fai
- Allen Lee
- Hu Fa-kuang
- Wong Po-yan
- Stephen Cheong
- Cheung Yan-lung (support '88 direct election)
- Selina Chow
- Maria Tam
- Henrietta Ip
- Chan Ying-lun (support '88 direct election)
- Rita Fan
- Pauline Ng
- Peter Poon
- Yeung Po-kwan
- Kim Cham
- Cheng Hon-kwan
- Helmut Sohmen
- Tam Yiu-chung
- Chiu Hin-kwong
- Chung Pui-lam
- Thomas Clydesdale
- Ho Sai-chu
- Richard Lai (support '88 direct election)
- Liu Lit-for
- Ngai Shiu-kit
- Poon Chi-fai
- Poon Chung-kwong
- Rosanna Tam
- Daniel Tse
- Andrew Wong
- Lau Wong-fat
- Edward Ho

Oppose:

- Hui Yin-fat
- Conrad Lam
- Martin Lee
- Desmond Lee
- Pang Chun-hoi
- Szeto Wah

Neutral:

- Chan Kam-chuen (walkout in protest)
- Jackie Chan (support '88 direct election)
- Hilton Cheong-Leen (support '88 direct election)
- Tai Chin-wah

No opinion:

- David Li

Absent:

- Peter C. Wong
- John Joseph Swaine

== Aftermath ==
The 1988 Legislative Council Elections in September remained the indirect elections of 12 members from the electoral colleges and 14 members from the functional constituencies with two new seats of Accountancy and Health constituencies.

As promised in the White Paper, the first ever direct elections was introduced in the 1991 Legislative Council Elections. The Tiananmen Square Massacre in 1989 which sparked the great fear among the Hong Kong public also paved the way for a faster pace of the democratic reform in 1994.

== See also ==
- Democratic development in Hong Kong
- 1985 Hong Kong electoral reform
- 1988 Hong Kong legislative election
