= Legal (constituency) =

Hong Kong functional constituency

Legal 法律界
- Functional constituency for the Legislative Council of Hong Kong
- Region: Hong Kong
- Electorate: 6,328

Current constituency
- Created: 1985
- Number of members: One
- Member: Nicholas Chan (Liberal)

The Legal functional constituency (Chinese: 法律界功能界別) is a functional constituency in the elections for the Legislative Council of Hong Kong. It was one of the 12 original functional constituency seats created for the first ever Legislative Council election in 1985.

As of 2021, there were 7,549 registered voters, including the members of the Law Society of Hong Kong and the Hong Kong Bar Association, and the officers in the government's judicial departments. It was one of the few strongholds of the pro-democracy camp in functional constituencies, having been held by pro-democrats since 1995, was held by Civic Party's Dennis Kwok until he was disqualified from his office in 2020. Following electoral overhaul, the seat was controlled by the pro-Beijing camp for the first time.

== Composition ==
The Legal functional constituency is composed of—

- members of The Law Society of Hong Kong entitled to vote at general meetings of the Society; and
- members of the Hong Kong Bar Association entitled to vote at general meetings of the Association; and
- legal officers within the meaning of the Legal Officers Ordinance (Cap. 87); and
- persons appointed under section 3 of the Legal Aid Ordinance (Cap. 91; and
- persons deemed to be legal officers for the purpose of the Legal Officers Ordinance (Cap. 87) by section 75(3) of the Bankruptcy Ordinance (Cap. 6) or section 3(3) of the Director of Intellectual Property (Establishment) Ordinance (Cap. 412); and
- the Legal Adviser of the Legislative Council Secretariat and his or her assistants who are in the full-time employment of The Legislative Council Commission and are barristers or solicitors as defined in the Legal Practitioners Ordinance (Cap. 159).

== Return members ==
| Election | Member | Party |
|---|---|---|
| 1985 | Martin Lee | Independent |
| 1988 | Martin Lee | Independent |
| 1991 | Simon Ip | Independent |
| 1995 | Margaret Ng | Independent |
Not represented in the PLC (1997–1998)
| 1998 | Margaret Ng | Independent |
| 2000 | Margaret Ng | Independent |
| 2004 | Margaret Ng | Independent→Civic |
| 2008 | Margaret Ng | Civic |
| 2012 | Dennis Kwok | Civic |
| 2016 | Dennis Kwok | Civic |
| 2021 | Ambrose Lam | Independent |
| 2025 | Nicholas Chan | Liberal |

== Electoral results ==
=== 2020s ===
2025 Legislative Council election: Legal
| Party | Candidate | Votes | % | ±% |
|---|---|---|---|---|
| Liberal | Nicholas Chan Hiu-fung | 1,543 | 67.20 | |
| Independent | Virginia Lee Wing-cheung | 753 | 32.80 | |
| Majority | | 790 | 34.4 | |
| Total valid votes | | 2,296 | 100.00 | |
| Rejected ballots | | 122 | 5.05 | |
| Turnout | | 2,418 | 38.21 | |
| Registered electors | | 6,328 | | |
| Liberal gain from Independent | | Swing | | |

2021 Legislative Council election: Legal
| Party | Candidate | Votes | % | ±% |
|---|---|---|---|---|
| Independent | Ambrose Lam San-keung | 1,637 | 70.84 | |
| Independent | Chen Xiaofeng | 674 | 29.16 | |
| Majority | | 963 | 41.68 | |
| Total valid votes | | 2,311 | 100.00 | |
| Rejected ballots | | 225 | | |
| Turnout | | 2,536 | 33.59 | |
| Registered electors | | 7,549 | | |
| Independent gain from Civic | | Swing | | |

=== 2010s ===
2016 Legislative Council election: Legal
| Party | Candidate | Votes | % | ±% |
|---|---|---|---|---|
| Civic | Dennis Kwok Wing-hang | 3,405 | 69.48 | +13.28 |
| Independent | Catherine Mun Lee-ming | 1,496 | 30.52 | |
| Majority | | 1,909 | 38.96 | +26.61 |
| Total valid votes | | 4,901 | 100.00 | |
| Rejected ballots | | 129 | | |
| Turnout | | 5,030 | 74.27 | +2.84 |
| Registered electors | | 6,773 | | |
| Civic hold | | Swing | | |

2012 Legislative Council election: Legal
| Party | Candidate | Votes | % | ±% |
|---|---|---|---|---|
| Civic | Dennis Kwok Wing-hang | 2,528 | 56.20 | –9.54 |
| Independent | Albert Wong Kwai-huen | 1,970 | 43.85 | |
| Majority | | 558 | 12.35 | |
| Total valid votes | | 4,498 | 100.00 | |
| Rejected ballots | | 132 | | |
| Turnout | | 4,630 | 71.43 | |
| Registered electors | | 6,482 | | |
| Civic hold | | Swing | | |

=== 2000s ===
2008 Legislative Council election: Legal
| Party | Candidate | Votes | % | ±% |
|---|---|---|---|---|
| Civic | Margaret Ng Ngoi-yee | 2,468 | 65.74 | −8.99 |
| Independent | Junius Ho Kwan-yiu | 1,286 | 34.26 | |
| Majority | | 182 | 6.60 | |
| Total valid votes | | 3,745 | 100.00 | |
| Rejected ballots | | 127 | | |
| Turnout | | 3,872 | 63.36 | |
| Registered electors | | 6,111 | | |
| Civic hold | | Swing | | |

2004 Legislative Council election: Legal
| Party | Candidate | Votes | % | ±% |
|---|---|---|---|---|
| Independent (A45CG) | Margaret Ng Ngoi-yee | 2,597 | 74.73 | +13.98 |
| Independent | Kwong Ka-yin | 598 | 17.21 | |
| Independent | Tong Kei-yuk | 280 | 8.06 | |
| Majority | | 1,999 | 57.52 | |
| Total valid votes | | 3,475 | 100.00 | |
| Rejected ballots | | 127 | | |
| Turnout | | 3,666 | 72.26 | |
| Registered electors | | 5,073 | | |
| Independent hold | | Swing | | |

2000 Legislative Council election: Legal
| Party | Candidate | Votes | % | ±% |
|---|---|---|---|---|
| Independent | Margaret Ng Ngoi-yee | 1,520 | 60.75 | −15.84 |
| Independent | Anthony Chow Wing-kin | 982 | 39.25 | |
| Majority | | 538 | 21.50 | |
| Total valid votes | | 2,502 | 100.00 | |
| Rejected ballots | | 37 | | |
| Turnout | | 2,539 | 61.15 | |
| Registered electors | | 4,152 | | |
| Independent hold | | Swing | | |

=== 1990s ===
1998 Legislative Council election: Legal
| Party | Candidate | Votes | % | ±% |
|---|---|---|---|---|
| Independent | Margaret Ng Ngoi-yee | 1,741 | 76.59 | +22.07 |
| Independent | Siu Wing-yee | 394 | 17.33 | |
| Independent | Chong Wing-charn | 138 | 6.07 | |
| Majority | | 1,347 | 59.26 | |
| Total valid votes | | 2,273 | 100.00 | |
| Rejected ballots | | 47 | | |
| Turnout | | 2,320 | 65.56 | |
| Registered electors | | 3,539 | | |
| Independent hold | | Swing | | |

1995 Legislative Council election: Legal
| Party | Candidate | Votes | % | ±% |
|---|---|---|---|---|
| Independent | Margaret Ng Ngoi-yee | 723 | 54.52 | |
| Independent | Ip Tim-yeung | 444 | 33.48 | |
| Independent | Lee Wai-ip | 159 | 12.00 | |
| Majority | | 279 | 21.04 | |
| Total valid votes | | 1,326 | 100.00 | |
| Rejected ballots | | 33 | | |
| Turnout | | 1,359 | 69.98 | |
| Registered electors | | 1,942 | | |
| Independent gain from Independent | | Swing | | |

1991 Legislative Council election: Legal
| Party | Candidate | Votes | % | ±% |
|---|---|---|---|---|
| Independent | Ip Sik-on | 542 | 77.43 | |
| Independent | Man Yit-loi | 158 | 22.57 | |
| Majority | | 384 | 54.86 | |
| Total valid votes | | 700 | 100.00 | |
| Rejected ballots | | 14 | | |
| Turnout | | 714 | 57.58 | |
| Registered electors | | 1,240 | | |
| Independent gain from Independent | | Swing | | |

=== 1980s ===
1988 Legislative Council election: Legal
| Party | Candidate | Votes | % | ±% |
|---|---|---|---|---|
| Independent | Martin Lee Chu-ming | Unopposed | | |
| Independent hold | | Swing | | |

1985 Legislative Council election: Legal
| Party | Candidate | Votes | % | ±% |
|---|---|---|---|---|
| Independent | Martin Lee Chu-ming | 488 | 57.89 | |
| Independent | Henry Denis Litton | 312 | 37.01 | |
| Civic | Edmund Chow Wai-hung | 43 | 5.10 | |
| Majority | | 176 | 20.88 | |
| Total valid votes | | 843 | 100.00 | |
| Independent win (new seat) | | | | |
