= Junius Ho =

Hong Kong lawyer and politician (born 1962)

The Honourable Junius Ho BBS JP
- 何君堯
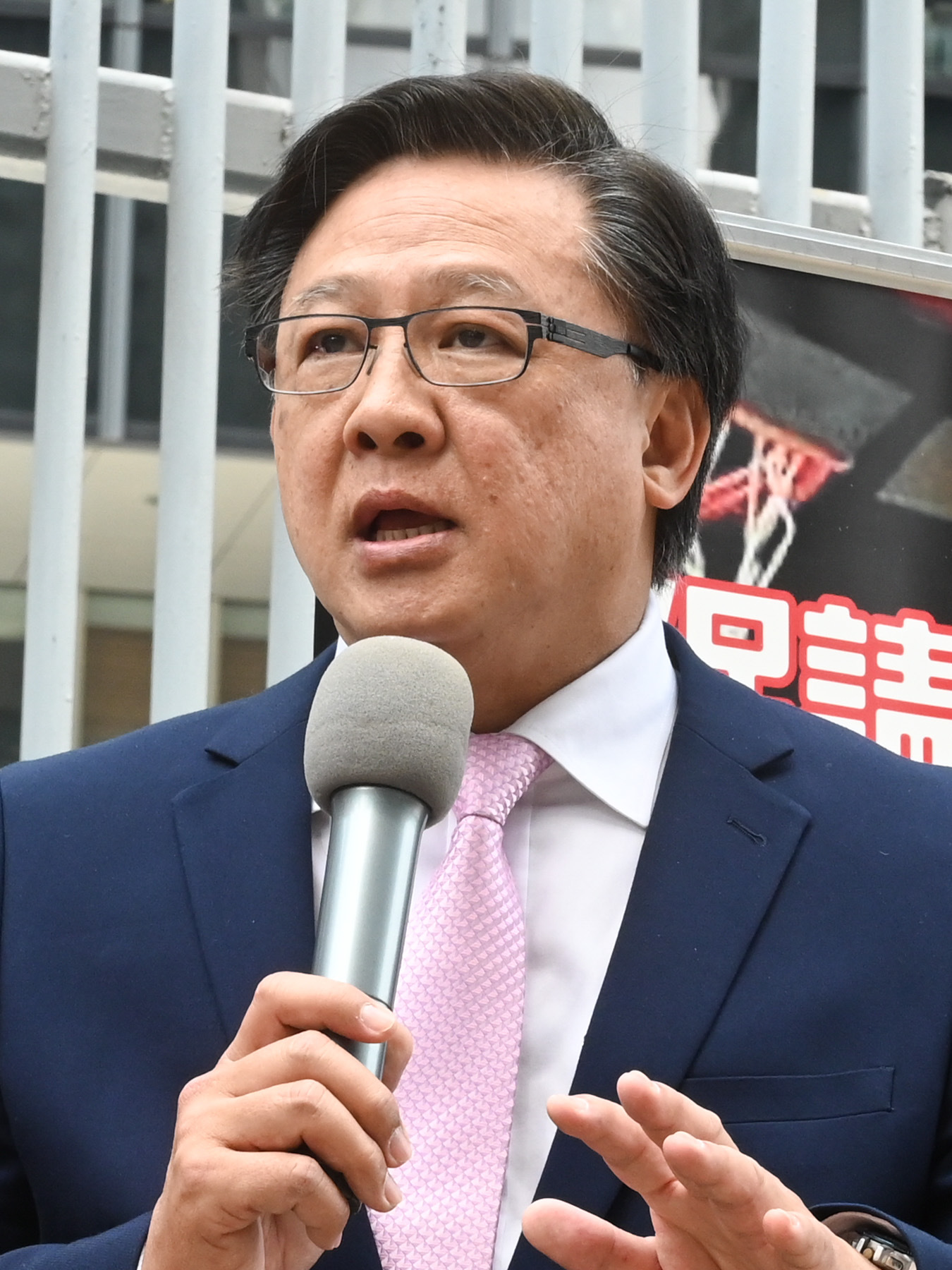
- Ho in 2025

Member of the Legislative Council
- Incumbent
- Assumed office 1 January 2022
- Preceded by: Constituency created
- Constituency: Election Committee
- In office 1 October 2016 – 31 December 2021
- Preceded by: Albert Chan
- Succeeded by: Constituency abolished
- Constituency: New Territories West

Member of the Tuen Mun District Council
- In office 1 January 2016 – 31 December 2019
- Preceded by: Albert Ho
- Succeeded by: Lo Chun-yu
- Constituency: Lok Tsui

Personal details
- Born: 4 June 1962 (age 64) Tuen Mun, Hong Kong
- Spouse: Cecilia Chan
- Children: 3
- Education: Chelmer Institute of Higher Education (LLB); University of Hong Kong
- Occupation: Solicitor politician
- Website: www.juniusho.com

Junius Ho
- Traditional Chinese: 何君堯
- Simplified Chinese: 何君尧
Transcriptions
Standard Mandarin
- Hanyu Pinyin: Hé Jūnyáo
Yue: Cantonese
- Jyutping: ho4 gwan1 jiu4

Junius Ho Kwan-yiu BBS JP (Chinese: 何君堯; born 4 June 1962) is a Hong Kong lawyer and politician who currently serves as a member in the Hong Kong Legislative Council. A prominent radical pro-Beijing and anti-gay rights public figure in Hong Kong’s political landscape, he formerly served as president of the Law Society of Hong Kong, chairman of the Tuen Mun Rural Committee and as an elected member of the Tuen Mun District Council from 2015 to 2019.

== Early life and education ==
Ho comes from a family of village leaders. He grew up in the old site of Leung Tin Village (Chinese: 良田村) in Tuen Mun. He is a 32nd-generation descendant of his Hakka clan, which can be traced back to the 10th century.

Ho attended Queen's College Hong Kong from 1975 to 1979, after which he went to the United Kingdom, where he enrolled at Chelmer Institute of Higher Education and obtained his bachelor of laws degree in 1984. Ho joined a post-graduate programme at the University of Hong Kong in 1984 and obtained his mandatory practising qualification, the postgraduate certificate in laws (PCLL) in 1986.

== Legal career ==
After gaining his qualifications he was admitted as a solicitor in Hong Kong in 1988 and similarly admitted in Singapore, and England and Wales in 1995 and 1997. He is the senior partner of a law firm in Hong Kong and a principal representative of a law firm in Guangzhou. His major practice field is civil litigation, specialising in shareholders' disputes and family disputes. He was appointed a China-Appointed Attesting Officer in 2003.

He became the vice-president of the Law Society of Hong Kong in June 2005 and was elected president for a one-year term in May 2011, after which he has served as a council member.

In 2017, his legal qualifications in England and Wales, and Singapore were disputed, and the Solicitors Regulation Authority (SRA) was contacted regarding this matter. It was reported that the individual by the name of "Junius Kwan-Yiu Ho" does not appear to be on the SRA's records. The dispute, however, was later clarified, for a member by the name of "Kwan Yiu Ho" does appear to be on SRA's records.

=== Honorary awards ===
==== Anglia Ruskin University ====
In 2011, by Anglia Ruskin University granted Junius Ho the degree Honorary Doctor of Laws, with the university describing him as an "outstanding ambassador". After the 2019 Yuen Long attack, an online petition via Change.org was launched urging Anglia Ruskin University to reconsider the honorary award, and the university was notified after the petition reached 500 signatures on 25 July 2019. On 26 October, Lord Alton of Liverpool published a letter addressed to the vice-chancellor of Anglia Ruskin University, requesting the university to consider removing Ho's honorary doctorate, citing alleged examples of "misogyny", "extremism" and "racism". On 28 October 2019, at the urging of activist Luke de Pulford Anglia Ruskin University withdrew Ho's honorary degree following an investigation, with a statement from the university noting, "Mr Ho's conduct since he was honoured has caused increasing concern."

==== China University of Political Science and Law ====
On 6 December 2019, Ho received an honorary doctorate in law from the China University of Political Science and Law for his "outstanding contribution and achievements in the legal sector".

== Political career ==
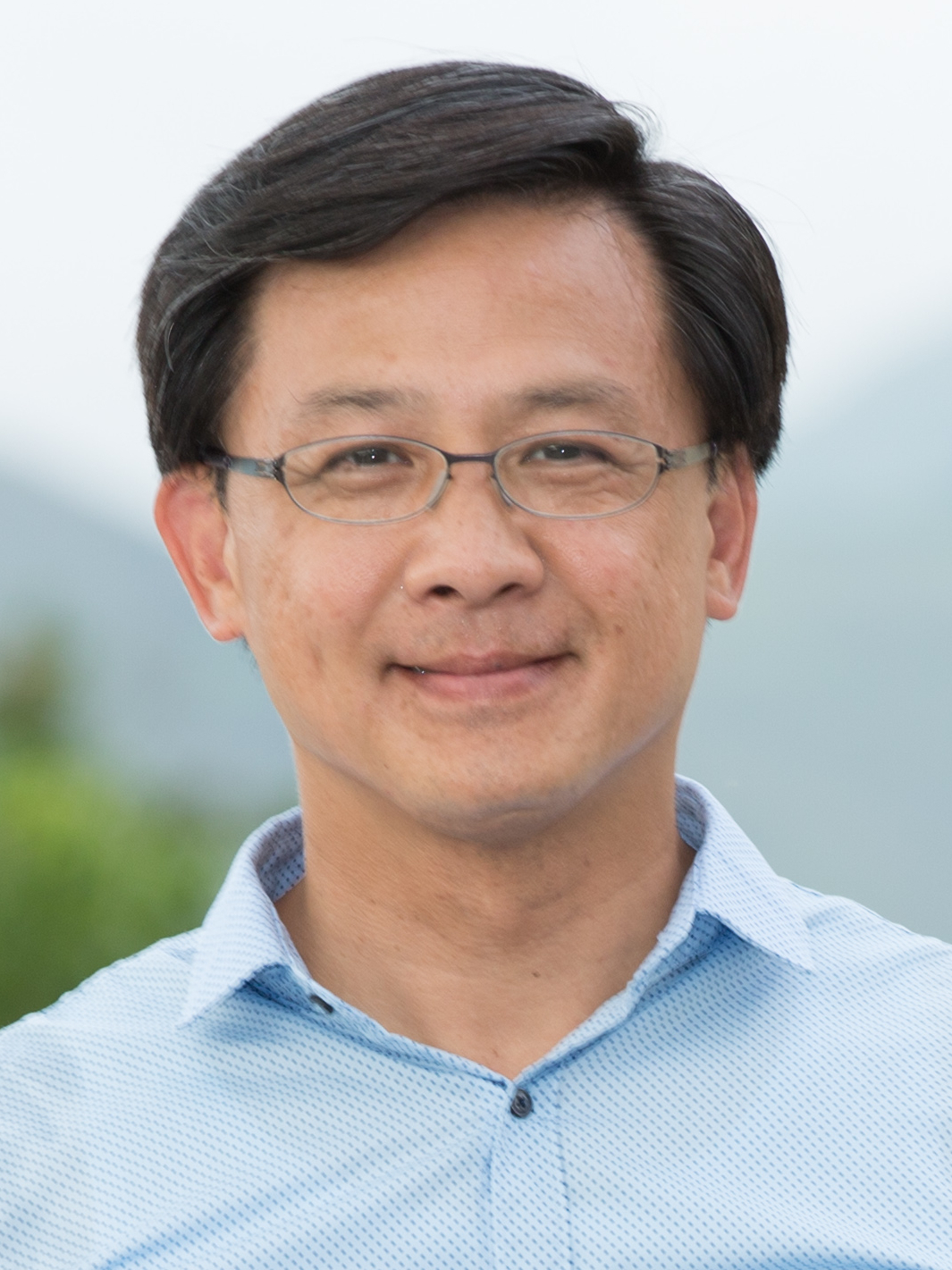
Ho in 2018

Ho first contested a Legislative Council election in 2008, running against Civic Party's Margaret Ng in the Legal functional constituency. He was defeated, receiving 1,286 votes, about 34 percent of the vote.

Ho was elected as Chairman of Tuen Mun Rural Committee in 2011, ousting the long-time chairman and most powerful rural leader Lau Wong-fat, chairman of the Heung Yee Kuk. In that capacity, he became an ex officio member of the Tuen Mun District Council. He served as the rural committee chairman until 2015. He was a candidate in the Legislative Council election in New Territories West in September 2012, where he received 10,805 votes, about two per cent of total vote share and was not elected.

Ho was appointed to Lingnan University council by Chief Executive of Hong Kong Leung Chun-ying in October 2015. Students staged a protest against the appointment over fears of political interference in university governance.

In the 2015 District Council elections, Junius Ho defeated Albert Ho of the Democratic Party in the latter's long-held Lok Tsui constituency seat in a six-way contest by a narrow margin of 277 votes, as the pro-democracy votes were split between Albert Ho and Cheng Chung-tai of Civic Passion. Ho ran again in the 2016 Legislative Council election for the New Territories West. During the election, Ho's supporters were allegedly involved in the withdrawal of candidacy of Liberal Party candidate Ken Chow Wing-kan. Chow claimed he had been intimidated after receiving threats made against him. On the following day, Ho identified that some of the threats were made by one of his volunteers that had helped him for about one or two months; but Ho defended him by stating that the volunteer only wanted to be angry for him. Ho was elected with 35,657 votes, winning the last of nine seats in the constituency.

In May 2017, pro-democracy lawyer Kevin Yam published an article urging solicitors not to vote for Junius Ho in the election for the governing council of the Law Society of Hong Kong. Ho sued for defamation but failed to be re-elected, securing only 572 of 8,148 votes, coming last. In the 2019 District Council elections, Ho lost his seat with 2,626 votes to his rival Lo Chun-yu who had 1,213 more votes.

In December 2021, Hong Kong Free Press reported that Ho's voting power in the 2021 Hong Kong legislative election was approximately 7,215 times more than that of an ordinary citizen, as he was a member of the Election Committee and thus could vote for the 40 Legislative Council members elected by the Election Committee constituency; an individual voter in the Heung Yee Kuk functional constituency; a representative of Ho K.C. & Fong Solicitors & Notaries which was a corporate voter in the Commercial (First) functional constituency; as well as being a regular voter in his geographical constituency, New Territories North.

In December 2021, he was re-elected as Legislative Councilor through Election Committee constituency with 1,263 votes.

In November 2023, Secretary for Security Chris Tang refuted Ho's claims that the Security Bureau was making too nice of a prison. Later, an SCMP editorial re-affirmed Tang's comments and said that the prison's upgrades were necessary.

In December 2025, he was re-elected as Legislative Councilor through Election Committee constituency again with 1,241 votes.

=== Victim of Tuen Mun knife attack ===
On 6 November 2019, in preparation for the 2019 Hong Kong District Council elections, Junius Ho ran a campaign event in Tuen Mun. He was approached by a man posing as a supporter, who attacked him with a 33-centimetre-long knife that left him bleeding in the chest. The attacker was shortly subdued. Ho was briefly hospitalized.

== Political views ==
Junius Ho was mentioned by Politico Europe as a pro-government and ultraconservative.

=== Opposition to same-sex marriage and LGBTQ+ ===
Ho has made several controversial statements regarding issues related to the LGBT community. In late April 2017, following a lawsuit on government benefits for civil workers who are in a same-sex relationship, Ho said that the legalization of same-sex marriage in Hong Kong would lead to the acceptance of bestiality and incest. Ho's remarks were criticized by other LegCo members. For instance, Raymond Chan, an openly gay then-member of LegCo, strongly condemned Ho's comments.

In May 2017, Ho said that a ruling granting marriage benefits to a gay civil servant could lead to "chaos in society" and co-signed a petition asking the government to appeal the decision. In April 2018, Ho became the only legislator to vote against the appointments of foreign judges Brenda Hale and Beverley McLachlin to the Court of Final Appeal over their support of same-sex rights, claiming the two opposed traditional family values.

In June 2021, commenting of Hong Kong's hosting of the Gay Games, Ho said that people 'should not let gays sideline '"natural people"'. He also called the Games “disgraceful”, saying any revenue generated from the event would be “dirty money”. He followed up with further homophobic remarks, saying: “It is your business what you do in your own room, but if you go out and do it in public, it’s disgraceful”.

In February 2022, Ho again criticized same-sex marriage, this time saying it could breach the national security law. Ho, in January 2022, similarly brought up the national security law to attack those advocating the "living with Covid" strategy.

In April 2023, Ho protested against the Gay Games and said "We must think from the perspective of national security and prevent people from using the Gay Games to once again destroy Hong Kong."

=== Tiananmen Square memorialization motion ===
In June 2017, Junius Ho became the only pro-establishment lawmaker to vote in favour of a motion to memorialize the 4 June 1989 massacre of Tiananmen Square protestors at the Legislative Council. He expressed sympathy for the Chinese students before the People's Liberation Army crackdown. However, Ho also criticized pro-democracy legislators for describing the government of mainland China as 'cold-blooded'. Eddie Chu criticized Ho's position as unclear and absurd, and compared him to Yuan Mu, a Chinese politician who in an interview with Tom Brokaw in 1989 claimed that there were no casualties during the crackdown in Tiananmen Square.

=== Opposition to Occupy Central with Love and Peace ===
Ho was a leading critic of legal scholar Benny Tai's Occupy Central with Love and Peace which suggested a full-scale occupation protest in the form of civil disobedience to press the Beijing government to make concessions on electoral reform. He set up an anti-Occupy group called "Protect Central" which he said would resist the Occupy campaign.

In August 2017, Ho called for the removal of Tai, who was then facing charges of inciting others to incite public nuisance, from working at the University of Hong Kong (HKU). Vice-chancellor Peter Mathieson and council chairman Arthur Li rejected the call. Ho submitted a petition, appearing to have the support of over 80,000, urging the university to investigate Tai and organised a rally on 17 September calling for his removal. Ho acknowledged that the number of people digitally signing the petition was unverifiable. As to the legality of the rally, Ronny Tong Ka-wah pointed out that the Public Order Ordinance may have been violated.

In September 2017, Ho said supporters of Hong Kong independence ought to be "killed mercilessly". He made the comment at a rally which he organised to demand that HKU fire Benny Tai. He stated that it was "not a big deal to kill pigs or dogs", and also appeared on a Commercial Radio programme, where he said of pro-independence activists, "Why shouldn't these people be killed?" In response to backlash over these remarks, Ho said "If we’re talking about Hong Kong independence, that means war. What's wrong with killing enemies in a war?" Ho's remarks were condemned by figures on all sides of the political spectrum. Senior Counsel Ronny Tong said that Ho's comments may have violated the Public Order Ordinance. Chief executive Carrie Lam alluded to Ho's comments when she stated on 19 September that "unacceptably cruel, insulting and intimidating comments" had no place in a civilised society. Executive Council member Regina Ip called Ho's remarks "stupid", and continued, "It will do our country no good to have stupid 'patriots', including possibly quite a few hired to become 'patriots'." The 22 lawmakers from the pro-democracy camp issued a joint statement condemning Ho's remarks, which read in part: "Ho, as a legislator and lawyer, expressed hate speech involving murder at a public event, crossing the bottom lines of free speech and morality and severely breaching professional conduct."

Ho maintained that he was expressing his contempt at the pro-independence movement, and said that the journalists should not take his words out of context.

=== Sanctions ===
In February 2021, Ho asked the Hong Kong government to order banks to re-open bank accounts of those sanctioned under United States Executive Order 13936, even though doing so would cause banks to risk losing their licenses and ability to process US Dollars.

=== COVID-19 ===
In January 2022, Ho claimed that people advocating "living with Covid" could be in breach of the National Security Law. One day later, the government shortly responded that Ho's statement was not true.

=== Glory to Hong Kong ===
In November 2022, after Glory to Hong Kong was played after a rugby match, Ho said that the Hong Kong Rugby team "let their country be insulted" and should be disbanded.

== Controversies ==
=== Conflicts of interest accusations ===
On 25 April 2018, it was reported that Ho's family business holds the ownership of 120,000 square feet of farmland southwest of the Fanling Golf Course. Ho had previously voted against a motion to request the government to seize the golf course for housing redevelopment, but did not declare any potential conflict of interests. Ho responded that the motion did not impact his family business and therefore reporting his interests was not required. On 2 May 2018, lawmaker, Andrew Wan, filed a complaint to the legislative committee accusing Ho of failing to declare two properties that is associated to his family's company, Profit Trade Investment Ltd and other subsidiaries. One of which was an apartment located at Sham Shui Po that was allegedly sold at four times its estimated value. Wan alleged that there could potentially be a conflict of interest if related issues come up in the legislative council. On 5 May 2018, Ho admitted that Profit Trade had ownership of his family assets, but maintained that the company does not involve any conflict of interest in the Legislative Council and therefore such interests need not to be disclosed.

=== Involvement in Yuen Long attack ===
Prior to the 2019 Yuen Long attack, Ho was filmed supporting and congratulating a group of white-clad men. When confronted about his alleged involvement in the Yuen Long Attack, Ho claimed that he was simply there greeting some of his supporters, and said it was normal because he lived in Yuen Long. After the incident, Ho said that the white-clad men were only "defending their home and people". On 22 July 2019, Ho's constituency shopfront in Tsuen Wan was turned into a Lennon Wall before being destroyed later in the day. Ho's Tuen Mun office also attracted protests on the following day.

In response to Ho's alleged involvement, over 2,300 teachers, alumni and students from Ho's alma mater Queen's College participated in a signature campaign condemning Ho. They urged LegCo members to impeach Ho, and requested Queen's College Old Boys' Association to suspend his membership. Similarly, Lingnan University students have started a petition calling for Ho to be removed from the institution's governing council. An online petition requesting that the United States bar Ho and his family from entering the U.S. or acquiring U.S. citizenship achieved over 100,000 signatures.

On 23 July 2019, Ho appeared on an RTHK televised forum alongside fellow New Territories West constituency representative Eddie Chu. Ho said he did not regret shaking hands with the attackers. He called the victims of the Yuen Long attacks "rioters" and claimed they had instigated the violence. He said the mobs were mere "Yuen Long residents" seeking to "protect their homeland". After Chu stated that protesters could not remain calm if the government continued to ignore their requests (e.g. to formally withdraw the extradition bill), Ho called Chu a "scum" who "did not deserve to be a lawmaker" while storming off stage, ending the interview.

Later, when Ho's parents' graves were vandalized, Ho accused Chu and his supporters for the damage. In one of Ho's video postings on social media, it was reported that Ho warned Chu in Cantonese that he has two paths to choose from. One of which is "a path of being alive, (and the other) is a path of not being alive." Chu dismissed the threat and stated that it was merely Ho's style of talking. Chu, however, added that it was also a way for Ho to lead his supporters into believing that he was culpable for the damage to Ho's parents' tomb.

=== Insults ===
During a 2019 Legislative Council meeting, Ho made a remark directed toward fellow Legislative Council member Claudia Mo, stating that she is used to "eating foreign sausage". Mo, who is married to English journalist Philip Bowring, later told the council that the comment amounts to racism and sexual harassment. Ho refused to apologise and was expelled from the meeting.

=== Attacks on CUHK ===
In January 2021, Ho blamed the 2019–2020 Hong Kong protests on CUHK and likened its students to Al-Queda members, stating "What I see from this picture - I thought Al-Qaeda changed its registered office to CUHK."

=== Covid-19 restrictions from Birthday party ===
On 5 January 2022, Carrie Lam announced new warnings and restrictions against social gathering due to potential COVID-19 outbreaks. One day later, it was discovered that Ho attended a birthday party hosted by Witman Hung Wai-man, with 222 guests. At least one guest tested positive with COVID-19, causing all guests to be quarantined. Ho later claimed that the real issue was not the party, but the government's policy of allowing aircrew from Cathay Pacific to quarantine at home. Ho also claimed that he was a victim of the incident, saying "We are the victims of the policy", and also said that nobody could have predicted the risk of coronavirus exposure from the event, despite earlier warnings from the government to not gather in large groups. Ho also said he was "illegally detained" at the quarantine center, and that Carrie Lam should resign.

== Current positions ==
- Advisory board member of Yan Oi Tong (1997 to present)
- Indigenous Inhabitant Representative of Leung Tin Tsuen

== Honours and awards ==
- Justice of the Peace (1 July 2016)
- Honorary LLD from the China University of Political Science and Law (2019)

== Personal life ==
He owns two horses, Alex Flyer (天祿) and Hong Kong Bet (青山之寶) that race at The Hong Kong Jockey Club. The graves of Ho's parents were vandalized during the 2019–20 Hong Kong protests, which is believed to be due to his association with the Yuen Long attacks, though the identity of the perpetrators remains unknown.

On 31 August 2022, Ho tested positive for COVID-19.

== See also ==
- Chinese nationalism
- Hong Kong Liaison Office

Legal offices
Preceded by Huen Wong	President of Law Society of Hong Kong; 2011–2012	Succeeded by Dieter Yih
Political offices
Preceded by Albert Ho	Member of Tuen Mun District Council; Representative for Lok Tsui; 2016–2019	Succeeded by Lo Chun-yu
Legislative Council of Hong Kong
Preceded by Albert Chan	Member of Legislative Council; Representative for New Territories West; 2016–2021	Constituency abolished
New constituency	Member of Legislative Council; Representative for Election Committee; 2022–present	Incumbent
Order of precedence
Preceded by Jimmy Ng; Member of the Legislative Council	Hong Kong order of precedence Member of the Legislative Council	Succeeded by Ho Kai-ming; Member of the Legislative Council
