= Ambrose Lam =

Hong Kong solicitor known for pro-Beijing political stance

- 林新強
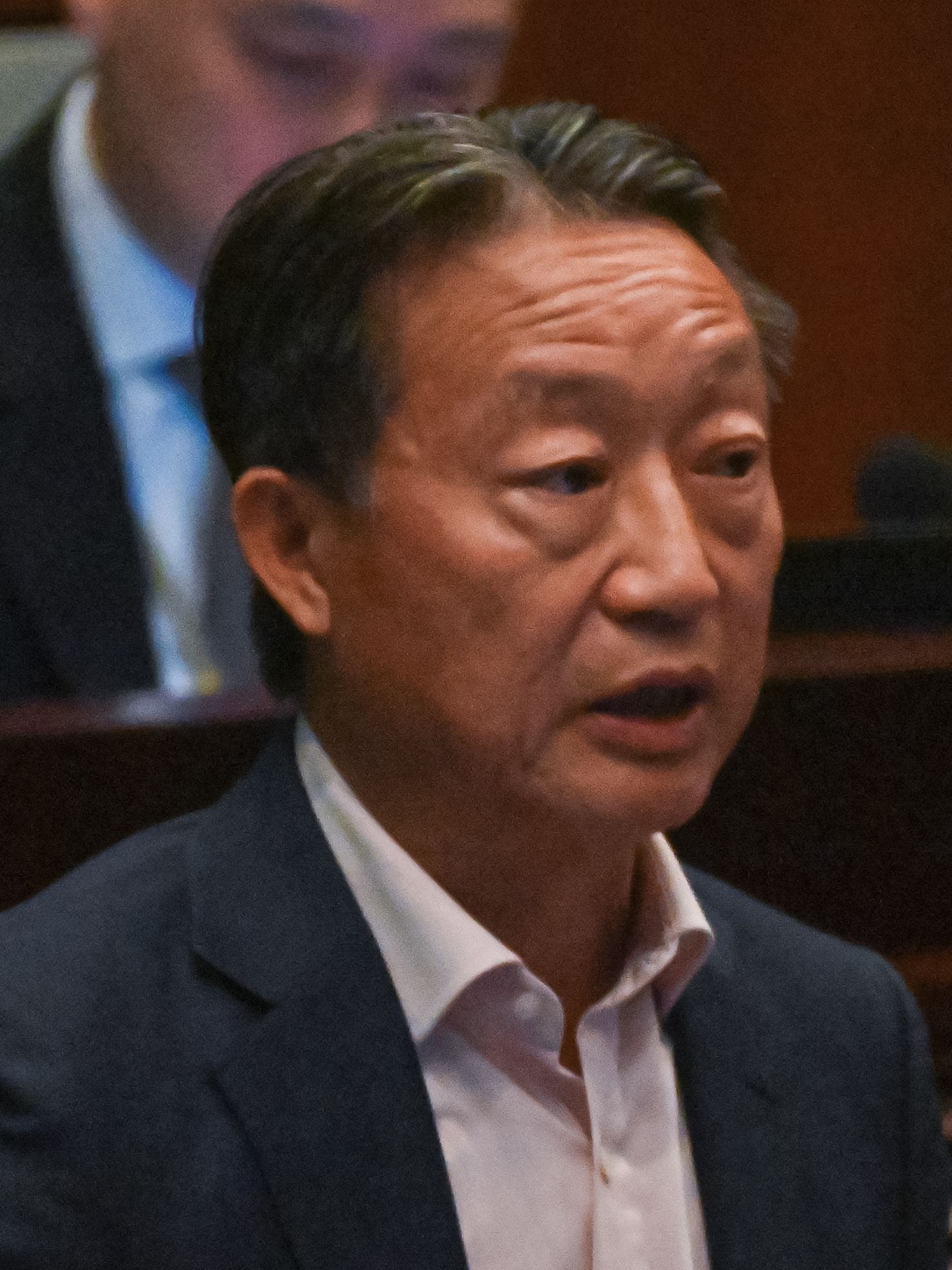
- Lam in 2023

Member of the Legislative Council
- In office 1 January 2022 – 31 December 2025
- Preceded by: Dennis Kwok (2020)
- Succeeded by: Nicholas Chan
- Constituency: Legal

President of the Law Society of Hong Kong
- In office 21 May 2013 – 19 August 2014
- Preceded by: Dieter Yih
- Succeeded by: Stephen Hung

Personal details
- Born: August 1961 (age 65) Hong Kong
- Education: University of Essex
- Occupation: Solicitor

Ambrose Lam San-keung JP (Chinese: 林新強; born August 1961) is a Hong Kong solicitor and former politician. He was a member of the Legislative Council representing legal functional constituency from 2022 to 2025 and the president of the Law Society, the professional association for solicitors in Hong Kong, from 2013 until his resignation in 2014.

As president of the Law Society, he was known for his outspoken support for Beijing, having made various comments in 2014 in support of a government-proposed electoral reform and the Chinese Communist Party. These comments culminated in his resignation.

== Early life and education ==
Lam San-keung was born in Hong Kong in August 1961. He studied at the University of Essex and graduated with a Bachelor of Laws.

== Legal practice ==
Lam was admitted as a solicitor in Hong Kong in 1988. In 1991, he founded the law firm Lam Lee & Lai as a partner, specialising in conveyancing and commercial law.

He was then admitted in Singapore and in England and Wales in 1993. In 2003, he was appointed as a China-Appointed Attesting Officer by the Chinese Ministry of Justice. Lam had also been a mediator for the China International Economic and Trade Arbitration Commission, the Guangzhou Arbitration Commission, the Xiamen Arbitration Commission and the Shenzhen Court of International Arbitration.

In 2014, Lam, Lee & Lai's joint venture with a mainland Chinese firm was approved as the first joint-operation firm to operate in the Qianhai special economic zone in Shenzhen. In 2016, Lam became a partner at L&Y Law Office and remained until February 2018. The next month, Lam founded his firm, Ambrose Lam & Co. In May, Lam's firm established an association with the Hong Kong branch of Grandall Law Firm, and a year later, in April 2019, Lam joined F. Zimmern & Co as a managing partner, merging his business into the firm.

== The Law Society of Hong Kong ==
In 2004, Lam joined the Council of the Law Society. He was first elected as a vice-president of the society in 2011. He also led 12 candidates and council members to participate in the 2011 Election Committee subsector elections, but none of them were successful.

=== Presidency ===
Lam was elected president of the society in May 2013. Five months into the office, Lam criticised the Occupy Central movement that planned to block roads in the business district of Central if the Hong Kong government did not advance a plan for "full democracy" in the 2017 Chief Executive election.

In June 2014, during which an electoral reform proposal was discussed, the State Council Information Office published a white paper that said Hong Kong judges have the "political requirement" of loving China and described them as one of the city's "administrators" responsible for safeguarding China's "sovereignty, security and development interests". The paper was welcomed by Chinese state media, the Hong Kong government and pro-Beijing politicians in the city, and was criticised by the Hong Kong legal sector for undermining judicial independence.

Lam said the white paper's patriotism requirement did not undermine judicial independence and that classifying the judiciary as "administrators" was not a cause of concern because the broad definition of "administration" includes all three branches of government. His views were criticised by other lawyers but he refused to withdraw his comments. In a later interview about the white paper, he said he admired the Chinese Communist Party (CCP) and described it as "very great" but "flawed", which drew further criticism. He later attributed his opinion to a 1979 incident at a European airport, when a flight attendant closed the gate on him as he ran late — an act he believed was discrimination because he was Chinese.

In response to Lam's opinions on the white paper, three solicitors, including Kevin Yam and Priscilla Choy, tabled a non-binding motion of no confidence against him that would be voted on by Law Society members. Before the vote, Apple Daily also alleged that Lam and his wife, Pamela Ku, had profited from a conflict of interest arising from an agreement to operate a conference centre. The report led Lam to sue Apple Daily and its editor-in-chief Cheung Kim-hung for defamation.

Three days before the no-confidence vote, Lam told Law Society members that his views were consistent with those of others on the Law Society leadership. He also said his opinion on the CCP was "personal" and criticised the extraordinary general meeting called for the vote as the "beginnings of politicisation".

Members of the Law Society passed the motion against Lam on 14 August with 2,392 votes (62%) in favour and 1,478 votes against. Another resolution was passed requesting Lam withdraw his statement in support of the white paper, with 2,574 votes for (65%) and 1,367 against. Solicitors faced pressure from some mainland Chinese clients and mainland-linked firms not to support the motion.

Lam resigned as president five days after the motion was passed. Lam had declined interviews by Hong Kong media.

== Political career ==
After resigning as president of the Law Society, Lam continued to be active in public life. In 2016, he and 11 other pro-Beijing figures in the legal sector urged the Hong Kong government to prosecute advocates of Hong Kong independence for sedition.

=== Member of the Legislative Council ===
Lam contested the legal functional constituency in the 2021 general election against his only opponent, Chen Xiaofeng of the Chinese Association of Hong Kong & Macao Studies, who campaigned on a platform of "no change". It was the first time only pro-Beijing candidates ran in the constituency, which had long been considered a safe seat for pan-democratic candidates before the electoral changes of 2021.

During his campaign, he said he had "little personal opinion" on the legislation of Article 23 being drafted by the government and refused to comment on whether the law should make jury trials optional or exempt the media from the theft of state secrets offence. Lam also stated that he aimed to create opportunities for lawyers in Hong Kong and broaden the scope of legal services, given that local lawyers faced intense competition. He also said he would serve as a bridge between Hong Kong and mainland China.

He received 1,637 votes (70.8%), while Chen received 674 votes. After his resignation as president of the Law Society, his electoral success has been described as a "comeback".

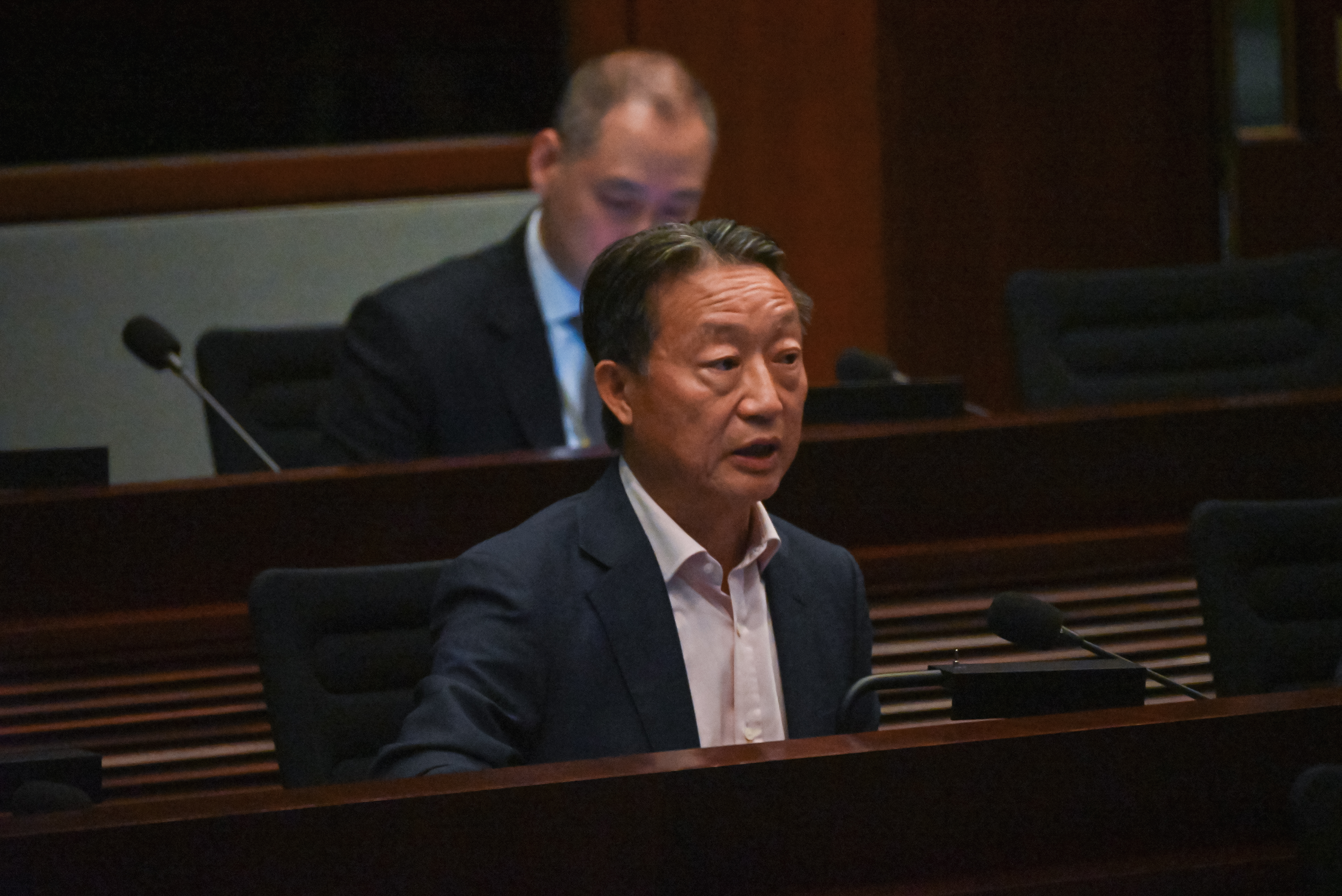
Lam speaking at a meeting of the Panel on Economic Development in 2023

As a legislator, Lam opposed foreign law firms having significant share of the Hong Kong legal services market due to geopolitical risks. He criticised the government for not protecting local firms, causing British and US firms to dominate in M&A and capital market transactions. He urged the government to allow law firms to operate as limited‑liability companies, which he believed would encourage Hong Kong firms to merge and enlarge, thus attracting business from more mainland Chinese enterprises.

Lam also supported banning lawyers without legal qualifications obtained in Hong Kong from taking part in national security cases, after the government blocked Jimmy Lai from retaining Tim Owen KC—who had never been called to the bar in Hong Kong—in a national security case. He believed that foreign lawyers did not intend to win lawsuits but instead wanted to incite Hongkongers to oppose the government.

On social issues, Lam voted to defeat a bill that would have created a system to legally recognise same-sex partnerships to encourage childbirth.

He did not stand for re-election in the 2025 election for various reasons, including to focus on his law firm business.

== Personal life ==
Lam is married to Pamela Ku.

Legislative Council of Hong Kong
| Preceded by Dennis Kwok | Member of Legislative Council; Representative for Legal; 2022–2025 | Succeeded by Nicholas Chan |
Legal offices
| Preceded by Dieter Yih | President of Law Society of Hong Kong; 2013–2014 | Succeeded by Stephen Hung |
