= Martin Lee =

Politician and barrister from Hong Kong

Martin Lee SC
- 李柱銘
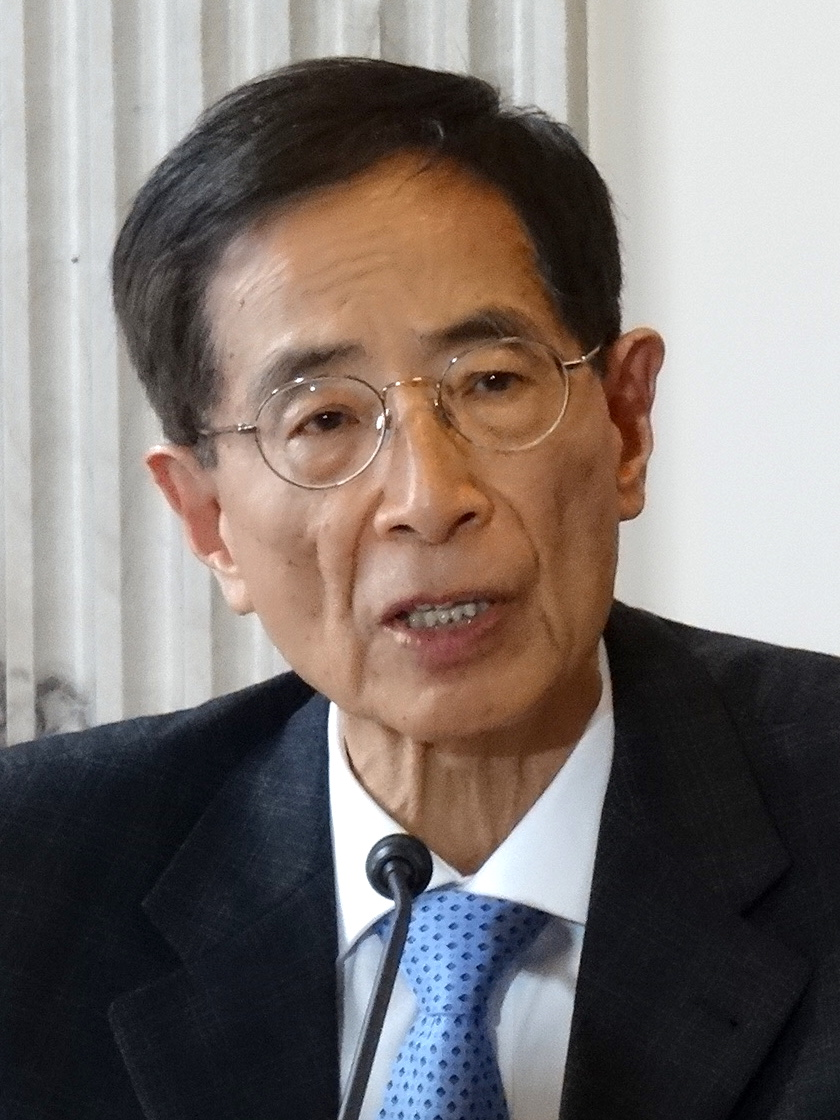
- Martin Lee at the Congressional-Executive Commission on China meeting in April 2014

Member of the Legislative Council
- In office 1 July 1998 – 30 September 2008
- Preceded by: New seat
- Succeeded by: Tanya Chan
- Constituency: Hong Kong Island
- In office 9 October 1991 – 30 June 1997
- Preceded by: Chan Ying-lun
- Succeeded by: Council abolished
- Constituency: Hong Kong Island East
- In office 30 October 1985 – 25 August 1991
- Preceded by: New constituency
- Succeeded by: Simon Ip
- Constituency: Legal

Chairman of the Democratic Party
- In office 2 October 1994 – 2 December 2002
- Preceded by: Position established
- Succeeded by: Yeung Sum

Personal details
- Born: 8 June 1938 (age 88) British Hong Kong
- Party: United Democrats (1990–1994); Democratic Party (1994–2025)
- Other political affiliations: Liberal International
- Spouse: Amelia Lee Fong Yee-ngor
- Children: 1
- Education: University of Hong Kong; Lincoln's Inn
- Website: MartinLee.org.hk

Martin Lee Chu-ming
- Traditional Chinese: 李柱銘
- Simplified Chinese: 李柱铭
Transcriptions
Standard Mandarin
- Hanyu Pinyin: Lǐ Zhùmíng
Yue: Cantonese
- Yale Romanization: Léih Chyúh-mìhng
- Jyutping: Lei^{5} Cyu^{5}-ming^{4}
- IPA: [lej˩˧ tsʰy˩˧mɪŋ˩]

Martin Lee Chu-ming SC (Chinese: 李柱銘; born 8 June 1938) is a Hong Kong politician and barrister. He is the founding chairman of the United Democrats of Hong Kong and its successor, the Democratic Party, Hong Kong's flagship pro-democracy party. He was also a member of the Legislative Council of Hong Kong from 1985 to 1997 and from 1998 to 2008. Nicknamed the "Father of Democracy" in Hong Kong, he is recognised as one of the most prominent advocates for democracy and human rights in Hong Kong and China.

A barrister by profession, Lee served as the chairman of the Hong Kong Bar Association from 1980 to 1983. In 1985 he was elected to the Legislative Council, where he advocated strongly for the protection of human rights and democratic reform. He became involved in discussions over Hong Kong's handover to China, and in 1985 he joined the Hong Kong Basic Law Drafting Committee to assist in the drafting of Hong Kong's Basic Law, the city's mini-constitution post-handover. He was, however, expelled from the body in the wake of the 1989 Tiananmen Square protests and massacre, due to his condemnation of the Chinese government and his vocal support for the student protestors.

In 1990, he became the founding chairman of the first pro-democracy party in Hong Kong, the United Democrats of Hong Kong, and later its successor, the Democratic Party. Under his leadership, the party won two landslide victories in the direct elections of 1991 and 1995, and emerged as one of the largest political parties in Hong Kong. He worked closely with the last Hong Kong Governor Chris Patten in an attempt to push forward constitutional reform in relation to democratic elections, attracting strong criticism from the Beijing government. In June 1997, he was forced to step down from his office when the colonial legislature was dissolved, alongside a number of other legislators; they later won back their seats in the Legislative Council in 1998.

He resigned as the chairman of the Democratic Party in December 2002, and in 2008 he retired as a member of the Legislative Council. Prior to July 2020 he remained active in advocating and lobbying for the democratic cause both locally and internationally. This ended with the passage of the Hong Kong National Security Law on 1 July 2020.

== Early life, education and legal career ==
A son of Kuomintang Lieutenant General Lee Yin-wo, Lee was born in Hong Kong on 8 June 1938, his mother having journeyed to the British colony on a vacation. His father fought against the Empire of Japan during World War II. In 1949, the family moved to Hong Kong after the Communist takeover of China. Lee's father taught at Wah Yan College, a Jesuit school in Kowloon, for nine years, and then taught part time at the Institute of Chinese Studies. His father maintained a good relationship with the Communist leadership, notably Premier Zhou Enlai, who repeatedly invited him back to the Mainland. Lee Yin-wo's funeral in 1989 was attended by people from both sides of the political spectrum.

Martin Lee studied at Wah Yan College, Kowloon and read English Literature and Philosophy at the University of Hong Kong, sponsored by his mentor, the renowned barrister Dr. Patrick Yu. After graduating in 1960, Lee taught for three years before training as a barrister at Lincoln's Inn in England. He was called to the bar and began practising law in Hong Kong in 1966. During the 1967 Hong Kong riots, Lee defended the pro-Beijing Hong Kong Federation of Trade Unions at court, thus laying the foundations of his future relationship with the Chinese Communist Party. In 1979, he was made Queen's Counsel. From 1980 to 1983, he was the chairman of the Hong Kong Bar Association.

== Political career ==
=== Entry into politics ===
Lee began his involvement in politics when the British and Chinese governments began their negotiations over Hong Kong's sovereignty in the early 1980s. Lee was in the delegation consisting of Hong Kong's young professionals led by Allen Lee, a member of the Executive and the Legislative Councils of Hong Kong in Beijing in May 1983. The delegation sought to maintain the status quo in Hong Kong and extend British rule by an additional 15 to 30 years. Their requests were turned down by Beijing officials.

Lee was concerned about the maintenance of judicial independence under Chinese rule and called for the preservation of Hong Kong's legal system. He also suggested the creation of an independent Court of Final Appeal in place of the Judicial Committee of the Privy Council after 1997. In December 1984, he was invited as one of the attendees at the signing ceremony of the Sino-British Joint Declaration. In 1985, he was among the 23 Hong Kong representatives invited by Beijing to sit on the Hong Kong Basic Law Drafting Committee to draft the mini-constitution of post-1997 Hong Kong, the Basic Law of Hong Kong, where he met another outspoken democrat Szeto Wah. Lee and Szeto became the two lone dissidents in the heavily Beijing-influenced Drafting Committee. Lee's father warned him that the Chinese Communists liked to use people and then get rid of them. Lee said he told his father that "I know the chances of implementing this policy 'One Country, Two Systems' and Hong Kong people ruling Hong Kong are not great. But then I know if I don't even try, the chances are zero."

In September 1985, Martin Lee ran in the Legislative Council elections when the Hong Kong government decided to introduce a handful of indirectly elected seats. His surprise victory over another prominent barrister Henry Litton and lawyer Edmund Chow in a three-way contest in the Legal functional constituency, elected by all the lawyers in Hong Kong, catapulted him to the political stage. He retained his seat in the 1988 re-election unopposed. He became the most recognisable and consistent voice pressing for rapid democratic reform. In the debate on the 1988 Green Paper on the Further Development of Representative Government, Lee was at the forefront of a campaign to introduce direct elections in the 1988 election with Szeto Wah, who won a seat in 1985 through the Teaching constituency. He and other liberals formed the Joint Committee on the Promotion of Democratic Government in 1986, which consisted of about 190 organisations who rallied support for direct elections, including the collection of 220,000 signatures (incl. names and identity card numbers). However, the government concluded in the White Paper that direct elections should not be introduced in 1988 based on public opinion. Lee condemned the government for mishandling the consultative exercise, accusing them of backing down on direct elections in the face of Beijing's pressure.

He also campaigned against the construction of the Daya Bay Nuclear Power Plant in 1986 in which the Chernobyl disaster sparked fears over safety among the Hong Kong public. Lee actively sought for public support through meetings and a signature campaign, which collected over one million signatures. He criticised the government for not disclosing information about the project and attempted to force the government to disclose information under the Legislative Council Power and Privilege Ordinance. He again rallied public support against the amendment of the Public Order Ordinance in 1987 in which the government sought to criminalise the "publishing of false news likely to cause public alarm." Lee worked diligently against the provision, moving the amendment "that any prosecution could only be made upon official proof that a report is false and reckless and that the defendant knew that the facts are false or failed to prove the validity of the facts out of rash" but failed. The case was submitted before the United Nations Human Rights Committee in November 1988 and was eventually repealed in January 1989.

From 1988 to 1991, he was appointed chairman of the Hong Kong Consumer Council. He also served as legal adviser to the Hong Kong Journalists Association, the Scout Association of Hong Kong and numerous professional bodies.

=== Tiananmen Square protests and democracy movements ===
In the Hong Kong Basic Law Drafting Committee, Lee also actively lobbied for a democratic post-1997 political system with Szeto Wah. He and the liberals proposed the "Group of 190" proposal which demanded a directly elected government set up as soon as possible. Their view was countered by a number of conservatives in the Drafting and Consultative Committees who rallied under the name of the "Group of 89" backed by big-business interests.

During the Tiananmen Square protests May and June 1989, Martin Lee was an outspoken supporter of the student movement for more democracy and freedom in China. He, Szeto Wah and other liberals formed the Hong Kong Alliance in Support of Patriotic Democratic Movements in China in May of which he was the vice-chairman, organising multiple rallies in support of the students in Hong Kong which attracted hundreds of thousands of attendees. After the military crackdown, Lee led the Hong Kong demonstration against the Beijing authorities. He told BBC's Jonathan Dimbleby that "handing over 5.5 million people to China who are deemed counter-revolutionary is like handing over 5.5 million Jews to Nazi Germany during the Second World War, when they were born in a British territory." He also said that it could not be presumed that "the Joint Declaration is as inviolable as the Bible. Britain and China should restart talks to reach a better agreement for Hong Kong than the declaration decided in 1984." He also testified before the United States Congress Committee on human rights and aired support to imposing economic sanctions against for the massacre.

In July 1989, he and Szeto Wah were labelled as "counter-revolutionaries" by the state-owned People's Daily. The duo's membership in the Drafting Committee was subsequently stripped by the National People's Congress Standing Committee after they were barred from attending any meetings due to their "anti-China stance". He was then barred from entering mainland China, with the only exception of a brief visit in Guangdong in 2005 as a Legislative Council member, in which he responded: "As a Chinese citizen, I am not allowed back to my own country even though I'm welcome in every country in the world." The strained relationship between Lee and the Communist Party also led to the constant attacks from the pro-Beijing media.

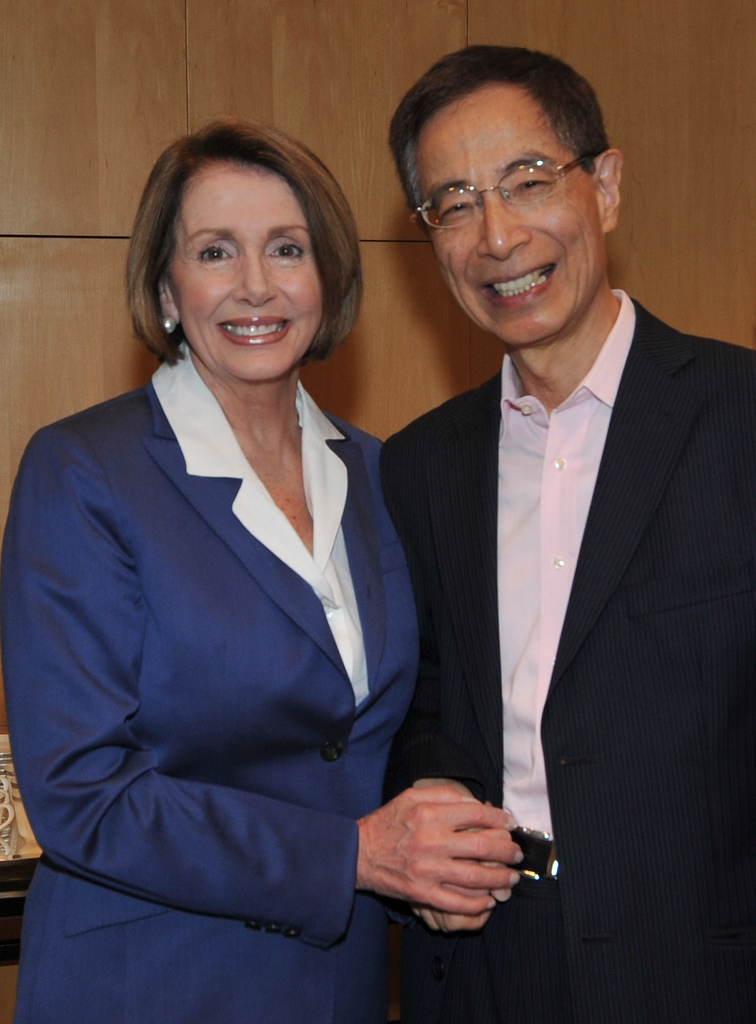
Lee with US Speaker of the House Nancy Pelosi in 2009 to discuss the status of democracy in Hong Kong

In response to the worsening crisis of confidence in Hong Kong, he joined hands with many politicians from different spectrum to advocating the granting of the right of abode in Britain to Hong Kong people as a "safety exit". He also called for the rapid introduction of the Hong Kong Bill of Rights Ordinance and a fully democratically elected Legislative Council before 1997. He also began to lobby the United States to develop a specific policy on Hong Kong's democracy development. However he opposed the US idea of withdrawing "most favoured nation" status from Beijing. Martin Lee's efforts resulted in the adoption of the United States–Hong Kong Policy Act in 1992.

Martin Lee has increasingly been seen as the spokesman for Hong Kong democracy on the international stage. In June 1995, Asiaweek magazine named Lee one of Twenty Great Asians "who have changed the region over the past two decades." In September 1995, ABC TV named Martin Lee its "Person of the Week" for leading Hong Kong's pro-democracy forces to electoral success. Lee was also awarded by a number of international organisations, including the 1995 International Human Rights Award by the American Bar Association, the Prize For Freedom by the Liberal International in 1996, the Democracy Award by the US National Endowment for Democracy in 1997, and the "Schuman Medal" in 2000 which Lee was the first non-European to receive from the European Peoples Party and European Democrats. In November 2004 he was awarded by Rutgers College with the Brennan Human Rights Award.

In preparation for the first direct elections of the Legislative Council in 1991, the liberals gathered themselves on the basis of the Joint Committee on the Promotion of Democratic Government to form a first major political party in Hong Kong, the United Democrats of Hong Kong in April 1990. Martin Lee was elected the party's founding chairman. Under Lee's leadership, the United Democrats won a landslide victory in the election, pocketing 12 of the 18 directly elected seats, out of the total number of 60 seats in the Legislative Council. Martin Lee himself was elected through the Hong Kong Island East constituency, receiving the most votes in the election. After the election, the United Democrats became the largest party in the legislature.

In response to the election, the British government decided to appoint Chris Patten to become the last Hong Kong Governor. Chris Patten announced the constitutional reform package which largely expanded the electorates of the nine newly created functional constituencies. The package was strongly opposed by the Beijing government and alienated the pro-government Liberal Party led by Allen Lee who now became Beijing's allies in the legislature. The United Democrats generally supported the Chris Patten's package and eventually helped it to get passed in the Legislative Council. In response to Patten's proposal, the Beijing government decided to dismantle the "through train" agreement, which allowed the 1995 elected legislature to transition beyond 1997, and replace it with the Provisional Legislative Council in which Lee deemed "an illegal and unconstitutional body".

In preparation for the 1995 three-tier elections, the pro-democracy camp further consolidated themselves by merging the United Democrats and another moderate pro-democracy party Meeting Point into the Democratic Party in 1994 in which Martin Lee was elected the founding chairman. In the 1995 Legislative Council election in which all seats were elected, the Democratic Party scored another landslide victory, winning 12 seats of the 20 directly elected seats and 19 seats out of the total 60 seats, almost double than the second party Liberal Party. With other pro-democracy parties and individuals, the pro-democracy camp commanded about half of the seats in the legislature in the last two years of the colonial rule. On 30 June 1997 the eve of the handover of Hong Kong, the pro-democrats were forced to step down from the Legislative Council as the "through train" was dissolved.

On the eve of the handover of Hong Kong on 1 July 1997, Lee travelled to Europe, Australia and the United States to express his concerns to officials, politicians and business leaders. He met in April with US Secretary of State Madeleine K. Albright and later with President Bill Clinton, who had openly voiced out his support in democracy and human rights in China and Hong Kong. However he was dissatisfied with the Clinton administration's unwillingness to take a tough line on the Beijing's policy of Provisional Legislative Council. He met with Clinton again in 1998 during his visit to Hong Kong.

It was widely speculated that whether Martin Lee would become "Martyr Lee", a nickname given by some in the business community, after 1997 given his high-profile pro-democracy and anti-Beijing stance which was seen as "counter-revolutionary" and "subversive" by Beijing. Lee said he would never leave Hong Kong and stressed that he was not anti-China but only opposed the regime in Beijing.

=== Lee under Chinese rule ===
Martin Lee and the Democratic Party was elected back to the Legislative Council in the 1998 first election. Despite winning the most votes, the party seats decreased to 13, as their advantage was undermined by the proportional representation system installed by the Beijing-controlled Provisional Legislative Council. He went on getting re-elected for two more terms in 2000 and 2004.

A major concern about Hong Kong's legal and political autonomy was raised in January 1999 when the government sought to the interpretation of the Basic Law by the National People's Congress Standing Committee after it was defeated in the Court of Final Appeal over the legal challenges over the right of abode of a person with at least one parent was a Hong Kong resident, as the Provisional Legislative Council passed ordinances restricting the right. The Basic Law interpretation sparked outcry from various sectors. Martin Lee accused the government of "giving away" Hong Kong's autonomy and condemned this move as "a dagger striking at the heart of the rule of law" and in symbolic protest walked out of the Legislative Council with 18 other members, all dressed in black, while 600 lawyers dressed in black held a silent protest against the interpretation.

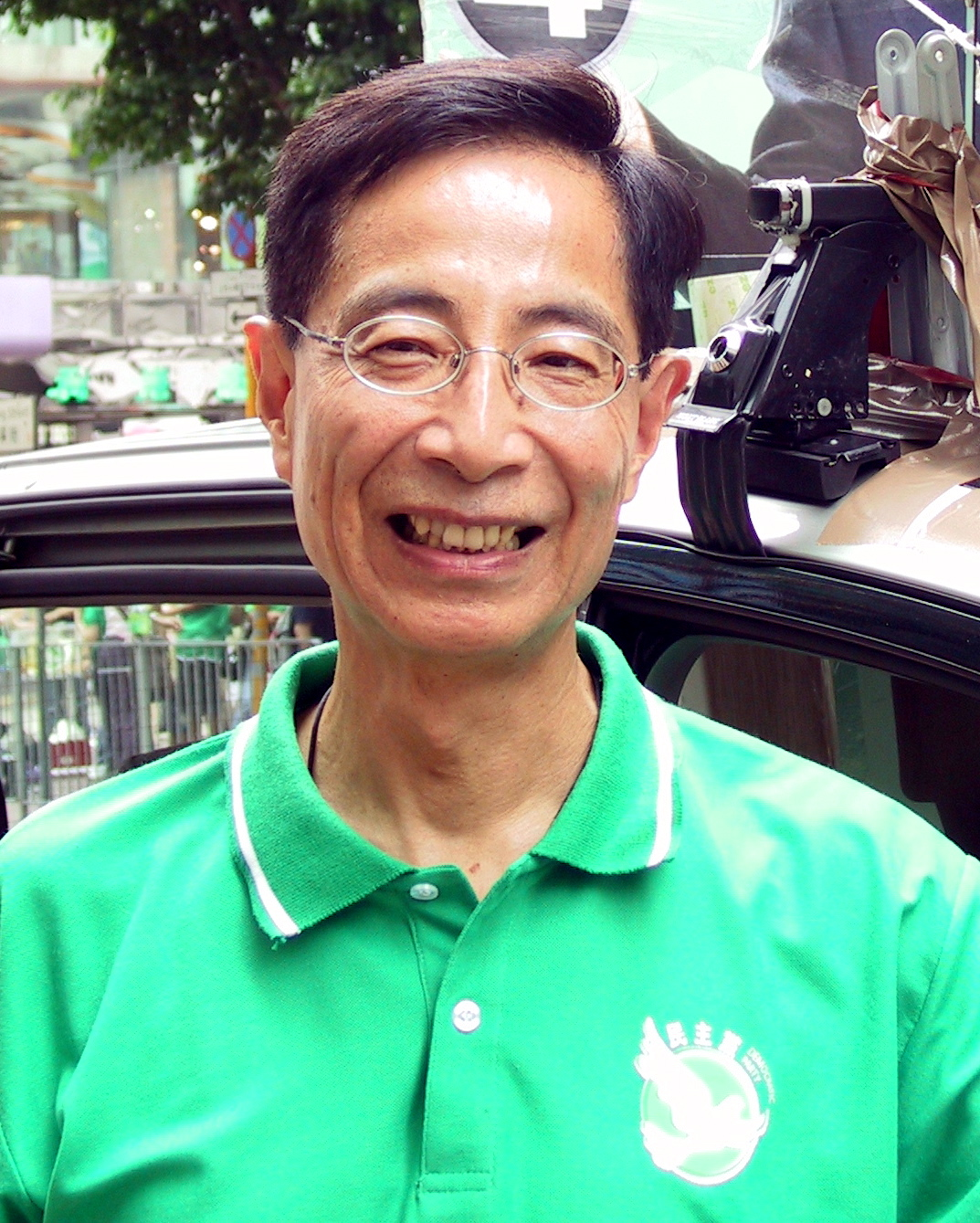
Martin Lee during the 2004 Legislative Council election campaign

Martin Lee's Democratic Party chairmanship was also embattled with the intra-party factional struggles, in which he failed to resolve the ideological differences between the party members. The radical "Young Turks" faction launched a coup d'état in the 2000 leadership election by challenging the vice-chairman post held by Anthony Cheung from the moderate faction and eventually ousted Cheung from the vice-chairman post. The factional struggles intensified the "Young Turk" leader Andrew To proposed to put the minimum wage legislation on the 2000 Legislative Council election platform which caused a fierce debate within the party and resulted in great disunity that led to the exodus of the "Young Turks" from the party and created a bad image in front of the public. Martin Lee's decision to support former Bar Association chairman and barrister Audrey Eu over his Democratic Party member in the 2000 Hong Kong Island by-election also received criticism within the party. In 2002, Martin Lee decided to step down as party chairman and was succeeded by Yeung Sum.

In 2002 and 2003, Martin Lee and the Democratic Party opposed the proposed national security legislation on the basis of the Hong Kong Basic Law Article 23 which they feared would undermine the Hong Kong people's civil liberties. Martin Lee traveled to the West to rally for international support. Chief Executive Tung Chee-hwa bashed Lee for "bad mouthing" the Special Administrative Region in front of the international audience for six years. Lee replied by saying that they were merely bad-mouthing a law that would be "thoroughly bad for Hong Kong". The protest against the Article 23 legislation eventually drew more than 500,000 people on 1 July 2003 and the government announced to shelve the bill indefinitely knowing that it could not get enough votes in the legislature. In March 2004 when Martin Lee went to Washington to testify on Hong Kong's democracy development at a US Senate Foreign Relations Committee, the Beijing officials took rounds to attack Lee for inviting foreign power meddling in Hong Kong's internal affairs. Lee was called "traitor" upon his return to Hong Kong by pro-Beijing media and supporters.

In the 2004 Legislative Council election, the pro-democracy camp filled two tickets in the Hong Kong Island geographical constituency, the Democratic Party's Yeung Sum and Martin Lee and independent–Frontier joint ticket of Audrey Eu and Cyd Ho in hope of taking four seats out of six seats with the slogan "1+1=4". However the pre-election polls showed that the Eu-Ho ticket had far more support and Lee was in danger of losing, causing the Democratic Party to request all supporters to vote instead for their ticket. As a result, the Yeung-Lee ticket drew too many votes from the Eu-Ho ticket, causing the defeat of Cyd Ho by Choy So-yuk of the pro-Beijing Democratic Alliance for the Betterment of Hong Kong, by a slim margin of 815 votes. When the results were announced in the morning of the following day, Martin Lee said in tears before cameras "I'd rather lose with dignity than win like this", on the "unexpected" defeat of Cyd Ho. It also caused disaffection from the pro-democracy supporters.

In October 2007, Lee published an article named "China's Olympic Opportunity" in The Wall Street Journal criticising Beijing for not living up to its promise to improve its human rights status during the Summer Olympic bid. Lee urged the West, particularly the United States, not to boycott the 2008 Olympic games but to instead take the opportunity while China is opening itself up to the world to "engage" China directly to bring China closer to the international community in terms of its human rights. His article received rounds of criticism from the pro-Beijing media for asking the West to "intervene" China's internal affairs. Some media even claimed that Lee asked United States to boycott the games. That immediately stirred backlash from Beijing loyalists, who virtually accused Lee of being a hanjian, traitor of the Han people. On 27 October, the Democratic Party issued an announcement to newspapers setting out the party's position regarding the article Lee published. Chairman Albert Ho reiterated, "It is not an apology, but a clear declaration of what we stand for."

After being a member of the Legislative Council for 23 years, Lee announced on 27 March 2008 that he would not seek re-election when his term ended in September of that year.

== After Legislative Council ==
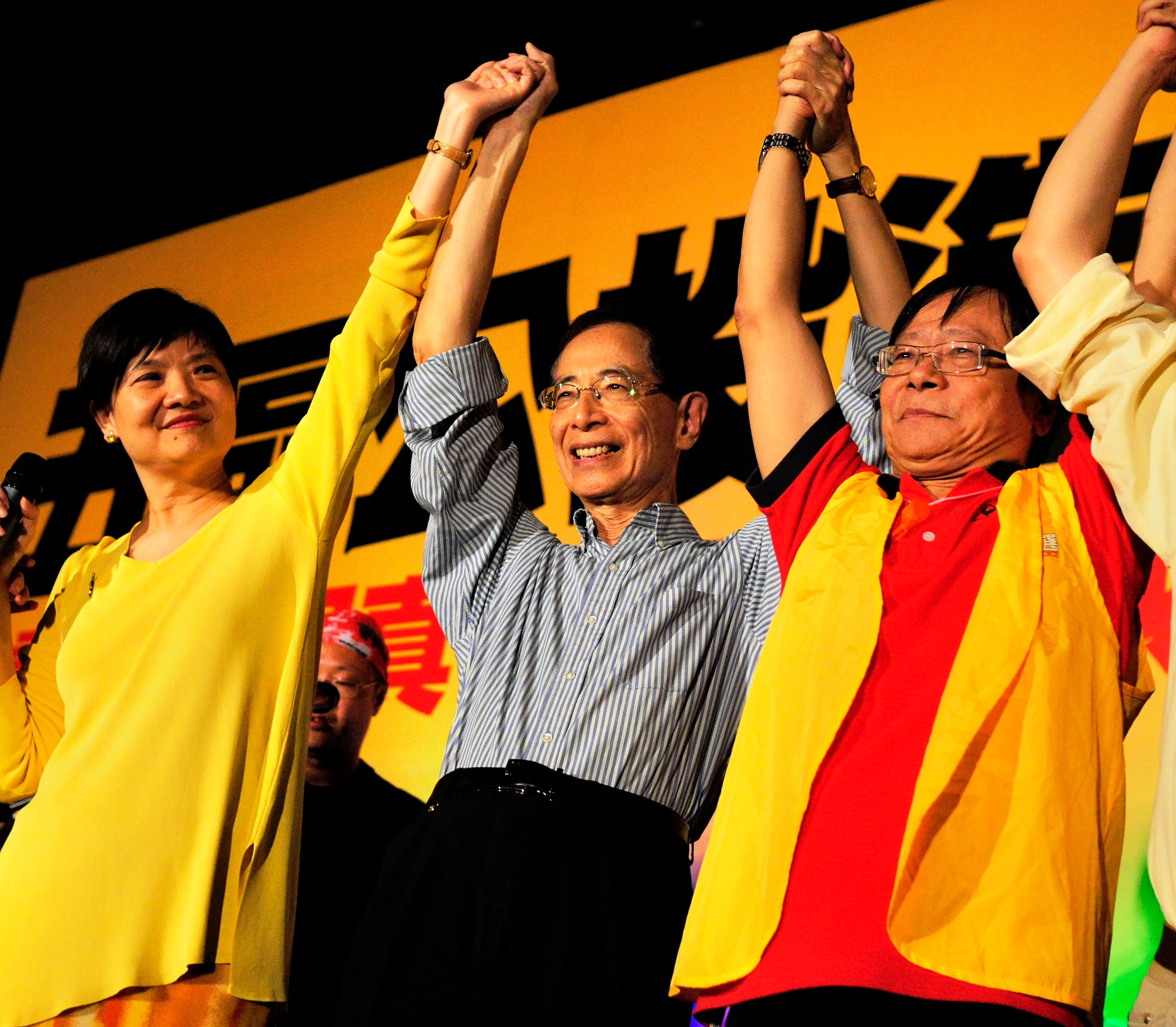
Martin Lee attended the "Five Constituencies Referendum" rally with Civic Party leader Audrey Eu and League of Social Democrats chairman Wong Yuk-man.

Martin Lee remained active in commenting politics and his legal practise after his retirement from the Legislative Council, especially taking cases of defending the pro-democracy activists who were charged for obstructing public order among other offences.

In 2009, he was marginalised by his party when he held different stance on the "Five Constituencies Referendum" proposed by the radical League of Social Democrats to press the government to implement the universal suffrage of the Chief Executive and the Legislative Council in 2012 by launching a territory-wide by-election after five pro-democracy Legislative Councillor resigned from their offices at the same time, while the majority wing of the party led by Szeto Wah openly opposed the plan who criticised Lee for "not quite understanding politics". Lee attended the rally in support of the five resigned Legislative Councillors. Meanwhile, the Democratic Party began to negotiate with the Beijing authorities and reached an agreement with the government. After the agreement, Lee expressed his disappointment and his consideration of quitting the party.

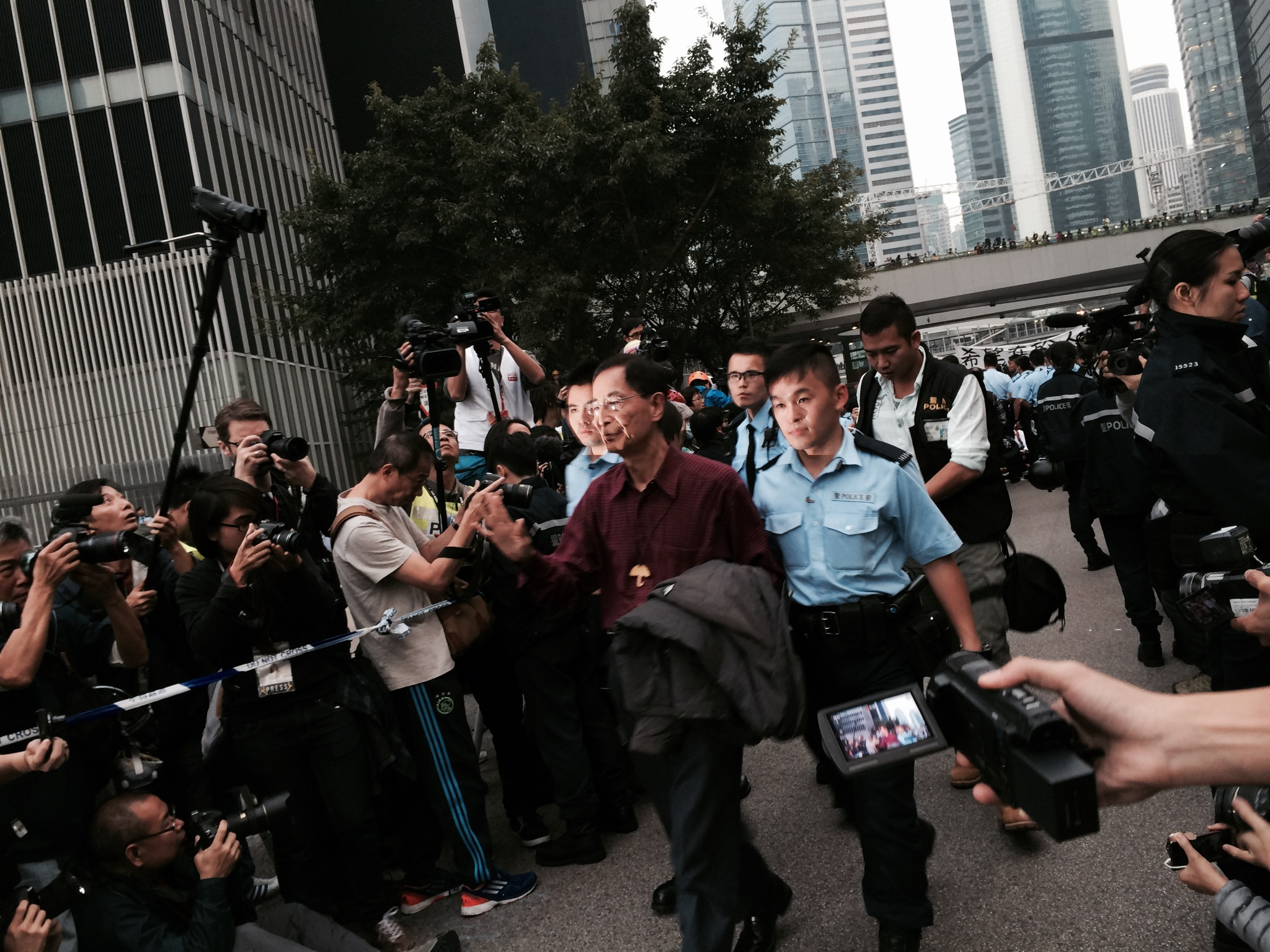
Martin Lee being arrested on the last day of the 2014 Hong Kong protests

Martin Lee actively lobbied in the West with former Chief Secretary for Administration and Hong Kong 2020 convenor Anson Chan for the support in the Hong Kong's democracy movement during the debate on the 2017/2020 electoral reform in 2014. The duo went to the United States and met Joe Biden, US vice-president, Nancy Pelosi, minority leader of the House of Representatives, and members of the Congressional-Executive Commission on China and spoke out against Beijing increasing control over Hong Kong and their fear of only candidates picked by Beijing would be allowed to take part in the 2017 Chief Executive election. In July 2014, Martin Lee and Anson Chan visited the United Kingdom and met with Deputy Prime Minister and the leader of the Liberal Democrats Nick Clegg and attended a Foreign Affairs Select Committee hearing, speaking out that they were "concerned that neither of the two signatories to the Joint Declaration – that is, China and Britain – is adequately fulfilling their respective responsibilities on the terms of this internationally binding treaty." Liu Xiaoming, Chinese ambassador to Britain, described Martin Lee and Anson Chan as "bent on undermining the stability of Hong Kong".

In the massive pro-democracy Occupy protests from October to December 2014, he was among the pro-democracy activists staging a final sit-in and arrested, putting an end to a 75-day street occupation.

=== Small House Policy ===
In December 2018, Lee represented Kwok Cheuk-kin and Hendrick Lui Chi-hang in an attempt to repeal the Small House Policy, a policy which Lee said discriminates against the majority of people in Hong Kong by discriminating based on descent and gender.

In his arguments, Lee said that Qing dynasty laws did not forbid women or outsiders to buy land in the New Territories. Lee mentioned that the policy for villagers to build homes without paying land fees was only implemented after the British began to rule the New Territories in 1898, and that before then, there was no mention of such a policy under Qing dynasty rule. Therefore, Lee said that the right for male villagers to build homes without paying land fees are based on British policies and were never part of the indigenous traditions that the Basic Law protects under Article 40, which does not specifically mention small houses and only says "The lawful traditional rights and interests of the indigenous inhabitants of the 'New Territories' shall be protected by the Hong Kong Special Administrative Region."

Finally, Lee also argued that the policy is based on a person's descent and sex (women are excluded), which is "unconstitutional" as it was against Basic Law Article 25, which states "All Hong Kong residents shall be equal before the law."

In response, Kenneth Lau Ip-keung of the Heung Yee Kuk, an organization that supports the small house policy, said that villagers "firmly believe" that the small house policy is protected under Article 40.

=== Short arrest ===
On 18 April 2020, Martin Lee was arrested as one of 15 Hong Kong high-profile democracy figures, on suspicion of organizing, publicizing or taking part in several unauthorized assemblies between August and October 2019 in the course of the 2019–20 Hong Kong protests. Following protocol, the police statement did not disclose the names of the accused. He was freed the same day on bail. After, Martin Lee said that he was arrested for the first time in his life but has no regrets and is proud of his democratic work: "Over the months and years, I've felt bad to see so many outstanding youngsters being arrested and prosecuted, but I was not charged. Now I've finally become a defendant. I feel proud that I have a chance to walk this path of democracy together with them."

On 1 April 2021, district judge Amanda Jane Woodcock (胡雅文) convicted Martin Lee of "holding an unauthorised assembly". On 16 April, Lee received a sentence of 11 months in jail, suspended for 24 months, for his part in the 2019 unauthorised assemblies.

On 12 April 2024 Martin Lee (then aged 86) received from the Hong Kong Court of Final Appeal a suspended sentence following conviction for taking part in an unauthorised procession in August 2019. The appeal generated considerable adverse publicity for Lord Neuberger (former President of the UK Supreme Court) for his participation in the decision.

On 27 December 2024, the Hong Kong Government stripped Lee of his title as a Justice of the Peace.

=== National Security Law ===
Lee stopped his public activism as a result of the Hong Kong National Security Law which went into effect on 1 July 2020. He stopped granting interviews to media organisations.

== Recognition ==
Lee was nominated for the 2021 Nobel Peace Prize by multiple Norwegian members of parliament.

== Personal life ==
Lee is a devoted Roman Catholic and a close friend with Cardinal Joseph Zen.

Lee is married to Amelia Lee Fong Yee-ngor (方綺娥) and they have one son, Joseph Lee, also a barrister.

== See also ==
- Human rights in Hong Kong
- Liberal International
- Liberalism in Hong Kong
- List of graduates of University of Hong Kong
- Politics of Hong Kong

Legal offices
Preceded by Henry Litton	Chairman of Hong Kong Bar Association; 1980–1983	Succeeded by Henry Litton
Legislative Council of Hong Kong
New constituency	Member of Legislative Council; Representative for Legal; 1985–1991	Succeeded by Simon Ip
Preceded by Chan Ying-lun	Member of Legislative Council; Representative for Hong Kong Island East; 1991–1997; With: Man Sai-cheong (1991–1995)	Replaced by Provisional Legislative Council
New parliament	Member of Legislative Council; Representative for Hong Kong Island; 1998–2008	Succeeded by Tanya Chan
Political offices
Preceded by Selina Chow	Chairman of Hong Kong Consumer Council; 1988–1991	Succeeded by Professor Edward Chen
Party political offices
New political party	Chairman of United Democrats of Hong Kong; 1990–1994	Merged into Democratic Party
New political party	Chairman of Democratic Party; 1994–2002	Succeeded by Yeung Sum
