= Dennis Kwok =

Former Hong Kong politician

- 郭榮鏗
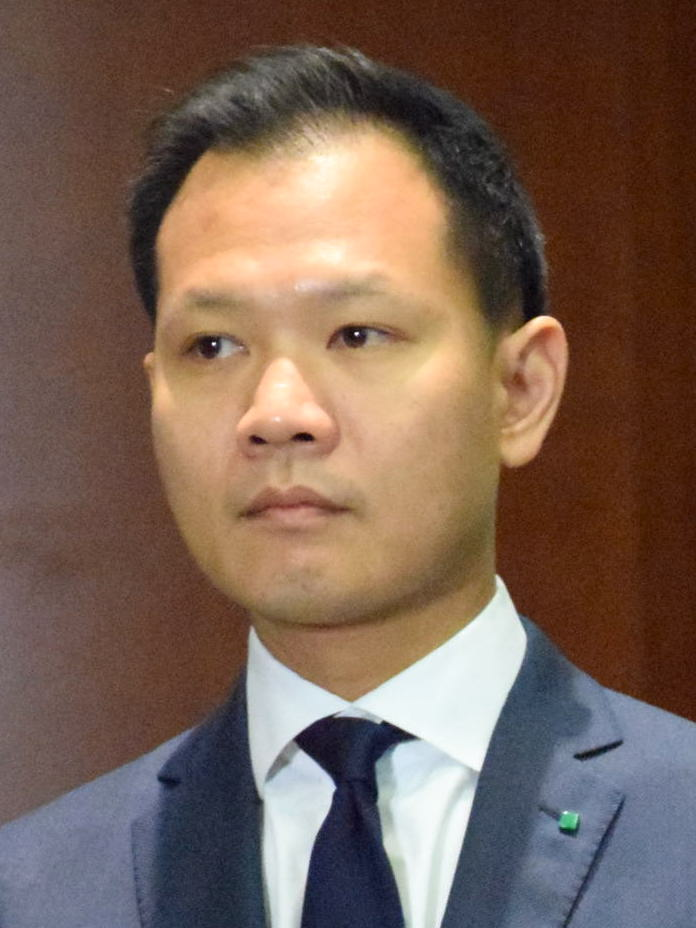
- Dennis Kwok in 2016

Member of the Legislative Council
- In office 1 October 2012 – 11 November 2020
- Preceded by: Margaret Ng
- Succeeded by: Ambrose Lam (2022)
- Constituency: Legal

Personal details
- Born: 15 April 1978 (age 48) Edmonton, Alberta, Canada
- Party: Civic Party; Professional Commons
- Spouse: Leslie Andrea Wong (m. 2007)
- Children: 2
- Education: La Salle Primary School; Rugby School; King's College London (LL.B); University of Hong Kong (PCLL)
- Occupation: Barrister

Dennis Kwok Wing-hang
- Traditional Chinese: 郭榮鏗
- Simplified Chinese: 郭荣铿
Transcriptions
Standard Mandarin
- Hanyu Pinyin: Guō Róngkēng
Yue: Cantonese
- Yale Romanization: Gwok Wìhng-hāng
- Jyutping: Gwok3 Wing4-hang1

Dennis Kwok Wing-hang (Chinese: 郭榮鏗; born 15 April 1978) is a Canadian lawyer and former Hong Kong politician who represented the legal constituency in the Hong Kong Legislative Council from 2012 to 2020. He is a founding member of Civic Party.

Once the Deputy Chairman of the House Committee, Kwok was accused of delaying the legislature proceedings. He was disqualified from the Legislative Council on 11 November 2020, along with three other lawmakers of the pan-democratic camp, by the Chinese Government on request of the Hong Kong government. A mass resignation of pan-democrats the same day left the Legislative Council without a substantial opposition. Later that month, Kwok announced his resignation from politics and left Hong Kong. In April 2021, it was reported that he had moved to Canada and later settled in the United States.

Kwok was charged with collusion and an arrest warrant with a HK$1 million bounty was issued by the Hong Kong Police in July 2023.

== Early career ==
Kwok was educated at King's College London (LLB, 1999) and the University of Hong Kong (PCLL). He was admitted as a solicitor in the High Court of Hong Kong in 2002 and to the Roll of Solicitors of England and Wales in 2003.

He subsequently left his practice as a solicitor to join the Bar in 2006 with a focus in civil and public administrative law. In 2008, he served on the Bar Council.

== Political career ==
In 2006, Kwok was elected as an Election Committee Member for the Legal Functional Constituency, and was re-elected in 2011.

In 2007, he co-founded The Professional Commons, a public policy think-tank, and in 2008, he joined the Citizens Commission for Constitutional Development headed by the former Chief Secretary, Mrs. Anson Chan.

He took part in the 2011 District Council Election (South Horizons East constituency) but he was defeated.

In 2012, he succeeded Margaret Ng and won the seat of Legal functional constituency in Legislative Council. He later served as Deputy Chairman of the House Committee and the Panel on Administration of Justice and Legal Services.

=== Political strategy ===
On assuming office as the legal-sector lawmaker, Kwok expressed support for the use of filibustering tactics by the pro-democracy camp, arguing that "the existing rules of procedure already make it sufficiently difficult for members to continue to filibuster without limitation". He said he would challenge any effort by the pro-government camp to inhibit the practice.

From October 2019 to May 2020, while Kwok was Deputy Chairman of Legco's House Committee, no election for the vacant post of its Chairman took place, for which Kwok was accused by the Hong Kong and Macau Affairs Office and other pro-government voices of misconduct by paralysing Legco through filibustering tactics. In April 2020, pro-establishment lawmakers argued that Dennis Kwok was "no longer fit" to preside over sessions as his continued filibustering tactics had left multiple pieces of legislation in limbo.

On 15 May 2020, Legco president Andrew Leung removed Kwok from the post of committee Deputy Chairman and imposed Finance Committee chair Chan Kin-por in his place.

The move was vociferously opposed by democratic members, and led to shouting and scuffles in the chamber, during which eleven opposition lawmakers were ejected. The following week, Starry Lee was re-elected Chair, and the committee proceeded with addressing a backlog of bills for review.

=== Disqualification and dismissal ===
Five weeks ahead of the (subsequently postponed) 2020 Hong Kong Legislative Council Election, on 30 July 2020, as Kwok prepared to defend his seat, the government stated that he was among a dozen pro-democracy candidates whose nominations were 'invalid', under an opaque process in which, nominally, civil servants – returning officers – assess whether, for instance, a candidate had objected to the enactment of the national security law, or was sincere in statements made disavowing separatism. On 11 November 2020, following a decision by the Standing Committee of the National People's Congress, Kwok was disqualified from Legislative Council along with Alvin Yeung, Kwok Ka-ki and Kenneth Leung. Hours later, 15 of their pro-democracy colleagues resigned from office in protest.

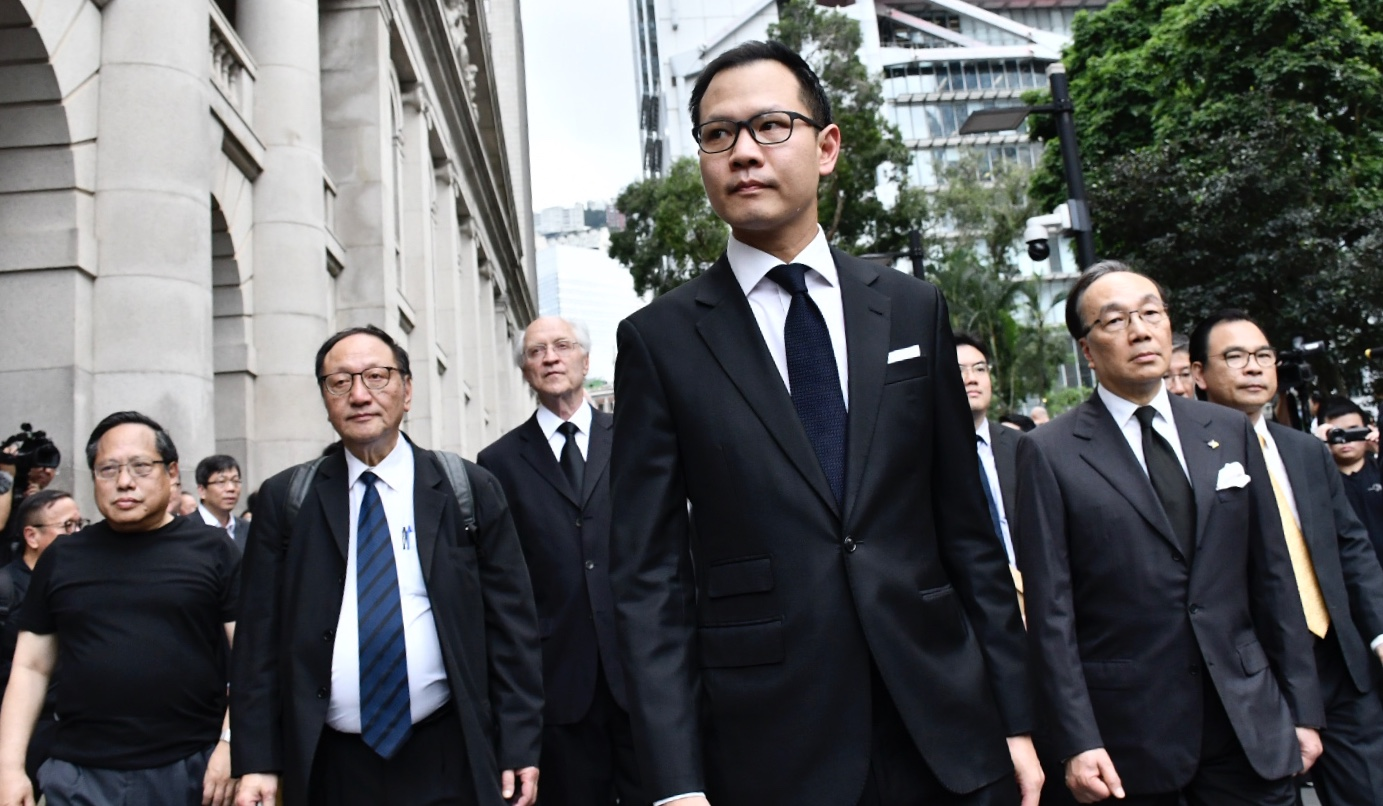
Dennis Kwok leading a 2019 protest in Hong Kong along with other members of the Civic Party.

Kwok announced on 21 November that he was resigning from politics after being disqualified. As reasons for his step, he cited his perception of being unable to advance his career in politics, as well as family reasons. He was reported in April 2021 to have moved to Canada. That same month, he announced that he had quit the Civic Party.

== Legal and academic career ==
Following his departure from Hong Kong, in August 2021 Kwok was named as a Distinguished Scholar in the Asian Studies Program of Georgetown University’s School of Foreign Service. He also became a Senior Research Fellow at Harvard University's Kennedy School.

Kwok joined with three other lawyers in May 2022 to form a legal practice in the United States. The firm, Elliott Kwok Levine & Jaroslaw LLP, focuses on commercial litigation and international arbitration, white-collar criminal defense, regulatory counseling, China-related corporate advisory work, international human rights, and antitrust.

== Citizenship ==
Kwok renounced his Canadian citizenship in 2012 to become a Legco member. In April 2021, when his move to Canada had become public, it was also reported that he sought to regain Canadian citizenship. In 2024, the Hong Kong government revoked his HKSAR passport under the Article 23 Legislation, thus losing his Chinese citizenship and permanent residential rights in Hong Kong.

== Awards ==
- Award for Distinction in International Law and Affairs from the New York State Bar Association’s International Section.
- Rule of Law Award from the U.K.’s Commonwealth Law Association.

== Publications ==
- Kwok, Dennis; Patterson, Johnny (5 April 2022). "Look to Hong Kong, Not Ukraine, For Signals About China's Taiwan Plans". The Diplomat.
- Kwok, Dennis; Goodman, Sam (23 March 2022). "Nickel Short Saga Raises Questions About China's Interference in International Markets". The Diplomat.
- Kwok, Dennis; Patterson, Johnny (21 March 2022). "Hong Kong Is The Canary In The Coalmine: Why We Must Take Xi Jinping's Words Seriously When It Comes To Taiwan". Taiwan Insight. University of Nottingham.
- Kwok, Dennis; Mok, Charles (8 December 2021). "Hong Kong Listing Means More Trouble for Didi". The Wall Street Journal.
- Mok, Charles; Kwok, Dennis (2 November 2021). "China's Neo-Nationalism Poses Risks for International Businesses". The Diplomat.
- Kwok, Dennis; Patterson, Johnny (22 September 2021). "Xi Jinping Makes China a Dangerous Place for Investment". The Wall Street Journal.

== See also ==
Legislative Council of Hong Kong
Preceded by Margaret Ng	Member of Legislative Council; Representative for Legal; 2012–2020	Succeeded by Ambrose Lam
