= Simon Ip =

Simon Ip Sik-on GBS, CBE, JP
- 葉錫安

Member of the Legislative Council
- In office 9 October 1991 – 31 July 1995
- Preceded by: Martin Lee
- Succeeded by: Margaret Ng
- Constituency: Legal

Personal details
- Born: 10 September 1948 (age 78) Hong Kong
- Spouse: Shelia Mary Wells
- Children: 2
- Education: The College of Law
- Occupation: Solicitor and Notary Public

Simon Ip
- Traditional Chinese: 葉錫安
- Simplified Chinese: 叶锡安
Transcriptions
Standard Mandarin
- Hanyu Pinyin: Yè Xī'ān
Yue: Cantonese
- Yale Romanization: Yihp Sīk ōn
- Jyutping: Jip^{6} Sek^{3} on^{1}

Simon Ip Sik-on, GBS CBE JP (born 10 September 1948) was the member of the Legislative Council of Hong Kong (1991—1995) for the Legal functional constituency. He was educated at St Stephen's Church School, Hong Kong, and at the Licensed Victuallers' School and The College of Law in England. Ip adopted a conservative interpretation of the Basic Law and acknowledged the Chinese overlordship of the Hong Kong judiciary.

== Legal career ==
Ip started working in law as a law clerk in London in the 1960s for five years. In 1972, he returned to British Hong Kong to work as a solicitor for Johnson Stokes & Master. Within three years of joining, he had become the firm's chairman and a partner. He specialised his practice in commercial law. Whilst in the Legislative Council, he drafted the bill for the creation of the Hong Kong Court of Final Appeal for after the handover of Hong Kong to China. In 2009, he was awarded an honourary doctorate of law by the City University of Hong Kong.

== Political career ==
Ip was elected to the Legislative Council in the Legal functional constituency in 1991, succeeding Martin Lee. He played a role during the 1994 Hong Kong electoral reform. The Governor of Hong Kong, Chris Patten had proposed reforms to bring in more elected seats to the Legislative Council. This was opposed by the pro-Beijing camp and Hong Kong conservative groups. The Liberal Party's Allen Lee brought in a wrecking amendment to attempt to stop it. During over 12 hours of debate, the amendment was defeated 29-28, with the abstention of Ip being viewed as the significant factor that led to the amendment failing and the reforms passing.

Ip decided not to contest the 1995 Hong Kong legislative election on the grounds that he wanted to focus more time as the chairman of the Governing Council of the Hong Kong Institute of Education. He denied media allegations that the move was so that the chairman of the Law Society, Donald Yap could gain a seat. Ip was replaced by Margaret Ng in the Legal seat. Ip was awarded a CBE in the final British honours list for Hong Kong prior to the handover to China.

Legal offices
Preceded by Brian Tisdall	President of Law Society of Hong Kong; 1987–1989	Succeeded by Alfred Donald Yap
Legislative Council of Hong Kong
Preceded by Martin Lee	Member of Legislative Council; Representative for Legal; 1991–1995	Succeeded by Margaret Ng
Sporting positions
Preceded by Thomas Brian Stevenson	Chairman of the Hong Kong Jockey Club; 2014–present	Incumbent
