= Margaret Ng =

Hong Kong politician

Margaret Ng Ngoi-yee
- 吳靄儀
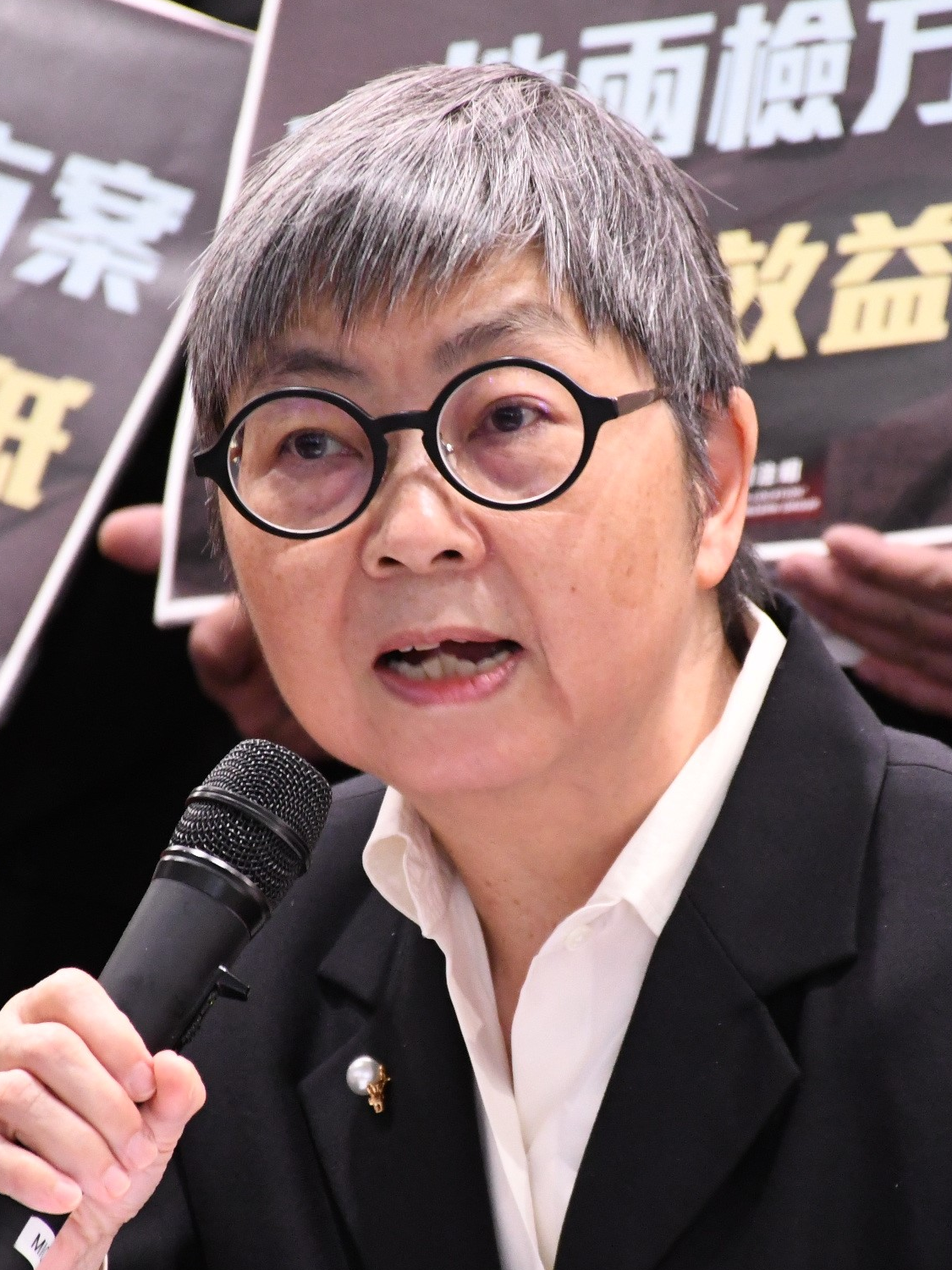

Member of the Legislative Council of Hong Kong
- In office 1 July 1998 – 30 September 2012
- Preceded by: New parliament
- Succeeded by: Dennis Kwok
- Constituency: Legal
- In office 11 October 1995 – 30 June 1997
- Preceded by: Simon Ip
- Succeeded by: Replaced by Provisional Legislative Council
- Constituency: Legal

Personal details
- Born: 25 January 1948 (age 78) Tai Wai, New Territories, British Hong Kong
- Party: Civic Party (2006-2024)
- Education: Tai Po Government Primary School; St Paul's Convent School
- Alma mater: University of Hong Kong (BA, MA, P.C.LL.); University of Cambridge (BA); Boston University (PhD)
- Occupation: Barrister

Margaret Ng
- Traditional Chinese: 吳靄儀
- Simplified Chinese: 吴霭仪
Transcriptions
Standard Mandarin
- Hanyu Pinyin: Wú Ǎiyí
Yue: Cantonese
- Yale Romanization: Ǹgh Ói yìh
- Jyutping: Ng^{4} Oi^{2} ji^{4}

Margaret Ng Ngoi-yee (Chinese: 吳靄儀; born 25 January 1948) is a politician, barrister, writer and columnist in Hong Kong. She was a member of the Legislative Council of Hong Kong from 1995 to 2012.

== Biography ==
Before entering the legal profession, Margaret Ng worked at the University of Hong Kong and Chase Manhattan Bank (now JP Morgan Chase). She also held senior positions in journalism, serving as publisher and deputy editor-in-chief of the Ming Pao newspaper; and as a columnist for South China Morning Post.

Besides being a lawyer and journalist, Ng is also an accomplished expert in the fields of philosophy and literature. She has written several volumes of critical studies on the wuxia novels of Jin Yong and earned her Doctor of Philosophy degree from Boston University.

She appeared in a BBC documentary, The Last Governor, which followed Chris Patten and the last years of British rule in Hong Kong.

Like many politicians from the Pan-democrat camp, Ng is denied entry into the Mainland. On 12 September 1999, she was barred travel there to attend a conference on China's constitution.

She was a former director at Stand News and a former Civic Party lawmaker at Legislative Council of Hong Kong.

== Arrests ==
On 18 April 2020, Ng was arrested as one of 15 Hong Kong high-profile democracy figures, on suspicion of organizing, publicizing or taking part in several unauthorized assemblies between August and October 2019 in the course of the anti-extradition bill protests. Following protocol, the police statement did not disclose the names of the accused. On 16 April 2021, she was sentenced to 12 months' imprisonment suspended for 24 months. On 12 April 2024, Ng received from the Hong Kong Court of Final Appeal a suspended sentence following conviction for taking part in an unauthorised procession in August 2019. The decision generated considerable adverse publicity for Lord Neuberger (former President of the UK Supreme Court) for his participation in the decision.

On 29 December 2021, Ng and six other people linked to Stand News were arrested on suspicion of breaching a colonial-era law covering conspiracy to print or distribute seditious materials that were supposedly published at the pro-democracy outlet. She was released on bail next day together with the five of the detained.

== Academic history ==
- B.A., University of Hong Kong (HKU)
- M.A., University of Hong Kong (HKU)
- PhD, Boston University (1976) (Three theories of despair: the Confucian, the Catholic and the Freudian)
- B.A. (Law), University of Cambridge
- Postgraduate Certificate in Laws, University of Hong Kong (HKU)

== See also ==
- List of graduates of University of Hong Kong

Legislative Council of Hong Kong
Preceded by Simon Ip	Member of Legislative Council; Representative for Legal; 1995–1997	Replaced by Provisional Legislative Council
New parliament	Member of Legislative Council; Representative for Legal; 1998–2012	Succeeded by Dennis Kwok
