= Kim Cham =

Kim Cham CBE, JP
- 湛佑森

Member of the Legislative Council
- In office 4 October 1984 – 25 August 1988
- Appointed by: Sir Edward Youde

Personal details
- Born: 16 April 1946 (age 80) Hong Kong
- Spouse: Winnie Ho Woon-kwan
- Children: 2
- Education: St. Paul's Co-educational College; University of Hong Kong (BA); Queen's University (MBA); University of Bath (PhD); Harvard Business School; University of New England
- Occupation: Company director

Kim Cham Yau-sum JP (born 16 April 1946, Hong Kong) is a Hong Kong businessman, accountant and politician.

He studied at the St. Paul's Co-Educational College and graduated from the University of Hong Kong with bachelor's degree in Economics in 1968. He continued his master's degree at the Queen's University in Canada and later the doctoral degree at the University of Bath in England. He also obtained a certificate in Business Education at the Harvard Business School and a diploma in financial management at the University of New England in Australia.

He is the fellow of the British Institute of Management, Institute of Canadian Bankers (FICB), associate member of the Australian Society of Accountants and Hong Kong Society of Accountants.

He came to politics when he was appointed as a member of the Urban Council. He was later appointed to the Legislative Council in 1984 by Governor Edward Youde. He served as the chairman of the Hong Kong Future Exchanges.
