= Law Society of Hong Kong =

Professional association for solicitors in Hong Kong

The Law Society of Hong Kong
- 香港律師會
- Formation: 1907
- Legal status: Company limited by guarantee
- Headquarters: 26/F, The Center, 99 Queen's Road Central, Central, Hong Kong
- Region served: Hong Kong
- President: Roden Tong
- Budget: HK$151 Million (2024)
- Website: hklawsoc.org.hk

Law Society of Hong Kong
- Traditional Chinese: 香港律師會
- Simplified Chinese: 香港律师会
Transcriptions
Standard Mandarin
- Hanyu Pinyin: Xiānggǎng Lǜshī Huì
Yue: Cantonese
- Yale Romanization: Hēung góng leuht sī wúi
- Jyutping: Hoeng1 gong2 loet6 si1 wui2

The Law Society of Hong Kong (Chinese: 香港律師會) is the professional association and law society for solicitors in Hong Kong, established in 1907. The Law Society of Hong Kong is responsible for the classification and qualification of solicitors in Hong Kong. According to Hong Kong law, all Hong Kong practising solicitors must be members of the Society.

As of 2022, the Law Society is headed by President Roden Tong (湯文龍) and is located on the third floor of Wing On House in Central.

== History ==
=== Early roots ===
The Law Society's history stretches back to 28 October 1854, when solicitor William Gaskell, addressing the Supreme Court, sought "the countenance and sanction of the acting Chief Justice [Paul Sterling] for the formation of a law society".

Records of a society between 1854 and 1858 are scant, but it appeared again in June 1858, when the law society petitioned Chief Justice John Walter Hulme and Governor John Bowring to oppose a fusion of the legal profession between solicitors and barristers.

=== Incorporation ===
The Law Society was incorporated on 8 April 1907 as a company limited by guarantee, and was then known as "The Incorporated Law Society of Hong Kong". The present name was adopted in 1969.

In 2014, the Society underwent its first-ever motion of no confidence in its president over his declared support for the white paper published by the PRC on the city's autonomy in which patriotism was a prerequisite for the territory's judges. Ambrose Lam's declaration appeared to be at odds with sentiment of its members, a thousand of whom marched in response to the white paper. Over 100 petitioners objected to Lam's politicisation of the Law Society, requesting that Lam withdraw his comments and reassert support for judicial independence. The tabler of the no confidence vote had expected Lam to be able to call on a large reservoir of proxy votes in his defence. At a meeting called for 14 August 2014, Lam suffered a surprising defeat in the non-binding vote calling for him to resign. The motion was carried by 2,392 votes to 1,478, with almost half its members voting in person or by proxy. There had been complaints of members receiving external pressure from Chinese companies, the central government Liaison Office, and members of the CPPCC National Committee. Lam resigned on 19 August 2014, with neither an apology nor a retraction.

== President ==
On 5 January 2022, Carrie Lam announced new warnings and restrictions against social gathering due to potential COVID-19 outbreaks. One day later, it was discovered that president Chan Chak-ming attended a birthday party hosted by Witman Hung Wai-man, with 222 guests. At least one guest tested positive with COVID-19, causing many guests to be quarantined.

In November 2022, president Chan Chak-ming said that he and 3 vice-presidents recently went overseas to dispel ideas that "there is no judicial independence, fair trials and free speech" in Hong Kong.

In January 2023, after the NPCSC gave the Chief Executive power to ban foreign lawyers in response to Jimmy Lai attempting to hire Tim Owen, Chan said the NPCSC's decision was a "good example" of the government's commitment to implementing One Country, Two Systems.

== Structure ==
The Society is divided into two bodies:

- The Council – the governing body of the Society and consists of 20 members with 2 vice-presidents and 1 president.
- The Secretariat – the body responsible for the standing committees within the Society and has around 100 staff.

== Profile of the profession ==
As of 30 November 2025, the Law Society regulates 11,938 solicitors in Hong Kong with a current practising certificate.

=== Structure of the profession ===
- 8,162 solicitors were in private practice in 929 firms.
- Of these firms:
  - 45% were sole practitioners.
  - 43% were firms with 2 to 5 partners.
  - 76 were limited liability partnerships formed pursuant to the Legal Practitioners Ordinance.

=== Foreign lawyers ===
- 1,653 registered foreign lawyers in Hong Kong coming from 31 jurisdictions.

=== Gender ===
- Of all practising solicitors, 48% were male and 52% were female.

== Finance ==
In 2006, the Society's income was HK$86 million, HK$46.26 million being raised through annual practising certificate fees and membership subscriptions.

The Society had an annual income budget of HK$80.6 million for 2007. In 2007, the Society's income was HK$91.6 million, HK$47.7 million being raised through annual practising certificate fees and membership subscriptions.

In 2017, the Society generated an income of HK$103 million, out of which HK$47 million was raised through annual practising certificate fees. The annual practising certificate fee in 2017 was HK$5,000 and membership fee was HK$800.

As of January 2026, the fee for a practising certificate was HK$6,500 and the fee for membership subscription was HK$2,500.

== List of presidents ==
- 1950–51: C. Y. Kwan
- 1955–56: G. S. Ford
- 1957–58: K. Y. Kan
- 1959–60: P. C. Woo
- 1962–6?: Peter A. L. Vine
- 1969–71: T. S. Lo
- 1971–7?: Brian Mcelney
- 1973–75: Peter C. Wong
- 1975–76: I. R. A. MacCallum
- 1976–77: K. L. Mak
- 1977–79: C. H. Wong
- 1979–81: Edmund Cheung
- 1981–83: P. S. Wan
- 1983–84: T. S. Tong
- 1984–85: Tim Freshwater
- 1985–87: Brian Tisdall
- 1987–89: Simon Ip
- 1989–92: Alfred Donald Yap
- 1992–93: Ambrose Lau
- 1993–96: Roderick Woo
- 1996–97: Christopher Chan
- 1997–2000: Anthony Chow
- 2000–02: Herbert Tsoi
- 2002–04: S. H. Ip
- 2004–05: Michael Lintern-Smith
- 2005–07: Peter C. L. Lo
- 2007–09: Lester Huang
- 2009–11: Huen Wong
- 2011–12: Junius Ho
- 2012–13: Dieter Yih
- 2013–14: Ambrose Lam
- 2014–16: Stephen Hung
- 2016–18: Thomas So
- 2018–21: Melissa K. Pang
- 2021–24: C. M. Chan
- 2024-Incumbent: Roden Tong

== See also ==
- Hong Kong Bar Association
- The Law Society
- The Incorporated Law Society of Northern Ireland
- The Law Society of Scotland
- Law Society of Singapore
- The Law Society of Upper Canada
- Postgraduate Certificate in Laws
