= Peter C. Wong =

Hong Kong solicitor and politician

Peter C Wong 王澤長 CBE, JP

Unofficial Member of the Executive Council
- In office 1 September 1986 – 31 August 1988
- Appointed by: Sir Murray MacLehose
- Preceded by: Sir Oswald Cheung
- Succeeded by: Rosanna Wong

Unofficial Member of the Legislative Council
- In office 6 October 1976 – 25 August 1988
- Appointed by: Sir Murray MacLehose; Sir Edward Youde

Personal details
- Born: 19 September 1922 Hong Kong
- Died: 22 December 1989 (aged 67) Happy Valley, Hong Kong
- Spouse: Anna
- Education: University of Hong Kong (BA)
- Occupation: Solicitor; Notary Public

Peter Chak-cheong Wong, CBE, JP (19 September 1922 – 22 September 1989) was a member of the Executive Council and Legislative Council of Hong Kong and president of the Law Society of Hong Kong. Born in Hong Kong, Wong attended the University of Hong Kong and graduated with bachelor's degree in 1950. He became a solicitor and a fellow of the British Institute of Management. He was the president of the Law Society between 1973 and 1975. He was appointed by Governor Murray MacLehose to the Legislative Council when the council was reformed and extended its membership from 15 to 22 unofficial members. He was subsequently the member of the Executive Council from 1978 to 1983.
