= 1985 Hong Kong electoral reform =

The 1985 Hong Kong electoral reform introduced the first ever indirect election to the colonial legislature during the last years of the British colonial rule in Hong Kong. The reform proposals was first carried out in the Green Paper: the Further Development of Representative Government in Hong Kong in July 1984 right before the Sino-British Joint Declaration in December. The reform laid the foundation of the representative democracy in Hong Kong which developed throughout the last years of the colonial rule and succeeded by the democratic development in Hong Kong after the handover of Hong Kong in 1997.

== Background ==
The Green Paper: the Further Development of Representative Government in Hong Kong was published in July 1984, before the Sino-British negotiations over the sovereignty of Hong Kong were concluded, and marked the intention of first large-scale constitutional reform in the colonial history. The 1980 Green Paper stated the continual evolution of the government system including the Executive Council and the Legislative Council. The formation of the District Boards and the first direct election in 1982 were followed by the 1980 Green Paper. In 1983 the membership of the Urban Council was increased to 30, half of whom were elected from direct constituencies on the further extended franchises.

A further democratic reform was considered in the Green Paper of 1984 published in July, months before the Sino-British Joint Declaration was signed which the United Kingdom and the People's Republic of China governments agreed on handing over Hong Kong from British to Chinese rule in 1997.

== Green Paper ==
The Green Paper: the Further Development of Representative Government in Hong Kong was published by the Hong Kong government in July 1984 proposed a further representative government. The main aims of the proposals were:

1. to develop progressively a system of government, the authority for which is firmly rooted in Hong Kong, which is able to represent authoritatively the views of the people of Hong Kong, and which is more directly accountable to the people of Hong Kong;
2. to build this system on our existing institution, which have served Hong Kong well, and as far as possible, to preserve their best features, including the maintenance of the well established practice of government by consensus; and
3. to allow for further development if that should be the wish of the community.

The main issues for consideration were the role, functions or composition of the Legislative Council, the Executive Council and the position of the Governor.

=== Legislative Council ===
The Green Paper suggested the introduction of the indirect election in two stages in 1985 and 1988 to the unofficial members of the Legislative Council (LegCo) by an electoral college consisting of Members of the Urban Council of Hong Kong, the new Regional Council to be established in 1986, and District Boards and functional groups or functional constituencies. It also suggested the length of term for the unofficial members should be three years. Furthermore, the number of the official members and appointed unofficial members was considered to be gradually reduced as the number of the indirect elected unofficial members was increased.

Proposed Changes to LegCo Composition
	1985	1988	1991
Elected by Electoral College	6	12	14/20
Elected by Functional Constituencies	12	8	14/20
Appointed by Governor	23	16	12/0
Official Members	13	10	10

The Green Paper indicated a review to consider the possibility of introducing direct election on a constituency basis or a single territory-wide list.

=== Executive Council ===
The Green Paper suggested the introduction of a representative element into the Executive Council (ExCo) by proposing an indirect election of the unofficial members of the Executive Council by the unofficial members of the Legislative Council. The Green Paper proposed that 4 unofficial members of the Executive Council were to be elected by LegCo in 1988, increasing to 8 elected unofficial members in 1991.

Proposed Changes to ExCo Composition
	1985	1988	1991
Elected by LegCo	0	4	8
Appointed by Governor	12	8	2
Ex Officio Members	4	4	4

=== Governor ===
The Green Paper suggested the Governor's power to appoint members of the Executive and Legislative Councils to be limited. It also suggested Governor to cease to be the President of the Legislative Council. The power of the Governor to oppose to the advice of the Executive Council was also considered to be removed. The method of selecting the Governor was also mentioned for consideration, with suggestions that the Governor be selected for appointment by the Queen through election by a college composed of all Unofficial Members of the Executive and Legislative Councils.

== White Paper ==
A two-month period was allowed for public consultation on the Green Paper proposals. In addition to over 360 written submission from various organizations, groups and individuals. Many meetings and public discussions were attended by government officers, several surveys of public opinion were carried out and the public was generally in favour of the aims of the Green Paper. Comments were received from many members of District Boards, Area Committees and Mutual Aid Committees. Urban Councillors expressed their views in an open debate on 4 and 6 September 1984, which was followed up by a Resolution from the Standing Committee of the Whole Council on 27 September 1984. and Unofficial Members of the Legislative Council commented on the proposals during the debate in the Legislative Council on 2 August 1984.

=== General reactions ===
The White Paper: the Further Development of Representative Government in Hong Kong was published in November 1984, summing up the public responses to the constitutional reform proposal. The ideas of an electoral college and functional constituencies for the election of the unofficial members of the Legislative Council were adopted. However, the government concluded that "there was little evidence of support in public comment on the Green Paper for any move towards direct elections in 1985."

=== Executive Council ===
There was much less comment on the Executive Council proposals than on the Legislative Council. It was not proposed to make any changes affecting the Executive Council in 1985. The idea of replacing the Governor as President of the Legislative Council by an elected Presiding Officer was generally received, but the general view was in favour of making no significant changes in the position of the Governor during the next few years. The White Paper stated that proposals on the functioning of unofficial members as a ministerial system and the position of the Governor were subject to review in 1987.

=== Electoral College of LegCo ===
Under the White Paper proposals, the electoral college comprised all members of the District Boards, the Urban Council and the new Regional Council. The college would elect 12 Unofficial members to the Legislative Council in September 1985. In order to achieve a more balanced and adequate representation the District Boards would be grouped into ten geographical constituencies each representing approximately 500,000 people. The remaining two seats would be provided by the two special constituencies formed respectively by members of the Urban Council and the Regional Council. The interests of the Heung Yee Kuk would be represented through the Regional Council.

=== Functional Constituencies of LegCo ===
Nine functional constituencies representing economic and professional sectors of the Hong Kong society would return an overall total of 12 unofficial members to the Legislative Council in the elections planned for September 1985. The commercial, industrial, and labour constituencies would each return two unofficial members to the Legislative Council. The remaining six constituencies would each return one Unofficial member.

=== Official Members of LegCo ===
The number of official members was reduced to 10 in conjunction with the introduction of elected members.

== Electoral Provisions Bill ==
The Legislative Council (Electoral Provisions) Bill 1985 was introduced into the Legislative Council in early 1985 and was passed on 3 April 1985 with the support of the unofficial members. The first Legislative Council elections, electing 24 unofficial members of LegCo, was postponed from July to September to allow enactment of the Electoral Provisions Bill and administrative arrangements be made.

Composition of the LegCo (1985–1988)
	1985
Elected by Electoral College	12
Elected by Functional Constituencies	12
Appointed by Governor	22
Ex Officio Members	10

== See also ==
- Democratic development in Hong Kong
- 1985 Hong Kong legislative election
