= Ho Kam-fai =

Ho Kam-Fai CBE, JP
- 何錦輝

Member of the Legislative Council
- In office 11 October 1978 – 25 August 1988
- Appointed by: Sir Murray MacLehose; Sir Edward Youde

Personal details
- Born: 10 June 1933 (age 93) Hong Kong
- Spouse: Christine Tse (Tse Yuk-Chun)
- Children: 3 (Joy, Edmond, Eugene)
- Education: University of Hong Kong; Columbia University (MSW, DSW)
- Occupation: Professor

Ho Kam-Fai CBE JP (Chinese: 何錦輝; born 10 June 1933) is a former member of the Legislative Council of Hong Kong.

Ho obtained a postgraduate diploma in Social Study at the University of Hong Kong and finished his master and doctoral degrees in Social Work at Columbia University. He taught at the Chinese University of Hong Kong, where he eventually became Director of the Department of Extramural Studies. He was appointed to the Legislative Council of Hong Kong in 1978 by Governor Murray MacLehose and served until 1988.

Ho was also the member of the Po Leung Kuk Advisory Board.
