= Fateh Muhammad v Commissioner of Registration =

- Court of Final Appeal
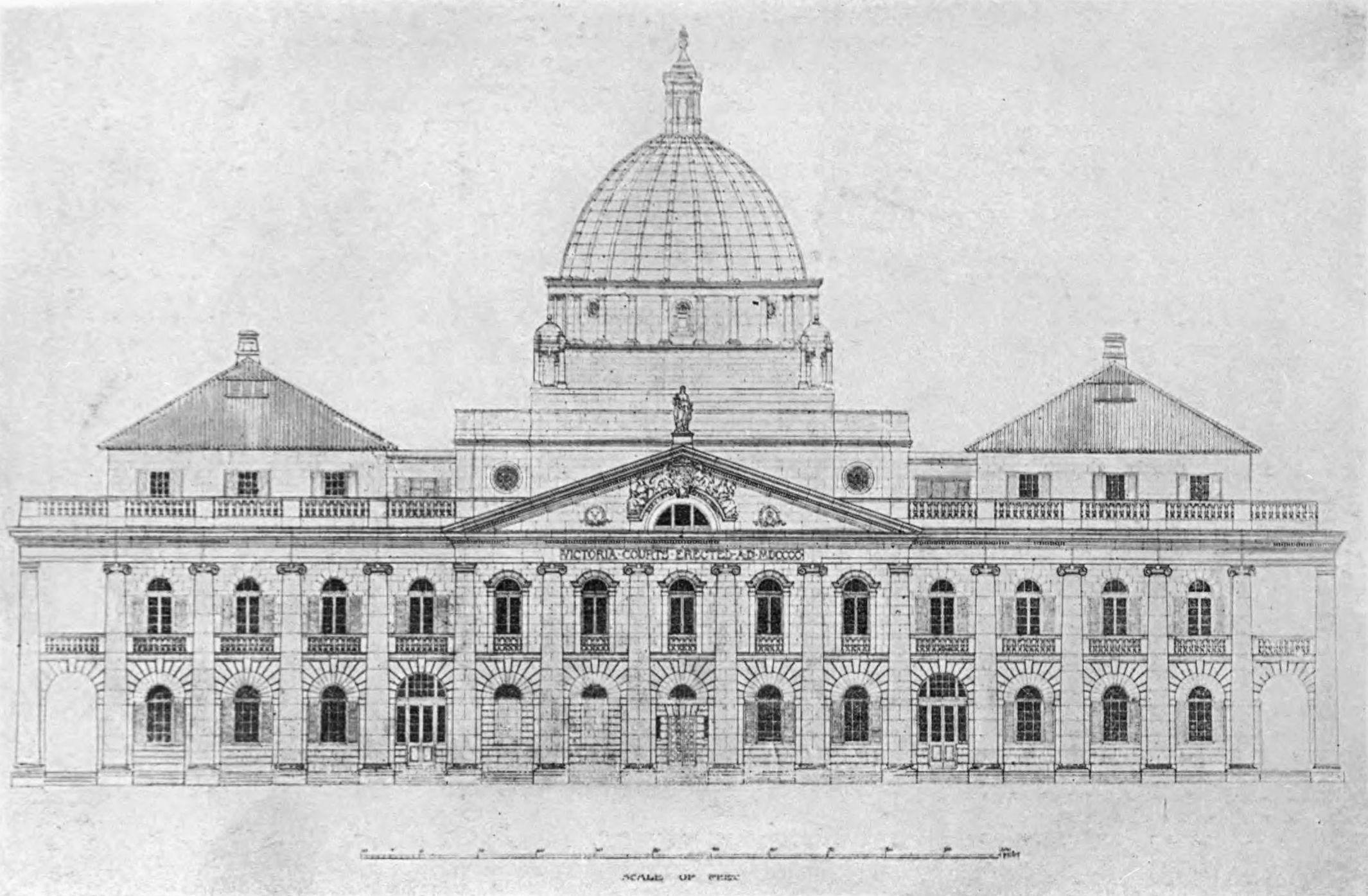
- Full case name: Fateh Muhammad v Commissioner of Registration and Registration of Persons Tribunal
- Citations: [2001] 2 HKLRD 659
- Transcript: Full text of judgment

Case history
- Prior actions: Commissioner for Registration v Registration of Persons Tribunal and Fateh Muhammad HCAL 40/1999; Commissioner for Registration v Registration of Persons Tribunal and Fateh Muhammad CACV 272/1999

Court membership
- Judges sitting: Andrew Li, Kemal Bokhary, Patrick Chan, Gerald Nazareth, and Anthony Mason

Fateh Muhammad v Commissioner of Registration and Registration of Persons Tribunal was a 2001 case in the Court of Final Appeal, Hong Kong, by a Pakistani migrant seeking the right of abode in Hong Kong. The case concerned provisions of the Immigration Ordinance requiring that a non-Chinese national's seven years of "ordinary residence" qualifying him to apply for permanent residence immediately precede his application. The unanimous opinion, written by Justice Kemal Bokhary (himself of Pakistani background), ruled that those provisions were not inconsistent with the Hong Kong Basic Law. The ruling in the case temporarily disqualified the appellant from applying for permanent residency, though he was expected to qualify again a few years later.

== Background ==
Fateh Muhammad was a Pakistani migrant who had resided in Hong Kong since 1962. He was sentenced to four years in prison in 1993 for conspiracy to utter forged banknotes. The Secretary for Security ordered that he be deported from Hong Kong upon completion of his sentence. Muhammad applied to the Director of Immigration for verification of eligibility for a Hong Kong permanent identity card; effectively, he sought to assert that he had the right of abode in Hong Kong and thus under Immigration Ordinance 2A(1)(c) could not be deported. The Director refused verification on the grounds that Muhammad had not been "ordinarily resident" in Hong Kong for the seven years immediately preceding his application for verification, because under IO 2(4)(b) time spent in prison is not considered "ordinarily resident".

== Legal proceedings ==
=== Tribunal and lower courts ===
Muhammad appealed the Director's decision to the Registration of Persons Tribunal on 4 August 1998, which on 29 January 1999 allowed his appeal, ordering that a permanent identity card be issued to him. In doing so, it stated that IO Schedule 1 Paragraph 1(4)(b), which imposed the requirement that the seven years of ordinary residence qualifying a non-Chinese national to apply for permanent residence immediately precede the application, contravened the Basic Law and should be struck down. (Note: The Tribunal did not address IO 2(4)(b); the Court of First Instance in Vallejos v Commissioner of Registration would strike down part of IO 2(4) as inconsistent with the Basic Law in 2011 but was later reversed by the Court of Final Appeal.) The Director withdrew the deportation order on 26 February 1999.

However, the Director also appealed to the Court of First Instance. Justice Brian Keith found the impugned provisions to be consistent with the Basic Law and made an order of certiorari quashing the Registration of Persons Tribunal's order that Muhammad be issued with a permanent identity card. Muhammad appealed to the Court of Appeal. Justices Simon Mayo, Robert Ribeiro, and Anthony Rogers on 19 April 2000 upheld the CFI's ruling. The CA applied a purposive approach to interpreting BL 24(2)(4), and concluded that the three requirements therein for a non-Chinese national to become a permanent resident (entered Hong Kong with a valid travel document; has ordinarily resided in Hong Kong for a continuous period of not less than 7 years; and has taken Hong Kong as his place of permanent residence) should be completed concurrently.

=== Court of Final Appeal ===
Muhammad appealed again to the Court of Final Appeal. His case was one of three CFA cases relating to the right of abode that year said to form part of a "constitutional crisis" in Hong Kong, the other two being Director of Immigration v Chong Fung Yuen (which ruled that Chinese nationals born in Hong Kong were entitled to the right of abode regardless of the Hong Kong immigration status of their parents), and Tam Nga Yin v Director of Immigration (which ruled that mainland-born children adopted by Hong Kong parents did not thus gain the right of abode). The CFA delayed its ruling on Chong, which had been heard in March, until Fateh Muhammad and Tam Nga Yin had also been heard.

On 20 July 2001 the CFA also ruled against Muhammad. The CFA upheld the CA's observation that were the Basic Law's requirements for permanent residence is required to be satisfied concurrently, the law did not intend to confer the right of abode on people with tenuous connections to Hong Kong. The CFA also rejected the argument that the Immigration Ordinance's imposition of additional requirements on the timing of the period of seven years' "ordinary residence" was inconsistent with the Basic Law, instead stating that the Basic Law was silent on the matter and that it was "legitimate for the Ordinance to fill the gap".

== Reactions ==
Counsel for Muhammad attempted to argue that the relevant provisions of the Immigration Ordinance discriminated against people not of Chinese origin; this was unsuccessful. The Hong Kong Human Rights Monitor in a press release accused the court of racism in interpreting the Basic Law more restrictively in Muhammad as compared to Ng Ka Ling v Director of Immigration. Acting Secretary for Security Timothy Tong was quoted as stating that he welcomed the ruling.
