= Director of Immigration v Chong Fung Yuen =

- Court of Final Appeal
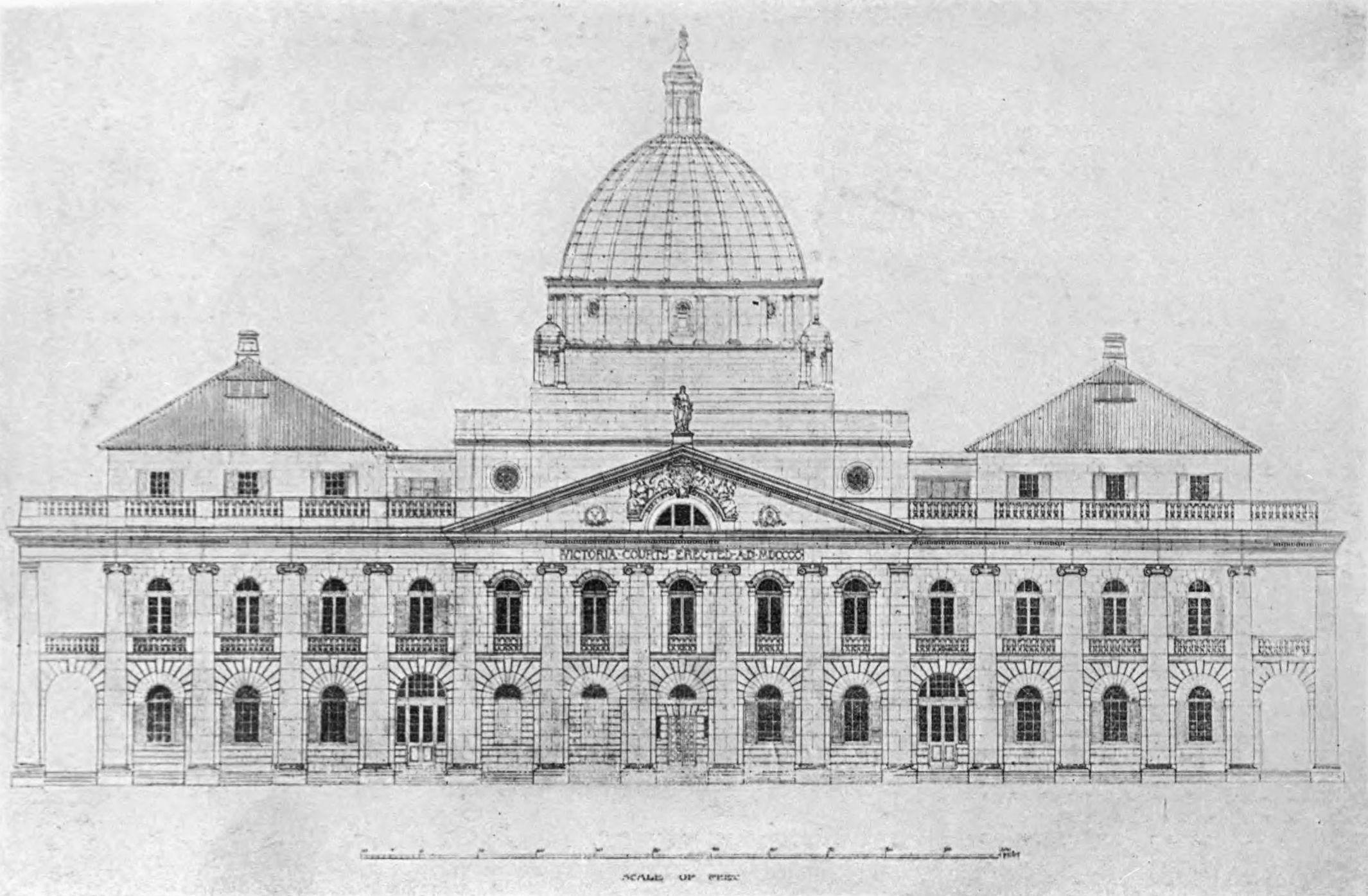
- Full case name: Director of Immigration v Master Chong Fung Yuen, an infant, by his grandfather and next friend Chong Yiu Shing
- Decided: 20 July 2001
- Citations: (2001) 4 HKCFAR 211 (2001) 4 HKCFAR 234 (Chinese Judgment) [2001] 2 HKLRD 533
- Transcript: text

Case history
- Prior actions: Chong Fung Yuen v. Director of Immigration HCAL 67/1999; Director of Immigration v. Chong Fung Yuen CACV 61/2000

Court membership
- Judges sitting: Chief Justice Andrew Li; permanent judges Kemal Bokhary, Patrick Chan, and Robert Ribeiro; non-permanent judge Anthony Mason

Director of Immigration v Chong Fung Yuen was a 2001 case in Hong Kong's Court of Final Appeal. Chief Justice Andrew Li, in the Court's unanimous opinion, affirmed lower court decisions that Chinese citizens born in Hong Kong enjoyed the right of abode regardless of the Hong Kong immigration status of their parents. The case touched on issues of interpretation of the Hong Kong Basic Law, both common law interpretation by courts in Hong Kong as well as interpretation by the Standing Committee of the National People's Congress (NPCSC) of the People's Republic of China. Professor Albert Chen of the University of Hong Kong describes the case as part of a "period of elaboration and consolidation of the regime of rights in the Hong Kong SAR", lasting roughly from 2000 to 2002.

== Background ==
The respondent, Chong Fung Yuen (莊豐源), was three years old at the time of the decision. His father Chong Kee Yan (莊紀炎) and mother lived in Shanwei, Guangdong. They came to Hong Kong as temporary visitors on two-way permits in September 1997 to visit the father's own father Chong Yiu Shing (莊曜誠). Chong Fung Yuen himself was born soon after they arrived. Chong Yiu Shing applied for permanent residency on his behalf. At the time of Chong's birth, another major right of abode case had already been set in motion, and would eventually reach the CFA as Ng Ka Ling v Director of Immigration. Following the unfavourable ruling for the Director of Immigration in that case, the Chief executive of Hong Kong (then Tung Chee Hwa) sought and on 26 June 1999 obtained an interpretation of Articles 22(4) and 24(2)(3) of the Basic Law from the NPCSC. That interpretation referred to the Basic Law Preparatory Committee's legislative intent behind the whole of Article 24 in rendering its decision.

Chong's case turned on Article 24(2)(1) of the Basic Law ("BL 24(2)(1)"), which states that permanent residents of Hong Kong include "Chinese citizens born in Hong Kong before or after the establishment of the Hong Kong Special Administrative Region", and Paragraph 2(a) of Schedule 1 to the Hong Kong Immigration Ordinance, which restricted that provision to persons whose "father or mother was settled or had the right of abode in Hong Kong at the time of the birth of the person or at any later time". Chong filed suit against the Director of Immigration in the Court of First Instance, claiming to be a permanent resident with the right of abode under BL 24(2)(1). Gladys Li represented Chong, while Joseph Fok represented the Director of Immigration. On 24 December 1999, Judge Frank Stock of the CFI ruled in Chong's favour, stating that the provision of the IO in question derogated from his rights under BL 24(2)(1). The CFI addressed only the language of BL 24(2)(1) and not the NPCSC interpretation. The Director of Immigration appealed to the Court of Appeal, where on 27 July 2000 Vice-president Simon Mayo and Justices Arthur Leong and Anthony Rogers also ruled in Chong's favour, affirming the lower court's decision regarding the language of BL 24(2)(1) and additionally stating that the NPCSC interpretation did not address BL 24(2)(1) and thus had no effect on it. The Director of Immigration appealed for the last time to the CFA, which dismissed the appeal.

Chong was one of three CFA cases relating to the right of abode that year, the other two being Fateh Muhammad v Commissioner of Registration (which ruled that a foreign national's seven years of "ordinary residence" qualifying him to apply for permanent residence must immediately precede his application, thus disqualifying a Pakistani migrant who resided in Hong Kong since the 1960s but had recently served a four-year prison sentence), and Tam Nga Yin v Director of Immigration (which ruled that mainland-born children adopted by Hong Kong parents did not thus gain the right of abode). The hearing was held in March, but the Court of Final Appeal refrained from issuing its decision until after the hearings on the latter two cases.

== Social effects ==
As a result of the Chong decision, 2,202 children born in Hong Kong to mainland mothers since 1997 immediately became entitled to the right of abode; of their mothers, 232 were illegal immigrants, while 1,821 were overstayers. The ruling led to fears of an influx of mainland women seeking to give birth in public hospitals, as well as calls for the government to seek an NPCSC interpretation in order to prevent that outcome. Acting Secretary for Security Timothy Tong was quoted as stating that the Immigration Department would take steps to tackle the problem of mainland women entering Hong Kong illegally, which was expected to worsen as a result of the ruling. He stated that illegal immigrant and overstaying mothers would be deported to the mainland regardless of their children's right of abode.

The calls to seek an NPCSC interpretation were ignored. In the coming years the increase in the number of mainland women giving birth in Hong Kong put strains on Hong Kong's health care system, from 2003 to 2008 jumping by a factor of 25. Beginning in 2007, the government began to adopt administrative measures to control public spending in the face of the influx; among other measures, this included tightened residency requirements on applications from Comprehensive Social Security Assistance. That year the Census and Statistics Department also began conducting a series of surveys entitled "Babies Born in Hong Kong to Mainland Women", targeting the parents of such babies. They achieved a response rate of above 80% during each of the survey periods. During the longest survey period, the fourth (from 6 January to 29 June 2010), they received surveys from the parents of 89% (14,685) of the babies born in Hong Kong to at least one mainland parent during the period under examination.

Chong himself settled in Hong Kong, living with his paternal grandmother and grandfather, while his younger sister remained in Shanwei. He has a younger sister, born in 1993. Chong had few opportunities for reunions with his family, often seeing them just twice a year during Chinese New Year and summer holidays. His father moved to Hong Kong in 2009, but took up employment in Yuen Long and did not live with his son. In an interview in 2011, Chong, by then 14 and a Form 1 student in Tuen Mun, described being affected by internet users' taunts of him as a "locust" and a "criminal"; however, he was still comfortable revealing his background to people around him, including his classmates.

== Legal principles ==
In the Chong decision, the Court of Final Appeal laid down an important principle of its approach to interpretation of the Basic Law. In Chong, the Court of Final Appeal held that 26 June 1999 NPCSC interpretation was only binding on BL 24(2)(3), and had no bearing on how to interpret BL 24(2)(1), the provision at issue in Chong. Thus, the court stated that it would interpret BL 24(2)(1) through the common law approach to interpretation. A literal reading of the law supported the contention that Chong Fung Yuen was entitled to the right of abode in Hong Kong. The court stated that "In the absence of a binding interpretation by the NPCSC, extrinsic materials cannot affect interpretation where the courts conclude that the meaning of the language is clear. It is clear if it is free from ambiguity, that is, it is not reasonably capable of sustaining competing alternative interpretations. The courts will not on the basis of any extrinsic materials depart from the clear meaning and give the language a meaning which the language cannot bear."

The NPCSC itself expressed "deep concern" over the ruling in the case, stating that it did not fully correspond with their earlier explanations of the Basic Law and contrasting it unfavourably with earlier court decisions which made decisions according to those explanations. Basic Law Committee member Elsie Leung would later criticise the court for its approach to interpreting the Basic Law. Po Jen Yap of the University of Hong Kong also criticised the CFA for effectively treating the NPCSC interpretation as having a judicial rather than statutory character, as though it were a ruling by a higher court, and in his opinion misusing this characterisation to treat the preamble of the interpretation as a mere obiter dictum.

Conversely, the Court of Final Appeal was criticised from another direction by Ling Bing of the Chinese University of Hong Kong, who felt that the court's statement that "the power of the Standing Committee extends to every provision in the Basic Law and is not limited to the excluded provisions referred to in art. 158(3)" overstated the NPCSC's BL 158 authority to interpret the Basic Law. Thomas E. Kellogg of Yale Law School sees this as an attempt to avoid political controversy, which aided in preserving the so-called "two-part referral test" established in Ng. That test, in the absence of any statutorily-specified mechanism to determine when the court should request interpretation from the NPCSC, established a high bar for such requests. He also praised the Chong decision for "aggressively protect[ing] the rights of the litigants involved".

Yang Xiaonan analysed the CFA's reluctance to rely on extrinsic materials in Chong in terms of balance of power between the NPCSC and the CFA, as well as fairness to judicial review applicants: some documents which may aid in ascertaining the authentic intentions of the Basic Law's drafters are likely to be confidential and thus accessible only to the NPCSC, not to the CFA or to applicants. Excessive reliance on extrinsic materials could thus harm the authority and autonomy of the CFA. The CFA also stated, even where extrinsic materials may be considered in interpreting the Basic Law, courts should limit themselves to pre-enactment materials; Yang made analogies between the CFA's approach and the originalist approach to U.S. constitutional interpretation. He went on to analyse the CFA's actions in terms of the political climate in Hong Kong at the time: by emphasising the literalist tradition of common law, the CFA promoted predictability, a core value of the rule of law. As he stated, "if the CFA establishes advanced, mature and coherent methodologies, this may increase public support for the courts". Public support for Hong Kong courts puts pressure on the NPCSC, which as a political body rather than a judicial one takes into account the costs and ramifications of using its power of interpretation to overrule the CFA, including the possibility of damaging public confidence in the rule of law in Hong Kong.
