= Lau Kong Yung v Director of Immigration =

Hong Kong constitutional law case regarding immigration

- Court of Final Appeal
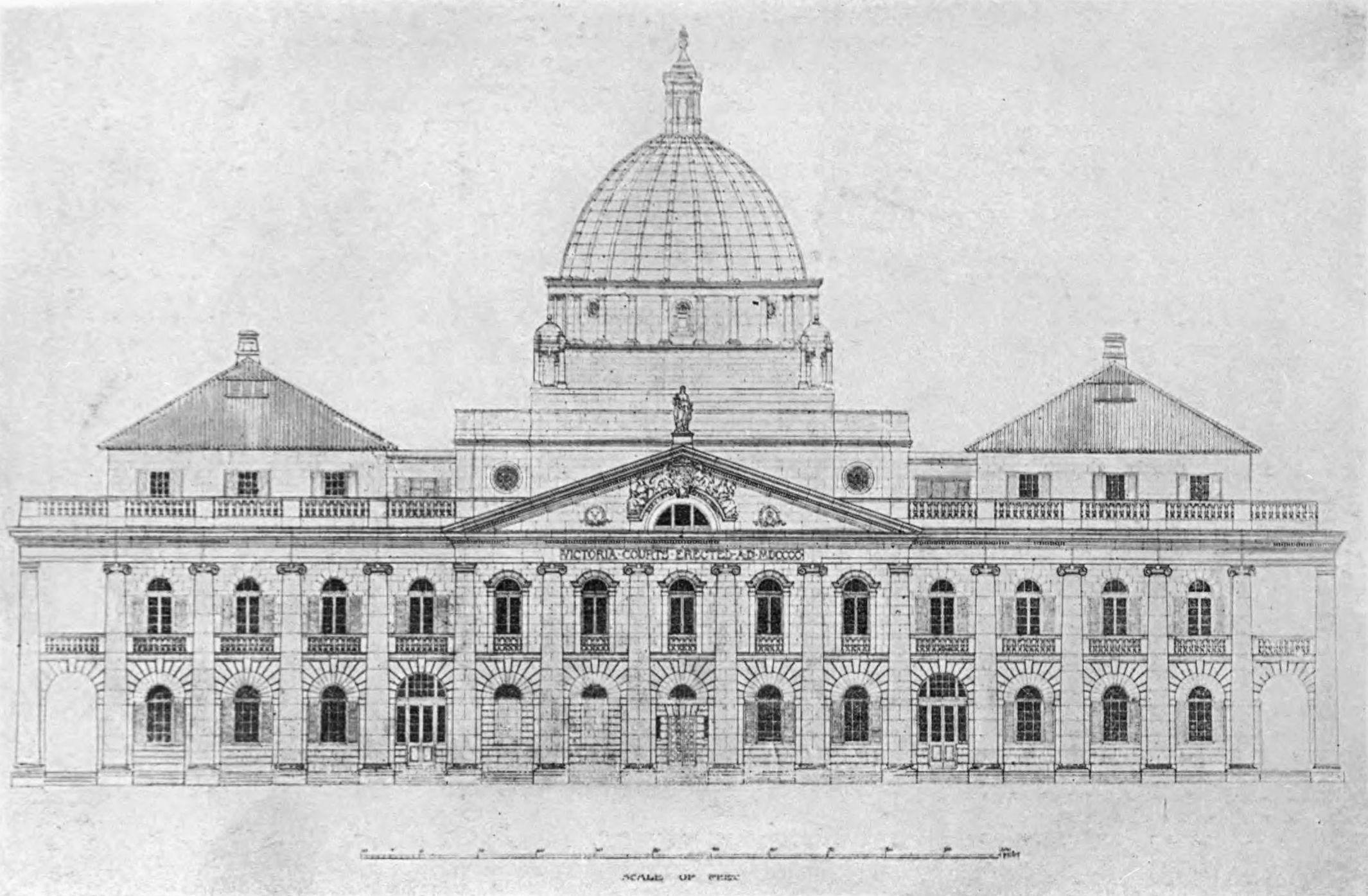
- Full case name: Lau Kong Yung, an infant, suing by his father and next friend Lau Yi To and 16 others v Director of Immigration
- Chinese case name: 劉港榕等17人 對 入境事務處處長
- Decided: 3 December 1999
- Case numbers: HCAL 20/1999; CACV 108/1999; CACV 109/1999; FACA 109/1999; FACA 10/1999; FACA 11/1999
- Citations: (1999) 2 HKCFAR 300, [1999] 3 HKLRD 778, [1999] 4 HKC 731
- Transcript: FACV 10/1999

Lau Kong Yung v Director of Immigration was a 1999 right of abode case in the Hong Kong Court of Final Appeal following closely on the heels of the landmark Ng Ka Ling v Director of Immigration decision earlier that year. After Ng and the two prior actions in Lau, but before the case came before the CFA, the Standing Committee of the National People's Congress (NPCSC) of the People's Republic of China issued an interpretation of the Basic Law which affected the rights of Lau and his fellow applicants. Lau thus became the first case in which the CFA had to take into account an NPCSC interpretation in applying the Basic Law.

== Background ==
Lau Kong Yung (劉港榕) and his 16 fellow applicants were mainland Chinese-born children of Hong Kong permanent residents and on that basis claimed to be entitled to the right of abode. The Director of Immigration made removal orders against them on the grounds that they had arrived in Hong Kong on two-way permits and subsequently breached their limits of stay, and did not hold certificates of entitlement to demonstrate their right of abode (which would include the right not to be subject to a removal order). They sued the Director in the Court of First Instance to quash the removal orders, stating that the Director had acted unlawfully in refusing to consider other evidence that they had the right of abode.

== Hearings and rulings ==
Mr Justice Wally Yeung of the CFI ruled for the Director on 30 March 1999. The applicants appealed to the Court of Appeal, which overturned the CFI on 11 June 1999. Then, on 26 June 1999, the NPCSC responded to a request of the Chief Executive of Hong Kong and issued an interpretation of BL 24(2)(3) which effectively overturned the CFA's decision in Ng. The Director of Immigration, represented by Geoffrey Ma (later to become chief justice), then appealed the CA's decision in Lau to the CFA. The short-term effect of the NPCSC interpretation was that Lau and his 16 fellow applicants were found not entitled to the right of abode in Hong Kong at that time; the more far-reaching effect was that the CFA ruled that the NPCSC's exercise of interpretation power was not dependent upon referral by the judiciary.

The court was unanimous in its opinion on the effects of the NPCSC's interpretation of Basic Law 24(2)(3). By majority, the court allowed the Director of Immigration's appeal. Justice Andrew Li wrote the unanimous opinion on the NPCSC interpretation issue, and the majority opinion on the appeal, while Justice Kemal Bokhary wrote a dissenting opinion regarding the appeal. Unusually, in addition every other presiding judge on the case wrote a concurring opinion stating they agreed with Li's opinion on the NPCSC interpretation, but laying out additional discussion.

== Outside views ==
Yang Xiaonan criticised two points of Li's opinion on the issues of the NPCSC's power of interpretation. The CFA, in accepting the NPCSC's authority to interpret the Basic Law, stated that it arose from Article 67(4) of the Constitution of China. However, the CFA also stated that the NPCSC interpretation, being of judicial character, had a retrospective effect and was thus applicable from 1 July 1997. Yang sees these two assertions as inherently contradictory: if the NPCSC's power of interpretation arises in the way that the CFA claims it does from the Chinese constitution, then such interpretations should be of legislative rather than judicial character, and thus are non-retrospective. He also pointed out that Basic Law 158(3) explicitly states that NPCSC interpretations do not affect judgments previously rendered.

Danny Gittings of the University of Hong Kong criticised Li's opinion on the NPCSC's powers of interpretation as "unnecessarily broad" and a "pre-emptive cringe". He suggested that Li could have simply concluded that the particular interpretation in question was lawful, rather than state that the NPCSC had no restrictions of any kind on its interpretive power, a ruling which far exceeded what was necessary to decide Lau. He criticised each of the judges of the CFA, including Bokhary, for being "willing to make such damaging concessions in order to avoid another confrontation in China". He analysed the court's decision as paving the way for the NPCSC's second interpretation of the Basic Law in connection with Donald Tsang's appointment as Chief Executive for two years in 2005.

Gittings' colleague Albert Chen was less pessimistic about the CFA's ruling. He admitted the possibility that frequent use of interpretation powers by the NPCSC could easily harm the autonomy of Hong Kong courts and public confidence therein. However, he pointed out that in Hong Kong, just as in other jurisdictions, constitutional law comprises not just the "bones" of the written text itself, but also the "flesh" of constitutional conventions which "buil[d] upon practices, habits, customs, and legitimate expectations" and "evolve gradually to supplement the formal provisions". In Chen's view, the evolving constitutional convention in Hong Kong seemed to be that the NPCSC refrains from interpreting the Basic Law on its own initiative, but only does so when requested by Hong Kong's executive or judicial branches. The conditions for the judicial branch to request an interpretation is delineated by the Basic Law and the referral tests defined in Ng Ka Ling, while the executive branch itself refrains from requesting interpretation except with significant support from the legislature or public opinion.
