= Amina Bokhary controversy =

Assault conviction of a wealthy woman

The Amina Bokhary controversy occurred in Hong Kong in 2010 involving the assault conviction of a wealthy woman from a well-connected family. Amina Mariam Bokhary, 32, received a sentence of probation (a non-custodial sentence) and a one-year driving ban following an incident in the aftermath of a road traffic accident when she struck several police officers. She had committed similar offences in 2001 and 2008.

The perceived leniency in her sentence provoked an uproar in Hong Kong for alleged preferential treatment. In particular, the presiding judge caused outrage when he said in his judgment that Bokhary had an "unblemished background and was born into a good family with caring parents [and] an outstanding academic record". The comment highlighted the public perception of widening inequality and increasing disparities in the balance of power between different social classes in Hong Kong. The judge came under pressure to reconsider his decision but he declined to vary his order upon review. Pundits also blamed the Department of Justice for charging her with an offence carrying a lesser maximum penalty; the Department of Justice appealed her sentence.

Opinion polls carried out indicated that the public's confidence in the judiciary and the impartiality of the courts had been shaken in light of the incident. Ultimately, Bokhary breached her conditions of probation and was re-sentenced to six weeks' imprisonment. On appeal, her driving ban was extended by two years.

== Background to the incident ==
Bokhary was a member of an influential Hong Kong family. Her father, Syed Bagh Ali Shah, was a council member of the former Stock Exchange of Hong Kong. Her uncle, Kemal, was a judge sitting at the Hong Kong Court of Final Appeal, and Kemal's wife was a High Court judge, at the time of the trial; a maternal uncle, Ronald Arculli, had been the chairman of Hong Kong Exchanges and Clearing and was a non-official member of the Executive Council of Hong Kong. Her grandfather, Daoud Bokhary, served in the British Indian Army and founded Bokhary Securities.

Bokhary attended university in the United Kingdom and graduated with a first-class honors degree in economics. She has had a string of jobs in the fashion industry, including Sotheby's, LVMH, and Harvey Nichols in Hong Kong. According to her counsel, Bokhary failed to find peace or satisfaction in her personal and professional life after returning to Hong Kong from Britain, and in 2007 was diagnosed with bipolar disorder, for which she was being treated with strong psychotropic drugs and was reportedly undergoing intensive counselling. Her increasing alcohol consumption, combined with her medication, was said to have contributed to her violent outburst in 2008.

=== Prior incidents ===
Bokhary's first brush with the police was in the early hours of 24 June 2001, when the manager of a bar in Central district of Hong Kong reported to police that she was causing a disturbance. When police officers arrived and attempted to arrest Bokhary, she hit one officer on the cheek; it took four officers at the scene to put her in handcuffs. Police also found a plastic bag with small amounts of cocaine on her person. She was found guilty of the assault and fined HK$9,000 (US$1,153). She was held not guilty of cocaine possession because of doubts over the evidence.

Bokhary was involved in a second altercation at around 3 am on 13 July 2008, again in Central. Short of cash with which to pay the HK$17.80 taxi fare, she proffered her credit card. When the taxi driver refused, Bokhary angrily flung her credit card in the driver's face; she kicked him when he prevented her from leaving the scene. The police were called. As she was being questioned by the two officers, Bokhary struck one of them. She was arrested and charged with common assault and assaulting a police officer. She was on medication and had drunk wine prior to the incident. Pleading guilty to both charges in November 2008, she was sentenced to 240 hours of community service and ordered to pay the driver HK$1,000 in compensation.

== Incident and trial ==
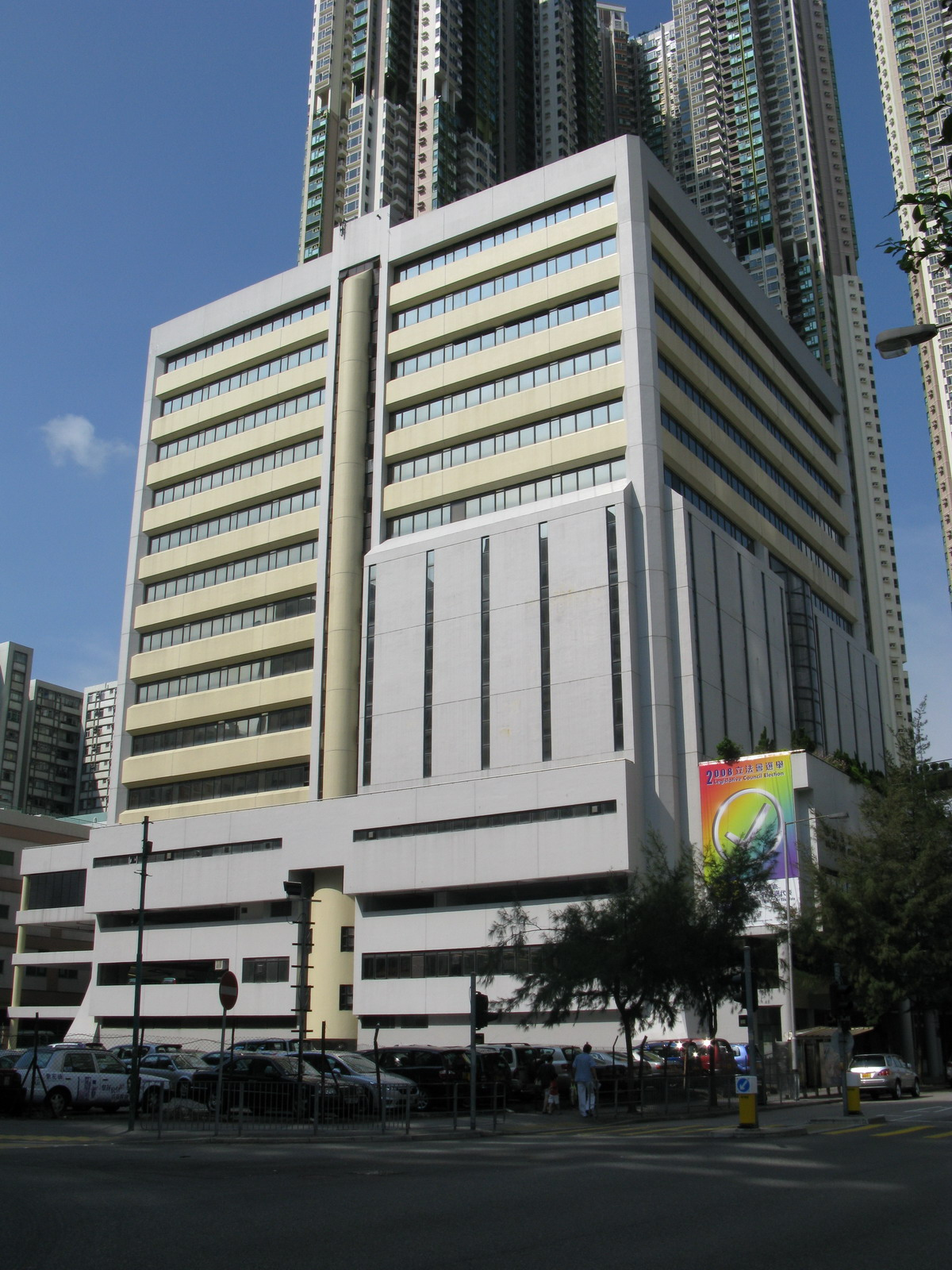
Eastern Magistrates' Court building, in which the controversial first trial took place

Bokhary's vehicle was involved in a head-on collision with a bus on Stubbs Road shortly after midnight on 27 January 2010. She refused paramedics' attempts to put her on a stretcher, returned to her vehicle, and continued to refuse to cooperate. She then attempted to walk away from the scene, but was prevented from doing so by a male police officer, whom she then slapped. She was handcuffed and charged with careless driving, refusing a breathalyser test, and two counts of assault on a police officer. She was released on HK$5,000 bail.

Scheduled to appear in Eastern Magistrates' Court on 7 April, Acting Principal Magistrate Bina Chainrai recused herself due to her familiarity with Bokhary; the defence was granted a further delay, to permit preparation of a medical assessment. She pleaded guilty on 7 July, advancing mental illness in mitigation. On 2 August, she was sentenced to 12 months' probation and a fine of HK$8,000; her driving licence was suspended for 12 months. As a condition of her probation, she would also enter a treatment programme at the Betty Ford Center in the United States. Passing sentence, magistrate Anthony Yuen Wai-ming stated that her offences would normally result in prison time, but he decided to be lenient because of her mental disorder. Yuen's comment in his judgment that Bokhary has an "unblemished background and was born into a good family with caring parents [and] an outstanding academic record" caused an uproar locally. Her resulting probation was criticised in certain quarters, notably by the police, for its leniency. Between 6 and 7 August, Magistrate Yuen reviewed the case, but did not change his ruling.

== Reactions ==
Various sectors of society expressed concern over the light sentence; the Police Inspectors' Association asked for clearer guidelines on the penalties to be expected in such cases. The Junior Police Officers' Association also complained that the probation decision could not be seen as a deterrent, but accepted that the court decision had to be respected as the magistrate "would have considered all factors." The Standard editorial derided Yuen's reasoning as "unpersuasive". Kevin Zervos, deputy director of Public Prosecutions, requested that Yuen rethink his sentence. The police also received criticism for charging Bokhary under the Police Force Ordinance – with a maximum penalty of six months imprisonment – instead of the Offences Against the Person Ordinance, which carries a maximum two-year sentence. Police Director of Crime and Security Xavier Tang responded that the lesser charge had been chosen because officers believed they had a better chance of conviction – she was said to be ready to plead guilty to assaulting police.

=== Public ===
An editorial in the South China Morning Post (SCMP) criticised Yuen's for citing her background, family, education and academic achievement as being mitigating factors, which to some implied such would "buy leniency from the courts". It summarised that "The failure to show any logical connection between family background and the sentence leaves the public with the perception that those with a notable surname are more equal than others."

A slap is an insult to the police officer and is therefore serious enough to warrant an immediate custodial sentence. The message can't be clearer, but this court cannot ignore the reason why she behaved the way she did.'

'Any reasonable person wouldn't [slap an officer] in front of so many other officers. [Her] behaviour was consistent with the mental illness she was, and is still, suffering.

'The 2001 incident was the underlying reason for the development of her illness ... Up to 2008, the defendant still lacked insight into her illness. It was unfortunate she was ordered to perform community service rather than [being given a] probation order.'

'The public is of the view that the court favours rich people and people with a prominent background ... [but] the focus of this case is not whether the defendant is rich or poor, [but] ... good or bad [by] nature, [and] whether or not he or she would repeat the offence.'

'[Sending the defendant to] prison for a few months would air the grievances of the public, but would destroy the rest of the life of the defendant.'

— Magistrate Anthony Yuen, South China Morning Post, 7 August 2010

With widespread criticism of his decision, the SCMP published on 7 August an explanation by Yuen, in which he said that Bokhary's behaviour was "consistent with the mental illness she was, and is still, suffering". He added that sending the defendant to "prison for a few months would air the grievances of the public, but would destroy the rest of the life of the defendant."

Approximately 300 people protested outside the Legislative Council Building in Central on 8 August, while another 50, among them retired policemen, joined a Liberal Party-led march from Wan Chai to the Department of Justice building. In a telephone survey of 1,100 people conducted from 10 to 13 August by the Hong Kong Research Association, 91% responded that they felt the sentence was too light. Another survey of 1,007 people in the same period by the University of Hong Kong found that confidence in the judiciary had fallen; respondents' ratings on "fairness of the judicial system" fell to the lowest level since October 2004, while "rule of law" indicator and confidence in the "impartiality of the courts" also declined in the month. A Facebook page complaining about the sentence had attracted 42,500 participants by 4 August. Another Facebook group allegedly inciting Hong Kong residents to slap police officers was shut down by the site's administrators. Bokhary's lawyer Peter Duncan disputes that the widespread perception for Bokhary receiving a light sentence was due to her family's wealth and connections.

Under public pressure, the Department of Justice (DoJ) stated on 4 August that they were considering an appeal against Bokhary's sentence. In particular, Secretary for Justice Wong Yan-lung described Yuen's sentence as "inadequate" and stated that he would initiate a review. In a press release on 11 August, the DoJ stated that they had filed the application for leave to review with the Court of Appeal two days earlier.

=== Legal profession ===
In response to the increased negative attention on the judiciary, the Hong Kong Bar Association and the Law Society of Hong Kong on 11 August issued a joint statement to "allay misgivings of the public" and to explain the court's approach, whilst deploring "any attempt to bring public pressure on a Judge or Magistrate to change his or her mind upon a review of sentence". Senior Counsel Martin Lee also spoke out against the protest, which he described as mob rule and detrimental to the rule of law. Lee said he would have handed down the same sentence as Yuen in light of the facts of the case. Public focus had been expected to remain on Yuen as he is also the judge handling the case of Christina Chan, the protester charged with assaulting a police officer during the 2010 Hong Kong new year march, although the chairman of the Hong Kong Police Officers' Association stated that the two cases were not comparable. Chan was acquitted of the assault on 3 September.

=== Pundits ===
Former legislator Albert Cheng noted that had Bokhary been charged under the Police Ordinance, and not the Offences Against the Person Ordinance, she would have faced a custodial sentence of up to two years; furthermore, the police failed to charge Bokhary for allegedly assaulting a policewoman at the police station after her arrest; the police also prosecuted her for careless driving instead of the more serious offence of dangerous driving. Cheng said: "The public certainly has the right to voice its anger against any injustice. But, in this case, its targets shouldn't be the government or the courts, but Secretary for Justice Wong Yan-lung, who is responsible for prosecutions and all government legal matters." Legislator and former Secretary for Security, Regina Ip, said: "At the end of the day, the sense of outrage is not about justice and penalties, but about the widening inequality between rich and poor, between the corporate giant and the artless individual, and the yawning asymmetry of money, knowledge and expert power between the haves and have-nots of our society." Political commentator Michael Chugani agreed that public anger existed due to the belief that Hong Kong society had become too unfair, and that the verdict was confirmation to some of this view. He said that the public outrage responsible for forcing the Department of Justice to appeal against Bokhary's sentence was unlikely to result in a happy ending because both outcomes were potentially damaging: the jailing of Bokhary would imply the judicial system had succumbed to public pressure; if she was not jailed, the system would be tarnished by accusations of favouritism.

=== Probation breach and prison sentence ===
Bokhary appeared before magistrates court on 23 December 2010 and was sentenced to six weeks in prison for breaking five out of seven conditions of her 2 August probation order: she failed to complete three months' alcohol rehabilitation in the United States; failed to report to her probation officer or to participate in programmes arranged by same as required; did not reside as directed; refused to receive psychiatric and psychological treatment. Her lawyer said Bokhary had become increasingly paranoid as a result of the media attention and felt that "she had become a target of abuse". The court rejected her bail application. Prosecution appealed against the sentence, a one-year driving ban and probation order, imposed on Bokhary for failing to provide a breath specimen. The appeal against the probation order was dropped when she was jailed, but at a hearing on 11 January, the Court of Appeal extended Bokhary's driving ban to three years. She served four weeks of the sentence, and was released on 22 January 2011.
