= Gerald de Basto =

Hong Kong judge, barrister and author

Gerald Arthur de Basto, QC (Chinese:巴士度;31 December 1924 – 28 January 2017) was a Hong Kong judge, barrister and author.

Gerald Arthur de Basto was born in December 1924 to Bernard de Basto and Lucie Marie Pattard. Together with Oswald Cheung, Charles Ching and Ronald Arculli, de Basto founded Sir Oswald Cheung's Chambers in 1965. He was subsequently appointed Queen's Counsel in 1968 and was made judge of the District Court in 1973 and the High Court in 1982. He was also chairman of the Hong Kong Bar Association from 1968 and 1970 and again in 1973. He co-founded the Hong Kong Law Journal with another barrister Henry Litton and was the editor-in-chief of the journal.

De Basto was married Diana Wilkinson and had two sons; Roger Alexander de Basto and Richard Jeremy Charles de Basto. He died in January 2017 in Cape Town, South Africa at the age of 92.

Legal offices
Preceded by S.V. Gittins	Chairman of Hong Kong Bar Association; 1968–1971	Succeeded by Henry Litton
Preceded by Henry Litton	Chairman of Hong Kong Bar Association; 1973–1974	Succeeded by A. Zimmern
