= Henry Litton =

Hong Kong judge

The Honourable Henry Litton GBM, CBE, SC, JP

Non Permanent Judge of the Court of Final Appeal
- In office 14 September 2000 – 13 September 2015
- Chief Justice: Andrew Li; Geoffrey Ma

Permanent Judge of the Court of Final Appeal
- In office 1 July 1997 – 14 September 2000 Serving with Charles Ching and Kemal Bokhary
- Chief Justice: Andrew Li
- Preceded by: Court Established
- Succeeded by: Patrick Chan

Personal details
- Born: 7 August 1934 (age 92) Hong Kong
- Spouse(s): Jennifer Lightfoot (1960); Linda Siddall (1975-today)
- Children: Sarah Litton (b.1962); John Litton (b.1966); Mark Litton (b.1967); Edward Litton (b.1976); Georgina Litton (b.1979); Thomas Litton (b.1980)
- Parent(s): John Letablere Litton (1903-1941); Enid Lo Tak-ching (1904-1999)
- Education: Diocesan Boys' School; Merton College, Oxford

Henry Denis Litton GBM, CBE, SC (Chinese: 烈顯倫; born 7 August 1934) is a retired judge in Hong Kong.

== Early life and education ==
Born into a Eurasian family in Hong Kong, Henry Litton excelled in school during his early years first at the Diocesan Boys' School in Hong Kong and then in England which he was educated at King's College, Taunton and Merton College, Oxford, where he graduated with honours in jurisprudence.

His father, John Letablere Litton (1903–1941), served as a gunner in the Hong Kong Volunteer Defence Corps. He was killed in action on 18 December 1941 defending Hong Kong from Japanese attack, and was buried in Stanley Military Cemetery. His mother Enid Tak-ching Lo-Litton was a tennis player and won thirteen Hong Kong National Championships over a 24-year span. John's maternal uncle was the lawyer Sir Lo Man-kam, part of a prominent Eurasian family.

Litton is linked to the Anglo-Irish / Huguenot Littons' clan from Dublin, whom came via Yorkshire and also to politician Edward Litton.

== Legal career ==
After passing the Bar exam in 1959, Litton entered into private practice in Hong Kong where he was eminently successful as a trial lawyer. Litton was appointed Queen's Counsel in 1970 and co-founded the Hong Kong Law Journal with Gerald de Basto QC, another local barrister. He also served as Chairman of the Bar Association from 1971 to 1973, from 1977 to 1980 and again from 1983 to 1985.

Litton was appointed in 1987 an Officer of the Most Excellent Order of the British Empire for his contribution to the law and was elevated to the bench in 1992 as a Justice of Appeal. He rose steadily through the ranks, becoming Vice-President of the Court of Appeal in 1995 and a Permanent Judge of the Court of Final Appeal (Hong Kong's court of last resort) in 1997, when British colonial rule in Hong Kong ended and China resumed its sovereignty over the region.

He assumed senior status three years later, citing personal reasons. Until 2015, he continued to hear cases on a part-time basis as a non-permanent judge of the Court he served.

In 2007, Litton was appointed a Judicial Commissioner, as well as a Justice of Appeal, of the Supreme Court of Brunei Darussalam.

== Post-judicial life ==
In 2019, Litton released his book Is the Hong Kong Judiciary Sleepwalking to 2047?, in which he criticised numerous aspects of Hong Kong's legal system, focusing particularly on the misuse of judicial reviews in recent years. He also argued that courts ought not serve as a “debating chamber” to challenge government policy.

Litton is known to be a great advocate of environmentalism; his wife Linda Siddall was a founder and Director of Friends of the Earth (HK) and Litton himself its patron. He is also an avid player of tennis. Litton's son John continues the family's legal eminence, practising at the London and Hong Kong bar since 1989, taking silk in 2010.

Legal offices
Preceded by Gerald de Basto	Chairman of Hong Kong Bar Association; 1971–1973	Succeeded by Gerald de Basto
Preceded by Charles Ching	Chairman of Hong Kong Bar Association; 1977–1980	Succeeded by Martin Lee
Preceded by Martin Lee	Chairman of Hong Kong Bar Association; 1983–1985	Succeeded by Denis Chang
New office	Permanent Judge of the Court of Final Appeal; 1997–2000; Served alongside: Charles Ching, Kemal Bokhary	Succeeded by Patrick Chan
Order of precedence
Previous: William Purves; Recipient of the Grand Bauhinia Medal	Hong Kong order of precedence Recipient of the Grand Bauhinia Medal	Succeeded by Li Ka-shing; Recipient of the Grand Bauhinia Medal
