= Vallejos v Commissioner of Registration =

2013 Hong Kong court case

Vallejos and Domingo v Commissioner of Registration
- Judiciary of Hong Kong
- Court: Court of Final Appeal, Hong Kong
- Full case name: Vallejos Evangeline Banao also known as Vallejos Evangeline B. and Daniel Domingo L. v Commissioner of Registration and Registration of Persons Tribunal (FACV 19 and 20/2012)
- Decided: 2013-03-25
- Citation: (2013) 16 HKCFAR 45
- Transcript: HKLII

Case history
- Prior actions: Vallejos v Commissioner of Registration (HCAL 124/2010); Domingo and Domingo v Commissioner of Registration (HCAL 127 and 128/2010); Commissioner of Registration v Vallejos (CACV 204/2011); Commissioner of Registration v Domingo (CACV 261/2011)

Vallejos and Domingo v Commissioner of Registration was a court case against the government of Hong Kong by two foreign domestic helpers (FDHs) seeking permanent residence and the right of abode in Hong Kong. Because of its subject matter it was commonly referred to in the media as the FDHs' right of abode case (外傭居港權案). Evangeline Vallejos and Daniel Domingo were two of five applicants who in various groups filed three right of abode lawsuits in 2010; the ruling in Vallejos' case was expected to be a precedent for the other two.

On 30 September 2011, Justice Johnson Lam of the Court of First Instance of the High Court (CFI) ruled in Vallejos' case that existing legislation restricting FDHs from qualifying for permanent residence contravened the Hong Kong Basic Law. Lam also found that Vallejos and Domingo, but not the three other applicants, had fulfilled the condition of taking Hong Kong as their only permanent home and being ordinarily resident in Hong Kong for seven years. The Court of Appeal of the High Court overturned the CFI's decision on Vallejos' case on 28 March 2012. Vallejos and Domingo then jointly appealed to the Court of Final Appeal (CFA), which heard their case on 26–28 February 2013; the CFA rejected their appeal on 25 March 2013.

== Background ==
=== The applicant ===
The first applicant in the CFA case, Evangeline Banao Vallejos, is a native of the Philippines, where she was previously a businesswoman. She came to Hong Kong in 1986 as an FDH, while the territory was still a British colony. During her first year in Hong Kong, she switched employers, but afterwards continued to work for the family of Barry Ong for more than two decades. She performed volunteer work and became active in a church. She approached the Immigration Department for verification of eligibility for permanent residence in April 2008. In November that year, the Immigration Department informed her that her application was not successful; she was not considered to be "ordinarily resident" in Hong Kong by reason of Immigration Ordinance Article 2(4)(a)(vi). The following month, she approached the Registration of Persons Office to apply for a Hong Kong Permanent Identity Card, for which she was also rejected. She appealed to the Registration of Persons Tribunal, which in June 2009 ruled against her. At that point, Vallejos applied to the Legal Aid Department for help; local law firm Barnes and Daly, as well as barrister Gladys Li, agreed to assist Vallejos in applying for judicial review to rule on whether the relevant provision of the Immigration Ordinance complied with the Basic Law. The case came to mainstream media attention in December 2010.

Vallejos turned out to be one of five Philippine nationals who would file applications for judicial review. The others were applying jointly in groups of two. Daniel Domingo (the second applicant in the CFA case) and his wife Irene Raboy Domingo had been working in Hong Kong since the 1980s as FDHs, met, married, and bore three children there. They had applied for verification in April 2006, and had been granted unconditional stay but not permanent residence in November 2007. Josephine Gutierrez came to Hong Kong in 1991, where her son Joseph James Gutierrez was born in 1996; both applied for verification in December 2006. Vallejos' court date was set for 22 August, while the others were scheduled for October. Vallejos stated that she hoped to retire in Hong Kong.

=== Immigration laws ===
The year after Vallejos arrived, the law of Hong Kong was amended to introduce the concept of "permanent residence". Permanent residence was a new status which would allow persons not born in the territory to gain the right of abode there. It was to be conditional on prior "ordinary residence" in Hong Kong, so that it would comply with the 1984 Sino-British Joint Declaration and the Hong Kong Basic Law Article 24(4) which would take effect in the future. Foreigners who "ordinarily resided" in the territory for seven years would be allowed to apply for permanent residence; if successful, they would gain various privileges including the franchise, freedom to stay in Hong Kong and switch employers without a work visa, and eligibility for public housing.

"Ordinarily resident", a term whose definition is found primarily in case law, had been qualified by statute as early as 1971 for purposes of establishing qualifications for other residence statuses. In 1982, the Immigration Ordinance was amended to state in Article 2(4)(a) that people who had landed unlawfully, had breached their limit of stay, or were refugees, would not be treated as "ordinarily resident". In 1989, Article 2(4)(a) was again amended to further exclude people in immigration detention from the definition of "ordinarily resident". On 1 July 1997, immediately after the transfer of sovereignty over Hong Kong, additional amendments to the Immigration Ordinance came into effect. Among other changes, these excluded four further classes of persons from the definition of "ordinarily resident": foreign contract workers under importation of labour schemes, foreign domestic helpers, consular staff in Hong Kong, and members of the People's Liberation Army Hong Kong Garrison. Another amendment in 2002 excluded holders of "prescribed Central People's Government travel document[s]". Thus, in total nine classes of people physically present in Hong Kong were defined by statute not to be "ordinarily resident".

== Court of first Instance ==
=== Hearing and ruling ===
The hearing on Vallejos' case began on 22 August 2011, and stretched out until the 24th. David Pannick represented the respondent, the Commissioner of Registration. During the hearing, the courtroom was packed to overflowing with lawyers, journalists, and other members of the public, who took up not just the seats in the public gallery, but also those for defendants and jury members (the latter being unoccupied as the case at hand was not a jury trial but a judicial review). Another hundred people watched the proceedings on a large-screen television in the lobby, while protestors both supporting and opposing Vallejos' case faced off outside the building without incident.

Justice Johnson Lam Man-hon of the CFI had been expected to rule on the case on 29 September 2011. However, the Hong Kong Observatory raised tropical cyclone warning signal No. 8 due to the approach of Typhoon Nesat early that morning, meaning that government offices closed for the day. The next morning, the weather had returned to normal, and Lam announced his ruling that the relevant provision of the Immigration Ordinance was inconsistent with the Basic Law. Vallejos herself did not attend court that day, as she was at work.

Throughout the rest of October and November, Lam heard arguments and delivered judgments in two further FDH residence cases, namely Irene R. Domingo and Daniel L. Domingo v Commissioner of Registration (HCAL 127 and 128/2010) and Josephine B. Gutierrez and Joseph James Gutierrez v Commissioner of Registration (HCAL 136 and 137/2010). Among those applicants, only Daniel Domingo was found to have satisfied the "ordinary residence" requirement entitling him to apply for permanent residence; Lam found that Domingo's wife Irene's period of ordinary residence was interrupted by a period of overstay in which she remained in Hong Kong without the authority of the Director of Immigration. He separately ruled that Josephine Gutierrez had not taken positive steps to establish Hong Kong as her only place of permanent residence, meaning that she and her son Joseph James were not entitled to apply for permanent residence either.

=== Governmental reactions ===
The day of the ruling, Hong Kong Secretary for Security Ambrose Lee announced that the government would appeal Lam's ruling, and separately would apply to stay the judgment in a hearing in October. He also stated that the Immigration Department would suspend right of abode applications by FDHs, and that such action did not amount to contempt of court as commentators had suggested.

Government officials in Indonesia and the Philippines, the two major countries of origin of FDHs in Hong Kong, reacted favourably to the ruling. Philippine President Benigno Aquino III welcomed the news, though stating that he was not too familiar with Hong Kong's laws and would look into the matter. Philippine vice-president Jejomar Binay called it "a step forward in recognizing the rights of migrants". Philippine Department of Foreign Affairs spokesman Raul Hernandez was more circumspect, stating in general terms that the government welcomed developments which improved the situation of overseas Filipino workers, but that he would refrain from further comment as other similar cases were still pending. Gusti Made Arka, director-general for workers abroad with the Indonesian Ministry of Labour, similarly stated that "We have always considered Hong Kong one of the best places for our workers ... We hope that this decision is seen as a benchmark and that other countries do the same".

=== NGO and public reactions ===
Justice Lam, knowing that whatever decision he made would be controversial, took time to emphasise during the court proceedings that his job was to rule on the content of the law, not to take into account political or social factors, which would be the job of the legislature. Migrants from the Philippines and Indonesia called on their respective governments to discuss the situation with the Hong Kong government and find a way to allay the Hong Kong public's concerns over the ruling.

=== Application for stay of judgment ===
On 4 October, the government filed an application for a stay of execution of Lam's earlier judgment. David Pannick, again representing the Commissioner, had argued that the "status quo should be maintained" until appeals had been exhausted. However, on 26 October, Johnson Lam ruled against the government's application for stay. He noted that his earlier ruling applied only to the case of Vallejos herself. He stated that other FDHs would be free to file applications. However, he stated that it would be entirely permissible for the Immigration Department to delay processing of such applications until after appeals, and that such action would not constitute contempt of court as the government had feared. He further stated that if the Immigration Department chose not to entertain other applications by FDHs, it was up to those applicants themselves to take their cases to court. He also pointed out that "[s]hort of a temporary validity order, the court cannot pre-empt any person from relying on the legal principles set out in a judgment of the court"; the government did not seek such an order, and Lam doubted that the court had jurisdiction to give it. Thus, as he stated, the relief sought by the government would not shield it from suits by other right of abode applicants. Vallejos' solicitor Mark Daly stated that his client's residence application was "100 percent [sic] sure" as a result. The Hong Kong Human Rights Monitor was quoted as welcoming the ruling.

== Court of Appeal ==
=== Hearing ===
In October 2011, the government filed an appeal from Lam's CFI judgment in the Court of Appeal, and was assigned the case number CACV 204/2011. The government's submission stated that Lam erred in finding that foreign domestic helpers' residence in Hong Kong could not be regarded as "out of the ordinary", in finding that the government's right to apply immigration control under Basic Law Article 154 could not be applied to Vallejos, and in failing to consider extrinsic materials from both prior to and subsequent to the publication of the Basic Law in 1990. High Court Chief Judge Andrew Cheung and High Court vice-presidents Robert Tang and Frank Stock heard the government's appeal on 21–23 February 2012. David Pannick continued to represent the government. In the first day of the hearing, Pannick argued that "there is no undermining of the rule of law if the legislature enjoys a certain margin of discretion". Pannick also pointed to the previous British administration's treatment of Vietnamese refugees in Hong Kong in the 1980s as a precedent. He further brought up examples from UK law, such as the fact that time spent there on a student visa was not regarded as "ordinary residence" and did not count towards the time required to obtain indefinite leave to remain.

Vallejos herself was again unable to attend court. Her counsel Gladys Li responded to Pannick's arguments by stating that Vietnamese refugees were not given identity cards and had to live in government-specified refugee centres; she thus argued that Vietnamese refugees did not fall within the definition of "ordinarily resident". She also argued that the case of Vietnamese refugees was of no value as a precedent, since unlike before 1997 when the colonial government was free to make any immigration laws without limitation, the Hong Kong government today is bound by the Basic Law. Li contrasted the treatment of Vietnamese refugees with that of FDHs: while FDHs' work contracts limited their place of residence, they were issued with identity cards, could have ordinary social lives outside of work. She described their position as comparable to foreign civil servants. She also argued that the standard FDH contract's requirement that an FDH return to his or her country of origin every two years did not affect Vallejos' ordinary residence in Hong Kong, because she was offered a renewal of contract prior to departure each time, and her departure from Hong Kong was little different than any other category of employee required by his or her employer to take a compulsory leave. However, Justice Stock did not seem convinced by this argument, stating that Vallejos' absence from Hong Kong was "enforced", while Justice Tang pointed out that Vallejos could not return to Hong Kong as she wished during such absences, further bringing into doubt the idea that she could be considered "ordinarily resident" during such absences.

The hearing concluded on the 23rd as scheduled.

=== Ruling ===
On 28 March 2012, the Court of Appeal announced its ruling that the impugned provision (Immigration Ordinance 2(4)(a)(vi)) does not violate the Basic Law. Vallejos' solicitor Mark Daly indicated directly afterwards that his client was highly likely to appeal the decision to the Court of Final Appeal.

== Court of Final Appeal ==
Vallejos and Daniel Domingo appealed their cases to the Court of Final Appeal, and were respectively assigned the case numbers FACV 19 and 20/2012. They would be represented before the CFA by Michael Fordham; David Pannick continued to represent the Government. Chief Justice Geoffrey Ma rejected a further application for joinder by eight-year-old Liang Wing-ki, the Hong Kong-born daughter of mainland parents, whose next friend, mother Li Yinxian, filed suit on her behalf. Philip Dykes, for the applicant, argued that because Vallejos and Domingo's case would touch on issues of interpretation of the Basic Law under Article 158, Liang's interests would also be affected. In rejecting Liang's application, Ma stated: "We feel that the points you seem to argue are adequately covered and will be adequately covered". Liang and other Hong Kong-born children like her were ruled to be entitled to the right of abode in Hong Kong in the 2001 case Director of Immigration v Chong Fung Yuen.

Vallejos and Domingo's appeal came before the CFA on 26 February 2013, in a hearing that would last for three days. Fordham's arguments focused on the constitutionality or lack thereof in the use of a "blanket exclusion" to prevent all people belonging to certain classes of residents from falling within the definition of "ordinarily resident" and thus eventually becoming entitled to apply for right of abode. Pannick discussed the legislature's power to define terms used in the Basic Law; he stated that foreign domestic helpers "don't form part of the permanent population" and thus it was legitimate for lawmakers to create a legislative definition of "ordinarily resident" which excluded them. The hearing concluded on schedule. On 25 March 2013, the CFA issued its judgment that the restrictions on FDH's residence and employment in Hong Kong meant that they did not fall within the definition of "ordinarily resident" for immigration purposes; the judgment did not refer to the 1999 NPCSC interpretation, and thus with no Article 158 issues at hand, the CFA rejected the Government's request for the matter to be referred to the NPCSC for further interpretation.

== Public controversy surrounding the case ==
=== Potential impact on public spending ===
The Democratic Alliance for the Betterment and Progress of Hong Kong (DAB) spoke out in opposition to the possibility of permanent residence for FDHs, citing its potential high costs. DAB legislator Starry Lee predicted that 125,000 FDHs would each sponsor an average of three dependents to come to Hong Kong, meaning a total of 500,000 persons newly eligible for government programmes such as public education, housing subsidies, and Comprehensive Social Security Assistance, leading to tens of billions of dollars in additional public expenditures. Hong Kong Federation of Trade Unions legislator Pan Pey-chyou also expressed concern that increasing the labour supply by giving FDHs the freedom to pursue other employment could put other workers at a disadvantage. Lee's fellow DAB legislator Chan Kam-lam stated that the party had collected 91,500 signatures in 18 electoral districts, of whom all but 210 were in opposition to granting FDHs the right of abode. In response, Law Yuk-kai of the Hong Kong Human Rights Monitor expressed doubts about the DAB's expenditures figures, deriding them as "scare tactics" and comparing them to the DAB's earlier opposition to residence rights for mainland children in Ng Ka Ling v Director of Immigration. Eman Villanueva of the Asian Migrants' Coordinating Body also denounced the DAB's statements.

Civic Party chairman Alan Leong questioned the assumption that maids could qualify for permanent residence even if Vallejos won her case, noting that the Immigration Department required applicants for permanent residence to sign a declaration that, among other things, they had "sufficient means of income to support myself and my family in Hong Kong without assistance"; he suggested that the Immigration Department would be unwilling to accept such declarations from FDHs with a typical monthly income of little more than HK$3,000. Leong went on to accuse the Liberal Party of misleading the public on the issue. An unnamed Immigration Department employee interviewed by Sing Tao Daily, in response to Leong's comments, noted that low income was not necessarily a barrier to becoming a permanent resident, and that applications from other low-income persons such as foreign students were commonly approved.

Regina Ip stated that the government would have to allocate more resources to deal with the increased workload resulting from right of abode applications by FDHs. Since Lam's earlier ruling in favour of Vallejos in late September, there had been a definite rise in the number of FDHs applying for permanent residence, from just one or two such cases per month in the past, to an average of sixteen in August and September 2011, and over 20 applications on 25 October alone. In total, the Immigration Department stated that it had received 148 permanent residence applications from FDHs in October. A total of roughly 900 foreign domestic helpers made applications for permanent residence from October 2011 to late March 2012 when the Court of Appeal overturned Lam's ruling.

=== Civic Party connections to the case ===
Tourism functional constituency legislator Paul Tse raised questions about the Civic Party's links to the case, questions which were echoed by internet users including those on popular local forum Uwants as well as a Facebook group created by Tse to gather videos and articles on the potential negative impact of the judicial review. Vallejos' barrister, Gladys Li, is a founding member of the Civic Party. The Liberal Party took out attack ads stating that "Civic Party core member Gladys Li is helping foreign maids to fight their residence case", echoed the DAB's warnings of massive increases in population and public expenditures, and called on the Civic Party to make a formal public statement of whether or not the party itself supported permanent residence for FDHs. An editorial in Wen Wei Po the week after the ruling accused the Civic Party of being "an enemy of the people" for their alleged support of the maids' residence case. Public perceptions that pan-democratic candidates supported Vallejos' case are believed to have contributed to their poor showing in the November 2011 district councils elections.

=== Possibility of Standing Committee interpretation ===
As early as August 2011, there was speculation that the government would seek an interpretation of the Basic Law from the Standing Committee of the National People's Congress (NPC) of the People's Republic of China, either prior to the court ruling or after it, just as they did following Ng Ka Ling v Director of Immigration, a previous right of abode case which also drew heavy public attention. Liberal Party chairwoman Miriam Lau for her part stated that the public would not be likely to accept the government proactively seeking an interpretation before the ruling in the case came out; she said that interpretation should be a last resort, and the government should first look at other methods to resolve the residence problem. Hong Kong Federation of Trade Unions chairman and NPC delegate Cheng Yiu Tong stated that there was a high likelihood the government would seek an interpretation if they lost the case. Civic Party member Ronny Tong, in contrast, spoke out against calls to seek an interpretation, stating that it could result in "serious erosion to basic human rights". NPC delegate and former Legislative Council president Rita Fan stated that whether the government sought an interpretation before or after the case, it would be criticised either way for inviting "interference in Hong Kong affairs"; she also opined that an interpretation of the Basic Law would be a more appropriate method of dealing with the case, as opposed to Basic Law Committee deputy head Elsie Leung's suggestion of an amendment.

After the hearing opened, government counsel David Pannick stated in response to a question from Justice Johnson Lam that the government had no intention of seeking an interpretation before Lam had issued his decision, but reserved the possibility of doing so afterwards. In late September, the DAB renewed calls for the Hong Kong government to consider seeking an interpretation. There were further calls for an interpretation after the government's loss in the CFI. The New People's Party, headed by former Security for Secretary Regina Ip, also joined the calls for the government to seek interpretation. By 4 October, Ip and her two deputy party heads Michael Tien and Louis Shih had organised the gathering of 3,227 signatures in support of interpretation, which they presented to Ambrose Lee at a meeting with him; however, Lee stated that the government had no intention of seeking an interpretation in the short term. Basic Law Committee member Lau Nai-keung also wrote an editorial in the China Daily stating that the government should have made an application for interpretation prior to the ruling, and should definitely make one before the case goes to the Court of Final Appeal (CFA). However, after Lam declined to issue a stay of execution of his earlier judgment in late October, Alan Leong spoke out again against calls for a NPCSC interpretation, stating that Lam's ruling showed that the courts had recognised the Immigration Department's rights as "gatekeepers" and that there was no need for an interpretation.

Elsie Leung also called on the government to seek an interpretation as soon as possible; based her knowledge of the Court of Final Appeal's reading of the Basic Law in prior cases going back to Director of Immigration v Chong Fung Yuen in 2001, she did not expect that the government would be able to win its case in that venue. She further accused both the CFI and the CFA of ignoring the legislative intent of the Basic Law's drafters. On this point, University of Hong Kong law professor Albert Chen, also a member of the Basic Law Committee, noted that Lam had very little flexibility in how he could rule on Vallejos precisely due to CFA precedents in the Chong Fung Yuen case and other early right of abode cases. He stated that the CFA's reluctance to take into account extrinsic materials in determining the intent of Article 24 stemmed largely from the fact that the extrinsic materials available to the CFA regarding the intent of Article 24 were published after the Basic Law itself. As a solution, he suggested that, if Beijing made public the minutes from the negotiations leading up to the 1984 Sino-British Joint Declaration, which was the basis for the drafting of the Basic Law, it might persuade the CFA to re-examine its interpretation of Article 24; the Joint Declaration, being a treaty, was subject to principles of international law, under which signatories to a treaty had the right to issue explanations of their positions.

In 2013, after the Court of Final Appeal had finished hearing the case, Rao Geping (饒戈平) of Peking University Law School, who had earlier served as a mainland representative on the Basic Law Committee, stated that it should not be necessary for the Hong Kong government to seek another interpretation of the Basic Law either regarding Vallejos' case or the earlier Director of Immigration v Chong Fung Yuen (which gave Hong Kong permanent residence to Hong Kong-born children of non-Hong Kong resident mainland parents). In Rao's opinion the NPCSC had already clearly explained Article 24 of the Basic Law in its 1999 interpretation in the aftermath of Ng Ka Ling v Director of Immigration, and in particular had established that the Hong Kong government had the right to use the Immigration Ordinance to control who gained the right of abode in Hong Kong.

=== Marches and public protests ===
On 21 August, the day before the hearing began, 100 members of the group Caring Hong Kong Power (CHKP) planned a march from Victoria Park to Civic Party headquarters in North Point. Roughly 30 or so persons belonging to Socialist Action and the Chinese University of Hong Kong-alumni-dominated Leftist Reloaded confronted the CHKP members and attempted to prevent them from marching, claiming the CHKP members were promoting racism and discrimination. A scuffle broke out; police attempted to separate the two sides with barricades, but then people present at the scene began to clash with the police themselves. Police then arrested 15 men and four women and removed them from the scene; among them, three refused bail. Another march by CHKP marchers proceeded from Electric Road to the Civic Party headquarters without incident. However, as it was a Sunday, no party members or staff were present at Civic Party headquarters. According to a Ta Kung Pao report, 1,000 people attended that march.

The week after the judgment was announced, the DAB organised another march from Chater House in Central to the Tamar site in Admiralty on 2 October, while Caring Hong Kong Power planned a march for 9 October. According to separate Sing Tao Daily reports, 1,000 people attended the DAB's march, while 2,000 attended CHKP's. Marches and rallies continued to the end of the month. On 23 October 200 domestic helpers organised a candlelight vigil at Statue Square in support of the case. The following day, 1,500 people joined a Hong Kong Federation of Trade Unions march from Wan Chai to government headquarters in opposition to residence rights for domestic helpers.

Protests continued in 2012 as the appeal date drew near. On 29 January, Filipino migrant groups held a prayer vigil in Central supporting the right of abode for foreign domestic helpers. On 21 February, the first day of the Court of Appeal case, the Hong Kong Social Concern Group (香港社會關注組) organised protests calling on the government to seek an interpretation of the Basic Law from the NPCSC.
