= Ng Ka Ling v Director of Immigration =

Joint appeal of three cases

- Judiciary of Hong Kong
- Court: Court of Final Appeal
- Full case name: Ng Ka Ling v Director of Immigration
- Decided: 29 January 1999
- Citation: [1999] 2 HKCFAR 4
- Transcript: text

Case history
- Prior actions: Ng Ka Ling v Director of Immigration, CACV 216/1997; Ng Ka Ling v Director of Immigration, CACV 217/1997

Court membership
- Judges sitting: Chief Justice Andrew Li; permanent judges Henry Litton, Charles Ching and Kemal Bokhary; non-permanent judge Anthony Mason

Case opinions
- Decision by: Chief Justice Andrew Li

Ng Ka Ling v Director of Immigration (No 2)
- Judiciary of Hong Kong
- Court: Court of Final Appeal
- Full case name: Ng Ka Ling v Director of Immigration (No 2)
- Decided: 26 February 1999
- Citation: [1999] 2 HKCFAR 141
- Transcript: text

Case history
- Prior actions: Ng Ka Ling v Director of Immigration, FACV 14/1997

Court membership
- Judges sitting: Chief Justice Andrew Li; permanent judges Henry Litton, Charles Ching and Kemal Bokhary; non-permanent judge Anthony Mason

Case opinions
- Decision by: Chief Justice Andrew Li

Ng Ka Ling v Director of Immigration was a joint appeal of three cases decided in 1999 by Hong Kong's Court of Final Appeal (CFA). Chief Justice Andrew Li, in the Court's unanimous opinion, held that mainland-born children of Hong Kong permanent residents enjoyed the right of abode, regardless of whether one of their parents had acquired Hong Kong permanent residency at the time of birth of the children.

The Hong Kong Court of Final Appeal held that it had jurisdiction to review the consistency of legislation or acts of the National People's Congress (NPC) or the Standing Committee of the National People's Congress (NPCSC) of the People's Republic of China with the Hong Kong Basic Law, and if legislations or acts of the executive were found to be inconsistent, the jurisdiction to hold NPC or NPCSC acts invalid. The CFA judgment sparked serious controversy concerning the relationship between the Hong Kong Special Administrative Region (HKSAR) and the Central People's Government of China.

In an unprecedented move, the CFA issued a clarification under Ng Ka Ling v Director of Immigration (No 2) one month after the final appeal decision. The CFA clarified that it cannot question the authority of the NPCSC to do any act in accordance with provisions of the Basic Law and procedure therein.

== Background ==
All applicants were Chinese nationals born on the mainland. By the time of their birth, their respective fathers were Chinese citizens who had ordinarily resided in Hong Kong for a continuous period of not less than seven years. After the transfer of sovereignty to China on 1 July 1997, the applicants reported to the Immigration Department to assert their right of abode under Article 24(2)(3) of the Basic Law. The Director of Immigration failed to recognize their right. He arrested them and then released them on recognizances. The applicants instituted judicial review proceedings. They sought various declarations and orders quashing the Director's decisions.

Article 24(2)(3) of the Basic Law states that permanent residents of the Hong Kong Special Administrative Region include:

"Persons of Chinese nationality born outside Hong Kong of [Chinese citizens born in Hong Kong before or after the establishment of the Hong Kong Special Administrative Region, or Chinese citizens who have ordinarily resided in Hong Kong for a continuous period of not less than seven years before or after the establishment of the Hong Kong Special Administrative Region]."

The Article had its origin in Part XIV in Annex I of the Sino-British Joint Declaration which elaborated China's basic policies over Hong Kong. Part XIV stated that Chinese nationals who were born or who have ordinarily resided in Hong Kong before or after the establishment of the Hong Kong Special Administrative Region for a continuous period of 7 years or more, and persons of Chinese nationality born outside Hong Kong of such Chinese nationals are qualified to obtain permanent identity cards. Schedule 1 to the Immigration Ordinance prior to 1 July 1997, in prescribing the categories of persons who were Hong Kong permanent residents, did not follow the categories defined in Article 24(2) of the Basic Law. By the Immigration (Amendment) (No 2) Ordinance enacted by the Provisional Legislative Council on 1 July 1997, the old schedule was replaced by a new Schedule 1. Paragraph 2(c) of the new Schedule 1 restricted permanent residency of persons born outside Hong Kong to:

"[P]ersons of Chinese nationality born outside Hong Kong to a parent who is a permanent resident of the Hong Kong Special Administrative Region [and also a Chinese national], if the parent had the right of abode in Hong Kong at the time of the birth of the person."

On 10 July 1997, the Provisional Legislative Council further enacted the Immigration (Amendment) (No 3) Ordinance. It was deemed have retroactive effect and come into operation on 1 July 1997. A scheme to deal with the category of permanent residents by descent in paragraph 2(c) of Schedule 1 was introduced. Under this scheme, a person's status as a permanent resident under paragraph 2(c) can only be established by his holding of:

- (a) a valid travel document issued to him and of a valid certificate of entitlement also issued to him and affixed to such travel document;
- (b) a valid HKSAR passport issued to him; or
- (c) a valid permanent identity card issued to him.

For persons under category (a), one can only establish his status of having the right of abode by holding a valid travel document and a valid certificate of entitlement affixed to the travel document. A notice dated 11 July 1997 and published on 16 July 1997 in the Hong Kong Government Gazette specified that the application for a certificate of entitlement by persons residing in the Mainland of China at the time of application must be made through the Exit-Entry Administration of the Public Security Bureau in the district where he is residing.

== Hearing and rulings ==
Both the Court of First Instance and the Court of Appeal found that the Immigration (Amendment) (No 3) Ordinance was constitutional and retrospective provisions therein were not invalid. The Immigration (Amendment) (No 2) Ordinance was held unconstitutional for its intention to detract from the Basic law right given in clear terms to persons born outside Hong Kong of permanent residents; it was held unconstitutional to deny the right of abode to illegitimate children. Under the judgment, applicants who entered the Hong Kong SAR without a one-way permit or a valid certificate of entitlement under the (No 3) Ordinance were to be deported to the Mainland pending appeal.

On appeal to the Court of Final Appeal, the applicants maintained that as they are permanent residents within Article 24(2) of the Basic Law, they have the right of abode as conferred by Article 24(3) of the Basic Law. Cheung maintained that the fact that she was born out of wedlock should not affect her status as a permanent resident. The Director's position was that the applicants are subject to the scheme introduced by the Immigration (Amendment) (No 3) Ordinance 1997. Under the scheme, a person's status as a permanent resident by descent can only be established by holding a one way permit affixed with a certificate of entitlement. None of the applicants held such a permit, let alone a permit which was so affixed. By virtue of section 2AA(2) of the No 3 Ordinance, the Director argued that the applicants should be regarded as not enjoying the right of abode.

The CFA unanimously decided the applicants were Hong Kong permanent residents at birth. The CFA overturned the Court of Appeal's judgment on the No 3 Ordinance; provisions requiring one-way permits issued by mainland authorities as a condition for exercising the "core" constitutional right of the right of abode were held unconstitutional. Provisions in the Immigration (Amendment) (No 3) Ordinance 1997 created new criminal offences, including offences relating to the making of an application for a certificate of entitlement for reward; the Court held retrospective provisions on certificates of entitlement were unconstitutional and declared the provisions null and void.

=== Jurisdiction of constitutional review ===
Before the CFA reviewed the constitutionality of the No 2 and No 3 Ordinances, the CFA stated its position as to the constitutional jurisdiction of the HKSAR and decided on the conditions for referring to the Standing Committee of the National People's Congress interpretation of Basic Law provisions before deciding on cases.

The CFA held that, with regards to the power of constitutional review of local Hong Kong legislation, the courts of the HKSAR have a duty to enforce and interpret that Law in exercising their judicial power conferred by the Basic Law. They have the jurisdiction to examine whether legislation enacted by the legislature of the Region or acts of the executive authorities of the Region are consistent with the Basic Law and, if found to be inconsistent, to hold them to be invalid. The CFA considered the exercise of its jurisdiction is a matter of obligation, not of discretion, so that if inconsistency is established, the courts are bound to hold that a law or executive act is invalid at least to the extent of the inconsistency.

More controversially, the CFA held that courts of the HKSAR have the jurisdiction to examine whether any legislative acts of the National People's Congress (NPC) or the Standing Committee of the National People's Congress (NPCSC) are consistent with the Basic Law and to declare them to be invalid if found to be inconsistent. The rationale was that, the courts of the Region have independent judicial power within the high degree of autonomy conferred on the HKSAR under the Basic Law. It is therefore for the courts of the HKSAR to determine questions of inconsistency and invalidity when they arise, including the determination of whether an act of the NPC or NPCSC is inconsistent with the Basic Law.

Under Article 158 of the Basic Law, the CFA is required to seek an NPCSC interpretation in adjudicating cases if it needs to interpret "excluded provisions" in the Basic Law concerning (a) affairs which are the responsibility of the Central People's Government, or (b) the relationship between the Central Authorities and the Region, and if such interpretation will affect the judgments on the cases. The CFA decided that it had a duty to make a reference to the Standing Committee according to the Article if two conditions are satisfied:

- the classification condition: the provisions concerned are excluded provisions; and
- the necessity condition: the Court of Final Appeal in adjudicating the case needs to interpret such excluded provisions and such interpretation will affect the judgment on the case.

The CFA decided that it only needs to seek an interpretation if, as a matter of substance, the predominant provision that has to be interpreted in the adjudication of the case is an excluded provision. For Ng Ka Ling v. Director of Immigration, the CFA decided that it need not refer to the NPCSC for interpretation of Article 24(2)(3) of the Basic Law.

=== Approach to Interpretation of the Basic Law ===
The CFA further laid down the proper approach to the interpretation of the Basic Law. The purposive approach was adopted, upon which courts must consider the purpose of the instrument and its relevant provisions as well as the language of its text in the light of the context, context being of particular importance in the interpretation. In relation to provision of rights and freedom of Hong Kong residents, the Court further stipulated a generous interpretation to the provisions in Chapter III of the Basic Law that contain these constitutional guarantees in order to give to Hong Kong residents the full measure of fundamental rights and freedoms so constitutionally guaranteed.

=== Legality of the Provisional Legislative Council ===
The appellants also submitted that the Provisional Legislative Council (PLC) which enacted the No. 2 and No. 3 Ordinances was not a competent legislative body to enact these ordinances since it had no legal basis. The CFA decided that the Preparatory Committee for the Hong Kong Special Administrative Region established the PLC with limited functions and for a limited time as an interim measure in order to fill the legislative vacuum before the first Legislative Council could be formed in accordance with the Basic Law and the NPC Decision on the Method for the Formation of the First Government and the First Legislative Council.

== Clarification ==
The CFA's decision on its jurisdiction of reviewing the constitutionality of NPC or NPCSC acts was severely criticised by Chinese scholars and pro-Beijing factions in Hong Kong. On 7 February 1999, four former Mainland members of the Hong Kong Basic Law Drafting Committee attacked the CFA judgment and stated that it had the effect of placing Hong Kong courts above the NPC, the supreme state organ of power under the Constitution of China, and of turning Hong Kong into an independent political entity. Upon the visit of then-Secretary for Justice Elsie Leung to Beijing, it was reported that Chinese officials also criticised the Statement as unconstitutional and called for its "rectification".

On 24 February 1999, the Director of Immigration controversially filed a motion applying for clarification of the part of the judgment in Ng Ka Ling v Director of Immigration which relates to the NPC and NPCSC, on the ground that the matter was of great constitutional, public and general importance. The CFA invoked its inherent jurisdiction and clarified its judgment on 26 February 1999 in Ng Ka Ling v Director of Immigration (No 2).

In the clarification, the CFA reiterated that the HKSAR courts' judicial power is derived from the Basic Law. Article 158(1) vests the power of interpretation of the Basic Law in the Standing Committee. The courts' jurisdiction to interpret the Basic Law in adjudicating cases is derived by authorization from the NPCSC under Articles 158(2) and 158(3). The CFA also clarified that its judgment on 29 January 1999 did not question the authority of the NPCSC to make an interpretation under Article 158 which would have to be followed by the courts of the HKSAR. The Court accepted that it cannot question the authority of the NPCSC to make an interpretation, or the authority of the NPC or NPCSC to do any act which is in accordance with the provisions of the Basic Law and the procedure therein.

== Effects ==
After the CFA's interpretation of Article 24, then-Secretary for Security Regina Ip warned in the Legislative Council that a total of 1.67 million people could move from mainland China to Hong Kong within 10 years; if all of the 700,000 eligible persons of the first generation were to be admitted within three years, 640 one-way permit holders, on average, would need to be admitted each day. Despite opposition, then-Chief Executive Tung Chee-hwa made a report on 21 May 1999 to the Central People's Government of China in which he requested the Central Government to refer the relevant Basic Law provisions to the NPCSC for interpretation.

On 26 June 1999, the NPCSC responded to the request of the Chief Executive and issued an interpretation of Article 24(2)(3) of the Hong Kong Basic Law. The NPCSC stated that provisions interpreted by the CFA in Ng Ka Ling v Director of Immigration concern affairs which are the responsibility of the Central Authorities and the relationship between the Central Authorities and the Hong Kong Special Administrative Region. The NPCSC also declared that the Court of Final Appeal, before making its judgment, failed to seek an interpretation of the provisions from the NPCSC in accordance with the provisions of Article 158(3) of the Basic Law. In its interpretation of Article 24(3), the NPCSC stated that mainland-born children of Hong Kong permanent residents enjoy the right of abode only if one of their parents had acquired Hong Kong permanent residency at the time of birth of the children.

In effect, the NPCSC interpretation overturned the CFA's decision in Ng Ka Ling v Director of Immigration. An amendment to the Immigration Ordinance moved by the Secretary for Security, encapsulating the NPCSC interpretation, was passed by the Legislative Council in July 1999.
