= Daoud Bokhary =

Hong Kong businessman (born 1920)

- Traditional Chinese: 包大衛
- Simplified Chinese: 包大卫
Transcriptions
Standard Mandarin
- Hanyu Pinyin: Bāo Dàwèi
Yue: Cantonese
- Jyutping: baau1 daai6 wai6

Syed Daoud Shah Bokhary (Urdu: داوود بخاري, Chinese: 包大衛, also spelled Daud Bokhary; born 15 January 1920) is a Hong Kong retired businessman.

== Early life ==
Bokhary was born near Peshawar in the North-West Frontier Province of British India (today part of Pakistan). He served in the British Indian Army for four years as a logistics expert, and came to Hong Kong with the army on the first British ship after the surrender of Japan ended the occupation of Hong Kong. He briefly returned home to run a coal mine, but, fearing for his wife's safety during the independence of Pakistan in 1947, returned to Hong Kong with her and their first son soon after.

== Career in Hong Kong ==
Bokhary began his career in Hong Kong managing a dockside godown, a position he found thanks to his army logistics experience. He received accolades and promotions for his ability to keep his workers happy, and his skilled handling of the growth in ship traffic resulting from the Chinese Communist Party's takeover of Shanghai. He eventually came to manage an entire wharf, and with his increased responsibilities, began taking night classes in accountancy at the University of Hong Kong. He retired from his wharf position in the 1970s.

For his second career, Bokhary went into day trading, and together with his elder son founded his own company, Bokhary Securities; he wanted to be his own boss, and believed that his religion and ethnicity would keep him out of managerial positions at the big financial corporations which then dominated securities trading in Hong Kong.

== Other activities ==
Outside of his work, Bokhary has been engaged in various philanthropic activities. He has paid for the upkeep of a mosque in his hometown in Pakistan, and also served as a treasurer on the council of the Diocesan Girls' School, an Anglican school, and on one occasion helped it out of financial difficulties. He prefers, however, not to have buildings named after him in return for his donations.

== Identity ==
I did very well in my jobs and was very well treated. Hong Kong was a British city and a Chinese city. You cannot concern yourself too much with that sort of thing ... I have always said this to fellow Indians and Pakistanis who complain: 'Nobody invited you here. If you don't like it you can always go straight back home'.

— Daoud Bokhary

Bokhary holds Pakistani nationality. He has been critical of the Pakistani government's corruption and poor governance, noting that overseas Pakistanis like himself achieve successes which they could never match at home due to the lack of an environment which rewards hard work. When asked by a journalist whether he invested in Pakistan, he reportedly responded, "Having conversed with me for an hour, do you really take me to be such a damned fool?"

Though his career development had been limited by his ethnic background, Bokhary has taken a philosophical attitude towards the discrimination that he and other South Asians in Hong Kong had faced, and has felt grateful for being allowed to settle in Hong Kong. He also has admonished younger South Asian immigrants for their anti-discrimination activism, suggesting that they would feel less affected by racism if they focused more on learning about religion.

== Family ==
Bokhary's wife died in the 1970s. He formerly owned land in Peshawar near his hometown, but sold it when he realised that neither he nor his sons wanted to settle in Pakistan.

Syed Bagh Ali Shah Bokhary is Daoud Bokhary's eldest son. He inherited the brokerage business when his father retired. Bagh Ali's daughter Amina Mariam Bokhary was notable for her legal problems in Hong Kong.

Daoud Bokhary's youngest son Syed Kemal Shah Bokhary was one of the permanent judges in the Hong Kong Court of Final Appeal from 1997 to 2012.
