= Charles Ching =

Judge in Hong Kong

The Honourable Charles Ching GBM QC SC
- 沈澄

Permanent Judge of the Court of Final Appeal
- In office 1 July 1997 – 6 October 2000 Serving with Henry Litton (1997–2000), Kemal Bokhary and Patrick Chan (2000)
- Chief Justice: Andrew Li
- Preceded by: Court Established
- Succeeded by: Robert Ribeiro

Chairman of the Hong Kong Bar Association
- In office January 1975 – January 1977
- Preceded by: Archie Zimmern
- Succeeded by: Henry Litton

Personal details
- Born: 7 October 1935 Hong Kong
- Died: 30 November 2000 (aged 65) Hong Kong
- Education: King's College, Taunton
- Alma mater: University College, Oxford (MA)
- Occupation: Barrister-at-law

Charles Arthur Ching GBM QC SC (Chinese: 沈澄, 7 October 1935–30 November 2000) was a judge in Hong Kong.

Born Charles Arthur Ching into an intellectual family in Hong Kong, Ching was educated in Hong Kong and England. He was a scholar both at King's College, Taunton and at University College, Oxford, where he graduated with honours in jurisprudence.

After passing his bar exam in 1959, Ching commenced his practice of law in Hong Kong, and was appointed Queen's Counsel in 1974. During this period, he was regarded by some as the most successful barrister in Hong Kong's history.

Ching was later appointed to the Court of Appeal in 1995 and the Court of Final Appeal in 1997, where he served with distinction. He resigned in 2000 for health reasons and died soon after. A scholarship named after him was set up by the Hong Kong Bar Association. Throughout his career both as advocate and as judge Mr. Justice Ching was an advocate for the merging of the legal professions in Hong Kong (barristers and solicitors).

Legal offices
Preceded by Archie Zimmern	Chairman of Hong Kong Bar Association; 1975–1977	Succeeded by Henry Litton
New office	Permanent Judge of the Court of Final Appeal; 1997–2000; Served alongside: Henry Litton (1997–2000), Kemal Bokhary, Patrick Chan (2000)	Succeeded by Robert Ribeiro
