= Anthony Yuen =

American editor

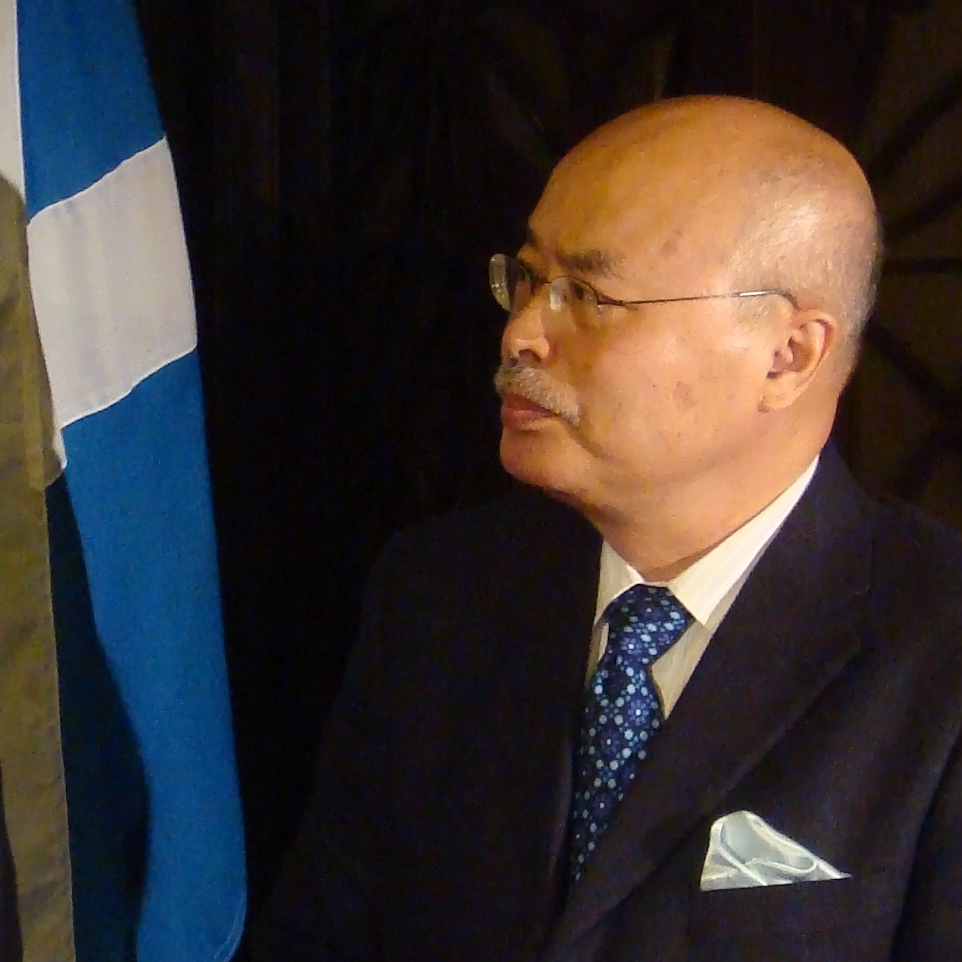
Anthony Yuen during 'Talk with World Leaders'

Anthony Yuen (Chinese: 阮次山; pinyin: Ruǎn Cìshān; 1946–2020) was a Chinese American editor and anchor on the Hong Kong–based television and media station Phoenix Television. He was also a columnist on Singapore's Lianhe Zaobao.

== Early life ==
Yuen was born in Guangxi then moved to Hainan, finally to Taiwan with his father soon after his birth. He graduated with a degree in journalism from Taiwan's National Chengchi University in 1974, and later attained a master's degree from St John's University in New York City.

== Career ==
He worked at the Broadcasting Corporation of China and Taiwan News in Taiwan, as well as several Chinese newspapers in the United States, before becoming editor in chief and current affairs anchor of the Chinese news channel Phoenix Television in 2001.
