= Denis Chang =

Hong Kong barrister and politician

Denis Chang Khen-lee 張健利

Member of the Executive Council
- In office 1992–1997
- Appointed by: Chris Patten

Personal details
- Born: 15 February 1944 (age 82) Sabah, Malaysia
- Party: Article 45 Concern Group (2003–06); Civic Party (2006–)
- Spouse: Agnes Lee
- Children: 2
- Education: St Joseph's School, Kuching Sarawak (1963); Bristol University (1967); Lincoln's Inn (1968)
- Occupation: Barrister-at-law

Denis Chang Khen-lee, CBE, KC, SC, JP (born 15 February 1944, Sabah, Malaysia —) is a barrister and politician from Hong Kong.

He was previously an appointed unofficial member of the Executive Council of Hong Kong (1992—97).

He was also the chairman of the Hong Kong Bar Association (1985—87), the founding member of the pro-democratic group Article 45 Concern Group and became the member of the Civic Party when the group transformed into party.

He is the Chairman of Editorial Board of Hong Kong Law Journal.

== Denis Chang's Chambers ==
Chang formed his own chambers in 1978, and since then, a number of prominent barristers have been tenants.

=== Notable alumni ===
- Johannes Chan SC (Hon.) — first and only honorary academic Senior Counsel in Hong Kong, specializing in public law and human rights
- Philip Dykes SC — former Hong Kong Bar Association chairman (2005–06, 2018–20)
- Paul Harris SC — former Hong Kong Bar Association chairman (2021)
- Jacqueline Leong KC SC — former Hong Kong Bar Association chairman (1992–93)
- Hectar Pun SC — prominent public and constitutional law barrister
- Joseph Tse SC — prominent criminal barrister
