= Right of abode in Hong Kong =

Right to live in Hong Kong

- Traditional Chinese: 香港居留權
- Simplified Chinese: 香港居留权
Transcriptions
Standard Mandarin
- Hanyu Pinyin: Xiānggǎng Jūliúquán
Yue: Cantonese
- Jyutping: hoeng1 gong2 geoi1 lau4 kyun4

Right of abode in Hong Kong entitles a person to live and work in the territory without any restrictions or conditions of stay. Someone who has that right is a Hong Kong permanent resident. Foreign nationals (with infamous exception against domestic helpers) may acquire the right of abode after meeting a seven-year residency requirement and are given most rights usually associated with citizenship, including the right to vote in regional elections. However, they are not entitled to hold territorial passports or stand for office in some Legislative Council constituencies, unless they also naturalise as Chinese citizens.

As a special administrative region of China, Hong Kong does not have its own nationality law and natural-born residents are generally Chinese citizens. Prior to 1997, the territory was a colony of the United Kingdom and right of abode was tied to British nationality law. Although Hong Kong, mainland China, and Macau constitute a single country, local residents with Chinese citizenship do not have automatic residence rights in either of the other two jurisdictions, which both control immigration separately. Similarly, mainland Chinese and Macanese residents do not automatically have residence or employment rights in Hong Kong.

== History ==
=== Colonial era policy ===
Hong Kong was a British colony from 1842 until its transfer to China in 1997. Accordingly, regulations on local residence rights were closely tied to British nationality law during colonial rule. All British subjects previously had unrestricted access to live and work in any British territory. Parliament gradually restricted this from 1962 to 1971, when subjects originating from outside of the British Islands first had immigration controls imposed on them when entering the United Kingdom. Hong Kong followed suit and imposed greater restrictions on subjects from outside the territory. British subjects born in the colony were given belonger status, to indicate their possession of right of abode in Hong Kong. Nationality law reform in 1981 reclassified the vast majority of Hong Kong belongers as British Dependent Territories citizens (BDTCs).

The border between Hong Kong and mainland China was not regulated for over 100 years after establishment of the colony. Border controls did not exist until 1950, after communist victory in the Chinese Civil War. Although the border was guarded, the Hong Kong government was relatively lax in deporting illegal immigrants due to a shortage of unskilled labour within the territory, allowing large numbers of them to register as residents. Still, colonial authorities held almost unlimited discretionary deportation powers over Chinese migrants until 1971, when those resident in the territory for more than seven years were given the right to land. This exempted them from immigration control, though they could still be deported for serious crimes. Immigration became more restricted in 1974 at the start of the Touch Base Policy. Under this system, illegal immigrants captured by law enforcement were immediately deported but those who had managed to reach urban areas of Hong Kong and found housing accommodation were given legal status. This policy ended in 1980, after which all free migration was stopped.

Chinese migrants moving to Hong Kong forfeited their hukou in mainland China and became ineligible for Chinese passports. These individuals were treated as if they were stateless. The colonial government issued Documents of Identity as travel documents to those who could not obtain passports. After seven years of residence, they were issued Certificates of Identity (CIs).

=== Transitionary arrangements ===
The British and Chinese governments entered negotiations over the future of Hong Kong in the early 1980s and agreed on the Sino-British Joint Declaration in 1984. The basic principles for the right of abode are set as part of this treaty and further defined in the Hong Kong Basic Law in Article 24, which encompass the right to land with the added entitlement that a bearer cannot be deported. Belonger status was renamed permanent resident status in 1987, when landed Chinese residents were given the right of abode along with Hong Kong BDTCs. All BDTCs who did not have a connection with a remaining British Dependent Territory other than Hong Kong lost BDTC status on 1 July 1997. Former ethnic Chinese BDTCs became Chinese nationals and could only retain British nationality if they had registered as British Nationals (Overseas) prior to the transfer of sovereignty. Individuals who were not ethnically Chinese, had not registered as BN(O)s, and would have been stateless at that date automatically became British Overseas citizens. Holders of CIs were able to replace them with Hong Kong Special Administrative Region passports after the handover.

== Acquisition and loss ==
How an individual could acquire (or lose) his or her right of abode in Hong Kong depends on his or her nationality.

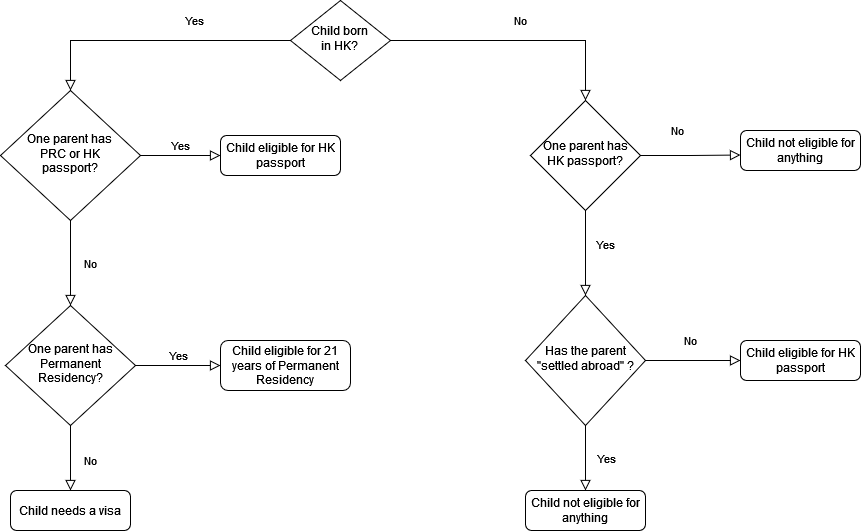
Flowchart to determine Right of Abode

=== Acquisition ===
Acquisition by birth operates on a modified jus soli basis; Chinese nationals born in Hong Kong are automatically permanent residents, while foreign nationals must have at least one parent who possesses right of abode. Children born outside of Hong Kong acquire right of abode if they are also Chinese nationals at birth. Chinese nationality is usually conferred by descent to children born abroad, unless the parents have obtained permanent residency in another country or foreign citizenship. However, while Chinese nationals born in mainland China to Hong Kong permanent resident parents do have right of abode, they must first be approved for One-way Permits by mainland authorities before claiming permanent residency. Residents of Macau also do not have automatic right of entry into Hong Kong.

Non-residents seeking to apply to become permanent residents must have ordinarily resided in Hong Kong for a continuous period of at least seven years. Ordinarily resident in this context excludes certain classes of people, including central government officials, foreign domestic helpers, and incarcerated individuals. Chinese nationals may qualify using any seven-year residence period, while foreigners are only eligible on the basis of the seven years immediately preceding their applications. Individuals from mainland China seeking to settle in Hong Kong are additionally subject to emigration control by the central government.

=== Loss ===
Permanent residents who are not Chinese nationals will automatically lose their right of abode if they have been absent from Hong Kong for more than 36 months after they ceased to have ordinarily resided in Hong Kong. These individuals are then given the right to land, which also allows them unrestricted access to live and work in the territory. Foreign permanent residents can naturalise as Chinese nationals and become exempt from automatic loss, but are required to renounce their previous nationality on successful application. Children with foreign nationality who were born in Hong Kong and have permanent residency by descent also automatically lose right of abode at age 21 and are given the right to land. They may subsequently reapply for right of abode on the basis of a seven-year residence period. Chinese nationals with right of abode may only be deprived of the status if they lose their Chinese nationality.

Prior to 1997, acquisition of the right of abode was dependent on British nationality. Individuals born overseas to Hong Kong-connected BDTCs also became BDTCs and Hong Kong permanent residents by descent. After the transfer of sovereignty, if these individuals did not also acquire Chinese nationality or return to Hong Kong within three years, they would be nonpermanent residents with the right to land.

Individuals who lost permanent resident status before 1997 can immediately resume the right of abode under limited circumstances. Those who returned to settle in Hong Kong within 18 months after the transfer of sovereignty were automatically regranted the status, while former residents who return after that period can only immediately regain the right of abode if they have not been absent from the territory for any period longer than three years.

== Rights and restrictions ==
Permanent residents have the unrestricted right to live and work in Hong Kong and cannot be deported from the territory, regardless of their nationality. They are required to register for Hong Kong permanent identity cards (as opposed to standard identity cards which are issued to any person admitted to the territory for more than 180 days), eligible for welfare benefits, and able to vote in regional elections. Chinese nationals with territorial right of abode are eligible to hold Hong Kong Special Administrative Region passports, which are different from those issued to mainland residents. Those who additionally do not possess right of abode in foreign countries may stand for office in geographical constituencies of the Legislative Council and can serve as principal officials of the government. A limited number of residents with foreign nationality or right of abode in other countries may be elected to functional constituency seats in the legislature.

According to Article 99 of the Hong Kong Basic Law, public servants serving in all government departments of the HKSAR must be permanent residents of the HKSAR except where otherwise provided for in Article 101, however, there is no stipulated requirement about the nationality or passport of a civil servant.

Hong Kong permanent residents do not have automatic residence or employment rights in mainland China. The central government issues Home Return Permits to residents who are Chinese citizens for travel purposes and Residence Permits if they intend to reside or work in the mainland for longer than six months. Hong Kong permanent residents are also subject to immigration controls in Macau, and must obtain residence permits if living there for more than one year.

== Legal challenges to eligibility requirements ==
The eligibility criteria for right of abode has been a contentious issue and repeatedly challenged in court since the transfer of sovereignty. Because constitutional issues require central government review, litigation on right of abode issues has highlighted conflicting differences between the legal systems of the territory and mainland and xenophobic sentiment among local residents.

=== Children born in mainland China ===
In 1999, the Court of Final Appeal (CFA) issued two judgements that granted right of abode in Hong Kong to children born in mainland China with at least one parent who had the right of abode, including those whose parents had become a permanent resident after the time of birth. The regional government expected that 1.67 million new immigrants from the mainland would seek to acquire the right of abode on these terms over the next decade, and projected that Hong Kong would not be able to absorb such a sudden population increase. Although the CFA is the highest territorial court, the Court clarified that its authority to interpret the Basic Law derives from the Standing Committee of the National People's Congress (NPCSC). The government subsequently asked the Standing Committee to provide a new interpretation of Basic Law Article 24, which defines right of abode eligibility, and Article 22, which stipulates that people from other parts of China are required to seek central government approval before entering Hong Kong. The NPCSC duly issued an interpretation that reinforced requirements for mainland exit procedures and restricted eligibility for right of abode to the criteria as it was before the CFA rulings. The CFA confirmed its effect in local law in Lau Kong Yung v Director of Immigration.

While the interpretation resolved the immediate immigration crisis, the constitutionality and legality of bypassing the Court of Final Appeal was widely debated. Many legislators, especially the pro-democracy camp, and the Hong Kong Bar Association believed that amending the Basic Law would have been the appropriate course of remedy. They argued that arbitrary NPCSC interpretations without formal requests for them from the CFA would weaken the principle of "one country, two systems", damage the rule of law, and erode the authority of the CFA as the territory's final appellate court. Although constitutional judicial review is routine in common law systems, Beijing viewed the process as a limit to its authority as the sovereign power and preferred more flexible interpretation of the law. Additionally, the regional government believed that revising the Basic Law would delay resolving the issue for too long since amendments require review by the entire National People's Congress, which only meets once each spring.

=== Children of mainland visitors ===
The Court of Final Appeal issued a further ruling in 2001 that all Chinese nationals born in Hong Kong would have right of abode in the region, even if neither parent was a permanent resident. This change directly led to a growing trend of birth tourism; increasing numbers of expectant mothers from the mainland entered Hong Kong to give birth with the express purpose of exploiting the healthcare system and giving their children permanent residency in the territory. Overcrowding in hospital maternity wards became a major factor in contributing to growing consternation among residents and the emergence of a hostile environment against mainland tourists.

=== Foreign domestic helpers ===
Foreign domestic helpers (FDHs), live-in female household workers mostly from the Philippines or Indonesia, constitute the largest non-Chinese minority group in Hong Kong. They are not considered ordinarily resident in the territory and cannot claim permanent residency. Racial tension between these workers and local residents, pervasive perceptions of FDHs as being lower class, and a general public unwillingness to integrate them led some FDHs to more actively protest their disadvantaged legal status. However, in 2013, the Court of Final Appeal upheld existing government exclusion of FDHs from right of abode eligibility in Vallejos v Commissioner of Registration. A majority of Hongkongers did not support the extension of residency rights to this minority group, fearing an increase in government spending to accommodate them. The current regulatory environment for FDHs, including the lack of access to right of abode, continues to be criticised for making this class of minorities particularly vulnerable to domestic exploitation and abuse.

== See also ==
- Hukou
- Right of abode in Macau
- Right of abode in the United Kingdom
