= Hong Kong Bar Association =

Regulatory body for barristers in Hong Kong

- 香港大律師公會
- Formation: 12 March 1948; 78 years ago
- Legal status: Society under the Societies Ordinance
- Headquarters: LG2, High Court, 38 Queensway, Hong Kong
- Region served: Hong Kong
- Chairman: Jose-Antonio Maurellet
- Website: hkba.org

Hong Kong Bar Association
- Traditional Chinese: 香港大律師公會
- Simplified Chinese: 香港大律师公会
Transcriptions
Standard Mandarin
- Hanyu Pinyin: Xiānggǎng Dàlǜshī Gōnghuì
Yue: Cantonese
- Yale Romanization: Hēung góng daaih leuht sī gūng wúi
- Jyutping: Hoeng1 gong2 daai6 loet6 si1 gung1 wui2

The Hong Kong Bar Association (HKBA) is the professional regulatory body for barristers in Hong Kong. The Law Society of Hong Kong is the equivalent association for solicitors in Hong Kong.

Jose-Antonio Maurellet is the current chairman of the Council of the HKBA.

== History ==
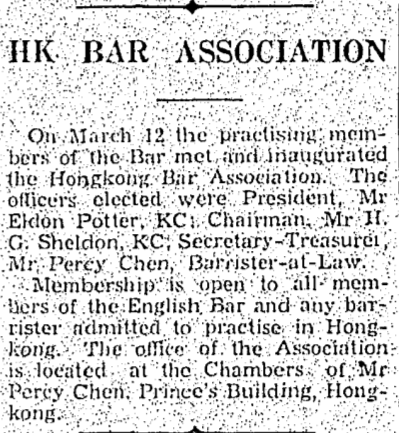
Advertisement announcing the formation of the Hong Kong Bar Association in March 1948

According to its website, the Hong Kong Bar Association was founded in 1949. However, a newspaper advertisement from March 1948 records the foundation of the association on 12 March 1948 with Mr Eldon Potter KC being elected president, Mr H.G. Sheldon KC being elected chairman and Mr Percy Chen being elected Secretary Treasurer. The offices of the Association were located in the offices of Mr Chen in Prince's Building, Hong Kong.

The 1949 date is likely the date on which the Association was registered under the Societies Ordinance (Registration No. 1971) which had been enacted in that year to require registration of all societies.

== Role ==
The objects of the Hong Kong Bar Association are generally to consider and to take proper action on all matters affecting the legal profession and the administration of justice. These include:

- the maintenance of the honour and independence of the Bar;
- the improvement of the administration of justice in Hong Kong;
- the prescribing of rules of professional conduct, discipline and etiquette;
- furtherance of good relations and understanding within the legal profession.

Like other professional bodies, the HKBA has the authority to take disciplinary action to the members who breach the Code of Conduct of the Association. The Law Society of Hong Kong is the equivalent association for solicitors in Hong Kong.

The Director of Administration and Development of the Hong Kong Bar Association is Ms. Susie HO, according to a document from the Hong Kong Legislative Council. The Hong Kong Bar Association (HKBA) is served by a secretariat headed by an Administrator, currently Ms. Dora Chan, according to a LAWASIA report.

== Route to entry ==
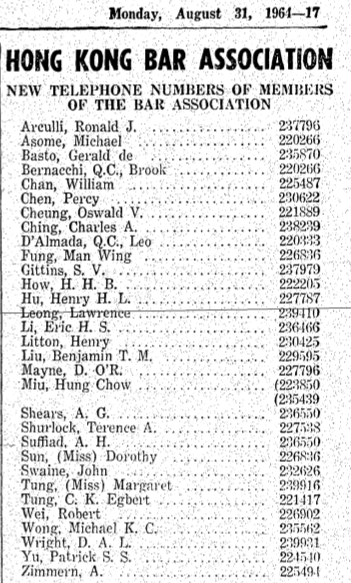
List of members of the Hong Kong Bar Association in 1964

Students must first complete a basic degree in law, such as the Bachelor of Laws (LLB), Juris Doctor (JD) or convert from another first degree with the Common Professional Examination (CPE).

They must then complete the Postgraduate Certificate in Laws (PCLL) at The University of Hong Kong, the City University of Hong Kong or The Chinese University of Hong Kong. From 2008 onwards, all overseas applicants to the PCLL must satisfy each element of the PCLL conversion programme.

After finishing PCLL, prospective barristers will enter pupillage with a pupilmaster for a year; after half a year they will gain rights of audience in court.

Overseas barristers may, having at least three years' experience, take the Barristers Qualification Examination to officially become a Hong Kong barrister.

Additionally, Hong Kong qualified solicitors of at least three years' qualified experience may apply to be admitted as a barrister. However, one may not be both a barrister and solicitor at the same time and are required to remove themselves from the roll of solicitors before admission as a barrister. For example, the No. 1 ranked barrister in seniority in 2007, Sir John Swaine SC, switched to become a solicitor in 2002, but switched back in 2004. Solicitors seeking to qualify as barrister are required to do pupillage, however, the period may be shortened for those with substantial advocacy experience.

== Number of practising barristers ==
As of October 2026, there were 109 Senior Counsel (91 male, 18 female; 83.5%/16.5%), and 1,709 (1,142 male, 567 female; 66%/34%) junior barristers in practice at the private bar in Hong Kong. There were 69 pupil barristers of whom 34 were male and 35 female (49/51%).

== Senior Counsel ==
After gaining ten years' experience as a barrister or government counsel in Hong Kong, a barrister admitted in Hong Kong may apply to become a Senior Counsel (SC) (資深大律師). Time in practice as a barrister or lawyer in another jurisdiction or as a solicitor in private practice in Hong Kong does not count. The Law Society of Hong Kong has called on a number of occasions for this to be changed, so that solicitors may also be appointed Senior Counsel. The most recent occasion was in September 2026.. This was dismissed by the Bar Association as "premature and large academic", saying most solicitor advocates had not exercised higher rights of audience in the past 2 years and on the basis that there were very few cases where solicitor advocates were instructed to appear by other firms.

== List of chairpersons ==
	Portrait	Chairman		Chinese	Year	Notes
1		Harold Sheldon	KC		1948; 1949	Eldon Potter, KC as president in 1948
2		Charles Loseby	KC		1950	
3		Leo d'Almada e Castro	KC	廖亞利孖打	1951	
4		John McNeill	KC/QC		1952	
(2)		Charles Loseby	QC		1953	
(3)		Leo d'Almada e Castro	QC	廖亞利孖打	1954	
(4)		John McNeill	QC		1955; 1956	
(3)		Leo d'Almada e Castro	QC	廖亞利孖打	1957	
(4)		John McNeill	QC		1958	
(3)		Leo d'Almada e Castro	QC	廖亞利孖打	1959	
5		Lo Hin-shing		羅顯勝	1960	
(3)		Leo d'Almada e Castro	QC	廖亞利孖打	1961; 1962	
6		Brook Bernacchi	QC	貝納祺	1963	
7		S.V. Gittins			1964; 1965	
8		Oswald Cheung	QC	張奧偉	1966	
(7)		S.V. Gittins	QC		1967	
9		Gerald de Basto	QC		1968; 1969; 1970	
10		Henry Litton	QC	烈顯倫	1971; 1972	
(9)		Gerald de Basto	QC		1973	
11		Archie Zimmern	QC		1974	
12		Charles Ching	QC	沈澄	1975; 1976	
(10)		Henry Litton	QC	烈顯倫	1977; 1978; 1979	
13		Martin Lee Chu-ming	QC	李柱銘	1980; 1981; 1982	
(10)		Henry Litton	QC	烈顯倫	1983; 1984	
14		Denis Chang Khen-lee	QC	張健利	1985; 1986; 1987	
15		Robert Tang Ching	QC	鄧楨	1988; 1989	
16		Anthony Rogers	QC		1990; 1991	
17		Jacqueline Leong	QC	梁冰濂	1992; 1993	
18		Ronny Wong Fook-hum	QC	黃福鑫	1994	
19		Gladys Li Chi-hei	QC	李志喜	1995; 1996	
20		Audrey Eu Yuet-mee	QC/SC	余若薇	1997; 1998	
21		Ronny Tong Ka-wah	SC	湯家驊	1999; 2000	
22		Alan Leong	SC	梁家傑	2001; 2002	
23		Edward Chan King-sang	SC	陳景生	2003; 2004	
24		Philip Dykes	QC/SC	戴啟思	2005; 2006	
25		Rimsky Yuen Kwok-keung	SC	袁國強	2007; 2008	
26		Russell Coleman	SC	高浩文	2009; 2010	
27		Kumar Ramanathan	SC	林孟達	2011; 2012	
28		Paul Shieh Wing-tai	SC	石永泰	2013; 2014	
29		Winnie Tam	SC	譚允芝	2015; 2016	
30		Paul Lam Ting-kwok	SC	林定國	2017	
(24)		Philip Dykes	QC/SC	戴啟思	2018; 2019; 2020	
31		Paul Harris	SC	夏博義	2021	
32		Victor Dawes	SC	杜淦堃	2022; 2023 2024	
33		Jose-Antonio Maurellet	SC	毛樂禮	2025 2026	

== Notable cases and statements ==
=== Input in the 2010 Hong Kong electoral reform ===
The Bar reiterated their call for the abolition of functional constituencies as being non-compliant with international law – Article 25(b) of the International Covenant on Civil and Political Rights and Article 21 of the Bill of Rights. They urged the government to put forward a revised consultation document with more progressive proposals, a clear road map on the way forward, and a commitment to abolish functional constituencies. The Bar Association said that corporate or directors' voting was also incompatible with international law; they said the failure to comply is not mitigated by replacing corporate voting by an authorised representative with voting by directors, executives, member associations, individual members.

=== Comments on Guangzhou–Shenzhen–Hong Kong Express Rail Link Co-location arrangement ===
The Bar Association criticised the arrangement for distortion of the Basic Law, stating it damages the rule of law in Hong Kong as Article 18 was clearly written and leaves no room for any interpretation which would allow Chinese law to apply in any certain part of HKSAR. Carrie Lam defended the arrangement and responded by stating that "some Hong Kong legal professionals have an elitist mentality or double standards, that is, they think that Hong Kong’s legal system is supreme, and that the mainland legal system – a big country with a 1.3 billion population – is wrong." Her statement prompted widespread disbelief in Hong Kong.

=== Concerns about Hong Kong's National Security Law ===
The association was quoted saying it was "gravely concerned with both the contents of the [national security law] and the manner of its introduction." The statement noted that the law was enacted in a way that prevented the city's lawyers, judges, police and residents from understanding its contents in any way prior to its coming into force.

=== Admission of overseas counsel for Jimmy Lai ===
In September 2022, the HKBA (along with the Secretary for Justice) opposed an application by Jimmy Lai to hire a King's Counsel in the UK to represent him in his trial in Hong Kong, stating that "the well established criteria for admitting overseas counsel on an ad hoc basis are not met."

In November 2022, after the Hong Kong Court of Final Appeal ruled to allow Tim Owen KC to be admitted as an overseas counsel on an ad hoc basis, the Chief Executive of Hong Kong, John Lee, made a request to the NPCSC for an interpretation of the national security law over whether overseas counsel are allowed to take part in national security cases.

The former HKBA chairman Victor Dawes, SC said at a media briefing that "the national security law is a relatively new piece of legislation and we hope that any ambiguity can be clarified by our courts in the future and the power to interpret… be exercised sparingly" whilst noting that "I do understand the government's position and the reasoning given by the chief executive." He dismissed suggestions that disallowing overseas barristers in national security cases would undermine defendants' rights and freedom in legal representation, saying there are sufficient lawyers in the city to handle such cases. Referring to Lai's case, Dawes claimed that an overseas lawyer would not contribute much. Dawes also said that the incident would not damage Hong Kong's judicial independence.

=== Tanya Chan ===
In April 2023, the HKBA censured former barrister and Legislative Council member Tanya Chan over her involvement in the Umbrella Movement. The complainant was anonymous.

=== National security law judges ===
In May 2023, the HKBA expressed "grave concerns" over the US Congressional-Executive Commission on China, which asked for judges in national security cases to be sanctioned. The HKBA said "The Bar stresses once again that there is no basis at all to call into question the integrity and independence of Hong Kong judges..." and that calls to do so "must be sternly deplored and condemned."

=== Resignations of foreign judges ===
In June 2024, after two foreign judges on the Court of Final Appeal resigned, the HKBA said "the Bar strongly believes that their resignations will not affect the ability of our apex court in discharging its judicial functions and has every confidence in the independence of our judicial system." In contrast, one of the judges who resigned said that judges' freedoms had been "severely limited" and that "The rule of law is profoundly compromised in any area about which the government feels strongly."

== See also ==
- Law Society of Hong Kong
- Bar association
- Bar council
- Postgraduate Certificate in Laws
