= Andrew Li =

Hong Kong judge (born 1948)

The Honourable Andrew Li Kwok-nang GBM CBE KC SC JP
- 李國能

1st Chief Justice of the Court of Final Appeal
- In office 1 July 1997 – 31 August 2010
- Appointed by: Tung Chee-Hwa
- Succeeded by: Geoffrey Ma

Deputy High Court Judge
- In office 1991–1997

Deputy Judge of the District Court
- In office 1982–1985

Member of the Executive Council of Hong Kong
- In office October 1992 – 1996

Personal details
- Born: December 1948 (age 77) British Hong Kong
- Education: Fitzwilliam College, Cambridge (MA, LL.M)

Andrew Li Kwok-nang
- Traditional Chinese: 李國能
- Simplified Chinese: 李国能
Transcriptions
Standard Mandarin
- Hanyu Pinyin: Lǐ Guónéng
Yue: Cantonese
- Jyutping: lei5 gwok3 nang4

Andrew Li Kwok-nang GBM CBE KC SC JP (Chinese: 李國能; born December 1948) is a retired Hong Kong judge, and a former Chief Justice of Hong Kong, who was the first to preside over the Hong Kong Court of Final Appeal, established on 1 July 1997. Li was succeeded by Geoffrey Ma on 1 September 2010.

Li was born in Hong Kong and educated locally and in England. A graduate of the University of Cambridge, Li practised as a barrister in Hong Kong until his appointment as Chief Justice. During his 13 years as Chief Justice, Li handled a variety of important appellate cases and was known for his moderate jurisprudence and visionary leadership. He has remained active in public service since his retirement.

== Early life and education ==
Born in Hong Kong, Andrew Li received his early education at St. Paul's Co-educational College, and then at Repton School in Derbyshire, England. He earned an MA and LLM from Fitzwilliam College, Cambridge.

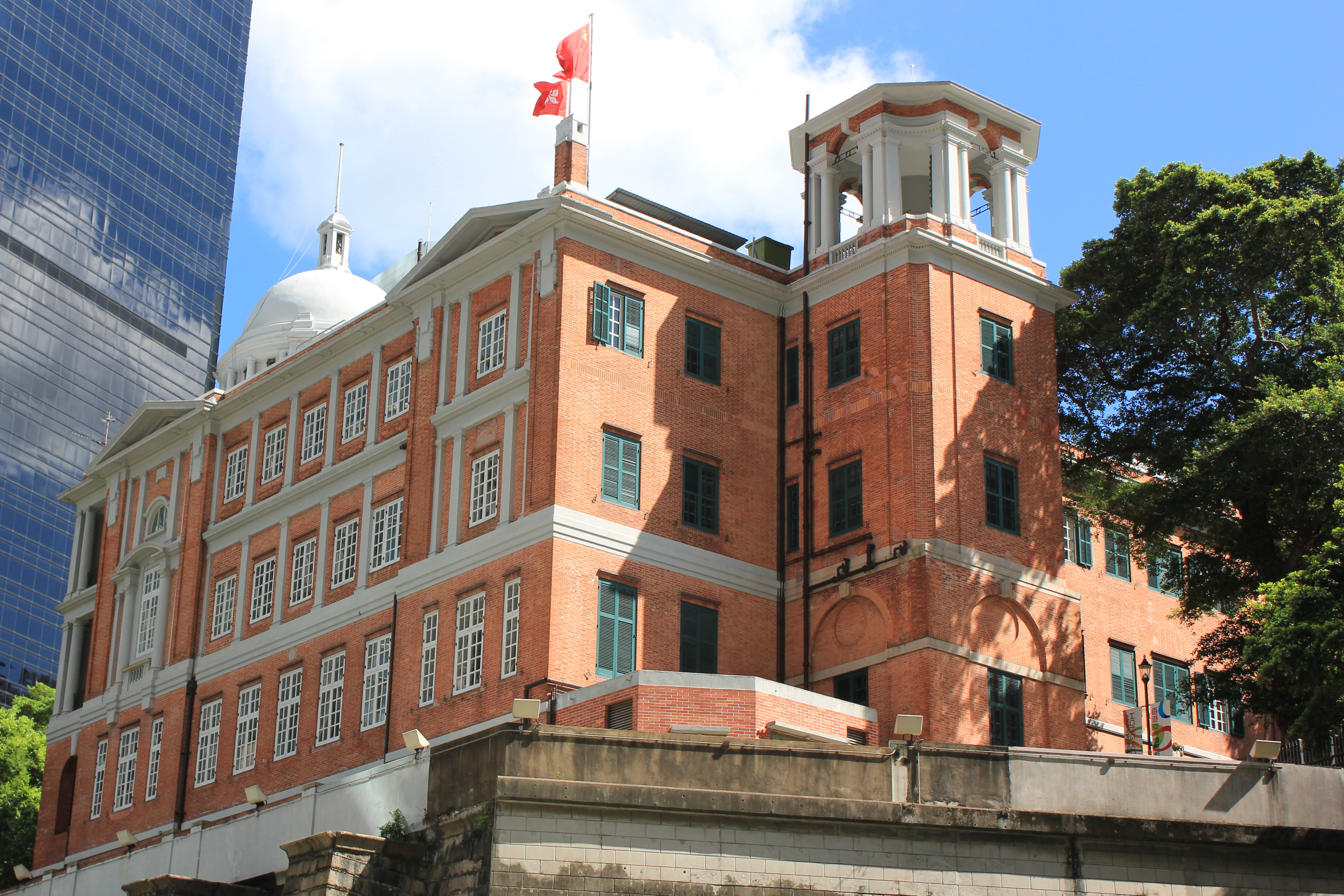
The Former French Mission Building, used as the Court of Final Appeal of Hong Kong during Li's tenure as Chief Justice

== Legal career ==
Li was called to the Middle Temple in 1970, and the Hong Kong Bar in 1973. He served pupillage under Peter Millett, later Lord Millett.

His first ever pupil was Audrey Eu, who commenced her pupillage in 1978. Her brother and senior counsel Benjamin Yu was also Li's pupil. Former Secretary for Justice Wong Yan Lung was Li's last pupil. In 1988, he was appointed Queen's Counsel.

He was appointed as Deputy Judge of the District Court of Hong Kong in 1982, later Deputy High Court Judge in 1991. In 1997, Li was appointed as the Chief Justice of the Court of Final Appeal by Tung Chee-Hwa, the first Chief Executive of the Hong Kong Special Administrative Region after the handover. As Chief Justice, he presided in the Court of Final Appeal and was Head of the Judiciary charged with its administration. He served for 13 years until his retirement in 2010.

Li has been lauded for visionary leadership as Chief Justice. He has left "an indelible mark in the annals of the history of the HKSAR." He was "the main impetus" in the development of the Court of Final Appeal, where he developed a moderate jurisprudence and was a consensus builder. Lord Millett, who served alongside Li as a non-permanent judge of the Court of Final Appeal, described Li as "[certainly] the wisest" member of the court.

In 1999, he gave the leading judgment in Ng Ka Ling and Others v. Director of Immigration, which was at the centre of the right of abode controversy.

In 2000, Li set up a working party, consisting of judges, lawyers and academics, to introduce reforms on minimising the complexity of High Court civil litigation procedures, widening judges' discretionary powers to manage the progress of cases and requiring lawyers to justify their charges. An interim report was released in 2001, containing 80 recommendations, some of which mirror those in the Woolf Reforms in England. Known as the Civil Justice Reform, the final report was released on 3 March 2004, setting out 150 recommendations. It has come into effect on 2 April 2009.

Li announced his decision to resign early from his position as Chief Justice on 25 August 2009, ceasing service on 31 August 2010 and commencing pre-retirement leave on 1 September 2010, three years before retirement age. He would leave public life upon retirement. Li's announcement that he intended to take early retirement came as a surprise, prompting widespread speculation that there had been pressure from Beijing, according to the South China Morning Post. Li, however, stressed his retirement was in the best interests of the judiciary and would be conducive to orderly succession planning of the judiciary as three other permanent judges on the Court of Final Appeal were to reach retirement age between 2012 and 2014. He also said the judiciary had been under his leadership for 13 years, which was a long time, and that retirement was consistent with his personal wishes. He dismissed speculation that he resigned due to political pressure.

On 18 February 2010, Li achieved the highest score ever recorded (68.1) by the University of Hong Kong Public Opinion Programme.

On 8 April 2010, it was announced that Chief Executive Donald Tsang had accepted the recommendation of the Judicial Officers Recommendation Commission to appoint Geoffrey Ma as Li's successor. On 9 June 2010, Ma was formally endorsed unanimously by Hong Kong legislators. But pro-democracy members remained concerned at the implications of Li's resignation. Margaret Ng said: "The public is deeply worried that [Li's resignation] signals an era in which judicial independence will gradually yield to the influence and intervention of Beijing...but I believe the challenges have always been there, openly at times, but unceasingly as an undercurrent." Emily Lau said many people were unnerved by Li's decision to resign, and that "Hong Kong cannot afford another surprise resignation."

On 17 July 2010, a farewell ceremony was held for Li. The courtroom was packed by judges and lawyers, including representatives of the Law Society of Hong Kong and the Hong Kong Bar Association.

== Extra-judicial life ==
Li has a long record of public service. He was appointed Justice of the Peace in 1985. In 1992, he was appointed member at-large of the Executive Council of Chris Patten, the last British Governor of Hong Kong, and was appointed Commander of the Order of British Empire (CBE) the same year.

Li had served as Chairman of the Land Development Corporation, Deputy Chairman of the Inland Revenue Board of Review, member of the Securities Commission, the Law Reform Commission, the Standing Committee on Company Law Reform, the Banking Advisory Committee, and the Judicial Services Commission, and Honorary Secretary of the Hong Kong Bar Association. He had also served as steward of the Hong Kong Jockey Club.

On the education front, Li had served as vice-chairman of the Council of the Hong Kong University of Science and Technology and chairman of the university and Polytechnics Grants Committee. He had also served as a trustee of the Friends of Tsinghua University Law School Charitable Trust and as the vice-chairman of the School Council of St. Paul's Co-educational College of Hong Kong.

Li has received numerous awards, including honorary degrees awarded by Hong Kong University of Science and Technology (1993); Baptist University (1994); Open University of Hong Kong (1997); University of Hong Kong (2001); Griffith University (2001), University of New South Wales (2002), University of Technology, Sydney (2005), Chinese University of Hong Kong (2006), Shue Yan University (2009), Lingnan University (2010), City University of Hong Kong (2010), Tsinghua University (2013) and University of Oxford (2013). He was made an Honorary Bencher of the Middle Temple in 1997, an Honorary Fellow of Fitzwilliam College, Cambridge in 1999, and an Honorary Fellow of St Hugh's College, Oxford in 2016.

Li was awarded the Grand Bauhinia Medal by the Hong Kong Government in 2008. He received the Woodrow Wilson Award for Public Service and the Sing Tao Leader of the Year Award in 2010. In the following year, he was made an Honorary Life Member respectively of the Hong Kong Bar Association and of the Law Society of Hong Kong. He is also a Patron of the Bingham Centre for the Rule of Law.

Since his retirement from the post of Chief Justice, Li has devoted himself to education. He is an honorary professor of law at the University of Hong Kong, Chinese University of Hong Kong and the City University of Hong Kong, as well as a visiting professor at Tsinghua University.

In an interview published in early June 2020, Li said about the Hong Kong national security law, whose enactment would follow at the end of the month, that it was understandable for the National People's Congress to enact this legislation, but that "investigatory powers must be governed by Hong Kong law", and that a requirement on national security judges to not have dual or foreign citizenship would be detrimental to judicial independence.

Li is married with two daughters. His wife, Li Woo Mo Ying Judy, is a graduate of the University of Hong Kong (Social Sciences, 1970).

Legal offices
Preceded by Noel Power as Chief Justice of the Supreme Court of Hong Kong; Acting	Chief Justice of the Court of Final Appeal; 1997–2010	Succeeded by Geoffrey Ma
Order of precedence
Preceded by David Li; Recipient of the Grand Bauhinia Medal	Hong Kong order of precedence Recipient of the Grand Bauhinia Medal	Succeeded by Henry Tang; Recipient of the Grand Bauhinia Medal
