= Kemal Bokhary =

Hong Kong judge (born 1947)

The Honourable Kemal Bokhary GBM JP
- 包致金
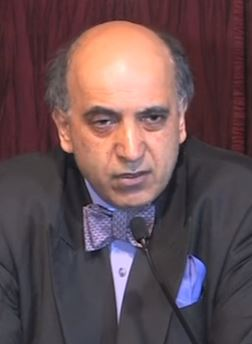

Non-Permanent Judge of the Court of Final Appeal
- Incumbent
- Assumed office 2012

Permanent Judge of the Court of Final Appeal
- In office 1997–2012
- Preceded by: New office
- Succeeded by: Robert Tang

Justice of Appeal of the Court of Appeal of the Supreme Court of Hong Kong
- In office 1993–1997

Judge of the High Court of Justice of the Supreme Court of Hong Kong
- In office 1989–1993
- Appointed by: Sir David Wilson

Justice of the Peace
- In office 1984–1989

Personal details
- Born: 25 October 1947 (age 79) British Hong Kong
- Spouse: Verina Bokhary
- Relations: Amina Mariam Bokhary (niece)
- Children: 3 daughters
- Parent: Daoud Bokhary (father)

Kemal Bokhary
- Chinese: 包致金
Transcriptions
Standard Mandarin
- Hanyu Pinyin: Bāo Zhìjīn
Yue: Cantonese
- Yale Romanization: Bāau Jigām
- Jyutping: baau1 zi3 gam1

Syed Kemal Shah Bokhary GBM JP (Chinese: 包致金; Cantonese Yale: Bāau Jigām; born 25 October 1947) is a judge in Hong Kong. He was one of three Permanent Judges of Hong Kong's Court of Final Appeal from its inception in 1997 until he reached the mandatory retirement age of 65 in October 2012; afterwards, he remained on the bench as a non-permanent judge.

== Early life and family ==
Bokhary's father is Daoud Bokhary, a native of the North-West Frontier Province in the British India (now Pakistan) who came to Hong Kong with the British Indian Army after the Japanese occupation. His mother's family had been in Hong Kong since the 19th century. Bokhary himself was born in Kowloon, Hong Kong in 1947. He received his early education in the King George V School, Hong Kong and his legal education in London. Bokhary is married to former High Court judge Verina Saeeda Bokhary, with whom he has three daughters.

== Career ==
Bokhary was called to the English Bar in 1970 and to the Hong Kong Bar the following year. He went on to establish a successful legal practice in Hong Kong and was appointed Queen's Counsel in 1983. The following year, he also became a Justice of the Peace. In 1989, he was appointed a Judge of the High Court. He came to wide public attention in early 1993 for presiding over an inquest into the New Year's Eve stampede at Lan Kwai Fong, in which 21 people were killed. He was promoted to the Court of Appeal later that year. In 1997, upon the handover of Hong Kong from Britain to the People's Republic of China, Bokhary was appointed a Permanent Judge of the Court of Final Appeal of Hong Kong. He was known for his sense of humour and his talkativeness in court. In 2001, Bokhary was elected a bencher of London's Middle Temple.

Out of the permanent judges of the Court of Final Appeal, Bokhary holds the record for the number of dissenting opinions he has written. He is also described as the "most hard-working" judge; during his thirteen years of tenure, he heard 95% (299) of the 313 cases which came before the Court of Final Appeal, a higher proportion than his colleagues. His frequent dissents were thought by some to be "intellectually superior" to opinions written by other members of the bench, and he was nicknamed the "conscience of the court" due to his tendency to rule in accordance with his sense of justice rather than established principles; he has also been described as the "Lord Denning of Hong Kong" by Martin Lee SC.

Bokhary retired from his position as Permanent Judge on 24 October 2012 upon reaching the retirement age of 65. In remarks upon the occasion, he warned of "a storm of unprecedented ferocity" which threatened the judicial autonomy of Hong Kong. Commenting on the decision not to extend his retirement age, Bokhary suggested that, "If you were asking if I believe that the reason why [my retirement age was not] extended is because of my liberal judgements, then I would tell you that I do believe that." Nevertheless, reflecting on his time on the bench, Bokhary stated that, although opinions between the justices differed on occasion, he never encountered anything less than a highly-cooperative attitude, both at the hearing and judgment-writing stages. He also insisted that Hong Kong judges would always independently apply the law, Beijing's power to interpret the Basic Law notwithstanding: “The very fact that there’s an interpretation [from Beijing] shows you that the court is independent. Because if the courts are not independent, then they could just be told quietly behind the scenes what to do, and they would do it. But everybody knows that’s not how it works in Hong Kong.”

In March 2012, Robert Tang was named as his successor. Bokhary has continued to sit as a Non-Permanent Judge, hearing occasional cases.

Since retirement as a Permanent Judge, Bokhary has published Recollections, a memoir, and the Crocky series, a series of cartoons, reflecting upon his career in the law.

== Quotes ==
- "Humanity is the application." (Lau Kong Yung v. Director of Immigration)
- 'Human rights are aptly named, being basic to and inherent in humankind. ..."have always existed with the human being ... independently of, and before, the State."' (Secretary for Justice v. Yau Yuk Lung Zigo, citing Ethiopia v South Africa; Liberia v South Africa)
- "Of the many and varied purposes for which law is made, none is more important than that of declaring, protecting and realising the full potential of human rights." (Secretary for Justice v. Yau Yuk Lung Zigo)
- "And then I conclude by paying another tribute. It is to the dignity in adversity displayed by all the abode-seekers, including and especially the woman who made every effort to remain composed before ultimately breaking down in tears at the final hearing of this long and sad case. My saying that may only be cold comfort to them. But I consider it right to say it nevertheless." (Ng Siu Tung v. Director of Immigration FACV 1/2001 at para. 55)
- "What is the true scope of the protection conferred by the presumption of innocence? [...] Just because the presumption of innocence is a key component of our criminal justice system, it does not follow that the protection which it confers is strictly confined to criminal proceedings. Such protection obviously extends at least to include civil matters connected with such proceedings. [...] The law moves forward, especially to provide better protection and enforcement of fundamental rights and freedoms. [...] Indifference to a fundamental right or freedom is more insidious – and in that sense can be even more dangerous – than any open derogation from that right or freedom. [...] Threats to fundamental rights and freedoms can come in unpredictable shapes and sizes. A constitution's protection potential must not be cramped. [...] Article 39 of the Basic Law provides that the International Covenant on Economic, Social and Cultural Rights as applied to Hong Kong shall remain in force and be implemented through the laws of Hong Kong." (Yeung Chung Ming v Commissioner of Police FACV 22/2007 at para. 33, 33, 37, 39, 44, 45, 63)
- "This Court is here to do justice." (Tang Siu Man v HKSAR FACC 1/1997 at para. 129)

== Bibliography ==
- Human Rights: Source, Contents and Enforcement (Hong Kong: Sweet & Maxwell – Thomson Reuters, 2015)

Legal offices
New office	Permanent Judge of the Court of Final Appeal; 1997–2012; With: Henry Litton, Charles Ching (1997–2000); Patrick Chan, Robert Ribeiro (2000–2012)	Succeeded by Robert Tang
Order of precedence
Previous: Frank Stock; Non-Permanent Judge of the Court of Final Appeal	Hong Kong order of precedence Non-Permanent Judge of the Court of Final Appeal	Succeeded by Patrick Chan; Non-Permanent Judge of the Court of Final Appeal
