= Timeline of reactions to the 2020 Hong Kong national security law (April 2021) =

Timeline of the 2019–2020 Hong Kong protests
2019			March–June				July	August	September	October	November	December
2020	January	February	March	April	May	June	July	August	September	October	November	December
2021	January	February	March	April	May	June	July	August	September–November			December

The city held its first National Security Education Day after the national security law had come into force. Chief Executive Carrie Lam emphasized that the law had helped Hong Kong to emerge from the "dark violence" of the 2019–2020 Hong Kong protests. National Security Committee Adviser Luo Huining also gave a speech. Even very young children were photographed handling toy weapons, which drew criticism.

Journalist Bao Choy was convicted of having made false statements in order to obtain public records about car licensing plates. Choy had requested these for a documentation about the 2019 Yuen Long attack which public broadcaster RTHK aired in 2020. The conviction was seen by journalist groups as a sign of shrinking press freedom in the city. Proclamations by police chief Chris Tang about the government intending to target "fake news" were considered by some to be an ill-defined notion and pointing in the same direction.

Seven veteran pro-democracy activists were sentenced for organizing and participating in a large unauthorized march on August 18, 2019. There were also a number of other convictions in relation to the protests of 2019.

As the government took steps to implement the 2021 Hong Kong electoral changes enacted by the National People's Congress, pro-establishment politicians floated the idea of making blank voting illegal, although this was considered either impractical or otherwise problematic by others.

== 1 April ==
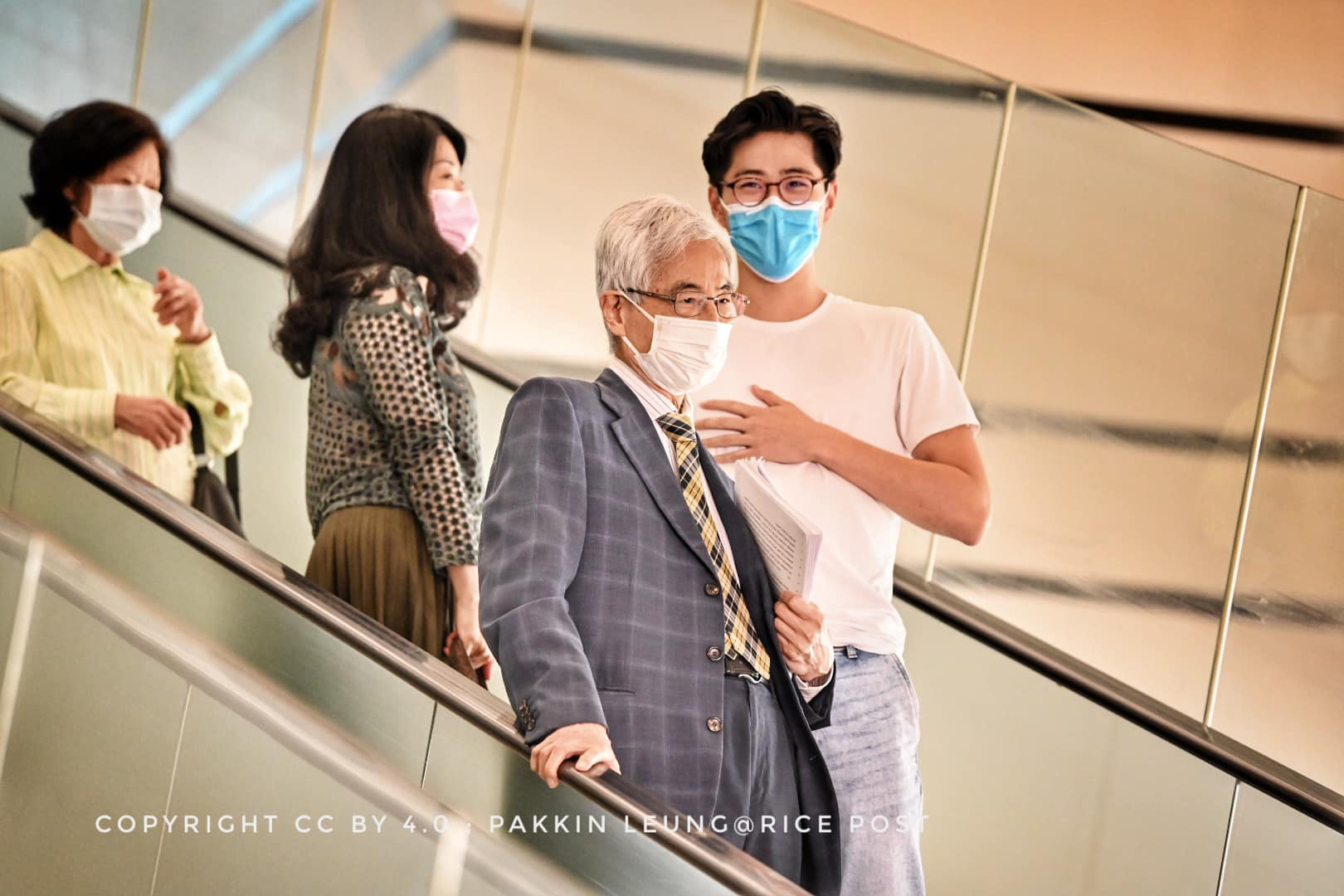
Martin Lee leaving the court after he was convicted

=== Pro-democracy figures convicted for 18 August rally ===
Jimmy Lai, Lee Cheuk-yan, Margaret Ng, Leung Kwok-hung, Cyd Ho, Albert Ho, and Martin Lee were found guilty of "organizing and participating in an unauthorized assembly", after being arrested for their participation in an unauthorized rally on 18 August 2019, which was also participated by some 1.7 million citizens.

==== Responses ====
At a White House press briefing, Press Secretary Jen Psaki said that the ruling once again showed that Beijing was eroding Hong Kong's freedoms and not fulfilling its international obligations under the Sino-British Joint Declaration.

U.S. State Department criticized the ruling. Spokesperson of UN Secretary-General Antonio Guterres said that people should have the right to gather peacefully.

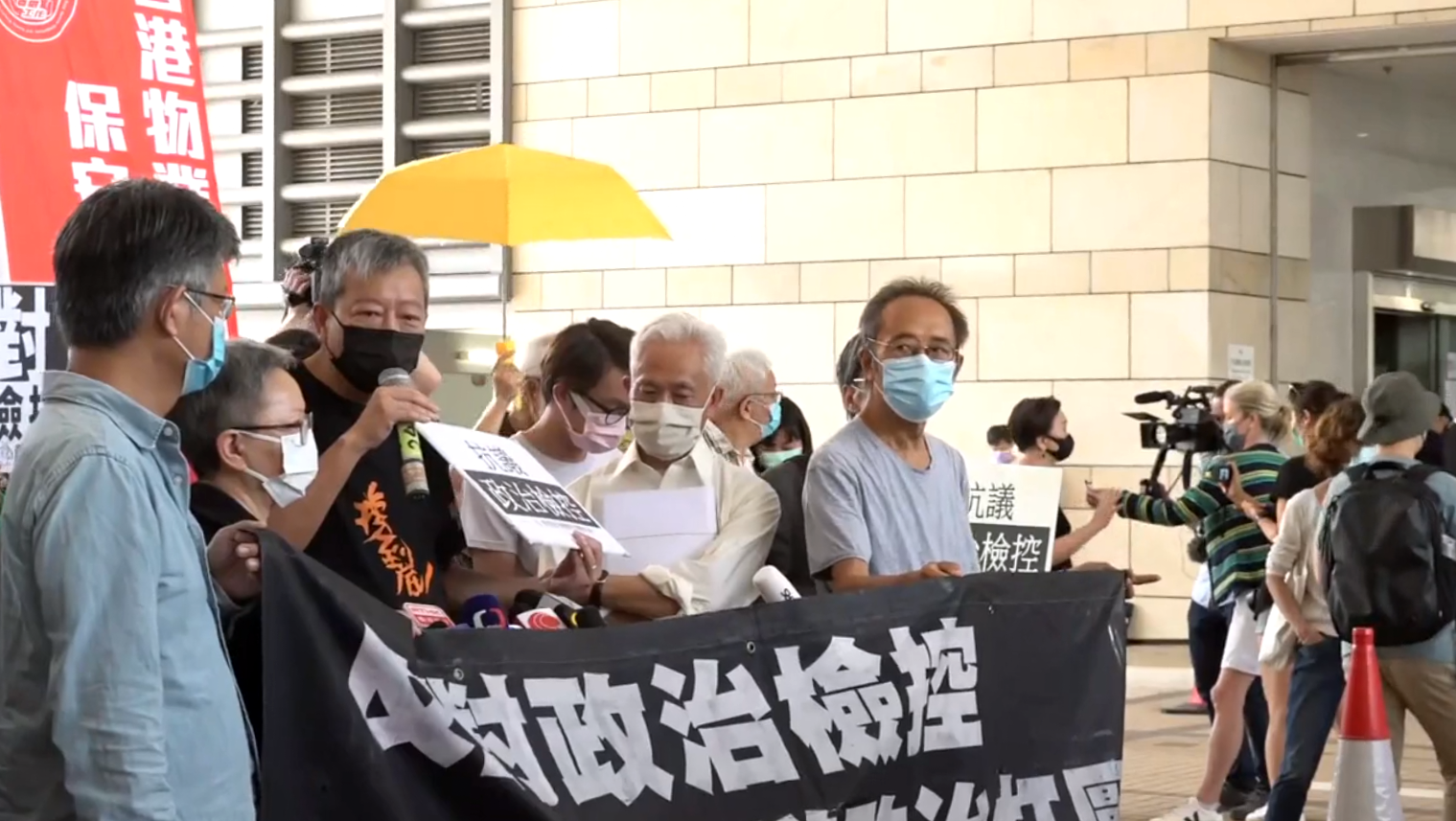
Pro-democracy groups support before entering the court

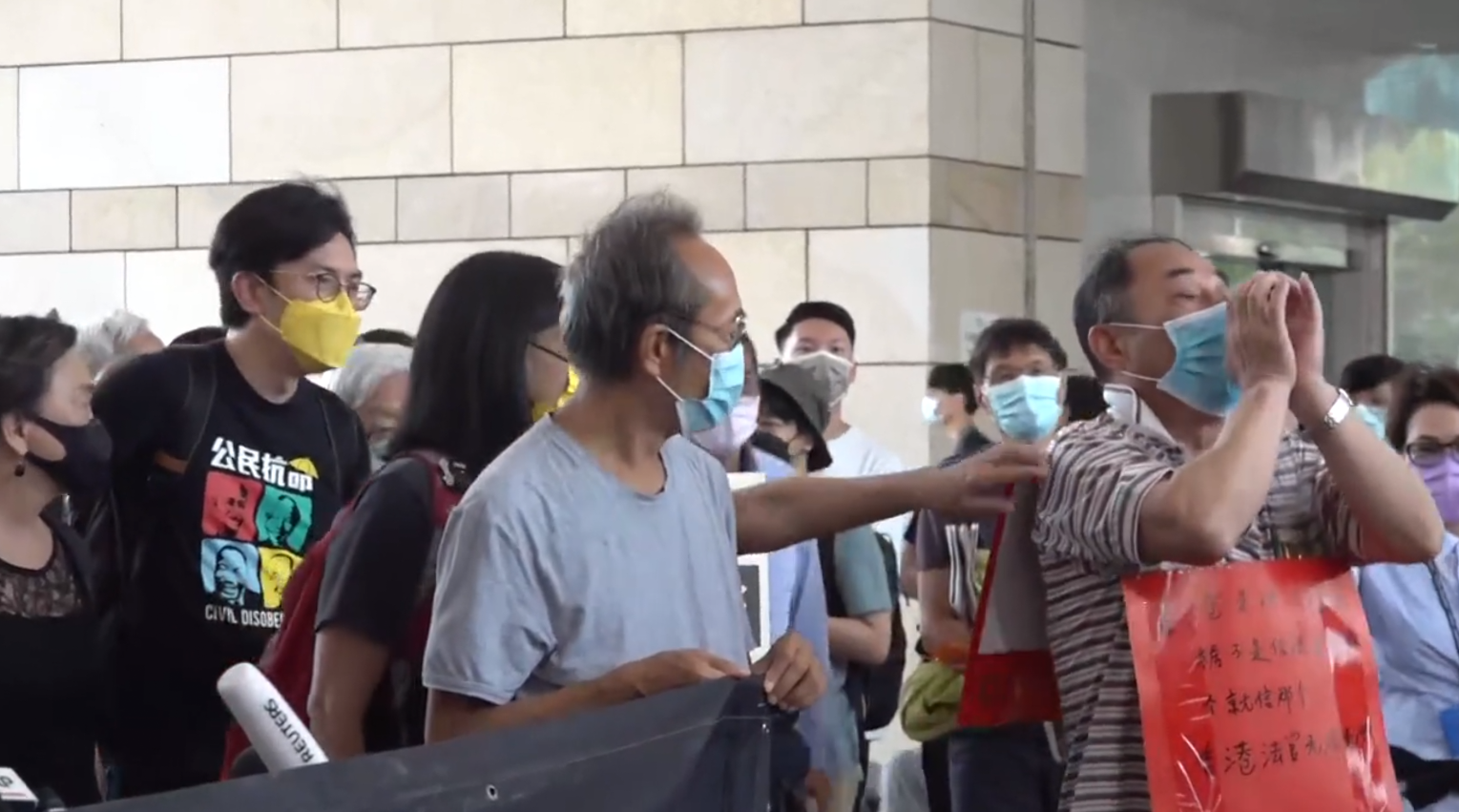
A pro-Beijing person rushed forward and shouted to pro-democracy figures

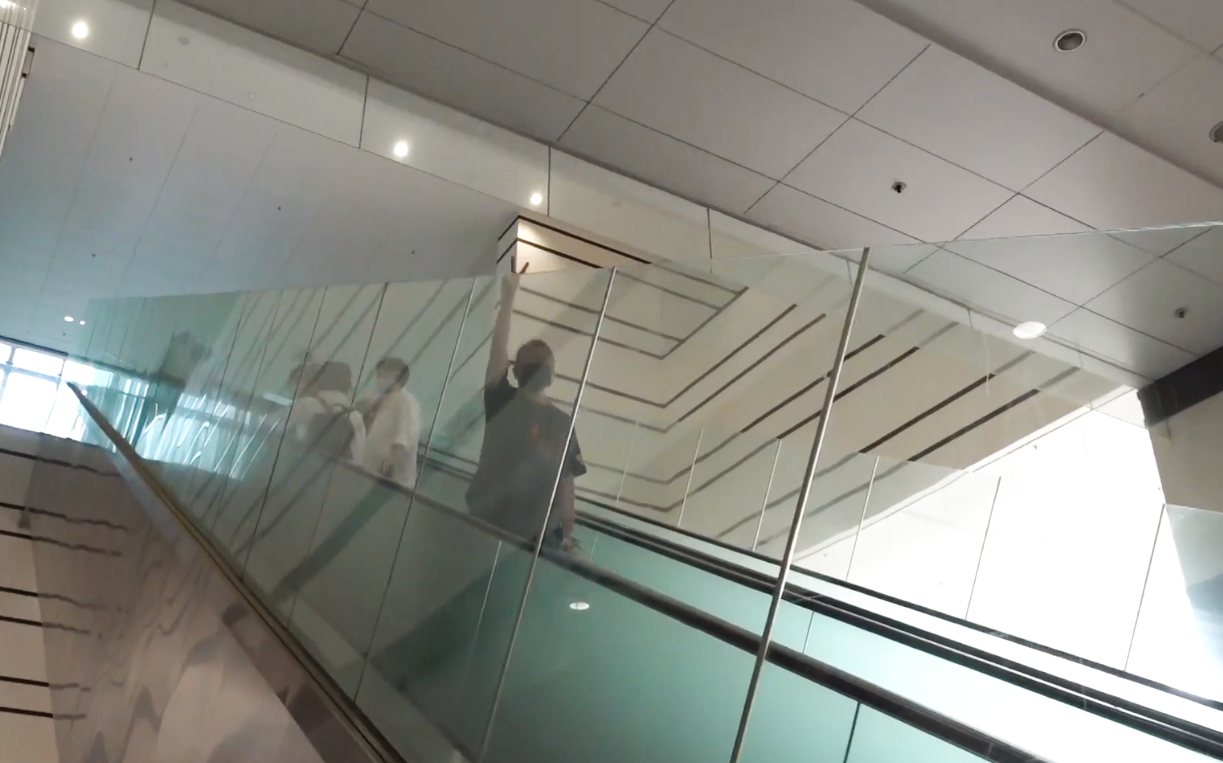
Lee Cheuk-yan took the escalator to the courtroom and raised a V sign to the reporters

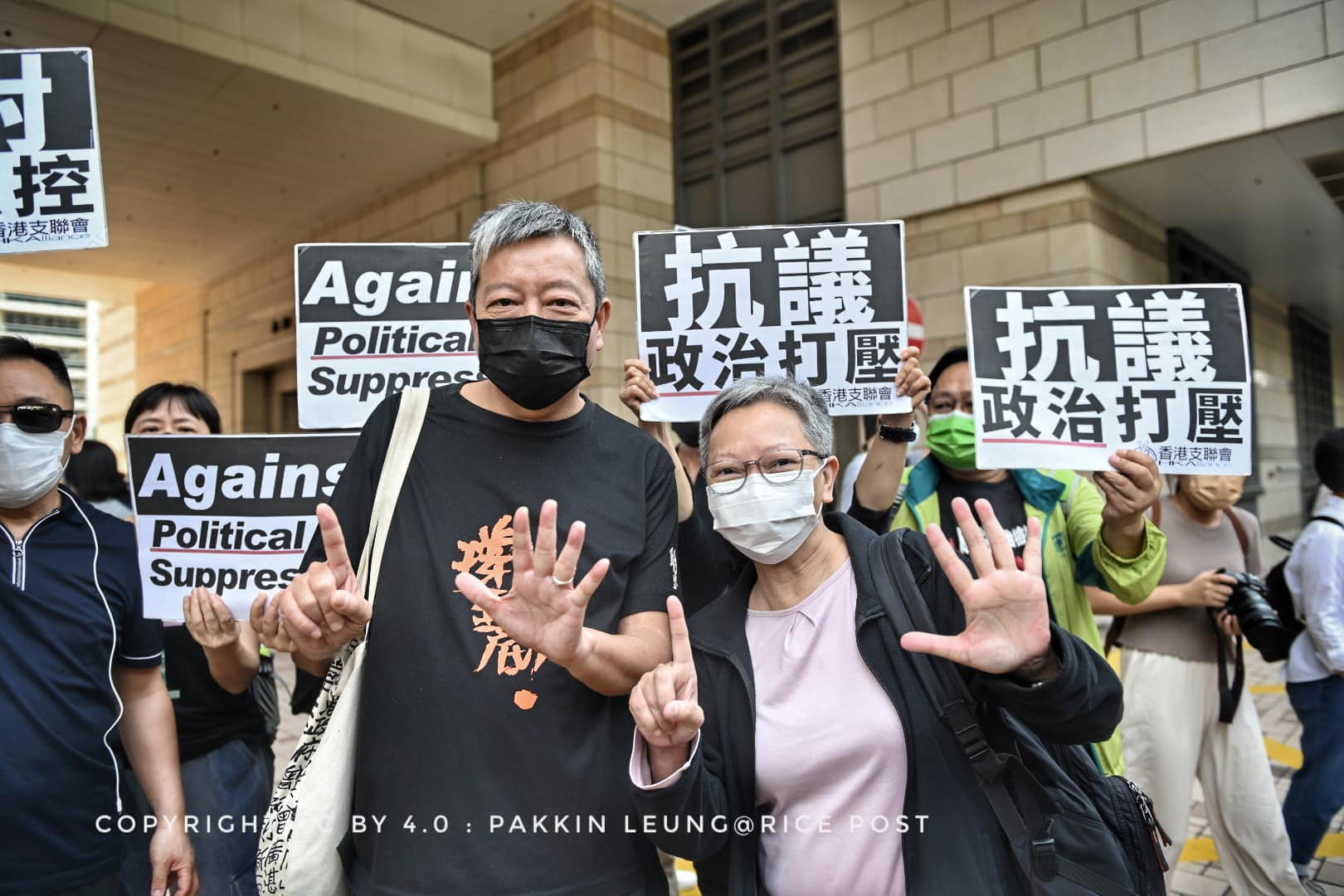
Lee Cheuk-yan and Cyd Ho raising the Five Demands hand gesture

=== Deputy Commissioner of police said Hongkongers should not test the red line of the National Security Law ===
Deputy Commissioner of Hong Kong Police Oscar Kwok was interviewed by Bloomberg. He did not respond positively to what specific behaviours violate the national security law. However, he said that Hongkongers should think about how to contribute to social harmony, peace and security, instead of 'trying the law' to test Hong Kong national security law's "red line".

== 3 April ==
=== Discussion over blank votes ===
During interviews with the press on 4 and 5 April, Secretary for Justice, Teresa Cheng, and Secretary for Constitutional and Mainland Affairs, Erick Tsang, floated the idea of banning blank ballots in the 2021 Hong Kong legislative election. The 2021 Hong Kong electoral changes had made blank voting appear as a possible form of protest. Legal scholar Johannes Chan from the University of Hong Kong pointed to legal difficulties in banning voters from casting blank ballots. Pro-establishment lawmaker Paul Tse said that such a ban would not be necessary in his view, but he warned that appeals for others to cast blank votes may violate the national security law. Democratic Party chairman Lo Kin-hei was evasive about the question whether his party would encourage blank voting, pointing to his party not having decided yet whether to run in the elections; if it were to run, it "would sound strange if we encouraged people to cast blank votes", he said.

=== Hongkongers emigrate to UK during Easter holiday ===
During the Easter holiday, Apple Daily inspected the Hong Kong International Airport and found that in the deserted departure hall, only the check-in counters for flights to the UK were crowded. Parents of Hong Kong residents who are preparing to immigrate to the UK stated that the political environment in Hong Kong was deteriorating. Under the circumstances of the national security law and the electoral reform, as well as the amendment proposed by the Security Bureau to amend the Immigration Ordinance, the Hong Kong government was to be granted the right to prevent Hong Kong people from leaving the country from 1 August. There were also international students who think that the pandemic situation in the UK had improved sufficiently for them to return to the local campus to attend classes.

=== Japanese telecommunications company KDDI considers moving data out of Hong Kong ===
Japanese media reported that KDDI (mobile phone service brand au) was considering transferring the relevant information from Hong Kong back to Japan for safekeeping, in response to China's implementation of the National Intelligence Law in 2017 and the Hong Kong national security law. At present, the company's server in Hong Kong stores data of mobile phone users in Japan, including phone numbers and communication usage.

== 5 April ==
=== 12 activists from the Mainland were handed over to Hong Kong after serving their sentences ===
Five of the Hong Kong activists who had completed their sentences in the Mainland and been handed over to Hong Kong appeared in Sha Tin Magistrates' Courts for their respective criminal cases after completing the quarantine. The five persons, Wong Wai-yin, Kok Tsz-lun, Cheung Chun-fu, Cheung Ming-yu and Yim Man-him, were taken to Sha Tin Magistrates' Courts by prison van. Wong was charged with manufacturing explosives in January last year, and the case was adjourned to be heard on the 3 May. Kok Tsz-lun was accused of rioting during protests in November 2019. His trial was adjourned to 5 May, awaiting referral to the District Court. Cheung Chun-fu, Cheung Ming-yu and Yim Man-him were accused of conspiring to illegally and maliciously harm police officers in December 2019; Cheung Chun-fu was also charged with possession of offensive weapons or tools suitable for illegal purposes. The five defendants did not apply for bail.

=== Patrick Nip: Improving Hong Kong electoral system must be interpreted with National Security Law ===
Secretary for the Civil Service, Patrick Nip, stated that the improvement of Hong Kong's electoral system must be interpreted together with the Hong Kong national security law. Nip said on social networking sites that last week, he held a related commentary meeting with director-level civil servants of the administrative director grade, emphasizing that civil servants are an important part of the administrative organ. Any changes to the social system require their concerted efforts to promote. He also quoted some civil servants at the meeting saying that visiting the mainland more often would definitely help to gain a deeper understanding of the country's development.

== 7 April ==
=== Andy Li appears at the court on collusion charges ===
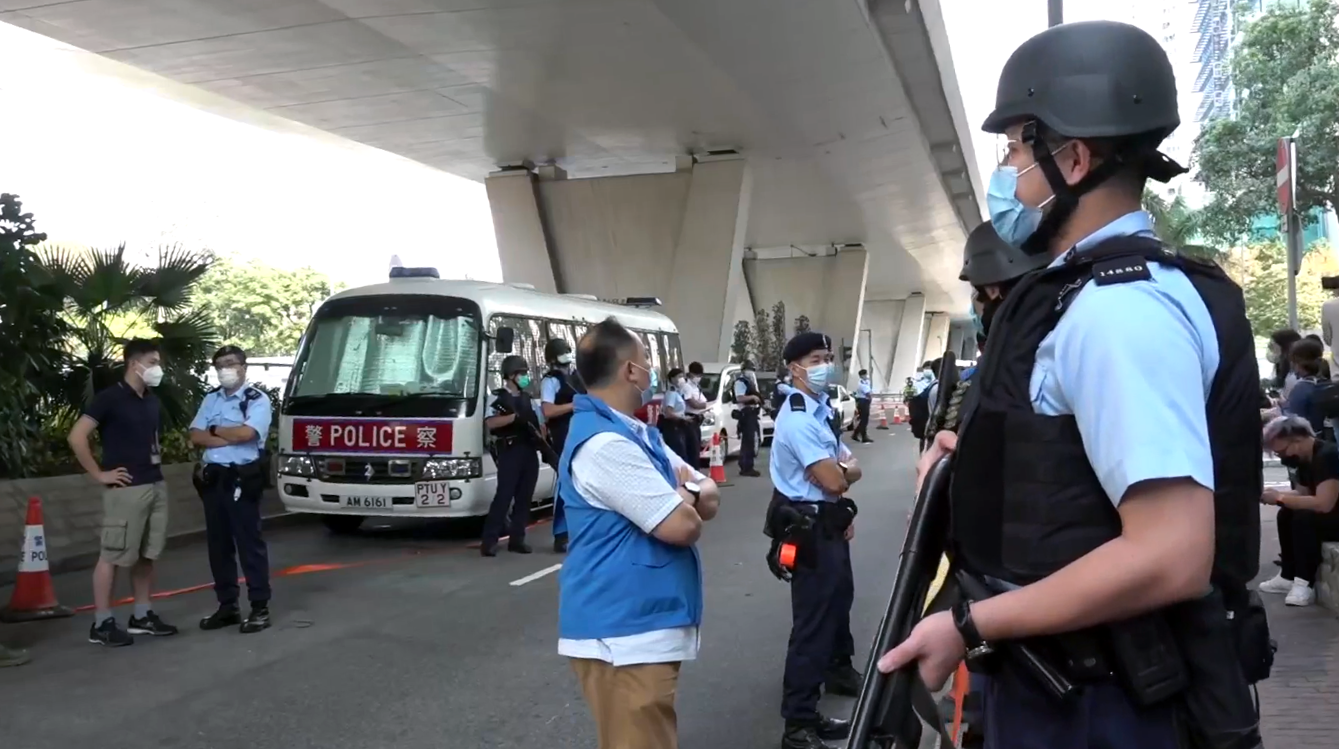
Police officers on standby outside the West Kowloon Magistrates' Court

One of the 12 Hong Kong activists, Andy Li, a member of the Hong Kong Story, appeared in court for the first time after completing quarantine. The case was conducted in West Kowloon Magistrates' Courts, to which Li was escorted by a large police motorbike fleet. Barrister Lawrence Law and solicitor Trevor Chan represented Li. Chan refused to tell reporters how Li had instructed him; he said he was "definitely not a government-appointed lawyer" and was unwilling to answer questions about why Li's family did not know him or Law. Law had been suspended twice in 2005 and 2007 owing to complaints about misconduct.

=== Pro-democracy figures plead guilty for unauthorized 31 August rally ===
Jimmy Lai, the founder of Next Digital, Lee Cheuk-yan, secretary-general of the Confederation of Trade Unions, and Yeung Sum, the former chairman of the Democratic Party, are accused of participating in an unauthorized rally, which was held on Hong Kong Island on 31 August 2019. They alleged that their parade was blocked for more than an hour. All three pleaded guilty. Lee said he had done "nothing wrong and history will absolve us". At the same time, he quoted political philosopher John Rawls's theory of fairness and John Stewart Mill's "On Freedom" and other works. He did not hesitate to test the law by himself or protest against the draconian law through peaceful civil disobedience, and was willing to accept legal and criminal responsibility. District Court judge Amanda Woodcock adjourned the case until 16 April after hearing the plea. Yeung and Lee were released on bail, during which Yeung had to surrender his travel documents, while Lai continued to be remanded due to the case.

=== Protester who was accidentally shot in melee sentenced to training center and given criminal record ===
On 4 October 2019, around 200 protesters occupied roads in Yuen Long to protest against the government's enactment of the Prohibition on Face Covering Regulation. A plainclothes officer approached the scene. As he exited the car, someone attempted to snatch his gun. He was surrounded by an angry crowd, reportedly as he was believed to have bumped into a person. A 14-year-old boy was shot by him in the left thigh in the ensuing chaos. The police officer was subsequently beaten by protesters and had a petrol bomb thrown at him, after which he escaped and called for help on his phone, and from arriving police vans after having been hit by another Molotov cocktail. Fanling Magistrates' Court Magistrate Don So said at the trial of the boy that he had been influenced by online calls as well as the sentiments of the crowd, and that he considered to have deserved being hit. Citing the seriousness of the incident, the magistrate sentenced the boy to a training center and ordered him to receive a criminal record.

=== Nathan Law granted political asylum in the UK ===
Former LegCo member Nathan Law posted on Facebook announcing that he had been granted political asylum in the UK. British Foreign Secretary Dominic Raab confirmed the news on Twitter on 8 April, stating that "the UK has a glorious history in providing protection to those in need." The Chinese Ministry of Foreign Affairs issued a warning on the next day that the United Kingdom had provided asylum for Law. The spokesman Zhao Lijian stated at a regular press conference that he "opposes any country, organization, or individual to shelter criminals in any way." He described the British side as a platform for Hong Kong independence elements and providing so-called asylum for wanted criminals. He described the act as a gross interference in Hong Kong's justice, contrary to international law and basic norms of international relations, and also against the rule of law principles that the British side had always advertised. He urged the British side should immediately correct its mistakes and stop interfering in Hong Kong affairs and China's internal affairs.

== 9 April ==
=== Prosecutors in Tong Ying-kit's case cited ancient examples ===
In the first case of the Hong Kong national security law, the defendant Tong Ying-kit was charged with inciting others to commit secession and terrorist activities. The prosecution invited Lau Chi-pang, a professor in the Department of History of Lingnan University, as an expert witness to write a report. He described the defendant driving a motorcycle with a Liberate Hong Kong flag, just like a soldier in ancient times putting on a battle flag and riding a horse on the battlefield. The High Court held a hearing to determine whether to accept the report as evidence. The judge questioned that Article 20 of the national security law clearly listed three types of secession behaviors, and believed that historical analysis was not helpful in interpreting legal provisions. In the end, only part of the testimony was approved, and the part of ancient history was rejected.

== 13 April ==
=== Activist jailed for unauthorized anti-mask ban rally ===
Eastern Magistrates' Court opened a trial to hear the case of Joshua Wong and Koo Sze-yiu participating in an unlawful assembly in Causeway Bay on 5 October 2019. The court convicted the two guilty, Wong was sentenced to 4 months in prison, and Koo was sentenced to 5 months in prison. In addition to the crime of unlawful assembly, Wong was also charged with 'using masked objects in an unauthorized assembly.'

== 14 April ==
=== Female barista convicted of arson and riot for four and a half years ===
On the night of 22 September 2019, more than 100 demonstrators were confronting officers at the Mong Kong Police station and lighting fires at the nearby junction of Nathan Road and Prince Edward Road West. Siu Lok-ting, a young female barista, was identified from news clippings as burning a plant and pieces of cardboard. District Court judge Frankie Yiu sentenced Siu to four and a half years in prison for taking part in a riot–making her the sixth person to be convicted of rioting in the 2019–2020 Hong Kong protests after trial–and two counts of arson, with the sentences to be served concurrently. She was cleared of a fourth charge of carrying an offensive weapon, as it could not be proved that a laser pointer that had been found on her had been carried for such a purpose.

=== Decoration worker sentenced to 3 months in prison ===
In the anti-national anthem law and national security law march on 24 May 2020, a 29-year-old decoration worker was accused of taking part in an unlawful assembly and holding high a banner printed with "Liberate" at the junction of Hennessy Road in Causeway Bay. He pleaded guilty to one count of unlawful assembly and was charged with the charge of displaying seditious publications. Chief Magistrate of the Eastern Magistrates' Court, Peter Law, pointed out that although the defendant was not the person leading the assembly, he also pointed out that the participants were also playing an important role. He described that "the assembly is mainly due to the great momentum, and the participants are emotionally high and do something that they usually don't dare to do." The defendant was sentenced to 3 months' imprisonment.

=== Paralegal is accused of violating national security case and reappointed DAB lawyer to represent him ===
A 29-year-old paralegal, Chan Tsz-wah, was accused of violating the Hong Kong national security law and assisting Andy Li, one of the 12 Hong Kong activists, to flee the country. The case was heard again in the West Kowloon Magistrates' Court. The reporter found that his barrister and lawyer representative were different from the last time he appeared in court. The barrister was changed to Victor Lau, a member of the Democratic Alliance for the Betterment of Hong Kong. Relatives and friends stated that the decision to hire a lawyer was the defendant's will.

== 15 April ==
=== National Security Education Day ===
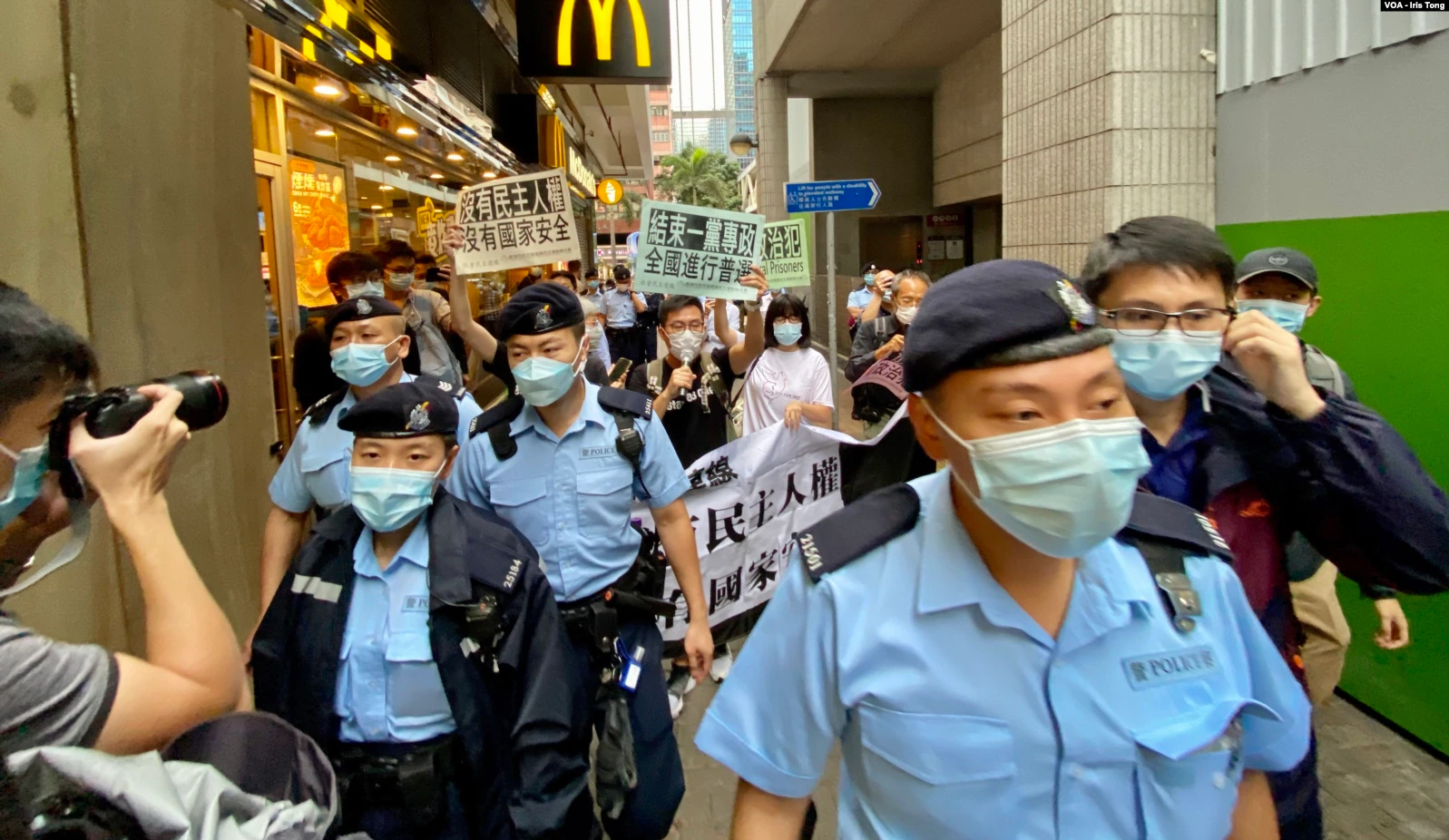
LSD members are protesting the National Security Education Day

Hong Kong government's Committee for Safeguarding National Security held the National Security Education Day. Chief Executive Carrie Lam said in a speech at the opening ceremony that this is the first national security education day after the implementation of the national security law and it is of great significance. She said that since mid-2019, Hong Kong had seen "dark violence" which had brought great security risks to the social and political system of the SAR. Only after the implementation of the law, Hong Kong stability and society was restored. She went on to say that in accordance with Article 9 of the law, necessary measures would be taken to strengthen publicity, guidance, supervision and management of schools, social organizations, media, and the Internet to deal with national security matters. Luo Huining, director of the Hong Kong Liaison Office and National Security Affairs Adviser of the Committee for Safeguarding National Security, emphasized that anything that undermines national security was "hard confrontation," and would be "counterattacked" in accordance with the law; if it was "soft confrontation," it would be regulated in accordance with laws and regulations.

Outside the venue, pro-democracy activists including League of Social Democrats member Raphael Wong, Figo Chan, and Hong Kong Alliance vice-chairwoman Chow Hang-tung held banners and shouted slogans. They marched from Wan Chai station to the Convention and Exhibition Centre, demanding that the government immediately abolish the national security law. A large number of Tactical Police officers surrounded them and asked the reporters to move forward. Chan criticized the police for setting up the demonstration area in Central Plaza to be very remote. At the same time, police officers blocked the parade's banners and surrounded them on a large scale.

=== Police College Open Day's first demonstration of Chinese marching, a reporter arrested ===
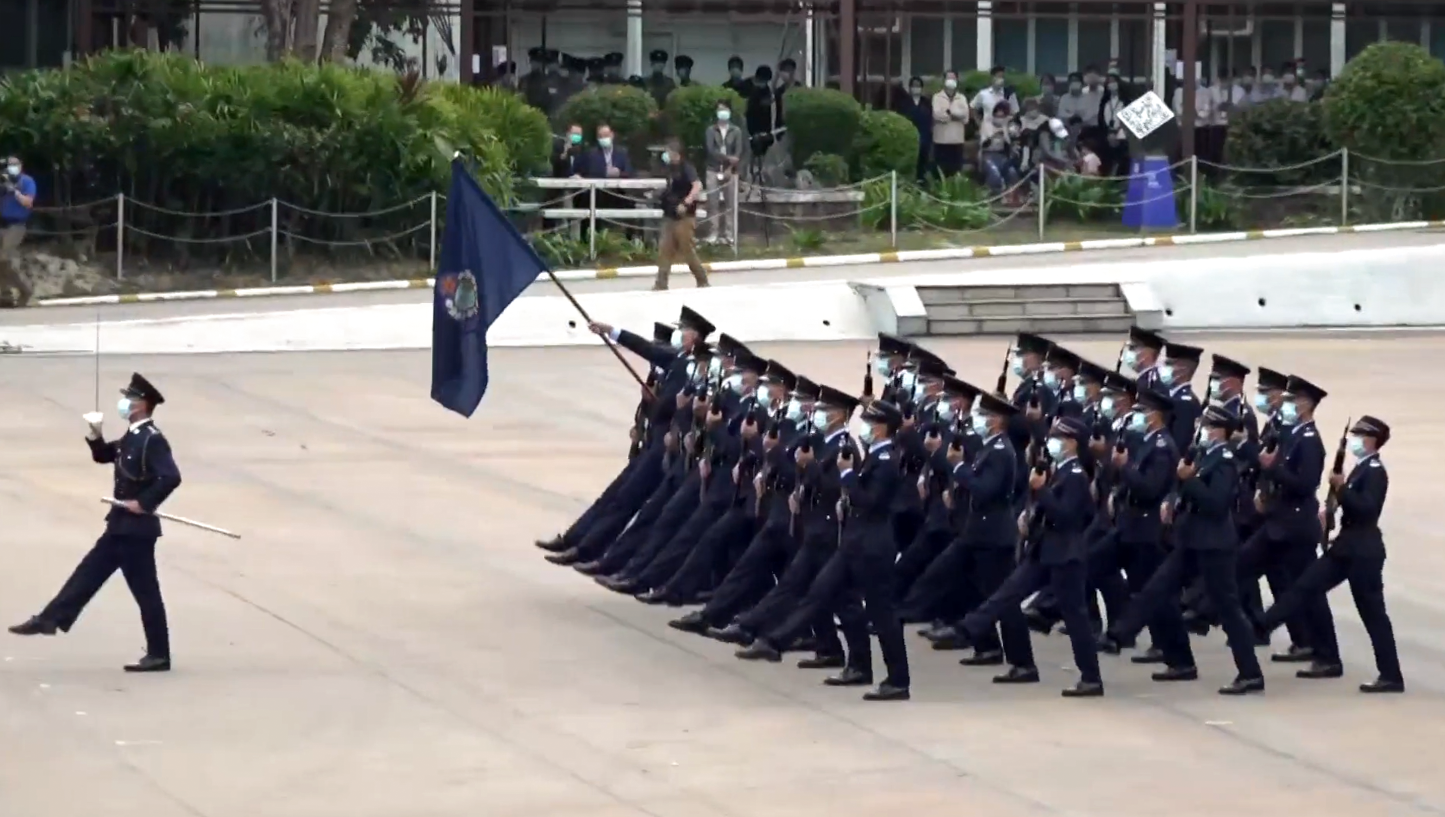
Hong Kong Police College Open Day demonstrates Chinese marching to the public for the first time

The training schools of the five major disciplined forces held open days. Among them, the Hong Kong Police College in Wong Chuk Hang was also open. For the first time, Chinese marching was performed publicly. The commander chanted the slogan 'Loyalty to protect the country and the courage to protect the family.' Many media were also invited to interview at the college, but they asked more than 30 reporters to take off the black and gray masks and replace the blue masks provided by the police.

The police strengthened their defenses in the police college. About 30 meters from the Ocean Park MTR station to the academy, there is a group of police officers, including plain-clothed and uniformed officers, and they are highly vigilant. When the reporter raised the camera and filmed, they stepped forward to enquire. The railway police officers intercepted and searched a 21-year-old man at Exit B of Ocean Park station at 8 am, and found two toy guns and a walkie-talkie in his rucksack. He was arrested for "suspicion of possession of imitation firearms" and was taken to Aberdeen Police Station for investigation. It is understood that the arrested person was a student of the Hong Kong Design Institute. He reported that he was a part-time reporter of RTHK and went to the Police College for an interview that day. The toy gun was used for his micro-movie earlier, but it was too late to clean up. RTHK stated that it confirmed the arrest of a part-time junior journalist and immediately relieved the part-time employee from his position.

=== A group of elementary school students aiming at their classmates with fake guns during National Security Education Day ===
Reuters photographed a group of elementary school students in the MTR carriages of the Tactical Training Building of the Hong Kong Police College, holding fake guns at their classmates. Related pictures shocked netizens in Hong Kong and Taiwan. Public opinion described it as a repeat of the attack on Prince Edward station on 31 August 2019, and questioned that "national security education" teaches children to 'point a gun at others.' United Daily Network of Taiwan described the child as learning from Hong Kong police uncles how to violently suppress Hong Kong people in subway stations, and compares the photos with the images of the Prince Edward Station attack.

== 16 April ==
=== Pro-democracy figures sentenced to prison ===
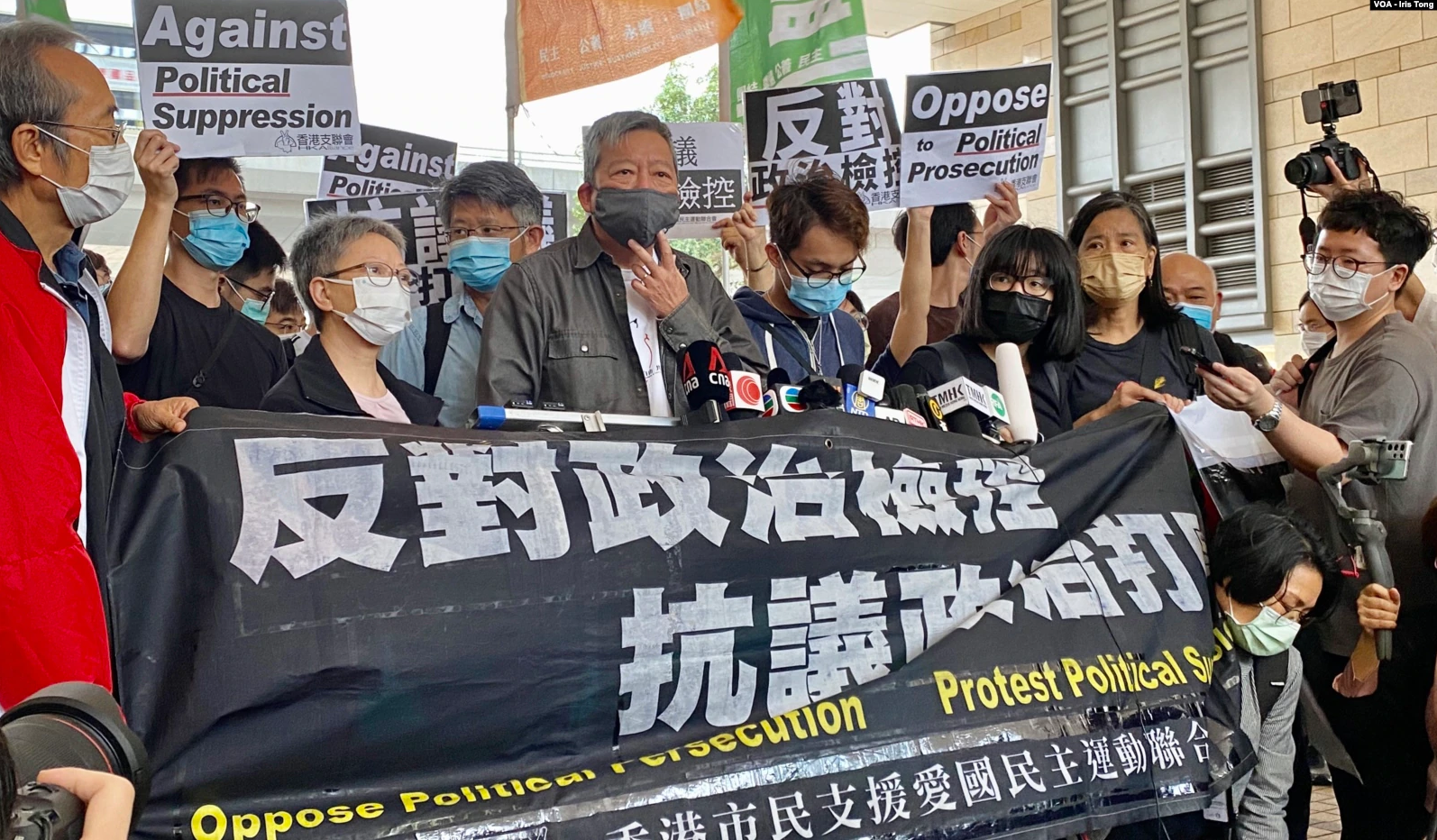
Pro democracy figures speaking to the reporters outside court before sentencing

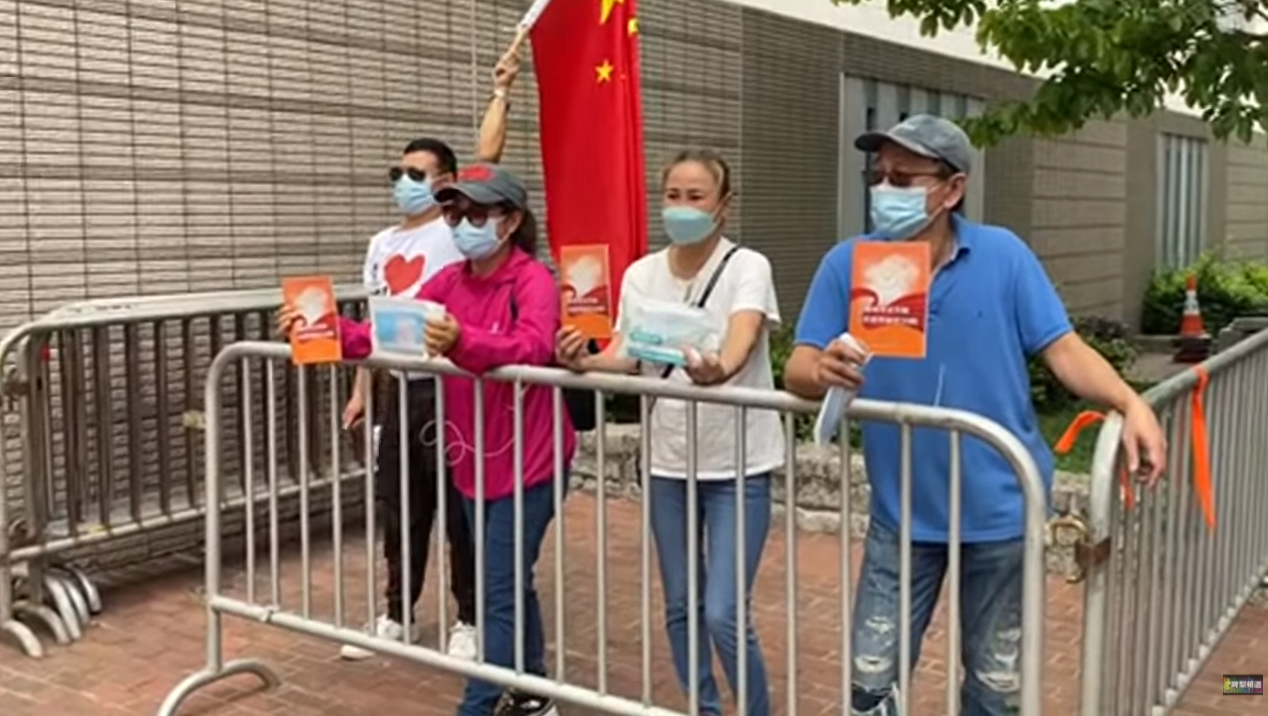
A group of pro-Beijing protesters outside the court

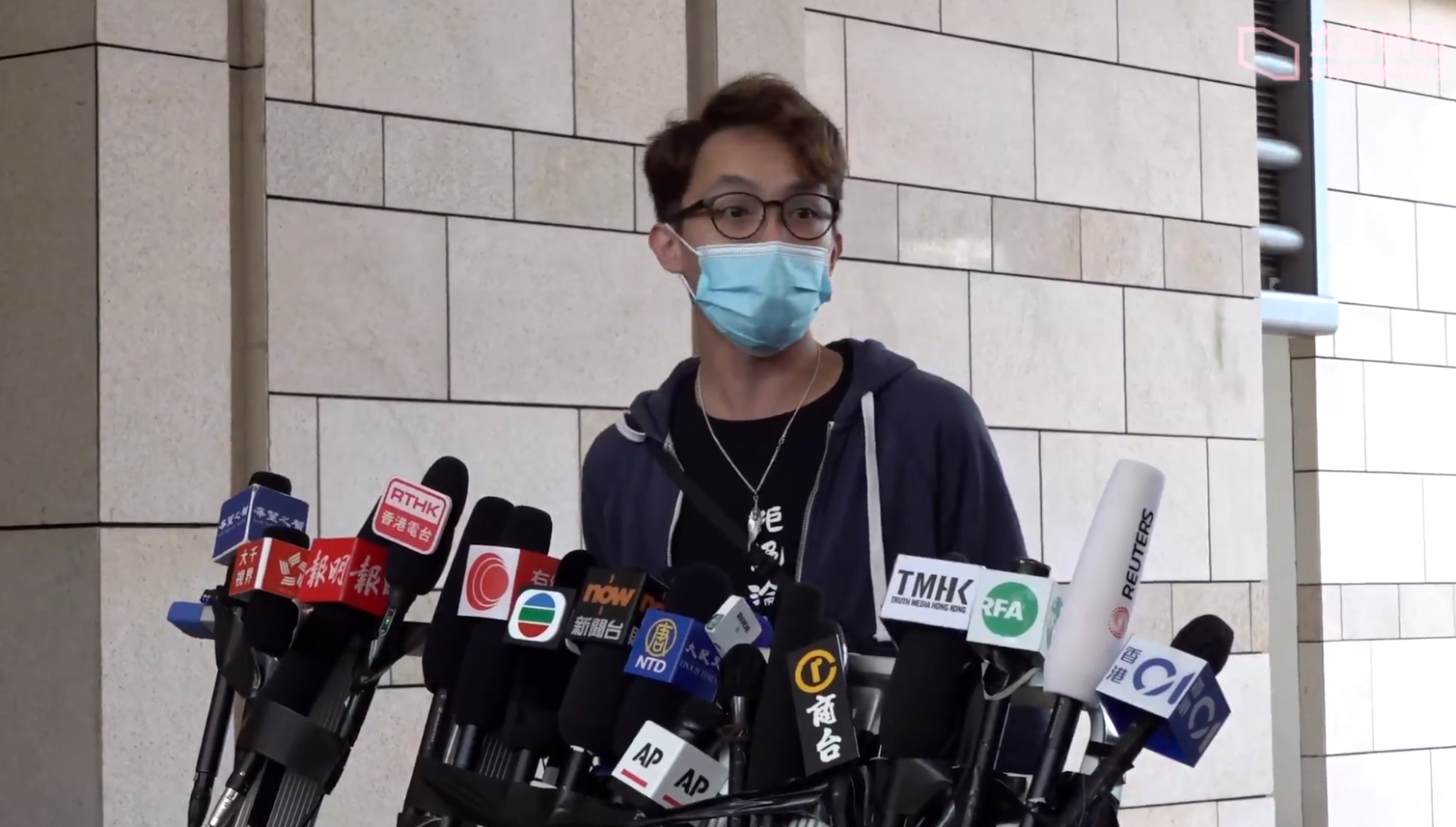
Figo Chan speaking to the reporters after sentencing of pro-democracy figures

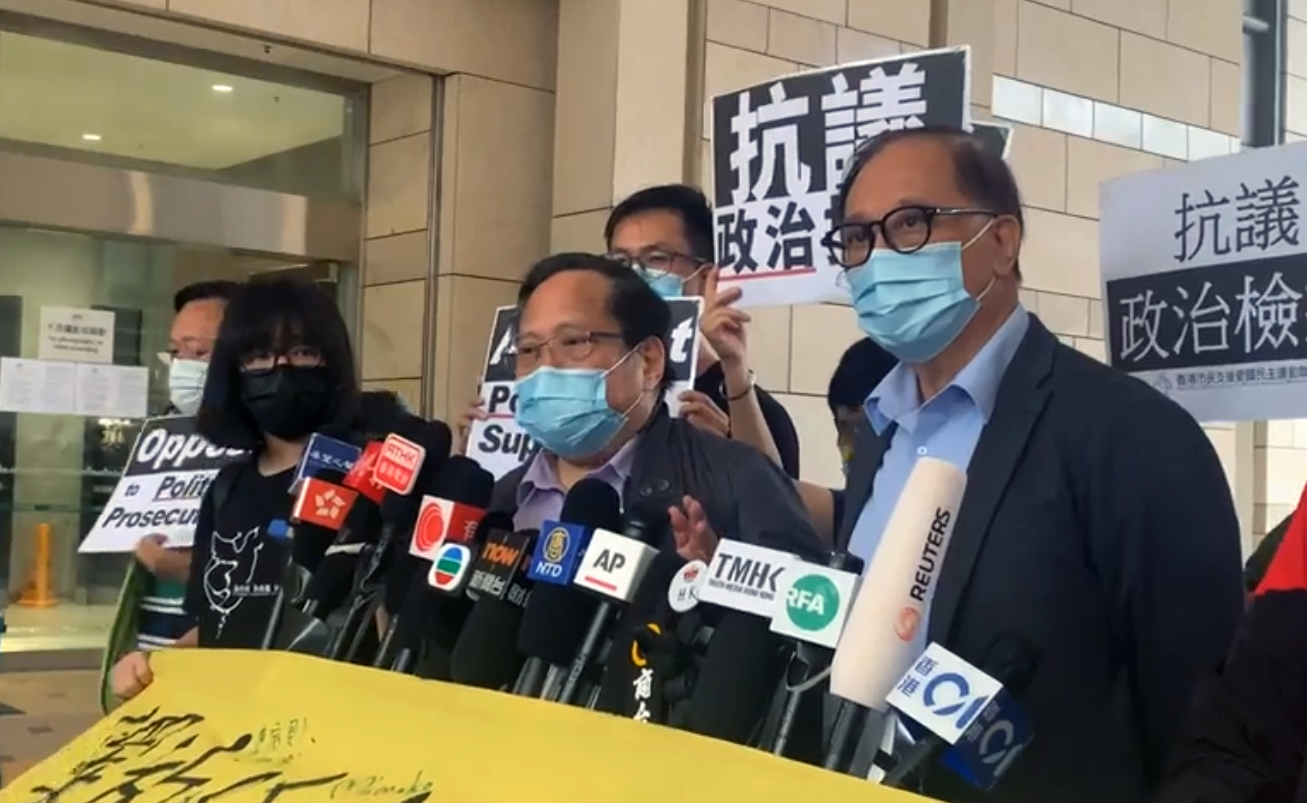
Albert Ho and Yeung Sum speaking to media after they get suspended sentences

Nine pro-democracy activists were charged with suspicion of organizing and participating in an unlawful assembly in a stream-style rally on 18 August 2019. The case was pleaded and sentenced in West Kowloon Magistrates' Court. Before the trial of the case, about 50 citizens lined up outside the court, waiting to enter the auditorium. Martin Lee, Albert Ho and Margaret Ng interceded in the morning. District Court judge Amanda Woodcock noted the influence of the nine defendants in society, which had enabled them to easily persuade the public to join that march, especially at such a volatile time. She said further that the march, while peaceful, could have turned violent and "posed a direct challenge to the police and therefore law and order". The following activists who convicted and sentenced to prison are:

- Leung Kwok-hung (sentenced to 18 months)
- Martin Lee (sentenced to 11 months, suspended for 24 months)
- Margaret Ng (sentenced to 12 months, suspended for 24 months)
- Albert Ho (sentenced to 12 months, suspended for 24 months)
- Lee Cheuk-yan (sentenced to 12 months)
- Jimmy Lai (sentenced to 12 months)
- Au Nok-hin (sentenced to 10 months)
- Cyd Ho (sentenced to 8 months)
- Leung Yiu-chung (sentenced to 8 months, suspended for 12 months)

Among them, Martin Lee, Jimmy Lai and Margaret Ng were convicted for the first time. The two counts were 'organizing an unlawful assembly' and 'knowingly taking part in an unlawful assembly'. Only Margaret Ng, Cyd Ho, Leung and Martin Lee were allowed to probate their sentences, and the remaining defendants must be imprisoned immediately.

Figo Chan, the convener of the Civil Human Rights Front, criticized the court for excessive sentences, which was absurd. He said that more than 1.7 million people took to the streets that day, but the police did not give them warnings or instructions, and did not take on the role of assisting the organizers to hold the rally. He criticized the regime for setting traps and making political prosecutions. The sentence will have a chilling effect, and the citizens will not dare to speak any more, and ultimately will only cause a backlog of people's grievances.

A number of British, American and Canadian lawmakers issued statements condemning the sentencing as a reflection of the Chinese government's authoritarian bullying. Last Hong Kong governor Chris Patten said in comments carried on the website of British civic society group Hong Kong Watch, that the sentences were part of a "comprehensive assault" by the CCP on Hong Kong's freedoms and the rule of law. U.S. Republican senator Mitt Romney and Amnesty International demanded the release of sentenced persons. British Foreign Office also issued a statement stating that it cannot accept the Hong Kong government's decision to prosecute major democrats, claiming that peaceful demonstrations are Hong Kong's way of life and rights. U.S. Secretary of State Antony Blinken issued a statement condemning the Hong Kong court cases of 18 August and 31 August rallies. The rally case sentenced Jimmy Lai and others to imprisonment. The ruling once again proves that the Chinese and Hong Kong authorities have violated the rights and fundamental freedoms guaranteed by the Basic Law and the Sino-British Joint Declaration, and eliminated dissidents in any form.

In the evening of the same day, the Public Prosecutors issued a statement in response, criticizing overseas politicians without naming their names and requesting the immediate release of sentenced persons. This is "absurd and blatant violation of the basic principles of international law and non-intervention." It made groundless attacks and totally disrespects the rule of law. It warns them that there is an opportunity to constitute contempt of court.

At the same time, Jimmy Lai, Lee Cheuk-yan, and former Democratic Party chairman Yeung Sum, who were charged with unlawful assembly in the conflict march on 31 August 2019. They all pleaded guilty and sentenced by District Court judge Amanda Woodcock at the West Kowloon Magistrates' Court. The following activists who convicted and sentenced to prison are:

- Jimmy Lai (sentenced to 8 months)
- Lee Cheuk-yan (sentenced to 6 months)
- Yeung Sum (sentenced to 8 months, suspended for 12 months)

Since Lai and Lee had been sentenced to 12 months in prison in the 18 August rally case, the two-month sentence was executed in installments, and the two were sentenced to a total of 14 months.

== 19 April ==
=== Hong Kong government spends HK$84 million to lobby the U.S. to oppose the Hong Kong Human Rights and Democracy Act ===
Online media Hong Kong Free Press exclusively reported that the Hong Kong Trade Development Council signed a service contract with local political lobbyist Bart Stupak. From the end of 2014 to September 2019, he met with American politicians in Washington several times and lobbied them not to support Hong Kong Human Rights and Democracy Act. The most recent "lobby action" was a few days before Joshua Wong and Denise Ho attended the U.S. Congressional hearing on 12 September 2019. Commissioner of Hong Kong Economic and Trade Office in the United States, Eddie Mak, met with Democratic representative Alan Lowenthal. The report also revealed that the TDC has hired as many as 26 lobbying companies, of which, from 2019 to the end of 2020, related expenses amounted to HK$12.32 million. Former Demosistō chairman Nathan Law pointed out that the Hong Kong Human Rights and Democracy Act was finally passed with only one vote against it, reflecting the total failure of the SAR government's lobbying and interference in American politics, which is "loyal waste." Kenneth Chan, associate professor of the Department of Politics and International Relations at Hong Kong Baptist University, believes that the Hong Kong government's actions are like piling money into the sea, because foreign governments know that the SAR government is the one who caused the incident.

=== People's Daily criticizes the Hong Kong University Students' Union ===
Chinese state media People's Daily published a comment, naming and criticizing the Hong Kong University Students' Union for smearing national security education, including the implementation of the national security law and the "improvement" of the electoral system. It was described as "continuously spreading reactionary ideas, trying to trick more students into boarding thief ships, tying colleges and universities to criminal chariots, and accumulating the black energy of 'continuing the revolution'. The accusation that the members of the Hong Kong University Students' Union are not students, but "hidden in Thugs in the campus." He even pointed out that the Students' Union was frantically testing the "edge of the bottom line," describing the time when the Student Union had to control it. The commentator also believes that Hong Kong education "goes astray" and must undergo "dramatic" reforms to establish a sound education system compatible with one country, two systems.

== 20 April ==
=== Telegram channel administrator jailed for 3 years for other people's remarks ===
In November 2019, the police arrested the 26-year-old female administrator of a channel of messaging software Telegram, Hui Pui-yee. Hui pleaded guilty to conspiracy to incite others to commit arson, and conspiracy to commit an act with seditious intent. District Court judge Frankie Yiu pointed out that the defendant, as a channel manager, had the right to modify or delete information related to the case, but had allowed relevant information to exist and circulate. The seriousness of this case is that the information published on the Internet can quickly incite others in a short period of time. In particular, there are 39 arson messages, referring to teaching the making of gasoline bombs, thermite bombs, and arson bombs. The judge took into account the role of the defendant and the lack of evidence showing that she had actively released information. In view of the defendant's plea and personal circumstances, the sentence was three years in prison, reduced from the starting point of four.

=== Hong Kong ranks 80th in Press Freedom Index ===
Reporters Without Borders released the 2021 Global Press Freedom Index, in which Hong Kong ranked 80th, and like last year, China ranked 177th. The report pointed out that the chilling effect of the Hong Kong national security law became more and more obvious, and that the government arbitrarily punished acts that it considered to "endanger national security", thereby threatening the freedom of the press and journalists in Hong Kong. The report specifically mentioned that the authorities arrested the founder of Next Digital, Jimmy Lai, for fear of facing life imprisonment with the national security law. RTHK was also facing a full-scale threat from the government.

== 21 April ==
=== Hong Kong Connection producer fined ===
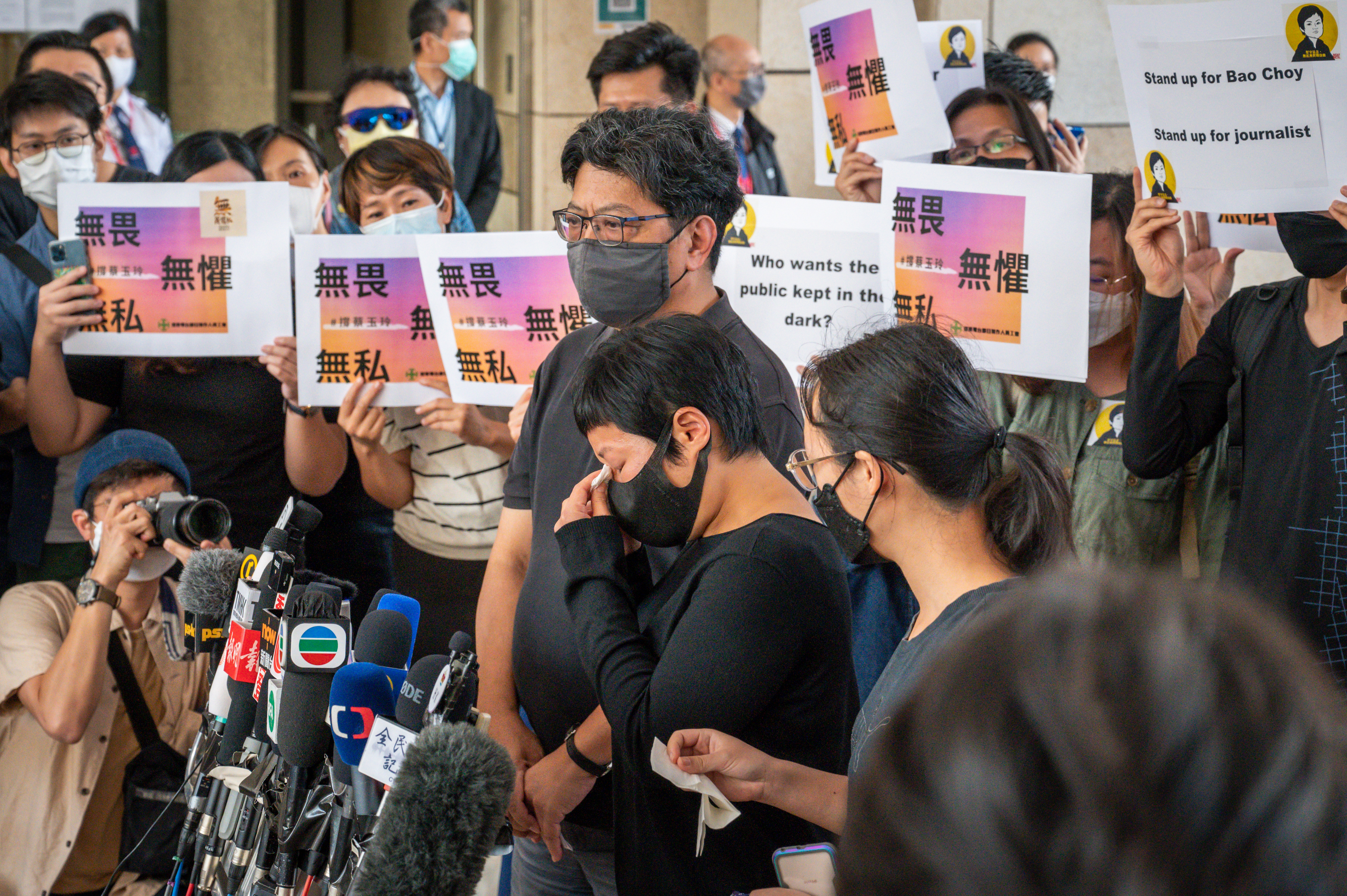
Bao Choy shed tears when speaking to the reporters after she was fined

Bao Choy, the freelance producer of RTHK Hong Kong Connection episode '7.21: Who Owns the Truth' aired in 2020, was charged with two counts of "knowingly making false statements on essential matters" for checking license plates. Principal Magistrate Ivy Chui stated that the Commissioner of Transport had the right to restrict the application to "traffic and transportation" related purposes, to ensure that the information would not be misused by the public. The defendant should consider using other methods to obtain information, such as submitting a written application to the Department of Transport instead of making a false statement. Choy was convicted of two counts of "knowingly making false statements on essential items" and was fined HK$3,000 for each crime, totaling HK$6,000. The case is also the first person to be convicted and sentenced in the Yuen Long 721 incident. It is also the first time a journalist has been convicted due to a search.

After hearing the sentence, a tearful Choy expressed disapproval of the sentence and described the result as sad and uncomfortable. Eight news outlets and organizations issued a joint statement stating that normal interview work being declared illegal sounded the death knell for press freedom.

== 24 April ==
=== Former National Front member sentenced to 12 years in jail over possession of TATP ===
Louis Lo, who was a member of the pro-independence fringe group Hong Kong National Front which disbanded in June 2020, had pleaded guilty to the possession of about 1 kilogram of explosive TATP, 10 petrol bombs and TATP raw materials in a Tsuen Wan industrial building in July 2019. High Court judge Andrew Chan described Lo as the "mastermind" behind the explosives lab. He compared the crime of Lo to that of the late Yip Kai Foon. While he said that the court did not know the intended use of the explosives, a very heavy sentence was a duty to the public in view of the danger to which it had been subjected, saying that the action of Lo "came close to declaring war [on] the society". As the starting point for sentencing, 18 years of imprisonment was adopted, with the guilty plea leading to a reduction to 12 years. The case set a record for length of the sentence in protest-related charges.

=== Office for Safeguarding National Security to be set up in Tai Kok Tsui ===
The government announced the approval of a two-part piece of Hoi Fan Road in Tai Kok Tsui, covering an area of approximately 11,500 square meters, to the Hong Kong Office for Safeguarding National Security for its permanent establishment, which was to comprise office and ancillary facilities. However, the news did not explain the land price and the lease period. It was not announced until the next day that the land would be granted free for 50 years until 2071. Part of the approved land is currently a marine police operation base, and the police indicated that they would move out in due course. Yu Tak-po, vice chairman of the Yau Tsim Mong District Council and Civic Party member, said that the government had not consulted the district council beforehand, and it was unknown whether it would be forbidden to discuss it in the district council because of 'national security.'

=== Ernie Chow revealed that he has left Hong Kong ===
Ernie Chow, the former president of the Chinese University of Hong Kong Student Union, revealed in a Facebook post that he had left Hong Kong for Canada on 25 March. Chow said that he had been asked to talk to an individual about the Alternative Citizens’ Deliberative Platform disbanded in December 2020. The meeting was to be held during the March hearing of the case of 47 people arrested in January for their involvement in the July 2020 democratic primaries. Chow went on to say that he did not go to the meeting as he feared he would have had to divulge the names of others in order to save himself. Also, the arrest of the 47 had sounded an alarm bell for him. He asked for forgiveness for his "cowardice", and that he was not confident that he could “keep his dignity and not surrender nor beg” if he was in court.

== 26 April ==
=== Annual Tiananmen vigil banned for the first time under National Security Law ===
This year is the first Tiananmen vigil after Hong Kong national security law came into effect. Hong Kong Alliance in Support of Patriotic Democratic Movements of China plans to continue to hold candlelight gatherings this year. According to the news, the police considered the pandemic and the gathering restriction order is still in effect. It is expected that the police will not approve the gathering activities as last year. Hong Kong Alliance secretary-general Richard Tsoi did not comment on the relevant news, saying that he would request a no-objection notice as originally planned. He believed that the police should respect the right to processions and demonstrations. If the police have any consideration, they should first discuss with the organizer a feasible plan. In response to enquiries, the Leisure and Cultural Services Department stated that it had received an application from the Alliance to use Victoria Park to hold an assembly event on 4 June. Inform the stake of the arrangement.

=== Teresa Cheng: Freedom of speech and assembly is not absolute ===
Secretary for Justice, Teresa Cheng published an entry in her official blog, in which she stated that although the Basic Law and the Hong Kong Bill of Rights protect citizens' basic rights of freedom of speech, peaceful assembly, procession and demonstrations, their rights are not absolute, but can be restricted. She pointed out that in the past, demonstrators had illegally occupied government premises. It was necessary to take control measures for approved public gatherings and demonstrations held on government premises. She pointed out that public activities in the front of the East Wing of the Central Government Complex required permission in advance, to ensure that "the normal and effective operation and public safety including the safety of the other users of the premises" were not compromised.

=== 21 people arrested in PolyU siege after kicking bail ===
Detectives of the Organized Crime and Triad Investigation Branch of the Hong Kong Police re-arrested 21 men and women who were between 17 and 41 years old in the morning, who were involved in major conflicts and refused bail pending investigation. They were suspected of having been in the Ho Man Tin area on 18 November 2019, with the intention of assisting people in the Polytechnic University to evade police arrest and were charged with one crime of obstruction of justice. It is understood that some of the arrested persons are drivers of "parent cars", and there are also fresh graduates of the Diploma of Secondary Education Examination who were unable to take the General Studies Paper 1 due to detention.

=== Woman sentenced to 9 months in prison for possession of offensive weapons on National Day ===
A woman demonstrating on 2019 National Day protest was charged with possession of offensive weapons such as screwdrivers and possession of items with intent to damage property. She was convicted of two counts and sentenced to nine months in prison and was remanded in custody awaiting appeal.

== 28 April ==
=== Sports instructor sentenced to 21 months in jail ===
On 3 November 2019, a 23-year-old swimming and fitness instructor was seen throwing a bag into the Shing Mun River at Lek Yuen Bridge, Sha Tin, and attacked officers who had approached him. After he was subdued, six petrol bombs and drill bits were found in his bag. He was charged with assaulting a police officer and possessing offensive weapons in a public place. The defendant denied the charge. Magistrate Veronica Heung said the case was serious. Considering that the incident was at the peak of violent demonstrations and the background report showed that the defendant had no regrets, he was sentenced to 21 months in prison.

== 30 April ==
=== Four people plead guilty in the unauthorized Tiananmen vigil ===
Joshua Wong, Lester Shum, Tiffany Yuen, and Jannelle Leung each pleaded guilty to holding the Victoria Park June 4th candlelight vigil in violation of the Public Order Ordinance of "knowingly taking part in an unlawful assembly" in the District Court. The four were taken into custody to await sentencing the following week. Among them, Leung was remanded in prison for the first time because of a plea. Eddie Chu, who originally decided to plead guilty, applied for the withdrawal of the plea decision through a legal representative.

=== Two more teachers were deregistered for life ===
The Education Bureau stated that two more teachers had been deregistered since the anti-extradition bill protests. One was convicted after having been convicted of a crime in relation to the protests, and the other for after being accused of "using a large amount of one-sided and biased teaching materials". Separately, the bureau released new details of about 20 other cases that had already concluded with punishment, including at least two cases where teachers were remanded or reprimanded for playing or having allowed to play musics with "strong political messages" on campus. It said that teachers were obliged to "correct students' thinking and acts", adding they "should not simply follow students’ choices".

=== Female defendant sentenced to 3 years and 2 months in prison for possession of petrol bomb in Wan Chai ===
District Court judge Eddie Yip was handling a case in which five men and one woman stood accused of possession with intent to destroy or damage property. In November 2019, petrol bombs and other flammable materials had been found in a flat in Wan Chai. The woman pleaded guilty and was sentenced to three years and two months in prison. The following month, a further member of the group received the same sentence, with Yip saying that crimes involving petrol bombs were always severe.

=== 9 people charged in 12 Hong Kong activists case ===
Of the ten people who returned to Hong Kong in the 12 Hong Kong activists case, nine appeared at the Eastern Law Courts. They were accused of intending to pervert the course of justice, together with several people under aliases, through several acts between December 2019 and August 23, 2021, including their unsuccessful attempt at fleeing with three others by boat to Taiwan in August 2020. The case was adjourned to be heard again on 18 June, and all the defendants continued to be remanded.

=== Three men charged for illegal assembly on 9 August 2019 ===
Three men were arrested for participating in a demonstration in Wong Tai Sin on 9 August 2019, and were charged with the crime of unlawful assembly; one of them was also charged with possession of 2 laser pointers and the crime of possession of offensive weapons in a public place. At the Kwun Tong Magistrates' Court on the 30 April, the three defendants do not need to respond temporarily, pending the defense's request for documents and legal opinions. The case was adjourned to be heard again on 10 June. Principal Magistrate Bina Chainrai approved three people to be released on bail at HK$1,000 each. During this period, they were not allowed to leave Hong Kong and were subject to a curfew. In addition, they had to report to the police station every week.
