= Carlye Chu =

Hong Kong judge

The Honourable Madam Justice Carlye Chu Fun-ling VP
- 朱芬齡

Vice President of the Court of Appeal of the High Court
- Incumbent
- Assumed office 2022

Justice of Appeal of the Court of Appeal of the High Court
- In office 2011–2022

Judge of the Court of First Instance of the High Court
- In office 2000–2011

Registrar of the High Court
- In office 1999–2000

Deputy Registrar of the High Court
- In office 1997–1999

District Judge
- In office 1995–1997

Magistrate
- In office 1991–1995

Personal details
- Born: 1960 (age 65–66) Hong Kong
- Education: London School of Economics (LLM); University of Hong Kong (LLB, MSocSc)

Carlye Chu Fun-ling
- Traditional Chinese: 朱芬齡
- Simplified Chinese: 朱芬龄
Transcriptions
Standard Mandarin
- Hanyu Pinyin: Zhū Fēnlíng
Yue: Cantonese
- Jyutping: zyu1 fan1 ling4

Carlye Chu Fun-ling (Chinese: 朱芬齡; born 1960) is a Hong Kong judge. She has served as a Vice President of the Court of Appeal of the High Court since November 2022.

== Education and legal career ==
Chu graduated from the University of Hong Kong with an LLB in 1982 and a PCLL in 1983. She was called to the Hong Kong Bar in 1983. She received her LLM from the London School of Economics in 1985. She was a barrister in private practice from 1985 until 1991.

Chu obtained a Master of Social Sciences in Criminology from the University of Hong Kong in 1994.

== Judicial career ==
In 1991, Chu joined the bench as a Permanent Magistrate. In 1995, she became a District Judge.

She was appointed as Deputy Registrar of the High Court in 1997, as Registrar of the High Court in 1999, and as Judge of Court of First Instance of the High Court in 2000.

In 2011, Chu was elevated to the Court of Appeal.

Chu acted as Returning Officer for the 2005 and 2017 Hong Kong Chief Executive elections.

Chu is a member of the Judicial Officers Recommendation Commission.

In October 2022, Chu was part of a team of 3 judges who ruled against Jimmy Lai and said that "despite its importance to the freedom of the press, the protection afforded to journalistic material is not absolute."

In November 2022, Chu was appointed as Vice President of the Court of Appeal.
