= Recorders of the Court of First Instance of the High Court =

Recorder of the Court of First Instance of the High Court
- 高等法院原訟法庭特委法官
- Style: The Honourable
- Type: Part-time judge
- Member of: Court of First Instance
- Nominator: Judicial Officers Recommendation Commission
- Appointer: Chief Executive
- Constituting instrument: Section 6A, High Court Ordinance
- Formation: 1994
- Salary: $11,765 HKD per day (2020)

Recorders of the Court of First Instance of the High Court (Chinese: 高等法院原訟法庭特委法官), commonly referred to as a High Court Recorder, is a position for experienced practitioners (so far, only Senior Counsel have been appointed) who are willing to sit as a High Court Judge for a few weeks every year, but are not prepared to commit themselves to a permanent, full-time appointment. It was intended to act as a more formal system of appointment compared to the more ad hoc nature of appointment of Deputy High Court Judges (Chinese: 高等法院原訟法庭暫委法官); this position is broadly the same as a Recorder in England and Wales.

The position was created in 1994 through an amendment to the Supreme Court Ordinance (now the High Court Ordinance). Recorders have the same jurisdiction, powers and privileges as a High Court judge, and the eligibility requirements for becoming a recorder are identical to those required of High Court judges.

Recorders are appointed on a 3-year term basis. Since the establishment of the position in 1995, there have been 50 Recorders; of those, 13 (or 26%) eventually became full-time judges. There are currently 13 serving Recorders.

== List of recorders ==
Recorders are listed by date of appointment; seniority (when Recorders are appointed on the same day) is sorted by firstly the year of becoming Silk, secondly by year of being called to the Hong Kong Bar, and lastly by alphabetical order.

1. Robert Tang QC SC (1995–2004); later appointed as full-time judge
2. Edward Chan QC SC (1995–2007)
3. Ronny Wong QC SC (1995–2007)
4. Robert Kotewall SC (1997–2000)
5. Jacqueline Leong SC (1997–2006)
6. Roberto Ribeiro SC (1997–1999); later appointed as full-time judge
7. Kenneth Kwok SC (1997–2006)
8. Lawrence Lok SC (1997–2006)
9. Wong Ching-yue SC (1997–2006)
10. Andrew Liao SC (2000–2002)
11. Gladys Li SC (2000–2003)
12. Geoffrey Ma SC (2000–2001); later appointed as full-time judge
13. Michael Lunn SC (2000–2003); later appointed as full-time judge
14. Benjamin Yu SC (2003–2012)
15. Joseph Fok SC (2003–2009); later appointed as full-time judge
16. Patrick Fung SC (2006–2015)
17. Gerard McCoy SC (2006–2009)
18. Andrew Macrae SC (2006–2010); later appointed as full-time judge
19. Ambrose Ho SC (2006–2012)
20. Jat Sew-tong SC (2006–2015)
21. Anthony Chan SC (2006–2012); later appointed as full-time judge
22. Paul Shieh SC (2006–2015)
23. Rimsky Yuen SC (2006–2012); later appointed Secretary for Justice
24. Anderson Chow SC (2010–2014); later appointed as full-time judge
25. Horace Wong SC (2010–2013)
26. Jason Pow SC (2013–2022)
27. Lisa Wong SC (2013–2017); later appointed as full-time judge
28. Russell Coleman SC (2013–2019); later appointed as full-time judge
29. Anthony Houghton SC (2013–2022)
30. Robert Whitehead SC (2015–2018)
31. Teresa Cheng SC (2015–2018); later appointed Secretary for Justice
32. Winnie Tam SC (2015–2023)
33. Stewart Wong SC (2015–2023)
34. Linda Chan SC (2015–2019); later appointed as full-time judge
35. Eugene Fung SC (2018–2025); later appointed as full-time judge
36. Charles Manzoni SC (2018–2024)
37. Yvonne Cheng SC (2018–2022); later appointed as full-time judge
38. Martin Hui SC (2021– )
39. Eva Sit SC (2021– )
40. Rachel Lam SC (2021– )
41. William Wong SC (2021– )
42. Victor Dawes SC (2021– )
43. Richard Khaw SC (2021– )
44. José-Antonio Maurellet SC (2021– )
45. Abraham Chan SC (2021– )
46. Jin Pao SC (2021– )
47. Maggie Wong SC (2022– )
48. Derek Chan SC (2022– )
49. Jenkin Suen SC (2024– )
50. Eric Kwok SC (2025– )
