= Woo Kwok-hing =

Politician and former judge from Hong Kong (born 1946)

Woo Kwok-hing GBS CBE QC
- 胡國興
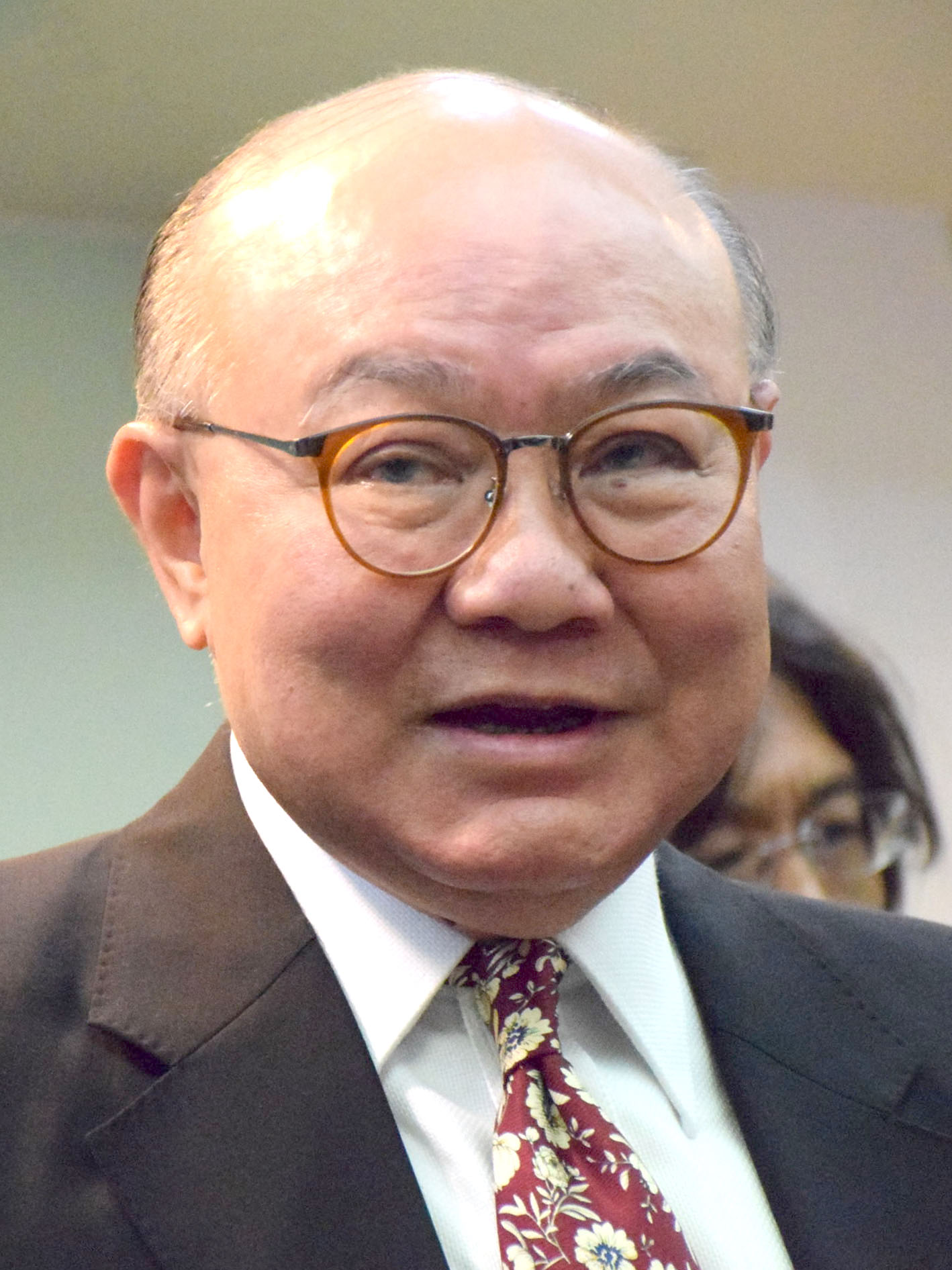
- Woo in October 2016

Vice-President of the Court of Appeal of the High Court
- In office 1 January 2004 – January 2011
- Preceded by: Simon Mayo (vacant from 2002)
- Succeeded by: Wally Yeung

Chairman of the Electoral Affairs Commission
- In office 23 July 1993 – 17 August 2006
- Preceded by: Position established
- Succeeded by: Pang Kin-kee

Personal details
- Born: 13 January 1946 (age 80) Yau Ma Tei, Kowloon, Hong Kong
- Spouse: Rowena Tang Siu-ting
- Children: 4
- Education: Ying Wa College; University of Birmingham; University College London
- Profession: Judge

Woo Kwok-hing
- Traditional Chinese: 胡國興
- Simplified Chinese: 胡国兴
Transcriptions
Standard Mandarin
- Hanyu Pinyin: Hú Guóxīng
Yue: Cantonese
- Yale Romanization: Wùh Gwok hīng
- Jyutping: Wu^{4} Gwok^{3} hing^{1}

Woo Kwok-hing, GBS, CBE, QC (Chinese: 胡國興; born 13 January 1946) is a Hong Kong retired judge. He was the vice-president of the Court of Appeal of the High Court and former chairman of the Electoral Affairs Commission (EAC) and commissioner on Interception of Communications and Surveillance. Between 1969 and 1992 he was a Queen's Counsel barrister in private practice and served concurrently as the head of the Law and Business department in Shue Yan University. In the 2017 Chief Executive election, he received 21 votes in the 1,194-member Election Committee and lost to the eventual winner Carrie Lam.

== Education and legal career ==
Woo was born in Shanghai Street, Yau Ma Tei, Kowloon in 1946 into a construction business family. He was educated at the Ying Wa College and graduated from the University of Birmingham with a bachelor's degree of laws in 1968 and University College London with a master's degree of laws in 1969. He said he wanted to be a lawyer after watching the film Witness for the Prosecution starring Charles Laughton.

He was called to the English Bar in 1969 and the Hong Kong Bar in 1970. He served pupillage with Ronald Arculli. He was appointed Queen's Counsel in 1987. He was in private practice from 1970 to 1992.

He became the head of the Department of Law & Business of Hong Kong Shue Yan College in 1986. He was appointed Judge of the Court of First Instance of the High Court in 1992 and Justice of Appeal of the Court of Appeal of the High Court in 2000. He was a Justice of Appeal of the Court of Appeal of the High Court and was appointed vice-president of the Court of Appeal of the High Court in 2004. He officially retired from the judiciary in January 2011 but continued to serve as deputy judge until 2016.

== Public career ==
Between 1993 and 2006, he was the chairman of Electoral Affairs Commission (EAC) which is responsible for running and supervising elections in Hong Kong shortly after Chris Patten became Hong Kong's last Governor and established the electoral organ. He handled the first three Chief Executive elections, which were won by Tung Chee-hwa and Donald Tsang, in which he had to face public scrutiny and also interpret election rules. He was criticised for allowing Tung to do his electioneering while still in office as Chief Executive in 2002.

As a senior judge, he led a number of historic public independent inquiries, including the inquiry into the Garley Building inferno in 1996 and the chaotic opening of the new airport in 1998.

In August 2006, Woo took up the post of Commissioner on Interception of Communications and Surveillance soon after retiring as the EAC chairman, in which he served until 2012.

In March 2007, he was appointed by Chief Executive Donald Tsang as the head of the commission to investigate allegations over meddling with the academic freedom and autonomy of educational institutions involving the proposed merger of the Hong Kong Institute of Education and the Chinese University of Hong Kong. He resigned after less than a week to avoid potential accusations of lack of impartiality due to his working relationship with Fanny Law, former Permanent Secretary for Education and Manpower.

== 2017 Chief Executive campaign ==
Woo became the first candidate to declare his campaign on 27 October 2016. He launched an offensive campaign against incumbent Chief Executive Leung Chun-ying, questioning his achievements during his term, while Woo himself was questioned for his lack of experience in public administration.

On 14 December, Woo Kwok-hing unveiled his electoral platform under the slogan of "Righteous heart, righteous way, revert Hong Kong back to right track". He proposed to expand the voter base for choosing the Election Committee to one million in the 2022 Chief Executive election from the current 250,000, rising to three million by 2032 and eventually quasi-universal suffrage. His attendees included Andy Ho On-tat, former information coordinator during the Donald Tsang administration from 2006 to 2012.

He later updated his platform adding the proposal of legislating Hong Kong Basic Law Article 22 which prohibiting mainland Chinese authorities for "meddling" in Hong Kong affairs as Beijing's Liaison Office in Hong Kong had been accused of meddling with the city's elections.

Woo made an emergency plea for support after getting just three nominations on the first day of the nomination period. As the "Democrats 300+" planned to nominate John Tsang and Woo Kwok-hing to boost the competitiveness of the election against Beijing's favoured candidate Carrie Lam, Woo gradually received nominations from pro-democrat electors. Six electors from the Higher Education subsector including Civic Party founding chairman Kuan Hsin-chi became the first pro-democrats decided to nominate Woo on 15 February. 46 pro-democrat members from seven Election Committee also decided to nominate Woo on 18 February. After Tsang received enough nominations, pro-democrats turned to help Woo. On 27 February, Woo became the second candidate to be nominated, with 180 nominations in which almost all of them came from the pro-democracy camp.

Woo received only 21 votes in the 1,194-member Election Committee in the final election, becoming the lowest votes a Chief Executive candidate ever had, as his pro-democrat nominators switched side to John Tsang in order to boost Tsang's chance of winning.

== Personal life ==
Woo is the fourth child of the family. He has a sister named Teresa Wu Chiu-ha who is a kindergarten headmaster and a brother Woo Kwok-yin who is a lawyer. He is married to Rowena Tang Siu-ting, sister of Robert Tang, permanent judge of the Court of Final Appeal. The couple has two sons and two daughters. His eldest son Alexander Woo married Yu Man-ying, daughter of entrepreneur Yu Ching-po, while his youngest son, Alan Woo, is also a lawyer.

In March 2021, Apple Daily reported that his sister, Woo Chiu Ha, was suspected of building illegal structures measuring 2500 square feet at her village house, built with government subsidies under the small house policy. In July 2021, it was reported that Woo Chiu Ha was accused by former and current staff of abuse of power, child abuse, and changing meeting records. On 30 July 2021, the allegations were confirmed by the Education Bureau.

In March 2022, his son, Alan Woo, was arrested on suspicion of assaulting his girlfriend. Alan denied the charges and claimed his girlfriend was drunk and fell, causing the injuries to her body.

Government offices
New title	Chairman of Electoral Affairs Commission; 1993–2006	Succeeded by Pang Kin-kee
New title	Commissioner on Interception of Communications and Surveillance; 2006–2012	Succeeded by D. G. Saw
Legal offices
Preceded by Vacant; Title last held by Simon Mayo	Vice-President of Court of Appeal of High Court; 2004–2011	Succeeded by Wally Yeung
Order of precedence
Preceded by Tam Sheung-wai; Recipient of the Gold Bauhinia Star	Hong Kong order of precedence Recipient of the Gold Bauhinia Star	Succeeded by S. W. Harbinson; Recipient of the Gold Bauhinia Star
