= Barnabas Fung =

Hong Kong judge (born 1960)

The Honourable Mr Justice Barnabas Fung Wah GBS
- 馮驊
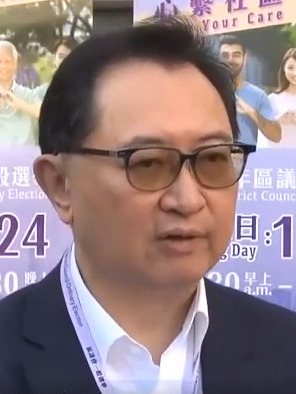
- Fung in 2019

Chairman of the Electoral Affairs Commission
- In office 17 August 2009 – 16 August 2022
- Preceded by: Pang Kin-kee
- Succeeded by: David Lok

Judge of the Court of First Instance of the High Court
- Incumbent
- Assumed office 2006

Chief District Judge
- In office 2001–2006
- Preceded by: Richard Hawkes
- Succeeded by: Patrick Li

District Judge
- In office 1998–2001

Permanent Magistrate
- In office 1993–1998

Personal details
- Born: 1960 (age 65–66) Hong Kong
- Education: University of New South Wales; University of Hong Kong

Barnabas Fung
- Traditional Chinese: 馮驊
- Simplified Chinese: 冯骅
Transcriptions
Standard Mandarin
- Hanyu Pinyin: Féng Huá
Yue: Cantonese
- Jyutping: fung4 waa4

Barnabas Fung Wah, GBS (Chinese: 馮驊; born 1960) is a Hong Kong judge. He has served as a High Court Judge since 2006.

Since 2016, Fung has served as a Panel Judge handling interception and surveillance authorisation requests from law enforcement agencies.

He was Chairman of the Electoral Affairs Commission from 2009 to 2022.

He previously served as Chairman and Director of the Hong Kong Children's Choir.

== Education and legal career ==
Fung was educated at Wah Yan College, Hong Kong and Barker College, Australia. He graduated from the University of New South Wales with a BComm and LLB in 1984 and 1985 respectively. He obtained his PCLL from the University of Hong Kong in 1986.

Fung was called to the New South Wales Bar and Hong Kong Bar in 1985 and 1986 respectively. He was a barrister in private practice in Hong Kong from 1987 to 1993.

== Judicial career ==
In 1993, Fung joined the bench as a Permanent Magistrate. He became a District Judge in 1998 and was subsequently appointed as Chief District Judge in 2001.

Fung sat as a Deputy High Court Judge intermittently from December 2001 to July 2006.

In November 2006, Fung was appointed as a Judge of the Court of First Instance of the High Court. He was the Judge in charge of the Personal Injury List from 2008 to 2010.

Fung acted as Returning Officer for the 2007 Hong Kong Chief Executive election.

In 2009, Fung was appointed as Chairman of the Electoral Affairs Commission. He was re-appointed in 2013 and 2017 (for a term of 5 years until 2022). On 16 August 2022, it was announced that Fung's chairmanship of the EAC expired that day and the Government was actively identifying his successor, whose appointment would be announced in due course.

Fung has sat in the Court of Appeal in a number of civil and criminal appeal cases.

== Awards ==
- 2017 Gold Bauhinia Star (in recognition of his distinguished service as the Chairman of the Electoral Affairs Commission)
