= Andrew Macrae (judge) =

South African judge (born 1956)

The Honourable Mr Justice Andrew Colin Macrae VP

Vice President of the Court of Appeal of Hong Kong
- Incumbent
- Assumed office 23 April 2018

Justice of Appeal of the Court of Appeal of Hong Kong
- Incumbent
- Assumed office 21 October 2013

Judge of the Court of First Instance of the High Court of Hong Kong
- In office 12 April 2010 – 21 October 2013

Recorder of the Court of First Instance of the High Court of Hong Kong
- In office 2006–2010

Personal details
- Born: 1956 (age 69–70) United Kingdom
- Education: Durham University (BA, St John's College)

Andrew Colin Macrae (Chinese: 麥機智; born 1956) is Vice President of the Court of Appeal of Hong Kong.

== Early life and legal career ==
Macrae was born in Northern Rhodesia and attended Durham University, where he was a member of St. John's College.

In 1979, Macrae was called to the Bar in England and was admitted to Middle Temple. He was elected as a Bencher at Middle Temple in 2021.

Macrae was called to the Bar in Hong Kong in 1983. He was in private practice as a member of the Chambers of Gary Plowman SC.

He took silk in 1999.

== Judicial career ==
Macrae sat as a Deputy High Court Judge for periods in 2002 and 2003.

Macrae was appointed as a Recorder of the Court of First Instance of the High Court of Hong Kong from 2006 to 2010. He was appointed as a full-time Judge of the Court of First Instance of the High Court of Hong Kong on 12 April 2010.

He was elevated to the Court of Appeal of Hong Kong in 2013 and became Vice President of the Court of Appeal in 2018.

=== Notable cases ===
In 2011, Macrae presided over the re-trial of Nancy Kissel for the murder of her husband, Robert Peter Kissel.

In 2013, Macrae presided over the criminal trial of Peter Chan in relation to the forgery of a will purporting to be the will of Nina Wang, who at the time of her death was chair of Chinachem Group and Asia's richest woman.

In 2014, Macrae sat as an additional Judge of the Court of First Instance and presided over the criminal trial of the former Chief Secretary for Administration, Rafael Hui, and property magnate Thomas Kwok.

In 2017, Macrae (sitting with Mr Justice Lunn, VP and Mr Justice Zervos in the Court of Appeal) heard the application of Rurik Jutting for leave to appeal against his conviction for the murders of Sumarti Ningsih and Jesse Lorena.

In 2018, Macrae (sitting with Mr Justice Yeung, VP and Mr Justice Pang, JA in the Court of Appeal) heard the application of former Chief Executive Donald Tsang for leave to appeal against his conviction for misconduct in public office.
