= Pang Kin-kee =

Hong Kong judge

- 彭鍵基

Chairman of Electoral Affairs Commission
- In office 2006–2009

Judge of the Court of First Instance of the High Court
- In office 1997-?

Personal details
- Born: 1947 (age 77–78); China
- Education: Queen's University

Mr Justice Pang Kin-kee, SBS (彭鍵基; born 1947) is a former Judge of the Court of First Instance of the High Court in Hong Kong.

== Biography ==
Pang was born in China in 1947. He was educated at the Diocesan Boys' School in Hong Kong followed by Queen's University in Canada, where he graduated with a Bachelor of Arts (BA) in 1970. He was called to the English Bar in 1978 and had a career in private practice between 1979 and 1985. He was admitted as barrister and solicitor in Australia in 1983. In 1985, he was appointed magistrate and became a district judge in 1987. In 1997, he became a judge of the Court of First Instance of the High Court.

Pang served as member of the Judicial Officers Recommendation Commission from 27 January 2000 to 30 June 2001, in place of the Hon. Mr Justice Gerald Paul Nazareth upon his retirement; he was also the Returning Officer of the Chief Executive election of 2002. Pang was named as Electoral Affairs Commission chairman for three years from 17 August 2006; following the enactment of the Interception of Communications and Surveillance Ordinance, Pang was named one of the panel judges to consider applications.

== Judgment controversy ==
In December 2008, Pang came under criticism from Chief Justice Andrew Li for having handed down three different judgments for one case. It appeared that Pang had forgotten what he had ruled in the first place.

== Leung Chin-man affair ==
Serving as Chairman of the Advisory Committee on Post-service Employment of Civil Servants when the application of old school friend Leung Chin-man was considered, Pang declared his interest and did not partake in the vote. Leung's application was eventually approved, hastily. Pang said the decision to allow Leung to take up employment with a major property developer was based on papers and briefs provided by the Civil Service Bureau, which he considered to be sufficient and accurate at the time. The approval sparked a political storm.

Government offices
Preceded by Woo Kwok-hing	Chairman of Electoral Affairs Commission; 2006–2009	Succeeded by Barnabas Fung
