= Richard Field (judge) =

British judge (born 1947)

Sir Richard Alan Field (born 17 April 1947) is a British judge of the High Court of England and Wales.

== Academic career ==
Education: Ottershaw School, Univ of Bristol (LLB), LSE (LLM).

Field was an assistant professor at the University of British Columbia Faculty of Law from 1969 until becoming a lecturer at the University of Hong Kong in 1971. He served as an associate professor at the McGill University Faculty of Law in Montreal from 1973 to 1977.

== Legal career ==
Field was called to the bar at Inner Temple in 1977 and later made a bencher. He became a Queen's Counsel in 1987. Field was appointed a Recorder in 1999. On 11 January 2002, he was appointed a High Court judge, receiving the customary knighthood, and assigned to the Queen's Bench Division. He served as presiding judge of the Western Circuit from 2009 to 2012. He retired on 31 August 2014. He has since sat on a number of occasions as a Deputy High Court Judge in the Commercial Court.

Field was Cheng Yu Tung Visiting Professor in the Faculty of Law at the University of Hong Kong between 2014 and 2015.

Field currently acts as an arbitrator. He also sits part-time as a Deputy Judge of the High Court of Hong Kong (where he is given a Chinese name "范堯輝" by the Hong Kong Judiciary), a Justice of Appeal of the Cayman Islands Court of Appeal and a Justice of the DIFC Courts.
