= Poon Siu-tung =

Hong Kong judge (born 1967)

The Honourable Mr Justice Poon Siu-tung
- 潘兆童

Judge of the Court of First Instance of the High Court
- Incumbent
- Assumed office 2019

Chief District Judge
- In office 2012–2019
- Preceded by: Patrick Li
- Succeeded by: Justin Ko

District Judge
- In office 2009–2012

Permanent Magistrate
- In office 2002–2009

Personal details
- Born: 1967 (age 58–59) Hong Kong
- Education: University of Hong Kong

Poon Siu-tung, also known as Tony Poon (Chinese: 潘兆童; born 1967) is a Hong Kong judge. He has served as a Judge of the Court of First Instance of the High Court since January 2019.

Since October 2020, Poon has served as a Panel Judge handling interception and surveillance authorisation requests from law enforcement agencies.

He is a member of the Executive Committee and the Digital Transformation Committee of the Society of Rehabilitation and Crime Prevention of Hong Kong.

== Education and legal career ==
Poon studied in St. Francis of Assis College in Kowloon After that he received an LLB in 1990 and a PCLL in 1993 from the University of Hong Kong. He was called to the Hong Kong Bar in 1994 and was a barrister in private practice until 2002.

== Judicial career ==
In 2002, Poon joined the bench as a Permanent Magistrate. He sat as a Presiding Officer of the Labour Tribunal from 2003 to 2005.

Poon sat as a District Court Master from 2005 to 2006. He sat as a Deputy District Judge from 2006 to 2009. In 2009, he became a District Judge. In 2010, he was made Acting Chief District Judge. In 2012, he was appointed as Chief District Judge.

Poon sat as a Deputy High Court Judge from 2014 to 2019.

In 2017, he was appointed as Judge with special responsibility for the Executive Body of the Hong Kong Judicial Institute. In this capacity, he is responsible for strategic plans and the implementation of judicial training programmes.

In 2019, he was appointed as a High Court Judge.

Poon has sat in the Court of Appeal in a number of civil and criminal appeal cases.

As Poon shares the same surname as two other High Court Judges (Mr Justice Jeremy Poon (the Chief Judge) and Madam Justice Maggie Poon (a Justice of Appeal)), in English decisions he is referred to as 'S T Poon J' rather than 'Poon J'.

=== Notable cases ===
In 2011, the trial of Stephen Chan Chi-wan in relation to the 2010 TVB corruption scandal took place in the District Court before Poon, who acquitted Chan and the co-defendants. On appeal, in 2012 the Court of Appeal set aside the not guilty verdicts and remitted the case to Poon to consider if the defendants could rely on the defence of reasonable excuse. In 2013, Poon ruled that the defendants could rely on such a defence and therefore dismissed the charges afresh. On appeal, in 2015 the Court of Appeal once again allowed the appeal and directed Poon to convict Chan and his co-defendant (Tseng Pei Kun) on the charge of conspiring for an agent to accept an advantage and sentence them accordingly. Poon subsequently sentenced Chan to a fine of HK$84,000 and Tseng to a fine of HK$28,000. On further appeal, in 2017 the Court of Final Appeal overturned the decision of the Court of Appeal and re-instated Poon's original decision by quashing the defendants' convictions and acquitting them of all charges.

In 2012, Poon heard a case in the District Court involving a Tuen Mun District Councillor who put up banners stating “Demand the Integrated Community Centre for Mental Wellness (ICCMW) to be relocated far away from Wu King Estate residents”. The plaintiff was a person with mental illness who argued that the Councillor had committed an act of disability vilification. Poon held that the banners incited hatred against people with disabilities, and ruled in favour of the plaintiff, whom he awarded nominal damages of HK$1.

In 2013, Poon heard and dismissed an application by Lew Mon-hung in the District Court for a permanent stay of proceedings in respect of a charge of perverting the course of justice relating to a letter sent to the Chief Executive, Leung Chun-ying, and the Commissioner of the ICAC, Simon Peh, with a view to influence them to halt the ICAC's investigation against him.
