= Susan Kwan =

Hong Kong judge

The Honourable Madam Justice Susan Kwan Shuk-hing VP
- 關淑馨

Vice President of the Court of Appeal of the High Court
- Incumbent
- Assumed office 2019

Justice of Appeal of the Court of Appeal of the High Court
- In office 2009–2019

Judge of the Court of First Instance of the High Court
- In office 2001–2009

Deputy Registrar of the High Court
- In office 1999–2001

Personal details
- Born: 1954 (age 71–72) Macau
- Education: University of Hong Kong

Susan Kwan Shuk-hing (Chinese: 關淑馨; born 1954) is a Hong Kong judge. She has served as a Vice President of the Court of Appeal since April 2019.

== Legal and judicial career ==
Kwan received an LLB in 1977 and a PCLL in 1978 from the University of Hong Kong. She was called to the Hong Kong Bar in 1979 and was a barrister in private practice until 1999. She was Honorary Secretary of the Hong Kong Bar Association from 1996 to 1999.

In 1999, Kwan was appointed as Deputy Registrar of the High Court. In 2001, she was appointed as a Judge of the Court of First Instance of the High Court. In 2002, she was appointed as the Judge in charge of the Companies and Bankruptcy List.

In 2009, Kwan was elevated to the Court of Appeal. In 2019, she was the first woman to be appointed as Vice President of the Court of Appeal.

Kwan is Editor-in-Chief of Company Law in Hong Kong: Insolvency and Company Law in Hong Kong: Practice and Procedure.

In October 2022, Kwan was part of a team of 3 judges who ruled against Jimmy Lai and said that "despite its importance to the freedom of the press, the protection afforded to journalistic material is not absolute."
