= Electoral Affairs Commission =

Commission of Hong Kong related to elections

- 選舉管理委員會
- Logo of the Commission since 2023

Agency overview
- Formed: 29 September 1997
- Preceding agency: Boundary and Election Commission (選區分界及選舉事務委員會)
- Jurisdiction: Hong Kong
- Headquarters: 10th floor, Harbour Centre, 25 Harbour Road, Wan Chai, Hong Kong
- Agency executive: Mr Justice David Lok, Chairman
- Parent department: Constitutional and Mainland Affairs Bureau
- Key document: Electoral Affairs Commission Ordinance
- Website: www.eac.gov.hk

Electoral Affairs Commission
- Traditional Chinese: 選舉管理委員會
- Simplified Chinese: 选举管理委员会
Transcriptions
Standard Mandarin
- Hanyu Pinyin: Xuǎnjǔ Guǎnlǐwěiyuánhuì
Yue: Cantonese
- Yale Romanization: Syún géui gún léih wái yùhn wuih
- Jyutping: Syun^{2} geoi^{2} gun^{2} lei^{5} wai^{2} jyun^{4} wui^{6}

The Electoral Affairs Commission (EAC) is the body that oversees electoral matters in Hong Kong. Established under the Electoral Affairs Commission Ordinance, its main functions include considering or reviewing the boundaries of Legislative Council geographical constituencies and constituencies of the 18 District Councils for the purpose of making recommendations, and overseeing the conduct and supervision of elections and regulating the procedures at an election. It is also responsible for supervision of the registration of electors and the promotional activities relating to registration.

== History ==
In 1997, the EAC succeeded the former Boundary and Election Commission (選區分界及選舉事務委員會), which was established on 23 July 1993. It is headed by a chairman, a position which has always been filled a High Court (formerly known as Supreme Court) judge. The executive body that is responsible for elections is the Registration and Electoral Office (選舉事務處), which reports to the Secretary for Constitutional and Mainland Affairs (the Secretary for Constitutional Affairs before 1 July 2007).

== Chairman ==
#	Name	Tenure start	Tenure end	Tenure length
1	Woo Kwok-hing, GBS	29 September 1997	16 August 2006	8 years and 322 days
2	Pang Kin-kee, SBS	17 August 2006	16 August 2009	3 years and 0 days
3	Barnabas Fung Wah, GBS	17 August 2009	16 August 2022	13 years and 0 days
4	David Lok Kai-hong	1 September 2022	Incumbent	4 years and 75 days

== See also ==
- Boundary commission
- Election management body
