= Hong Kong High Court =

Superior court of record

High Court of the Hong Kong Special Administrative Region
- 香港特別行政區高等法院
- Interactive map of High Court of the Hong Kong Special Administrative Region
- 22°16′42″N 114°09′48″E
- Jurisdiction: Hong Kong
- Location: 38 Queensway, Admiralty, Hong Kong
- Coordinates: 22°16′42″N 114°09′48″E
- Authorised by: Hong Kong Basic Law and High Court Ordinance
- Appeals to: Court of Final Appeal
- Website: judiciary.hk

Chief Judge of the High Court
- Currently: The Honourable Mr Justice Jeremy Poon Shiu-chor, CJHC

Hong Kong High Court
- Traditional Chinese: 香港特別行政區高等法院
- Simplified Chinese: 香港特别行政区高等法院
Transcriptions
Standard Mandarin
- Hanyu Pinyin: Xiānggǎng Tèbiéxíngzhèngqū Gāoděngfǎyuàn
Yue: Cantonese
- Yale Romanization: Hēung góng dahk biht hàhng jing kēui gōu dáng faat yún
- Jyutping: Hoeng1 gong2 dak6 bit6 hang4 zing3 koei1 gou1 dang2 faat3 jun2

The High Court of the Hong Kong Special Administrative Region consists of the upper Court of Appeal and the lower Court of First Instance. The high court is part of the Judiciary of Hong Kong. It also deals with criminal and civil cases which have risen beyond the lower courts.

The hierarchy of the Hong Kong judiciary from high to low is: the Court of Final Appeal, the High Court (consisting of the upper Court of Appeal and the lower Court of First Instance), the District Court, and magistrates' courts.

It is a superior court of record of unlimited civil and criminal jurisdiction. It was named the Supreme Court before 1997. Though previously named the Supreme Court, this Court has long been the local equivalent to the Senior Courts of England and Wales and has never been vested with the power of final adjudication.

== Composition ==
=== Eligibility and appointment ===
A person who has practised for at least 10 years as a barrister, advocate, solicitor or judicial officer in Hong Kong or another common law jurisdiction is eligible to be appointed as a High Court Judge or Recorder. A person who has practised for at least 5 years as a barrister, advocate, solicitor or judicial officer in Hong Kong or another common law jurisdiction is eligible to be appointed as the Registrar or a Master.

Full-time Judges and Recorders, as well as the Registrar and Masters, are appointed by the Chief Executive on the recommendation of the independent Judicial Officers Recommendation Commission (JORC).

Part-time Deputy Judges are appointed on a temporary basis by the Chief Justice.

It is not uncommon for a person to sit as a Recorder or Deputy High Court Judge prior to appointment as a full-time High Court Judge.

Newly appointed High Court judges with previous service as the Director of Public Prosecutions in the Department of Justice are subject to a 'sanitisation' period of 6 months upon appointment. During this period, the judge does not deal with any criminal trials or appeals or any civil cases involving the Government to maintain judicial independence and impartiality.

Upon appointment as a full-time High Court Judge, one must give an undertaking not to return to practise in future as a barrister or solicitor in Hong Kong.

The remuneration of High Court Judges is determined by the Chief Executive on the recommendation of the independent Standing Committee on Judicial Salaries and Conditions of Service. As of April 2023, a full-time Judge of the Court of First Instance receives a monthly salary of HK$343,750, while a Justice of Appeal of the Court of Appeal receives a monthly salary of HK$360,650. The Chief Judge of the High Court receives a monthly salary of HK$399,950, the same rate as a permanent judge in the Court of Final Appeal. Furthermore, full-time High Court judges are provided with housing in Judiciary Quarters or, alternatively, a housing allowance at HK$182,593 per month. This is given alongside allowances in medical insurance, judicial dress, and local education that are also enjoyed by judges at all levels. As of 1 April 2020, Recorders and Deputy High Court Judges receive honoraria at a daily rate of HK$11,765.

The retirement age of full-time High Court Judges is 70. However, the term of office can be extended further up to the age of 75.

=== Chief Judge of the High Court ===
The Chief Judge of the High Court is the principal officer of the High Court and the President of the Court of Appeal. The Chief Judge is responsible for the administration of the High Court and is accountable to the Chief Justice, who is head of the Judiciary. The Chief Judge must be a Chinese citizen who is a Hong Kong permanent resident with no right of abode in any foreign country.

The Judges who have held the position of Chief Judge of the High Court of Hong Kong to date are:

1. Patrick Chan Siu-oi (1997–2000)
2. Arthur Leong Siu-chung (2000–2003)
3. Geoffrey Ma Tao-li (2003–2010)
4. Andrew Cheung Kui-nung (2011–2018)
5. Jeremy Poon Shiu-chor (2019–present)

For pre-1997 Chief Justices, see: Chief Justice of the Supreme Court of Hong Kong

=== Full-time judges ===
Full-time High Court judges are given the prefix 'the Honourable' and referred to as 'Mr/Madam/Mrs Justice [surname]'. The Chief Judge of the High Court may be referred to in writing by adding the post-nominal 'CJHC'. Vice Presidents of the Court of Appeal may be referred to in writing by adding the post-nominal 'VP'. Justices of Appeal may be referred to in writing by adding the post-nominal "JA".

In 1995, Mrs Justice Doreen Le Pichon was the first woman to be appointed as a High Court judge. She subsequently became the first woman to be appointed as a Justice of Appeal in 2000. In 2019, Madam Justice Susan Kwan was the first woman to be appointed as Vice President of the Court of Appeal.

The current full-time judges of the High Court (as at 30 October 2026) are (ranked according to the priority of their respective appointments; Senior Counsels indicated by an asterisk *):

Chief Judge of the High Court

- Jeremy Poon Shiu-chor, CJHC

Justices of Appeal of the Court of Appeal of the High Court

- *Andrew Colin Macrae, VP
- Susan Kwan Shuk-hing, VP
- Carlye Chu Fun-ling, VP
- Peter Cheung Chak-yau, JA
- *Aarif Tyebjee Barma, JA
- Derek Pang Wai-cheong, JA
- *Kevin Paul Zervos, JA
- Thomas Au Hing-cheung, JA
- *Godfrey Lam Wan-ho, JA
- *Anderson Chow Ka-ming, JA
- *Anthony Chan Kin-keung, JA
- *Keith Yeung Kar-hung, JA
- *Russell Adam Coleman, JA
- Alex Lee Wan-tang, JA

Judges of the Court of First Instance of the High Court

- Barnabas Fung Wah, GBS
- *Jonathan Russell Harris
- Queeny Au-Yeung Kwai-yue, SBS (Judge in charge of the Constitutional and Administrative Law List)
- Esther Toh Lye-ping
- Andrew Chan Hing-wai
- Mimmie Chan Mei-lan (Judge in charge of the Commercial List and the Construction and Arbitration List)
- *Peter Ng Kar-fai
- David Lok (Judge in charge of the Intellectual Property List)
- Susana Maria D'Almada Remedios
- *Lisa Wong Kwok-ying
- Poon Siu-tung
- *Linda Chan Ching-fan (Judge in charge of the Companies and Insolvency List)
- Johnny Chan Jong-herng
- *Anna Lai Yuen-kee, BBS
- *Yvonne Cheng Wai-sum
- Herbert Au-Yeung Ho-wing
- Winnie Tsui Wan-wah
- Leung Chun-man
- Douglas Yau Tak-hong
- Anthony Kwok Kai-on
- Amanda Jane Woodcock
- *William Tam Yiu-ho
- *Eugene Fung Ting-sek

A Justice of Appeal may sit as an additional Judge of the Court of First Instance. (Note: For example, Mr Justice Macrae, JA sat as an additional Judge of the Court of First Instance in HKSAR v Rafael Hui HCCC 98/2013) A Judge of the Court of First Instance may also hear cases in the Court of Appeal, including as a single Judge (for example, when determining applications for leave to appeal in criminal cases).

Cases in the Court of First Instance are usually heard by a single Judge, though important cases may be heard by a bench consisting of more than one Judge, although this is very rare. (Note: For example, Z v Director of Legal Aid [2011] 4 HKLRD 362 (CFI), was heard before Mr Justice Reyes and Mr Justice Wright. Kissel v The Long-term Prison Sentences Review Board [2018] 2 HKLRD 1270, [2018] HKCFI 1085 and A v Chief Executive of HKSAR [2013] 4 HKLRD 404 (CFI) were heard before Mr Justice Au and Mr Justice Andrew Chan.) This practice is similar to the English High Court, where important cases may be heard by a divisional court consisting of a three- or two-member bench.

All judges of the Court of First Instance also serve as members of the Competition Tribunal. The President and Deputy President of the Competition Tribunal (currently Mr Justice Harris and Madam Justice Au-Yeung respectively) are appointed by the Chief Executive on the recommendation of the Judicial Officers Recommendation Commission.

The President of the Lands Tribunal must be a High Court Judge (currently Madam Justice Winnie Tsui) and is appointed by the Chief Executive.

==== Non-judicial roles ====
High Court judges also serve a number of other public service roles. It is a statutory requirement that the Electoral Affairs Commission be headed by a chairman who is a High Court judge (currently Mr Justice Lok) appointed by the Chief Executive in consultation with the Chief Justice. The Electoral Affairs Commission must appoint a Judge of the Court of Final Appeal or a High Court Judge to act as returning officer for elections for the Chief Executive of Hong Kong. Similarly, it is a statutory requirement that the Chief Executive appoint a serving or retired High Court judge to be Commissioner on Interception of Communications and Surveillance (currently Mr Justice Suffiad). The Chief Executive also appoints three to six Judges of the Court of First Instance (currently Mr Justice Fung, Mr Justice Bharwaney and Madam Justice Lisa Wong) on the recommendation of the Chief Justice to serve as panel judges handling interception and surveillance authorisation requests from law enforcement agencies. Further, it is a statutory requirement that the Chief Executive appoint at least 2 serving or retired High Court Judges as members of the Long-term Prison Sentences Review Board. At present, Mr Justice Pang Kin-kee and Mr Justice Wilson Chan are President and Deputy President respectively of the Long-term Prison Sentences Review Board. It is also a statutory requirement that the Chief Executive appoint a retired High Court Judge, District Judge or magistrate as Chairman of the Appeal Board on Public Meetings and Processions (currently Mr Justice Pang Kin-kee). In addition, it is a statutory requirement that the Chief Executive appoint a serving or retired High Court Judge or Deputy High Court Judge to chair the Market Misconduct Tribunal (MMT) and the Securities and Futures Appeals Tribunal (SFAT). At present, Mr Justice Lunn (former Vice President of the Court of Appeal), Mr Justice Hartmann (former Justice of Appeal), Kenneth Kwok SC (former Recorder of the Court of First Instance) and Judge Tallentire (former Deputy High Court Judge) are Chairmen of the MMT and SFAT.

The Chief Executive may appoint a High Court judge to lead a public inquiry. For example, Mr Justice Andrew Chan was appointed in 2015 as Chairman of the Inquiry into incidents of excess lead found in drinking water, and Mr Justice Lunn, JA was appointed in 2012 as Chairman of the Inquiry into the collision of vessels near Lamma Island.

A number of serving and retired Hong Kong High Court Judges also sit as Supreme Court Judges in Brunei. For example, while Mr Justice Rogers served as Vice President of the Hong Kong Court of Appeal, he also sat as a non-resident Judicial Commissioner of the Supreme Court of Brunei Darussalam between 2010 and 2011. As of 2019, three retired Hong Kong High Court Judges sit as Judges of the Court of Appeal of Brunei Darussalam (Mr Justice Burrell, who is the President of the Brunei Court of Appeal, and Mr Justice Seagroatt and Mr Justice Lunn, who are Justices of Appeal); two retired Hong Kong High Court Judges sit as Judicial Commissioners of the High Court of Brunei Darussalam (Mr Justice Findlay and Mr Justice Lugar-Mawson). Another retired Hong Kong Judge, Edward Woolley, who previously sat as a Deputy High Court Judge and High Court Master, also sits as a Judicial Commissioner of the Supreme Court of Brunei Darussalam.

=== Recorders ===
Recorders of the court of first instance of the high court are practitioners in private practice (in practice, Senior Counsel) who are appointed for a fixed term of a few years and sit for a few weeks in a year. Recorders may exercise all the jurisdiction, powers and privileges of a full-time Judge of the Court of First Instance.

The recordership scheme was introduced in 1994 to encourage experienced practitioners who are willing to sit as a High Court Judge for a few weeks every year, but are not prepared to commit themselves to a permanent, full-time appointment. It was intended to act as a more formal system of appointment compared to the more ad hoc nature of appointment of Deputy High Court Judges.

The current Recorders of the Court of First Instance of the High Court (as at 23 March 2026 are (ranked according to the priority of their respective appointments):

1. Mr Martin Hui Siu-ting, SC of Plowman Chambers
2. Ms Sit Yat-wah, SC of Temple Chambers
3. Ms Rachel Lam Yan-kay, SC of Des Voeux Chambers
4. Mr Wong Ming-fung, BBS, SC of Des Voeux Chambers
5. Mr Victor Dawes, BBS, SC of Temple Chambers
6. Mr Richard Khaw Wei-kiang, SC of Temple Chambers
7. Mr José-Antonio Maurellet, SC of Des Voeux Chambers
8. Mr Abraham Chan Lok-shung, SC of Temple Chambers
9. Mr Pao Jin-long, SC of Temple Chambers
10. Ms Maggie Wong Pui-kei, SC of Plowman Chambers
11. Mr Derek Chan Ching-lung, SC of Plowman Chambers
12. Mr Jenkin Suen, SC of Des Voeux Chambers
13. Mr Eric Kwok Tung-ming, BBS, SC of Courtyard Chambers

=== Part-time Deputy Judges ===
The Chief Justice appoints on a temporary basis a number of serving full-time District Court Judges, serving judges of other common law jurisdictions, (Note: Such as Mr Justice Nick Segal (Judge of the Grand Court of the Cayman Islands (Financial Services Division) and an Assistant Justice of the Supreme Court of Bermuda), who decided cases including Aggressive Construction Company Ltd v SKK (H.K.) Co Ltd [2025] HKCFI 4536) retired High Court Judges (Note: Including retired English High Court Judges, such as Sir Richard Field who decided cases including Diyixian.com Limited v G'Five International Limited [2016] 5 HKLRD 495 (CFI)) and practitioners in private practice (in general, barristers who are senior counsels or solicitors who are senior partners with litigation experience) to sit as part-time Deputy High Court Judges. Before 1983, the position of Deputy High Court Judge was known as Commissioner.

A Deputy High Court Judge may exercise all the jurisdiction, powers and privileges of a full-time Judge of the Court of First Instance.

A Deputy High Court Judge may also be requested to sit in the Court of Appeal. This happened for the first time when retired Justice of Appeal, Doreen Le Pichon, was appointed as a Deputy High Court Judge and requested to hear the appeal in Ghazi Faidi v Qantex Capital Markets Limited [2025] HKCA 236 on 25 February 2025.

Judicial review cases are not listed before part-time Judges. (Note: This restriction does not apply to serving District Judges sitting as Deputy High Court Judges. For example, Her Honour Judge Amanda Woodcock has decided a number of judicial review cases (such as Hameed Bilal v Torture Claims Appeal Board (unreported, HCAL 174/2017, 21 July 2017)), while His Honour Judge Kent Yee decided the habeas corpus case of Mohammad Aslam Qureshi v Director of Immigration (unreported, HCAL 75/2015, 27 May 2015). An exception is also made for Deputy High Court Judges (Non-refoulement Claims) when hearing judicial review cases relating to non-refoulement claims. Nor does this restriction apply to retired High Court Judges. For example, Sir Brian Keith (sitting as a Deputy High Court Judge) decided Building Authority v Appeal Tribunal (Buildings) [2016] 1 HKLRD 1381 (CFI). Previously, practitioners in private practice sitting as a Deputy High Court Judge could decide judicial review cases. For example, Robert Kotewall QC decided Chan Lau Fong & Others v Attorney General (unreported, HCMP 3232/1990, 30 January 1991).)

In February 2025, Teresa Wu (a practising barrister at Des Voeux Chambers) became the first person to be appointed by the Chief Justice as a Deputy High Court Judge (Non-refoulement Claims). Under the terms of appointment, a Deputy High Court Judge (Non-refoulement Claims) only hears judicial review cases relating to non-refoulement claims. She handed down the first judicial decision given by a Deputy High Court Judge (Non-refoulement Claims) in Akter Mousume v Torture Claims Appeal Board/Non-refoulement Claims Petition Office [2025] HKCFI 567.

In order to ensure judicial independence and impartiality, part-time Judges are not permitted to participate actively in political activities (although membership of a political party is acceptable).

=== Forms of address ===
All High Court Judges (regardless of whether they are full-time Judges, Recorders or Deputy Judges on temporary appointment) are addressed in court as "My Lord" or "My Lady".

In court judgments and decisions, Vice Presidents of the Court of Appeal are referred to as '[surname] VP' or '[surname] V-P' (or in the plural as '[surname] and [surname] V-PP'). Justices of Appeal are referred to as '[surname] JA' (or in the plural as '[surname] and [surname] JJA'). Full-time Judges of the Court of First Instance are referred to as '[surname] J' (or in the plural as '[surname] and [surname] JJ'). Recorders are referred to as 'Mr/Madam/Mrs Recorder [surname]' (with the post-nominal 'SC' if they are Senior Counsel). Deputy High Court Judges are referred to either as 'Deputy Judge [surname]', 'Deputy High Court Judge [surname]' or 'DHCJ [surname]' (with the post-nominal 'SC' if they are Senior Counsel). (Note: King's Counsels sitting as a Deputy High Court Judge may be referred to with the post-nominal 'KC' ('QC' when the monarch is a female), even after the resumption of the exercise of sovereignty on 1 July 1997). For example, following retirement from the bench, when Mr Justice Stone sat as a Deputy High Court Judge, he was referred to as Deputy High Court Judge William Stone QC (see 廈門新景地集團有限公司 v Eton Properties Limited and Others (unreported, HCCL 13/2011, 14 June 2012); on appeal in [2016] 2 HKLRD 1106 (CA)).) Deputy High Court Judges were previously called Commissioners and were referred to as 'Mr/Madam/Mrs Commissioner [surname]' (with the post-nominal 'Q.C.' if they were Queen's Counsel) in judgments before 1983.

== Sittings ==
The High Court sits three times a year, namely:

- Winter: from 4 January to the Thursday before Easter Sunday;
- Spring; from the second Monday after Easter Sunday to 31 July; and
- Autumn: from 1 September to 23 December.

Periods during which the Court does not sit are known as vacation. The period between the Spring and Autumn sittings is known as summer vacation, during which no pleadings or amended pleadings may be served unless with leave of the Court.

== High Court Building ==
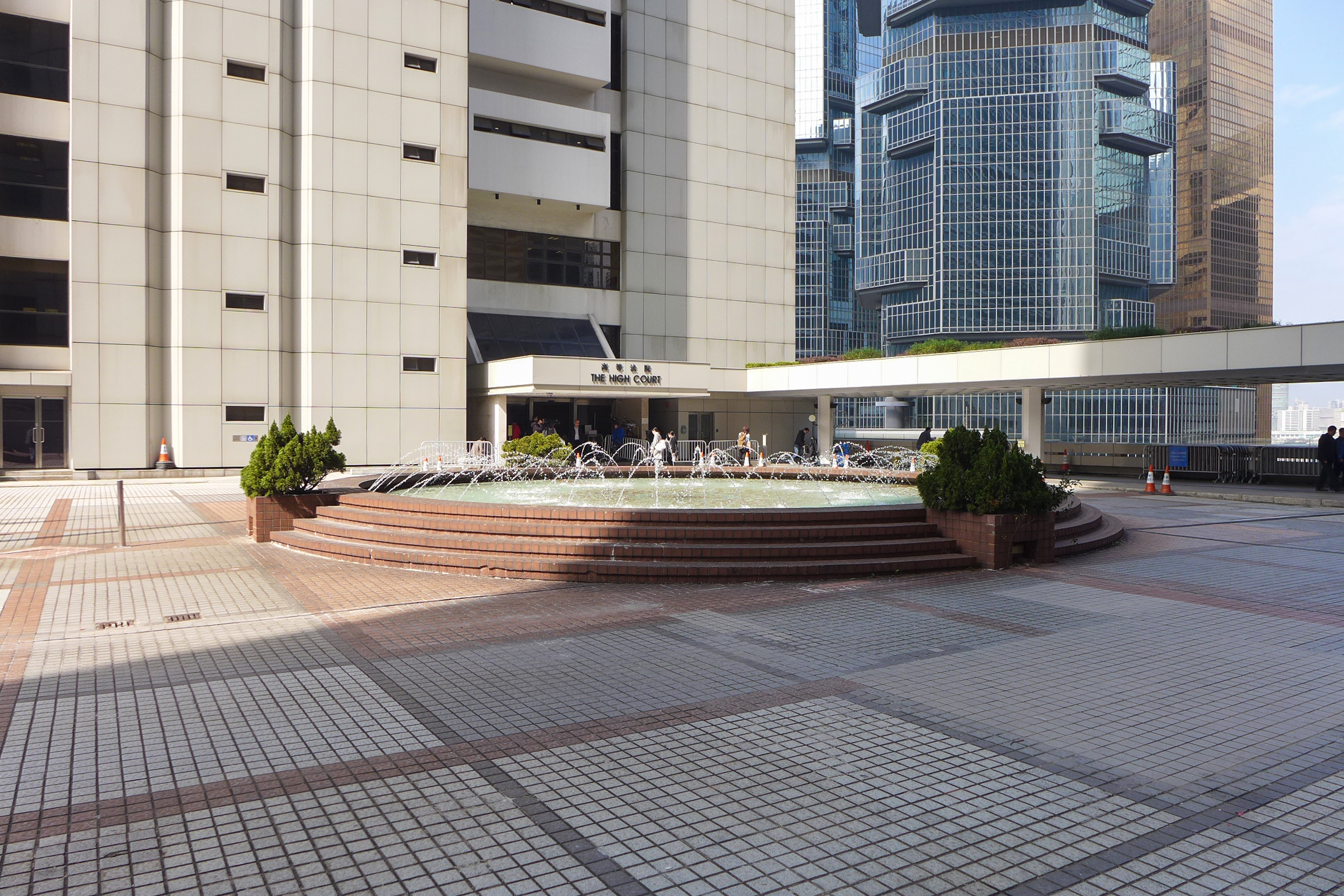
Entrance of the High Court in Admiralty

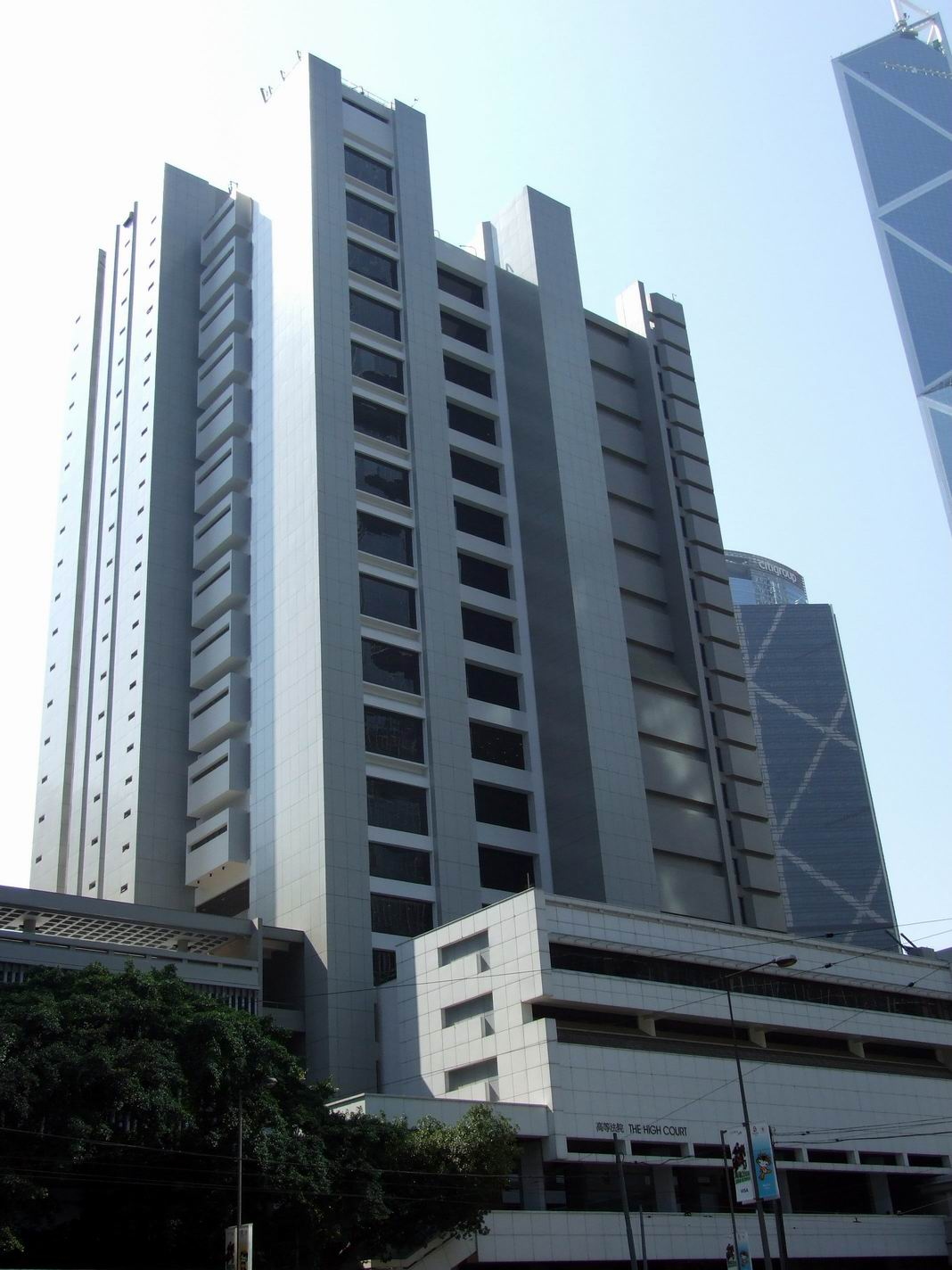
High Court Building façade viewed from Queensway in Admiralty

The High Court Building is located at 38 Queensway, Admiralty. The 20-storey building was built in 1985 as the home of the then Supreme Court of Hong Kong, which was renamed in 1997. It was named the Supreme Court Building, and the road leading to its main entrance is still named Supreme Court Road. The High Court Building was designed by architect K. M. Tseng.

The structure is a white clad tower and has a water fountain outside its front door.

Sometimes, the High Court may sit in another venue. For example, a serving District Judge sitting as a Deputy High Court Judge may hear a case in a courtroom situated in the District Court building. This is similar to England, where the High Court sometimes sits outside London in County Courts which act as High Court District Registries.

== Cases ==
In the Jimmy Lai case, the prosecution asked the High Court for an adjournment from 1 December 2022 to 8 December 2022; the High Court added a few more days and adjourned it until 13 December 2022. On 13 December 2022, the High Court further delayed the trial until September 2023, until after the NPCSC ruled in the matter.

== See also ==
- Judiciary of Hong Kong
- Law of Hong Kong
- Supreme Court (Hong Kong)
- Chief Justice of the Supreme Court of Hong Kong
