= Michael Lunn =

Hong Kong judge

The Honourable Mr Justice Michael Lunn GBS SC KC

Chairman of the Hong Kong Market Misconduct Tribunal and the Securities and Futures Appeals Tribunal
- Incumbent
- Assumed office 2019

Justice of Appeal of the Court of Appeal of Brunei Darussalam
- Incumbent
- Assumed office 2018

Vice-president of the Court of Appeal of Hong Kong
- In office 2014–2018

Justice of Appeal of the Court of Appeal of Hong Kong
- In office 2011–2014

Judge of the Court of First Instance of the High Court of Hong Kong
- In office 2003–2011

Recorder of the Court of First Instance of the High Court of Hong Kong
- In office 2000–2003

Personal details
- Born: 1950 (age 75–76) Southern Rhodesia
- Education: Davidson College; Queens' College, Cambridge

Michael Victor Lunn GBS SC KC (Chinese: 倫明高; born 1950) is a senior Hong Kong judge. He is Chairman of the Market Misconduct Tribunal and the Securities and Futures Appeals Tribunal in Hong Kong.

== Early life ==
Lunn was born in Rhodesia (now Zimbabwe) and was educated in England.

In 1968, he won a Richardson Foundation Scholarship to Davidson College in the United States.

He graduated from Queens' College, Cambridge with a BA in law in 1972.

== Legal career ==
In 1973, Lunn was called to the Bar in England and was admitted to Inner Temple. He was a barrister in private practice in England from 1974 to 1977.

He moved to British Hong Kong in 1977 and worked in the Attorney-General's Chambers until 1981. From 1982 to 2003, he was in private practice as a member of the Chambers of Gary Plowman, SC.

Lunn took silk in 1994.

He was vice chairman of the Hong Kong Bar Association from 2001 to 2003.

== Judicial career ==
Lunn was appointed as a Recorder of the Court of First Instance of the High Court of Hong Kong in 2000. He was appointed as a full-time judge of the Court of First Instance of the High Court of Hong Kong in 2003.

He was elevated to the Court of Appeal of Hong Kong in 2011 and became Vice President of the Court of Appeal in 2014.

Lunn was Chairman of the Market Misconduct Tribunal from 2005 to 2012.

In 2012, Lunn was appointed as Chairman of the Inquiry into the 2012 Lamma Island ferry collision.

After the 2018 Hong Kong bus accident, Lunn was appointed as chairman of the Independent Review Committee on Hong Kong's Franchised Bus Service.

Lunn retired from the Hong Kong Judiciary in 2018. On 1 July 2018, he was awarded the Gold Bauhinia Star by the chief executive in recognition of his dedicated and distinguished service in the Judiciary for 15 years.

Since October 2018, Lunn has been sitting as a justice of appeal of the Court of Appeal of Brunei Darussalam.

Lunn sat as a Deputy Judge of the High Court of Hong Kong in 2019 and 2020.

In 2019, Lunn was re-appointed as Chairman of the Market Misconduct Tribunal and the Securities and Futures Appeals Tribunal for a 3-year term until 2021. In 2021, Lunn's term was extended for 3 years until 2024. In 2024, his term was further extended until 2027.
