= Hong Kong District Court =

Intermediate court of Hong Kong

District Court
- 香港特別行政區地區法院
- Interactive map of District Court
- 22°16′48.02″N 114°10′20.48″E
- Established: 18 February 1953
- Jurisdiction: Hong Kong
- Location: 12 Harbour Road, Wan Chai, Victoria, Hong Kong Island; Hong Kong
- Coordinates: 22°16′48.02″N 114°10′20.48″E
- Authorised by: Hong Kong Basic Law
- Appeals to: Court of Appeal
- Website: judiciary.hk

Chief District Judge
- Currently: Justin Ko

Hong Kong District Court
- Traditional Chinese: 區域法院
- Simplified Chinese: 区域法院
Transcriptions
Standard Mandarin
- Hanyu Pinyin: Qūyù Fǎyuàn
Yue: Cantonese
- Yale Romanization: Kēui wihk faat yuhn
- Jyutping: Keoi1 wik6 faat3 jyun6

Pre-handover name
- Traditional Chinese: 地方法院
Transcriptions
Yue: Cantonese
- Yale Romanization: Deih fōng faat yuhn
- Jyutping: Dei6 fong1 faat3 jyun6

The District Court (in case citations, HKDC) is the intermediate court in Hong Kong, having limited criminal and civil jurisdictions.

The hierarchy of the Hong Kong judiciary from high to low is: the Court of Final Appeal, the High Court (consisting of the upper Court of Appeal and the lower Court of First Instance), the District Court, and magistrates' courts.

The District Court was first established in 1953 with the enactment of the District Court Ordinance, and is roughly equivalent to the County Court of England and Wales in terms of its civil jurisdiction. From 1991 to 2020, the court sat exclusively in the Wanchai Law Courts, Wanchai Tower, 12 Harbour Road, until the increase in protest-related cases with large numbers of defendants necessitated some trials to be conducted in the West Kowloon Law Courts Building, the Eastern Law Courts Building, and the Tsuen Wan Law Courts Building instead.

Until March 1991, there were six district courts, namely Victoria, Kowloon, Fanling, Tsuen Wan, Tuen Mun and Sha Tin, before being amalgamated into the current single District Court in March 1991.

== Jurisdiction ==
=== Civil jurisdiction ===
18th of February, 1953. The District Court has limited civil jurisdiction. For a contract, quasi-contract or tort claim to be handled by the District Court, it should be for an amount over HK$75,000 but not more than HK$3 million. If the claim is more than HK$3 million, the claim can still be pursued in the District Court (instead of the Court of First Instance of the High Court) provided that the excess is abandoned. If the claim is HK$75,000 or less, an adverse costs order may be made against the winning plaintiff due to pursuing its claim in the wrong court.

If the plaintiff's claim does not exceed HK$3 million, but the defendant counterclaims for over HK$3 million, the claim and the counterclaim (or the counterclaim only) may be transferred to the Court of First Instance of the High Court. For good reasons, the District Court may continue to handle the whole case even when the counterclaim exceeds HK$3 million, but a report has to be made to the High Court, which may order that the case be transferred.

As to claims for possession of land, the District Court can deal with buildings or premises the annual rent or rateable value or the annual value of which does not exceed HK$320,000.

If a claimant invokes the District Court's equity jurisdiction, the above limits are equally applicable, except that in proceedings wholly relating to land, the maximum value shall not exceed HK$7 million.

Distraint claims are handled by the District Court.

The District Court has exclusive jurisdiction to determine claims for compensation payable under the Employees' Compensation Ordinance (Cap. 282), regardless of the amount. Such claims are governed by the Employees' Compensation (Rules of Court) Rules (Cap. 282B) and Practice Direction 18.2.

The District Court has exclusive jurisdiction to deal with claims made under the Sex Discrimination Ordinance (Cap. 480), the Disability Discrimination Ordinance (Cap. 487), the Family Status Discrimination Ordinance (Cap. 527) and the Race Discrimination Ordinance (Cap. 602). Such claims are governed by the District Court Equal Opportunities Rules (Cap. 336G) and Practice Direction SL8.

The District Court has jurisdiction to handle claims by the Inland Revenue Department against defaulting taxpayers to recover outstanding tax due to the Government, regardless of the amount. The District Court also hears appeals from taxpayers against assessments by the Collector of Stamp Duty.

=== Criminal jurisdiction ===
The system is modelled after the English legal system, with indictable offences being taken up by the District Court if they are transferred from the magistrate's court.

The District Court hears all serious cases except murder, manslaughter rape and dangerous drug cases where large quantities of drugs have been seized, and can impose a sentence of up to seven years. Cases are heard in either the Cantonese or English language.

A District Court Judge sits alone without a jury. From its establishment in 1953 there have been no juries in the district court. The Attorney General at the time the District Court Ordinance was passed, Arthur Ridehalgh, explained to the Legislative Council that juries were "not infallible" and only a "means to an end" and that every practitioner will have come across cases where a verdict of not guilty was either a "stupid or perverse one." Judges would be required to give reasons for verdict would should be sufficient safeguard.

== Composition ==
=== Eligibility and appointment ===
A person who has practised for at least 5 years as a barrister, advocate, solicitor or judicial officer in Hong Kong or another common law jurisdiction is eligible to be appointed as a Judge, Registrar or Master of the District Court.

District Judges, as well as the Registrar and Masters of the District Court, are appointed by the Chief Executive on the recommendation of the independent Judicial Officers Recommendation Commission (JORC).

Limited-term or vacancy-filling Deputy District Judges may be appointed by the Chief Justice.

It is not uncommon for a person to sit as a short-term Deputy District Judge prior to appointment in a permanent capacity.

In 1986, Judge Helen Lo was the first woman to be appointed as a District Judge.

District judges are mandated to retire at age 65.

=== Chief District Judge ===
The Chief District Judge is the Court Leader of the District Court.

The Judges who have held the position of Chief District Judge to date are:

No.	Name	Chinese name	Tenure Start	Tenure End	Tenure Length	Reason for Tenure End	Subsequent Most Senior Judicial Role
1	Clare-Marie Beeson, SBS	貝珊	1 July 1997	30 November 1997	153 days	Appointed Judge of the Court of First Instance	Same (retired)
2	Richard Neville Hawkes, BBS	韓敬善	19 March 1999	15 May 2001	2 years and 58 days	Retired	None (retired)
3	Barnabas Fung Wah, GBS	馮驊	16 May 2001	26 November 2006	5 years and 195 days	Appointed Judge of the Court of First Instance	Same
4	Patrick Li Hon-leung	李瀚良	2 July 2008	15 August 2012	4 years and 45 days	Appointed Judge of the Court of First Instance	Same (retired)
5	Poon Siu-tung	潘兆童	17 September 2012	13 January 2019	6 years and 119 days	Appointed Judge of the Court of First Instance	Same
6	Justin Ko King-sau	高勁修	6 January 2020	Incumbent	6 years and 305 days		

=== District Judges ===
District Judges are referred to as 'His/Her Honour Judge [surname]'.

The Judges of the District Court (as of 3 December 2024) are (ranked by seniority):

Chief District Judge

- Justin Ko

Principal Family Court Judge

- C K Chan (Note: Sitting as a High Court Master until 31 March 2025)

District Judges

- Stanley Chan (Note: Previously sat as a Deputy High Court Judge)
- Eddie Yip
- Frankie Yiu (Note: Sitting as a Deputy High Court Judge until 30 September 2025)
- W K Kwok
- Josiah Lam (Note: Previously sat as a Deputy High Court Judge)
- Jack Wong (Note: Sitting as a High Court Master until 28 November 2025)
- Gary Lam (Note: Previously sat as a Deputy High Court Judge)
- Andrew Li (Note: Sitting as a Deputy High Court Judge until 31 May 2025)
- Harold Leong (Note: Previously sat as a High Court Master)
- Kent Yee (Note: Sitting as a Deputy High Court Judge until 10 September 2025. Previously sat as a High Court Master.)
- C P Pang (Note: Previously sat as a Deputy High Court Judge and as a High Court Master)
- Simon Lo (Note: Previously sat as a High Court Master)
- Isaac Tam (Note: Previously sat as a Deputy High Court Judge)
- Angela Kot (Note: Sitting as a High Court Master until 30 November 2025)
- George Own
- Grace Chan (Note: Previously sat as a High Court Master)
- Ivan Wong
- M K Liu (Note: Sitting as a Deputy High Court Judge until 30 September 2025. Previously sat as a High Court Master)
- Edmond Lee (Note: Sitting as a Deputy High Court Judge until 30 June 2025. Previously sat as a High Court Master.)
- Clement Lee
- Ernest Lin
- Adriana Tse Ching (Note: Previously sat as a High Court Master)
- K C Chan (Note: Previously sat as a Deputy High Court Judge)
- Phoebe Man (Note: Sitting as a High Court Master until 30 September 2025. Previously sat as a Deputy High Court Judge.)
- Lily Wong
- Kathie Cheung
- Thelma Kwan
- Jonathan Wong (Note: Sitting as a Deputy High Court Judge until 4 April 2025)
- Elaine Liu, BBS
- Dick Ho (Note: Sitting as a High Court Master until 30 November 2025)
- Ada Yim
- S P Yip (Note: Sitting as a High Court Master until 30 November 2025)
- Grace Chow (Note: Sitting as a Deputy High Court Judge until 30 September 2025)
- Alan Kwong (Note: Sitting as a Deputy High Court Judge until 31 October 2025)
- Phillis Loh
- Liza Jane Cruden
- Gary C C Lam (Note: Sitting as a Deputy High Court Judge until 28 November 2025)
- Michelle Lam
- S H Lee

Pursuant to a general power of appointment to vacancies or on a temporary basis under sections 10 and 37A of the High Court Ordinance, Cap. 4, the Chief Justice frequently makes short-term appointments of District Court judges to sit in the High Court as a Deputy Judge or Master.

All District Judges are, by virtue of their office, Presiding Officers of the Lands Tribunal. In practice, however, only certain District Judges are assigned to hear cases in the Lands Tribunal.

=== Deputy District Judges ===
The Chief Justice appoints on a temporary basis a number of Permanent Magistrates, retired judges and practitioners in private practice to sit as Deputy District Judges. A Deputy District Judge may exercise all the jurisdiction, powers and privileges of a District Judge.

All Deputy District Judges are, by virtue of their office, Presiding Officers of the Lands Tribunal. In practice, however, only certain Deputy District Judges are assigned to hear cases in the Lands Tribunal.

=== Forms of address ===
All Judges of the District Court (regardless of whether Chief District Judge, Judges or Deputy Judges) are addressed in court as "Your Honour".

In court judgments and decisions, District Judges are referred to as 'His/Her Honour Judge [surname]', 'HH Judge [surname]' or 'HHJ [surname]'. Deputy District Judges are referred to as 'Deputy District Judge [surname]' or 'DDJ [surname]'.

== See also ==
- Judiciary of Hong Kong
