= Magistrates' court (Hong Kong) =

Lowest criminal court of Hong Kong

Magistrates' courts
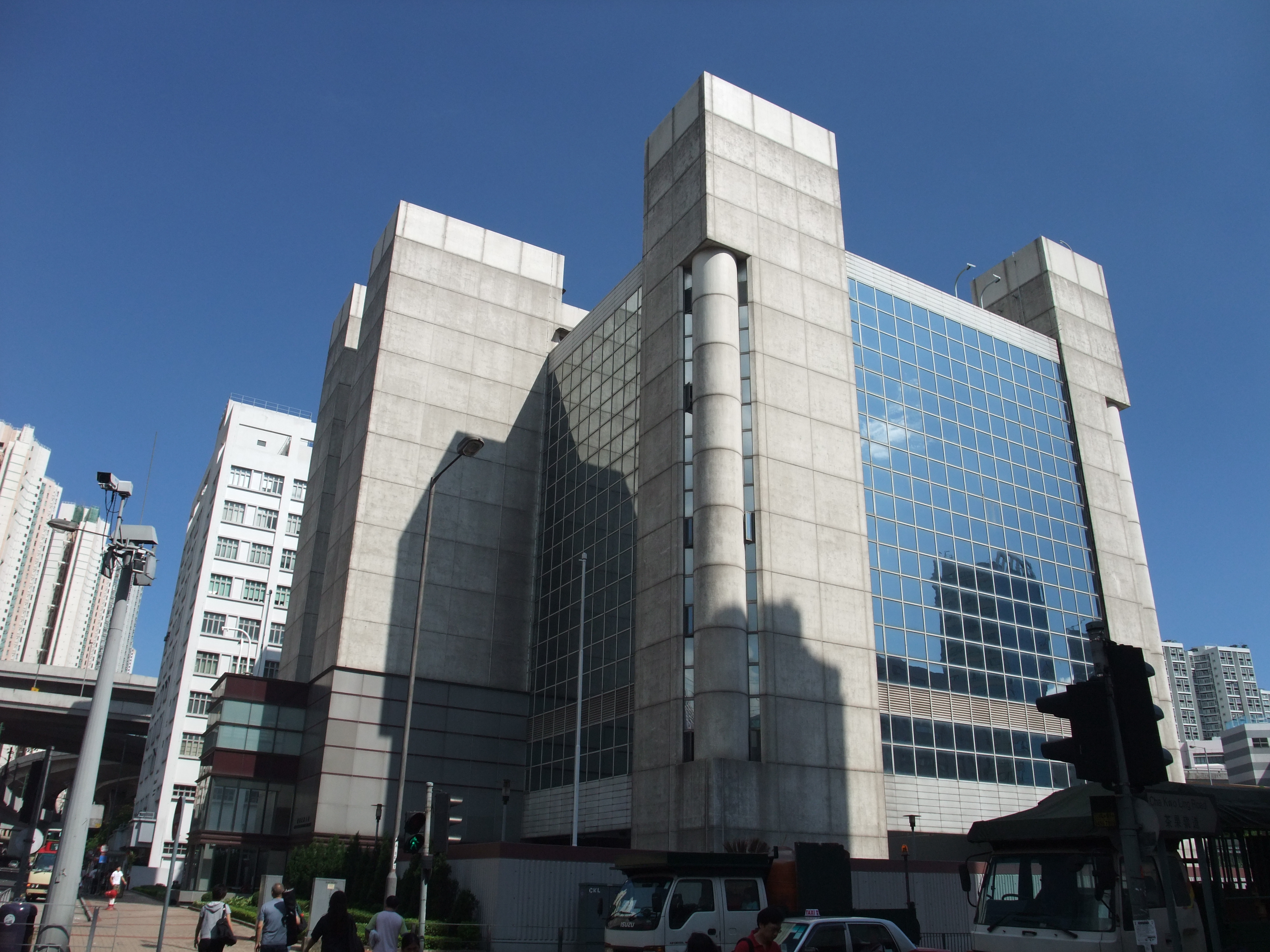
- Kwun Tong Magistrates' Court
- Location: Hong Kong
- Authorised by: Hong Kong Basic Law, Magistrates Ordinance (Cap. 227)
- Appeals to: Court of First Instance of the High Court; further appeal to the Court of Final Appeal in limited circumstances
- Website: judiciary.hk

Chief Magistrate
- Currently: Mr Victor SO Wai-tak

Magistrates' court
- Chinese: 香港裁判法院
Transcriptions
Standard Mandarin
- Hanyu Pinyin: Xiānggǎng Cáipàn Fǎyuàn
Yue: Cantonese
- Jyutping: hoeng1 gong2 coi4 pun3 faat3 jyun6*2

The magistrates' courts (in case citations, HKMagC) are the lowest tier of criminal courts in Hong Kong. They have criminal jurisdiction over a wide range of offences, and in general these offences must only constitute two years' imprisonment or a fine of HK$100,000; in certain circumstances, sentences of three years may be imposed. Their jurisdiction and sentencing powers are set out in the Magistrates Ordinance (Cap. 227).

The hierarchy of the Hong Kong judiciary from high to low is: the Court of Final Appeal, the High Court (consisting of the upper Court of Appeal and the lower Court of First Instance), the District Court, and magistrates' courts.

All criminal proceedings must begin in the magistrates' courts; the Secretary for Justice may transfer cases to either the District Court or the Court of First Instance depending on the seriousness of the crime. Summary offences can only be tried in a magistrates' court, while indictable-only and either-way offences are commonly transferred to the District Court or Court of First Instance for trial. The magistrates' courts are the busiest in Hong Kong, with a caseload of 379,547 in 2024.

Cases are always heard before a single magistrate, who must have qualified as a barrister or solicitor either in Hong Kong or in another common law jurisdiction and have had substantial professional experience. Defendants may be represented by a solicitor or barrister, and may seek advice from duty lawyers stationed in the courts.

== Parties and proceedings ==
=== Defence lawyers ===
Legal aid is not available for proceedings in the magistrates' courts; instead, the publicly-funded Duty Lawyer Service provides legal representation by qualified lawyers in private practice for eligible defendants.

Barristers and solicitors have equal rights of audience before the magistrates' courts. As such, solicitors can be commonly found performing advocacy duties where a barrister would otherwise be instructed.

Lawyers appearing in the magistrates' courts do not have to wear court dress, and typically appear in business attire.

=== Prosecutors ===
Cases in the magistrates' courts are prosecuted by government counsel, barristers or solicitors in private practice prosecuting on fiat, or lay "court prosecutors", who are not required to be legally qualified.

The magistrates' courts are the only courts in Hong Kong that involve the participation of lay prosecutors, known as court prosecutors, who prosecute the majority of cases in these courts. Court prosecutors were introduced in 1976 to take over the role of police inspectors in prosecuting cases before the magistrates. While court prosecutors are not required to have legal qualifications, a small number do, and all court prosecutors are required to undergo a 9-month training programme on advocacy skills, the rules of evidence, substantive law, and prosecutorial ethics. As of 2015, there were 80 court prosecutors, 31 of which had obtained a PCLL or LLB equivalent, and 6 of which were fully qualified solicitors or barristers.

== Magistrates ==
=== Appointment and retirement ===
Magistrates are judicial officers appointed by the Chief Executive on the recommendation of the Judicial Officers Recommendation Commission. Since 2019, the retirement age for magistrates is 65.

=== Status, style and dress ===
Magistrates are not judges; only those sitting in the District Court or above are known as judges. Magistrates may be addressed as your Worship, and typically wear a closed black gown, a wing collar, and bands while sitting in court. Magistrates do not wear wigs in court.

=== Types of magistrates ===
==== Chief Magistrate ====
The Chief Magistrate is the court leader and is responsible for the overall administration of the magistrates' courts.

==== Principal magistrate ====
A principal magistrate is in charge of one of the seven magistrates' courts.

==== Permanent magistrate ====
A permanent magistrate is a full-time magistrate, and is assigned to sit in one of the seven magistrates' courts.

The Chief Justice appoints on a temporary basis a number of principal and permanent magistrates to sit as a Master in the High Court or to sit as a Deputy District Judge or Master in the District Court, Family Court or Lands Tribunal. The Chief Justice also appoints a number of permanent magistrates to sit as Presiding Officers in the Labour Tribunal and Adjudicators in the Small Claims Tribunal.

==== Special magistrate ====
A special magistrate is also a full-time magistrate, but is assigned to deal with various kinds of departmental summons including minor offences such as traffic contraventions. Their sentencing power is limited to a maximum fine of HK$50,000 or as specified in their warrants of appointment.

In sections 57 and 91 of the Magistrates Ordinance (Cap. 227), special magistrates are given the authority to impose a sentence of up to 6 months for one offence and up to 12 months for more than one. In practice however, there will always be a term in the special magistrates' warrants of appointment stipulating that they "shall not have power to impose any sentence of imprisonment". Therefore, special magistrates while in theory are permitted to impose sentences are in practice unable to.

==== Deputy magistrate / deputy special magistrate ====
A deputy magistrate or deputy special magistrate is assigned by the Chief Justice for such period and on such terms as the chief justice thinks fit. This makes additional manpower available to the magistrates' courts while also giving eligible persons experience on the bench, before the magistrate commits to a full-time posting or returns to private practice.

== List of magistrates ==
=== Chief Magistrate ===
- Mr SO Wai-tak, Victor

=== Principal magistrates ===
- Mr LUI Kin-man, Simon (Note: Previously sat as District Court Registrar, a Deputy District Judge and Presiding Officer of the Lands Tribunal.)
- Miss YIM Shun-yee, Ada (Note: Sitting as a Deputy District Judge until 9 June 2023. Previously sat as a Coroner.)
- Mr SO Man-lung, Don (Note: Previously sat as a Deputy District Judge)
- Miss CHUI Yee-mei, Ivy (Note: Previously sat as a Deputy District Judge)

=== Permanent magistrates ===
The current permanent magistrates (as at 1 January 2023) are (ranked according to seniority):

- Mr MAK Kwok-cheung, Brian (Note: Sitting as a District Court Master until 30 June 2023. Previously sat as a Deputy District Judge.)
- Mr CHEANG Kei-hong (Note: Previously sat as a High Court Master and as a Deputy District Judge.)
- Mr WONG Kwok-fai, Raymond (Note: Previously sat as a Deputy District Judge)
- Ms CHAN Wai-mun, Amy (Note: Sitting as a Deputy District Judge until 30 June 2023. Previously sat as a Coroner.)
- Miss CHOW Pok-fun, Josephine (Note: Sitting as a Deputy District Judge in the Family Court until 11 August 2023)
- Mr YIP Sue-pui, Lawrence (Note: Sitting as a Deputy District Judge until 12 May 2023. Previously sat as Principal Adjudicator (Acting) of the Small Claims Tribunal.)
- Mr WAN Siu-ming, Jason (Note: Previously sat as a Deputy District Judge)
- Mr LI Chi-ho (Note: Previously sat as a Deputy District Judge)
- Ms WONG Susan (Note: Previously sat as a Deputy District Judge in the Family Court)
- Ms LAU Yee-wan, Winnie (Note: Sitting as a Deputy District Judge until 3 February 2023)
- Mr TANG Siu-hung, Daniel (Note: Sitting as a Deputy District Judge until 4 March 2023)
- Mr CHEUNG Chi-wai, David (Note: Sitting as a Deputy District Judge until 30 June 2023)
- Mr CHENG Lim-chi, Andy (Note: Previously sat as a Deputy District Judge)
- Ms LAM Mei-sze, Michelle (Note: Sitting as Deputy District Judge until 1 September 2023. Previously sat as Principal Presiding Officer (Acting) of the Labour Tribunal and as a Deputy District Judge in the Family Court.)
- Mr CHUM Yau-fong, David
- Mr SHUM Kei-leong, Timon (Note: Sitting as a Labour Tribunal Presiding Officer. Previously sat as a Deputy District Judge.)
- Mr KO Wai-hung, David (Note: Previously sat as a Deputy District Judge)
- Miss HO Wai-yang (Note: Sitting as a Deputy District Judge in the Family Court until 13 May 2023. Previously sat as a Deputy District Judge and Presiding Officer of the Lands Tribunal and as a District Court Master.)
- Ms CHEUNG Tin-ngan, June (Note: Sitting as a Deputy District Judge until 9 June 2023. Previously sat as a District Court Master.)
- Miss NG Chung-yee, Debbie
- Ms HEUNG Shuk-han, Veronica (Note: Previously sat as a Deputy District Judge)
- Ms TO Kit-ling, Doris (Note: Sitting as a High Court Master until 20 March 2023. Previously sat as a Deputy District Judge in the Family Court.)
- Ms SHUI Kelly
- Ms CHENG Kam-lin, Catherine (Note: Previously sat as a District Court Master)
- Mr CHAN Ping-chau, Kenneth
- Mr LEE Siu-ho (Note: Sitting as a Deputy District Judge and Presiding Officer of the Lands Tribunal until 5 May 2023. Previously sat as a High Court Master and as a District Court Master.)
- Mr CHOW Chi-wei, Raymund (Note: Previously sat as a Deputy District Judge in the Family Court and as a Coroner.)
- Ms CHU Yuen-yee, Isabella (Note: Sitting as a District Court Master until 17 March 2023. Previously sat as a Small Claims Tribunal Adjudicator)
- Mr CHAN David (Note: Sitting as a High Court Master until 16 July 2023. Previously sat as Principal Presiding Officer of the Labour Tribunal and as a Deputy District Judge.)
- Ms WONG Nga-yan, Peony (Note: Previously sat as a Deputy District Judge)
- Mr WONG Sze-cheung, Colin (Note: Previously sat as a Deputy District Judge)
- Ms SO Ka-yin, Rita (Note: Sitting as a High Court Master until 15 May 2023. Previously sat as a Deputy District Judge in the Family Court and as a District Court Master.)
- Miss LEE Kar-lok, Jacqueline (Note: Sitting as a Deputy District Judge in the Family Court until 15 September 2023. Previously sat as a District Court Master.)
- Mr HO Chun-yiu, Stanley (Note: Sitting as a Coroner. Previously sat as a High Court Master and a Deputy District Judge.)
- Ms SOONG Wing-sum, Michelle (Note: Sitting as District Court Registrar until 12 May 2023. Previously sat as a Deputy District Judge and Presiding Officer of the Lands Tribunal.)
- Ms LEUNG Ka-kie (Note: Sitting as a Deputy District Judge until 31 March 2023)
- Ms TSUI May-har, Stephanie (Note: Sitting as a Deputy District Judge until 30 June 2023. Previously sat as a Coroner.)
- Ms LEUNG Siu-ling, Jocelyn (Note: Sitting as a Deputy District Judge until 2 June 2023. Previously sat as a District Court Master.)
- Mr IP Kai-leung, Jacky (Note: Previously sat as a Deputy District Judge)
- Mr PANG Leung-ting (Note: Sitting as Deputy District Judge until 8 September 2023.)
- Ms CHUNG Ming-sun, May (Note: Sitting as a High Court Master until 27 September 2023.)
- Miss CHAN Lo-yee, Louise (Note: Sitting as a Deputy District Judge until 30 June 2023. Previously sat as a District Court Master.)
- Mr WONG Ching-yu, Edward
- Mr LAM Tsz-kan, Gary
- Mr LEUNG Man-liang, Matthew (Note: Sitting as a High Court Master until 30 November 2023. Previously sat as a District Court Master.)
- Miss LAU Suk-han
- Mr MOK Tze-chung, Andrew
- Miss LEUNG Nga-yan, Frances
- Mr LAM Hei-wei, Arthur
- Ms CHOW Wai-choo, Monica (Note: Sitting as a Coroner)
- Ms CHAK Kwok-yee, Anny (Note: Sitting as a District Court Master until 22 September 2023. Previously sat as a Small Claims Tribunal Adjudicator.)
- Mr LAM Chak-ming, Maurice (Note: Sitting as a District Court Master until 22 April 2023)
- Ms YEUNG Yee-na, Eleanor (Note: Sitting as a District Court Master until 2 June 2023. Previously sat as a Labour Tribunal Presiding Officer.)
- Miss SIU Chi-wan, Jo (Note: Sitting as a Labour Tribunal Presiding Officer)
- Mr LUNG Gwun-ting, Bryan (Note: Sitting as a District Court Master until 9 June 2023. Previously sat as a Small Claims Tribunal Adjudicator.)
- Miss WAT Lai-man, Minnie
- Mr YU Chun-cheung, Peter
- Mr SZE Cho-yiu, Jeffrey (Note: Sitting as a Small Claims Tribunal Adjudicator)
- Mr PUN Wang-hon, Dominic (Note: Sitting as a District Court Master until 28 April 2023. Previously sat as a Labour Tribunal Presiding Officer.)
- Miss LO Hong-wai, Charmaine
- Miss HO Wai-han, Vivian
- Mr CHAN Chee-fai, Philip
- Mr TSANG Chung-yiu
- Miss LEE Wai-wan, Vivian
- Mr TSANG Hing-tung
- Mr CHU Man-hon, Gary
- Mr LI Ngai, Ross

== List of chief magistrates since 1997 ==
No.	Name	Tenure start	Tenure end	Tenure length	Reason for tenure end	Later most senior judicial role
1	Louis Tong Po-sun	2 March 1998	2 October 2000	2 years and 215 days	Appointed Judge of the Court of First Instance	Same (retired)
2	Patrick Li Hon-leung	3 October 2000	1 February 2007	6 years and 122 days	Appointed District Court Judge	Judge of the Court of First Instance (retired)
3	Tong Man	2 July 2008	15 September 2013	6 years and 122 days	Retired	None (retired)
4	Clement Lee Hing-nin	11 March 2014	2 January 2018	3 years and 298 days	Appointed District Court Judge	Same
5	Victor So Wai-tak	6 January 2020	Incumbent	6 years and 96 days		

== List of magistrates' courts ==
=== Existing magistrates' courts ===
Court	Opened	Address	Jurisdiction
Eastern	28 January 1991	Eastern Law Courts Building, 29 Tai On Street, Sai Wan Ho	Hong Kong Island, Islands District (except Lantau Island)
West Kowloon	28 December 2016	West Kowloon Law Courts Building, 501 Tung Chau Street, Cheung Sha Wan	Sham Shui Po, Mong Kok, Kwai Tsing, Tsuen Wan, Lantau Island
Kowloon City	3 July 2001	Kowloon City Law Courts Building, 147M Argyle Street, Kowloon City	Kowloon City, Yau Ma Tei, Tsim Sha Tsui, Wong Tai Sin
Kwun Tong	1980	Kwun Tong Law Courts Building, 10 Lei Yue Mun Road	Kwun Tong, Wong Tai Sin, Sai Kung, Tseung Kwan O
Tuen Mun	24 September 1987	Tuen Mun Law Courts Building, 1 Tuen Hi Road, Tuen Mun	Tuen Mun, Yuen Long
Fanling	2 July 2002	Fanling Law Courts Building, 1 Pik Fung Road, Fanling	Tai Po, North District
Sha Tin	1987	Shatin Law Courts Building, 1 Yi Ching Lane, Sha Tin	Sha Tin, Ma On Shan

Existing magistrates' courts

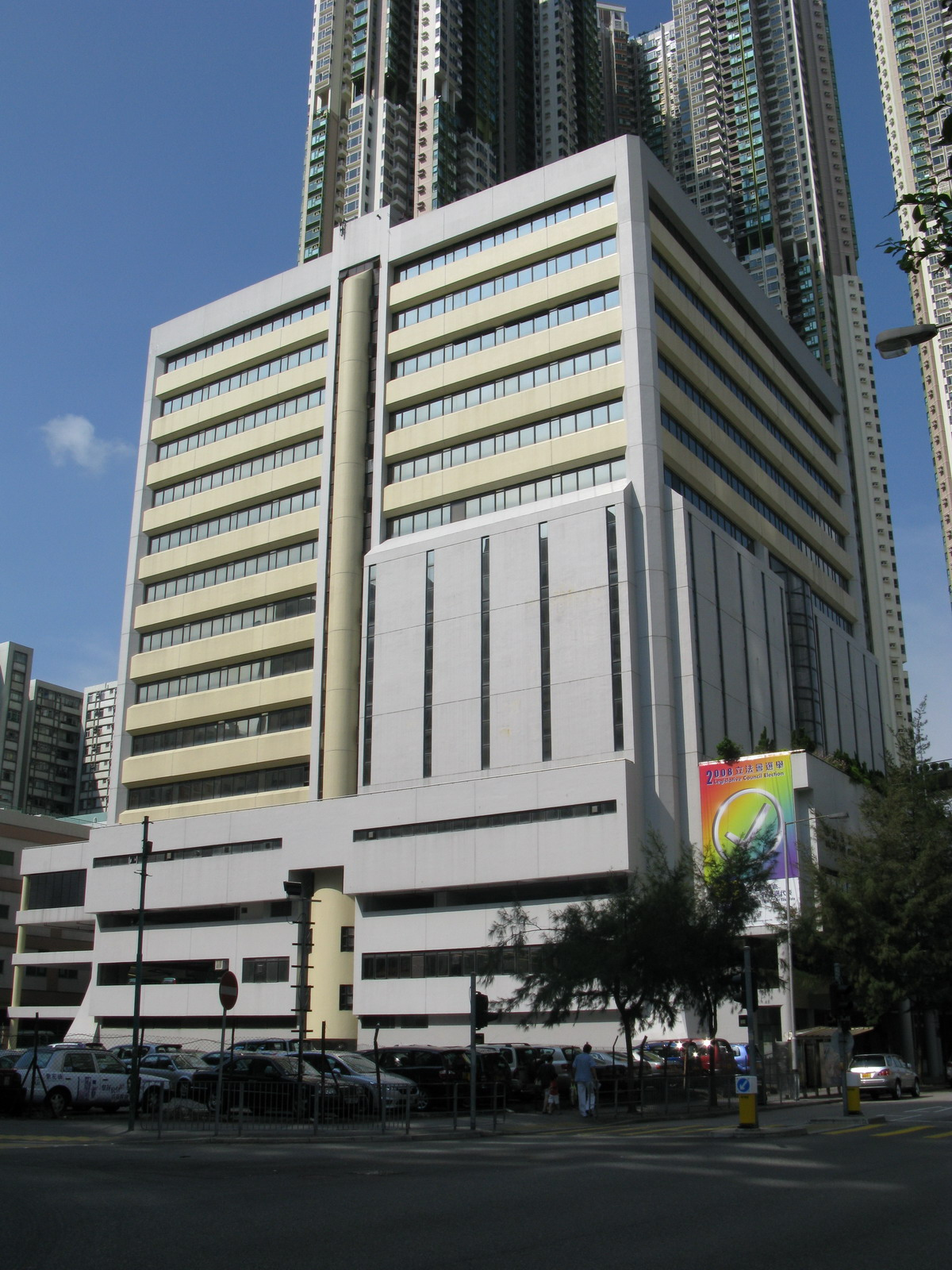
Eastern

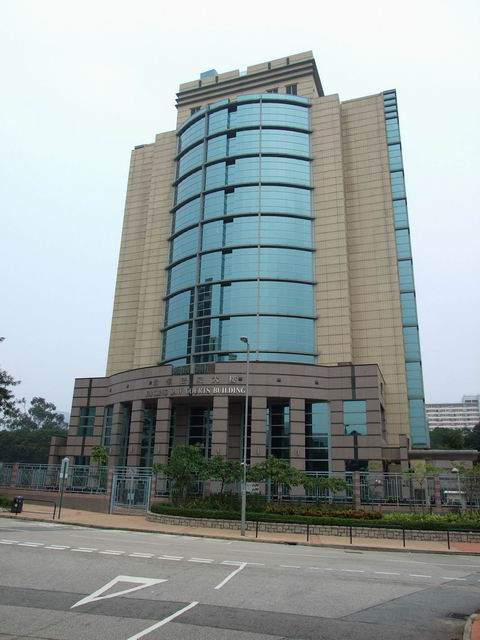
Fanling

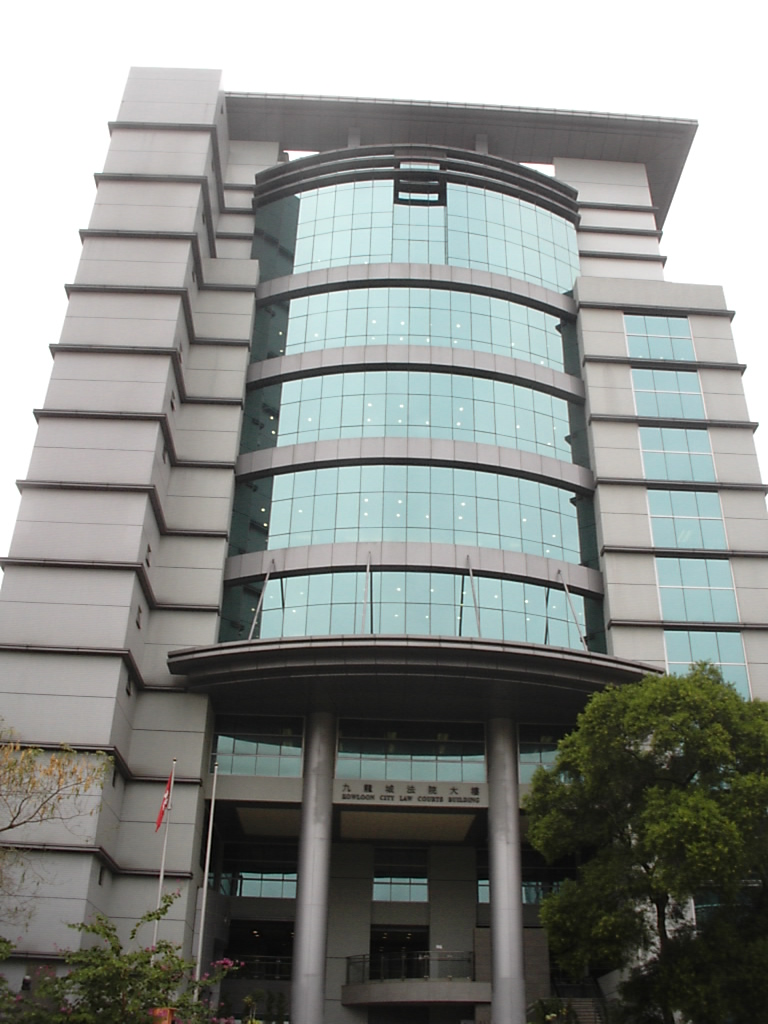
Kowloon City

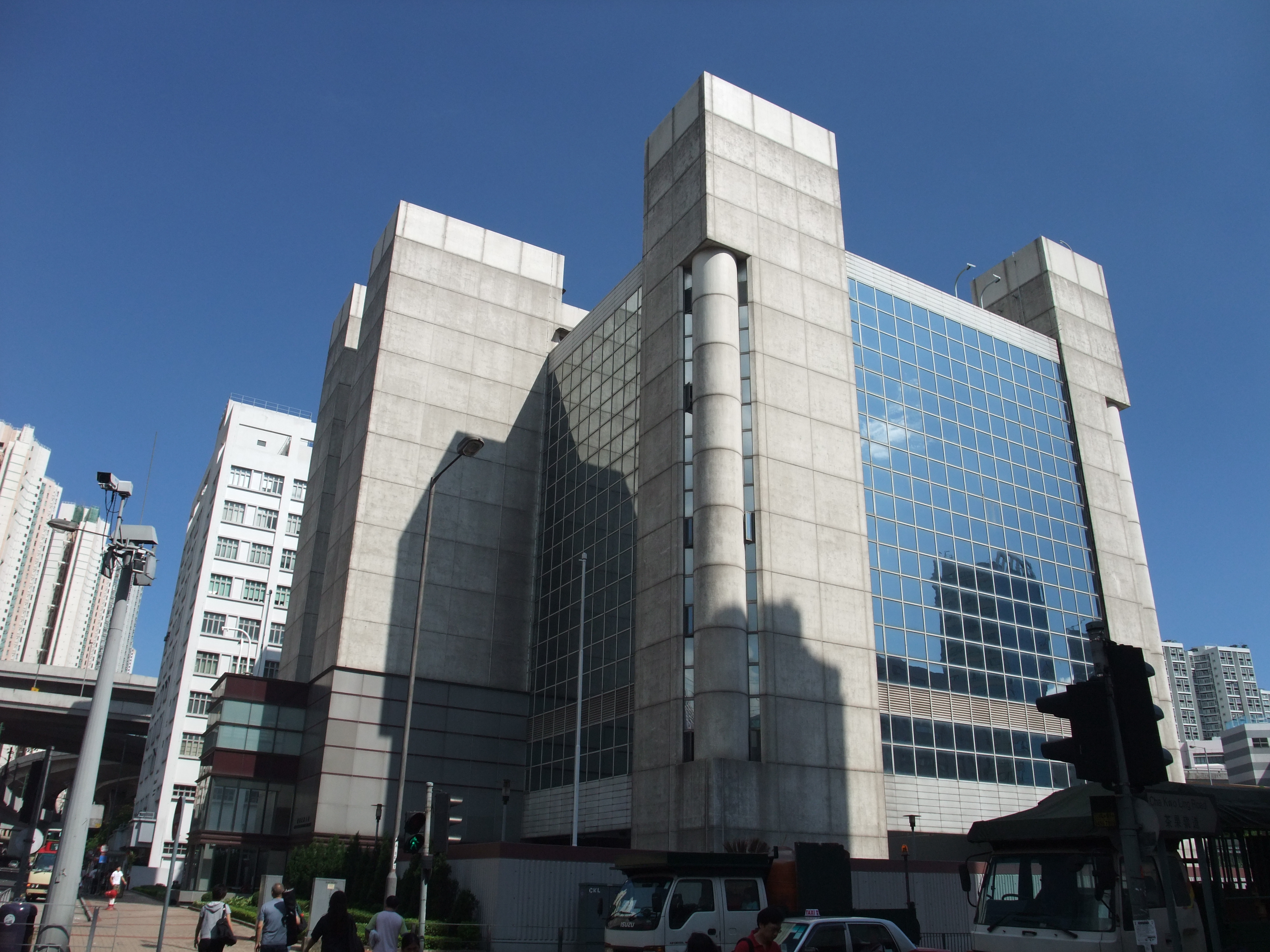
Kwun Tong

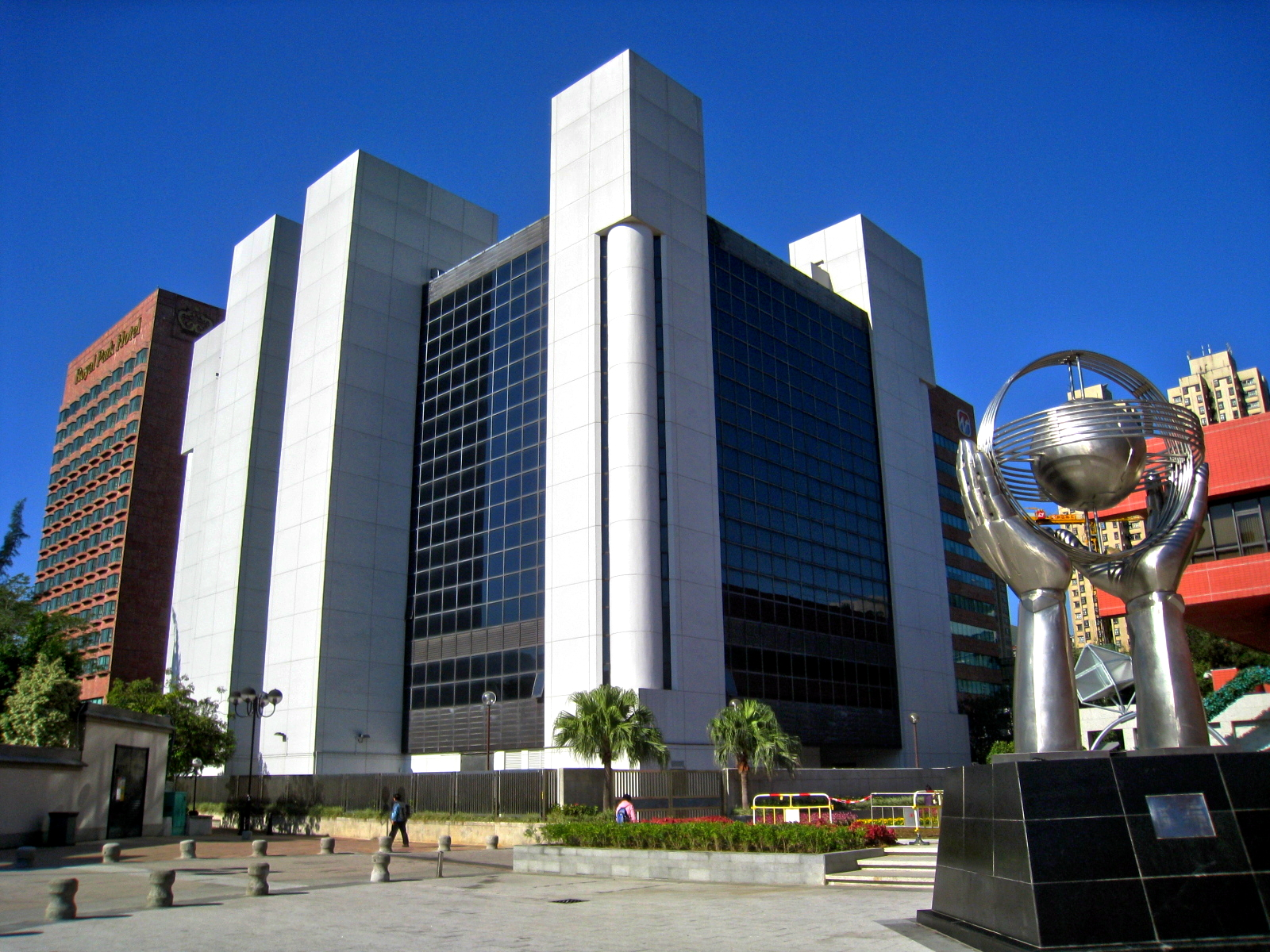
Sha Tin

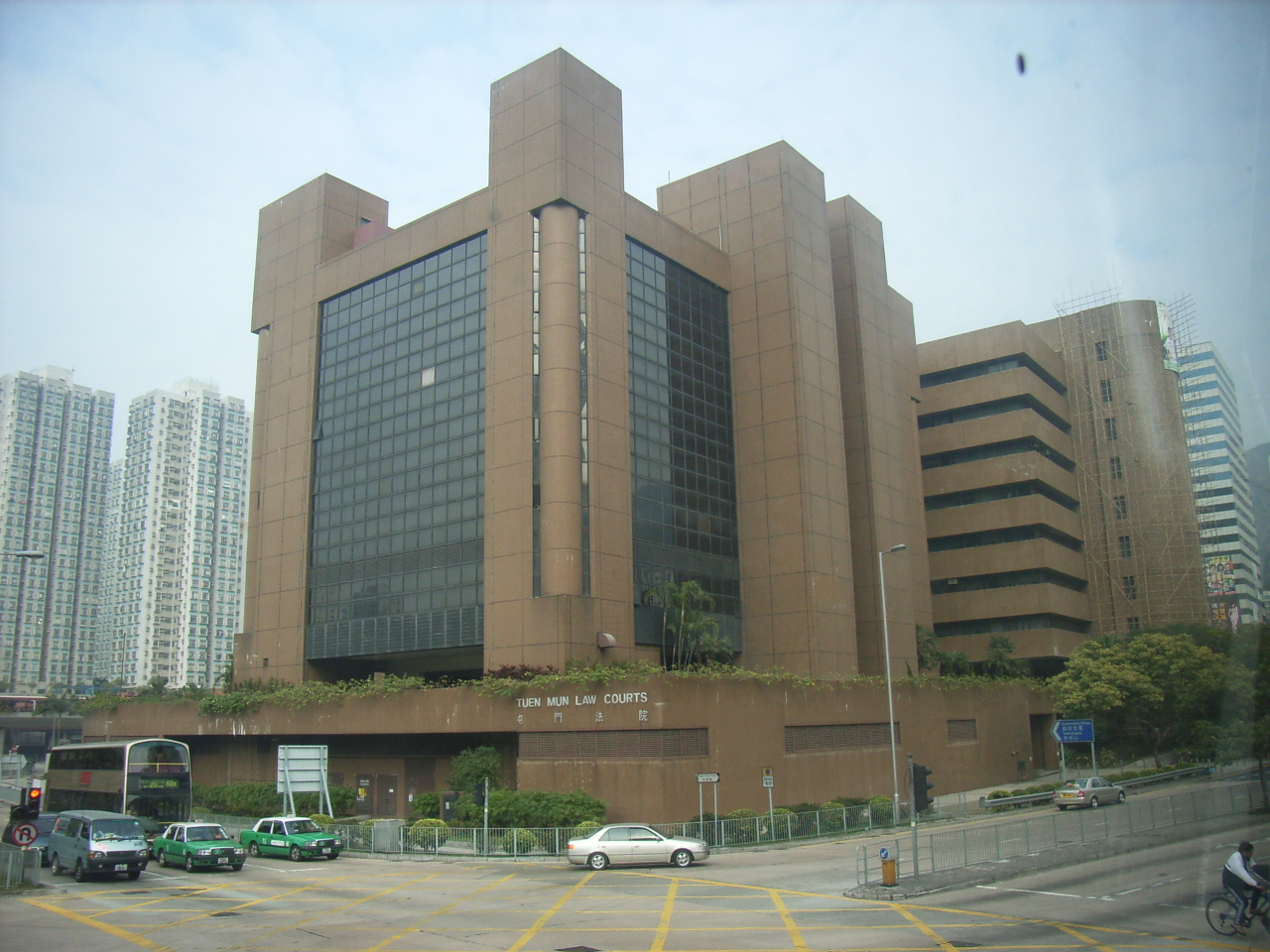
Tuen Mun

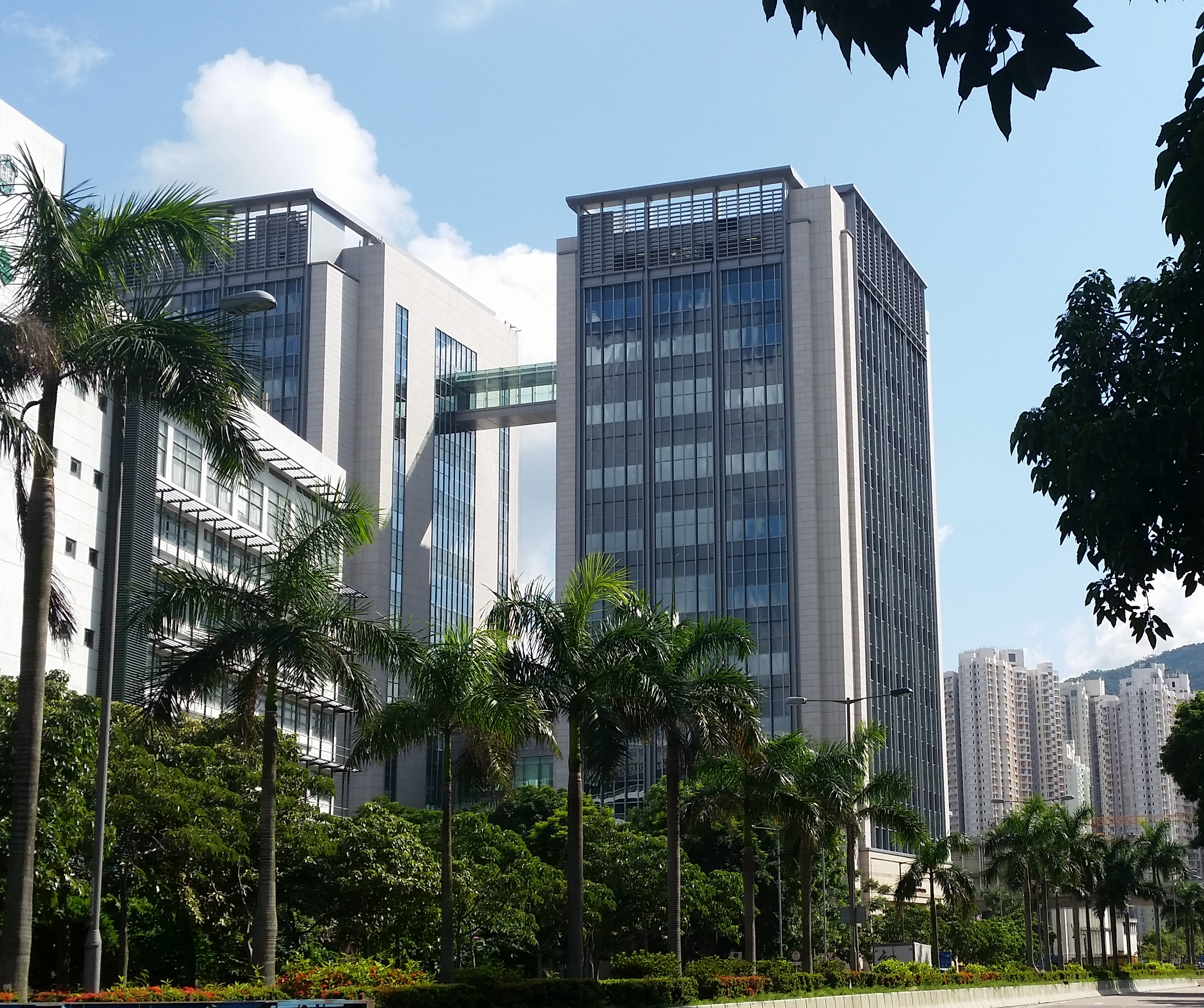
West Kowloon

=== Former magistrates' courts ===
Court	Opened	Closed	Address	Subsequent use
Central Magistracy		1979	1 Arbuthnot Road, Central	Supreme Court, Immigration Department, Central Police Station, now part of Tai Kwun complex
Causeway Bay Magistracy	1960	1986	20 Electric Road, Causeway Bay	Demolished — now part of Tin Hau MTR station and Park Towers
Western Magistracy		2004	2A Pok Ful Lam Road, Sai Ying Pun	Labour Department, Drainage Services Department
South Kowloon Magistrates' Court	1936	1 July 2000	36-38 Gascoigne Road, Yau Ma Tei	Labour Tribunal, Lands Tribunal
North Kowloon Magistracy		2005	292 Tai Po Road, Shek Kip Mei	Savannah College of Arts and Design (2010-2020)
San Po Kong Magistrates' Courts	26 July 1971	2001	690 Prince Edward Road East, San Po Kong	Demolished — now part of Mikiki and the Latitude
Fanling Magistracy	1961	2002	302 Jockey Club Road, Fanling	Hong Kong Federation of Youth Groups
Tsuen Wan Magistrates' Court	1971	2016	70 Tai Ho Road, Tsuen Wan	Shatin-Central Link inquiry, temporary District Court courtrooms

Former magistrates' courts

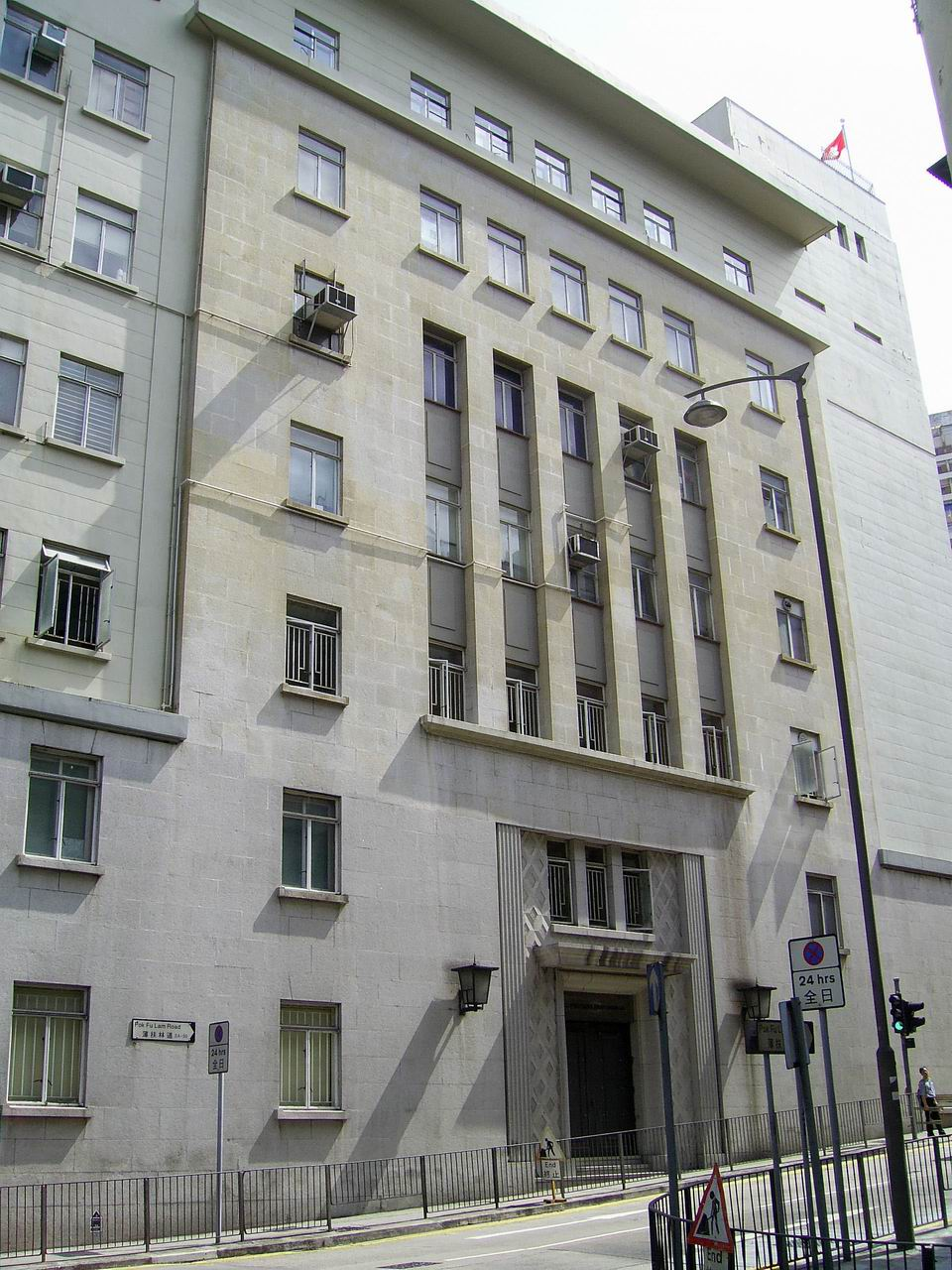
Western Magistracy

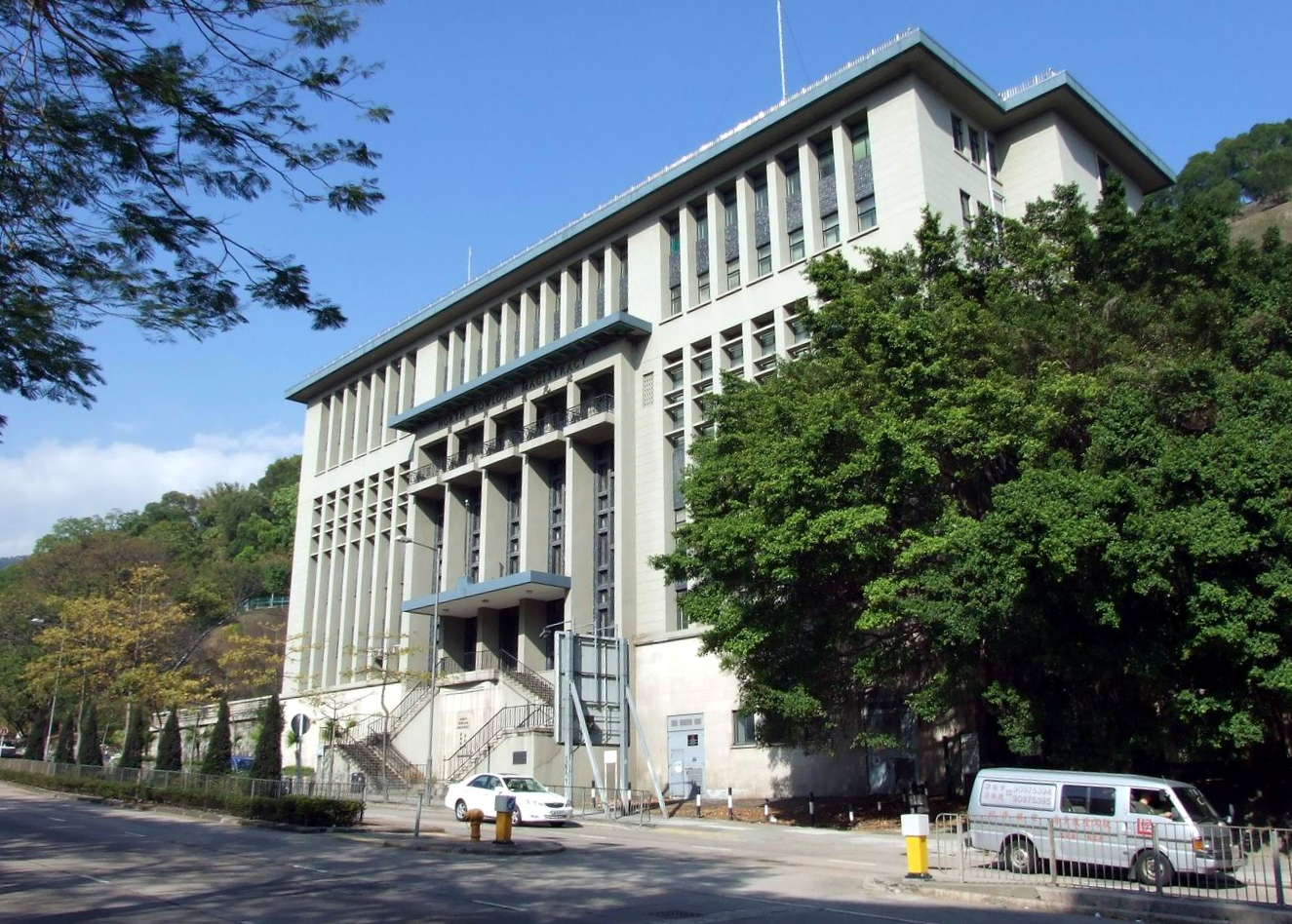
North Kowloon Magistracy

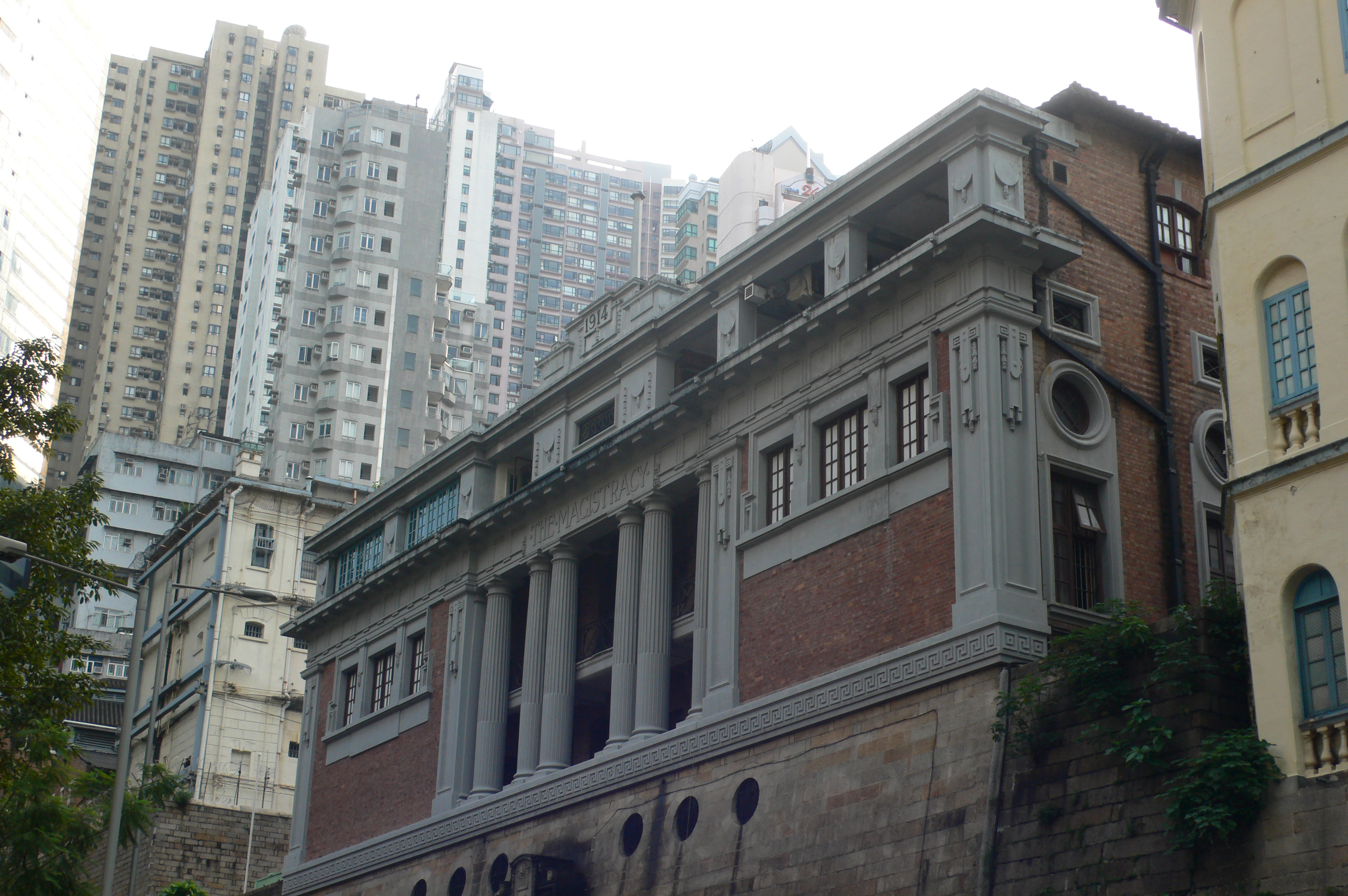
Central Magistracy

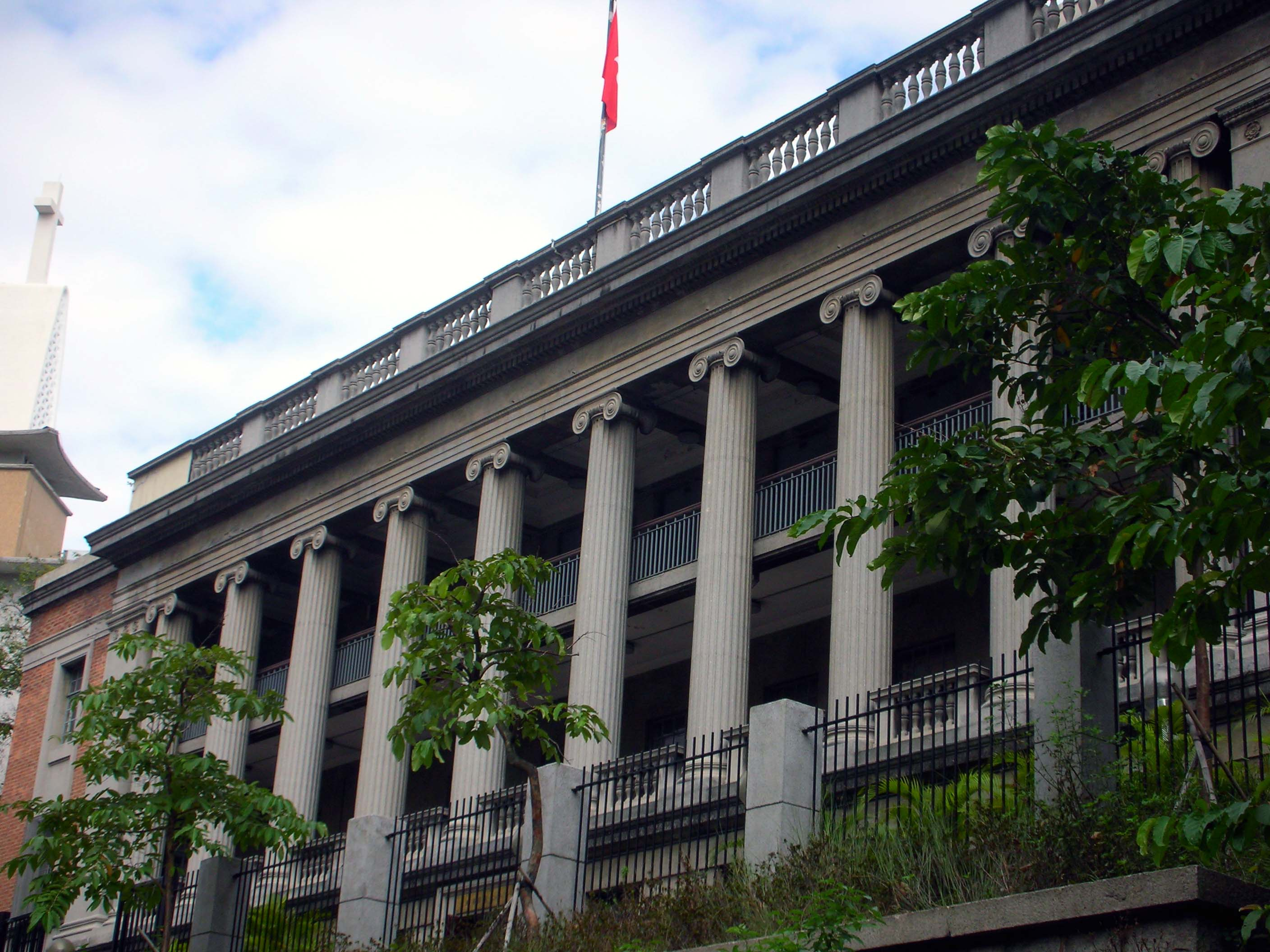
South Kowloon District Court

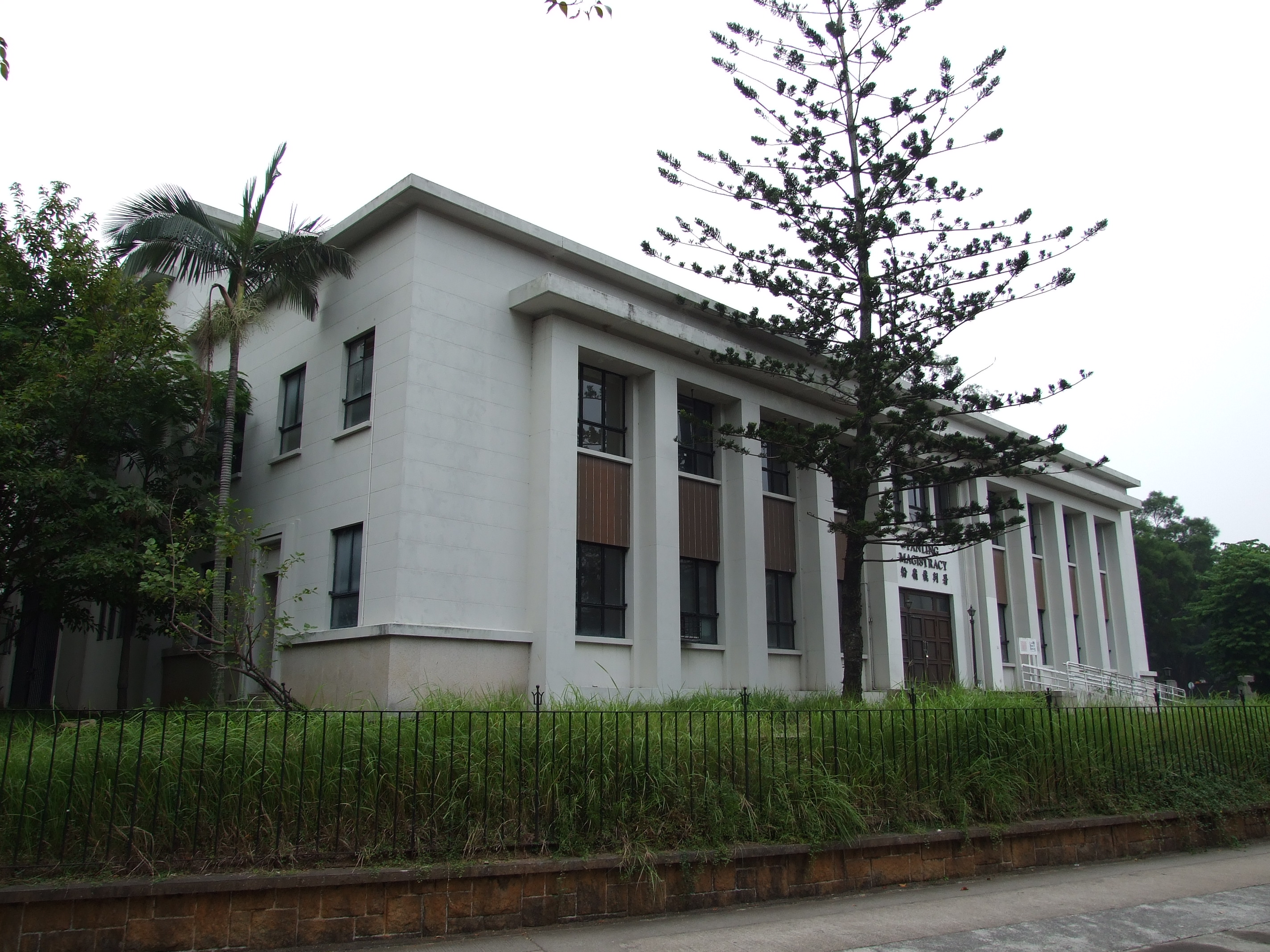
Fanling Magistracy

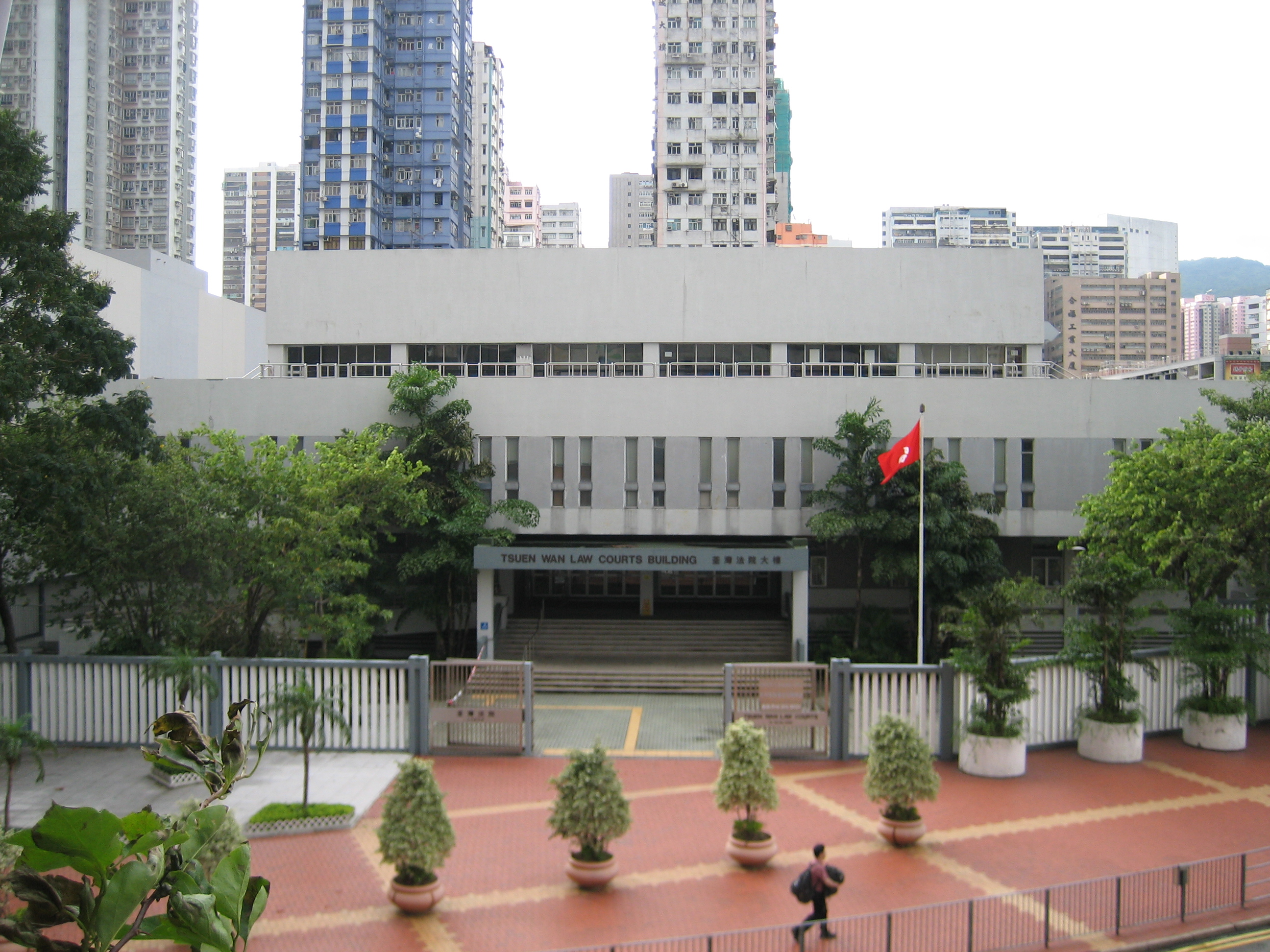
Tsuen Wan Magistrates' Court

== See also ==
- Judiciary of Hong Kong
