= Former Fanling Magistracy =

Magistrates building in Hong Kong used 1961 to 2002

Coordinates: 22.494948°N 114.140117°E

- Traditional Chinese: 前粉嶺裁判法院
Transcriptions
Yue: Cantonese
- Yale Romanization: Chìhn fán léhng chòih pun faat yún
- Jyutping: Cin4 fan2 leng5 coi4 pun3 faat3 jun2

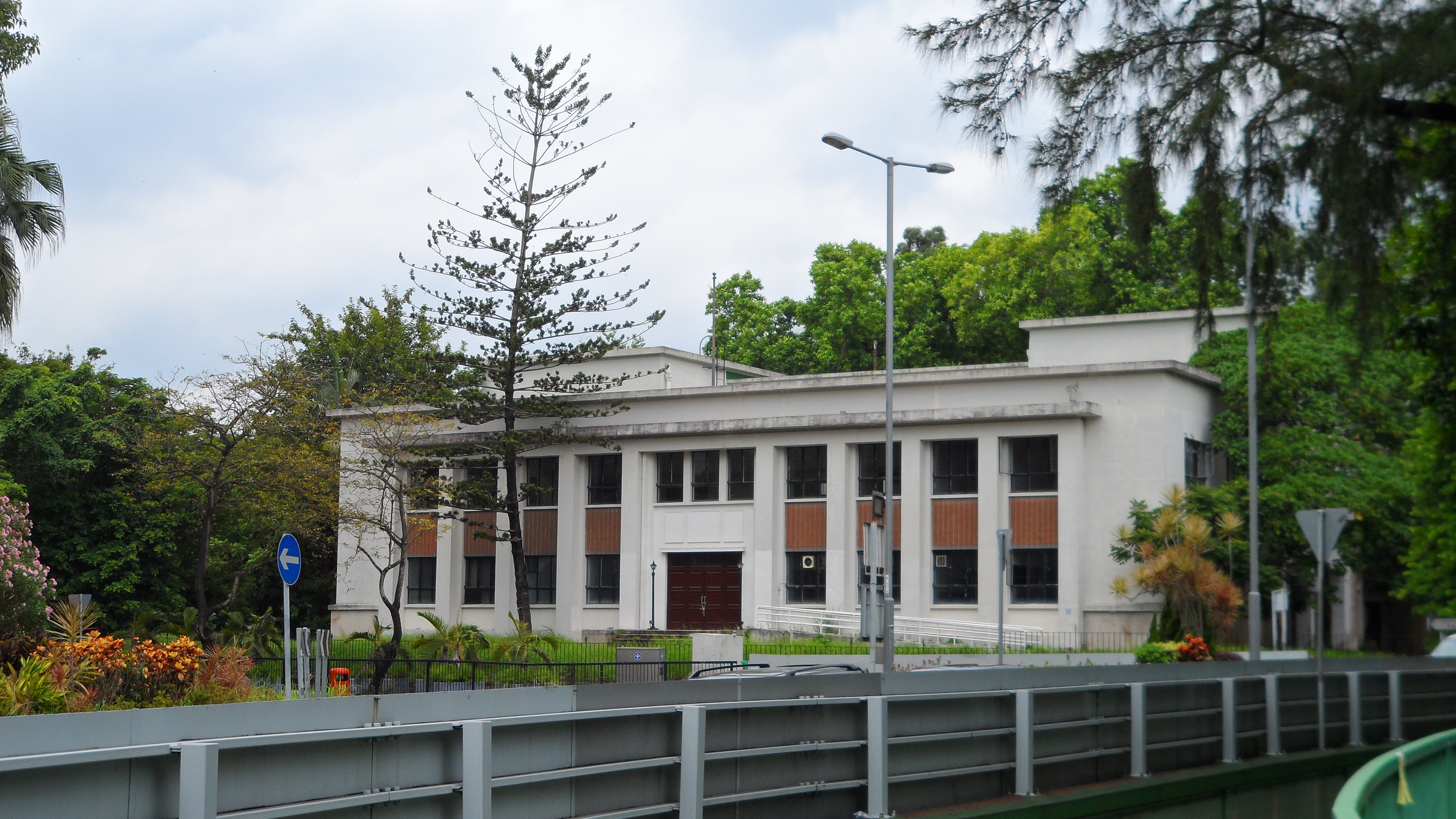
Former Fanling Magistracy

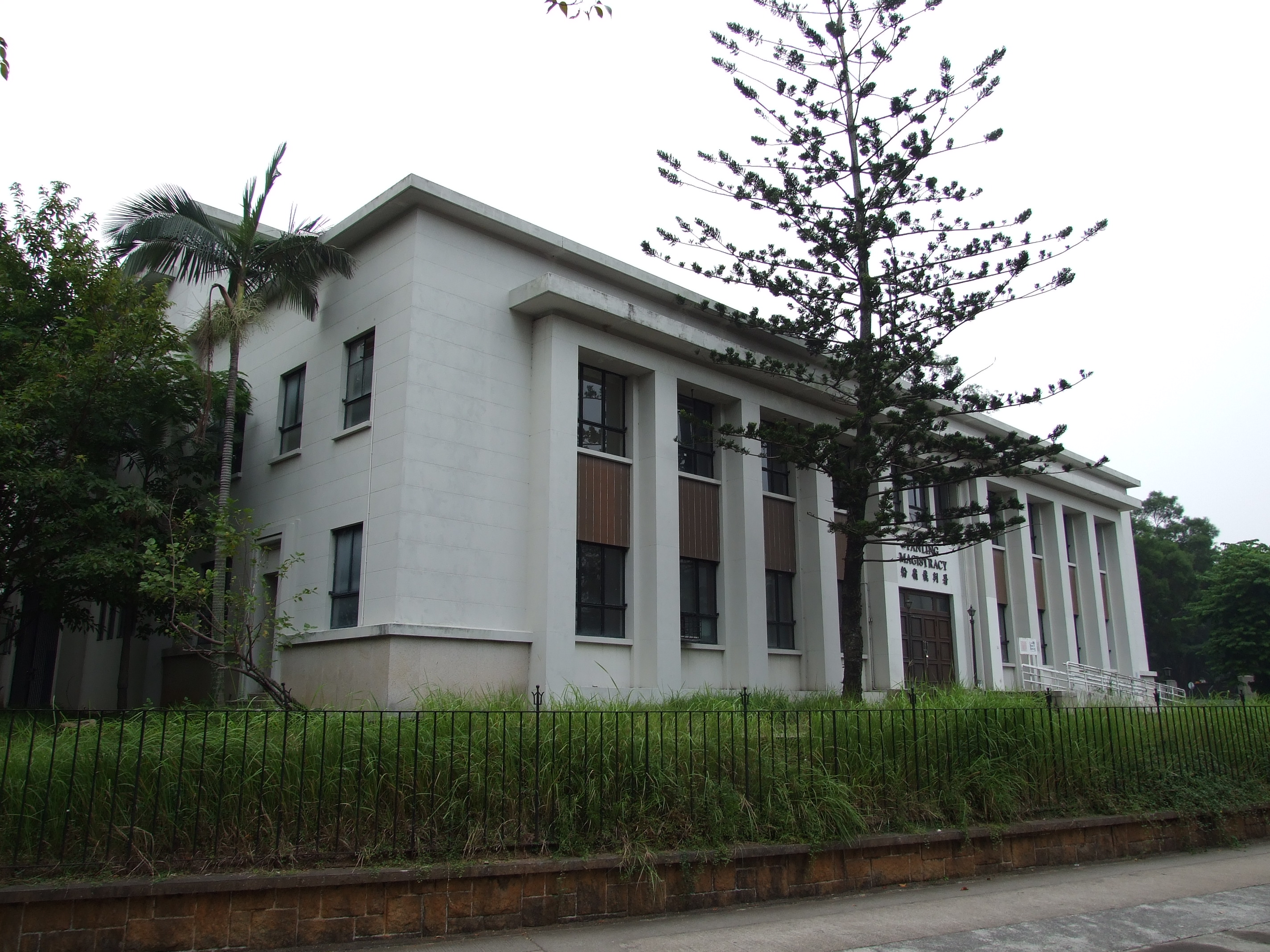
Former Fanling Magistracy

The Former Fanling Magistracy is located at No. 302 Jockey Club Road in Fanling, Hong Kong.

== History ==
The then Fanling Magistracy building was erected in 1960 and began operations in 1961. The building was closed when the magistracy moved to the Fanling Law Courts Building, opened in 2002, and has remained vacant since.

== Conservation ==
The Fanling Magistracy building was included in the Batch II and Batch III (as re-launch) of the Revitalising Historic Buildings Through Partnership Scheme. A project presented by The Hong Kong Federation of Youth Groups was selected for the adaptive reuse of the building.

== See also ==
- Magistrates' Court (Hong Kong)
- Former Central Magistracy
- Old South Kowloon District Court
- Western Magistracy
- San Po Kong Magistracy
- South Kowloon Magistracy
- North Kowloon Magistracy
