= Lands Tribunal (Hong Kong) =

Tribunal in Hong Kong

- Jurisdiction: Hong Kong
- Location: 38 Gascoigne Road, Yau Ma Tei, Kowloon
- Authorised by: Hong Kong Basic Law
- Appeals to: Court of Appeal
- Website: judiciary.hk

President
- Currently: The Hon Madam Justice Winnie Tsui

Lands Tribunal
- Traditional Chinese: 土地審裁處
Transcriptions
Yue: Cantonese
- Yale Romanization: Tóu deih sám chòih chyu
- Jyutping: Tou2 dei6 sam2 coi4 cyu6

The Lands Tribunal (in case citations, HKLdT) is a tribunal in Hong Kong that deals with legal disputes over land. It was established by the Lands Tribunal Ordinance (Cap. 17). It is situated in the former Kowloon Magistracy building. The presidency of Lands Tribunal is held by a Judge of the Court of First Instance of the High Court. Disputes not resolved at this level are taken to the Court of Appeal.

== Composition ==
The Lands Tribunal consists of professional judges: a President (who is a Judge of the Court of First Instance of the High Court) and Presiding Officers (who are District Judges or Deputy District Judges). In addition, there are Members of the Tribunal who are qualified surveyors.

The President and a Presiding Officer may either sit alone or together with a Member in hearing cases. A Member may also sit alone in hearing cases.

The composition of the Lands Tribunal (as of 1 January 2025) is:

President

- Justice Winnie Tsui

Presiding Officers

- Judge Liza Jane Cruden
- Judge Michelle Lam
- Judge Lee Siu-ho

Members

- Lawrence Pang Ho-chuen
