= North Kowloon Magistracy =

Historic building in Hong Kong

Coordinates: 22.3354°N 114.1628°E

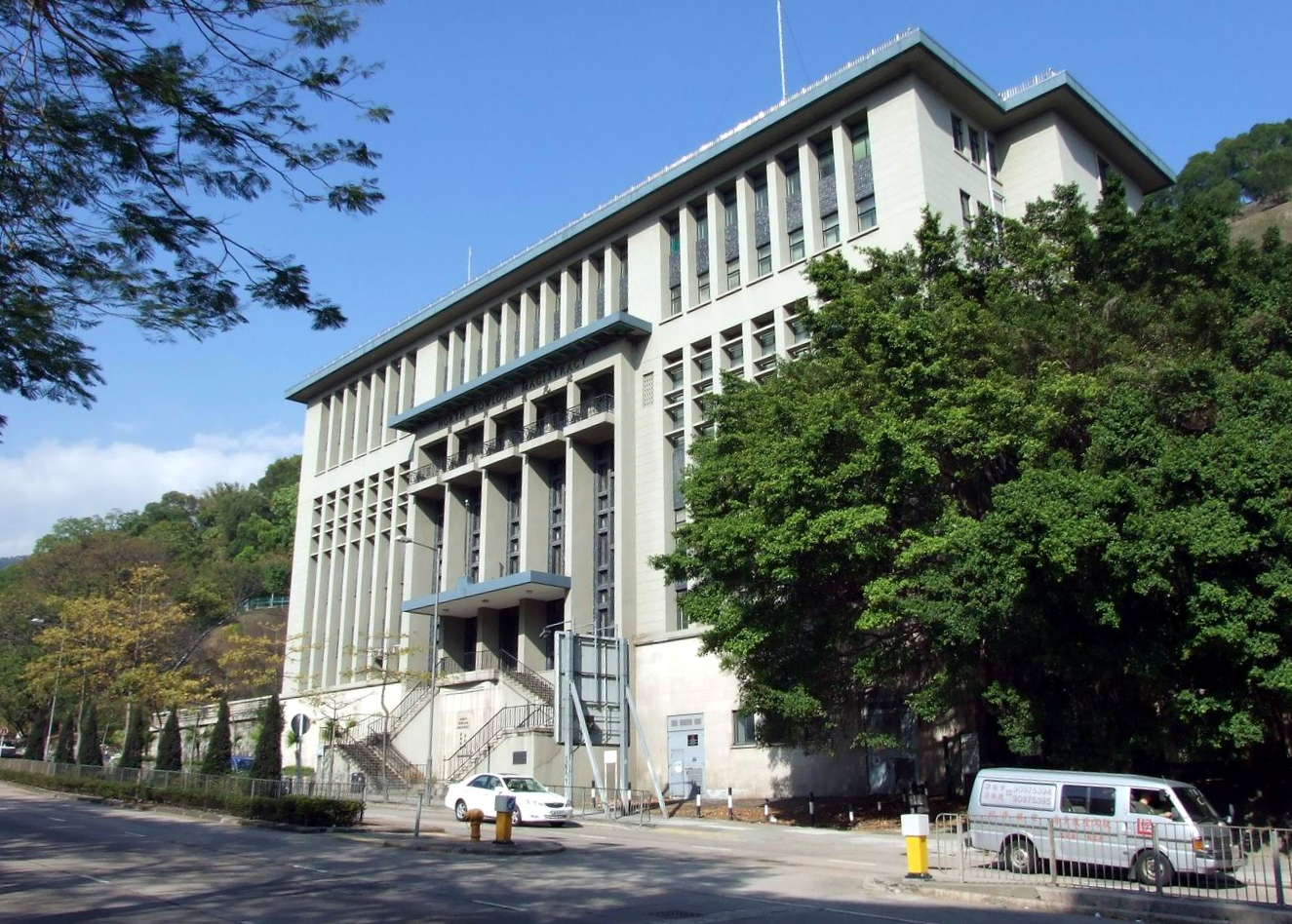
- Side View of North Kowloon Magistracy
- Interactive map of North Kowloon Magistracy
- Location: 292 Tai Po Road, Shek Kip Mei, Hong Kong
- Owner: Government of Hong Kong
- Type: Magistrate's Court

Construction
- Opened: 1960; 66 years ago
- Closed: 3 January 2005; 21 years ago

North Kowloon Magistracy
- Traditional Chinese: 北九龍裁判法院
- Simplified Chinese: 北九龙裁判法院
Transcriptions
Standard Mandarin
- Hanyu Pinyin: Běi Jiǔlóng Cáipàn Fǎyuàn
Yue: Cantonese
- Yale Romanization: Bāk gáu lùhng chòih pun faat yún
- Jyutping: Bak1 gau2 lung4 coi4 pun3 faat3 jyun2

Alternative Chinese name
- Traditional Chinese: 北九龍裁判司署
- Simplified Chinese: 北九龙裁判司署
Transcriptions
Standard Mandarin
- Hanyu Pinyin: Běi Jiǔlóng Cáipàn Sīshǔ
Yue: Cantonese
- Yale Romanization: Bāk gáu lùhng chòih pun sī chyúh
- Jyutping: Bak1 gau2 lung4 coi4 pun3 si1 cyu5

The North Kowloon Magistracy (北九龍裁判法院, 北九龍裁判司署 before 1 July 1997) is a historic building and former Magistrate's Court located at No. 292, Tai Po Road, Shek Kip Mei, Kowloon, Hong Kong.

The building was erected in 1960 and served the community for over 44 years. The Magistracy used to handle cases in the Kowloon District, which covers Mong Kok, Sham Shui Po, Shek Kip Mei, Cheung Sha Wan and Ho Man Tin, and could be considered one of the busiest in Hong Kong. It was closed in 2005 due to cost saving policy of the government and consolidation of magistracies from nine to six. In February 2009, the government declared that the building would be converted into the Hong Kong campus of the Savannah College of Art and Design (SCAD). It operated as the SCAD Hong Kong campus from September 2010 until 1 June 2020. The building ownership was returned to the government after the expiry of the tenancy on 1 August 2020.

== History ==
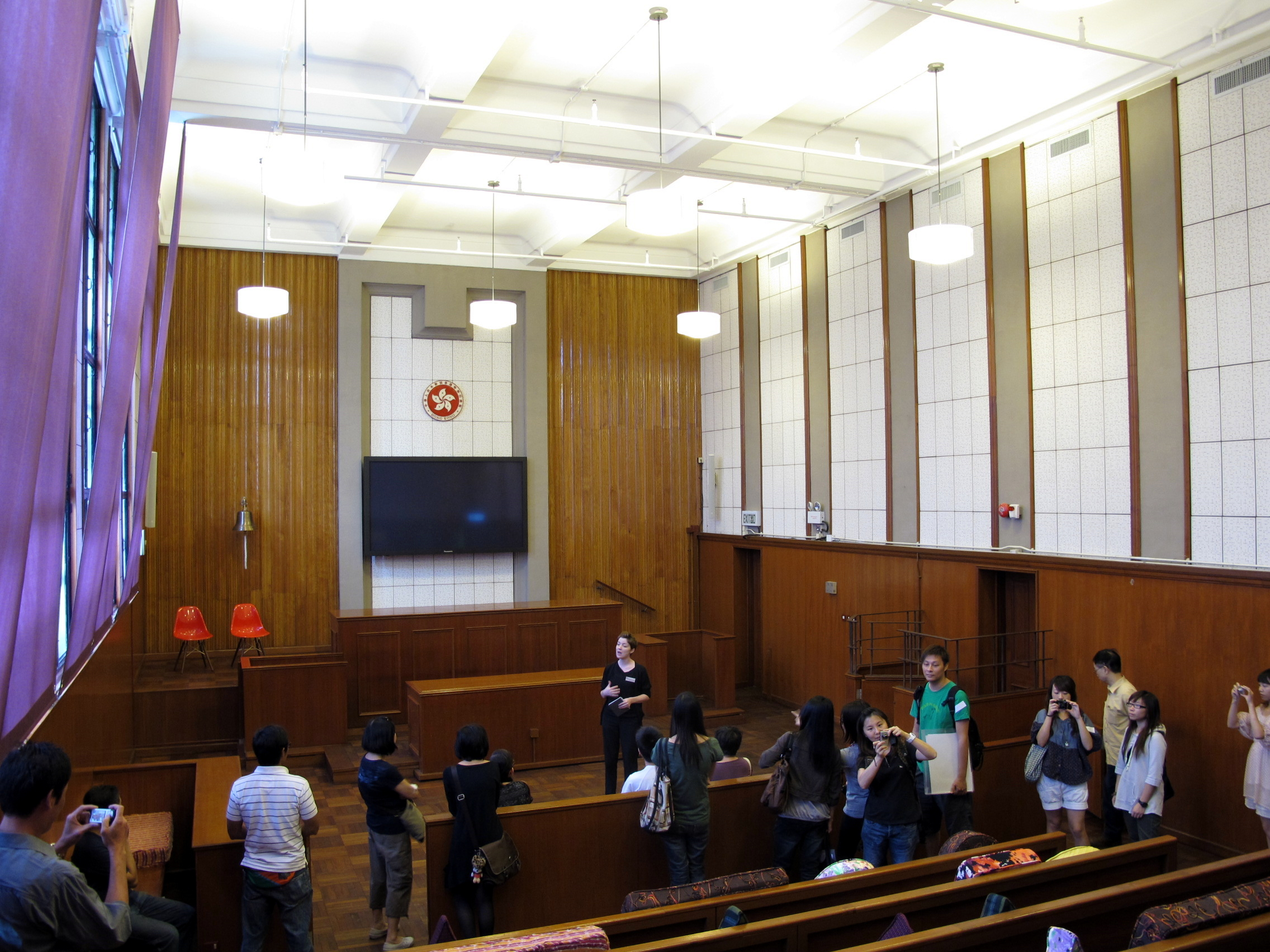
No. 1 Court inside Magistracy

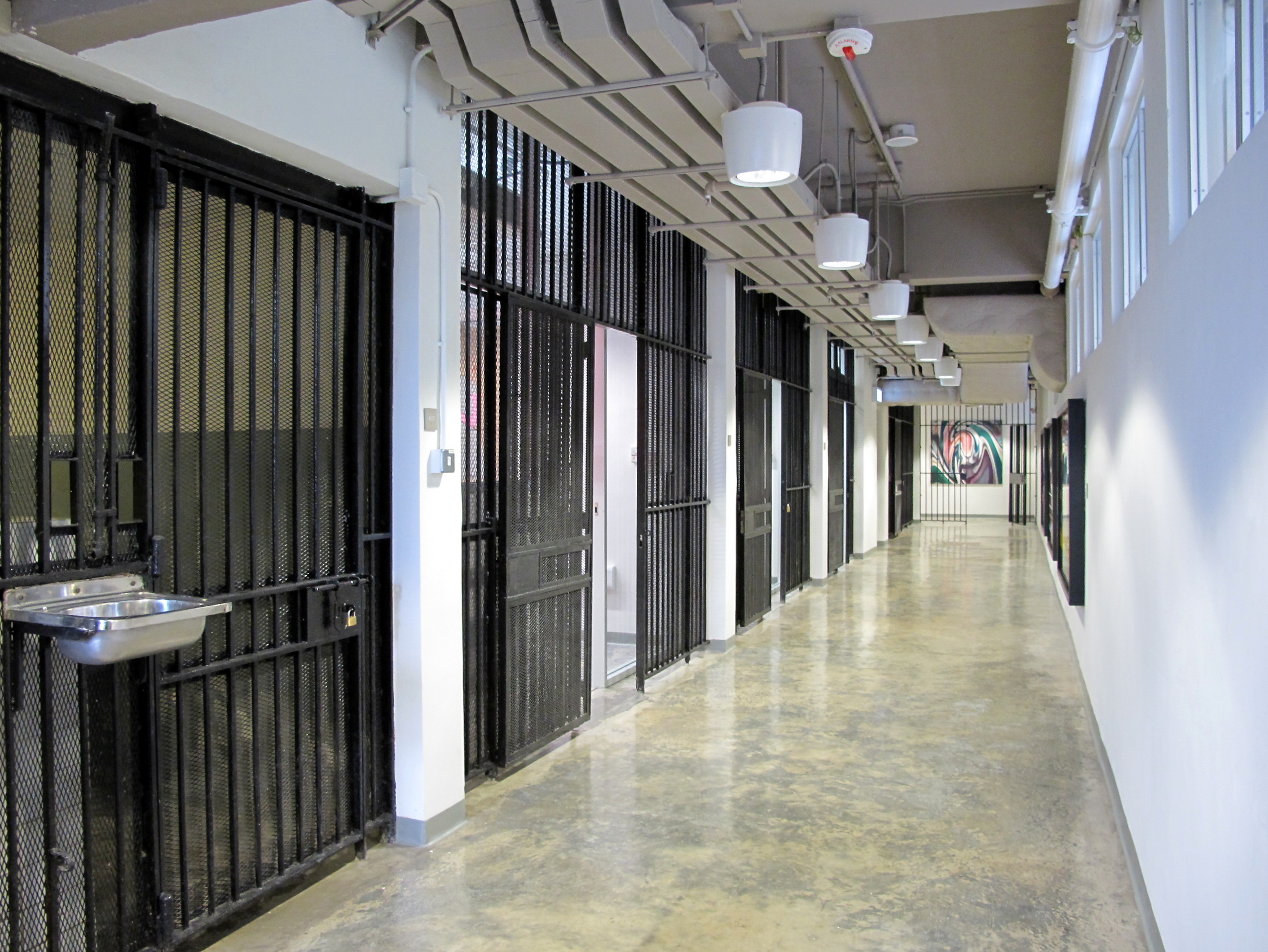
Jail inside Magistracy

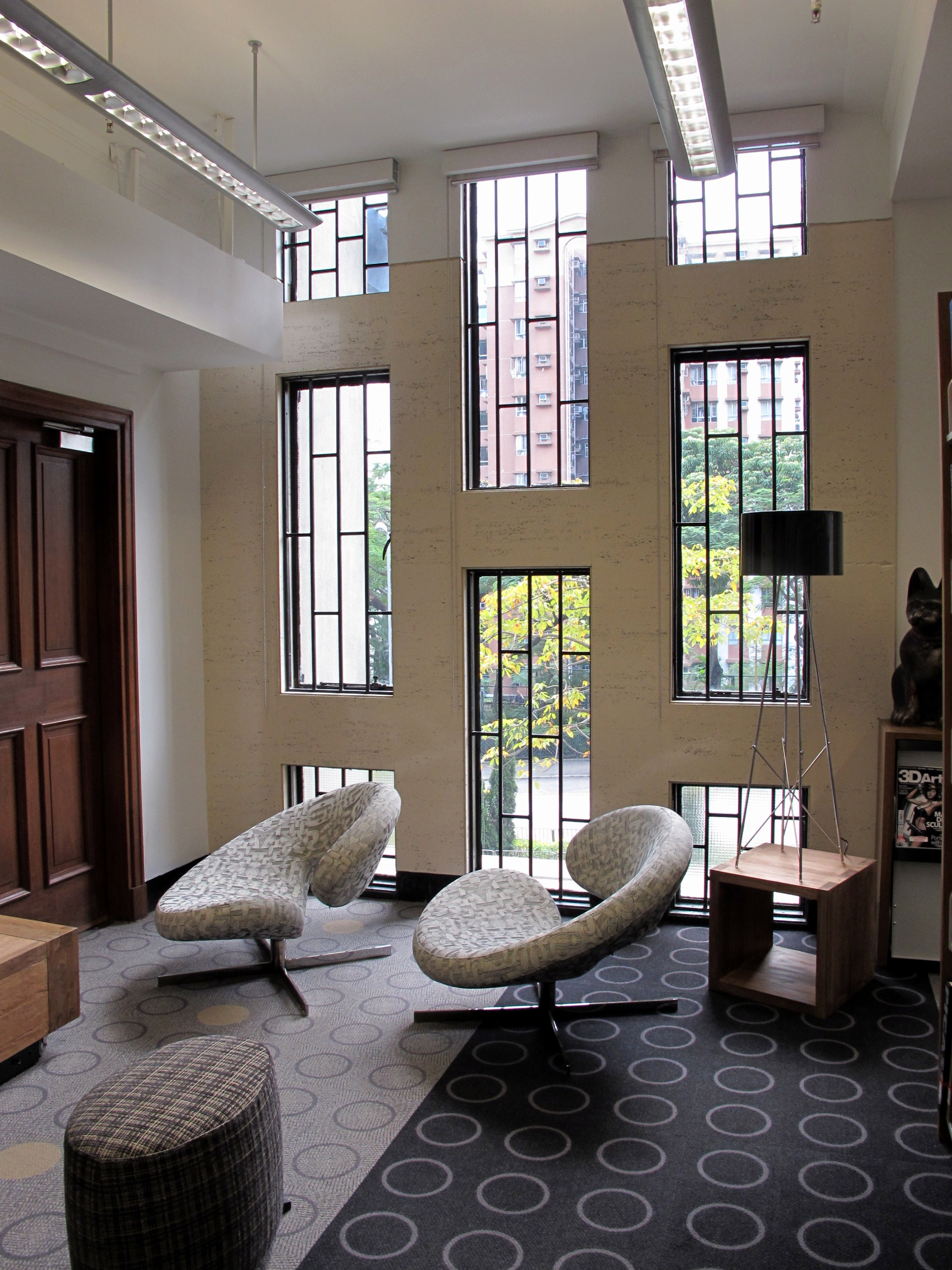
Windows design of Magistracy

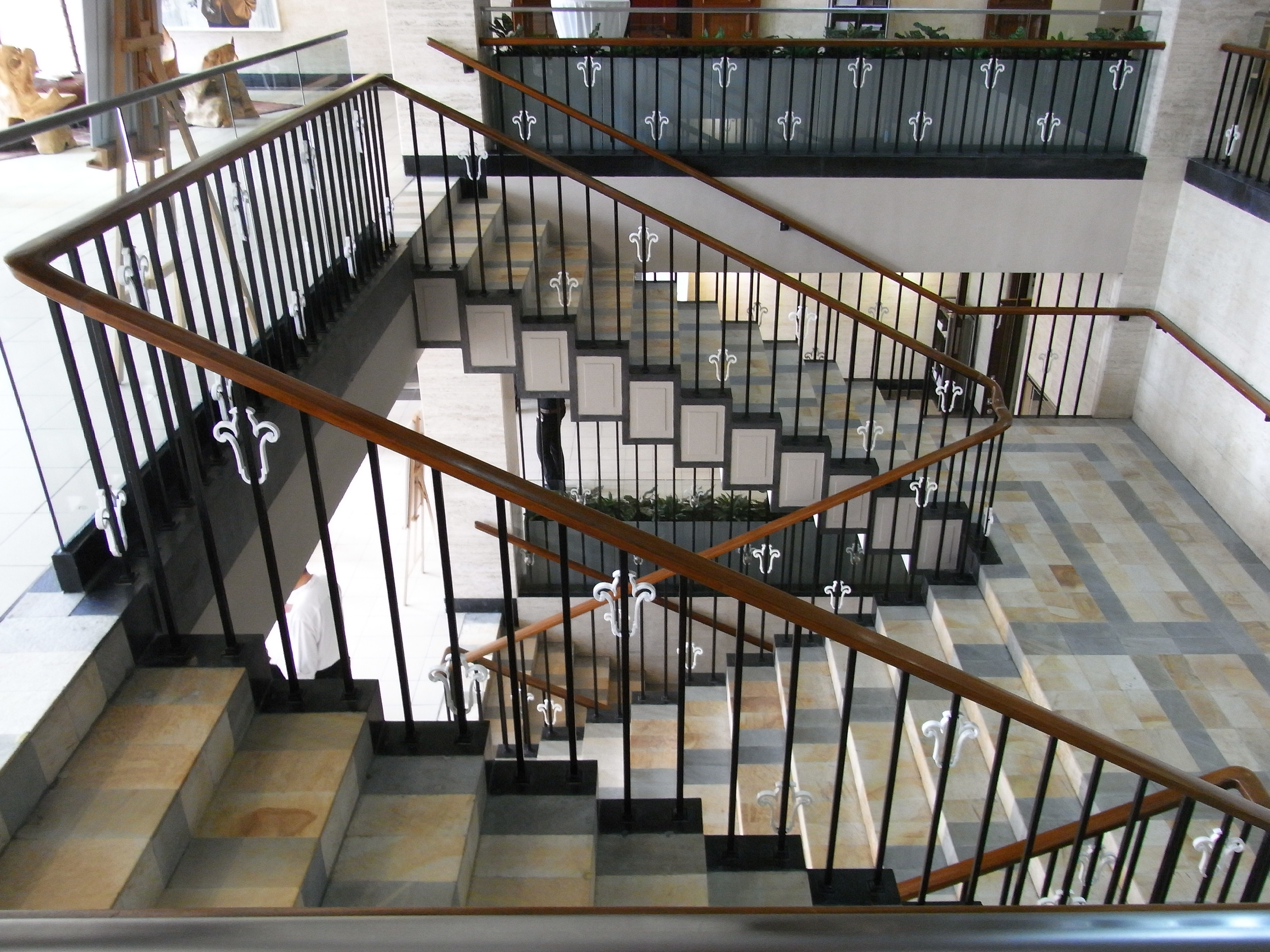
Stair design inside Magistracy

Before 1942, two magistracies were handling offences in Kowloon: one, located in Shanghai Street between Public Square Street and Market Street, was demolished in 1957. The other one was the Kowloon Magistracy in Gascoigne Road, built in 1936 and renamed the South Kowloon District Court in 1957. The North Kowloon Magistracy was built in 1960. After its completion, the building functioned as both magistrates' courts and space on the upper floors for more Government offices. It became the sole judicial court handling offences in Kowloon in 2000, when the magistracy in Gascoigne Road was closed.

The North Kowloon Magistracy was closed on 3 January 2005 due to cost saving policy of the government and consolidation of magistracies from nine to six. The estimated saving from the closure of North Kowloon Magistracy is HK$6.6 million a year coming mainly from the reduction of registry staff. Cases from this court have consequently been dealt with in Kwun Tong, Kowloon City and Sha Tin Magistrates' Courts.

=== Jurisdiction ===
The magistracy was classified as the lowest court that handled indictable and summary offences. It was made up of a Juvenile Court, four Magistrates' courts and government offices. Minor offences such as traffic conviction, littering and juvenile offences were treated in the Special Magistrates and Juvenile Court respectively. Solemn cases were usually transferred to the District Courts or the Court of First Instance. The maximum sentence in the Magistracy is two years' imprisonment and a mulct of $100,000. There were more than forty defendants attended the court daily and could reach up to eighty occasionally.

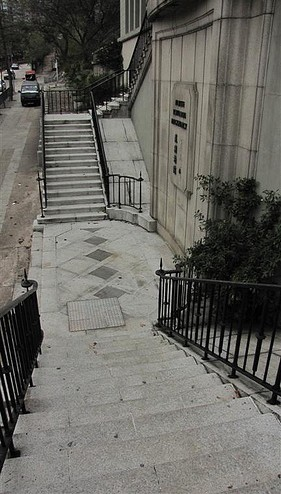
The staircase where parties face off in front of the Magistracy in Hong Kong television dramas and movies

=== Important events ===
The cases adjudicated in North Kowloon Magistracy were mostly minor ones including prostitution, illegal hawking and littering in prohibited areas.

On 7 December 1998, an elderly hawker suddenly set fire to himself in the Magistracy after he was convicted of illegal hawking, fined HK$400 and had his jade trinkets confiscated. He died two days later in the hospital.

In December 2002, someone sprayed red paint on the rear door of the Magistracy to support the implementation of Article 23, he was later charged with criminal damage to property.

In December 2003 Kwai Bing Hong (aka King of the Gangsters, 季炳雄) appeared in the Magistracy facing charges of illegal possession of firearms and causing grievous bodily harm to two police officers. Since Kwai was a mastermind of a cross-border gang and the most wanted criminal whom the Hong Kong Police Force had wished to apprehend, there were over one hundred armed police officers stationed outside the Magistracy on the trial date for security purposes.

== Architecture ==
The 7-storey court building was built in granite ashlar blocks in 1960 and designed by Palmer & Turner Architects. North Kowloon Magistracy is featured by the Neo-classical architecture and Stripped Classicism, a form of neo-classicism from which most of the traditional mouldings, ornament and details have been elided, visually emphasizing the structural and proportional systems. Although there are a few other buildings of similar design in Hong Kong, the Magistracy building appears to be the only surviving example of this building type and therefore can be considered as a rarity.

The building is divided into 3 functional zones and characterized by independent circulation access for general public, magistrates and staff, police and prisoners respectively. Its gross floor area is approximately 7,345 m^{2} with a central atrium.

On its front facade, there are central projecting bay, symmetrical tall and narrow windows. Tiled apron panels can be seen. The external wall is mostly grey with blue canopies. A central light well was constructed spanning the third to the fifth floor.

=== Construction materials ===
The materials used for construction of the building is reinforced concrete. For the exterior part, there are mainly granite finishes on the front facade, with granite sprayed as coverage. Dark blue glazed ceramic tiles were used too. For the interior part, various materials were adopted. Emulsion paint was used on the wall with some other floor finishes, e.g. vinyl and ceramic floor tiles and timber floor strips.

=== Architectural merits ===
==== External ====
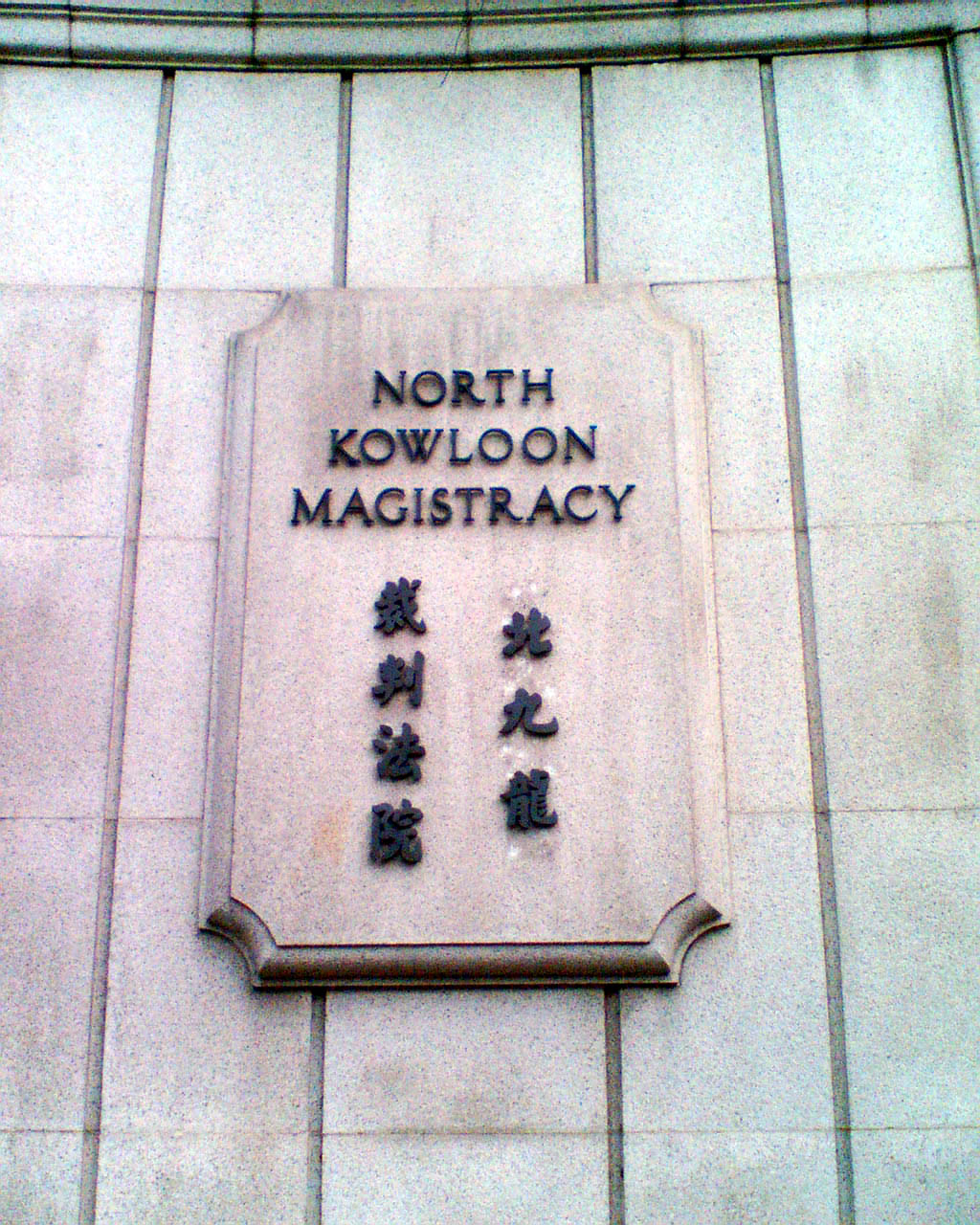
Stele with words of North Kowloon Magistracy carved both in Chinese and English

The door at the main entrance is a pair of bronze doors and the bronze doorcases with moulded architraves. Another major architectural feature of the building is the double half-turn unenclosed symmetrical grand staircase outside the door that form a hexagon. On the balustrade of staircases, there is ornamental ironwork featuring with Grecian motifs. Some landings, strings, spandrels in Italianate palazzo style can also be found.

==== Internal ====
There are ornamental handrails and guard bars to the windows, and Italianate balustrades on the staircases on the first three floors.

==== Defects ====
Minor cracks on walls and beams at some floors are found on the building. Spalling of concrete is also observed on ceilings of some floors. Regular maintenance and monitoring is required to keep the structural slabs, beams and columns in good condition.

== Conservation ==
Since its closure in 2005, the Hong Kong Government had suggested making the North Kowloon Magistracy a declared monument or turning the Magistracy into the headquarters of the Hong Kong Examinations and Assessment Authority. However, this proposal faced strong opposition from the Sham Shui Po District Council, which in turn suggested using the site to build a Legal History Museum.

=== SCAD Implementation ===
In 2008, the North Kowloon Magistracy was part of the seven buildings of Batch I of the Hong Kong Government's Revitalising Historic Buildings Through Partnership Scheme seeking adaptive reuse of government-owned historic buildings. On 17 February 2009, the government declared that the building will be used by the Savannah College of Art and Design (SCAD) as the school building.

SCAD was granted the right to use the building of the former North Kowloon Magistracy for its Hong Kong branch campus, which was its first campus in Asia, in addition to campuses in Savannah, GA, Atlanta, GA and Lacoste, France. The anticipated renovation period for the magistracy building was around 15 months and the school was opened in 2010, allowing the public to visit the old law courts and passages for prisoners. The estimated flow of students was expected to be about 130,000 headcounts per year for the first five years of opening.

It was expected that the project would house 40 classrooms, 16 faculty and staff offices, one library, one art gallery, and two computer laboratories. Also, two court rooms were converted into a digital studio and a lecture hall respectively. The project implemented a variety of greening measures such as use of high efficiency lighting and fixtures fabricated from sustainable materials.

A branch campus of the Savannah College of Art and Design (SCAD) was established, providing 1,500 student places at tertiary level for studies on digital media, including animation, advertising design, photography, graphic design, illustration, interactive design and game development, motion media design, and visual effects. The revitalisation and reconstruction project was estimated to cost approximately $100 million. SCAD's goals were to:

1. Establish Hong Kong as a pre-eminent site for the study of digital media in Asia;
2. Offer globally recognised digital media programmes, enhance global competitiveness in digital media and creative industries and increase educational diversity to Hong Kong;
3. Give more support to the development of creative industry in Hong Kong;
4. Set up a facility to provide cultural resources to both students and the professional industry; and
5. Add an international dimension to the Sham Shui Po district and revitalize the community.

Apart from the above, it was hoped that the project would obtain a synergy effect by cooperating with the nearby Jockey Club Creative Arts Centre and provide summer art programmes and campaigns to students.

The project retained the exterior appearance of the Magistracy. Parts of the building remained open to the public and a gallery was set up to display the history of the Magistracy. A website was also created to show the comparison between the old Magistracy building and the newly renovated SCAD-Hong Kong Campus.

After 10 years in the city, SCAD announced in March 2020 that it would discontinue studies at its Hong Kong location by June, citing concerns about student safety and academic quality following the 2019–20 Hong Kong protests and the COVID-19 pandemic. SCAD students in Hong Kong were given the option to transfer to other SCAD campuses if they wanted to continue their studies. The building was returned to the city upon the expiry of its lease.

=== Controversy over revitalisation scheme ===
Much controversy had arisen in the bidding process of the Scheme. Cantonese opera 'big sister' Liza Wang Ming-Chun who led the Chinese Artist Association of Hong Kong had submitted a proposal of renovating the Magistracy into a Cantonese opera training and performance centre. Immediately before the announcement of the result, Wang claimed that her association's plan would be rejected and the outcome was already 'fixed'. Wang's outburst has caused much public outcry and as a result the chairman of the Advisory Committee on Revitalization of Historic Buildings, Bernard Charnwut Chan, had to clean up the rumours on air.

On 17 February 2009, Liza Wang strongly protested against the result of the scheme, said she wanted to cry and threatened to take the matter up with then Chief Executive Donald Tsang. The emotional outburst had drawn a big audience from the public and the incident was reported in the media for days. It was later reported in the newspapers that the association's initial proposal had a comparable score to the ultimate winner SCAD, but fell short at the interview stage because Wang was unable to convince the Advisory Committee, with an estimated operating cost of $15 million and foreseeable difficulty in raising funds.

== In popular culture ==
In legal or crime-themed movies or television set in Hong Kong, the building's courtrooms are sometimes used as stand-ins for other courts. A Guilty Conscience (2023), which was set in the High Court, was filmed in the North Kowloon Magistracy.

== Other places in the surroundings ==
- The nearest historic building is Mei Ho House (Grade I) of the old Shek Kip Mei Housing Estate
- Fook Tak Kwu Miu, 'Happiness and Virtue Ancient Temple' (港九福德念佛社)
- Saviour Lutheran School, a special school
- Hong Kong Sze Yap Commercial and Industrial Association School, a primary school
