= West Kowloon Law Courts Building =

Courthouse in Sham Shui Po, Hong Kong

- 西九龍法院大樓
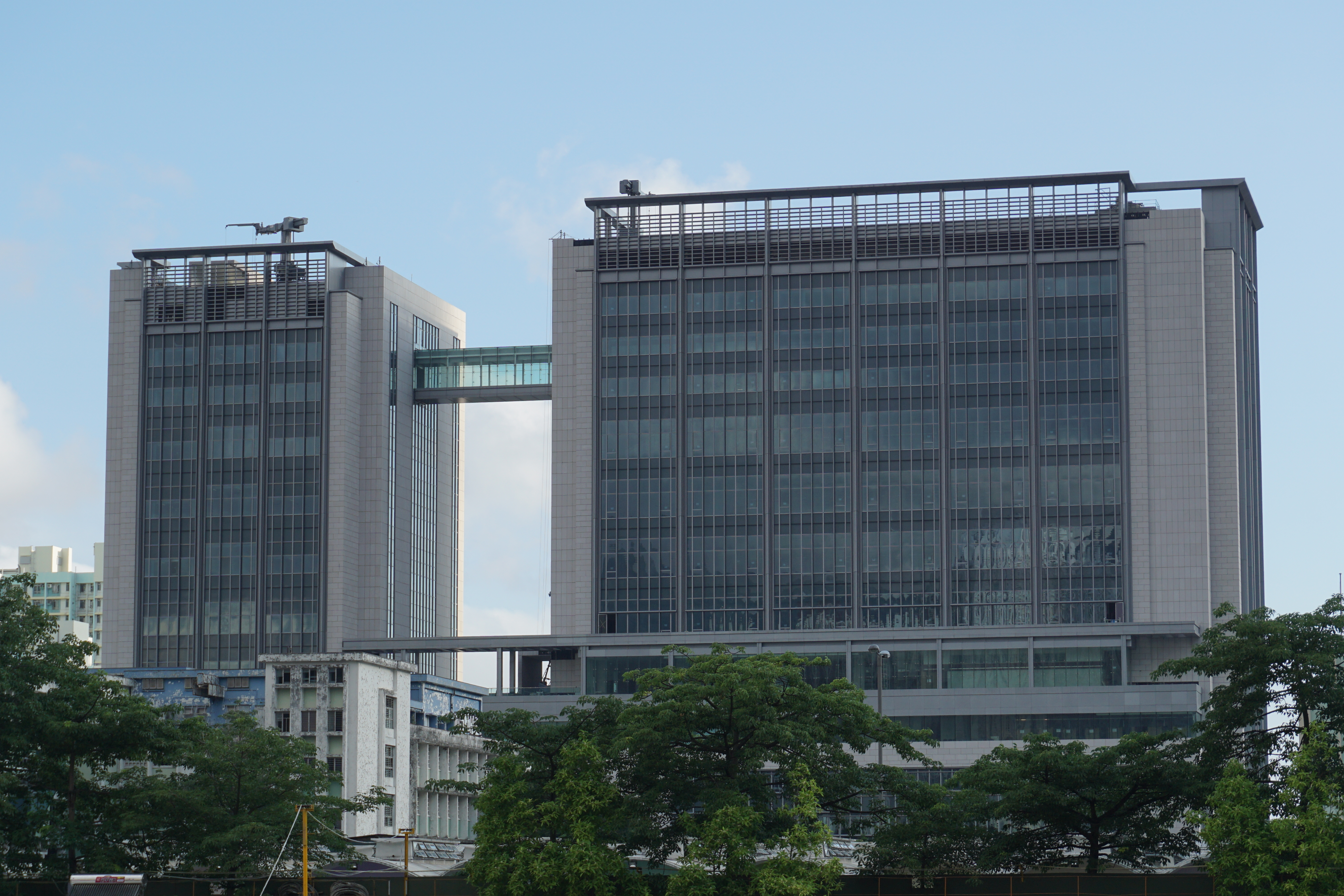
- Construction as of June 2016
- Interactive map of the West Kowloon Law Courts Building area

General information
- Status: Completed
- Location: 501 Tung Chau Street, Sham Shui Po, Hong Kong
- Coordinates: 22.33107°N 114.15328°E
- Opened: 19 September 2016; 9 years ago
- Cost: HK$2.7 billion
- Client: The Judiciary

Technical details
- Floor area: 60,320 square metres (649,300 sq ft)

Design and construction
- Developer: Architectural Services Department
- Services engineer: Southa Group
- Main contractor: Shui On Construction

Website
- https://www.judiciary.hk/en/home/index.html

West Kowloon Law Courts Building
- Traditional Chinese: 西九龍法院大樓
Transcriptions
Yue: Cantonese
- Yale Romanization: Sāi gáu lùhng faat yún daaih làuh
- Jyutping: Sai1 gau2 lung4 faat3 jun2 daai6 lau4

The West Kowloon Law Courts Building is a courthouse in Sham Shui Po, Kowloon, Hong Kong. It is located at the junction of Tung Chau Street and Tonkin Street West, beside the elevated West Kowloon Corridor.

The courthouse provides a total net operational floor area (NOFA) of about 16,500 square metres (178,000 sq ft). This figure does not include service areas like corridors, car parking, lobbies, balconies, etc. The total floor area has been quoted as being about 60,000 square metres (650,000 sq ft). It is much larger than a standard Hong Kong courthouse, and as such has been referred to as the "mega court" in local media.

== History ==
The new building was proposed in 2009 to consolidate under one roof the Tsuen Wan Magistrates’ Courts, Small Claims Tribunal, Coroner’s Courts, Obscene Articles Tribunal, and other facilities. It also addresses a shortfall in the number of available courtrooms.

The contract for the design and construction of the courthouse was awarded to Shui On Construction in 2012. The building was completed in 2016.

The Small Claims Tribunal relocated to the new courthouse on 19 September 2016. The Tsuen Wan Magistrates' Courts followed on 28 December 2016, and was renamed the West Kowloon Magistrates' Courts. The Coroner's Court and the Obscene Articles Tribunal moved on 16 January 2017.

== Transport ==
The courts building is roughly about a 10-minute walk to both Nam Cheong station and Cheung Sha Wan station of the Mass Transit Railway (MTR).
