= Former Kowloon Magistracy =

Coordinates: 22.3077°N 114.1726°E

Old South Kowloon District Court Building
- 前南九龍裁判法院
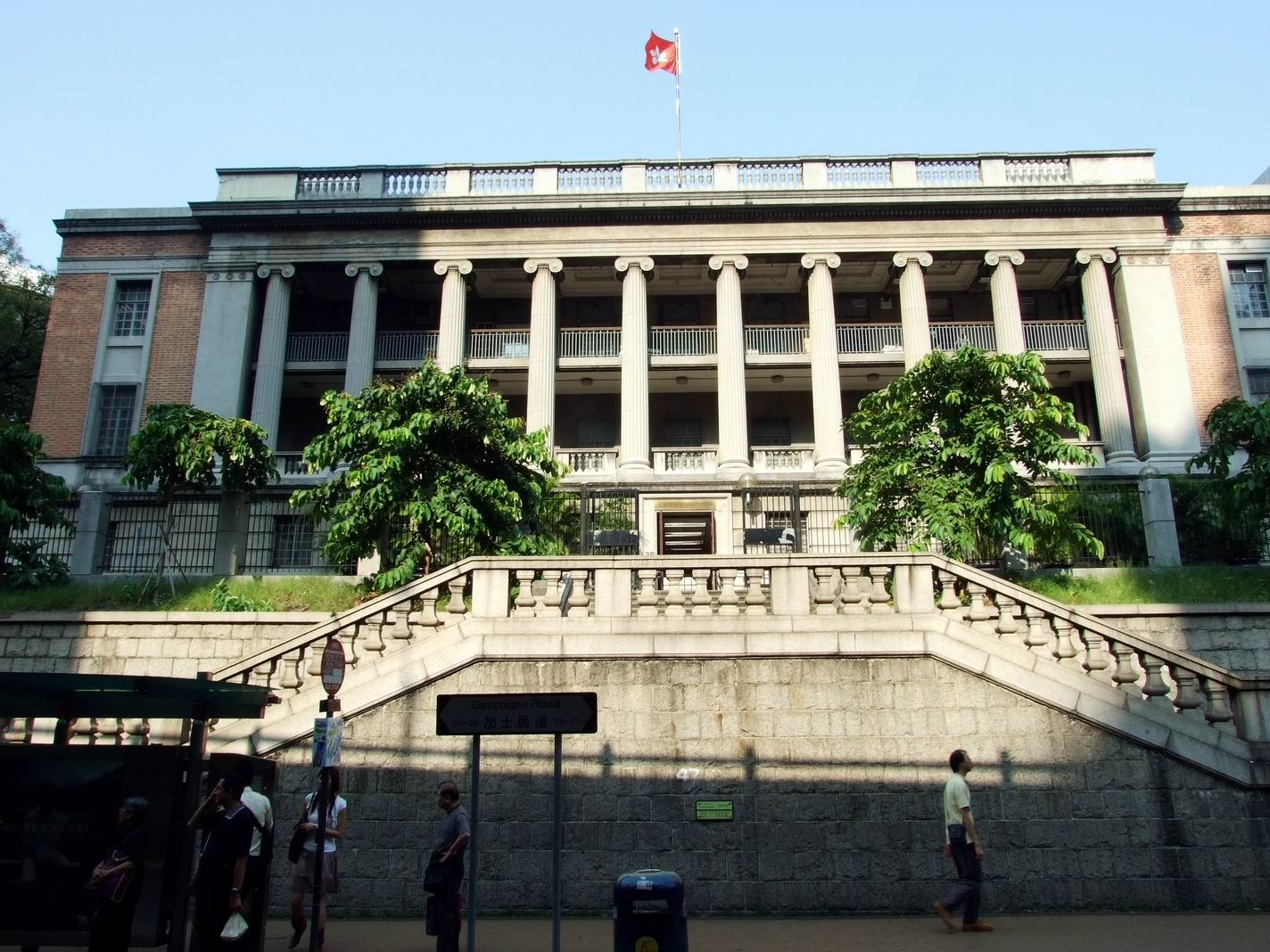
- Facade of the former Kowloon Magistracy in Gascoigne Road.
- Interactive map of the Old South Kowloon District Court Building area

General information
- Type: Courthouse
- Location: Yau Ma Tei, Kowloon, 38 Gascoigne Road, Hong Kong
- Completed: 1933

Design and construction
- Designations

Hong Kong Graded Building – Grade I
- Designated: 18 December 2009
- Reference no.: 128

Former Kowloon Magistracy
- Traditional Chinese: 前南九龍裁判法院
- Simplified Chinese: 前南九龙裁判法院
Transcriptions
Standard Mandarin
- Hanyu Pinyin: Qián Nán Jiǔlóng Cáipàn Fǎyuàn
Yue: Cantonese
- Yale Romanization: Chìhn nàahm gáu lùhng chòih pun faat yún
- Jyutping: Cin4 naam4 gau2 lung4 coi4 pun3 faat3 jyun6*2

The former Kowloon Magistracy is a historic building and former Magistrate's and District Court in Hong Kong, located at No. 38 Gascoigne Road, Yau Ma Tei, Kowloon.

== History ==
Constructed under the direction of Director of Public Works Richard McNeil Henderson in 1933, the building housed a court handling minor criminal cases at magistrate's level. During the Japanese occupation of Hong Kong, it served as the Kowloon headquarters of the Kempeitai. It later served as the Kowloon District Court which was renamed in 1957 the South Kowloon District Court. After the opening of the North Kowloon Magistracy in 1960, some cases were diverted there. The South Kowloon District Court remained in use as a district court until 1986 when it became the Judiciary Central File Repository. It has served as the Lands Tribunal (土地審裁處) since 1997 and accommodates five courts.

The South Kowloon Magistracy moved to a building next door (36 Gascoigne Road) where it operated until final closure in 2000.

== Conservation ==
The former Kowloon Magistracy was listed as a Grade II historic building in 1992 and upgraded to Grade I in 2009.
