= Family Court (Hong Kong) =

Coordinates: 22°16′48.02″N 114°10′20.48″E

- Jurisdiction: Hong Kong
- Location: Hong Kong
- Authorised by: Hong Kong Basic Law
- Website: judiciary.hk

Principal Family Judge
- Currently: C K Chan

The Family Court (in case citations effective 2018, HKFC) is a division within the District Court of Hong Kong. It mainly deals with cases relating to divorces and welfare maintenance for children.

== Composition ==
As of 1 October 2021 the Principal Family Court Judge is C. K. Chan, and there are 42 District Judges.

== Divorce law ==
Hong Kong residents can start a petition for divorce only if having been married for at least one year and be able to prove reasons (or "grounds") for saying that the marriage has irretrievably broken down. They have to fill in a petition form and take it personally to the Family Court Registry. If the couple jointly apply to the court, they should together fill in a joint application form. If there are children of the family who are under the age of 18, Their custody and access must be included. Petitioners seeking legal advice can contact the Duty Lawyer Service's free Legal Advice Scheme for preliminary legal advice including matrimonial law in District Offices.

== Family mediation ==
The Family Court holds family mediation designed to help couples who are divorcing or separating reach their own mutually acceptable agreements about ongoing arrangements for their children and / or how to resolve financial matters. It is a voluntary process in which a specially trained, impartial third person, the mediator, seeks to help both sides to communicate effectively and to negotiate issues in dispute, all in a completely confidential setting.

== See also ==
- Judiciary of Hong Kong
- Legal system of Hong Kong
