= Gascoigne Road =

Road in Hong Kong

Coordinates: 22.30897°N 114.17089°E

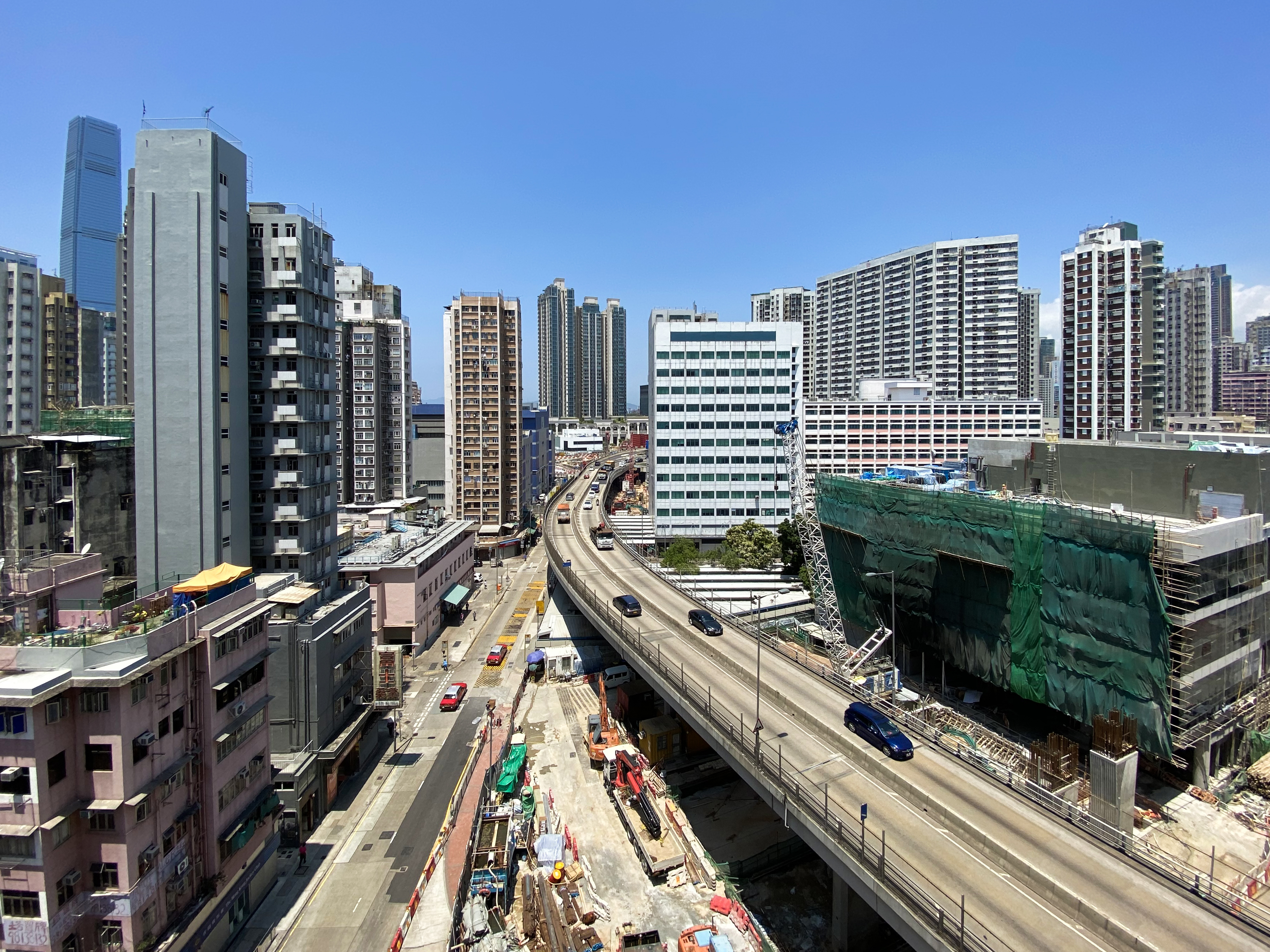
- Gascoigne Road and flyover in May 2020.
- Chinese: 加士居道
Transcriptions
Standard Mandarin
- Hanyu Pinyin: Jiāshìjūdào
Yue: Cantonese
- Yale Romanization: ga1 si6 geui1 dou6
- Jyutping: gaa1 si6 geoi1 dou6

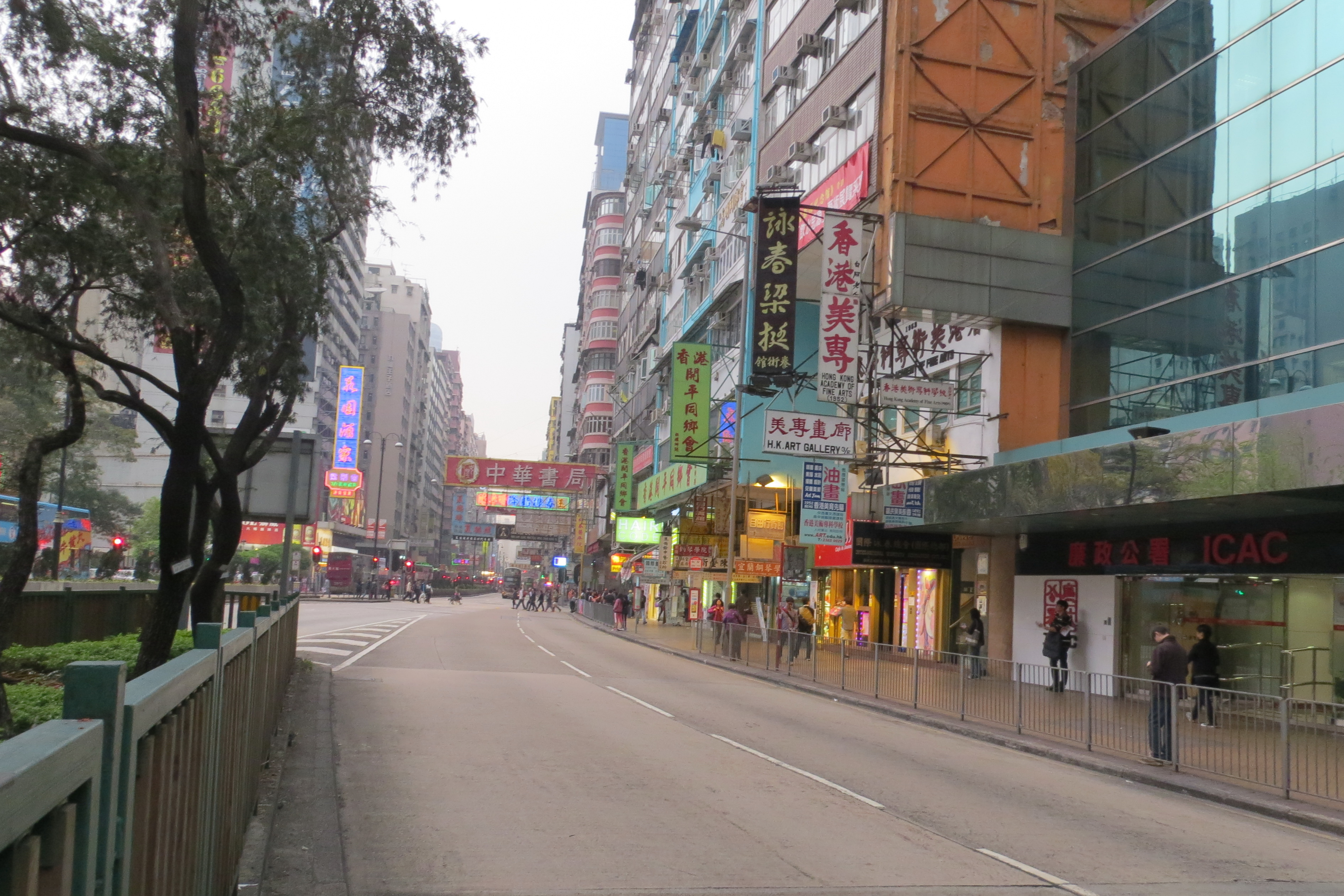
The western end of Gascoigne Road (right), merging into Nathan Road in Yau Ma Tei in February 2013.

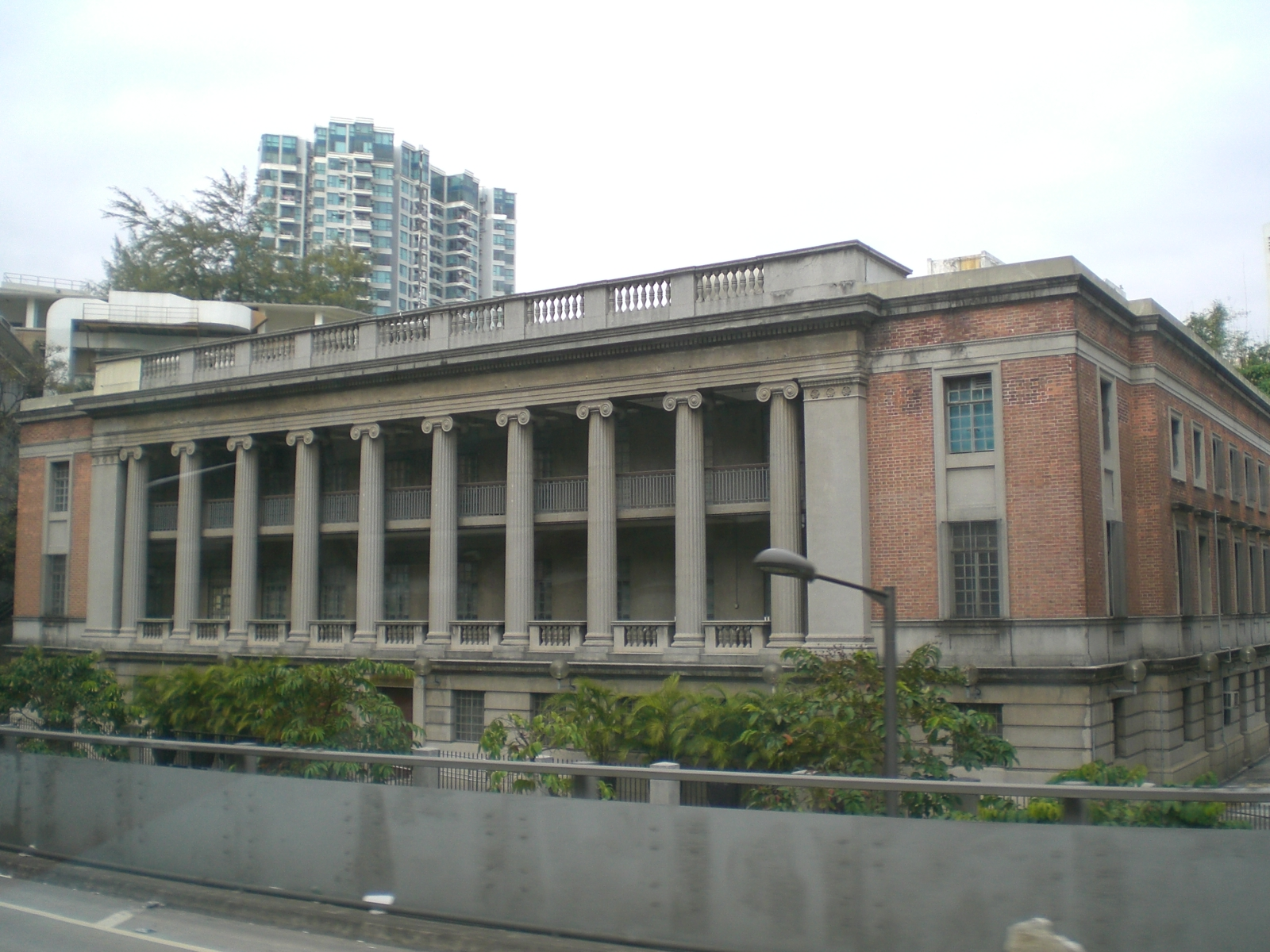
The Old South Kowloon District Court, viewed from Gascoigne Road Flyover in December 2007.

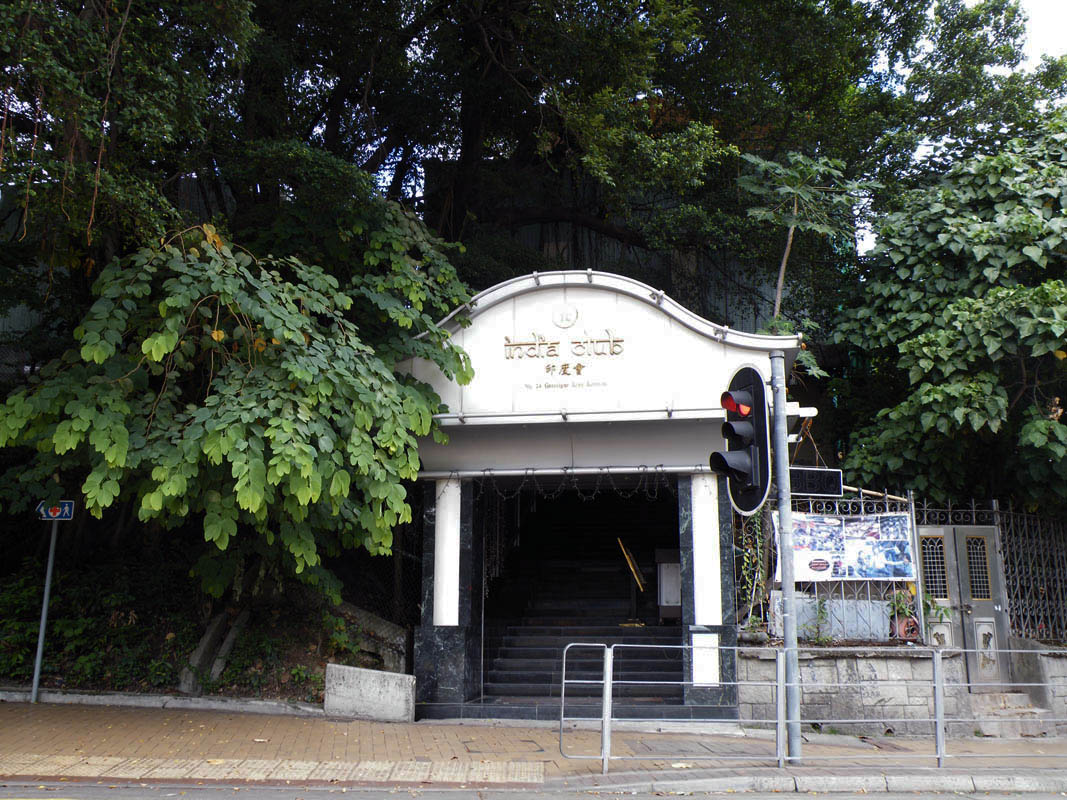
India Club entrance at the corner of Gascoigne Road and Queen Elizabeth Hospital Road in August 2010.

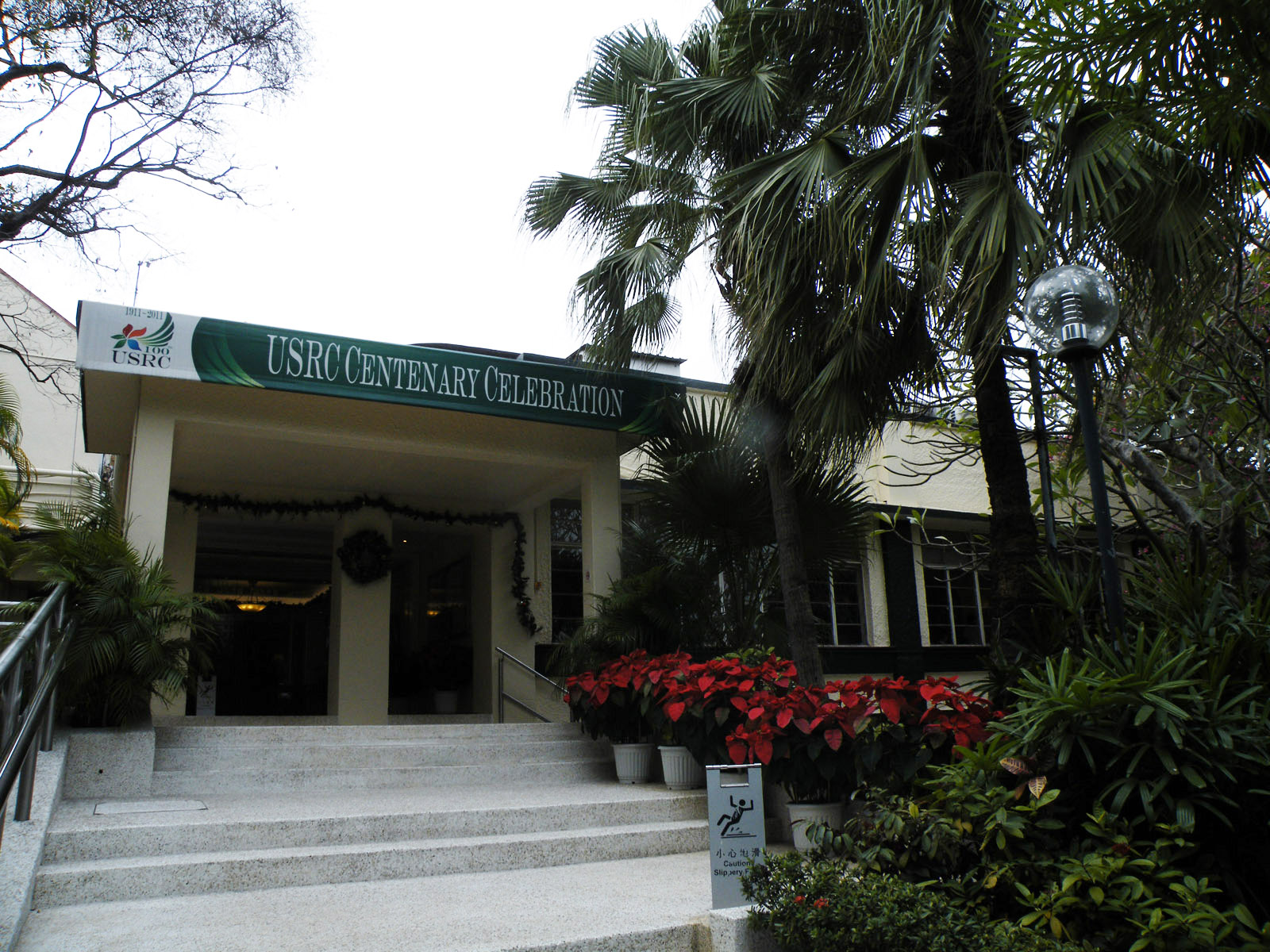
United Services Recreation Club in December 2011.

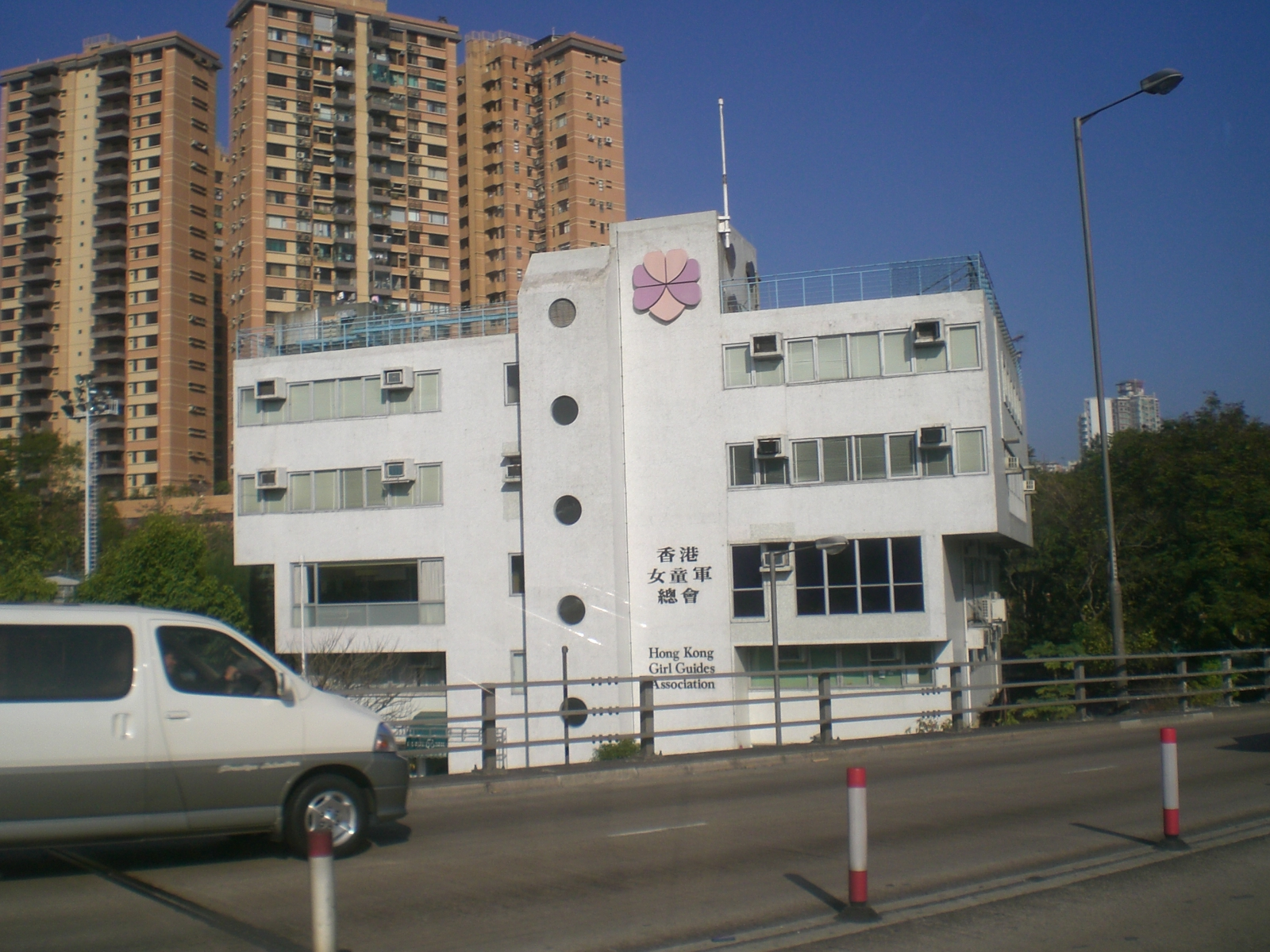
Headquarter building of the Hong Kong Girl Guides Association, seen from Gascoigne Road Flyover in January 2008.

Gascoigne Road (Chinese: 加士居道; Jyutping: gaa1 si6 geoi1 dou6) is a main road in Kowloon, Hong Kong, going west-east from Nathan Road to Chatham Road South through the head of King's Park, leading vehicles from West Kowloon to the Cross-Harbour Tunnel.

Gascoigne Road Flyover (加士居道天橋; gaa1 si6 geoi1 dou6 tin1 kiu4) is a 1.2 km (0.75 mi) long flyover linking between Gascoigne Road and Ferry Street, passing through Yaumatei Carpark Building. Built in 1977, it is part of the West Kowloon Corridor.

== History ==
The road was laid out after 1901 and named after William Julius Gascoigne, Commander British Troops in China and Hong Kong from 1898–1903. It was reported in 1908 that "All the roads on the [Kowloon] peninsula are wide and lined with trees, and two in particular—Robinson Road [today's Nathan Road] and Gascoigne Road—are noticeable by reason of their width" and "Gascoigne Road, which is 100 feet wide, runs right across the peninsula from Hunghom to Yaumati, and skirts the King's Park, a large enclosure reserved for recreation, and the United Services Recreation Ground."

The Fronde Memorial, a granite obelisk, was erected in May 1908 in memory of the five sailors of the French Arquebuse-class destroyer Fronde who disappeared in the sinking of their boat near the Torpedo Depot, Kowloon, during the 1906 Hong Kong typhoon. Initially erected at the corner of Gascoigne Road and Jordan Road, the monument was relocated to Hong Kong Cemetery in Happy Valley during the 1960s. The Fronde was later salvaged, repaired in the Hung Hom shipyard, and left Hong Kong in March 1907. It was active during World War I and was decommissioned in 1919.

Gascoigne Road was widened in 1988 and the adjacent slope near the Queen Elizabeth Hospital was cut back. A 12m high rock-socketed caisson retaining wall was constructed to support the cutting.

== Features ==
Northern side of the road: (from east to west)

- Headquarters building of the Hong Kong Girl Guides Association (#8)
- Club de Recreio (西洋波會) (#20). The Club was founded in 1911 by prominent members of the Portuguese community in Hong Kong. The present clubhouse was built in 1928. Grade III historic building.
- YMCA King's Park Centenary Centre (#22)
- India Club (印度會) (#24). The present clubhouse building was built in 1956. Grade III historic building.
- Queen Elizabeth Hospital (#30)
- Hong Kong Labour Tribunal (#36)
- Old South Kowloon District Court (#38). Grade I historic building.
- Kowloon Methodist Church (循道衛理聯合教會九龍堂) (#40). Erected between 1950 and 1951, it is the largest church building of the Methodist Church in Hong Kong.
- Methodist College (Kowloon) (#50). The campus includes the buildings of the former Grantham College of Education, which was located at No. 42 Gascoigne Road.
- Former access to an air raid precaution (ARP) tunnel. Near the junction with Nathan Road.

Southern side of the road: (from east to west)

- Gun Club Hill Barracks
- United Services Recreation Club (USRC; 三軍會) (#1). Opened in 1911 as a British military club, it is now owned by the People's Liberation Army, but administered as a limited company with a wholly civilian membership.
- Diocesan Girls' School
- Eaton Hotel Hong Kong

== See also ==
- List of streets and roads in Hong Kong
