= Hong Kong Letters Patent 1917 =

- Coat of arms of Hong Kong

Overview
- Jurisdiction: British Hong Kong
- Created: 1917
- System: Crown colony (1841-1981); Dependent territory (1981-1997)
- Head of state: Monarchy of the United Kingdom
- Chambers: Legislative Council of Hong Kong
- Executive: Governor of Hong Kong
- First legislature: 26 June 1843; 182 years ago
- First executive: 26 June 1843; 182 years ago
- Author: George V
- Supersedes: Hong Kong Letters Patent of 1888
- Superseded by: Hong Kong Letters Patent 1939; Hong Kong Basic Law (effective 1 July 1997 after the handover of Hong Kong

Full text
- Hong Kong Letters Patent 1917 at Wikisource

The Hong Kong Letters Patent 1917 was one of the principal constitutional instruments of Hong Kong when she was a British Crown colony and dependent territory, being part of a series of other letters patent that included the Hong Kong Letters Patent 1960, the Hong Kong Letters Patent 1982, and the Hong Kong Letters Patent 1991 (No. 1). It was used in conjunction with the Hong Kong Royal Instructions 1917.

== History ==
The Hong Kong Letters Patent 1917 superseded the letters patent issued on 5 April 1843, all subsequent letters patent amending the 1843 one, and the letters patent issued on 19 January 1888 (which replaced the 1843 letters patent and all those amending the 1843 one).

Issued under the royal prerogative, the letters patent was the formal legal basis of the office of Governor and Commander-in-Chief, the Executive Council, and the Legislative Council. The Hong Kong Letters Patent 1917 has been amended many times since its coming into force. An example of this was when in 1991 when the Hong Kong Bill of Rights Ordinance was introduced as an amendment to the letters patent. The intent was to bring a justiciable version of the International Covenant on Civil and Political Rights human rights law into Hong Kong law. The 1917 letters patent, as amended from time to time, remained part of the basis for Hong Kong's system of government until the transfer of the territory's sovereignty on 1 July 1997 to the People's Republic of China.

After the transfer of sovereignty to China, the Hong Kong Letters Patent 1917 ceased to have legal effect, as it is superseded by the new Basic Law.

== See also ==
- Hong Kong Letters Patent (see this article for a list of all Hong Kong Letters Patent)
- Hong Kong Royal Instructions 1917
- Hong Kong Royal Instructions (see this article for a list of all Hong Kong Royal Instructions and all Hong Kong Additional Instructions)
- History of Hong Kong
- Colonial Hong Kong
- Letters patent
- Royal assent
- Organic Statute of Macau, the Portuguese Macau equivalent
