= Public Order Ordinance =

Ordinance of Hong Kong

Legislative Council of Hong Kong
- Long title: An Ordinance to consolidate and amend the law relating to the maintenance of public order, the control of organizations, meetings, places, vessels and aircraft, unlawful assemblies and riots and matters incidental thereto or connected therewith.
- Citation: Cap. 245
- Enacted by: Legislative Council of Hong Kong
- Assented to: 17 November 1967
- Commenced: 17 November 1967

Legislative history
- Introduced by: Attorney General Denys Roberts
- Introduced: 3 November 1967
- First reading: 1 November 1967
- Second reading: 15 November 1967
- Third reading: 15 November 1967

Amended by
- 1969, 1970, 1971, 1972, 1973, 1975, 1977, 1978, 1980, 1982, 1983, 1987, 1989, 1990, 1992, 1995, 1996, 1997, 1998, 1999, 2001, 2002, 2003, 2008, 2012, 2013, 2017

Related legislation
- Peace Preservation Ordinance; Summary Offences Ordinance
- Status: Current legislation

The Public Order Ordinance (Cap. 245; Chinese: 公安條例; ’POO’) is a piece of primary legislation in Hong Kong. It codifies a number of old common law public order offences. It imposes notification requirements for public processions and meetings which resemble a licensing regime. It also provides for the designation of restricted areas along the Hong Kong-China border and in the military installations. The 1967 Ordinance was enacted in the aftermath of the 1967 Leftist riots. For the following decades, the stringent control over public processions and meetings was relaxed incrementally until 1990s when it was brought in line with human rights standards. Upon Hong Kong handover, the amendments in the 1990s were decreed "not adopted as the laws of the HKSAR" by the NPCSC of China and therefore reverted.

== History ==
=== Colonial period ===
A 1948 Ordinance of the same short title was enacted in 1948 by the British colonial government. The 1948 Ordinance transplanted the Public Order Act 1936 in the United Kingdom and the binding over procedure in the criminal code of Straits Settlements. It provided for the designation of restricted areas along the Hong Kong-China border.

The Public Ordinance Ordinance, 1967 was enacted in the aftermath of the 1967 Leftist riots. The government relied on a number of emergency laws to suppress the prolonged unrest. The bill was published on 6 October 1967 and was passed into law on 15 November 1967 by the Legislative Council. The 1967 version of the law was a consolidation of various pieces of preexisting legislation with some substantive amendments. Before the enactment of the 1967 POO, the law dealing with public order was to be found in a previous POO, the Peace Preservation Ordinance, the Summary Offences Ordinance and in the common law.

Under the revised POO in 1980, it generated a licensing system for gatherings in public place.

The Public Order (Amendment) Bill 1986 raised concerns over the threat to freedom of speech as the government on the one hand took some potentially oppressive measures including its power to seize and suppress newspapers and other publications, off the books, but on the other hand strengthened provisions against "false news": the new provision stated that "any person who publishes false news likely to cause alarm to the public or a section thereof or disturb public order shall be guilty of an offence." The pro-democrats argued the definition of "false news" was not clearly defined. In 1989, the government repealed the section on its own initiative.

In 1991 the final years of the colonial rule, the Hong Kong Bill of Rights Ordinance Cap. 383 was enacted. A number of ordinances, including the POO that were thought to possibly violate the Bill of Rights had to be reviewed.

In 1995, most provisions in the law was repealed by the Legislative Council as part of the government to bring Hong Kong law in line with the International Covenant on Civil and Political Rights, and the licensing system was replaced by a simple notification procedure.

In October 1996, Democratic Party's legislator James To introduced a private member's bill to amend section 6 of the POO to remove the power of the Commissioner of Police to control the extent to which music or speech might be amplified. The Secretary for Security Peter Lai moved an amendment to make it more explicit that the Commission of Police would exercise such power only if "he reasonably considers it to be necessary to prevent an imminent threat to public safety or public order". The Secretary for Security's amendment was carried and the 1996 Amendment Ordinance came into effect on 20 December 1996.

=== SAR administration ===
The People's Republic of China government was convinced that the 1995 amendment in the late colonial days was maliciously motivated and aimed at reducing legitimate public order regulatory powers of the government of Hong Kong Special Administrative Region. The PRC considered the Bill of Rights Ordinance and the 1995 POO to contravene the Hong Kong Basic Law. The Preliminary Working Committee for the HKSAR, an organ oversaw the preparatory works for the transfer of the sovereignty consisting members who were appointed by the PRC government, proposed to reinstate the POO. Therefore, on 23 February 1997, the Standing Committee of the National People's Congress passed a resolution that under Article 160 of the Basic Law that major amendments to the POO would be scrapped.

Following up the NPC's decision, the Office of the Chief Executive Designate proposed amendments to the POO, together with the Societies Ordinance and issued a hastily prepared consultation document "Civil Liberty and Social Order" to the public in April 1997. The proposed amendments created widespread criticisms that the future SAR government intended to restrict Hong Kong people's civil liberties. The colonial Hong Kong government even distribute a commentary criticising the proposals in unusual manner. The CE Office scaled down the amendments on 15 May in result. The Hong Kong Provisional Legislative Council enacted the new version of the POO on 14 June 1997, and it came into force on 1 July 1997. The restored and amended provisions were seen as a halfway between the licensing and notification systems.

== 1997 version ==
The 1997 amendment of the law gives government the power to prohibit a public meeting or procession on the grounds of "national security" and "the protection of the rights and freedoms of others," in addition to preexisting grounds of "public safety" and "public order." Under the section 17A any failure to do is a criminal offence and may face an imprisonment term of up to five years.

The details of the current version of the POO that restrict the right of assembly:

- A public procession consisting of more than 30 persons can only take place if the Police Commissioner has been notified a week in advance and the Commissioner has notified the organiser that he has no objection. § 13(2)
- The Commissioner can object to the public procession, but only if he reasonably considers that the objection is necessary in the interests of national security or public safety, public order or the protection of the rights and freedoms of others. § 14(1)
- The Commissioner may, where he reasonably considers it necessary in the interests of national security or public safety, public order or for the protection of the rights and freedoms of others, impose conditions in respect of any public procession notified under section 13A, and notice of any condition so imposed shall be given in writing to the organiser and shall state the reasons why such condition is considered necessary. § 15(2)
- Further requirements include the presence of the organiser at the procession, maintenance of good order and public safety, the prohibition of unreasonable use of amplification devices, compliance with directions given by a police officer for ensuring compliance with the Commissioner's requirements and the POO's requirements etc. § 15(4)

On the other hand, certain statutory safeguards are present in the POO.

- The Commissioner can accept notice that is given in less than a week. If he decides not to, he must inform the organizers in writing as soon as possible and give reasons. § 13A(2)
- The Commissioner can only reject an application if he considers objection is necessary for the statutory legitimate purposes. The "protection of public health & morals" purpose in the Bill of Rights is absent in the POO, hence restricting the Commissioner's discretion. § 14(1)
- The objection must be given as soon as possible and within the statutory time limit. § 14(2)
- The Commissioner is obliged not to object if he reasonably considers that the relevant statutory legitimate purposes could be met by imposing conditions. § 14(5)
- The Commissioner's discretion may only be delegated to police officers of inspector or above. § 52
- A decision by the Commissioner can be appealed to an Appeal Board. The decision of the Appeal Board can be judicially reviewed (but not appealed). § 16

=== "Public place" ===
"Public gathering", "public meeting" and "public procession" under the POO is defined with reference to the term "public place". All of the above activities must take place in a "public place"

”Public place" is defined under s.2 of the POO as:

any place to which for the time being the public or any section of the public are entitled or permitted to have access, whether on payment or otherwise, and, in relation to any meeting, includes any place which is or will be, on the occasion and for the purposes of such meeting, a public place

The test for whether a place is a "public place" is "whether the persons who are entitled or permitted to have access to the particular location or area are so entitled or permitted qua their being members of the public or members of a section of the public" (HKSAR v Chau Fung [1998] 4 HKC 652). In Kwok Cheuk Kin v Commissioner of Police, the Court stated that "private premises to which access is restricted to the lawful occupiers’ invitees or licensees (in addition to, of course, the lawful occupiers themselves) would not generally be regarded as “public places” under the Ordinance" ([27]). In R v Lam Shing Chow, the accused was charged with "Fight in public". The appeal court quashed the conviction because the fight took place in a common corridor of a residential flat which is not a "public place". On the contrary, in 香港特別行政區政府 訴 梁超明 [2002] HKCFI 170, since the public is allowed to enter into the reception area of the Law Society located on 3/F Wing On House, the area constitutes a "public place" within the meaning of s.2 of the POO.

Cinemas and racecourses are public places despite the fact that the public might be required to purchase tickets for entry (HKSAR v Pearce [2005] 4 HKC 105 and HKSAR v Chau Fung [1998] 4 HKC 652).

Areas within a university campus where the public has access would constitute a public place while other school campuses or private areas of university campuses would not constitute "public places".

== Cases ==
The first charge under the POO was taken after the handover was in 2000, when seven student leaders were arrested for joining "illegal assemblies" and obstructing the police on a demonstration on 26 June 2000 that was without a prior notice given to the police. The protest, served as a reminder of the Government's decision to seek for re-interpretation of the Basic Law after the right of abode rulings in 1999, received general public and media sympathy and was viewed by some as an orderly, non-violent and non-provoking act of civil disobedience. More than 500 academics and researchers signed a petition to support the students, about 1,000 people marched on the street without police's letter of no objection in open defiance of the POO, and the Hong Kong Bar Association condemned the police for singling out students for arrest. Due to large pressure from society, the Secretary for Justice Elsie Leung decided not to prosecute the student leaders and other protestors.

=== Leung Kwok-hung and Others v. HKSAR ===
The first case that the HKSAR government decide to prosecute protesters for violation of the notification system was launched on 9 May 2002 against veteran protestor Leung Kwok-hung of the April Fifth Action and two other student activists was charged with organising an unauthorised public assembly or assisting in organising one. On 10 February 2002, a number of persons gathered at Chater Garden for a procession. Civil activist Leung Kwok-hung was the organiser of the procession, but did not notify the Commissioner in advance. A police officer invited him to go through the statutory notification procedure, but Leung refused and was warned of the consequences. Initially, the procession consisted of 40 people, but it eventually grew to about 96 persons. They ignored police advice for several times, but the procession was at all times peaceful. On 25 November 2002, the three were convicted for organising an unauthorised public procession and for failing to notify the police under the POO. Each of them was fined 500 Hong Kong dollars and was required to be bound over for three months. Magistrate Partick Li held that requirement for the notification system was reasonable for maintaining ordre public of Hong Kong society. The appeal was heard before the Court of Final Appeal.

At the Court of Final Appeal, the constitutionality of the entire statutory notification scheme was challenged. On 8 July 2005, the Court of Final Appeal by a majority of 4 to 1 dismissed the appeal. Chief Justice Li, Justice Chan PJ, Justice Ribeiro PJ and Sir Anthony Mason NPJ, having considered all the statutory restrictions on the freedom of assembly and the statutory safeguards listed above, held that the notification system was constitutional. However, they held that the norm of "ordre public", which existed as a statutory legitimate purpose at that time, was too vague at statutory level and hence could not be said to be prescribed by law. "Ordre public" was as a result severed, but the term "public order" was sufficiently precise to survive. They also remarked in dicta that the norm of "protection of the rights and freedoms of others" was too wide and did not satisfy the legal certainty requirement. They affirmed the convictions as the severance did not affect the conviction. Justice Bokhary PJ dissented, noting in his judgment that the whole statutory scheme should be struck down except the entitlement to notification.

The government was criticised for politically motivated prosecute a few high-profile protesters as Leung Kwok-hung was the veteran activist and a leader of a radical political group and the student activists were the prominent members of the Hong Kong Federation of Students which is a vocal critic of government policy.

=== 2005 WTO conference ===
In the 2005 WTO conference, the Hong Kong Police referred to the POO to arrest nearly a thousand protesting South Korean farmers in Hong Kong, but afterwards but no one could successfully be convicted.

=== Recent cases ===
The HKSAR government recorded the number of prosecution under the POO in 2011. There were total of 45 protesters charged under the POO in 2011 compared with a total of just 39 since the handover. The 45 were among 444 protesters arrested were mostly in three massive protests. 54 prosecuted in total were police figures.

Two legislators from the radical political group People Power, Wong Yuk-man and Albert Chan were convicted under the POO for organising and taking part in an unlawful assembly in the evening after the 1 July Protest in 2011 where Wong urged hundreds of People Power supporters to vow to march to the Government House. Protesters ended up with a sit-down on Garden Road after the police blocked the way of the march. It brought a serve traffic disruption. Sentencing has been adjourned until 16 May.

On 8 May 2013, Melody Chan, a 26-year-old volunteer of the Occupy Central movement was arrested for her alleged involvement in the blocking of roads in Central nearly two years ago, the same protest that Wong Yuk-man and Albert Chan took part in and were charged much earlier.

=== 2016 Mong Kok unrest ===
In the 2016 Mong Kok civil unrest, the government prosecuted 36 protesters with the charge of rioting, a charge previously used only three times since 1970 which carried a maximum sentence of ten years' imprisonment under the POO. British human rights watchdog Hong Kong Watch criticised the charge of "rioting" and "incitement to riot" under the POO was vague and could lead to excessive punishment for protesters.

== Criticisms ==
The POO is criticized as a mean to suppress Hong Kong people's civil liberties.

The Reform Club of Hong Kong objected the legislation of the bill when it was first introduced in 1967. It stated the bill made every peace-loving resident of Hong Kong a potential criminal and made innocent persons who were charged with offences against it would 'be in grave danger of conviction, if they could not afford a lawyer and were undefended.

The system of letter of no objection has been criticised as a license system in disguise. If the police were to enforce the system strictly, there would large numbers of people would have to be prosecuted. However it would become a dead letter in the statute book and contrary to the rule of law principle if the law is not faithfully put into practice without discrimination.

== See also ==
- Hong Kong Basic Law Article 23
- Human rights in Hong Kong
- Macau national security law

== Bibliography ==
- Li, Pang-Kwong (1997). Political order and power transition in Hong Kong. Chinese University Press. ISBN 9622017835.
- Wong, Yiu-chung (2004). "One Country, Two Systems" in Crisis: Hong Kong's Transformation Since the Handover. Lexington Books. ISBN 0739104926.
