= Organic law =

Foundational law

An organic law is a law, or system of laws, that form the foundation of a government, corporation or any other organization's body of rules. A constitution is a particular form of organic law.

== By country ==
=== France ===
Under Article 46 of the Constitution of France, organic laws (in French, lois organiques; in English sometimes translated as Institutional Acts) are a short, fixed list of statutes (in 2005, there were about 30 of them) specified in the Constitution. They overrule ordinary statutes. They must be properly enacted by the Parliament of France following a special procedure and must be approved for constitutionality by the Constitutional Council of France before they can be promulgated.

Organic laws allow flexibility if needed. An important category of organic laws includes the budgets of the French state and French social security. Other organic laws give the practical procedures for various elections. Organic laws reduce the need for amendments to the constitution.

=== Hong Kong ===
The Basic Law of Hong Kong is a national law of China that serves as the organic law for the Hong Kong Special Administrative Region (HKSAR). Comprising nine chapters, 160 articles and three annexes, the Basic Law was composed to implement Annex I of the 1984 Sino-British Joint Declaration.

The Basic Law was enacted under the Constitution of China when it was adopted by the National People's Congress on 4 April 1990 and came into effect on 1 July 1997 when Hong Kong was transferred from the United Kingdom to China. It replaced Hong Kong's colonial constitution of the Letters Patent and the Royal Instructions.

The Basic Law lays out the basic policies of China on Hong Kong until 2047, including the "one country, two systems" principle, the sources of law, the relationship between Hong Kong and the Central Government (State Council), the fundamental rights and duties of Hong Kong residents and the branches of local government.

=== Spain ===
Under the current Spanish Constitution of 1978, an Organic Law has an intermediate status between that of an ordinary law and of the constitution itself. It must be passed by an absolute majority of the Congress of Deputies. The Spanish Constitution specifies that some areas of law must be regulated by this procedure, such as the laws developing fundamental rights and freedoms recognized in the first section of Chapter Two of Title I of the Constitution, as well as the laws that approve the Statutes of Autonomy of the autonomous communities of Spain, among others. Prior to the 1978 constitution, the concept did not exist in Spain, but it is inspired by the similar concept in the 1958 French Constitution.

=== United States ===
The organic laws of the United States of America can be found in Volume One of the United States Code which contains the general and permanent laws of the United States. The following texts are classified in the U.S. Code as organic laws: the Declaration of Independence, the Articles of Confederation, the Northwest Ordinance, and the US Constitution.

== See also ==
- Bangsamoro Organic Law
- Organic Law of the State, Spanish law of 1967
- Organic Laws of Oregon
- Organic Statute of the Kingdom of Poland
- Organic Statute of Macau (Estatuto Orgânico de Macau), a provisional constitution of Macau
- Organic statute, United States
- Regulamentul Organic, Wallachia (1831), Moldavia (1832)
- Règlement Organique (Mount Lebanon)
- Special law
