= Law of Hong Kong =

The law of Hong Kong has its foundation in the English common law system, inherited from being a former British colony and dependent territory. The primary legislation are enacted by the Legislative Council, usually known as "Ordinances", instead of "Acts". The published, consolidated copies of Ordinances are given chapter numbers in Laws of Hong Kong and in the official online database. Inherited from the common law system, another source of law is case law derived from precedent decisions.

Since the handover on 1 July 1997, Hong Kong's constitutional framework is provided by the Basic Law, a national law enacted by the Chinese National People's Congress (NPC). The principle of "one country, two systems" was enshrined in Article 5 of the Basic Law, preserving Hong Kong's capitalist system and way of life until at least 2047. However, Hong Kong's autonomy has increasingly been influenced by Beijing. The Standing Committee of the NPC's interpretations on the Basic Law have affected issues including residency rights, electoral reform, and the qualifications of legislators. The 2021 electoral reforms further strengthened Beijing's oversight by introducing candidate vetting requirements and restructuring the electoral system to ensure that only "patriots" could hold public office.

Some national laws on foreign affairs, the national emblem and flag, and national security apply directly in Hong Kong by virtue of stipulations in Article 18 and Annex III of the Basic Law. The enactment of the national security law in 2020 marked a significant change. Imposed directly under Annex III of the Basic Law, the law has been used to arrest and prosecute politicians, activists, journalists, and others accused of national security offences.

== History ==
Hong Kong's legal system was developed under British governance and is based on the English common law. Under British rule, the constitutional documents that governed Hong Kong were the Letters Patent and the Royal Instructions, both issued by the royal prerogative. Although prerogative legislation was formally enacted in the name of the British monarchs, it was typically promulgated by the Privy Council as the Orders in Council. The Letters Patent established the constitutional framework by defining the authority of the Executive Council, Legislative Council, and judiciary. They were the most fundamental, while the Royal Instructions supplemented them by regulating the operation of the executive and legislative branches. The Legislative Council could legislate only within the authority conferred by the Letters Patent, and ordinances inconsistent with it could be declared invalid by the courts.

In addition to prerogative legislation, certain laws applicable to Hong Kong were enacted by the UK Parliament through Acts of Parliament. Prior to the 1997 handover, around 300 UK Acts were applicable in Hong Kong, covering copyright, patent, maritime, and aviation. Judicial cases were generally appealable to the Judicial Committee of the Privy Council in London. Furthermore, elements of the Great Qing Legal Code were also retained as customary law to facilitate the transition to British rule, particularly in relation to Chinese marriage, inheritance, and land rights. These customary rules were gradually replaced over time. For example, the Marriage Reform (Amendment) Ordinance 1971 abolished the legal recognition of concubinage and the mui tsai system, while the New Territories Land (Exemption) Ordinance 1995 banned discrimination against women in inheritance rights.

In the 1984 Sino-British Joint Declaration, the UK and the PRC mutually agreed that Hong Kong would be returned to China on 1 July 1997. It also provided that, under the principle of "one country, two systems," Hong Kong's capitalist system, common law legal system and way of life would remain unchanged for 50 years until 2047. To give effect to the handover, the UK parliament enacted Hong Kong Act 1985, which provided that British sovereignty and jurisdiction over Hong Kong would cease on 1 July 1997. Consequently, the Colonial Laws Validity Act 1865 also ceased to apply. Since neither the Joint Declaration nor the Basic Law provided for the continued application of legislation enacted under the royal prerogative or Acts of the Parliament after the handover, the colonial government began the process of reviewing and localising laws since 1985. Approximately 150 Acts were subsequently incorporated into local law.

=== Basic law ===
In June 1985, National People's Congress established the Basic Law Drafting Committee to prepare the constitutional framework for Hong Kong's return. The Basic Law, enacted in accordance with Article 31 of the Chinese Constitution, is the constitutional document in Hong Kong. It defines Hong Kong's status as a Special Administrative Region (HKSAR), enshrines the principle of "one country, two systems," and sets out the powers and autonomy of the HKSAR. It preserves Hong Kong's common law system by maintaining pre-1997 laws, while also contains provisions that offer protection for human rights in Hong Kong.

According to the Basic Law, national laws apply directly in Hong Kong by virtue of stipulations in Article 18 and Annex III of the Basic Law. As of July 2026, 13 national laws are listed in Annex III, including laws relating to the national flag, national emblem, national anthem (2017), and the national security law (2020), which has been used to arrest and prosecute politicians, activists, journalists, and others accused of national security offences.

== Bilingualism ==
Hong Kong's legal system gradually evolved from being English-only to becoming bilingual in English and Chinese. Before 1974, English was the sole official language, and only English legislation had legal effect. Although the Official Languages Ordinance of 1974 recognized both English and Chinese as official languages for government communication, it did not apply to legislation or court proceedings. The Sino-British Joint Declaration provided for the basis for Chinese legislation. In 1986, the Royal Instructions amended to allow laws to be enacted in English or Chinese. It was followed by amendments to the Official Languages Ordinance and the Interpretation and General Clauses Ordinance in 1987. Meanwhile, older legislation was translated by the Department of Justice (DOJ) and given equal legal status after reviewed by the Bilingual Laws Advisory Committee (a similar body, Committee on the Bilingual Legal System, would form in 1998 after the handover) and published on the Government Gazette. The first bilingual ordinance to be enacted by the Legislative Council was the Securities and Futures Commission Ordinance, which was passed into law in April 1989. By 1997, most statutory laws had official Chinese versions. The judiciary also introduced reforms allowing Chinese to be used in court proceedings where appropriate.

As of 2025, over 80% of criminal cases in the Magistrates' Courts and District Court were heard in Chinese, as were nearly 90% of Magistracy Appeals heard by the High Court. However, Chinese remains less common in the High Court because legal bilingualism presents significant challenges, including the shortage of bilingual legal professionals, the complexity of multilingual court procedures, and the continued reliance on English-language common law precedents. In 2022, Stuart Hargreaves, an associate professor in the Faculty of Law of CUHK, reported that only about 25% of the substantive Court of Final Appeal judgments have been officially translated into Chinese since 1997.

== Legal areas ==
=== Administrative law ===
Administrative law in Hong Kong is heavily based on its counterpart in England and Wales, especially its principles and procedures of judicial review, though there is some divergence in various areas. Although its administrative tribunals share the same origins, they have seen little systematic reform over the past decades. The exercise of governmental and public powers is subject to both judicial and non-judicial oversight. Non-judicial oversight mechanisms include the Principal Officials Accountability System, the Code on Access to Information (公開資料守則), public consultations, statutory advisory bodies (e.g., District Councils), administrative tribunals (e.g., the Appeal Board on Public Meetings and Processions), independent complaint-handling bodies (e.g., the Office of the Ombudsman, Equal Opportunities Commission, and Office of the Privacy Commissioner for Personal Data), the Legislative Council, and the government's own internal oversight mechanisms.

A number of administrative laws have drawn criticism for violating human rights in Hong Kong. Most notably the colonial-era Public Order Ordinance (POO), a direct result of the 1967 riots, has been used to suppress the 2019 protests. According to Section 18(1) of POO, an "Unlawful Assembly" is defined broadly as "[w]hen 3 or more persons, assembled together, conduct themselves in a disorderly, intimidating, insulting or provocative manner [...]". The subsequent legal procedure and appeals were also accused of being weaponized by the Hong Kong government. Out of 20 appeals filed by DOJ, 13 converted non-custodial sentences into imprisonment, including ex-legislator Au Nok-hin, who received a nine-week prison for assault by speaking through a megaphone near an officer; five increased prison terms by at least three months; remaining two replaced protection orders with probation.

=== Contracts and obligations ===
Hong Kong contract law traditionally follows the common law principle of freedom of contract with limited judicial intervention against unfair terms. Although courts could imply terms based on public policy, express contractual clauses often limited such protection, leaving weaker parties vulnerable to harsh provisions. Statutory control of unfair contract terms developed relatively late. Following the Law Reform Commission's review in 1987, its recommendations were implemented in 1994 through the Supply of Services (Implied Terms) Ordinance (Cap. 457) and the Sale of Goods (Amendment) Ordinance 1994.

The Unconscionable Contracts Ordinance (Cap. 458) provides further protection by allowing courts to consider whether a contract is unconscionable. In Shum Kit Ching v Caesar Beauty Centre Ltd. (2003; HCSA 38/2002), the court held that unfairness should be assessed by examining the overall circumstances and bargaining process, rather than the contractual term alone. In Sinoearn International Ltd v Hyundai-CCECC Joint Venture (2013; FACV 22/2012), the Court of Final Appeal drew on case law from across various common law jurisdictions and confirmed that the courts can interpret contracts using "commercial common sense", but cannot "construct" a contract to accommodate the profit or other expectations of any of the parties to the contract.

=== Family law ===
Family law in Hong Kong is heavily modelled on its counterpart in England and Wales with important modifications.

==== Ancillary relief ====
Hong Kong does not have a statutory matrimonial property regime. There is no system of "community of property" and property rights are not in principle affected by marriage. Instead, the family courts have very broad discretion to make a range of financial orders upon a decree of divorce pursuant to the "Matrimonial Proceedings and Property Ordinance (Cap 192)", namely for: periodical payments, secured periodical payments, lump sum payments, transfers or sale of property, settlement of property (into a trust), and variation of settlements. Similarly, there are powers to make orders for maintenance pending suit once divorce proceedings have begun. These are interim measures that will end once the final divorce decree is granted. In making final financial orders in favour of a spouse, courts are guided by four principles: (i) the objective of fairness, (ii) rejection of discrimination, (iii) the yardstick of equal division, and (iv) rejection of minute retrospective investigation (see "LKW v DD" [2010] HKCFA 70; [2010] 6 HKC 528). They are also required to consider the following non-exhaustive list of factors (see section 7(1) of the Matrimonial Proceedings and Property Ordinance (Cap 192).

==== Child custody ====
The family courts have broad jurisdiction to deal with the welfare of children under the provisions of the "Guardianship of Minors Ordinance (Cap 13)", the "Separation and Maintenance Orders Ordinance (Cap 16)", the "Matrimonial Causes Ordinance (Cap 179)" and the "Matrimonial Proceedings and Property Ordinance (Cap 192)". Additionally, the High Court's has broad powers under its inherent jurisdiction including wardship. In parental disputes, generally the courts are concerned with making orders for custody, care and control, and access. These orders are distinct from questions of financial responsibility for children (i.e. "maintenance"). Access is the right to have contact with the child, it may be unsupervised or supervised (i.e. where there are concerns about the impact of contact on the child); undefined (sometimes "reasonable" or "generous") or defined (i.e. at times specified in the order); staying (a.k.a. overnight) or "day-time". Care and control is the right to make day-to-day decisions about the child; it should not be confused with "shared care" and the notion of the primary caregiver. Custody is the right to make all important decisions affecting the child and it is generally awarded to one parent ("sole custody") or shared between both parents ("joint custody"): see "PD v KWW (Joint Custody, Care and Control)" [2010] 4 HKLRD 191; [2010] HKCA 172.

The paramount consideration for the court is always the welfare (or "best interests") of the child; this is known as the Welfare Principle (see section 3 of Cap 13). In determining the best interests of the child, the court will generally have regard to the Welfare Checklist, i.e. the ascertainable wishes and feelings of the child concerned (considered in the light of the child's age and understanding); the physical, emotional and educational needs of the child; the likely effect on the child of any change in the child's circumstances; the child's age, sex, background and any characteristics of the child's which the court considers relevant; any harm the child has suffered or is at risk of suffering; how capable each of the parents, and any other person in relation to whom the court considers the question to be relevant, is of meeting the child's needs; the range of powers available to the court in the proceedings in question; and the general principle that any delay is likely to prejudice the welfare of the child: see "H v N [2012] 5 HKLRD 498; [2012] HKCFI 1533".

==== Divorce ====
The jurisdiction of the family courts to deal with divorce, separation and nullity of marriage is set out in the "Separation and Maintenance Orders Ordinance (Cap 16)" and the "Matrimonial Causes Ordinance (Cap 179)".

=== Business associations ===
==== Companies Registry ====
The Companies Registry (公司註冊處) is responsible for administering and enforcing the Companies Ordinance and several other related ordinances. Its primary functions include the incorporation of local companies; the registration of oversea companies; the registration of documents required to be submitted by registered companies; the deregistration of defunct, solvent private companies; the prosecution of companies and their officers for breaches of the various regulatory provisions of the Companies Ordinance; the provision of facilities to inspect and obtain company information; and advising the Government on policy and legislative issues regarding company law and related legislation, including the Overall Review of the Companies Ordinance.

==== Official Receiver's Office ====
When appointed by the court and creditors, the Official Receiver (破產管理署) is responsible for the proper and orderly administration of the estates of insolvent companies ordered to be wound up by the court under the winding-up provisions of the Companies Ordinance and of individuals or partners declared bankrupt by the court under the Bankruptcy Ordinance.

=== Property law ===
==== Land law ====
The Land Registry (土地註冊處) administers the Land Registration Ordinance governing the system of land registration and provides facilities for search of the Land Register and related records by the public and government departments. It has responsibility for the registration of owners corporations under the Building Management Ordinance.

The Legal Advisory and Conveyancing Office (LACO, 法律諮詢及田土轉易處) is part of the Lands Department. It provides legal advice primarily to the Lands Administration Office of the Lands Department and other government departments on land related matters and ordinances. LACO is responsible for drafting and settling government land disposal and lease modification documents. LACO is also responsible for the preparation of documentation relating to the acquisition of land from private owners pursuant to statutory powers and the payment of compensation to those owners. LACO administers the Lands Department Consent Scheme to approve applications by developers to sell flats in uncompleted developments. It also approves Deeds of Mutual Covenant requiring approval under land leases. LACO also provides conveyancing services to the Financial Secretary Incorporated for the extension of non-renewable leases, the Government Property Agency for the sale and purchase of government properties and the Secretary for Home Affairs Incorporated for the purchase of accommodation for welfare purposes in private developments. It handles applications for the apportionment of premium and government rents under the Government Rent and Premium (Apportionment) Ordinance. In addition, it is responsible for the recovery of arrears of government rents other than rents under the Government Rent (Assessment and Collection) Ordinance.

==== Intellectual property law ====
The Intellectual Property Department (知識產權署) serves as the focal point for intellectual property policy, law and acquisition and public education on intellectual property protection. It provides expert policy advice to the Commerce, Industry and Technology Bureau and legal advice to other government departments on intellectual property. It comments on draft intellectual property bills. It operates the registries of trade marks, patents and designs. It is also responsible for registration of copyright licensing bodies.

- Hong Kong copyright law
- Hong Kong trade mark law
- Patent law in Hong Kong

=== International law ===
Under the Basic Law, the HKSAR has a high degree of autonomy in external affairs. With the authority of the Central People's Government where necessary, it has concluded more than a hundred bilateral agreements with other jurisdictions. In addition, over 200 multilateral international conventions are applicable to the HKSAR. Using the name "Hong Kong, China", the HKSAR also participates on its own as a full member in international organisations and conferences not limited to states, e.g. the World Trade Organization, the World Customs Organization, the Asia-Pacific Economic Cooperation, etc. As part of the delegation of the People's Republic of China, representatives of the HKSAR Government participate in activities of the Hague Conference, as well as of other international organisations and conferences limited to states, such as the International Monetary Fund, the World Intellectual Property Organization and the International Civil Aviation Organization.

== Institutions ==
=== Judiciary ===
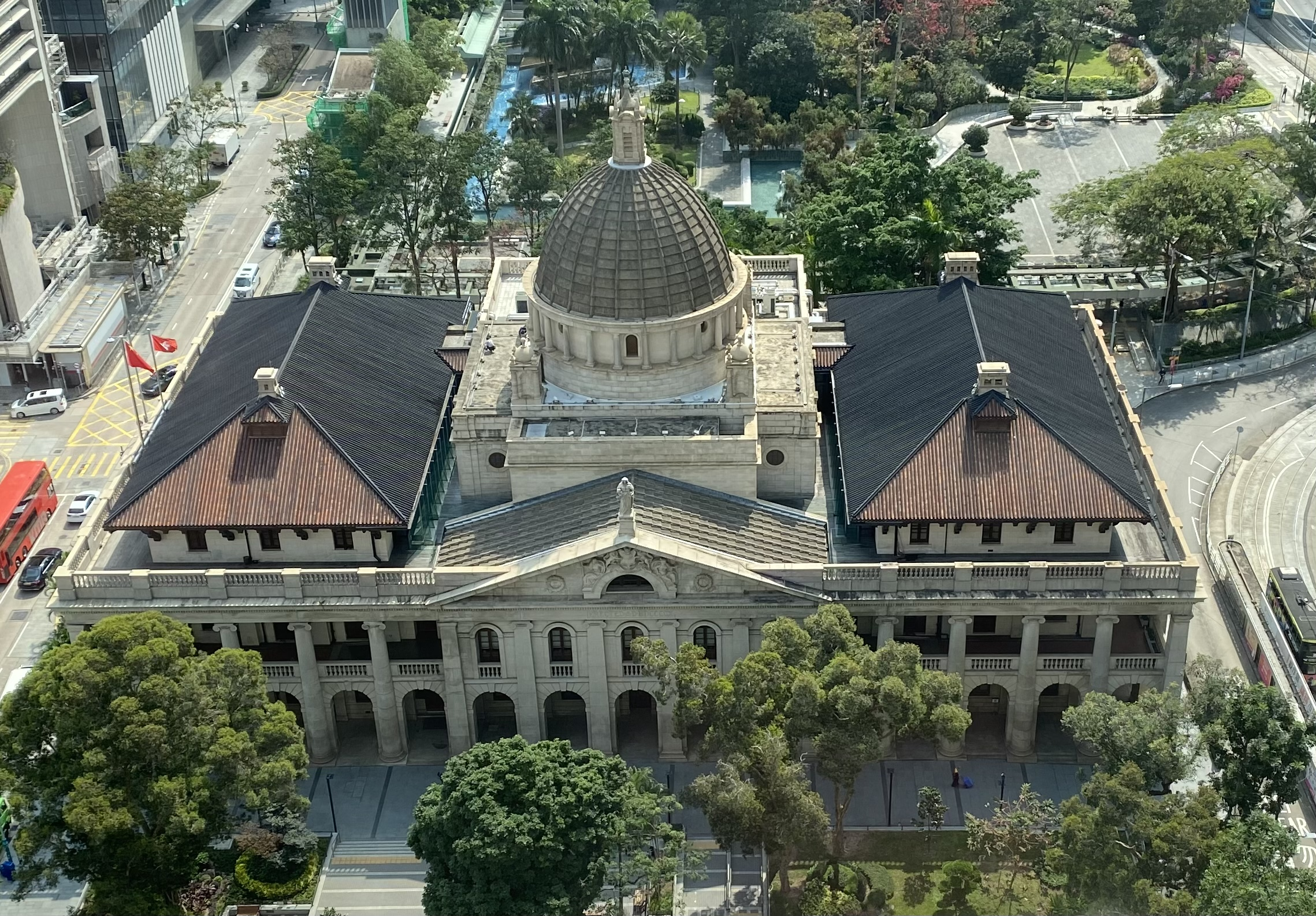
The Hong Kong Court of Final Appeal

It is fundamental to Hong Kong's legal system that members of the judiciary are independent of the executive and legislative branches of government. The courts of justice in Hong Kong are the Court of Final Appeal, the High Court (which includes the Court of Appeal and the Court of First Instance), the District Court (which includes the Family Court), the Lands Tribunal, the Magistrates' Court (which include the Juvenile Court), the Coroner's Court, the Labour Tribunal, the Small Claims Tribunal and the Obscene Articles Tribunal.

=== Department of Justice ===
The Department of Justice (DOJ) It consists of five professional divisions responsible for legal work. It is headed by the Secretary for Justice, who is a member of the Executive Council and is the Government's chief legal adviser. He has ultimate responsibility for the prosecution of all offences in the HKSAR.

- The Legal Policy Division, as well as the Secretary for Justice's Office, provides professional support to the Secretary for Justice in the execution of her duties and provides input on all legal policy issues being considered by the Government. The division advises on issues relating to the administration of justice, the legal system, the legal profession, human rights, the Basic Law and the law of Mainland China. The Law Reform Commission Secretariat, which provides research and secretarial support to The Law Reform Commission of Hong Kong, is within the division.
- The Civil Division provides legal advice to the Government on civil law, drafts commercial contracts and franchises and conducts civil litigation, arbitration and mediation on behalf of the Government.
- The Law Drafting Division is responsible for drafting all legislation, including subsidiary legislation, in Chinese and English, and assists in steering legislation through the Executive and Legislative Councils. It also has editorial responsibility for the Laws of Hong Kong and for maintaining an up-to-date version of those laws in the Bilingual Laws Information System, a computer database which is available free to the public on the Internet.
- The Prosecutions Division, headed by the Director of Public Prosecution, prosecutes trials and appeals on behalf of the HKSAR and generally exercises the Secretary for Justice's discretion whether or not to bring criminal proceedings against a person. It conducts most criminal appeals up to and including the Court of Final Appeal. It also conduct the majority of trials in the Court of First Instance and the District Court and, when necessary, it prosecutes in the Magistrates’ Court. The division also provides legal advice to law enforcement agencies and other government departments on the criminal law aspects of any proposed legislation.
- The International Law Division advises the Government on issues relating to public international law. Lawyers in this division also participate in the negotiation of agreements with other jurisdictions and handle requests to and from the HKSAR for international legal co-operation.

=== Law Reform Commission ===
The Law Reform Commission considers and reports on such topics as may be referred to it by the Secretary for Justice or the Chief Justice of the Court of Final Appeal. Its membership includes academics, practising lawyers and prominent community members. The commission has published reports covering subjects as diverse as commercial arbitration, data protection, divorce, sale of goods and supply of services, insolvency, fraud and statutory interpretation. The recommendations in many of its reports have been implemented, either in whole or in part. It is currently considering references on privacy, guardianship and custody, domicile, privity of contract, advance directives, hearsay in criminal proceedings and conditional fees. Its predecessor was the Law Reform Committee, which was appointed on 16 March 1956.

== Legal professions ==
Hong Kong follows the English common law tradition by maintaining a split legal profession of solicitors and barristers, with neither branch being superior to the other. Solicitors provide general legal services, including property, commercial, family, and corporate matters, and prepare litigation by advising clients and drafting legal documents. They generally represent clients in the lower courts, while members of the public usually consult a solicitor first. Barristers specialize in advocacy and litigation, representing clients at all court levels, preparing pleadings, and giving legal opinions. They are generally instructed through solicitors rather than directly by clients, ensuring appropriate case allocation and preserving their independence. Unlike solicitors, barristers practise independently in chambers rather than in law firms.

Hong Kong has long been an open legal services market. By contrast, mainland China only formally opened its legal services market to foreign law firms on 1 July 1992, when the Ministry of Justice issued the Provisional Regulation on the Establishment of Offices by Foreign Law Firms, allowing foreign law firms to establish representative offices in China.

As of November 2025, there were 11,938 practising solicitors and 929 local law firms, plus some 87 foreign law firms, with 1,653 registered foreign lawyers from 31 jurisdictions. There were also 109 Senior Counsel and 1,665 Junior Counsel, in total 1,774 barristers in 155 chambers as of 2025.

=== Qualification and practice ===
Both solicitors and barristers are regulated under the Legal Practitioners Ordinance. To qualify as either a solicitor or barrister, candidates must complete the Postgraduate Certificate in Laws (PCLL) at the University of Hong Kong, the Chinese University of Hong Kong, or the City University of Hong Kong. To become solicitor, a candidate must complete a two-year traineeship in a law firm before applying to court and the Law Society for admission; for barrister, a candidate must undertake a one-year pupillage under a barrister with at least five years' standing before applying to the Bar Association for a practising certificate. Solicitors may eventually establish their own firms after gaining 2 years of experience, whereas barristers must continue practising independently in chambers.

Hong Kong also recognizes distinguished advocates through the title of Senior Counsel (SC), formerly known as Queen's Counsel (QC) before the 1997 handover. Senior Counsel are appointed by the Chief Justice and usually handle the most complex and significant cases. Since 1995, it has no longer been mandatory to instruct a junior barrister whenever a Senior Counsel is retained.

== Legal aid ==
Legal aid is designed to uphold the principle of "equality before the law" by ensuring that individuals who cannot afford legal representation are still able to protect their legal rights. In Hong Kong, legal aid is provided through three main channels: the Legal Aid Department (LAD), the Duty Lawyer Service (當值律師服務) jointly operated by the Law Society and the Bar Association, and various legal services, including limited legal advice offered by legislators, pro bono services from Bar Association, university legal clinics, the Consumer Council, and the Equal Opportunities Commission. Unlike the government-funded LAD and Duty Lawyer Service, other legal aid services are generally limited in scope. While some, such as legislators and university legal clinics (e.g., Free Legal Advice Scheme on HKU Campus (Note: Operated at least since 2014, their service is funded by the Duty Lawyer Service, but very limited. Only a small number of cases are accepted, primarily for educational purposes.)), are mostly voluntary. Pro bono services from Bar Association are generally provided only in exceptionally rare circumstances or at the invitation of the court. And the Consumer Council and Equal Opportunities Commission provides limited legal advice on matters only within its authority.

=== Legal Aid Department (LAD) ===
The LAD is the primary provider of legal aid in Hong Kong, representing eligible applicants in civil and criminal proceedings. Applicants must generally satisfy both a 'means test' and a 'merits test'. Financial eligibility under the means test is assessed in accordance with the Legal Aid (Assessment of Resources and Contributions) Regulations (Cap. 91B), determined primarily by the applicant's financial resources after deducting essential living expenses. Applicants generally contribute towards costs, with the amount determined by their financial resources and capped at 25% of their resources. In exceptional cases involving the Hong Kong Bill of Rights, the Director of Legal Aid may exercise discretion to grant legal aid despite applicants exceeding the normal financial limits. While applicants must demonstrate a reasonable claim or defence, applicants dissatisfied with Director's decisions may appeal to the Registrar of the High Court within 14 days.

Civil legal aid is available for proceedings in the District Court, Court of First Instance, Court of Appeal, Court of Final Appeal, certain Coroner's Court, and Mental Health Review Tribunal proceedings. Applicants must satisfy both the 'means test' and 'merits test'. For the means test, a person whose total financial resources do not exceed $452,320 may be granted legal aid as of July 2026. Whereas, criminal legal aid must generally be granted for proceedings in the Court of First Instance as long as the applicant satisfies the means test. For criminal appeals, the Legal Aid Department considers both the applicant’s financial eligibility and whether there are sufficient grounds for pursuing the appeal. However, in appeals against a murder conviction, legal aid must be provided if the applicant satisfies the means test.

In addition, Supplementary Legal Aid Scheme (法律援助輔助計劃) extends assistance to the sandwich class whose financial resources are above the upper eligibility limit for legal aid (i.e. $452,320) but do not exceed $2,261,600 as of July 2026. Owing to a 1994 judicial review, the Legal Aid Services Council was formed in mid-1996 and is responsible for overseeing the operation of LAD. The council recommended in 1998 that the LAD should gradually become independent from the government, following an independent consultancy study, but the proposal was never accepted.

=== Duty Lawyer Service ===
Three programmes of legal assistance, jointly administered by the Law Society and the Bar Association of Hong Kong, are subvented by the Government. The Duty Lawyer Scheme rosters barristers and solicitors in private practice to appear in the Magistrates and Juvenile Courts on a remunerated basis. The scheme provides representation to all juveniles (defendants under 16) and to most adult defendants charged in the Magistrates' Courts who cannot afford private representation. The defendants are required to pay a handling charge of $570 upon granting of Duty Lawyer representation. In 2018, 22,546 defendants were assisted. The Free Legal Advice Scheme, staffed by over 1,126 volunteer lawyers, operates 12 sessions per week at nine evening centres. In 2018, 6,953 cases were handled. The scheme is not means tested. A free Tel-Law Service offers trilingual (Cantonese, Mandarin and English) taped information on 80 topics. Eight telephone lines operate 24 hours. In 2018, 16,439 calls were received.

== See also ==
- Legal systems of the world
- Law of the People's Republic of China
- Legal system of Macao
