= Article 69 =

Clause of the Hong Kong Basic Law

Article 69 is an article in the Hong Kong Basic Law. The article sets the term of the Legislative Council of Hong Kong (LegCo).

== Content ==
Article 69 states that:

The term of office of the Legislative Council of the Hong Kong Special Administrative Region shall be four years, except the first term which shall be two years.

== Application ==
The Article sets forth intervals of LegCo elections in the Hong Kong Special Administration Region (HKSAR); the first and second LegCo elections were held on a two-year interval. Subsequent elections were to be held on a four-year interval. The drafting intention of the four-year term of office of the Legislative Council was that it must be different from the term of the Chief Executive, so that there would not be excessive campaigning within the same year.

In accordance with Article 69, the First Legislative Council of the HKSAR was in office for two years and three months (from 1 July 1998 to 30 September 2000). Subsequent Councils, with the exception of the Sixth Legislative Council of the HKSAR, have served terms numbering precisely four years. All LegCo members, returned from geographical and functional constituencies or the Election Committee, hold the same terms.

The beginning and end of ordinary sessions of LegCo each year is published by the Chief Executive in the Hong Kong Government Gazette. From 1999 through 2020, each ordinary session starts in October and ends in July.

== Emergency Sessions of LegCo ==
Notwithstanding Article 69 of the Basic Law, the Chief Executive can request the President of LegCo to convene an emergency session of LegCo after the end of a LegCo term under section 11 of the Legislative Council Ordinance (Cap. 542).

=== Special Sittings in the Pre-1997 LegCo ===
The power to convene special sittings for urgent business after the end of LegCo sessions was first created under the amendment to the Hong Kong Royal Instructions on 30 March 1985. In conjunction with Hong Kong's first Legislative Council election in 1985, Article XXIA was added to the Royal Instructions concerning sessions and sittings of the Legislative Council. Section 2 of Article XXIA empowered the Governor of Hong Kong to summon special sittings of the Legislative Council between LegCo sessions. Subsequently, the Legislative Council amended its Standing Orders in July 1988 to provide for sittings for urgent business under Section 7B.

In effect, Section 7B of the Standing Orders empowered the Legislative Council to hold meetings after a LegCo term ends for debates and votes on Government budgets and appropriation bills. Former Chief Secretary Sir David Ford stated in a LegCo Council meeting that:

"[U]nder the Royal Instructions, the Governor has power to convene a sitting of the Council for consideration of urgent business after a dissolution. In such an emergency situation, Sir, it is possible to envisage circumstances when the Finance Committee might indeed be recalled."

— Chief Secretary Sir David Ford, Hansard of the Legislative Council of Hong Kong

=== Emergency Sessions in the Post-1997 LegCo ===
The Hong Kong Royal Instructions and Standing Orders of LegCo were nullified after the transfer of sovereignty in 1997. The power to convene emergency sessions under the Royal Instructions was retained in the new Legislative Council Ordinance (Cap. 542) enacted by the Provisional Legislative Council. Before its second reading, a Committee stage amendment was put forth to the Legislative Council bill which empowered the Chief Executive to request the President of LegCo to convene emergency sessions after the end of a LegCo term.

Emergency sessions of LegCo were considered constitutional despite the lack of corresponding Basic Law provisions. The LegCo Committee on Rules of Procedure considered that the power to convene emergency sessions was solely for the purpose to convene LegCo meetings after the council is dissolved but before the general election takes place. Section 11 of the Legislative Council Ordinance (Cap. 542) is not intended to extend the term of office of LegCo members.

== Term Extension of the Sixth LegCo ==
On 11 August 2020, the Standing Committee of the National People’s Congress (NPCSC) passed a decision on extending the term of the Sixth Legislative Council of the HKSAR for one year in order to fill the lacuna in LegCo after the Chief Executive-in-council invoked its power in the Emergency Regulations Ordinance and postponed the 2020 Hong Kong legislative election for one year. The NPCSC decision stipulated that subsequent terms of offices of LegCo remain to be four years.

== See also ==
- Hong Kong Basic Law
- Legislative Council of Hong Kong
