= Hong Kong Royal Instructions 1917 =

- Coat of arms of Hong Kong (1959-1997)

Overview
- Jurisdiction: British Hong Kong
- Subordinate to: Hong Kong Letters Patent 1917
- Created: 1917
- System: Crown colony (1841-1981) Dependent territory (1981-1997)
- Head of state: Monarchy of the United Kingdom
- Chambers: Legislative Council of Hong Kong
- Executive: Governor of Hong Kong

History
- First legislature: 26 June 1843; 182 years ago
- First executive: 26 June 1843; 182 years ago
- Amendments: 22
- Last amended: 1993
- Author: George V
- Supersedes: Hong Kong Royal Instructions of 1888
- Superseded by: Hong Kong Basic Law

Full text
- Hong Kong Royal Instructions 1917 at Wikisource

The Hong Kong Royal Instructions 1917 was one of the principal constitutional instruments of Hong Kong when it was a British Crown colony and dependent territory; the other principal constitutional instruments were the Hong Kong Letters Patent 1917, the Hong Kong Letters Patent 1960, the Hong Kong Letters Patent 1982, and the Hong Kong Letters Patent 1991 (No. 1). The Hong Kong Royal Instructions 1917 has been amended many times since its coming into force by instruments titled 'Hong Kong Additional Instructions [year]'.

The Hong Kong Royal Instructions 1917 superseded the royal instructions issued on 6 April 1843, all additional instructions amending the 1843 royal instructions, the 1888 royal instructions (replacing the 1843 royal instructions and all additional instructions amending the 1843 royal instructions), and all additional instructions amending the 1888 royal instructions. The royal instructions issued on 14 February 1917, as amended from time to time, formed part of the basis for Hong Kong's system of government until the transfer of the territory's sovereignty on 1 July 1997 to the People's Republic of China.

Issued under the royal prerogative, and subordinated to the Hong Kong Letters Patent 1917, the Hong Kong Royal Instructions 1917 set out such matters as the constitution of the Executive Council and the Legislative Council, and in particular made provision for the latter's procedures, and for the enactment of laws.

After the transfer of sovereignty to China, the Hong Kong Royal Instructions 1917 ceased to have legal effect, being superseded by the new Basic Law.

== See also ==
- Hong Kong Royal Instructions (see this article for a list of all Hong Kong Royal Instructions and Hong Kong Additional Instructions)
- Royal instructions
- Hong Kong Letters Patent 1917
- Hong Kong Letters Patent (see this article for a list of all Hong Kong Letters Patent)
- History of Hong Kong
- British Hong Kong
- Organic Statue of Macau, the Portuguese Macau equivalent
