= Hong Kong–Macau cultural exchange =

The Hong Kong–Macau cultural exchange was a trip that took place on the Sunday morning of March 15, 2009. The goal was to have Pan-democracy camp members test the newly enacted Macau national security law by going from Hong Kong to Macau to see who would be banned.

== Summary ==
Macau national security law was enacted and took in effect on March 3, 2009. Since then decision have been made to bar a handful of Hong Kong politicians, academics and a photographer. This has underscored the cultural and political gaps between the two former colonies, which now both belong to the People's Republic of China after 1997 for HK and 1999 for Macau. One of the high point was when University of Hong Kong dean of law Johannes Chan was banned from Macau in February 2009. Macau casino tycoon Stanley Ho called the democrats "troublemakers stirring shit up". Democrat Lee Cheuk-yan had fought back the comment saying Stanley Ho was "old and confused".

== Exchange trip ==
=== Preparation ===
A total of 33 Pan-democracy camp members got together to cross the Hong Kong Macau border starting at 9am from the Kowloon Peninsula. Antonio Ng and the New Democratic Macau Association picked up the democrats at Macau ferry terminal, followed by a 3-hour seminar that discuss how Macau's politics and economic conditions had changed since the security law came into effect. The trip from Hong Kong to Macau is a 45-minute ferry ride.

=== Denied ===
At the Macau entrance, 5 members were banned from entering. Among those turned down were League of Social Democrats member Lee Cheuk-yan, Leung Kwok-hung (Long Hair), activist Tsang Kin-shing, Koo Sze-yiu and Lui Yuk-lin. Leung Kwok-hung said that "Macau's internal security laws target triads and terrorists, and I am definitely not one of them. I wish the government would defend the dignity of the Hong Kong people."

=== Allowed ===
Some of the more public democrats allowed include democratic legislators Lee Wing-tat, Albert Ho, Kam Nai-wai, Cheung Man-kwong and Emily Lau. After entry, they staged a protest in Macau for their fellow democrats. Ivan Choy Chi-keung, a political scientist at Chinese University, said the Macau authorities had reduced the number of people denied entry to pacify Hong Kong and to give Donald Tsang face.

== See also ==
- Hong Kong Basic Law Article 23
- Liza Wang#Pan-democrat home return permits request
- Macau Basic Law
