= Macao Basic Law =

Constitutional document of Macau

Basic Law of the Macao Special Administrative Region of the People's Republic of China

Overview
- Jurisdiction: Macau
- Subordinate to: Constitution of China
- Created: 31 March 1993
- Date effective: 20 December 1999
- Signatories: Jiang Zemin, President of China

Macao Basic Law

Chinese name
- Traditional Chinese: 中華人民共和國澳門特別行政區基本法
- Simplified Chinese: 中华人民共和国澳门特别行政区基本法
Transcriptions
Standard Mandarin
- Hanyu Pinyin: Zhōnghuá Rénmín Gònghéguó Àomén Tèbiéxíngzhèngqū Jīběnfǎ
Yue: Cantonese
- Jyutping: zung1 waa4 jan4 man4 gung6 wo4 gwok3 ou3 mun4*2 dak6 bit6 hang4 zing3 keoi1 gei1 bun2 faat3

Portuguese name
- Portuguese: Lei Básica da Região Administrativa Especial de Macau da República Popular da China

The Basic Law of the Macao Special Administrative Region of the People's Republic of China (Chinese: 中華人民共和國澳門特別行政區基本法, Portuguese: Lei Básica da Região Administrativa Especial de Macau da República Popular da China) is the organic law that establishes the Macau Special Administrative Region, replacing the Organic Statute of Macau. It was adopted on 31 March 1993 by China's National People's Congress and promulgated by President Jiang Zemin; it came into effect on 20 December 1999, following the handover of Macau from Portugal to China.

Under the law's basic principle of "one country, two systems", the socialist system and policies of China are excluded from Macau. Instead, Macau will continue its capitalist system and way of life from before 1999 for at least 50 years in 2049. As an organic law, the Basic Law also describes sources of law, the branches of government, the relationship between Macau and the Chinese Central People's Government (State Council), and the fundamental rights and duties of Macau residents.

== Overview ==
In accordance with Article 31 of the Constitution of China, Macau has special administrative region status, which provides constitutional guarantees for implementing the policy of "one country, two systems" and the constitutional basis for enacting the Basic Law of the Macau Special Administrative Region. The Macau Special Administrative Region is directly under the authority of the central government of China in Beijing, which controls the foreign policy and defense of Macau but otherwise grants the region a "high degree of autonomy."

== Structure ==
- Preamble
- Chapter I: General Principles
- Chapter II: Relationship between the Central Authorities and the Macao Special Administrative Region
- Chapter III: Fundamental Rights and Duties of the Residents
- Chapter IV Political Structure
  - Section 1: The Chief Executive
  - Section 2: The Executive Authorities
  - Section 3: The Legislature
  - Section 4: The Judiciary
  - Section 5: Municipal Organs
  - Section 6: Public Servants
  - Section 7: Swearing Allegiance
- Chapter V: Economy
- Chapter VI: Culture and Social Affairs
- Chapter VII: External Affairs
- Chapter VIII: Interpretation and Amendment of the Basic Law
- Chapter IX: Supplementary Provisions
- Annex I: Method for the Selection of the Chief Executive of the Macao Special Administrative Region
- Annex II: Method for the Formation of the Legislative Council of the Macao Special Administrative Region
- Annex III: National Laws to Be Applied in the Macao Special Administrative Region

== Amendment ==
Article 144 sets out the amendment process, similar to the Basic Law of Hong Kong, and gives the National People's Congress the sole power to amend it. Amendments can be proposed by either the Standing Committee of the National People's Congress, the State Council, or Macau. For Macau to propose amendments, the amendments first need the consent of two-thirds of the deputies of Macau to the National People's Congress, two-thirds of all the members of the Legislative Assembly and the Chief Executive. All proposals needs to be reviewed by the Committee for the Basic Law of the Macau Special Administrative Region, and no amendments can "contravene the established basic policies of the People's Republic of China regarding Macau".

=== Annexes I and II ===
According to Annexes I and II of the Basic Law, amendments could be made to the methods for selecting the chief executive and forming the Legislative Council for the terms subsequent to the year 2009 with the endorsement of a two-thirds majority of all the members of the Legislative Assembly and the consent of the Chief Executive. Amendments should then be reported to the NPCSC for approval. The method of amendment is similar to the Annexes I and II of the Basic Law of Hong Kong pre-2021.

== See also ==
- Basic law
- Hong Kong Basic Law
- Macau national security law
