= Royal instructions =

Royal instructions are formal instructions issued to governors of the United Kingdom's colonial dependencies. past instructions can be of continuing constitutional significance in a former colonial dependency or Dominion.

== Content ==
Traditionally the royal instructions were issued to a governor to:

- tell him how the Executive Council and legislative council were to be constituted, how their procedure was to be regulated, and how he was to work with them
- set out how legislation was to be framed
- instruct him as to which classes of legislation he must refuse or withhold ("for the queen's pleasure") his assent
- regulate precedence
- set out how copies of certain formal documents and records were to be communicated to the British government.

They were essentially a type of constitutional or basic law in the way they functioned to regulate the process and power of government locally.

== Legal status ==
Royal instructions were a commonly used legal instrument of British imperial law used in the governing of the empire's colonies. Royal instructions delegated to colonial governors the legal capacity to exercise the Crown's royal prerogative and set out the limits and conditions within which that prerogative was to be exercised.

The royal instructions given to a colonial governor were one of three documents normally used for constituting the government of a colony, the others being the letters patent or order in council constituting the office of governor and commander-in-chief, and the governor's commission obliging him to follow the instructions he received from the Privy Council in London. As explained in the book, Royal Government in America, it is "The British authorities clearly looked upon the instructions as constitutional documents of the greatest importance which all members of the colonial government were expected to obey." For example, when, in the late 1750s, the Governor of Virginia approved three Acts in contravention of regulations incorporated into his royal instructions, the Privy Council struck down the Acts and admonished the Governor, reminding him that his instructions in this regard were "coeval with the Constitution of the British Colonies" and formed "an Essential part of that Constitution and cannot be sett aside a without subverting Fundimental Principle of it."

As at 1945 there were eight legislative councils which had been constituted by royal instructions: in the Falkland Islands, the Gambia, Hong Kong, Kenya, Nyasaland, Seychelles, the Straits Settlements and Uganda; while others had been constituted by order in council, letters patent, local ordinance or by act of the imperial parliament at Westminster.

== Continuing importance in Canada ==
With Confederation, Canada inherited a Constitution "similar in Principle to that of the United Kingdom". Thus, those elements of the constitution of the provinces of Canada that were not displaced by the Constitution Act, 1867 or subsequent legislation continue in force in the country. At the time of Confederation and still to this day, certain subjects matters remain within the scope of the Crown's prerogative powers, such as international treaty making and the creation of Indian reserves. However, the limits on those powers and the guidelines for their use that were set out in the instructions to the governors of Canada's constituent colonies were incorporated into Canada's constitution and, unless displaced, bind the actions of the Crown in Right of Canada.

The continued importance of Royal Instructions can has been noted by the Supreme Court of Canada. The Supreme Court of Canada's decision in St. Catherines Milling (1888), stated that the Royal Proclamation of 1763 must be read "together with the Royal instructions given to the Governors as to its strict enforcement" and that, when taken together, these constitute "the Indian Bill of Rights". Numerous decisions of the Supreme Court of Canada refer to Royal Instructions given to colonial governors, without necessarily analysing their legal status.

== Canada after Confederation ==
Initially the form of royal instructions remained essentially unchanged after the development of responsible government. Detailed criticism in 1876 by Edward Blake (Canada's federal Minister of Justice)—of the wording of both the letters patent appointing the Governor General of Canada and the royal instructions issued to him—led to changes to both sets of instruments for each of the dominions, to better reflect how they were actually governed.

== See also ==
- Campbell v Hall
- Hong Kong Royal Instructions 1917
- Hong Kong Royal Instructions
