= Legislative council =

Type of legislative body

A legislative council is the legislature, or one of the legislative chambers, of a nation, colony, or subnational division such as a province or state. It was commonly used to label unicameral or upper house legislative bodies in the British (former) colonies. However, it has also been used as designation in other (non-Commonwealth) nations. A member of a legislative council is commonly referred to as an MLC and may use those letters as a post-nominal.

A legislative council was generally the first legislative body of a British colony, with members who were all appointed by the viceregal representative (who also presided over the council). Gradually, with the passage of time and increasing levels of self-governance, legislative councils were supplemented by a lower, elected chamber (often called a legislative assembly or house of assembly). This resulted in either the abolition of the council to form a unicameral and wholly elected legislature (as was done in Southern Rhodesia in 1923, Ceylon in 1931, New Zealand in 1951, and Singapore in 1955) or the democratisation of and a gradual decrease in powers exercised by the council, as done in India in 1919 and in some Australian states throughout the twentieth century.

In the United States, a legislative council has a different connotation, and means a council within a legislature which supervises nonpartisan support staff.

== History ==
In the British Empire, the authority under which legislative councils have been constituted has varied: some under the royal prerogative, others by acts of parliament (that is, the Parliament at Westminster), and some by commission and royal instructions.

== List of legislative councils ==
Existing national legislative councils
Country	Body	Type	Established	Notes
Brunei Darussalam	Legislative Council	Unicameral	1959	Suspended in 1984, reconvened in 2004
Hong Kong	Legislative Council	Unicameral	1843	Established under the British Hong Kong era; Provisional Legislative Council 1997–98
Isle of Man	Legislative Council	Upper House		
Palestine	Legislative Council	Unicameral	1996	
Saint Helena	Legislative Council	Unicameral		

In India, the Vidhan Parishad is another name for the Legislative Council in those states with bicameral legislatures.

Existing sub-national legislative councils
Country	Region	Body	Type	Established	Notes
Australia	New South Wales	Legislative Council	Upper House	1824	Unicameral until 1856
Australia	South Australia	Legislative Council	Upper House	1840	Unicameral until 1857
Australia	Tasmania	Legislative Council	Upper House	1825	Unicameral until 1856
Australia	Victoria	Legislative Council	Upper House	1851	Unicameral until 1856
Australia	Western Australia	Legislative Council	Upper House	1832	Unicameral until 1890
India	Andhra Pradesh	Legislative Council	Upper House	1958	Abolished between 1985 and 2007
India	Bihar	Legislative Council	Upper House	1912	Unicameral until 1920
India	Karnataka	Legislative Council	Upper House	1956	
India	Maharashtra	Legislative Council	Upper House	1960	
India	Telangana	Legislative Council	Upper House	2014	
India	Uttar Pradesh	Legislative Council	Upper House	1935	
Venezuela	Zulia	Legislative Council	Unicameral	1864	

Defunct national and colonial legislative councils
Country / Colony	Body	Type	Established	Disestablished	Notes
Aden	Legislative Council	Unicameral	1947		
Antigua and Barbuda	Legislative Council	Unicameral			Established under instructions to the governor
Bahamas	Legislative Council	Unicameral	1841		Letters patent
Barbados	Legislative Council	Unicameral		1963	Established under instructions to the governor
Basutoland	Legislative Council	Unicameral	1960		Established under instructions to the governor
Bechuanaland Protectorate	Legislative Council	Unicameral	1961	1965	
Bermuda	Legislative Council	Bicameral	1612	1980	Originally a single thirteen-member Council combined Executive (cabinet) and Legislative functions. Established under royal charters to the London Company in 1606, 1609, and 1612, and to the Somers Isles Company in 1615, transmitted via the Governor. Elected lower House of Assembly held first session in 1620, with council becoming upper house. The council split in 1888 into an Executive Council and a Legislative Council. Colonial legislature was updated to the Westminster system in 1968. Executive Council was renamed the Cabinet in 1973, and is now formed from Members of the majority party in the House of Assembly. Legislative Council was renamed the Senate of Bermuda in 1980, and is now composed of five Members recommended by the Premier, three by the Leader of the Opposition, and three by the Governor acting in his own discretion, all appointed by the Governor.
British Columbia	Legislative Council	Unicameral	1867	1871	
British Guiana	Legislative Council	Unicameral	1928	1961	Established by an act of Parliament, the British Guiana Act 1928; abolished between 1953 and 1954.
British Honduras	Legislative Council	Unicameral	1853		Established under instructions to the governor
British India	Imperial Legislative Council	Bicameral	1861	1947	Unicameral until 1920
British Virgin Islands	Legislative Council	Unicameral	1867	2007	
Burma	Legislative Council	Unicameral	1897	1936	
Ceylon	Legislative Council	Unicameral	1833	1931	Established under the prerogative
Cyprus	Legislative Council	Unicameral			Established under the prerogative
Dominica	Legislative Council	Unicameral	1832		Established by an act of Parliament
Falkland Islands	Legislative Council	Unicameral	1845	2009	Established under the British Settlements Act 1843
Fiji	Legislative Council	Unicameral			Established under the prerogative
Gambia	Legislative Council	Unicameral	1843		Established under the British Settlements Act 1843
Gibraltar	Legislative Council	Unicameral	1950	1969	
Gold Coast	Legislative Council	Unicameral			Established under the British Settlements Act 1843
Grenada	Legislative Council	Unicameral	1924		Established by the Saint Vincent, Tobago, and Grenada Constitution Act 1876
Jamaica	Legislative Council	Unicameral	1866		
Kenya	Legislative Council	Unicameral	1907	1963	Established under the British Settlements Act 1843
(United Kingdom) Lower Canada	Legislative Council	Upper House	1791	1841	
Malaya	Federal Legislative Council	Unicameral	1948	1957	
Malta	Legislative Council	Unicameral			Established under the prerogative
Manchukuo	Legislative Council	Unicameral	1934	1945	Puppet state of the Empire of Japan
Mandatory Palestine	Legislative Council	Unicameral	1922	1923	
Mauritius	Legislative Council	Unicameral			Established under the prerogative
Montserrat	Legislative Council	Unicameral		2011	Established under instructions to the governor
New Zealand	Legislative Council	Upper House	1841	1950	Unicameral until 1853
Newfoundland	Legislative Council	Upper House	1833	1934	
Nigeria	Legislative Council	Unicameral			Established under the prerogative
Northern Rhodesia	Legislative Council	Unicameral			Established under the Foreign Jurisdiction Act 1843
Nyasaland	Legislative Council	Unicameral	1907		Established under the Foreign Jurisdiction Act 1843
Papua New Guinea	Legislative Council	Unicameral	1951	1963	
(Portugal) Portuguese Guinea	Legislative Council	Unicameral	1963	1972	Became the Legislative Assembly
(Portugal) Portuguese West Africa	Legislative Council	Unicameral	1922	1972	Abolished between 1926 and 1955
(United Kingdom) Province of Canada	Legislative Council	Upper House	1841	1867	
Romania	Legislative Council	Consultative	1923	1948	Established under Article 76 of the 1923 Constitution and retained under Article 72 of the 1938 Constitution
St Kitts-Nevis-Anguilla	Legislative Council	Unicameral	1832		Established under instructions to the governor
St Lucia	Legislative Council	Unicameral	1832	1967	Established under the prerogative
St Vincent	Legislative Council	Unicameral	1924		Established by the Saint Vincent, Tobago, and Grenada Constitution Act 1876
Seychelles	Legislative Council	Unicameral	1962	1970	Established under the prerogative
Sierra Leone	Legislative Council	Unicameral			Established under the British Settlements Act 1843
Solomon Islands	Legislative Council	Unicameral	1960	1970	
Southern Rhodesia	Legislative Council	Unicameral	1898	1923	Established under the prerogative
Straits Settlements	Legislative Council	Unicameral	1867		Established by an act of Parliament, the Straights Settlement Act 1866, and letters patent of 4 February 1867.
Singapore	Legislative Council	Unicameral	1946	1953	
Swaziland	Legislative Council	Unicameral	1964	1967	Established in the Constitution of 1964
Trinidad and Tobago	Legislative Council	Unicameral	1925	1961	Established under the prerogative
Tanganyika	Legislative Council	Unicameral			Established under the Foreign Jurisdiction Act 1843
Turks and Caicos Islands	Legislative Council	Unicameral		2006	
Uganda	Legislative Council	Unicameral	1920	1962	Established under the Foreign Jurisdiction Act 1843
(United Kingdom) Upper Canada	Legislative Council	Upper House	1791	1841	
Zaire	Legislative Council	Unicameral	1972	1990	

Defunct sub-national legislative councils
Country	Region	Body	Type	Established	Disestablished	Notes
Australia	Queensland	Legislative Council	Upper House	1860	1922	
British India	Bengal	Legislative Council	Upper House	1861	1947	Unicameral until 1937
British India	Eastern Bengal and Assam	Legislative Council	Unicameral	1906	1912	
Canada	Manitoba	Legislative Council	Upper House	1870	1876	First province to eliminate upper chamber.
Canada	New Brunswick	Legislative Council	Upper House	1785	1891	
Canada	Nova Scotia	Legislative Council	Upper House	1838	1928	
Canada	Prince Edward Island	Legislative Council	Upper House	1773	1893	
Canada	Quebec	Legislative Council	Upper House	1867	1968	Last province to eliminate upper chamber.
India	Assam	Legislative Council	Upper House	1935	1969	
India	Bombay	Legislative Council	Upper House	1861	1960	Unicameral until 1935
India	Cochin	Legislative Council	Unicameral	1925	1949	
India	Jammu and Kashmir	Legislative Council	Upper House	1957	2019	
India	Madhya Pradesh	Legislative Council	Upper House	1956	1969	
India	Punjab	Legislative Council	Upper House	1956	1969	
India	Tamil Nadu	Legislative Council	Upper House	1956	1986	
India	West Bengal	Legislative Council	Upper House	1952	1969	
United States	Delaware	Legislative Council	Upper House	1776	1792	
United States	Florida Territory	Legislative Council	Bicameral	1822	1845	
United States	New Jersey	Legislative Council	Upper House	1776	1844	
United States	South Carolina	Legislative Council	Upper House	1776	1778	

== United States ==
In American English, the term "legislative council" has acquired a slightly different meaning since the 1930s. It refers to a joint committee with members from both houses of the state legislature, which supervises a staff of attorneys, accountants, and researchers charged with providing strictly nonpartisan support services to the legislature or to particular committees. The concept of the legislative council was first developed in Kansas and was implemented by the Kansas Legislature in 1933. Eventually, a majority of U.S. states adopted legislative councils, but under a variety of names. Between 1933 and 1959, at least 32 states had legislative councils.

Kansas still uses a legislative council, although it was converted into the Kansas Legislative Coordinating Council in 1971. Legislative councils operating under that name exist in the states of Arkansas, Arizona, Colorado, Montana, North Dakota, Texas, and Wisconsin. Several states use the term "commission" for the same thing, including New Jersey and Nevada.

A few states, like California, have a "legislative counsel", not "council", who is appointed by a vote of the entire legislature and is thus responsible to the body as a whole rather than a "council" within it.

== See also ==
- House of Assembly
- Legislative assembly
- Legislative Yuan
