= Hong Kong Bill of Rights Ordinance =

Legislation of Hong Kong

Legislative Council of Hong Kong
- Long title: An Ordinance to provide for the incorporation into the law of Hong Kong of provisions of the International Covenant on Civil and Political Rights as applied to Hong Kong; and for ancillary and connected matters.
- Citation: Cap. 383
- Enacted by: Legislative Council of Hong Kong
- Commenced: 7 June 1991

Legislative history
- Introduced by: Chief Secretary Sir David Robert Ford
- Introduced: 20 July 1990
- First reading: 25 July 1990
- Second reading: 5 June 1991
- Third reading: 5 June 1991

Amended by
- 1995, 1997, 1998, 1999, 2003, 2017
- Status: Current legislation

Hong Kong Bill of Rights Ordinance
- Traditional Chinese: 香港人權法案條例
Transcriptions
Yue: Cantonese
- Yale Romanization: Hēung góng yàhn kyùhn faat on tìuh laih
- Jyutping: Hoeng^{1} gong^{2} jan^{4} kyun^{4} faat^{3} on^{3} tiu^{4} lai^{6}

The Hong Kong Bill of Rights Ordinance (HKBORO), often referred to as the Hong Kong Bill of Rights, is Chapter 383 of the Laws of Hong Kong, which transposed the International Covenant on Civil and Political Rights so that it is incorporated into Hong Kong law.

== Background ==
The Government of the United Kingdom ratified the International Covenant on Civil and Political Rights (ICCPR) on 20 May 1976. The ICCPR was extended to British Dependent Territories, including Hong Kong, in the same year. Continued application of the ICCPR in the Hong Kong Special Administration Region was stipulated in the Sino-British Joint Declaration and Article 39 of the Basic Law.

After the 1989 Tiananmen Square protests and massacre in the summer of 1989, the Hong Kong Bill of Rights Ordinance was intended to restore the shattered confidence of the people of Hong Kong in their future. Amidst growing urges in society on giving effect to rights in the ICCPR in the domestic law of Hong Kong, the Hong Kong Government decided to draft a Bill of Rights for Hong Kong to incorporate into domestic law relevant rights, as applied in Hong Kong. The Bill of Rights met strong opposition from the Chinese Government as soon as it was proposed. The Chinese Government regarded the Bill of Rights as unnecessary, detrimental to the maintenance of public order, and inconsistent with the Basic Law.

The objection of the Chinese Government had a profound impact on both the form and the content of the Bill of Rights. In terms of its content, in order to ensure the consistency of the Bill of Rights with the Basic Law, it was decided that, instead of drafting a bill which was tailor-made for Hong Kong, the Bill of Rights should simply incorporate the ICCPR as applied to Hong Kong. It had been agreed in the Sino-British Joint Declaration that the ICCPR as applied to Hong Kong shall remain in force after the changeover. The expression 'as applied to Hong Kong' was understood to include the substantive rights provisions of the ICCPR subject to the reservations entered by the United Kingdom upon her ratification of the same. Hence, Part II of the present Ordinance reproduces verbatim the substantive rights provisions of the ICCPR, subject to minor changes reflecting the fact that Hong Kong is not a sovereign state. Part III of the HKBORO reproduces, albeit in slightly different language, the reservations entered by the United Kingdom in respect of Hong Kong.

The Bill of Rights was introduced to the Legislative Council on 25 July 1990, passed by the Legislative Council in June 1991 and was enacted on 8 June 1991. Corresponding amendments were made to the Letters Patent to give the ICCPR an “entrenched status” in Hong Kong’s constitutional documents. After its enactment, any legislation which encroach the HKBORO would be deemed unconstitutional.

== Structure ==
HKBORO contains 14 sections divided into three parts:

- Part I (sections 1-7): provisions relating to the Ordinance's effect, remedies, and conditions under which derogations from the rights guaranteed in the Ordinance are permitted;
- Part II (section 8): The Hong Kong Bill of Rights, incorporating text of relevant rights in the ICCPR as divided into 23 Articles; and
- Part III (sections 9-14): provisions of exceptions and savings, reflecting limitations to the scope of ICCPR as applied in Hong Kong with the effect of limiting the obligation of the Government to recognise certain rights and freedoms.

== Status in the hierarchy of law ==
Before 1997, the Ordinance overrides other Hong Kong legislation as provided by Sections 3 and 4 of the Ordinance.

- Section 3(2) provides that all earlier laws identified as contravening the Ordinance are to be repealed.
- Section 4 provides that all legislations enacted on or after the commencement date shall be construed in such way to be consistent with the ICCPR as applied in Hong Kong.

The HKBORO was given an entrenched status by an amendment to the Hong Kong Letters Patent which stipulated that no law shall be made after 8 June 1991 that "restricts the rights and freedoms enjoyed in Hong Kong in a manner which is inconsistent with the ICCPR as applied to Hong Kong." Any statutory provision which is inconsistent with the Bill of Rights was repealed on 8 June 1991, upon the commencement of the HKBORO. This led to the amendment of some Hong Kong laws so as to bring them in conformity with the HKBORO, for example the Public Order Ordinance.

=== Post-handover entrenched status ===
The Chinese Government objected to the entrenched status of the HKBORO; otherwise this would be a departure from the Basic Law since no legislation in Hong Kong prior to the change of sovereignty in 1997 enjoyed a higher status than other legislation. As such, Sections 2(3), 3 and 4 were not adopted as part of the laws of the Hong Kong SAR in accordance with the Decision of the Standing Committee of the National People's Congress on 23 February 1997.

Even so, the entrenched status of the ICCPR (and subsequently the HKBORO) in the constitutional framework of Hong Kong continue with the effect of article 39 of the Basic Law, while the Basic Law itself consisted of provisions of fundamental rights and freedoms of Hong Kong residents. The Court of Final Appeal has recognized that provision on rights in HKBORO continue to override contravening laws:

The Hong Kong Bill of Rights Ordinance… in fact provides for the incorporation of the provisions of the ICCPR into the laws of Hong Kong…. by virtue of art 39(2) of the Basic Law, a restriction on either freedom [in BORO or Basic Law] cannot contravene the provisions of the ICCPR”.

— Chief Justice Andrew Li, HKSAR v. Ng Kung Siu (1999) 2 HKCFAR 442

== Significance ==
The enactment of HKBORO in 1991 provided the foundation for constitutional guarantees of rights and freedom in Hong Kong. Albert Chen Hung-yee described the enactment of the Ordinance as “the first constitutional revolution” in Hong Kong. Before its enactment, human rights protection was exclusively reliant on judge-made common law principles; courts were not empowered to conduct constitutional review of legislations for the lack of relevant provisions on human rights protection in the Hong Kong Letters Patent.

With the advent of HKBORO, the courts of Hong Kong embarked upon an era of meaningful constitutional review. In early days the Courts were concerned with whether pre-8 June 1991 legislation had been repealed by the HKBORO for inconsistency. The period from 8 June 1991 to 1 July 1997 was described as one during which the courts of Hong Kong produced a valuable if not very large body of human rights jurisprudence and gained a useful six years of pre-handover experience of meaningful constitutional review.

=== After the Handover ===
Article 39 of the Basic Law creates a part of the post-handover tripartite framework on human rights protection, where:

A right may be provided for (i) in both the Basic Law and the [Hong Kong Bill of Rights Ordinance (Bill); or (ii) only in the Basic Law and not in the Bill; or (iii) only in the Bill but not in the Basic Law.

— Chief Justice Andrew Li, Gurung Kesh Bahadur v Director of Immigration (2002) 5 HKCFAR 480

Any restrictions on rights and freedoms stipulated the ICCPR (and subsequently the HKBORO) must be prescribed by law and justified, according to Chief Justice Andrew Li in Gurung Kesh Bahadur v Director of Immigration (2002) 5 HKCFAR 480. Subsequently, the proportionality test was developed in Leung Kwok Hung v HKSAR(2005) 8 HKCFAR 229:

[T]he restriction must be rationally connected with one or more of the legitimate purposes; and (2) the means used to impair the right of peaceful assembly must be no more than is necessary to accomplish the legitimate purpose in question.

— Chief Justice Andrew Li, Permanent Judges Patrick Chan Siu-oi and Roberto Ribeiro and Non-permanent Judge Sir Anthony Mason, Leung Kwok Hung v HKSAR(2005) 8 HKCFAR 229

== Notable applications and case law ==
The HKBORO enabled Hong Kong to enter the era of judicial review of legislations. The practice of utilizing constitutional review of legislation flourished. Constitutional review principles like proportionality have since been developed.

- The first Bill of Rights case, R v Sin Yau Ming [1992] 1 HKCLR 127, decided by the Court of Appeal concerning the presumption of innocence.
- Restrictions on peaceful assembly provided in the Public Order Ordinance, such as that on the licensing system which required the Police’s consent in holding processions, was repealed by the Legislative Council in 1995 according to provisions in the HKBORO.
- Leung Kwok Hung v HKSAR (2005): the Appellant challenged that the discretion of the Commissioner of Police to object to processions for the purpose of public order was too wide and contravened art. 17 of the HKBORO, and relevant provisions in the ICCPR and the Basic Law. The Court of Final Appeal further developed the proportionality test.

The HKBORO in some circumstances also imposes an obligation for positive actions to manifest rights provided in the Ordinance through enacting laws and adopting social policies.

- in achieving the rights to privacy as provided in article 14 of the HKBORO, the Hong Kong Government enacted the Interception of Communications and Surveillance Ordinance (Cap. 589) in 2006, following the judgment in Koo Sze Yiu v Chief Executive of the HKSAR (2006) which called for appropriate restrictions on the government’s interception of communications.

== See also ==
- Human rights in Hong Kong
- Human Rights Act 1998
- United States Bill of Rights
