= Subsidiary legislation in Hong Kong =

Subsidiary legislation in Hong Kong is law made with powers delegated by a law enacted by the Legislative Council of Hong Kong. According to the Department of Justice, Hong Kong has a large volume of subsidiary legislation. The making of subsidiary legislation is subject to the ambit of administrative law.

== Definition ==
Subsidiary legislation refers to legislation made under delegated powers granted by other legislation made by the Legislative Council of Hong Kong. Very often, the powers are given to the executive branch, such as a particular government organ.

However, not all rules made by the executive are subsidiary legislation. The government may make policy documents in the absence of statutory delegation, although sometimes such documents are authorized by statute. Such documents are not binding in nature and has no strict legal status. On the other hand, subsidiary legislation creates binding rights and obligations.

== Constitutional basis ==
Subsidiary legislation is authorized by the Basic Law under Article 56 and 62.

== Control of subsidiary legislation ==
There are concerns that subsidiary legislation may be abused and threaten the powers of the legislature. Therefore, there are methods for controlling subsidiary legislation, the main ones being legislative control and judicial review.

=== Legislative control ===
Legislative control of subsidiary legislation is mainly contained in the Interpretation and General Clauses Ordinance (Cap. 1). Section 28(1)(b) stipulates that no subsidiary legislation shall be inconsistent with the provisions of any Ordinance. Section 28(1)(c) states that subsidiary legislation may at any time be amended by the person making it and in the same manner by and in which it was made. Section 28(1)(e) sets an upper limit on the maximum punishment that can be laid down in subsidiary legislative provisions that create criminal offences.

Section 34 of the same Ordinance requires that all subsidiary legislation shall be laid on the table of the Legislative Council at the next sitting after the publication in the Gazette of that subsidiary legislation. In such circumstances, the Legislative Council may, by resolution amend the subsidiary legislation in any manner consistent with the power to make such subsidiary legislation.

Section 35 further provides that where any Ordinance provides that its subsidiary legislation shall be subject to the approval of the Legislative Council or other authority, then the subsidiary legislation shall be submitted for approval by the Legislative Council or other authority, and the Legislative Council may by resolution or the other authority may by order amend the whole or any part of the subsidiary legislation.

However, it has been held that failure to table does not affect validity of the subsidiary legislation. It is also possible for the enabling legislation to exempt the requirement of tabling.

=== Judicial review ===
Subsidiary legislation is subject to judicial review. One of the main grounds of invalidity of subsidiary legislation is excess of enabling power, which questions whether the subsidiary legislation has gone further than the scope permitted by the enabling legislation. In Water Network Ltd v The Urban Council, the Urban Council had power to issue subsidiary legislation for operation of hawking. Traditionally, there has been two categories of hawking: fixed place hawking and itinerant hawking. Subsidiary legislation was amended so that licenses for itinerant hawkers would no longer be issued, thereby prohibiting such hawking. The Privy Council held, on appeal from Hong Kong, that the word regulate means that while it would be impossible to wholly prohibit hawking of all types, it is permissible to partially prohibit hawking of certain types under parliamentary sovereignty. Therefore, the subsidiary legislation in question was invalid. In Kambo Mercedes & Another v Jenny McElney and Others, the courts have power under the Supreme Court Ordinance to make rules governing "practice and procedure". However, the Rules of High Court, which was a subsidiary legislation made under the Supreme Court Ordinance, conferred power on judges to grant monetary award and holiday pay to amend pleadings so as to add new causes of action, even if the legislation period has expired. It was held the provision concerned was not strong since practice and procedure does not entail that new rights can be created. Nor does the phrase allow interference with existing rights. If a subsidiary legislation is indeed found to be in excess of enabling power, the court must strike it down

== 2010 constitutional row ==
The Hong Kong government claimed that the Tseung Kwan O landfill would be full by 2013. On 31 May 2010, the Chief Executive in Council passed an order replacing the original country park map with a new one. The area covered by the new map is approximately 5 acres smaller than that covered by the old map. The 5 acres would be used in expanding the landfill. The Legislative Council subcommittee responsible for scrutinizing the order decided on 4 October 2010 that it would move a motion in a Legislative Council meeting on 13 October to repeal the order. On 6 October 2010, Environment Secretary Edward Yau Tang-wah said the government decided to postpone the plan from November 1 to January 1, 2012, to give lawmakers more time to study its implications. On 12 October, Legislative Council President Tsang Yok-sing granted a motion seeking to repeal the order, to be tabled on 13 October. It was agreed by the government and the Legislative Council that the order concerned is a piece of subsidiary legislation. However, the two parties disagreed as to what the legislature can do on a chief executive's order that has been approved by the Chief Executive-in- Council. While the Department of Justice said the repeal would have no legal effect in law, and the designation order would remain in force even if Legco passed the motion to repeal, the Legislative Council legal adviser Jimmy Ma insisted that the legislature has the power to repeal the order to change the park boundary to expand the landfill. The matter centres on the proper interpretation to be given to the word "amend" and may have to be settled by judicial review if the motion is passed.

== See also ==
- Delegated legislation in the United Kingdom
