= Organic Statute of Macau =

Portuguese organic law

Chinese name
- Traditional Chinese: 澳門組織章程
- Simplified Chinese: 澳门组织章程
Transcriptions
Standard Mandarin
- Hanyu Pinyin: Àomén Zǔzhī Zhāngchéng
Yue: Cantonese
- Jyutping: ou3 mun4*2 zou2 zik1 zoeng1 cing4

Portuguese name
- Portuguese: Estatuto Orgânico de Macau

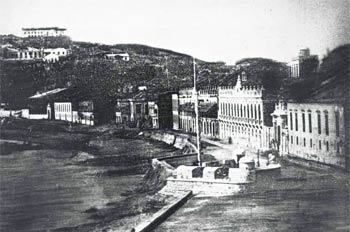
Macao, 1844

The Organic Statute of Macau (Portuguese: Estatuto Orgânico de Macau, EOM; Chinese: 澳門組織章程) was a Portuguese organic law (Law No. 1/76) that provided for government in Portuguese Macau. Approved on 17 February 1976, the Portuguese legislation also reclassified Macau as a "Chinese territory under Portuguese administration" (território chinês sob administração portuguesa).

The promulgation of the EOM was aimed at creating a new and more autonomous political model. It was the most important piece of local legislation defining the functions of Macau's main political, legal and administrative bodies and the general operation of the Territory. As a result of the approval of the EOM, a political novelty for Macau was born in 1976: the major remodelling and partial democratization of the Legislative Assembly of Macau to exercise the legislative function of the city.

The Organic Statute of Macau replaces the Political-Administrative Statute of the province of Macau, which, approved in 1963, enshrined in Macau the old colonial model based on the colonialist and authoritarian ideology of the Estado Novo, overthrown precisely in the Carnation Revolution of 1974.

The Organic Statute of Macau, in accordance with the Constitution of the Portuguese Republic, was amended successively by Law No. 53/79 of Macau, of September 14, 1979; Law No. 13/90 of Macau, of May 10, 1990; and Law No. 23-A/96 of Macau, of July 29, 1996.

On December 20, 1999, the organic statute ceased to have effect following the implementation of the Macau Basic Law, as the territory became a special administrative region of the People's Republic of China and ceased to be a territory under Portuguese administration.

== Autonomy and legislative powers ==
The Organic Statute of Macau provided the region with a legislative framework that allowed its government to establish its own legal and fiscal policies. Unlike Portugal's Autonomous Regions, Macau's Legislative Assembly was granted exclusive authority over key aspects of its governance, including taxation, legal system, and economic development strategies.

=== Comparison with the autonomy of the Azores and Madeira ===
At the same time that Macau received broad legislative and fiscal powers, Portugal was also implementing autonomy statutes for the Azores and Madeira. The Political-Administrative Statute of the Autonomous Regions of the Azores and Madeira, formalized under the Portuguese Constitution of 1976, granted these Atlantic archipelagos self-governance in various domains. However, the level of autonomy granted to the Azores and Madeira was significantly less comprehensive than that given to Macau.

==== Fiscal autonomy disparity ====
One of the key differences between Macau's statute and those of the Portuguese autonomous regions lies in fiscal policy. Under the EOM, Macau had full autonomy to define its tax regime, including setting tax rates, determining exemptions, and controlling revenue allocation. This financial independence was instrumental in the economic boom that Macau experienced during the 1990s. In contrast, Madeira and the Azores remained partially dependent on financial transfers from the Portuguese state and without full powers over taxation.

== See also ==
- Portuguese Macau
- Hong Kong Royal Instructions (esp. the ones from 1917) and Hong Kong Letters Patent (esp. the ones from 1917), British Hong Kong equivalents
