= Macau National Security Law =

2009 Macau law

Safeguarding National Security Law
- Emblem of the Macao Special Administrative Region of the People's Republic of China

Legislative Assembly of Macau
- Citation: Law 2 of 2009
- Passed by: Legislative Assembly of Macau
- Passed: 25 February 2009
- Signed by: Edmund Ho Hau-wah
- Signed: 26 February 2009
- Commenced: 2 March 2009
- Effective: 3 March 2009

Legislative history
- Introduced: 19 February 2008
- Committee report: Second Permanent Committee report

Amends
- Criminal Procedure Code
- Status: In force (amended)

Macau National Security Law

Chinese name
- Traditional Chinese: 維護國家安全法
- Simplified Chinese: 维护国家安全法
- Literal meaning: Safeguarding National Security Law
Transcriptions
Standard Mandarin
- Hanyu Pinyin: Wéihù Guójiā'ānquán Fǎ
Yue: Cantonese
- Jyutping: wai4 wu6 gwok3 gaa1 on1 cyun4 faat3

Portuguese name
- Portuguese: Lei relativa à defesa da segurança do Estado

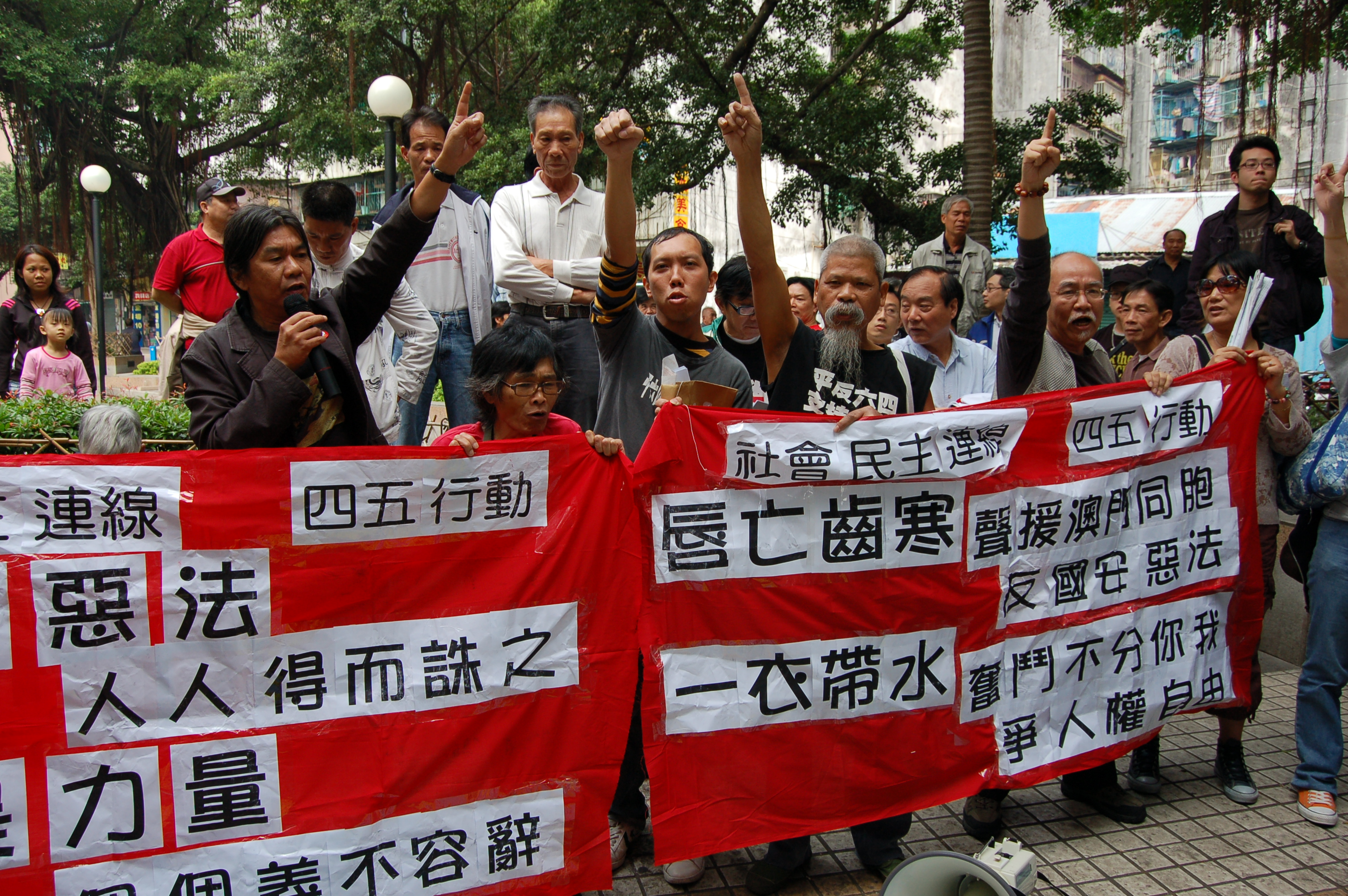
Demonstration against the Article 23 law in Macau

The Macau National Security Law (Chinese: 維護國家安全法, lit. 'Safeguarding National Security Law'; Portuguese: Lei relativa à defesa da segurança do Estado, lit. 'Law related to the defense of the security of the State') is a law in Macau which prohibits and punishes acts of treason, secession, and subversion against the Central government, as well as preparative acts leading to any of the three acts. Taken into effect on 3 March 2009, the purpose of the law is to fulfil Article 23 of the Macau Basic Law, the de facto constitution of the Macau Special Administration Region.

== History ==
According to the Secretary for Administration and Justice Florinda da Rosa Silva Chan, drafting began in 2004, taking into account examples from Portugal and Italy. Until 1999, Macau was a colony of Portugal. The draft was released on 22 October 2008. It proposed to ban treason, attempts to overthrow the Chinese government and theft of national secrets. Some of the proposed offenses carry a maximum penalty of 25 years in jail.

The law came into force in 2009. This caused some disquiet and concern among pro-democrats, who fear that this new law could limit Macao residents' freedom of expression and protest, and that it is intended to serve as an example for its rebellious counterpart, Hong Kong.

=== Response to drafting of the law ===
Edmund Ho, Chief Executive of Macau, said in a press conference that the bill targets "serious criminal behavior" and will not limit protests or criticism of Beijing. He further said "Chanting a few slogans, writing a few articles criticizing the central government or the Macau government, these activities won't be regulated by this proposed law." Macau Legislator Au Kam-san said "We don't want to see any mainland style national security law. It would be acceptable to enact a law based on the Johannesburg Principles."

Political commentator Larry So Man-yum said the legislation would do well in Macau given residents' patriotism and their lack of awareness about civil rights. "There will be absolutely no problem. Compared to Hongkongers, Macau people have high levels of acceptance for the central government. No "Broomhead" will emerge in Macau." In 2003, Secretary for Security Regina Ip was nicknamed "Broomhead" for attempting to sell Article 23 in Hong Kong. The Hong Kong government on 22 October responded with having no plan to embark on the legislation, adding its most pressing commitments are economic and livelihood issues.

=== Hong Kong protests ===
During the 2019–2020 Hong Kong protests, Macau stayed largely silent, as was predicted. This meant that no modification to Macau's NSL was made at the moment, making it, in the view of the Central Government, "a posterchild of the one country, two systems" policy, and "an example for Taiwan". This has been attributed to Macau's strong economic performance and the comparatively greater willingness of the Portuguese colonial administration to allow Chinese integration earlier on, including during the Cultural Revolution.

=== 2023 update ===
National Security legislation was updated on 18 May 2023, when the Legislature unanimously passed amendments aimed at "further protecting National Security in the complicated environment faced by China", including expanding the definition of secession to include acts of non-violence, and redefining the crime of "theft of official secrets" as "violation of official secrets".

== See also ==
- One country, two systems
- Human rights in the People's Republic of China
- Human rights in Macau
- Human rights in Hong Kong
- Hong Kong Macau cultural exchange
- Hong Kong national security law

== Bibliography ==
- Godinho, Jorge A. F. (2008), "The Regulation of Article 23 of the Macau Basic Law: A Commentary of the Draft Law on the Protection of State Security [O artigo 23 da Lei Basica de Macau. Comentario a proposta de lei de proteccao da seguranca do Estado]", SSRN Electronic Journal (in English, Portuguese, and Chinese), doi:10.2139/ssrn.1303245, SSRN 1303245. Includes English translation of most of the draft law.
