= Madhya Pradesh Legislative Council =

Defunct upper house in India

The Madhya Pradesh Legislative Council was the proposed upper house of the Legislature of the state of Madhya Pradesh, India. It was to be formed after the passage of the States Reorganisation Act, 1956 with 72 seats. This was later increased to 90 seats after the passage of the Legislative Councils Act, 1957. But the Council never came into effect as it was not given a date of notification by the president.

Before the 2018 Madhya Pradesh Legislative Assembly election, the Congress made promises to re-create the Legislative Council.

In 2019, there were demands for re-creation of the Legislative Council.
