= Hong Kong trade mark law =

The trade mark law of Hong Kong is based on the Trade Marks Ordinance Cap. 559, which came into force on 4 April 2003 and repealed the Trade Mark Ordinance Cap 43 passed in 1873. The system established by this legislation is entirely separate to the system used in the People's Republic of China, pursuant to the "one country-two systems" policy. The superseded law and the current law share many similarities with the relevant legislation in the United Kingdom, a similarity which is also facilitated by TRIPs.

The new law introduced various substantive and procedural changes, such as expanding the legal definition of a trademark; including or broadening protection for certification marks, collective marks, and well-known trade marks; reducing the period of non-use for revocation purpose from five to three years; and simplifying and streamlining procedures for the registration of assignments, and "registrable transactions" such as licenses.

== Procedure ==
=== Filing to registration ===
Registration of a trade mark in Hong Kong commences with the filing of an application at the Trade Mark Registry of the Hong Kong Intellectual Property Department. An application may cover one or more classes of products and/or services. The standard total cost for using the services of a trademark attorney to handle the filing of an application in one class is HK$4,300 (the professional component of this fee is recommended by the Hong Kong Law Society). The official filing fees levied by the Intellectual Property Department of Hong Kong are HK$2000 for the first class and an additional HK$1000 per additional class. There will be additional fees for other stages in the registration process.

Firstly, the application is assessed by an examiner for deficiencies which go to formalities. The next stage is substantive examination, where the main grounds of objection could be raised: absolute grounds for refusal (e.g. where the mark is inherently not registerable), and relative grounds for refusal (e.g. where the mark is identical or similar to mark covered by an application or registration filed earlier in time).

After the objections (if any) are overcome, the application will be accepted by the registry and published for opposition purposes for an extendable period of three months to allow third parties to object to registration of the mark on certain grounds.

Once any oppositions are resolved, a certificate of registration will be issued. The standard timeframe to registration for an application which encounters few if any problems or difficulties is 12 months.

Upon registration, and subject to the discussion on revocation below, a trade mark is valid for an extendible period of 10 years.

=== Post-registration ===
A registration for a trade mark may be subject to revocation by a third party if the trade mark has not been genuinely and continuously used for at least three years, and there are no valid reasons explaining the lack of use.

== The old law ==
The old trade mark law (Cap. 43) divided the register of trade marks into two parts called "Part A" and "Part B", whereby the owners of distinctive marks could seek registration under Part A, while the owners of marks with some distinctive character could pursue registration under Part B. Part B registration meant that certain rights were not available to the trade mark owner, which were otherwise available to the owner of a Part A registration.

Under the new law, the division of the register was abolished, and one standard of registrability was introduced.

== See also ==
- Hong Kong copyright law
- Intellectual property
- People's Republic of China's trademark law
