= Hong Kong Basic Law =

Chinese national law

Basic Law of the Hong Kong Special Administrative Region of the People's Republic of China
- Edition of the Basic Law published by the Constitutional and Mainland Affairs Bureau

Overview
- Jurisdiction: Hong Kong
- Subordinate to: Constitution of China
- Created: 4 April 1990
- Date effective: 1 July 1997
- System: Special administrative region
- Chambers: Legislative Council of Hong Kong
- Executive: Chief Executive of Hong Kong
- Author: Hong Kong Basic Law Drafting Committee
- Signatories: Yang Shangkun, President of China

Full text
- Basic Law of the Hong Kong Special Administrative Region at Wikisource

Hong Kong Basic Law
- Chinese: 香港基本法
Transcriptions
Standard Mandarin
- Hanyu Pinyin: Xiānggǎng Jīběnfǎ
Yue: Cantonese
- Yale Romanization: Hēung góng gēi bún faat
- Jyutping: Hoeng1 gong2 gei1 bun2 faat3

Basic Law of the Hong Kong Special Administrative Region of the People's Republic of China
- Traditional Chinese: 中華人民共和國香港特別行政區基本法
- Simplified Chinese: 中华人民共和国香港特别行政区基本法
Transcriptions
Standard Mandarin
- Hanyu Pinyin: Zhōnghúa Rénmín Gònghéguó Xiānggǎng Tèbié Xíngzhèngqū Jīběnfǎ []
Yue: Cantonese
- Yale Romanization: Jūng wàh yàhn màhn guhn gwòh gwok Hēung góng dahk biht hàhng jing kēui gēi bún faat
- Jyutping: Zung1 waa4 jan4 man4 gung6 wo4 gwok3 Hoeng1 gong2 dak6 bit6 hang4 zing3 keoi1 gei1 bun2 faat3

The Basic Law of the Hong Kong Special Administrative Region of the People's Republic of China is a Chinese national law that describes the system of government of Hong Kong as a Special Administrative Region. With nine chapters, 160 articles, and three annexes, the law implements the basic policies declared by China in the 1984 Sino-British Joint Declaration that would apply to Hong Kong once British colonial rule ended in 1997.

Under the law's basic principle of "one country, two systems", the socialist system and policies of China are excluded from Hong Kong. Instead, Hong Kong will continue its capitalist system and way of life from before 1997 for at least 50 years through to 2047. As an organic law, the Basic Law also describes sources of law, the branches of government, the relationship between Hong Kong and the Chinese Central People's Government (State Council), and the fundamental rights and duties of Hong Kong residents.

The drafting process began in 1985. The law was enacted by the National People's Congress on 4 April 1990 and took effect on 1 July 1997 after the handover of Hong Kong. It replaced the Letters Patent and the Royal Instructions as Hong Kong's main constitutional document. As such, the Basic Law has been referred to as Hong Kong's "mini constitution".

== History ==
Qing China ceded Hong Kong Island and parts of the Kowloon Peninsula to the United Kingdom after it was defeated in the Opium Wars of the mid-19th century. The British government then obtained a 99-year lease of the New Territories in 1898, which expanded the colony of Hong Kong for the final time. Chinese governments following the Qing Empire's collapse in 1911 refer to these agreements as "unequal treaties" and were invalid.

In 1982, Chinese and British officials separately began to meet Hong Kong business and political elites in Hong Kong. In September, Deng Xiaoping met Thatcher in Beijing and told her that China's sovereignty over Hong Kong was not negotiable, but both agreed to begin diplomatic discussions. The Chinese government then declared that it would "resume exercising sovereignty" in Hong Kong in 1997 peacefully while maintaining Hong Kong's stability and standing in the global economy. Diplomatic efforts resulted in the signing of the Sino-British Joint Declaration in 1984 to prepare for sovereignty over Hong Kong to be transferred from the United Kingdom to China in 1997.

Shortly after, the National People's Congress created the Basic Law Drafting Committee (BLDC) in 1985. In June, the Standing Committee of the National People's Congress (NPCSC) approved the BLDC of 36 members from China and 23 members from Hong Kong, chaired by Chinese diplomat Ji Pengfei. Twelve of the 23 Hong Kong members were connected to the city's business and industrial sectors.

The Basic Law Consultative Committee (BLCC) composed of 180 Hong Kong community leaders was also established in the same year to collect views on the draft law in Hong Kong. Similar to the BLDC, the BLCC was also dominated by business and professional elites.

The first draft was published in April 1988 followed by a five-month public consultation exercise. The second draft was published in February 1989, and the subsequent consultation period ended in October 1989. The Basic Law was promulgated on 4 April 1990 by the National People's Congress, together with the designs for the flag and emblem of the Hong Kong Special Administrative Region (HKSAR).

On 4 June 1989, the BLDC's only two members representing the nascent pro-democracy camp, Martin Lee and Szeto Wah, suspended their participation after the military crackdown of the Tiananmen Square protests of 1989. Lee and Szeto had voiced support for student activists in Beijing and had led the Hong Kong Alliance in Support of Patriotic Democratic Movements of China, an organisation instrumental in assisting political dissidents leave China after the military crackdown on 4 June. In September, Lee returned to the BLDC after being urged to do so by many in Hong Kong. However, Beijing expelled Lee and Szeto from the BLDC in October and called them "subversives".

== Basic principles ==
The basic principles of Hong Kong's governance under Chinese sovereignty mirror those in the Sino-British Joint Declaration, and most of them are described in the first chapter of the Basic Law. The NPCSC has identified Articles 1 and 12 as the fundamental provisions of the Basic Law.

Article 1 states that Hong Kong as a part of the People's Republic of China but maintains legal and political systems separate from those in mainland China until 2047. Hong Kong has a high degree of autonomy and maintains its own executive, legislative and judicial branches. Judicial power includes final adjudication, which replaces the colonial judicial recourse of appealing to the Judicial Committee of the Privy Council in the United Kingdom with appeals to the Court of Final Appeal. The Hong Kong national security law incorporated into Annex III of the Basic Law overrides incompatible local ordinances and allows mainland Chinese courts to preside over cases that involve certain national security crimes.

Article 5 requires that the socialist system and policies to not be practised in Hong Kong and the capitalist system and way of life before the handover remain for 50 years after the handover, or 2047. The common law, rules of equity, ordinances, subsidiary legislation and customary law that govern certain land rights in the New Territories that were in force before the handover are maintained, except for any that contravene the Basic Law and subject to any amendment by the legislature.

Article 12 declares that Hong Kong enjoys a high degree of autonomy and comes directly under the Central People's Government.

Private ownership of property is also a right protected in Hong Kong.

Although the Basic Law was drafted to give effect to "One Country, Two Systems", on 10 June 2014, Beijing released a policy report asserting its authority over Hong Kong that started a conflict between "one country" and "two systems" by stating that the interests of China ("one country") should prevail over Hong Kong's constitutional autonomy ("two systems"). This ignited criticism from many people in Hong Kong, who said that the Communist leadership was undermining the Basic Law Article 8, in that it was reneging on its pledges to abide by the policy that allows for a democratic, autonomous Hong Kong under Beijing's rule.

== Autonomy under Chinese sovereignty ==
The Basic Law guarantees Hong Kong a high degree of autonomy under Chinese rule, with the exception of foreign affairs and defence which remains the purview of the Central People's Government.

=== Central government agencies in Hong Kong ===
Four agencies of the central government operate in Hong Kong. The Office of the Commissioner of the Ministry of Foreign Affairs was established under Article 13 of the Basic Law and began operating after the handover. The Liaison Office of the Central People's Government replaced in 2000 the Hong Kong branch of Xinhua News Agency, which served as the de facto diplomatic mission of China to Hong Kong since 1947. The Hong Kong Garrison of the People's Liberation Army began operating after the handover. The Office for Safeguarding National Security was established in June 2020 under the Hong Kong National Security Law.

Article 22 states that "no department of the Central People's Government and no province, autonomous region, or municipality directly under the Central Government may interfere in the affairs which the Hong Kong Special Administrative Region administers on its own in accordance with this Law".

In April 2020, the provision sparked a debate after the Liaison Office and the Hong Kong and Macao Affairs Office criticised pro-democratic legislators for delaying the election of the chairperson of the Legislative Council House Committee. Pro-democratic legislators said the offices violated Article 22 by commenting on the election of a chairperson in the local legislature. In response, the Liaison Office said both itself and the Hong Kong and Macao Affairs Office are not subject to Article 22 because they were authorised by central authorities to specialize in handling Hong Kong affairs and not what are commonly meant by "departments under the Central People’s Government".

Zhang Xiaoming has also said the Office of the National Security Commissioner is not subject to the restrictions in Article 22.

=== Effect of national laws ===
Except the Basic Law and the Constitution, national laws are not enforced in Hong Kong unless they are listed in Annex III and applied by local promulgation or legislation. When national laws are enacted locally by the Legislative Council, the local version adapts to the context of Hong Kong for the national law to have full effect. The NPCSC can amend legislation included in Annex III after consulting its Basic Law Committee and the Hong Kong government. Laws in Annex III must be those related to foreign affairs, national defence or matters not within Hong Kong's autonomy.

As of June 2020, Annex III includes laws on the designation of capital, national flag and anthem, territorial claims, nationality, diplomatic privileges and immunity, garrisoning of the People's Liberation Army and crimes involving national security. In May 2020, the National People's Congress announced that the NPCSC would enact a national security law tailored for Hong Kong in response to the 2019–2020 Hong Kong protests. The law was added to Annex III and promulgated without being passed in the Legislative Council.

National laws can be applied if they only affect an area in Hong Kong. In 2018, the Hong Kong West Kowloon station of the Guangzhou–Shenzhen–Hong Kong Express Rail Link was completed to include a section where mainland Chinese officials are allowed to exercise Chinese laws, an arrangement that intended to reduce the time needed for immigration. The effectiveness of Chinese law inside Hong Kong territory was challenged in the same year in the Court of First Instance. The court ruled that the Basic Law is a flexible constitution and as such can be interpreted for the needs of economic integration; the arrangement of having mainland Chinese laws in Hong Kong for the purposes of customs, immigration and quarantine does not contravene the "one country, two systems" principle.

=== National security law ===
Article 23 requires Hong Kong to enact local national security laws that prohibit treason, secession, sedition, subversion against the central government, theft of state secrets and foreign organisations from conducting political activities in Hong Kong. In 2003, the Hong Kong government tabled the National Security (Legislative Provisions) Bill 2003, which triggered widespread protest. The proposed legislation gave more power to the police, such as not requiring a search warrant to search the home of a suspected terrorist. After the demonstrations and the withdrawal by the Liberal Party of their support for the bill, the government shelved the bill indefinitely.

In 2024, the Hong Kong enacted the Safeguarding National Security Ordinance to implement Article 23. The bill includes five areas of national security crimes: treason, insurrection and incitement to mutiny, theft of state secrets and espionage, sabotage, and external interference.

== Fundamental rights and duties ==
The rights of Hong Kong residents are guaranteed by chapter 3 of the Basic Law. Article 39 also applies provisions of the International Covenant on Civil and Political Rights (ICCPR), the International Covenant on Economic, Social and Cultural Rights (ICESCR), and international labour conventions that was in force in Hong Kong before the handover. While the most parts of the ICCPR is ratified as the Hong Kong Bill of Rights Ordinance in largely identical language, no equivalent legislation was made to implement the ICESCR.

=== Civil rights ===
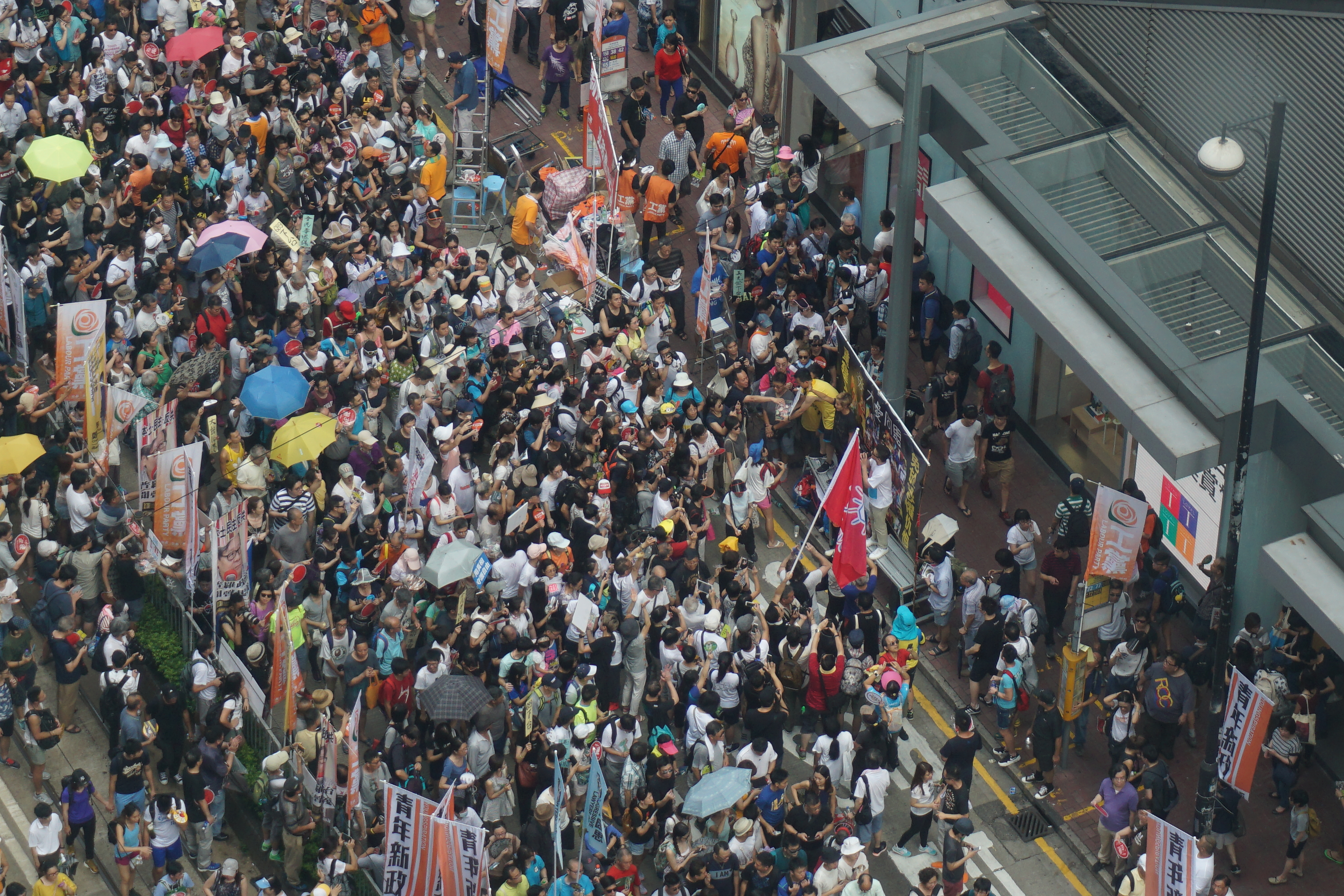
Annual demonstrations for various causes were common until a ban on gatherings during the COVID-19 pandemic and the Hong Kong national security law took effect in 2020.

Hong Kong residents are equal before the law. Hong Kong residents have, among other things, freedom of speech, freedom of the press and of publication; freedom of association, freedom of assembly, freedom of procession, of demonstration, of communication, of movement, of conscience, of religious belief, and of marriage; and the right and freedom to form and join trade unions, and to strike. The freedom of the person of Hong Kong residents shall be inviolable. No Hong Kong resident can be arbitrarily or unlawfully arrested, detained or imprisoned. Arbitrary or unlawful search of the body of any resident, deprivation or restriction of the freedom of the person are also prohibited. Torture of any resident and arbitrary or unlawful deprivation of the life of any resident shall be prohibited.

In late 2015, five staff members of a bookshop selling books and magazines banned in mainland China disappeared (see Causeway Bay Books disappearances). At least two of them disappeared while in mainland China, one while in Thailand. One member was last seen in Hong Kong, eventually reappearing in Shenzhen, across the Chinese border, without the necessary travel documents. While reaction to the October disappearances was muted, as unexplained disappearances and lengthy extrajudicial detentions are known to occur in mainland China, the unprecedented disappearance of a person from Hong Kong, and the bizarre events surrounding it, shocked the city and crystallised international concern over the possible abduction of Hong Kong citizens by Chinese public security bureau officials and their likely rendition, in violation of several articles of the Basic Law and the one country, two systems principle. The widespread suspicion that they were under detention in mainland China was later confirmed with apparently scripted video "confessions" and assurances by the men that they were remaining in China of their own accord. In June 2016, one of the five, Lam Wing-kee, said he and the others had been detained without due process and that Lee Po had been illegally abducted from Hong Kong by a "Central Investigation Team".

Article 95 provides for mutual judicial assistance between Hong Kong and mainland China; however, serious stumbling blocks, such as capital punishment stand in the way of a formal understanding of extradition. Additionally, Hong Kong authorities have ruled that Articles 6 and 7 of the Chinese Criminal Law does not give Hong Kong sole jurisdiction in criminal matters, particularly when a crime is committed across provincial or SAR borders. The current status quo is that Hong Kong will ask for the return of Hong Kong residents who have committed crimes in Hong Kong and are arrested in the mainland. A mainland Chinese resident who commits a crime in Hong Kong and flees back to the mainland, however, will be tried in the mainland. In cases of concurrent jurisdiction, the Central Government has demanded that the trial be held in the mainland. Prominent authorities, such as Albert Chen and Gladys Li, said that this situation had serious ramifications for judicial independence in Hong Kong.

=== Political rights ===
Permanent residents of the Hong Kong Special Administrative Region have the right to vote and stand for election in accordance with the Basic Law. Provisions of the International Covenant on Civil and Political Rights as applied to Hong Kong when the Basic Law came into effect were allowed to remain in force.

Article 45 stipulates that the Chief Executive shall be selected by election or through local consultations and be appointed by the Central People's Government, with the ultimate aim of selection by universal suffrage upon nomination by a representative committee under democratic procedures." However, Hong Kong has yet to implement universal suffrage for the elections, because the Basic Law states that the electoral method are subject to the "actual situation" of Hong Kong and "the principle of gradual and orderly progress".

Whether the 2007 chief executive election and the 2008 Legislative Council elections could be performed by universal suffrage was determined on 26 April 2004, when the NPCSC ruled out the possibility as it deemed Hong Kong not mature enough for such elections.

In 2014, the 31 August Decision by the NPCSC stated that starting from 2017, the selection of the Chief Executive may be implemented by universal suffrage upon nomination of candidates by a broadly representative committee and subject to appointment by the Central People's Government. It went on to state that such a person must love the country and love Hong Kong and that safeguards for this purpose should be provided for by the specific method of universal suffrage, without specifying what the safeguards were to be. The reform proposal encompassing this and other changes was rejected by the Legislative Council on June 18, 2015, after some pro-establishment legislators walked out.

== Political structure ==
The courts of Hong Kong are given the power to review acts of the executive or legislature and declare them invalid if they are inconsistent with the Basic Law.

The Chief Executive of Hong Kong can be selected by election or through consultations held locally and be appointed by the Central People's Government.

The term of the chief executive after their predecessor resigns was a question that emerged after Tung Chee-hwa resigned on 10 March 2005. The legal community and the pro-democracy camp said the term of the new chief executive should be five years, according to Article 46. However, the Hong Kong government, some Beijing figures and the pro-Beijing camp said that it should be the remaining term of the original Chief Executive, by a technicality in the Chinese version of the Basic Law, introducing the remaining term concept. The Hong Kong government sought an interpretation from the NPCSC on 6 April. The NPCSC ruled on 27 April that the Annex I of the Basic Law requires that if any Chief Executive should resign on or before 2007, the new Chief Executive should serve out the remainder of his predecessor's term. Hong Kong residents who favour autonomy view the "interpretation" from the Standing Committee as an intrusion into the Hong Kong legal system by the central government in violation of the spirit of the One Country, Two Systems policy, compromising the rule of law.

The Basic Law also guarantees the welfare and benefits of civil servants. According to the Article 100 of the Basic Law, the civil servants may remain in employment with pay, allowances, benefits and conditions of service no less favourable than before the handover. Article 107 stated the SAR Government should follow the principle of keeping the expenditure within the limits of revenues in drawing up its budget. Whether pay-cuts for civil servants and having a deficit budget are allowed under the Basic Law had been raised. During the economic downturn after 1997, there was a growing fiscal deficit (and, in 2007/08 a record surplus). The government imposed a pay-cut on the Civil Service during the economic downturn, and then sharply increased salaries during the recovery.

== External affairs ==
The Basic Law provides the Hong Kong government limited power to engage in international affairs. Under the name "Hong Kong, China", the Hong Kong government can enter into bilateral agreements with non-Chinese regions and international organisations related to certain fields, including commerce, trade, communications, culture, tourism and sports. As members of a Chinese delegation, government representatives can also engage in diplomatic negotiations and participate in international organisations and conferences that directly affect Hong Kong.

== Interpretation ==
The Basic Law can be interpreted either by the NPCSC or Hong Kong courts when deciding cases. However, the courts can only interpret parts of the Basic Law that are within Hong Kong's autonomy and are required to follow interpretations from the standing committee. As interpretations by the NPCSC are not retroactive, they do not affect cases that have already been decided.

As of May 2025, the NPCSC has interpreted the Basic Law on five occasions:

- Interpretation regarding Articles 22(4) and 24(2)(3) of the Basic Law, adopted on 26 June 1999 with relations to the right of abode;
- Interpretation regarding Annex I(7) and Annex II(III) to the Basic Law, adopted on April 6, 2004, over the procedure of amending the electoral methods of the Chief Executive and Legislative Council;
- Interpretation regarding the Second Paragraph in Article 53, adopted on April 27, 2005, regarding the term of office of a new Chief Executive succeeding a resigned predecessor;
- Interpretation regarding the First Paragraph of Article 13 and Article 19 of the Basic Law, adopted on August 26, 2011, before the Hong Kong Court of Final Appeal hands down its judgment on Democratic Republic of Congo v FG Hemisphere Associates LLC; and
- Interpretation of Article 104 of the Basic Law, adopted on 7 November 2016), regarding the requirements of lawful oaths and affirmations surrounding the oath-taking controversy over newly elected LegCo members.

Only one interpretation was sought by the Court of Final Appeal. The interpretation was requested in the 2011 case of Democratic Republic of Congo v FG Hemisphere Associates LLC and it concerned the jurisdiction of Hong Kong courts over acts of state, among other matters. The Government of Hong Kong sought two NPCSC interpretations on Basic Law provisions regarding the right of abode and the term of office of a new Chief Executive after his predecessor has resigned before the end of his term, in 1999 and 2005 respectively. The NPCSC had also interpreted the Basic Law twice on its own initiative, without being requested by any branch of government in Hong Kong. The first of the two occurred in 2004, and concerned the amendment of the chief executive and the Legislative Council election methods for 2007 and 2008 respectively. The second was issued in November 2016 on the substantive requirements of lawful oaths and affirmations as stipulated in Article 104 of the Basic Law.

It has been argued that the NPCSC's interpretations are effectively amendments. Hong Kong courts have nonetheless found NPCSC interpretations to have "supplementary" legislative effects in a manner consistent with Chinese jurisprudence. Similarly, the NPCSC's interpretive power could be used to modify a nearly unrestricted range of local laws without recourse by either Hong Kong courts or the government.

=== Legal principles ===
The basic principles for interpreting the Basic Law are described in Article 158 and case law. According to Article 158(1), the NPCSC has the power of final interpretation. This is consistent with the NPCSC's general power to interpret Chinese national laws as provided by Article 67(4) of the Constitution of China. As a national law, the Basic Law was drafted in Chinese, and its Chinese version takes precedence over the official English version when discrepancies arise. Before interpreting the Basic Law, the NPCSC must consult its subcommittee, the Committee for the Basic Law of the Hong Kong Special Administrative Region.

Hong Kong courts may also interpret the Basic Law when adjudicating cases, when the provisions addressed are within Hong Kong's autonomy. Hong Kong courts can also interpret provisions on matters the Central People's Government is responsible for or those related to the relationship between the Central government and Hong Kong, provided that the case is being heard by the CFA, that the interpretation will affect the judgments of the case, and that the CFA has sought a binding NPCSC interpretation on the matter.

To decide whether an NPCSC interpretation should be sought, the CFA applies a two-stage approach based on Article 158(3) formulated in Ng Ka Ling v Director of Immigration. The first stage concerns the "classification condition", which is satisfied if the provision to be interpreted concerns either affairs within the responsibility of the Central People's Government or the relationship between the Central Authorities and Hong Kong. Provisions satisfying the classification condition are "excluded provisions", suggesting that they cannot be interpreted by the CFA. When the court needs to refer to an excluded provision to construe a non-excluded provision, the CFA is not required to request an NPCSC interpretation on the excluded provision. Instead, the CFA applies the "predominant test", in which the court asks which provision is predominantly the one needed to be interpreted in the present adjudication. The second test concerns whether the "necessity condition" is satisfied. The condition is satisfied when the court needs the excluded provision to be interpreted and that the interpretation will affect the judgment on the case.

Hong Kong courts use the purposive approach to interpret the Basic Law. Since Hong Kong's legal system is separate from that of mainland China, its courts are bound to adopt the common law approach to interpretation. The courts construe the Basic Law's language to consider the provisions' context and purpose by finding its legislative intent; the legislator's intent alone is not considered the legislative intent. Ambiguities are resolved by accounting for the principles and purposes stated in the Chinese Constitution and other materials. Yet, the courts treat the Basic Law as a "living instrument" that adapts to changing needs and circumstances. While Hong Kong courts account for the historical context of the Basic Law, they also consider "new social, political and historical realities".

=== Disputes ===
Interpreting the Basic Law is politically contentious. Albert Chen has described NPCSC interpretations as the "major cause of constitutional controversies" since the handover.

The constitutional powers of the Hong Kong judiciary was first contested in HKSAR v Ma Wai Kwan, which was decided by the Court of Appeal 28 days after the handover. The applicants argued that the Provisional Legislative Council established unilaterally by Beijing before the handover was unlawful, and therefore the laws it enacted were void. The court dismissed this argument and explained that since a local court had no power to review sovereign acts under colonial rule, and the Basic Law did not expand its judicial power, it did not hold such power after the handover.

In the later Ng Ka Ling case, the CFA said Hong Kong courts had the power to review and invalidate acts of the National People's Congress or its standing committee if they were inconsistent with the Basic Law. Chinese officials criticised the judgment and led the Hong Kong government to ask the CFA to clarify its judgment. The court issued a statement saying that the judgment did not question the power of the NPC or its standing committee to "do any act which is in accordance with the provisions of the Basic Law and the procedure therein".

The Hong Kong government later sought an interpretation of Articles 22 and 24 from the NPCSC to avoid a potential influx of over a million mainland Chinese migrants (according to government estimates) into Hong Kong. This has triggered a debate on judicial independence in Hong Kong.

== Amendment ==
The National People's Congress has the exclusive power to amend the Basic Law. Amendments can be proposed by either the NPCSC, the State Council, or the Hong Kong government. For Hong Kong to propose amendments, the amendments require the support of two-thirds of the Hong Kong Legislative Council, two-thirds of the deputies representing Hong Kong in the National People's Congress, and the Chief Executive's approval. All proposals needs to be reviewed by the Committee for the Basic Law of the Hong Kong Special Administrative Region, and no amendments can "contravene the established basic policies of the People's Republic of China regarding Hong Kong".

=== Annexes I and II ===
According to Annexes I and II of the Basic Law adopted in April 1990, amendments could be made to the methods for selecting the chief executive and forming the Legislative Council for the terms subsequent to the year 2007 with the endorsement of a two-thirds majority of all the members of the Legislative Council and the consent of the Chief Executive. Amendments should then be reported to the NPCSC for approval or for the record.

In the NPCSC interpretation to the Basic Law adopted on April 6, 2004, the NPCSC stipulated the “five steps” of initiating political reform under Annexes I and II of the Basic Law:

- the Chief Executive submit a report on whether there is a need to amend the methods for selecting the CE for forming LegCo the Chairman of NPCSC;
- the NPCSC make a decision approving or vetoing amendments to electoral methods of the CE or LegCo;
- the Hong Kong government submit a motion concerning amendments of Annexes I and II to LegCo;
- LegCo approve of the motion concerning amendments with a two-thirds majority of all the members, and the CE give formal assent; and
- the NPCSC approve and file for record amendments to Annexes I and II.

Under the NPCSC's 2021 amendment of Annexes I and II, the NPCSC now exercises the power to amend Annexes I and II of the Basic Law. The “five steps” of initiating political reform by the HKSAR were no longer in force.

== See also ==
- History of Hong Kong
- Hong Kong Royal Instructions and Hong Kong Letters Patent
- Hong Kong Basic Law Article 69
- Macau Basic Law
- Judicial review
