= Hong Kong Letters Patent =

- Coat of arms of Hong Kong (1959-1997)

Overview
- Jurisdiction: British Hong Kong
- Created: 1843
- System: Crown colony (1841-1981) Dependent territory (1981-1997)
- Head of state: Monarchy of the United Kingdom
- Chambers: Legislative Council of Hong Kong
- Executive: Governor of Hong Kong
- First legislature: 26 June 1843; 182 years ago
- First executive: 26 June 1843; 182 years ago
- Authors: Victoria; George V; George VI; Elizabeth II
- Superseded by: Hong Kong Basic Law

Wikisource
- Hong Kong Letters Patent 1843; Hong Kong Letters Patent 1875; Hong Kong Letters Patent 1877; Hong Kong Letters Patent 1888; Hong Kong Letters Patent 1917

The expression 'Hong Kong Letters Patent' is most commonly used to refer to the Hong Kong Letters Patent 1917, one of the principal constitutional documents of British Hong Kong (others being the Hong Kong Letters Patent 1960, the Hong Kong Letters Patent 1982, the Hong Kong Letters Patent 1991 (No. 1), and the Hong Kong Royal Instructions 1917); however, it may also refer to any other Hong Kong Letters Patent or be used as a generic term covering all Hong Kong Letters Patent.

== List of all Hong Kong Letters Patent ==
- Hong Kong Letters Patent of 1843 (no formal short title)
- Hong Kong Letters Patent of 1875 (no formal short title)
- Hong Kong Letters Patent of 1877 (no formal short title)
- Hong Kong Letters Patent of 1888 (no formal short title)
- Hong Kong Letters Patent 1917
- Hong Kong Letters Patent 1939
- Hong Kong Letters Patent 1950
- Hong Kong Letters Patent 1955
- Hong Kong Letters Patent 1960
- Hong Kong Letters Patent 1967
- Hong Kong Letters Patent 1971
- Hong Kong Letters Patent 1976
- Hong Kong Letters Patent 1977
- Hong Kong Letters Patent 1982
- Hong Kong Letters Patent 1985
- Hong Kong Letters Patent 1986
- Hong Kong Letters Patent 1988
- Hong Kong Letters Patent 1990
- Hong Kong Letters Patent 1991 (No. 1)
- Hong Kong Letters Patent 1991 (No. 2)
- Hong Kong Letters Patent 1993
- Hong Kong Letters Patent 1994
- Hong Kong Letters Patent 1995
- Hong Kong Letters Patent 1996

== See also ==
- Estatuto Orgânico de Macau, Portuguese Macau equivalent
- History of Hong Kong
- Hong Kong Royal Instructions
