= Hong Kong Royal Instructions =

The expression 'Hong Kong Royal Instructions' is most commonly used to refer to the Hong Kong Royal Instructions 1917, one of the principal constitutional documents of British Hong Kong (others being the Hong Kong Letters Patent 1917, the Hong Kong Letters Patent 1960, the Hong Kong Letters Patent 1982, and the Hong Kong Letters Patent 1991 (No. 1)); however, it may also refer to any other Hong Kong Royal Instructions or any Hong Kong Additional Instructions ('Hong Kong Royal Instructions' amending the pre-existing Hong Kong Royal Instructions), or be used as a generic term covering all Hong Kong Royal Instructions and all Hong Kong Additional Instructions.

The Royal Instructions were issued by the British monarch with the royal seal and directly to the Governor of Hong Kong.

== List of all Hong Kong Royal Instructions and all Hong Kong Additional Instructions ==
- Hong Kong Royal Instructions of 1843 (no formal short title)
- Hong Kong Royal Instructions of 1886 (no formal short title)
- Hong Kong Royal Instructions of 1888 (no formal short title)
- Hong Kong Additional Instructions of 1896 (no formal short title)
- Hong Kong Royal Instructions 1917
- Hong Kong Additional Instructions of 1929 (no formal short title)
- Hong Kong Additional Instructions 1938
- Hong Kong Additional Instructions 1955
- Hong Kong Additional Instructions 1964
- Hong Kong Additional Instructions 1965
- Hong Kong Additional Instructions 1967
- Hong Kong Additional Instructions 1969
- Hong Kong Additional Instructions 1970
- Hong Kong Additional Instructions 1972
- Hong Kong Additional Instructions 1976
- Hong Kong Additional Instructions 1977
- Hong Kong Additional Instructions 1980
- Hong Kong Additional Instructions 1983
- Hong Kong Additional Instructions 1984
- Hong Kong Additional Instructions 1985
- Hong Kong Additional Instructions 1986
- Hong Kong Additional Instructions 1988
- Hong Kong Additional Instructions 1990
- Hong Kong Additional Instructions 1991
- Hong Kong Additional Instructions 1992
- Hong Kong Additional Instructions 1993 (No. 1)
- Hong Kong Additional Instructions 1993 (No. 2)

== See also ==
- History of Hong Kong
- Hong Kong Letters Patent
- Organic Statute of Macau, the Portuguese Macau equivalent
