= Human rights in Hong Kong =

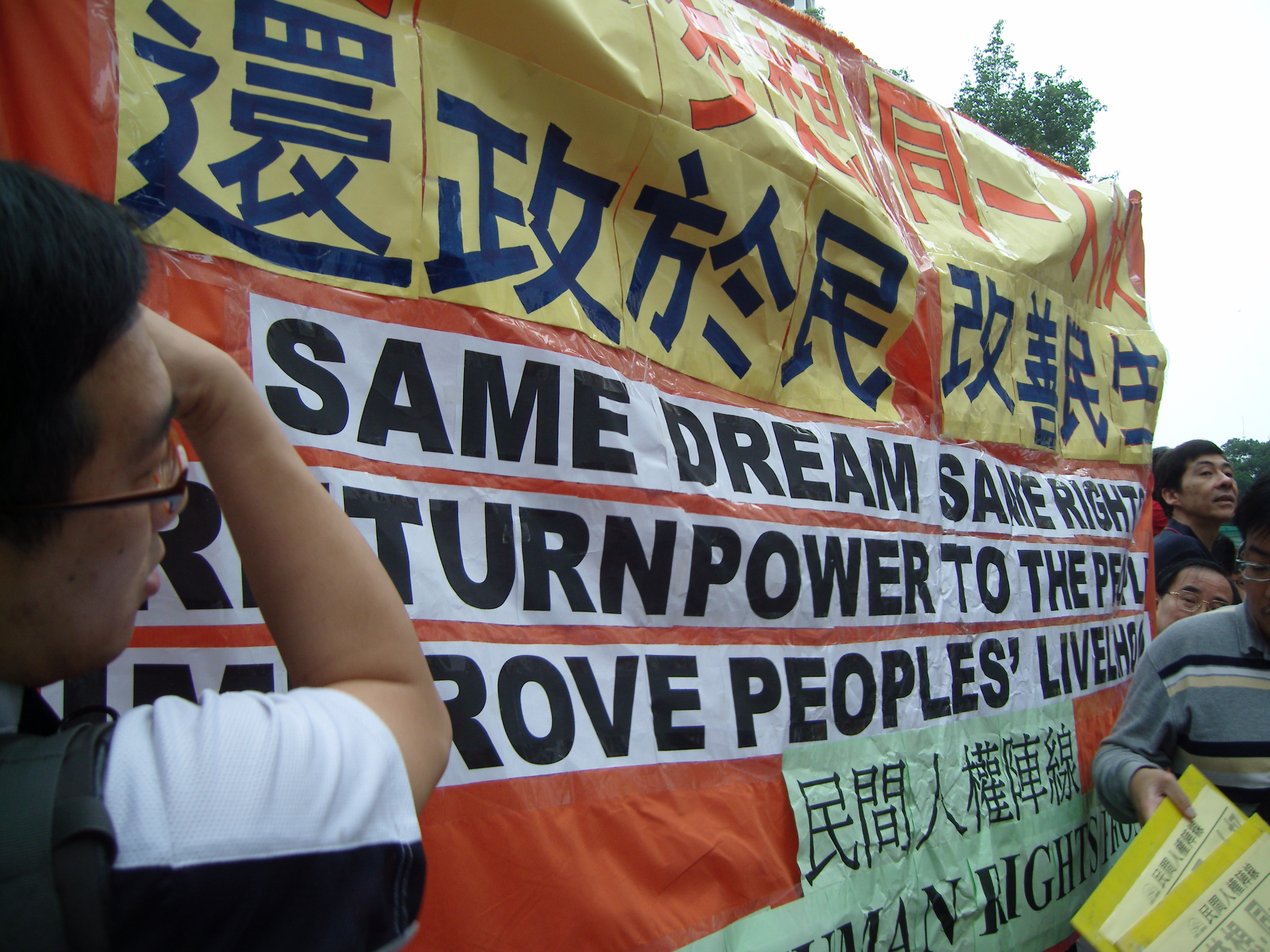
2008 Summer Olympics Torch in Tsim Sha Tsui, Hong Kong. Protest of Civil Human Rights Front.

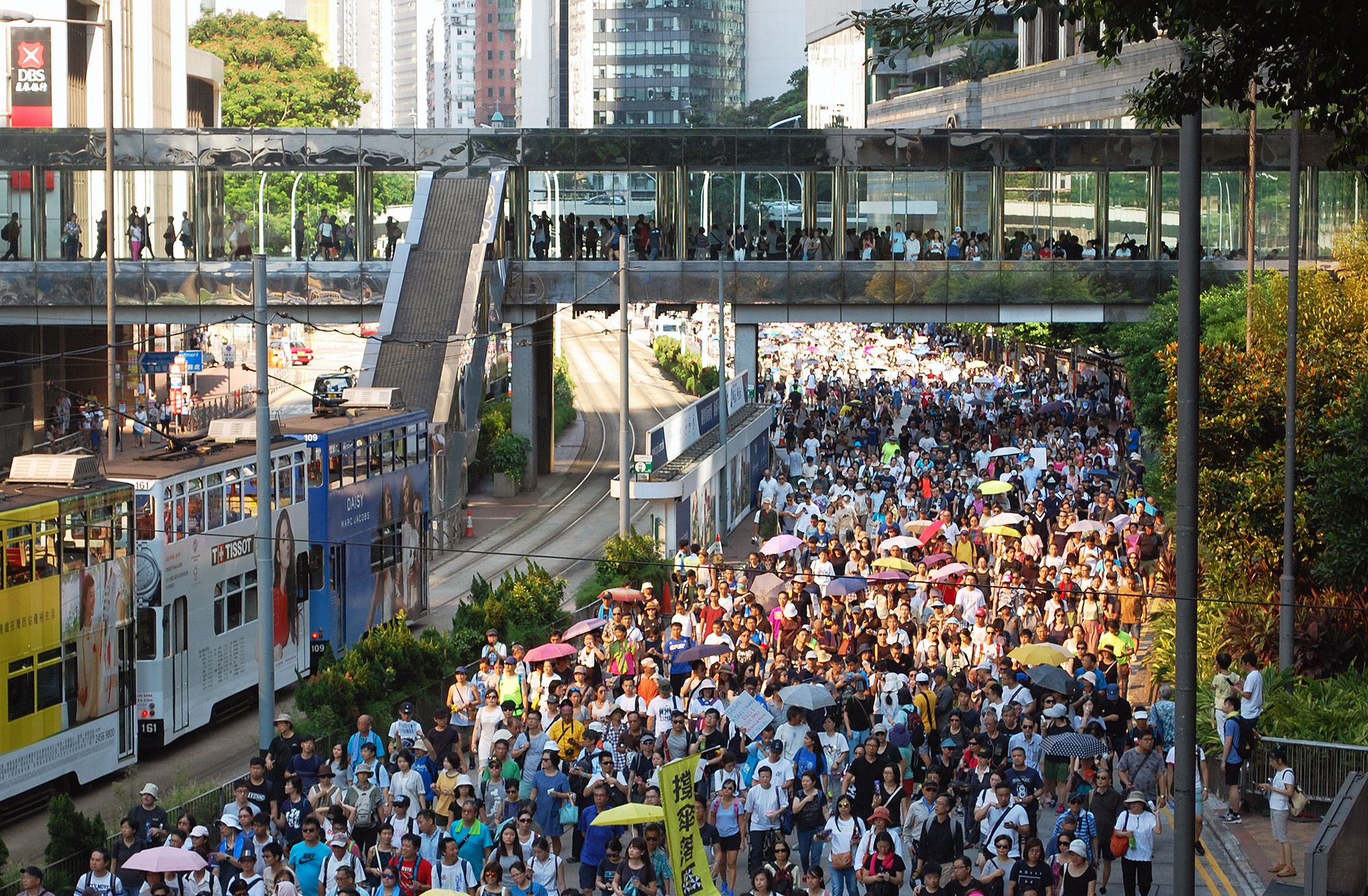
March in support of jailed Hong Kong pro-democracy leaders, 20 August 2017

Human rights protection in Hong Kong is enshrined in the Basic Law and its Bill of Rights Ordinance (Cap.383; the BORO). By virtue of the Bill of Rights Ordinance and Basic Law Article 39, the International Covenant on Civil and Political Rights (ICCPR) is put into effect. Any local legislation that is inconsistent with the Basic Law can be set aside by the courts. This does not apply to national legislation that applies to Hong Kong, such as the National Security Law, even if it is inconsistent with the Bills of Rights Ordinance, ICCPR, or the Basic Law.

Hong Kong is generally perceived to enjoy a moderate level of civil liberties. Although the Hong Kong government claims that it respects the human rights of citizens, there are significant concerns surrounding human rights in practice, particularly in the political sphere and press. There are concerns over the freedoms to the people which is restricted by the Public Order Ordinance, as well as strong domestic and international criticism of the national security law, perceived by many to have eroded certain rights. The United Nations and the UN human rights experts have repeatedly warned that offences under the NSL are vague and overly broad, facilitating abusive or arbitrary implementation. The police has been occasionally accused of using heavy-handed tactics towards protestors and questions are asked towards the extensive powers of the police. As to the right of privacy, covert surveillance remains the major concern. There is a lack of protection for homosexuals due to the absence of a sexual orientation discrimination law. There are also comments regarding a lack of protection for labour rights. Despite these concerns, the territory continues to rank high in certain metrics, including economic freedom and rule of law.

Human rights in Hong Kong occasionally comes under the spotlight of the international community because of its status as a special administrative region of China. This is occasionally used as a yardstick by commentators to judge whether the People's Republic of China has kept its end of the bargain of the "One Country, Two Systems" principle granted to the Hong Kong Special Administrative Region by its organic law, the Basic Law.

== Protection framework ==
=== Sino-British Joint Declaration ===
Under the Annex I (Section XI) of the Sino-British Joint Declaration, it stated that:

The Hong Kong Special Administrative Region Government shall protect the rights and freedoms of inhabitants and other persons in the Hong Kong Special Administrative Region according to law. The Hong Kong Special Administrative Region Government shall maintain the rights and freedoms as provided for by the laws previously in force in Hong Kong, including freedom of the person, of speech, of the press, of assembly, of association, to form and join trade unions, of correspondence, of travel, of movement, of strike, of demonstration, of choice of occupation, of academic research, of belief, inviolability of the home, the freedom to marry and the right to raise a family freely.

=== The Basic Law of the Hong Kong Special Administrative Region ===
Under the Basic Law, the constitutional documents of the Hong Kong Special Administrative Region, certain rights and freedoms of Hong Kong residents (including both permanent residents and non-permanent residents) are guaranteed and safeguarded in Chapter III of the law. These rights and freedoms include:

- equality before the law;
- permanent residents' right to vote and to stand for election in accordance with law;
- freedom of speech, of the press and of publication;
- freedom of association, of assembly, of procession and of demonstration;
- freedom to form and join trade unions, and to strike;
- the right from arbitrary or unlawful arrest, detention and imprisonment;
- the right from torture and unlawful deprivation of the life;
- the right from arbitrary or unlawful search of, or intrusion into resident's home or other premises;
- freedom and privacy of communication;
- freedom of movement within Hong Kong, of emigration to other countries or regions, and freedom to enter or leave Hong Kong;
- freedom of conscience;
- freedom of religious belief and to preach and to conduct and participate in religious activities in public;
- freedom of choice of occupation;
- freedom to engage academic research, literary and artistic creation, and other cultural activities;
- the right to confidential legal advice, access to the courts, choices of lawyers for timely protection of their lawful rights and interests or for representation in the courts, and to judicial remedies;
- the right to institute legal proceedings in the courts against the acts of the executive authorities and their personnel;
- the right to social welfare in accordance with law;
- freedom of marriage and the right to raise a family freely; and
- other rights and freedoms safeguarded by the laws of Hong Kong SAR.

Article 39 also expressly states that the provisions of the International Covenant on Civil and Political Rights (ICCPR), the International Covenant on Economic, Social and Cultural Rights (ICESCR), and international labour conventions as applied to Hong Kong shall remain in force in Hong Kong to the extent that they shall not contravene the provisions of the rights protected by the Basic Law.

Although these rights are explicitly vested in Hong Kong residents, non-residents in Hong Kong may also enjoy these rights and freedoms in accordance with law by Article 41.

In addition, Article 87 protects and preserves the rights previously enjoyed by parties to any criminal or civil proceedings, especially the right to fair trial by the courts without delay and the presumption of innocence until convicted by the courts. Article 105 protects the rights of property and the right to compensation for lawful deprivation of property of individuals and legal persons.

=== Hong Kong Bill of Rights Ordinance ===
The Hong Kong Bill of Rights Ordinance (Cap. 383)(the "Bill of Rights"), enacted in 1991, is the local adaptation of the provisions of the ICCPR as applied in Hong Kong. The Bill of Rights has largely been recognised by the courts as one of the constitutional documents alongside the Basic Law. However, the fact that the Bill of Rights was enacted in the form of an Ordinance (as a local primary legislation) means that the Legislature can amend or repeal the Bill of Rights by an ordinary enactment through ordinary legislative procedure, subject to judicial review. Furthermore, if any part of the Bill of Rights is held unconstitutional (i.e. any part contravenes the Basic Law), the courts are bound to strike down that part.

After the transfer of sovereignty, certain provisions of the Bill of Rights ceased to have effect, including sections 2(3) (duty to have regard to purpose of Ordinance in interpretation), 3(1) (duty to construe pre-existing legislation consistently with the Ordinance), 3(2) (pre-existing legislation that cannot be construed consistently is repealed) and 4 (all future to be construed so as to be consistent with the ICCPR as applied to Hong Kong). However, due to the entrenchment of the ICCPR as applied in Hong Kong in Article 39 of the Basic Law, the significance of the Bill of Rights Ordinance, which was modelled after the ICCPR, has been reinstated.

Some Basic Law rights overlap with the rights protected by the Hong Kong Bill of Rights Ordinance to certain extents while the provisions in the Bill of Rights and in the ICCPR are not identical. As a result, a right can be protected by either the Basic Law, the Bill of Rights, or the ICCPR as applied in Hong Kong at the same time.

=== Common law ===
Before the enactment of the Hong Kong Bill of Rights Ordinance, the protection of human rights in Hong Kong has largely relied on the common law of England. Civil liberties protection have a long history in English common law and are generally transcribed as human rights in modern time.

Under Articles 8 and 18 of the Basic Law, the laws previously in force in Hong Kong includes the common law rules which did not contravene the Basic Law and are part of the laws of HKSAR. Since colonial Hong Kong law defines "common law" as "the common law of England", civil rights principles found in the English law are now part of Hong Kong laws as "laws previously in force in Hong Kong" by operation of Articles 8 and 18 and as "common law in force in Hong Kong" pursuant to section 3 of the current Interpretation and General Clauses Ordinance (Cap. 1).

Those common law principles include those of statutory interpretation, such as the presumption that statutes do not operate retroactively (also codified in the Hong Kong Bill of Rights Ordinance), the doctrine that criminal enactments are to be strictly interpreted, the presumption that mens rea is required in a criminal offence, and the presumptions against a derogation of vested rights, ousting the court's jurisdiction, deprivations of private property without compensation and the presumption that the Legislature does not intend to legislate contrary to the State's international obligation.

By virtue of Article 81 of the Basic Law, the Hong Kong SAR also inherits a common law jurisdiction which emphasises on due procedure, nature justice, fair trial without delay, the presumption of innocence, the right of silence, the right of bail, the right against double jeopardy, the right against self-incrimination, and the duty to exercise a statutory power fairly. These subjects matter often found in judicial review proceedings in Hong Kong, a significant and noticeable feature of human rights protection framework in Hong Kong.

=== Judicial review ===
Article 11 of the Basic Law provides that "no law enacted by the Legislature of the Hong Kong Special Administrative Region shall contravene this Law." This Article has the effect that any Ordinance that contravenes the Basic Law shall be null and void. Hence, any legislation that contravenes Article 39 of the Basic Law, which entrenches the ICCPR, is also null and void.

It is well established that the Hong Kong Courts can now conduct the Marbury v. Madison type of judicial review to review the legislative and executive acts of the Hong Kong Special Administrative Region. This power exists before the handover since Hong Kong was governed by the Letters Patent, as opposed to Britain which has an unwritten constitution and where Parliament is sovereign.

In the landmark case of Ng Ka Ling and Others v. Director of Immigration, Chief Justice Andrew Li declared in emphatic terms:

In exercising their judicial power conferred by the Basic Law, the courts of the Region have a duty to enforce and interpret that law. They undoubtedly have the jurisdiction to examine whether legislation enacted by the legislature of the Region or acts of the executive authorities of the Region are consistent with the Basic Law and, if found to be inconsistent, to hold them to be invalid.

The approach of the courts towards the review of the constitutionality of legislation was laid down in R v. Sin Yau Ming, which adopted the Canadian approach in R. v. Oakes. Once there is a prima facie violation of a protected right, the government bears the burden of justifying the breach by showing:

1. The impugned provisions pursue a sufficiently important objective which is related to pressing and substantial concerns in a free and democratic society
2. There is a rational connection between the objective and the means chosen
3. The means adopted causes minimal impairment to the right of freedom in question
4. The effects on the limitation of rights and freedoms are proportional to the objective

However, controversies exist over whether the courts have the power to conduct a constitutional review of a legislative act of the National People's Congress or its Standing Committee. The Court of Final Appeal stated in Ng Ka Ling that the courts do have such a power. However, this declaration provoked heavy criticisms from the mainland authorities and developed into a constitutional crisis.

== Civil and political rights under domestic law ==
=== Right to life ===
The right to life is protected under Article 28 of the Basic Law and Article 2 of the Bill of Rights. In practice, the right to life is mainly protected by the criminal law (murder and manslaughter). No capital punishment has been carried out since 1966 and it has been formally abolished for all crimes in 1993.

=== Freedom of expression ===
The freedom of expression is protected under Article 27 of the Basic Law and Article 16 of the Bill of Rights. It is regarded as a fundamental right, but the Bill of Rights (and hence the ICCPR) provides that restrictions to it are justifiable provided that the restrictions are provided by law and are necessary for respect of the rights or reputations of others; or for the protection of national security or of public order (ordre public), or of public health or morals.

During a demonstration on 1 January 1998, civil activists Ng Kung Siu and Lee Kin Yun extensively defaced the National and Regional Flags. Certain portions were cut out or torn, black ink was daubed over the flags, black crosses were drawn, and the word "shame" was written on the flags. The two were charged under section 7 of the National Flag Ordinance and section 7 of the Regional Flag Ordinance, which provide that a person who desecrates the national or regional flags commits an offence. The constitutionality of section 7 of the National Flag Ordinance and section 7 of the Regional Flag Ordinance were challenged by the defendants. The defendants were convicted before the magistrate, and were bound over to keep the peace on his own recognisance of $2,000 for 12 months for each offence. The Court of Appeal quashed their convictions. The Court of Final Appeal unanimously held that the provisions were justified and not unconstitutional, as they merely ban the mode of expressing one's message but do not interfere with the person's freedom to express the same message in other ways. The convictions and the binding over ordered by the Magistrate were restored. The decision was heavily criticised by Raymond Wacks in his article "Our Flagging Rights" in Hong Kong Law Journal.

The Edison Chen photo scandal brought people to harbour doubts about the Control of Obscene and Indecent Articles Ordinance, which criminalises the distribution of obscene articles and the distribution of indecent articles without proper warnings to persons under 18. On 2 February 2008, Commissioner of Police Tang King Shing warned that sharing the photos via email, and even storing them on a personal computer, might be illegal, even if there was no record of distribution. This inaccurate statement of the law led to the objection of Leung Kwok-hung, who accused the police of sowing confusion and creating an atmosphere of "white terror" among netizens. Leung urged Commissioner Tang to clarify whether merely keeping the pictures violated the law. The police later amended Tang's statement, saying that looking at the photos or emailing them between mutual friends is not against the law, although posting them to Web sites is. The police's exuberance and inconsistency in cracking down on naked photos of celebrities triggered a public backlash from some netizens, who feel the police was curbing their freedom of expression in order to serve the powerful. The public reaction caused the government to table a review and public consultation of the Control of Obscene and Indecent Articles Ordinance.

Another incident that concerned the freedom of expression in Hong Kong is the Citizens' Radio incident, in which several civil activists were charged for operating a radio station without a license granted by the Chief Executive in Council, contrary to section 8 and 20 of the Telecommunications Ordinance. Constitutional challenge of the licensing regime was unsuccessful.

According to section 4 of the Places of Public Entertainment Ordinance (Cap. 172), no person shall keep or use any place of public entertainment without a licence granted under section 10 of the Ordinance. On 30 May 2010, the Hong Kong Alliance in Support of Patriotic Democratic Movements of China exhibited a replica of the Goddess of Democracy statue in Times Square in the absence of a license in order to commemorate the 1989 Tiananmen Square protests and massacre. It was confiscated by the police and after the ensuring scuffle two senior members of the Alliance were arrested for obstruction of a police officer in the due execution of his duty. Secretary for Food and Health York Chow Yat-ngok rebuffed claims of political oppression by saying the authority was merely enforcing the law after receiving complaints.

Despite the incidents mentioned above, Hong Kong is generally considered to enjoy a high degree of freedom of expression, with Freedom House commenting that it is a right that is "generally respected in practice, and political debate is vigorous".

On 14 March 2022, Amnesty International reported that UK-based organisation Hong Kong Watch has been threatened with criminal sanctions by the Hong Kong Police Force's National Security Department. Hong Kong Watch's website is blocked in Hong Kong. The Hong Kong government increasingly criminalises the work of civil society organisations, accusing groups who form international partnerships or do peaceful international activism.

In April 2026, human rights defenders in China, Hong Kong, and Kazakhstan faced legal penalties for peaceful expression. Xie Yang in Changsha was sentenced to five years for “inciting subversion,” and Raymond Chong in Hong Kong received one year under the national security law for “seditious” posts. Meanwhile, 19 Kazakh activists were convicted for protesting China's policies in Xinjiang, illustrating transnational repression linked to Chinese authorities.

On 29 June 2026, Human Rights Watch said that Beijing had tightened its control over Hong Kong in the six years since the National Security Law came into force. The rights organization said the law had limited dissenting voices and made public criticism of the government more difficult, citing the authorities' response to the 2025 Wang Fuk Court fire.

=== Freedom of assembly ===
The freedom of assembly is protected under Article 27 of the Basic Law and Article 17 of the Bill of Rights.

Article 17 of the Bill of Rights provides:

The right of peaceful assembly shall be recognised. No restrictions may be placed on the exercise of this right other than those imposed in conformity with the law and which are necessary in a democratic society in the interests of national security or public safety, public order (ordre public), the protection of public health or morals or the protection of the rights and freedoms of others.

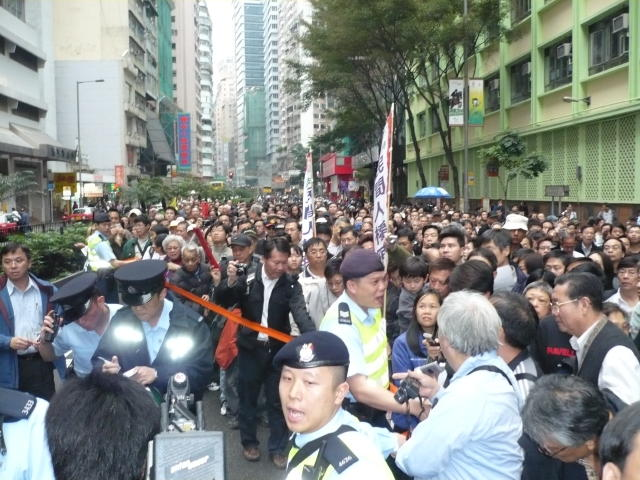
A protest in Hong Kong

Although there are no official figures in the number of protests, an analysis of newspaper reports has shown that the reported number of protests increased from under 100 before 2000 to 210 in 2004, and stayed at around 200 cases up to 2006, signalling the maturation of civil society. It has also been argued that the 1 July march in 2003, in which half-a-million residents took to the streets to protest the proposed national security bill and express strong general dissatisfaction with the government, halted the legislation of the proposed bill and allowed civil society to recognise its strength and potential in the policy-making process. The 1 July march is organised every year.

On 10 August 2020, the Hong Kong Police arrested billionaire businessman Jimmy Lai for allegedly collaborating with foreign forces. The police raided Jimmy's newspaper office. He is a prominent pro-government protestor. This is considered as the most high-profile arrest since the implementation of national security law. In February 2020, Jimmy was arrested on illegal assembly charges, but released on bail. Chinese state media, Global Times, reported that Jimmy Lai's sons and two senior executives of Next Digital had also been arrested.

==== Statutory restriction framework ====
This fundamental right is mainly restricted by the Public Order Ordinance (Cap. 245).

- A public procession consisting of more than 30 persons can only take place if the Police Commissioner has been notified a week in advance and the Commissioner has notified the organiser that he has no objection.
- The Commissioner can object to the public procession, but only if he reasonably considers that the objection is necessary in the interests of national security or public safety, public order or the protection of the rights and freedoms of others.
- The Commissioner may, where he reasonably considers it necessary in the interests of national security or public safety, public order or for the protection of the rights and freedoms of others, impose conditions in respect of any public procession notified under section 13A, and notice of any condition so imposed shall be given in writing to the organiser and shall state the reasons why such condition is considered necessary.
- Further requirements include the presence of the organiser at the procession, maintenance of good order and public safety, the prohibition of unreasonable use of amplification devices, compliance with directions given by a police officer for ensuring compliance with the Commissioner's requirements and the Ordinance's requirements etc.

On the other hand, certain statutory safeguards are present in the Ordinance.

- The Commissioner can accept the notice that is given in less than a week. If he decides not to, he must inform the organizers in writing as soon as possible and give reasons.
- The Commissioner can only reject an application if he considers objection is necessary for the statutory legitimate purposes. The "protection of public health & morals" purpose in the Bill of Rights is absent in the Ordinance, hence restricting the Commissioner's discretion.
- The objection must be given as soon as possible and within the statutory time limit.
- The Commissioner is obliged not to object if he reasonably considers that the relevant statutory legitimate purposes could be met by imposing conditions.
- The Commissioner's discretion may only be delegated to police officers of inspector or above.
- A decision by the Commissioner can be appealed to an Appeal Board. The decision of the Appeal Board can be judicially reviewed (but not appealed).

==== Constitutionality of the statutory framework ====
On 10 February 2002, a number of persons gathered at Chater Garden for a procession. Civil activist Leung Kwok-hung was the organiser of the procession but did not notify the Commissioner in advance. A police officer invited him to go through the statutory notification procedure, but Leung refused and was warned of the consequences. Initially, the procession consisted of 40 people, but it eventually grew to about 96 persons. They ignored police advice for several times, but the procession was at all times peaceful.

Leung and two others were later charged under section 17A(3)(b)(i) of the Public Order Ordinance for holding an unauthorised assembly. They were convicted before the magistrate and were bound over on their own recognisance for $500 for a period of three months; the conviction was upheld by the Court of Appeal.

At the Court of Final Appeal, the constitutionality of the entire statutory notification scheme was challenged. Chief Justice Li, Justice Chan PJ, Justice Ribeiro PJ and Sir Anthony Mason NPJ, having considered all the statutory restrictions on the freedom of assembly and the statutory safeguards listed above, held that the notification system was constitutional. However, they held that the norm of ordre public, which existed as a statutory legitimate purpose at that time, was too vague at a statutory level and hence could not be said to be prescribed by law. "Ordre public" was as a result severed, but the term "public order" was sufficiently precise to survive. They also remarked in dicta that the norm of "protection of the rights and freedoms of others" was too wide and did not satisfy the legal certainty requirement. They affirmed the convictions as the severance did not affect the conviction. Justice Bokhary PJ dissented, noting in his judgment that the whole statutory scheme should be struck down except the entitlement to notification.

==== Obstruction of a public place ====
On 14 March 2002, a number of Falun Gong practitioners were engaged in a peaceful demonstration outside the main entrance to the Liaison Office of the Central People's Government in the Hong Kong Special Administrative Region. Their number varied from 4 to 16 over time, hence rendering the statutory restriction scheme inapplicable. It was still possible to access the Liaison Office via a vehicular driveway. After warnings were ignored by the demonstrators, the superintendent in charge ordered his officers to arrest and remove them. The demonstrators resisted arrest but were eventually forcibly removed using heavy-handed tactics and loaded on board police vehicles. When they arrived at the police station, female demonstrators refused to leave the vehicles. Police officers took action to carry them off the vehicles but the demonstrators resisted and assaulted the officers.

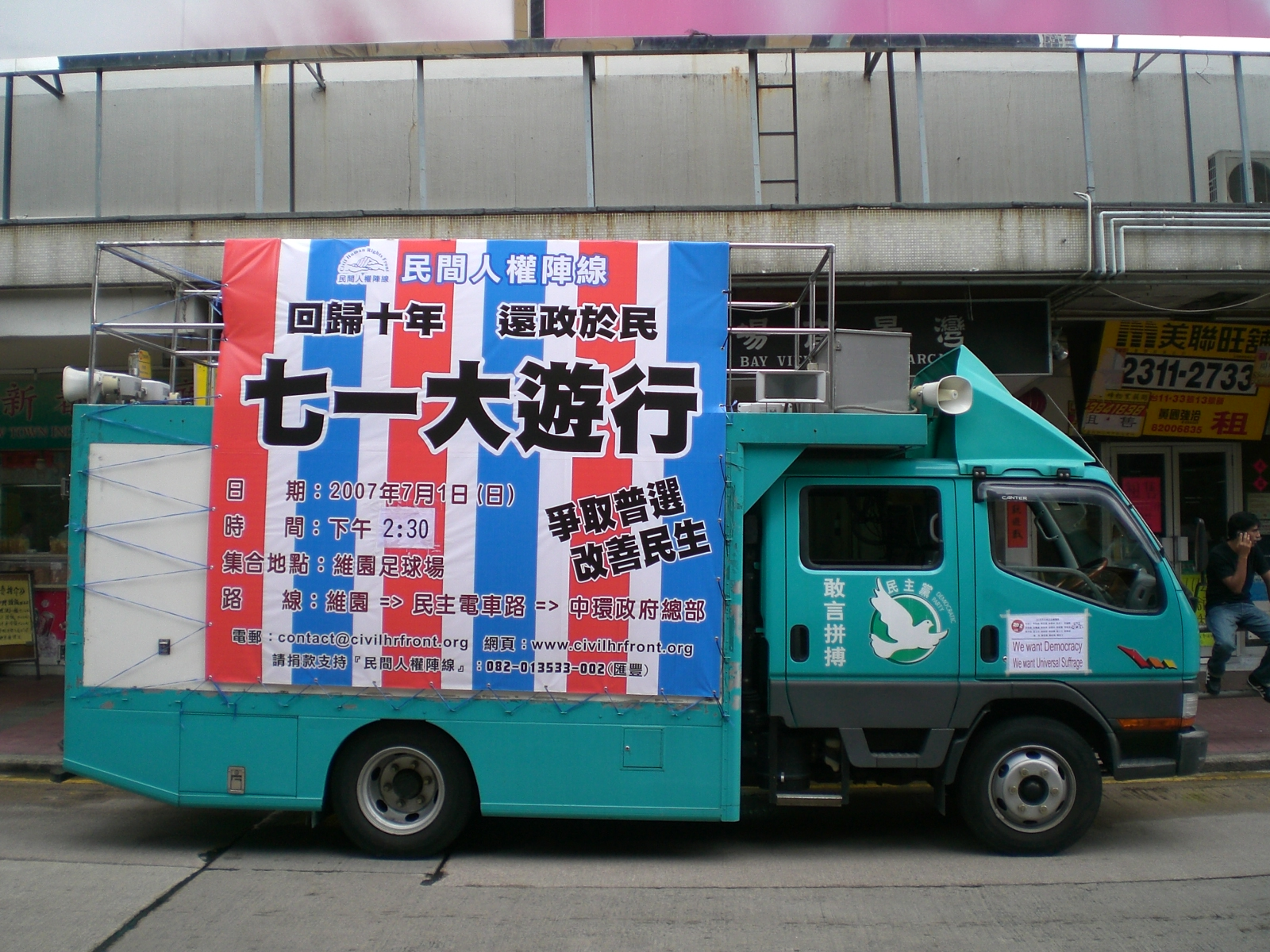

The demonstrators were charged with obstruction of public place. The Court of Final Appeal, constituted by the same judges in Leung Kwok-hung and Others v. HKSAR, allowed the appeal from the defendants and quashed all convictions. The court stressed that any physical obstruction of a public place must be accompanied by the element of "without a lawful excuse" in order to constitute an offence. If a person is merely using public place reasonably, they cannot be said to be acting without lawful excuse. When obstruction results from a peaceful demonstration, the constitutionally protected right is introduced into the equation for reasonableness. The court concluded the demonstrators were acting with reasonable excuse and acquitted them with regard to the offence of obstruction of public place.

=== Freedom of religion ===
The freedom of religion is protected by Article 32 of the Basic Law and Article 15 of the Bill of Rights.

The practice of Falun Gong is legal and tolerated in Hong Kong. However, in 2003 Falun Gong protestors were charged with obstruction of a public place after a peaceful demonstration outside the Liaison Office of the Central People's Government in the Hong Kong Special Administrative Region. They were initially convicted before the magistrate, but were eventually acquitted of all charges by the Court of Final Appeal. Furthermore, the HKSAR government was repeatedly accused of refusing entry to Falun Gong practitioners for allegedly political reasons.

The Anglican and Roman Catholic churches in Hong Kong freely appoint their own bishops, unlike in mainland China. Cardinal Joseph Zen, the former Bishop of Hong Kong, was outspoken about religious freedom and human rights in China.

=== Right to equality ===
The right to equality is protected by Article 25 of the Basic Law and Article 22 of the Bill of Rights.

A number of Ordinances have been enacted in order to give horizontal effect to the equality provisions in the Basic Law and the Bill of Rights. Examples include the Sex Discrimination Ordinance, the Disability Discrimination Ordinance, the Family Status Discrimination Ordinance and the Race Discrimination Ordinance. The Equal Opportunities Commission is a statutory body set up to implement these legislations and eliminate discrimination. The Race Discrimination Ordinance sparked fierce debates in Hong Kong because the definition of race as "race, colour, descent or national or ethnic origin of the person" left Mainland Chinese immigrants unprotected.

It was remarked by the Court that not all differential treatments constitute discrimination. If the differential treatment pursues a legitimate aim, is rationally connected to the legitimate aim and is no more than necessary to accomplish the aim, the differential treatment is justified and does not constitute discrimination. Only when the differential treatment is unjustified will it be deemed as discrimination.

==== Sexual orientation ====
Gay sex was legalised in Hong Kong in 1991. However, the Crimes Ordinance (Cap. 200) shows a tendency to discriminate against the gay community by stipulating different ages of consent for homosexual and heterosexual relations, and has been challenged for a number of times.

In Secretary for Justice v. Yau Yuk Lung Zigo, the constitutionality of section 118F(1) of the Crimes Ordinance was challenged. The section provides that it is an offence for a man to commit buggery with another man otherwise in private. The Court of Final Appeal unanimously held that the section was discriminatory as it constitute unnecessary differential treatment on the ground of sexual orientation. All persons, irrespective of sexual orientation, are subject to the common law offence of committing an act outraging public decency.

In Leung TC William Roy v Secretary for Justice, the constitutionality of section 118C of the Crimes Ordinance, which provides that a man who commits or suffers to commit buggery with a man under the age of 21 is liable on conviction on indictment to imprisonment for life, was challenged. The provision was held to be unconstitutional as while the age of consent for heterosexual couples is 16, male homosexual couples must reach 21 to have sex legally.

Despite fierce opposition from church groups, on 16 December 2009, Hong Kong's Legislative Council passed a bill extending its Domestic Violence Ordinance to apply to same-sex couples.

Despite the above victories of the homosexual community, same-sex marriage is not recognised in Hong Kong. There is also an absence of anti-discrimination legislation to create horizontal effect for the protection of homosexuals in human rights instruments, leaving homosexuals with no legal redress if discriminated against for their sexuality by private individuals.

==== Indigenous people ====
Hong Kong, despite being highly westernised, still retains Chinese culture and traditions, especially in the territory's New Territories. Such traditions are expressly protected in Article 40 of the Basic Law, which provides that the lawful traditional rights and interests of the indigenous inhabitants of the New Territories shall be protected.

In Secretary for Justice and others v. Chan Wah and Others, the second respondent complained of having been excluded by electoral arrangements from standing as a candidate in village elections on the ground he was not indigenous, although he had lived there all his life. It was held that as the village representative would represent the whole village, not just indigenous persons, the restriction was not reasonable and electoral arrangements were held unconstitutional accordingly.

The Hong Kong Government introduced the Small House Policy in 1972, which is an attempt to regularise village traditions. It allows indigenous male adult villagers, who is descended through the male line from a resident in 1898 of a recognised village, to be granted a plot of land at reduced premium in order to build a small house of specified dimensions within the 'V' zone and the environs or the village extension area of a recognised village. There have been demands to abolish this policy due to its being perceived as discriminatory, although such attempts have been strongly refuted by the Heung Yee Kuk.

==== Gender ====
In Secretary for Justice and others v. Chan Wah and others, the first respondent, who was non-indigenous and male and married to an indigenous and female villager, was excluded from voting in village elections. However, the arrangements were such that a non-indigenous, female villager married to an indigenous, male villager would have qualified as an indigenous villager with a right to vote. It was held such arrangements constitute unlawful discrimination on the ground of sex.

In Equal Opportunities Commission v. Director of Education, the Secondary School Place Allocation System was challenged as being discriminatory towards girls. To help boys overcome the late bloom, a scaling system was introduced whereby boys and girls scores were scaled separately. The result was that the final score of boys were boosted and those of girls reduced. Further the band cutting scores were different for each sex, with girls requiring a higher score to get into the top band. There were also gender quotas. The system was held to be unconstitutional.

Protection against sexual harassment at the workplace was put in place in 1995 through the enactment of the Sex Discrimination Ordinance.

There is international jurisprudence that supports a reading of the word "sex" in the prohibition of sex discrimination to include discrimination against transgender persons. The Hong Kong government has provided public funding for the treatment of transgender people covering counselling and, for those who proceed further, the provision of gender reassignment surgery. Post-operative transsexual persons can apply to change the gender on their identity cards and passports. However, a person's gender at law is determined by a birth certificate, which cannot be changed. In 2010, in W v Registrar of Marriages, Andrew Cheung J held that the references in the Marriage Ordinance to "man" and "women", properly interpreted, do not cover post-operative transsexual persons. It was further held that the Marriage Ordinance, which deny marriage to transsexual persons, was not inconsistent with the right to marry under the Basic Law or the Bill of Rights. Until W's appeal was allowed at the Court of Final Appeal, it was not possible for a transsexual person to marry someone of the same biological sex under Hong Kong law.

On 16 September 2013 Eliana Rubashkyn a transgender woman was discriminated and sexually abused for the airport's staff, forcing international organizations like United Nations and Hong Kong NGOs to provide assistance as a refugee becoming a stateless person, she suffered for more than 9 hours invasive body search.

=== Legal certainty ===
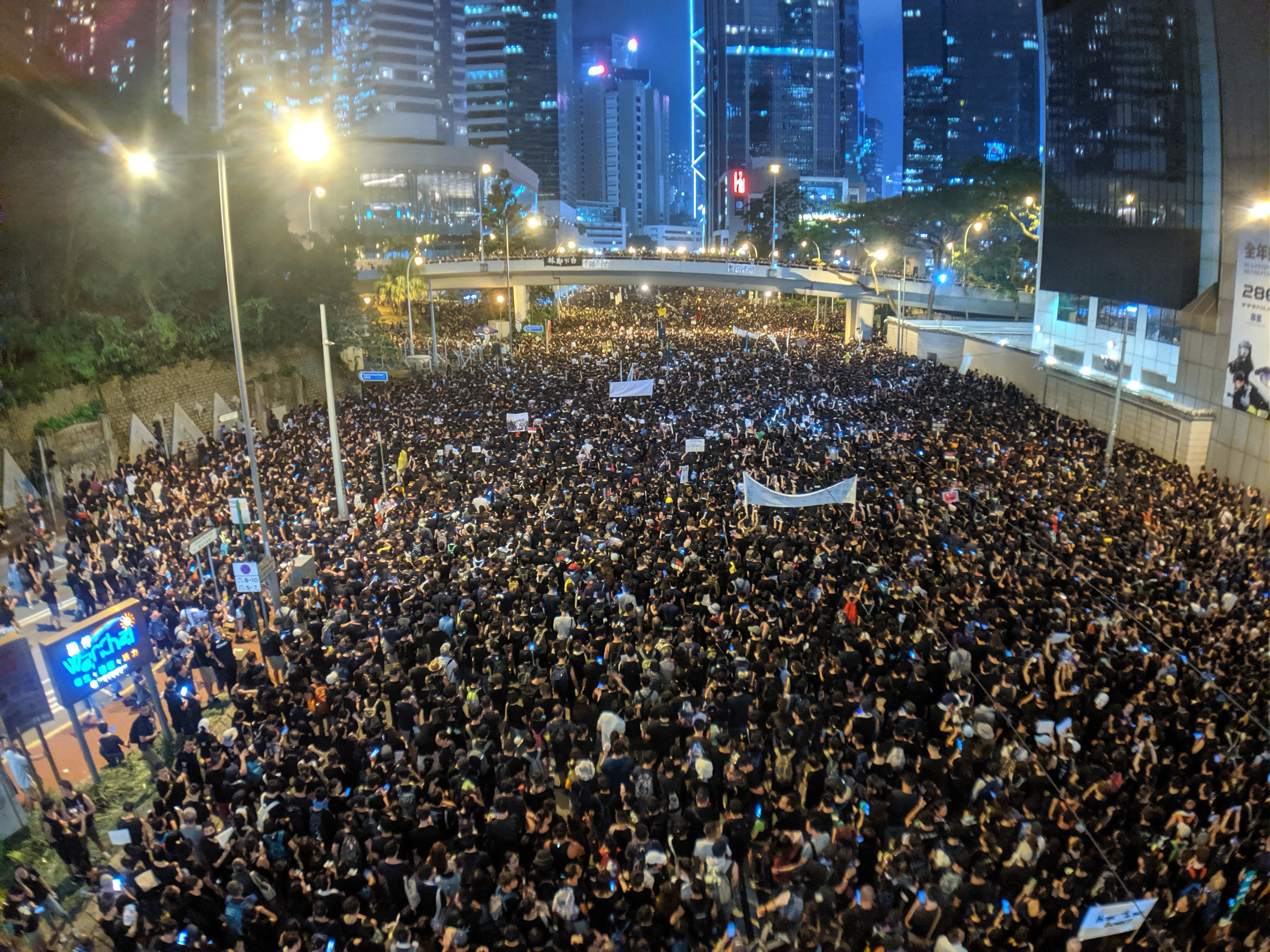
2019–20 Hong Kong protests

Article 39 of the Basic Law stipulates that the rights and freedoms of Hong Kong residents shall not be restricted "unless as prescribed by law". Sir Anthony Mason NPJ, in his judgment in the landmark case Shum Kwok Sher v. HKSAR, said, "International human rights jurisprudence has developed to the point that it is now widely recognised that the expression "prescribed by law", when used in a context such as art. 39 of the Basic Law, mandates the principle of legal certainty." In that case, the Court of Final Appeal laid down two requirements for legal certainty:

1. The relevant law must be sufficiently certain and precise to enable citizens to regulate his conduct
2. The relevant law must be adequately accessible

The Court remarked that a balance has to be struck between requiring the law to be formulated with sufficient precision and the desirability of avoiding rigidity in the law. The precision required will vary according to the context of the law; if it is impossible to formulate the law with absolute certainty, a description of the nature of the activity will provide sufficient notice. On the facts of that case, the Court held that the common law offence of misconduct in a public office was sufficiently certain.

=== Presumption of innocence ===
Article 87 of the Basic Law and Article 11 of the Bill of Rights provides that anyone charged with a criminal offence shall have the right to be presumed innocent until proven guilty according to law. This presumption is well established under the common law; the much-celebrated case of Woolmington v DPP laid down the basic criminal law principle that it is the duty of the prosecution to prove the defendant's guilt subject to the defence of insanity and statutory exceptions. If, at the end of and on the whole of the case, there is a reasonable doubt as to whether the defendant committed the criminal offence in question, the prosecution has not made out the case and the defendant is entitled to an acquittal.

However, as mentioned above, statutes may place the burden of proof on the defendant or make presumptions of facts which require the defendant to prove otherwise. In such circumstances, the reverse burden must be justifiable to avoid being struck down as unconstitutional. According to R v. Sin Yau Ming, a statutory provision is prima facie unconstitutional if the defendant has to prove the essential elements of the offence. Moreover, the reverse burden must be justified under the Oakes test.

This principle was partly affirmed by the Privy Council decision in AG v. Lee Kwong Kut when Lord Woolf said:

Some exceptions will be justifiable, others will not. Whether they are justifiable will in the end depend upon whether it remains primarily the responsibility of the prosecution to prove the guilt of an accused to the required standard and whether the exception is reasonably imposed, notwithstanding the importance of maintaining the principle which Art 11(1) enshrines. The less significant the departure from the normal principle, the simpler it will be to justify an exception. If the prosecution retains the responsibility for proving the essential ingredients of the offence, the less likely it is that an exception will be regarded as unacceptable.

=== Right to property ===
The right to property is protected by Article 6 of the Basic Law. Furthermore, Article 105 confers upon individuals the right to compensation for lawful deprivation of their property. Statutory protection of the right to property is found in the criminal offence of theft and in the Copyright Ordinance (Cap. 528) and the Prevention of Copyright Privacy Ordinance (Cap. 544) etc.

The town planning regime had been questioned as to its compatibility with this right. Whether zoning restrictions effected by the Outline Zoning Plans constitute a deprivation of property was considered by the Court of Appeal in Fine Tower Associates Ltd v Town Planning Board. The Conditions of Exchange limited the applicant's land use to industrial and/or godown, but the Draft Outline Zoning Plan designated 44% of the land as "Open Space" and 56% as "Other Specified Uses". The Court noted that a deprivation of land could occur not only by a formal expropriation of the land but also by an act which nullified any meaningful economic benefit in the land. It was held that the applicant had not lost all meaningful or economically viable use of the land, as it could still sell the land. The Court stressed that Article 105 had to be read in conjunction with Article 7, which authorises the government to manage the land in Hong Kong.

=== No arbitrary arrest, detention, imprisonment, search or seizure ===
Arbitrary arrest, detention, imprisonment, search or seizure are prohibited under Article 28 of the Basic Law and Article 5 of the Bill of Rights. No one shall be deprived of his personal liberty except on such grounds and in accordance with such procedure established by law. In practice, this area is governed by a mixture of common law and statutes.

At common law, false imprisonment is recognised as both a tort and a crime. Kidnapping is a crime at common law and is codified in section 42 of the Offence Against the Person Ordinance (Cap.212).

==== Power of arrest ====
It was confirmed in the case R v. To Kwan Hang & Another that the common law power of arrest is applicable to Hong Kong. Any person has the right to take reasonable steps to stop someone from "breaking or threatening to break the peace", and that "reasonable steps in appropriate cases will include detaining him against his will". Bokhary JA, as he then was, explained that a breach of peace occurs when a person "unlawfully resorts to violence which injures someone or damages property, or which puts someone in immediate danger of injury or property in immediate danger of damage".

The general power of all persons to arrest can also be derived from statutory sources. Section 101 of the Criminal Procedure Ordinance (Cap.221) stipulates that any person may arrest without warrant any person whom he may reasonably suspect of being guilty of an arrestable offence. An arrestable offence in Hong Kong refers to an offence for which the sentence is fixed by law or for which a person may be sentenced to imprisonment for a term exceeding 12 months. Section 101A of the Criminal Procedure Ordinance also allows any person to use reasonable force when effecting or assisting a lawful arrest.

The power of the police to arrest is much more extensive than that for citizens. They have the unqualified power to arrest pursuant to a warrant, and the police officer effecting the arrest is not responsible for any irregularities in the warrant as long as he is acting pursuant to it. A police officer can execute a warrant notwithstanding the warrant is not in his possession at the time, but the warrant shall, on the demand of the person affected, be shown to him as soon as practicable after the arrest. If no warrant is obtained, the police can only effect an arrest pursuant to section 50 of the Police Force Ordinance (Cap.232).

Section 50 allows a police officer to apprehend any person who (i) he reasonably believes will be charged with or who (ii) he reasonably suspects of being guilty of any offence for which the sentence is fixed by law or for which a person may be sentenced to imprisonment or if the service of a summons is impracticable. The constitutionality of this provision was reviewed in Yeung May-wan and Others v. HKSAR. The Court held that, in order to be compatible with Article 28 of the Basic Law, the first limb must be read as encompassing the second and did not eliminate the requirement for reasonable suspicion of guilt. The suspicion of guilt must be objectively reasonable, and the facts known by the police officer must be such that, if true, they would constitute all the elements of the offence in question. On the facts of that case, it was held that the arrests were not lawful and constituted false imprisonment as the police officers did not have in mind the element of "without lawful excuse" when arresting the Falun Gong protestors for obstruction of public place.

If a person is unlawfully arrested, he is entitled to use reasonable force to free himself. In the Yeung May-wan case, the defendants were therefore acquitted of wilfully obstructing a police officer and assaulting a police officer, even though there was actually a scuffle.

The person arrested must be delivered immediately to a police station.

The reasons for the arrest must be given to the arrested person before or at the time of the arrest.

==== Power to stop, detain and search ====
Section 54(1) allows a police officer to stop, detain and search any person as long as he "acts in a suspicious manner". This requirement of suspicion was said to be subjective in a 1980 case. Whether this remains good law is unclear as it was decided before the coming into effect of the Basic Law and the Bill of Rights and the judgment in Yeung May-wan. On the other hand, section 54(2) requires an objective reasonable suspicion.

==== Proof of identity ====
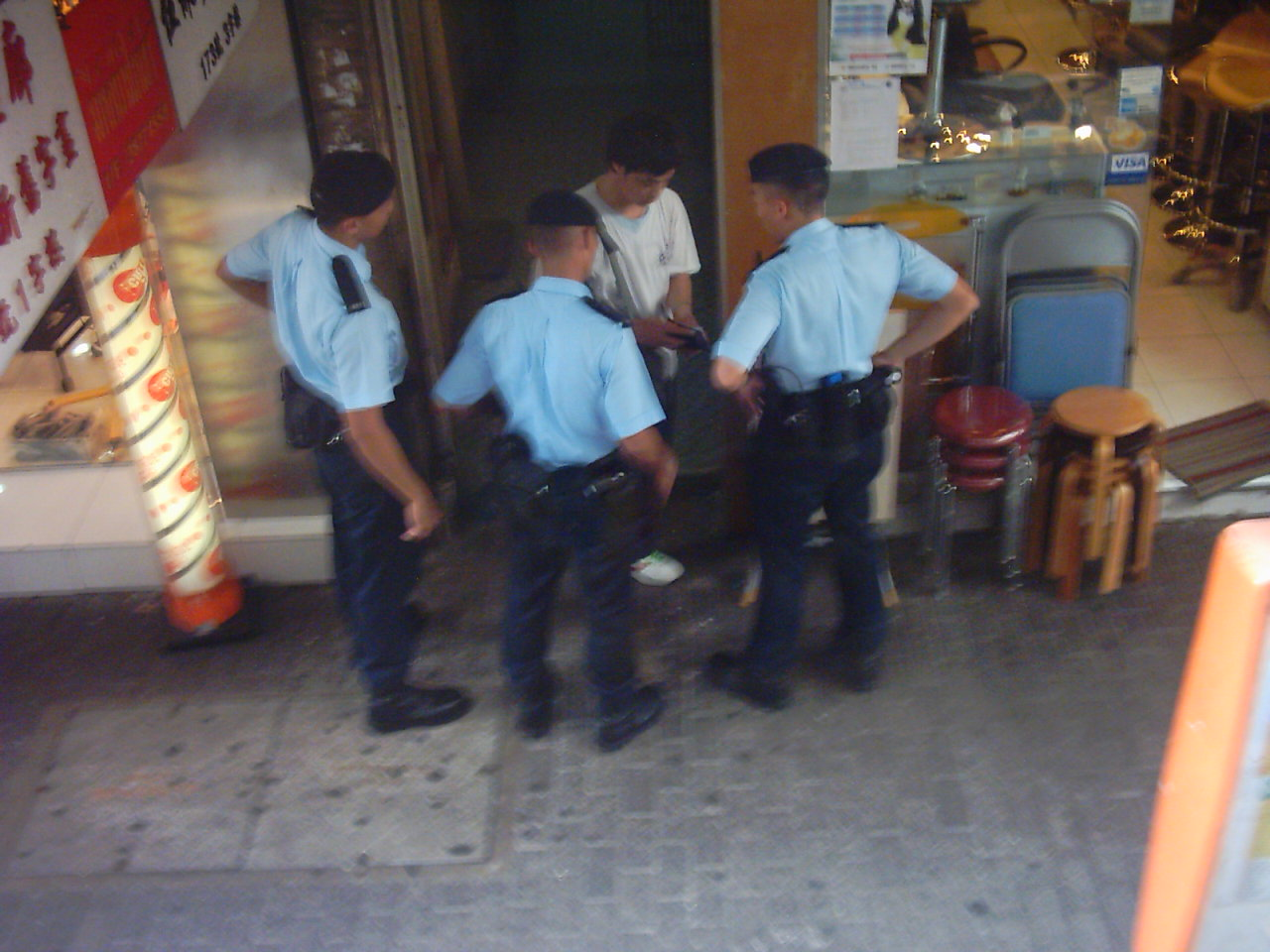
Police officers inspect the Identity Card of a citizen.

Any person aged 15 or above and is a holder of a Hong Kong identity card is required to have it with them at all times. There is no requirement that reasonable suspicion is needed if a police officer decides to demand the production of one's Identity Card, as long as the officer is in uniform or produces his appointment documentation. A police officer may arrest without warrant anyone who fails to produce his Identity Card. Failure to produce one's Identity Card is an offence punishable by a level 2 fine.

During the 2019 anti-extradition law amendment protests, police officers who failed to produce identification (by removing or refusing to produce identifying documents) yet still proceeded to arrest protesters – often violently – have resulted in a large number of individuals (including many innocent bystanders) who were arrested to be left with no recourse for the injuries and alleged torture they sustained during and after the arrest. As of September 2019, there are court cases attempting to rectify this.

The Hong Kong Human Rights Monitor has expressed its reservations as to the compatibility of this power with the Bill of Rights.

=== Right to privacy ===
The right to privacy is protected by Article 30 of the Basic Law and Article 14 of the Bill of Rights. At statutory level, protection is mainly offered by the Personal Data (Privacy) Ordinance, which has quite a limited scope. It stipulates six data protection principles which must be adhered to when dealing with personal data. Non-compliance with the principles is not a criminal offence but the party concerned may be served with an enforcement notice by the Privacy Commissioner. Non-compliance with an enforcement notice is punishable by a penalty of a fine at Level 5 and imprisonment for two years. The statute also creates a civil cause of action: an individual who suffers damage, including injured feeling, by reason of a contravention of the Ordinance in relation to his or her personal data may seek compensation from the data user concerned.

However, the powers of law enforcement officers to conduct covert surveillance had been largely unchecked before 2005. The legal basis for covert surveillance first came under scrutiny in two criminal cases in the District Court in 2005. To plug the loophole, the Chief Executive promulgated the Law Enforcement (Covert Surveillance Procedure) Order in August 2005. Leung Kwok-hung and Koo Sze Yiu, two political activists who claimed they had probably been targets of covert surveillance, brought an action to challenge the constitutionality of the practice of covert surveillance. They succeeded at the Court of First Instance, which held that section 33 of the Telecommunication Ordinance and the Order were both unconstitutional. The former created the power to intercept communications without adequate safeguards against abuse. The later failed to comply with the procedural requirement in the Basic Law. The decision was affirmed by the Court of Appeal and the Court of Final Appeal. The Court of Final Appeal suspended for six months the declaration of invalidity of the unconstitutional provisions, so that new legislation can be introduced to regulate covert surveillance. The Interception of Communications and Surveillance Ordinance (Cap. 589) was passed by the Legislative Council on 6 August 2006 after a 58-hour debate.

The law enforcement agencies have since been heavily criticised by the Honourable Mr Justice Woo V-P, the Commissioner on Interception of Communications and Surveillance. He remarked that some law enforcement officers were dishonest and unwilling to cooperate, behaved in an arrogant and presumptuous manner that was bordering on recalcitrance, and disobeyed orders by deleting relevant recordings of covert surveillance. It was also revealed that the government relied on a Canadian precedent to question the Commissioner's power to access covert surveillance recordings, and that a legislative amendment may be required to clarify the situation. An outrage was caused when it was revealed ICAC officers spent four days tapping a man's phone line although their target was a supposed to be female. Also revealed were four cases of unauthorised ICAC tapping of phone conversations between lawyers and their clients in 2007.

In 2010, it was reported that the police might have conducted covert surveillance over the phone conversations of participants of the anti-express rail demonstrations. When a district councillor questioned Police Commissioner Tang King Shing regarding the incident, Tang did not respond to the question directly, choosing to reply that the police acts according to law and adopts a stringent management of all covert surveillance operations.

=== Right to vote ===
The right to vote is protected under Article 26 of the Basic Law.

Previously, there was a general automatic and indiscriminate restrictions on prisoners' right to vote. A case was brought by two men, Chan Kin-sum and Choi Chuen-sun, who were in jail during the challenge, and Leung Kwok-hung, to challenge the restrictions. Justice Andrew Cheung ruled that inmates have the constitutional right to register as voters and cast their ballots while serving sentences, which was unjustifiably infringed by the indiscriminate ban.

Two League of Social Democrats activists also applied for a judicial review to challenge the legality of corporate voting on the grounds that it contravened Article 26 or was discriminatory in nature. Justice Andrew Cheung dismissed the applications, emphasising that his judgment was solely concerned with the constitutionality of corporate voting rather than the political wisdom of corporate voting or functional constituencies.

=== Right of abode ===
The definition of Hong Kong permanent residents is listed in Article 24 of the Basic Law, under which this class of persons enjoy the right of abode. However, the conflict between this Article and Article 22 led to extensive controversies and litigations.

Due to Hong Kong's proximity to mainland China, controversy has arisen in the right of abode of children born within the city by a mainland mother. Under current law, both the mother and the child is automatically granted right of abode. This has drawn criticism from Hong Kong citizens who argue that instead of wanting to give birth to their children in a better hospital, mainland mothers are exploiting the law in order to receive right of abode. Proponents for the law, including private doctors, claim that the law encourages medical tourism in Hong Kong thus providing long-term benefit for the city.

=== Right to travel and enter or leave the Region ===
The freedom of emigration, along with the freedom to travel and to enter or leave the Region, is guaranteed to Hong Kong residents under Article 31 of the Basic Law and Article 8(2) of the Bill of Rights. On the other hand, section 11(10) of the Immigration Ordinance provides that any permission given to a person to land or remain in Hong Kong shall, if in force on the day that person departs from Hong Kong, expire immediately after his departure.

The case of Gurung Kesh Bahadur v. Director of Immigration illustrated the problem of the provision. Mr. Bahadur, a Nepalese citizen, was a non-permanent resident of Hong Kong since 1995. Extensions of stay were made a few times, and the last one was to expire in January 1999. In October 1997, he flew to Nepal, returning to Hong Kong 7 days later. The Custom refused Bahadur's application for permission to land by virtue of section 11(10) of the Immigration Ordinance. His challenge of the provision succeeded in the Court of Final Appeal, which held that the provision was on itself constitutional but was unconstitutional when applied to non-permanent residents whose permission to stay had yet to expire. Hence the provision is no longer applicable to the above class of persons.

Since the right to enter the Region is a right guaranteed to Hong Kong residents only, the government has been accused of denying entry to politically sensitive persons who are not Hong Kong residents, including US-based activists in the 1989 Tiananmen Square protests, Falun Gong practitioners, and Tibetian independence supporters. High-profile persons denied entry include Taiwan President Ma Ying-jeou and Jens Galschiot, the sculptor of the Pillar of Shame that commemorates the 1989 Tiananmen Square protests and massacre.

On 21 June 2010, the Court of First Instance held that the requirement that, subject to a grace period of 56 days, an adult applicant for Comprehensive Social Security Assistance ("CSSA") must have resided in Hong Kong continuously for at least one year immediately before the date of application is unconstitutional since it unjustifiably infringes the freedom to travel and the right to equality. The case was brought by Hong Kong permanent resident George Yao Man-fai, who had been previously employed on the mainland. He was refused CSSA after he returned to Hong Kong following the termination of his employment. As a result, the Social Welfare Department announced it is shelving the one-year continuous residence requirement for new and repeat applications for Comprehensive Social Security Assistance.

== Economic, social and cultural rights under domestic law ==
=== Right to form trade unions and to strike ===
The right to form trade unions and to strike is provided by Article 27 of the Basic Law. The British government ratified the International Labour Conventions in 1949 but it was not until 1979 that the Conventions were partially enforced in Hong Kong.

There is a system of compulsory registration under the Trade Union Ordinance (Cap. 332). Under section 5(5) of the Ordinance, the officers of any trade union which fails to register are liable to a fine of $1,000 and imprisonment for six months. The Registrar has the power to monitor trade union activities through the supervision of union rule books, accounts and related documents. Trade unions are obliged by law to report to the Registrar where there are changes to the rule book, or the offices and branches operated by the trade unions. Such legal limits on the right to form trade unions were criticised by the Hong Kong Human Rights Commission.

Section 9 of the Employment Ordinance makes it clear that the fact that an employee takes part in a strike does not entitle his employer to terminate the employee's contract of employment. If a worker is dismissed for strike action, he or she would have the right to sue the employer for compensation. However, there is no legal entitlement to reinstatement.

The Hong Kong Liaison Office of the International Trade Union Confederation commented that although there is some protection in labour law, workers and unions have little opportunity for defending their rights in practice.

=== Right to social welfare ===
The right to social welfare is protected under Article 36 of the Basic Law, which further provides that the welfare benefits and retirement security of the labour force shall be protected by law. The Comprehensive Social Security Assistance is a form of social security provided by the Hong Kong government. The Mandatory Provident Fund is a compulsory saving scheme (pension fund) for the retirement of residents in Hong Kong: both employees and employers have to contribute, as long as the salary of the employee exceeds a statutorily stipulated level. However, there is no social insurance in Hong Kong.

The CSSA is only provided to residents of Hong Kong for at least seven years. A new mainland migrant whose Hong Kong husband died a day after her arrival challenged the seven years requirement. On 23 June 2009, the Court of First Instance held that the requirement was a justified restriction of the right to equality.

== Human rights under international law ==
The International Covenant on Economic, Social and Cultural Rights(ICESCR) and International Covenant on Civil and Political Rights (ICCPR) are in effect in Hong Kong by virtue of Article 39 of the Basic Law.

The ICESCR requires the government to take steps by all appropriate means and to the maximum of its available resources to achieve the rights in the covenants. The Court has repeatedly expressed the judicial opinion that such rights are positive in nature and are not enforceable unless domestic legislation has been enacted providing for the rights stipulated therein. Unlike the ICCPR, the ICESCR was not incorporated into domestic Hong Kong law and is only binding under international law. Hartmann J's description of the ICESCR as "aspirational" and "promotional" sums up the approach of the Hong Kong courts.

A number of ICESCR rights are incorporated in the Basic Law, such as the right to form trade unions and to strike (Article 27), right to social welfare (Article 36) and the right to benefit from the production of moral and material interest resulting from any scientific, literary or artistic production of which he is the author (Article 140).

Although the right to housing (Article 11 of the ICESCR) is not incorporated in any domestic law and is hence not an "entitlement", the Hong Kong Government has been providing public housing in the nature of "grace". In 1973, the government announced a 10-year plan to provide self-contained public housing to 1.8 million people. In 1995, public housing accommodated 2 million people, accounting for 45% of all housing. Public housing rental units are provided at subsidised rates (typically 20% of that in the private market), although their allocation is mean tested. The government introduced the Home Ownership Scheme in 1978 and the Sandwich Class Housing Scheme in the 1990s to allow families to own their own homes.

Although the right to health is contained in Article 12 of the ICESCR, there is again no entitlement as such in domestic Hong Kong law. However, Article 138 of the Basic Law requires the HKSAR to improve medical and health services by formulating policies to develop Western and Chinese medicine. Healthcare is provided by the government in the nature of "grace": the Accident & Emergency service and the in-patient (general acute beds) service provided by the Hospital Authority charges HKD180 per visit and HKD120 per day (plus HKD75 admission fee) respectively. 95% of Hong Kong people depend on the in-patient service provided by the public sector and 30% on the out-patient service provided by the public sector.

On February 11, 2026, a Hong Kong court convicted Kwok Yin-sang, the father of US-based democracy campaigner Anna Kwok, under the National Security Law, setting a precedent as the first such conviction of a family member of an exiled activist. The conviction, for handling funds tied to his daughter's activism, highlights China's increasing use of transnational repression. Human Rights Watch condemned the ruling as collective punishment and called for Kwok's release. There have been rising international demands for sanctions against officials responsible for such repression.

== Criticism of the police ==
=== Allegations of police brutality ===
Human rights groups have accused the Hong Kong Police of using heavy-handed tactics on non-violent protesters.

In 2002, Amnesty International cited the use of excessive force in an incident at Chater Garden where more than 350 police and immigrations officers stormed a group of 200 protesters. According to them, the protesters had been peacefully staging rallies against the Court of Final Appeal ruling that the majority of 5,114 people seeking residence in the territory did not have right to stay in Hong Kong and should return to mainland China.

In 2002, a group of Falun Gong practitioners who were protesting outside the Liaison Office of the Central People's Government in the Hong Kong Special Administrative Region were being forcibly removed from the street by Hong Kong Police with heavy-handed tactics. All were later charged with the offence of Public Place Obstruction. The Falun Gong defendants contested and appealed to the Court of Final Appeal. All defendants in this case (Yeung May-Wan & others v Hong Kong Special Administrative Region) were acquitted.

In 2008, police sergeant Thom Wing-hong punched a man in custody, Lik Sin-wan, in the head after the two argued over the way to conduct Lik's search. Lik, who had recently received a head operation, suffered serious injury as the strikes ruptured his reconstructed head bone. Thom then accused Lik of assaulting a police officer. Lik was later charged and appeared in court in August 2008 but was acquitted. The assault only came to light after the magistrate became suspicious of the circumstances of Lik's injury and ordered an investigation. Thom was charged with causing grievous bodily harm and sentenced to 10 months in prison.

In 2010, the Hong Kong Police came under heavy criticism for using pepper spray on anti-Guangzhou–Shenzhen–Hong Kong Express Rail Link protestors who were demonstrating outside the Legislative Council. Shortly after the Legislative Council's approval of the project, a group of demonstrators tried to break through a security cordon and were met with pepper spray. Secretary for Security Ambrose Lee subsequently condemned demonstrators who clashed with the police, saying that they "violated stability and law and order" and would not be tolerated. When the police was questioned by the Legislative Council for their use of pepper spray, assistant police commissioner Austin Kerrigan claimed the force used was not excessive. He accepted many protestors were peaceful, but said some had crossed the line. He did not directly answer the legislators' question as to whether ample warning was given before using pepper spray. It was revealed 7 police officers suffered injuries in the clash.

During the Umbrella Revolution in 2014, the Hong Kong Police faced allegations of police brutality in their handling of protesters. A report released in 2015 claimed that there were over 1,900 complaints filed against the police but only 21 were chosen to be investigated by the police. One incident where a protester was led by seven police officers to a remote location and subsequently beaten received significant media coverage and public outcry. The Hong Kong Police Union was criticised for holding a rally in support of the seven officers.

=== Political neutrality of the police ===
Political activist Christina Chan claimed that policemen visited her parents' home the day before the anti-high-speed rail demonstration and asked irrelevant questions. After being arrested for assaulting a police officer in the execution of his duty and subsequently bailed, she claimed the police did not ask any relevant questions to the incident, but harassed her instead.

In February 2010, immediately after Andrew To became the Chairman of the League of Social Democrats, he was charged with assaulting a police officer in the execution of his duty for his conduct during a demonstration on 1 October 2009. To claimed that certain video records showed that it was the police officers who punched him, and that he did not assault the police. He expressed his belief that the charge was based solely on political ground.

=== Independence of the police and accountability on policing ===
Regional police forces are not governed by a police authority consisting of elected officials and local members of public, but solely reports to the Security Bureau of HKSAR government, headed by appointed civil servants from the executive branch of government.

Complaints about the police are handled by Complaints against Police Office (CAPO), which is not independent but part of the Hong Kong Police Force. The Independent Police Complaints Council (IPCC) is set up to independently review every case handled by CAPO, though the IPCC has no investigative powers, and is not involved in hearing appeals to CAPO rulings.

Calls for reform, from both local non-government organisations, political parties as well as the UNCHR, have been largely ignored by the government.

== National security and Article 23 of Basic Law ==
Hong Kong SAR has the constitutional duty of safeguarding national security by virtue of Article 23 of the Basic Law. In 2002, in order to fulfil their constitutional duty, the government tabled an anti-subversion bill. However, as with national security legislation in many countries, civil libertarians feared powers in the proposed law would erode the fundamental freedoms of the people. Since 2020, with the backdrop of an authoritarian sovereign state, the laws has been used to suppress organisations which disagreed with the policies of either the Special Administrative Region or the Central Government.

== See also ==
- Police misconduct allegations during the 2019–2020 Hong Kong protests
- CCPL Human Rights Portal
- Democratic development in Hong Kong
- 2019–20 Hong Kong protests
- Transnational repression by China
