= Cho Man Kit v Broadcasting Authority =

Hong Kong court case

- Judiciary of Hong Kong
- Court: Court of First Instance
- Full case name: Cho Man Kit v Broadcasting Authority
- Argued: February 18–19, 2008
- Decided: May 8, 2008
- Citation: [2008] HKCFI 383 (CFI)
- Transcript: Text of judgment, Court of First Instance

Court membership
- Judge sitting: Judge Michael Hartmann

Cho Man Kit v Broadcasting Authority (Chinese: 曹文傑訴廣播事務管理局) was a Hong Kong High Court case that involved a challenge of a decision by the Broadcasting Authority that ruled a television documentary as offensive and partial in its treatment of same-sex marriage. The Court ruled that the decision was unlawful.

== Background ==
In July 2006, RTHK broadcast a documentary during family viewing hours named Gay Lovers. The documentary captured the lives of gay people and their difficulties, thoughts, and feelings in interviews with a lesbian couple and a gay man, Cho Man Kit, who was the applicant of the case. In the programme, the interviewees said they hoped that Hong Kong government would recognise same-sex marriage or civil union. The Broadcasting Authority then received complaints about the programme. In January 2007, after its Complaints Committee's investigation, the Broadcasting Authority handed down and published an admonition criticising that the programme did not fulfil the codes of practice issued by the Authority. In particular, the Broadcasting Authority believed that the programme was biased in a way of advocating homosexuality and same-sex marriage and should not have been shown during family viewing hours when the programme involved sensitive issues.

Later, different organisations, including Hong Kong Journalists Association, expressed great concern of the impact of the ruling on future editorial deliberations. The Information, Technology and Broadcasting Panel of the Legislative Council also passed a motion hoping that the Broadcasting Authority could revisit the admonition because the ruling created discrimination based on sexual orientation. However, on 23 March 2007, the Broadcasting Authority stated that the ruling was ‘functus’ and thus unable to revisit it. The applicant of the case then applied for judicial review. Judge Hartmann of the High Court heard the oral argument from the parties in February 2008. Three months later, the Court issued certiorari and struck down the admonition because of its discriminatory nature and the resulted unjustified interference on freedom of speech. On 4 July 2008, the Broadcasting Authority announced that it would not appeal.

== The Admonition ==
In the proceeding, the Broadcasting Authority argued that the issued admonition was based on two permissible findings: (1) nonconformity with impartiality standard and (2) inappropriate broadcasting time for children. The reasoning of its ruling were cited and reviewed in the court proceeding:

- Reviewed Reasoning 1:

…the programme had presented the minority’s personal experiences and feelings in the form of a documentary. The fact that only the merits of homosexual marriage were raised in the programme rendered the presentation one-sided. The absence of different views on homosexual marriage had the effect of promoting the acceptance of homosexual marriage. In this respect, the presentation was not impartial. The Broadcasting Authority was of the view that, since RTHK had accepted that reflecting the views of homosexuals was sensitive and could incite controversy, it was all the more important that the programme should observe impartiality.

- Reviewed Reasoning 2:

…homosexuality and the legalization of homosexual marriage were controversial issues which might be offensive and unsuitable for children to certain viewers in Hong Kong.

- Reviewed Reasoning 3:

Although there might not be anything frightening in the programme, the programme was unsuitable for broadcast within the Family Viewing Hours because children and young viewers watching the programme might have no knowledge of homosexuality and might be adversely affected by the partial contents of the programme if parental guidance was not provided.

_{(judgment, paragraphs 32, 78, 88 & 93)}

== Codes of Practice & Related Law ==
According to the Broadcasting Ordinance and the Broadcasting Authority Ordinance, the Broadcasting Authority was legally obligated to establish and enforce the Codes of Practice which monitored that all licensees and their programmes would be in conformity with ‘proper standards’. The following are the scripts of the Codes of Practice regarding impartiality and broadcasting schedule discussed in the court proceeding. _{(judgment, paragraphs 14 & 15)}

Codes of Practice: Programme Standards	Script
Chapter 2 Section 1	As a matter of principle, programmes should always be scheduled with an awareness of the likely audience in mind. Great care and sensitivity should be exercised to avoid shocking or offending the audience.
Chapter 2 Section 3	Violence is not the only reason for a programme to be considered unsuitable for family viewing. Other factors include bad language, innuendo, sex and nudity, scenes of extreme distress, the deliberate use of horror for its own sake, morbid sound effects intended to anticipate or simulate death or injury, the use of the supernatural or superstition so as to arouse anxiety or fear, torture, cruelty to children or animals,. Any matter likely to lead to hysteria, nightmares or other undesirable emotional disturbances in children and the use of crude slang.
Chapter 7 Section 1	The licensee should be vigilant on the likely effects of all material shown on television on children. Children covers a wide age range. It is, therefore, necessary for the licensee to exercise judgement on the capacity of children in different age groups in coping with the depiction and treatment of material which may not be suitable for them.
Chapter 9 Section 2	The licensees must ensure that due impartiality is preserved as respects news programmes and any factual programmes or segments thereof dealing with matters of public policy or controversial issues of public importance in Hong Kong ... Factual programmes are non-fiction programmes which are based on material facts. They can take the form of news, current affairs programmes, personal view programmes, documentaries and programmes adopting an investigative style of reporting.
Chapter 9 Section 3	Due impartiality requires the licensees to deal even-handedly when opposing points of view are presented in a programme. Balance should be sought through the presentation, as far as possible, of principal relevant viewpoints on matters of public importance. Programmes should not be slanted by the concealment of facts or by misleading emphasis.
Chapter 9 Section 4	In achieving due impartiality, the term ‘due’ is to be interpreted as meaning adequate or appropriate to the nature of the subject and the type of programme. Due impartiality does not mean that ‘balance’ is required in the sense of equal time or an equal number of lines in the script being devoted to each view, nor does it require absolute neutrality on every controversial issue. Judgment will always be called for by the licensees.

Broadcasting Authority Ordinance	Script
Section 9	(1) The Authority shall have the following functions... (d) to secure proper standards of television and sound broadcasting with regard to both programme content (including advertisements) and technical performance of broadcasts including, without limitation, restrictions on the time of day when programmes and advertisements may be provided, whether for the same or different licensees or broadcasts;

== Court’s Analysis ==
Before giving his final judgment, Judge Hartmann went through a series of analysis with three focuses:

1. Nonconformity with Impartiality Standards
2. Inappropriate Broadcasting Time for Children
3. Refusal to Revisit the Admonition

=== Analysis Focus A: Nonconformity with Impartiality Standards ===
==== What would be the standards of impartiality? ====
The Court recognised the fact that it would be for the Authority to determine what the statutory requirement of ‘proper standards’ of broadcasting and how it would codify the ‘proper standards’ concept. Still, the Court simply saw the Authority would and must take account of public opinion of reasonable Hong Kongers in the drafting process of the Codes or in the examination of complaints about any particular programmes. Judge Hartmann believed and further explained that those who were reasonable must understand that any consensus based on prejudices, personal aversions and dubious rationalisation could never justify any infringements of fundamental rights and freedoms, including free speech. It was accepted by the judge that there was no problem to require impartiality in broadcasting; moreover, he considered that the concept of impartiality not only meant that being balance and those definitions contained in Chapter 9 of the Codes but also meant being unbiased, unprejudiced, and fair. _{(judgment, paragraphs 72-76)}

==== Did the programme violate the standards of impartiality? ====
After reviewing the reasoning of the admonition, the Court discovered that the Authority's central concern of the nonconformity of impartiality was related to the topic of same-sex marriage raised by the participants appeared in the documentary. The Court believed that the only way for the programme to be impartial in the Authority's sense would be for RTHK to insert someone's views that homosexual marriages should not be desired. The rationale for the Court to have such impression was that the Authority criticised RTHK that the lack of different opinions on same-sex marriage had amounted to the same effect of advocating same-sex marriage in Hong Kong.

It was a fact that the programme was indeed lack of opposite views on same-sex marriage, but the Court did not see this insufficiency could have resulted in advocating same-sex marriage. Since the programme was a study of human condition, the Court simply accepted that it would be absolutely natural to record what would be important to homosexuals, including their hopes in legalising same-sex marriage. The Court equated this as normal as if ‘hunter-gatherers may express the hope that their lands will not be further encroached upon by farmers.’ Thus, the Court ruled the programme was indeed ‘impartial’. Then, Judge Hartmann concluded that the only answer for the Authority had come into the ruling of the programme's failure to be impartial for only one reason: the subject matter of the documentary was homosexuality. The judge criticised and humiliated the Authority by asking the question whether or not a similar ruling would have been reached if the programme had focused on hunter-gatherers. _{(judgment, paragraphs 78-85)}

==== Was the admonition discriminatory, and thus, imposing unjustified restrictions on free speech? ====
Referring back to the Authority's reasoning of the admonition_{(see above Reviewed Reasoning 2)}, the Court found out that the Authority had simply believed that homosexuality itself would be enough to offend certain viewers of the programme. Subsequently, the Authority was found that it had imposed unjustified restrictions on freedom of speech based on such belief. It was clear to the Court that such belief had been founded upon ‘a supposed consensus among certain people based on “prejudices, personal aversions and dubious rationalisations”.’ In his attempt to define the phrase ‘prejudices, personal aversions and dubious rationalisations’, Judge Hartmann quoted a passage of Professor Dworkin’ work which had also been cited by the Court of Appeal in Secretary for Justice v. Yau Yuk Lung Zigo:

Even if it is true that most men think homosexuality an abominable vice and cannot tolerate its presence, it remains possible that this common opinion is a compound of prejudice (resting on the assumption that homosexuals are morally inferior creatures because they are effeminate), rationalisation (based on assumptions of fact so unsupported that they challenged the community’s own standards of rationality), and personal aversion (representing no conviction but merely blind hate rising from unacknowledged self-suspicion). It remains possible that the ordinary man could produce no reasons for his view, but would simply parrot his neighbour who in turn parrots him, or that he would produce a reason which presupposes a general moral position he could not sincerely or consistently claim to hold. If so, the principles of democracy we follow do not call for the enforcement of a consensus, for the belief that prejudices, personal aversions and rationalisations do not justify restricting another’s freedom, itself occupies a critical and fundamental position in our popular morality.

_{(judgment, paragraphs 66, 86-92)}

=== Analysis Focus B: Inappropriate Broadcasting Time for Children ===
==== What would be the criteria of the suitability of programme broadcasting time for children? ====
The Court had no doubt that the Authority was allowed and obligated to establish guidance to regulate programmes broadcasting time for protecting young viewers. Therefore, the related regulations of broadcasting time within the Codes were accepted by the Court, particularly, Section 1 and 3 of Chapter 2 and Section 1 of Chapter 7 of the Codes. _{(judgment, paragraphs 93-98)}

==== Should the programme have been shown in a later hour? ====
The Court agreed that the programme involved homosexual issues which fell under the definition of ‘sex’ contained in Section 3 of Chapter 2 of the Codes; consequently, it would enable the Authority to recommend the programme be shown after Family Viewing Hours (4pm to 8:30pm). _{(judgment, paragraphs 104-108)}

=== Analysis Focus C: Refusal to Revisit the Admonition ===
==== Could the Authority go back and revisit the admonition? ====
The Authority explained to the Court that the admonition was ‘functus' because an effective memorandum corresponding to relevant statues limiting its powers did not provide a way for the Authority to reconsider the admonition or a way for RTHK to appeal against the admonition. However, the Court discovered that the memorandum had been based on consensus only and materially different in a lot of areas from the relevant statues. As a result, the Court ruled that the lack of appeal routes against the admonition could not operate under procedural laws. _{(judgment, paragraphs 111-115)}

== Holding ==
After a thorough analysis, the High Court gave the following orders:

- An order of certiorari to bring up and quash the admonition because of its homosexual discriminatory nature and the consequent unjustified restrictions on freedom of speech.
- An order of declaration which stated that the Authority had had no power to reconsider its determination was wrong; and in fact, the Authority did have power to reconsider or amend its determination.

_{(judgment, paragraph 116)}

== See also ==
- Leung TC William Roy v Secretary for Justice
- Secretary for Justice v Yau Yuk Lung Zigo
