= Leung TC William Roy v Secretary for Justice =

Leung TC William Roy v. Secretary for Justice
- Judiciary of Hong Kong
- Court: Court of Appeal
- Full case name: Leung TC William Roy v. Secretary for Justice
- Argued: 2005-07-21 to 2005-07-22
- Decided: 20 September 2006
- Citations: [2005] 3 HKLRD 657 (CFI), [2006] 4 HKLRD 211 (CA)
- Transcripts: Text of Judgement, Court of First Instance; Text of Judgement, Court of Appeal

Court membership
- Judges sitting: Chief justice Geoffrey Ma; Vice-President K H Woo; Justice Appeal Robert Tang

Leung TC William Roy v Secretary for Justice (Chinese: 梁威廉訴律政司司長) is a leading Hong Kong High Court judicial review case on the equal protection on sexual orientation and the law of standing in Hong Kong. Particularly, the Court sets up a precedent case prohibiting unjustified differential treatments based upon one's sexual orientation.

== Background ==
Prior to this case, the age of consent for homosexual men was 21 but not for heterosexual or lesbian couples, which was 16. Any gay man engaging in buggery with another man under 21 could be sentenced to life imprisonment, based on the provisions contained in the Crimes Ordinance. In 2004, Mr Leung, the applicant, a 20-year-old gay man, applied for leave for judicial review without being arrested or prosecuted. In his application, Mr Leung complained that the Crimes Ordinance discriminated against him based upon his sexual orientation and interfered with his private life by forbidding him to give physical expression to other gay men and, thus, making him unable to develop long-lasting relationships. The consequences were low self-esteem, loneliness, and sense of marginalisation. _{(Court of First Instance, para. 6)}

During the proceedings, Mr Leung challenged four provisions in the Crimes Ordinance infringing his constitutional rights to equality and privacy. After hearing the oral argument in July 2005, the Court of First Instance of the High Court handed down the judgment a month later. Mr Justice Hartmann ruled in favour of the applicant and struck down all four sections of the Crime Ordinance violating the guaranteed legal protections for equality and privacy.

Immediately afterwards, the local religious groups condemned the result and demanded the Government to appeal. In September 2005, the Government declared its plan to appeal. The hearings for appeal took place in July of the following year. On 20 September 2006, the Court of Appeal delivered its judgment and unanimously dismissed the case. The Government accepted the reasoning of the Court and did not appeal further.

== Related Law ==
In his application for judicial review, Mr Leung challenged Section 118C, 118F(2)(a), 118H and 118J(2)(a) of the Crimes Ordinance undermining his protected rights to equality and privacy under Articles 25 and 39 of the Basic Law and Articles 1, 14, and 22 of the Bill of Rights.

Crimes Ordinance	Title	Script
Section 118C	Homosexual buggery with or by man under 21	A man who- (a) commits buggery with a man under the age of 21; or (b) being under the age of 21 commits buggery with another man, shall be guilty of an offence and shall be liable on conviction on indictment to imprisonment for life.
Section 118F	Homosexual buggery committed otherwise than in private	(1) A man who commits buggery with another man otherwise than in private shall be guilty of an offence and shall be liable on conviction on indictment to imprisonment for 5 years. (2)An act which would otherwise be treated for the purposes of this section as being done in private shall not be so treated if done- (a) when more than 2 persons take part or are present
Section 118J	Gross indecency by man with man otherwise than in private	(1) A man who commits an act of gross indecency with another man otherwise than in private shall be guilty of an offence and shall be liable on conviction on indictment to imprisonment for 2 years. (2) An act which would otherwise be treated for the purposes of this section as being done in private shall not be so treated if done- (a) when more than 2 persons take part or are present
Section 118H	Gross indecency with or by man under 21	A man who- (a) commits an act of gross indecency with a man under the age of 21; or (b) being under the age of 21 commits an act of gross indecency with another man, shall be guilty of an offence and shall be liable on conviction on indictment to imprisonment for 2 years.

Hong Kong Bill of Rights Ordinance	Title	Script
Article 1	Entitlement to rights without distinction	(1) The rights recognized in this Bill of Rights shall be enjoyed without distinction of any kind, such as race, colour, sex, language, religion, political or other opinion, national or social origin, property, birth or other status.
Article 14	Protection of privacy, family, home, correspondence, honour and reputation	(1) No one shall be subjected to arbitrary or unlawful interference with his privacy, family, home or correspondence, nor to unlawful attacks on his honour and reputation. (2) Everyone has the right to the protection of the law against such interference or attacks.
Article 22	Equality before and equal protection of law	All persons are equal before the law and are entitled without any discrimination to the equal protection of the law. In this respect, the law shall prohibit any discrimination and guarantee to all persons equal and effective protection against discrimination on any ground such as race, colour, sex, language, religion, political or other opinion, national or social origin, property, birth or other status.

Basic Law	Script
Article 25	All Hong Kong residents shall be equal before the law.
Article 39	The provisions of the International Covenant on Civil and Political Rights, the International Covenant on Economic, Social and Cultural Rights, and international labour conventions as applied to Hong Kong shall remain in force and shall be implemented through the laws of the Hong Kong Special Administrative Region.

== Major Issues ==
In this case, 5 major issues were identified and discussed by the High Court:

1. Did the courts have the jurisdiction to hear ‘academic’ cases?
2. Did the applicant have the necessary standing to initiate the case?
3. Had homosexual men been discriminated against by some provisions within the Crimes Ordinance?
4. Could a piece of law be determined discriminatory but appearing on the face that they have been applied equally?
5. Should the courts let the legislature handle constitutional challenges on primary legislation?

== Arguments & Reasoning ==
=== Issue 1: Did the courts in Hong Kong have the jurisdiction to hear ‘academic’ cases? ===
- Holding:

Yes

- Argument:

The Government argued that the case was academic or hypothetical in its nature because the applicant had not been arrested or prosecuted. It had always been the doctrine of the courts not to hear such cases. Thus, the courts did not have the jurisdiction to hear the applicant's case._{(Court of First Instance judgement, paragraph 11; Court of Appeal judgement, paragraph 26 )}

- Reasoning:

The courts in Hong Kong did indeed have the jurisdiction to hear ‘academic’ cases, though the courts would normally dismiss such cases and demand the applicant to show some forms of harms or inabilities as a result of the Government's judgements, decisions, or actions. At the end of the day, the Court has the discretion to determine whether or not hear such cases. The reasons for the courts avoiding hearing academic cases were that it would be very dangerous for courts to make decisions on important legal principles without a full set of facts. When exceptional cases arose, the courts should carefully exercise the discretion to hear such cases and follow the instructions provided in Section 21K(2) of the High Court Ordinance:

An application for a declaration … by way of an application for judicial review, and on such an application the Court … may grant the declaration … if it considers that, having regard to- (a) the nature of the matters in respect of which relief may be granted by orders of mandamus, prohibition or certiorari;
(b) the nature of the persons and bodies against whom relief may be granted by such orders; and
(c) all the circumstances of the case,
it would be just and convenient for the declaration to be made…

Moreover, the Court expressed that individuals should never be asked to break the law in order to initiate a legal proceeding for the purpose of protecting their fundamental rights. In fact, it would be contradictory to the spirit of Article 35(1) of the Basic Law, which states:

Hong Kong residents shall have the right to … access to the courts… for timely protection of their lawful rights and interests … and to judicial remedies.

_{(Court of First Instance judgement, paragraphs 51–60; Court of Appeal judgement, paragraph 28)}

=== Issue 2: Did the applicant have the necessary standing to initiate the case? ===
- Holding:

Yes

- Argument:

The Government argued that the applicant of the case was not being arrested or prosecuted; thus, he lacked the sufficient interest and standing to bring a case before the court. And even though the applicant would have been considered to have the standing by the Court, the 3-month time limit required by the law for application for judicial review had passed long ago. _{(Court of Appeal judgement, paragraph 23)}

- Reasoning:

The Court of Appeal emphasised that the case involved the expression of love and intimacy by gay men towards one another; the case was therefore ‘about the status, moral citizenship and sense of self-worth of a significant section of the community.’ The Court then ruled that the applicant had sufficient interest to initiate the case because the Court was dealing with the issue which would have great impact on ‘the dignity of a section of society in a significant way.’

Thinking along the same lines as Judge Hartmann, the Court of Appeal concluded that the 3-month time limit would be relevant but not a compelling factor in this particular case. Quoting Judge Hartmann's comments, the Court of Appeal stated,

What must be remembered is that, even if there is a lack of promptness, the court possesses a discretion to condone it. In exercising that discretion, one of the matters to be taken into account will be the general importance of the matter raised. If the matter, as in the present case, goes to the fundamental human rights of a class of persons, that, it seems to me, in the interests of public policy, must be material._{(Court of Appeal judgement, paragraphs 29 & 39)}

=== Issue 3: Had homosexual men been unconstitutionally discriminated against by some provisions within the Crimes Ordinance? ===
- Holding:

Yes

- Argument:

The Government conceded up front that Section 118F(2)(a), 118H, and 118J(2)(a) were indeed unconstitutional in ways of infringing the applicant's rights to equality and privacy; however, Section 118C should still be valid because Section 118D, similar to Section 118C, equally applied onto and prohibited heterosexuals from engaging buggery under 21. _{(Court of First Instance judgement, paragraph 99)}

- Reasoning:

The Court agreed and accepted the Government's concession. The Court then moved to analyse Issue 4. _{(Court of First Instance judgement, paragraph 99)}

=== Issue 4: Could a piece of law be determined discriminatory but appearing on the face that they have been applied equally? ===
- Holding:

Yes

- Argument:

The Government argued that buggery should not be seen or recognised in the same way as sexual intercourse; and thus, the Court should not compare Section 118C, forbidding gay men from engaging buggery under 21, with the law forbidding heterosexual couples having sex under 16. Also, the Government believed the Court should hold Section 118C valid under the Basic Law because Section 118D, similar to Section 118C, equally applied onto and prohibited heterosexuals from engaging buggery under 21:

Section 118D of the Crimes Ordinance provides-
A man who commits buggery with a girl under the age of 21 shall be guilty of an offence and shall be liable on conviction on indictment to imprisonment for life.

_{(Court of Appeal judgement, paragraph 46)}

- Reasoning:

Citing Sutherland v UK and through reading of the text of the Crimes Ordinance, buggery is recognised to be a form of sex both in common law and in the Crimes Ordinance. Furthermore, the Court explicitly stated that sex was not only for procreation but also for expressing love and intimacy; buggery, for gay men, fit well into those definitions. Therefore, the Court could compare buggery and sex equally.

The Court and the Government agreed and treated ‘sexual orientation’ as a status or classification. Thus, Article 1 and 22 of the Bill of Rights and Article 25 and 39 of the Basic Law would scrutinise and forbid any unjustified discrimination based on one's sexual orientation. Agreeing with Judge Hartmann, the Court of Appeal quoted his judgement,

Denying persons of a minority class the right to sexual expression in the only way available to them, even if that way is denied to all, remains discriminatory when persons of a majority class are permitted the right to sexual expression in a way natural to them. During the course of submissions, it was described as ‘disguised discrimination’. It is, I think, an apt description. It is disguised discrimination founded on a single base: sexual orientation.

_{(Court of First Instance judgement, paragraphs 17–20; Court of Appeal judgement, paragraphs 43, 46–48)}

=== Issue 5: Should the courts let the legislature handle constitutional challenges on primary legislation? ===
- Holding:

Depends; but for this particular case, no.

- Argument:

The Government argued that whenever there would be constitutional challenges on primary legislation, the courts should follow the margin of appreciation doctrine and let the Legislative Council handle the matters. By pushing this argument forwards, the Government implied that the Legislative Council was in a better place to decide what was good or bad for the society; and thus, if the society believed that buggery under 21 for gay men should be condemned in order to fulfil the society's needs, then the courts should leave the matter for the Legislative Council to deal with. _{(Court of Appeal judgement, paragraph 52)}

- Reasoning:

In theory, the courts should always been impartial and independent from any interference. Judges were not elected through election, but the members of the Legislative Council were. Thus, the Legislative Council would be in a better position than the courts to determine what the society would need. The courts should recognise and appreciate that fact. Therefore, the courts should let the legislature deal with public policy. And this would be the margin of appreciation doctrine.

Nonetheless, the margin of appreciation given to the legislative should not be unlimited. If there would be a clear infringement of rights based upon race, sex, or sexual orientation, the courts shall scrutinise the proposed justification with intensity. The courts were obligated to invalidate unconstitutional laws. Following the margin of appreciation doctrine, the courts should also always bear in mind of their roles to protect minorities from the excesses of the majority. Thus, courts should be provided evidence of acceptable justification for any infringement on fundamental rights. In this case, the Court was not persuaded there had been any acceptable justification for the infringement of the applicant's rights. _{(Court of Appeal judgement, paragraphs 52–55)}

== Conclusion ==
In conclusion, the Court of First Instance made the following declarations and the Court of Appeal upheld that decision:

- Sections 118F(2)(a) and 118J(2)(a) are unconstitutional and invalid because of the inconsistency with Articles 25 and 39 of the Basic Law and Articles 1, 14, and 22 of the Bill of Rights

Hong Kong Bill of Rights Ordinance.

- Sections 118C and 118H are unconstitutional and invalid to the extent that they apply to a man aged between 16 and 21 because of the inconsistency with Articles 25 and 39 of the Basic Law and Articles 1, 14, and 22 of the Bill of Rights.

_{(Court of First Instance judgement, paragraphs 47, 99, 147, and 152; Court of Appeal judgement, paragraphs 56)}

== Significance ==
- The age of consent is thus set at 16 for both heterosexual and homosexual communities.
- Articles 1 and 22 of the Bill of Rights are interpreted to include sexual orientation. All government-sponsored unjustified discrimination based on sexual orientation will be deemed as unconstitutional.
- Hong Kongers will have the standing to initiate lawsuits against the Government without obvious harms or inabilities as a result of the Government's judgements, decisions, or actions, provided the legal challenges involving constitutional fundamental rights.

== See also ==
- Cho Man Kit v Broadcasting Authority
- Secretary for Justice v. Yau Yuk Lung Zigo
- LGBT rights in Hong Kong
