= Secretary for Justice v Yau Yuk Lung Zigo =

Secretary for Justice v. Yau Yuk Lung
- Judiciary of Hong Kong
- Court: Court of Final Appeal
- Full case name: Secretary for Justice v. Yau Yuk Lung Zigo and Lee Kam Chuen
- Argued: 2007-06-25 to 2007-06-26
- Decided: 2007-07-17
- Citation: [2006] 4 HKLRD 196 (CFA)
- Transcript: Text of Judgement, Court of Final Appeal

Court membership
- Judges sitting: Chief Justice Andrew Li; Permanent Judge Kemal Bokhary; Permanent Judge Patrick Chan; Permanent Judge Robert Ribeiro; Non-Permanent Judge Sir Anthony Mason

Secretary for Justice v Yau Yuk Lung Zigo and Another (Chinese: 《律政司司長訴丘旭龍》) was a controversial and significant judicial review court case in Hong Kong. The case was mainly about sexual orientation discrimination and legal procedures of potentially unconstitutional legislation. The case also led to the creation of a new judicial review standard regarding discrimination and, later on, the extension of protection against domestic violence for LGBT community.

== Background ==
In April 2004, the two male respondents in the case, who were 19 and 30 at the time, were found in engaging anal sex in a car parked beside a quiet and dark highway. The two were then prosecuted and charged with violations of Crimes Ordinance Section 118F(1) which prohibited sodomy in public. The case was the very first prosecution of Section 118F(1) since the enactment in 1991. The case was brought before a magistrate, Mr John T. Glass, whom then ruled Section 118F(1) unconstitutionally discriminatory against gay men and thus dismissed the charges.

The Government then appealed to the Court of Appeal. The appellate court subsequently upheld the magistrate's rulings. The case was, once again, appealed and brought before the Court of Final Appeal which ruled on the case in July 2007. The Court of Final Appeal upheld the lower courts’ rulings regarding the discriminatory nature of Section 118F(1) but revised the decisions relating to the legal procedures of a magistrate dismissing unconstitutional charges for future cases. _{(Court of Final Appeal judgement, paragraphs 4–5)}

== Relevant laws ==
Crimes Ordinance
Section	Title	Contents
§ 118F(1)	Homosexual buggery [sodomy] committed otherwise than in private	A man who commits buggery with another man otherwise than in private shall be guilty of an offence and shall be liable on conviction on indictment to imprisonment for 5 years.
Basic Law
Article		Contents
Article 25		All Hong Kong residents shall be equal before the law.
Article 39		The provisions of the International Covenant on Civil and Political Rights, the International Covenant on Economic, Social and Cultural Rights, and international labour conventions as applied to Hong Kong shall remain in force and shall be implemented through the laws of the Hong Kong Special Administrative Region.
Hong Kong Bill of Rights Ordinance
Section	Title	Contents
Article 1	Entitlement to rights without distinction	(1) The rights recognized in this Bill of Rights shall be enjoyed without distinction of any kind, such as race, colour, sex, language, religion, political or other opinion, national or social origin, property, birth or other status.
Article 22	Equality before and equal protection of law	All persons are equal before the law and are entitled without any discrimination to the equal protection of the law. In this respect, the law shall prohibit any discrimination and guarantee to all persons equal and effective protection against discrimination on any ground such as race, colour, sex, language, religion, political or other opinion, national or social origin, property, birth or other status.
Magistrates Ordinance
Section	Title	Contents
§ 27	Defects in and amendment of complaint, information or summons	(1) Where it appears to the adjudicating magistrate that there is- (a) a defect in the substance or form of any complaint, information or summons; or (b) a variance between the complaint, information or summons and the evidence adduced in support of it, he shall, subject to subsection (2)- (i) amend the complaint, information or summons if he is satisfied that no injustice would be caused by that amendment; or (ii) dismiss the complaint, information or summons. (2) The adjudicating magistrate shall amend the complaint, information or summons where- (a) the defect or variance mentioned in subsection (1) is not material; or (b) any injustice which might otherwise be caused by an amendment would be cured by an order as to costs, an adjournment or leave to recall and further examine witnesses or call other witnesses.... (4) In this section, 'amend' includes the substitution of another offence in place of that alleged in the complaint, information or summons.
§ 105	Application to state case on point of law	Within 14 clear days after the hearing and determination by a magistrate of any complaint, information, charge or other proceeding which he has power to determine in a summary way, either party thereto or any person aggrieved thereby who desires to question by way of appeal any conviction, order, determination or other proceeding as aforesaid on the ground that it is erroneous in point of law, or that it is in excess of jurisdiction, may apply in writing to the magistrate to state and sign a case setting forth the facts and the grounds on which the conviction, order or determination was granted and the grounds on which the proceeding is questioned, for the opinion of a judge. In the case of any determination which a magistrate has power to determine in a summary way and which relates to or is connected with an offence the Secretary for Justice shall notwithstanding that he may not be deemed to be a party, have a similar right to apply for a case to be stated as that hereinbefore afforded to the parties and upon the exercise of such right by the Secretary for Justice the complainant or informant shall cease to be a party to any further proceedings.

== The Justification Test ==
In assessing the constitutionality of Crimes Ordinance Section 118F(1), the Court of Final Appeal created the justification test. The test had been used in other cases but was only formally formulated and named in the case.

The Court ruled that equal protection was fundamental and essential to every Hong Kong citizen. However, the Court also recognised the fact that strict equal treatments may cause more harm than good, and different treatments may be warranted under certain circumstances. The Court thus created the justification test for assessing the legality of differential treatments. Any governmental differential treatments that could survive under the scrutiny of the justification test would be deemed constitutional. The Court laid out the requirements under the test:

1. The difference in treatment must pursue a legitimate aim. For any aim to be legitimate, a genuine need for such difference must be established.
2. The difference in treatment must be rationally connected to the legitimate aim.
3. The difference in treatment must be no more than is necessary to accomplish the legitimate aim.

_{(Court of Final Appeal judgement, paragraphs 19–22)}

== Major issues ==
Before hearing the oral arguments, the Court of Final Appeal identified two issues:

1. Is Crimes Ordinance Section 118F(1) discriminatory to the extent that it is inconsistent with the Basic Law and the Hong Kong Bill of Rights Ordinance?
2. What is the proper order to be made when the charge against the defendant is found to be unconstitutional?

_{(Court of Final Appeal judgement, paragraph 8)}

== Arguments and reasoning ==
=== Issue 1: Is Crimes Ordinance Section 118F(1) unconstitutionally discriminatory against gay men? ===
- Holding:

Yes

- Arguments:

The Government argued that Section 118F(1) was a formalised, enacted specific common law offence to protect the public from behaviours outraging public decency. The Government also indicated that the legislature must have taken considerations of genuine needs for enacting the law to regulate homosexual conduct. _{(Court of Final Appeal judgement, paragraph 26)}

- Reasoning:

The Court ruled that the Government's concept of a genuine need could be established through the mere act of legislative enactment was plainly wrong. The Court also ruled that the Government failed to identify and make out any genuine needs for enacting Section 118F(1). The Court thus held that Section 118F(1) failed to pass the first hurdle of the justification test. Consequently, Section 118F(1) was declared unconstitutional for infringing the respondents’ right to equality guaranteed under Articles 25 and 39 of the Basic Law and Articles 1 and 22 of the Bill of Rights Ordinance.

The Court agreed with the Government that the legislature had the right to pass laws protecting the community from outraging public sexual conduct, but the Court emphasised that the legislature should never have done so in a discriminatory way. The Court pointed out that Section 118F(1) was discriminatory by singling out and criminalising homosexual buggery but no similar laws against heterosexual buggery or other comparable heterosexual acts. And without any satisfactory justifications, the Court could only uphold the lower courts' rulings regarding the unconstitutional nature of Section 118F(1). _{(Court of Final Appeal judgement, paragraphs 25–30)}

=== Issue 2: What is the proper order to be made when the charge against the defendant is found to be unconstitutional? ===
- Arguments:

Both parties, the Government and the respondents, of the case stated that the Magistrate had mistakenly dismissed the charges after the declaration of Section 118F(1) unconstitutional. Both sides, at first, suggested different ways for properly dealing with the matter; however, they later on agreed that the Magistrate should have followed the instructions laid out in Section 27 of the Magistrates Ordinance. Thus, the Court was asked for clarification. _{(Court of Final Appeal judgement, paragraphs 61–62)}

- Holding:

The Court upheld the approach of following Magistrates Ordinance Section 27 suggested by the parties. The Court ruled that the Magistrate could have amended and substituted the unconstitutional charges of Section 118F(1) with noncontroversial offences through following the instructions provided under Magistrates Ordinance Section 27 without dismissing the case. And through following Section 27, the Court also indicated that the Magistrate could have utilised Section 105 of the Magistrates Ordinance and requested the opinion from a higher court regarding the constitutionality of Section 118F(1). _{(Court of Final Appeal judgement, paragraphs 63–67, 70-71 & 87)}

== Significance ==
- Equal protection against official sexual orientation discrimination is protected under the term “other status” of Articles 1 and 22 of the Bill of Rights Ordinance and thus Articles 25 and 39 of the Basic Law.
- Governmental sexual orientation discrimination was held equivalent to race and sex discrimination.
- The justification test was formulated.

_{(Court of Final Appeal judgement, paragraphs 11, 20–21)}

== Aftermath ==
The Equal Opportunities Commission suggested the Legislative Council to extend the protection covered under the Domestic Violence Ordinance to same sex couples in case of potential violations of this case's merits.
