= James Kerr Findlay =

Scottish judge (1936–2019)

The Honourable Dato Seri Laila Jasa James Kerr Findlay OBE QC JP GBS DSLJ

Judicial Commissioner of the Supreme Court of Brunei Darussalam
- In office 30 August 2001 – 2 November 2019

Judge of the Court of First Instance of Hong Kong
- In office 16 September 1994 – 2000

Director of Public Prosecutions of Hong Kong
- In office 1986–1989
- Preceded by: Joseph Duffy
- Succeeded by: Anthony Duckett

Solicitor General of Hong Kong
- In office 1984–1986
- Preceded by: Ray Astin
- Succeeded by: Frank Stock

Personal details
- Born: 25 January 1936 Scotland, United Kingdom
- Died: 2 November 2019 (aged 83) Cape Town, Western Cape, South Africa
- Spouse: Dawn Borchers (m. 1966; died 2019)
- Occupation: Judge and law officer

James Kerr Findlay (25 January 1936 – 2 November 2019) was a Scottish-born barrister and judge who was successively Hong Kong's Law Draftsman, Solicitor General, and Director of Public Prosecutions. He was appointed to the High Court of Justice (now the Court of First Instance) of Hong Kong in 1994.

After retiring from the bench in 2000, Findlay was appointed as a visiting judge and judicial commissioner of the Supreme Court of Brunei Darussalam from 2001 to 2019.

== Early years ==
Findlay was born on 25 January 1936, in Scotland. Most of his formative years were spent in Wales. When he was about 18 years old, he moved for Rhodesia and from 14 March 1954 to 13 March 1958, he worked as a constable before switching to the Department of Justice. While he and others were escorting a dignitary, an intoxicated farmer struck him and seriously hurt him. He was in and out of the hospital for several years. He made the decision to leave the BSAP at that point and studied law from his bed.

== Law career ==
At the age of 25, Findlay began his career as a stipendiary magistrate in Rhodesia from 1961 to 1964. He handled criminal cases, but the majority of his interlocutory cases and trials were civil in nature. He was called to the Bar in 1963. Following a number of professional changes, he was employed as a Parliamentary Counsel at the Lords Advocate's Chambers in London from 1978 to 1981. During this time, he was in charge of authoring a significant quantity of significant legislation, including the Criminal Justice (Scotland) Act.

=== Hong Kong ===
In 1981, Findlay began working at the Hong Kong Attorney General's Chambers as a Deputy Principal Crown Counsel. A year later, he was promoted to Principal Crown Counsel and given the position of Deputy Law Draftsman. In addition, he was in charge of creating a sizable quantity of weighty legislation, such as the Conveyancing and Property Ordinance, tax, landlord, and tenant laws. He was appointed to the position of Solicitor General from 1984 to 1986, and then Director of Public Prosecutions from 1986 to 1989.

Findlay joined the judiciary in March 1989 and served as a part-time Deputy High Court Judge for issues involving equity, building, and business. He was recommended for a permanent appointment as a High Court judge by the Judicial Services Commission the same year, but the appointment was blocked by then Chief Justice Sir Ti-liang Yang, because of Findlay's involvement in the Christopher Harris case, in which the Legal Department decided not to prosecute a senior prosecutor who was taped asking underage girls for sex. In March 1990, the commission decided not to recommend Findlay for appointment by a majority vote.

Having failed to join the bench, Findlay returned to the Legal Department in May 1990 initially as an assistant to the Attorney General, a post created for him. He was appointed Law Draftsman later that year.

Findlay was finally elevated to the High Court on 16 September 1994, and was succeeded as Law Draftsman by Tony Yen yuen-ho, who became the first local lawyer to serve as Law Draftsman. Findlay served as a permanent judge on the Commercial, Construction, and Arbitration list for the Hong Kong High Court between 1994 and 2000.

In 2007, Grenville Cross, the then Director of Public Prosecutions, wrote an article in the Hong Kong Lawyer magazine in which he criticised Findlay, his predecessor, as an "unlikely choice" for the job as DPP, writing that while Findlay "did his best", he was "not a natural advocate", and that his "limited knowledge of prosecuting" had proved to be "problematic". In response, Findlay described the article as "pompous and patronising", stating that he was asked to argue appeal and judicial review cases by both the prosecutions and civil divisions even while he was solicitor general and law draftsman, and that he had prosecuted and defended hundreds of criminal cases in Zimbabwe and Scotland.

=== Brunei ===
Findlay retired in March 2000, began working as a chartered arbitrator, and was chosen to serve as a visiting judge in the Supreme Court of Brunei Darussalam from 2001 till his death in 2022. Since his initial appointment as Judicial Commissioner of the Supreme Court on 30 August 2001, he has been a member of the Brunei Judiciary. Since 2001, he has presided over matters in the High Court as a visiting judge. Following an appeal at the High Court, a clerk at Radio Televisyen Brunei (RTB) who was found guilty of filing false payment claims against her employer was declared not guilty on 4 April 2015. As Judicial Commissioner Findlay, who heard the appeal, noted, "there were too many unsatisfactory features" in the case, the Court overturned the conviction.

The High Court in this city convicted another former employee of Brunei Shell Petroleum (BSP) guilty of 49 counts of corruption on 19 February 2017, and she was given a six-year prison sentence. After a trial, Findlay found a former Senior Operations Supervisor at the Production Operations Division of the Seria Crude Oil Terminal, guilty of taking bribes from Musfada Enterprise.

== Personal life ==
Findlay married South African-born Dawn Borchers in 1966. Dawn died on 6 September 2019, in Cape Town, while Findlay died a few months later.

== Honours ==
Findlay has earned the following honours;

=== National ===
- Officer of the Order of the British Empire (OBE; 1991)

=== Foreign ===
- Hong Kong:
  - Gold Bauhinia Star (GBS; 2001)
- Brunei:
  - Order of Paduka Seri Laila Jasa Second Class (DSLJ; 15 July 2018) – Dato Seri Laila Jasa
