= Hong Kong Reunification Ordinance =

Legislation of Hong Kong

Provisional Legislative Council
- Long title: An Ordinance to confirm the Bills passed by the Provisional Legislative Council before 1 July 1997, endorse the appointment of judges of the Court of Final Appeal and the Chief Judge of the High Court, assist the interpretation on and after 1 July 1997 of laws previously in force in Hong Kong, continue those laws and confirm certain other laws, establish the High Court, the District Court, magistracies and other courts, tribunals and boards, continue legal proceedings, the criminal justice system, the administration of justice and the course of public justice on and after 1 July 1997, continue the public service on and after 1 July 1997, assist the construction of certain documents on and after 1 July 1997, transfer the ownership of certain property and rights and provide for the assumption of certain liabilities on and after 1 July 1997, in consequence of the resumption of the exercise of sovereignty over Hong Kong by the People’s Republic of China, and for connected purposes.
- Citation: Ordinance No. 110 of 1997
- Enacted by: Provisional Legislative Council
- Enacted: 1 July 1997
- Signed by: Tung Chee-hwa, Chief Executive
- Signed: 1 July 1997
- Effective: 1 July 1997

Legislative history
- Introduced by: Elsie Leung, Secretary for Justice
- Introduced: 1 July 1997
- First reading: 1 July 1997
- Second reading: 1 July 1997
- Third reading: 1 July 1997
- Status: Current legislation

Hong Kong Reunification Ordinance, in short Reunification Ordinance, is a legislation of Hong Kong passed by the Provisional Legislative Council on 1 July 1997, the day of handover, to provide for the continuation of the administration of justice and the public service and to provide for associated matters to ensure the continuity of the social order of Hong Kong.

== Articles ==
The Ordinance contains 32 sections and 2 schedules, categorised in 9 parts:

1. General
2. Bills Passed by the Provisional Legislative Council Confirmed
3. Judges of Court of Final Appeal and Chief Judge of High Court
4. Interpretation of Laws Previously in Force
5. Establishment of Courts, etc.
6. Legal Proceedings, Criminal Justice System and Administration of Justice
7. Continuity of Public Service
8. Documents
9. Government Property.

== Background ==
Chris Patten, last Governor of Hong Kong, implemented the democratization of the Hong Kong parliament in early 1990s, which angered the Chinese Government and abandoned the "through-train" plan. The decision means members of the Hong Kong colonial Legislative Council cannot continue to sit as members of the Legislative Council of the Hong Kong Special Administrative Region (SAR). On 24 March 1996, the Provisional Legislative Council (PLC) was established under the decisions by Beijing. The PLC, responsible for passing "essential" laws for the SAR and ratifying legislations after the handover, convened its first meeting on 25 January 1997 in Shenzhen.

At midnight on 1 July 1997, the sovereignty of Hong Kong was transferred to China by the United Kingdom.

== Proceedings ==
At 02:45 on 1 July, members of the PLC entered Hall 201 at the Hong Kong Convention and Exhibition Centre, convening the first meeting in Hong Kong and after the handover. After the address by Rita Fan, the President of PLC, the Hong Kong Reunification Bill was read for the first time. Elsie Leung, Secretary for Justice, then moved that the Bill be read a second time. All pro-Beijing legislators supported the bill, while Frederick Fung, chairman of the pan-democracy party ADPL and speaking on behalf of the only 4 democrats in the chamber, objected the amendments to Public Order Ordinance, Societies Ordinance, Urban Council Ordinance, Regional Council Ordinance, and District Councils Ordinance, but agreed on the other sections of the Bill. The Bill was then read for the second time without objection, and entered the Committee stage. All sections were then passed, including the five amendment bills objected by the pan-democracy MPs. The Bill finally read for the third time, also without objection, and henceforth became the first bill of the SAR enacted. The PLC adjourned the meeting at 03:55 after the Bill was passed.

Tung Chee-hwa, the Chief Executive of Hong Kong, gave his signature to the Bill, the first after assuming office. Hong Kong Reunification Ordinance was gazetted on the same day.

== Reaction ==
The Reunification Ordinance was regarded as the most fundamental local legislation for the Hong Kong SAR as it settles the handover. In 2018, Wang Zhimin, the then-Director of the Liaison Office of the Central People's Government in Hong Kong, described the Ordinance as the first gift of reassurance by the Chinese Government as the SAR was established.

In the same month after the handover, the legality of the Hong Kong Reunification Ordinance and the PLC was challenged, arguing that the PLC was not formed in accordance with the Basic Law and is hence an illegal organ, and that all laws passed by the PLC shall be null and void. The case was rejected by the High Court as it ruled the PLC is legal and that all legislations, including the Reunification Ordinance, were enacted validly.

Labelled as "restoring evil laws", Part 2 of the Reunification Ordinance was the most controversial as it confirms the bills passed by the PLC before handover, which includes legislations criticised to have infringed human rights, such as amending the Public Order Ordinances to the version before the Hong Kong Bill of Rights Ordinance was enacted, limiting the freedom of assembly.

Furthermore, the Reunification Ordinance transfers executive, legislative, and judiciary powers of the Crown, British Government and British Forces Overseas Hong Kong to the Chinese Government and People's Liberation Army Hong Kong Garrison respectively, and the law stipulated that "[any] provision saving the rights of Her Majesty, Her Heirs and Successors shall be construed as saving the rights of the Central People’s Government of the People’s Republic of China and the rights of the Government of the Hong Kong Special Administrative Region under the Basic Law or other laws.", and was questioned for the implication that governmental agencies of China can enjoy royal prerogatives of the British royal.
