= Legal Department (Hong Kong) =

Former Hong Kong government department

- 律政署

Agency overview
- Formed: 1950
- Preceding agencies: Attorney General's Department; Crown Solicitor's Department
- Dissolved: 30 June 1997
- Superseding agency: Department of Justice
- Jurisdiction: Hong Kong
- Headquarters: Central and Western District
- Minister responsible: Jeremy Fell Mathews (Final), Attorney General; (etc.)

Legal Department
- Chinese: 律政署
Transcriptions
Yue: Cantonese
- Yale Romanization: Leuht jing chyúh
- Jyutping: Leot^{6} zing^{3} cyu^{5}

Attorney General's Chambers
- Chinese: 律政司署
Transcriptions
Standard Mandarin
- Hanyu Pinyin: Lǜ zhèngsī shǔ
Yue: Cantonese
- Jyutping: leot6zing3 si1 cyu5

The Legal Department, also known as the Attorney General's Chambers, was the department responsible for advising the government on legal matters, drafting legislation and conducting public prosecutions in Hong Kong until 1997, when Hong Kong ceased to be a British crown colony. It was led by the Attorney General, who was the third-most senior civil servant in colonial Hong Kong, after the Chief Secretary and Financial Secretary.

The department was created in 1950 as the product of a merger between the Attorney General's Department and the Crown Solicitor's Department. The name of the department was changed to the Department of Justice upon the transfer of sovereignty in 1997, with the head of the department renamed the Secretary for Justice.

== History ==
=== Attorney General's Department (1844-1950) ===
The first Attorney General of Hong Kong, Paul Ivy Sterling, was appointed in 1844.

=== Crown Solicitor's Department (1912-1950) ===
The position of Crown Solicitor was established in 1856, and had the job of being the government's solicitor in proceedings before the courts, with the power to conduct prosecutions at the Criminal Sessions or before the Full Court.

=== Legal Department (1950-1997) ===
The Legal Department was created in 1950 with the enactment of the Legal Officers Ordinance 1950, which merged the Attorney General's Department and the Crown Solicitor's Department. The ordinance also had the effect of giving "legal officers", which now included the Attorney General, the Solicitor General, the Crown Solicitor, Crown Counsel, the Legal Draftsman and their deputies, the right to practice as both barristers and solicitors while they were in office. The ordinance also codified the unwritten convention that the Solicitor General, as the Attorney General's chief deputy, would enjoy the same rights accorded to the Attorney General.

In 1968, the Legal Department was organised into five Divisions, all of which still remain today. In 1983, the Department consisted of 154 Crown counsel, an increase of 50% compared to 1978. The department, which had been housed in the Central Government Offices and United Centre, moved into the first to seventh floors of the Queensway Government Offices in January 1986.

The Attorney General of Hong Kong had powers equivalent to the Attorney General of England and Wales.

== Organisation ==
As of 1996, the year before the Handover, the Attorney General's Office consisted of six divisions. These included five professional divisions headed by Law Officers, to whom the Attorney General delegated part of his powers and responsibilities. These divisions remain largely unchanged in the modern Department of Justice.

=== Legal Policy Division ===
Headed by the Solicitor General, the Legal Policy Division provided for the professional needs of the Attorney General, promoted legislation, and gave legal input on policy issues relating to the administration of justice, human rights, constitutional law and China law. This division is now known as the Constitutional and Policy Affairs Division.

=== Civil Division ===
Led by the Crown Solicitor, the Civil Division provided legal advice on civil law to all Government bureaux and departments and represented the Government both as solicitors and as barristers in all civil litigation, including arbitration.

=== Prosecutions Division ===
Led by the Crown Prosecutor, crown counsel in this division conducted the majority of prosecutions in High Court and District Court trials.

=== Law Drafting Division ===
Law Drafting Division, led by the Law Draftsman, serviced the needs of the Solicitor General, and gave legal policy advice in respect of matters currently being considered by the Government

=== International Law Division ===
International Law Division – was headed by the Law Officer (International Law) and provided advice on public international law to the Government and negotiates, or provided legal advisers on negotiations, for bilateral agreements

=== Administration Division ===
The Administration Division was led by the Chambers Manager, who also served as the department's controlling officer with financial and administrative responsibilities for the entire Legal Department. The division's responsibilities included administration, finances and accounting, management services and office automation, training, library, general translation services, recruitment, personnel and office accommodation.
