= Law Officer (Civil Law) =

Head of the Civil Division of the Hong Kong Department of Justice

- 民事法律專員
- Incumbent; Christina Cheung since 26 February 2015
- Department of Justice
- Status: Law Officer
- Reports to: Secretary for Justice
- Appointer: Chief Executive
- Precursor: Crown Solicitor
- Formation: 1856 (as Crown Solicitor)
- Salary: HKD 287,990 (monthly)

In Hong Kong, the Law Officer (Civil Law) (Chinese: 民事法律專員) is the head of the Civil Division of the Hong Kong Department of Justice.

The Law Officer (Civil Law) is responsible for advising the government on civil law matters and representing the government in civil litigation. It is one of six Law Officers in the government directly reporting to the Secretary for Justice. The office was known as the Crown Solicitor (Chinese: 民事檢察專員) before the 1997 handover of Hong Kong.

The current Law Officer (Civil Law) is Christina Cheung, who was appointed in 2015 and is the first woman to serve in the position.

== History ==
=== Colonial era ===
==== As head of an independent department (1856-1950) ====
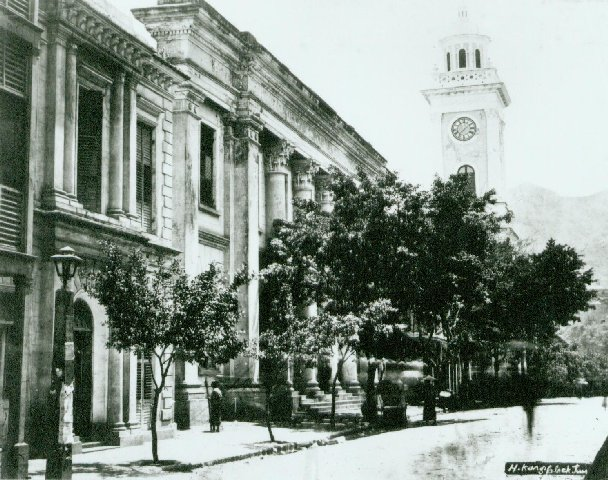
The first-generation Supreme Court building, where the Crown Solicitor's office was located before 1912.

The position of Crown Solicitor was created in 1856, during the early decades of the colony's existence. Its holder was paid a salary of £150 per annum in 1859, an amount that was doubled to £300 in 1860 (equivalent to £32,658 in 2025) by the enactment of the Civil List Ordinance by the Legislative Council. By 1911, the Crown Solicitor's salary had risen to £900 per year, equivalent to about £92,202 in 2025. The rise had come in part due to the Secretary of State's decision in 1910 to make the Crown Solicitor a full-time role, as opposed to appointing lawyers who would simultaneously continue in private practice, as had been done since 1856. A fixed annual salary of £1350 was introduced in 1937.

The Crown Solicitor's Office was separate from the Attorney General's Chambers; the two departments would not be brought together until 1950, when the Legal Officers Ordinance was enacted. Assistant Crown Solicitors from the Crown Solicitor's office would often be seconded to the Treasury, Supreme Court Registry and the Registrar General's Department. Contemporary references to the Crown Solicitor's department during Legislative Council debates suggest that the department was routinely understaffed, with some cases briefed out to outside counsel in order to lighten the load.

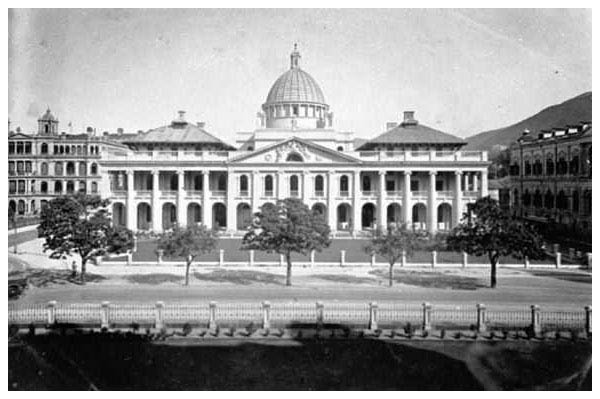
The old Supreme Court Building housed the department from 1912 to 1957.

The Crown Solicitor's powers were later codified in 1912 by the Crown Solicitors Ordinance, with the holder of the office responsible for being the government's solicitor in proceedings before the courts, with the power to conduct prosecutions at the Criminal Sessions or before the Full Court. The Ordinance also enabled the Crown Solicitor to give advice to the naval and military authorities with the consent of the governor. Despite the title, both barristers and solicitors were eligible to be appointed as Crown Solicitor or as his deputy, though most holders of the office have been solicitors. Upon the opening of the Supreme Court Building in 1912, the Crown Solicitor's offices were relocated to the premises from its previous location in the old courthouse in Central, sharing the second floor with the Attorney General's Department. The Crown Solicitor's office was recorded as having 7 people in its employ in 1925, with $50,322 set down for the department's personal emoluments in the 1931 Estimates.

==== As head of the Civil Division of the Legal Department (1950-1997) ====
Until the creation of the Legal Department in 1950, which merged the offices of the Attorney General, Crown Solicitor, and Legal Draftsman, there was no centralised legal department that oversaw all of the government's legal matters. The legal affairs of the colony were discharged by lawyers who were attached to, among others, the Attorney General's Department, the Crown Solicitor's Department, and the Registrar General's Department. The Crown Solicitor became one of several law officers under the Attorney General in the new Legal Department, alongside the Solicitor General, Director of Public Prosecutions and Law Draftsman.

=== After the Handover (1997-present) ===
The position was retitled Law Officer (Civil Law) upon the transfer of sovereignty from the United Kingdom to the People's Republic of China on 1 July 1997.

== Role ==
The Law Officer (Civil Law), who is graded at point 6 on the Directorate (Legal) Pay Scale, is supported by six Deputy Law Officers (Civil Law), graded as principal government counsel. The Law Officer often appears before the Legislative Council to explain the government's position on civil law matters and to take questions from legislators on bills, and is an ex-officio member of a number of civil law-related government panels and statutory bodies, such as the Working Party on Civil Justice Reform, subcommittees of the Law Reform Commission, Steering Committee on Mediation, and the Process Review Panel for the Securities and Futures Commission.

== The Civil Division ==
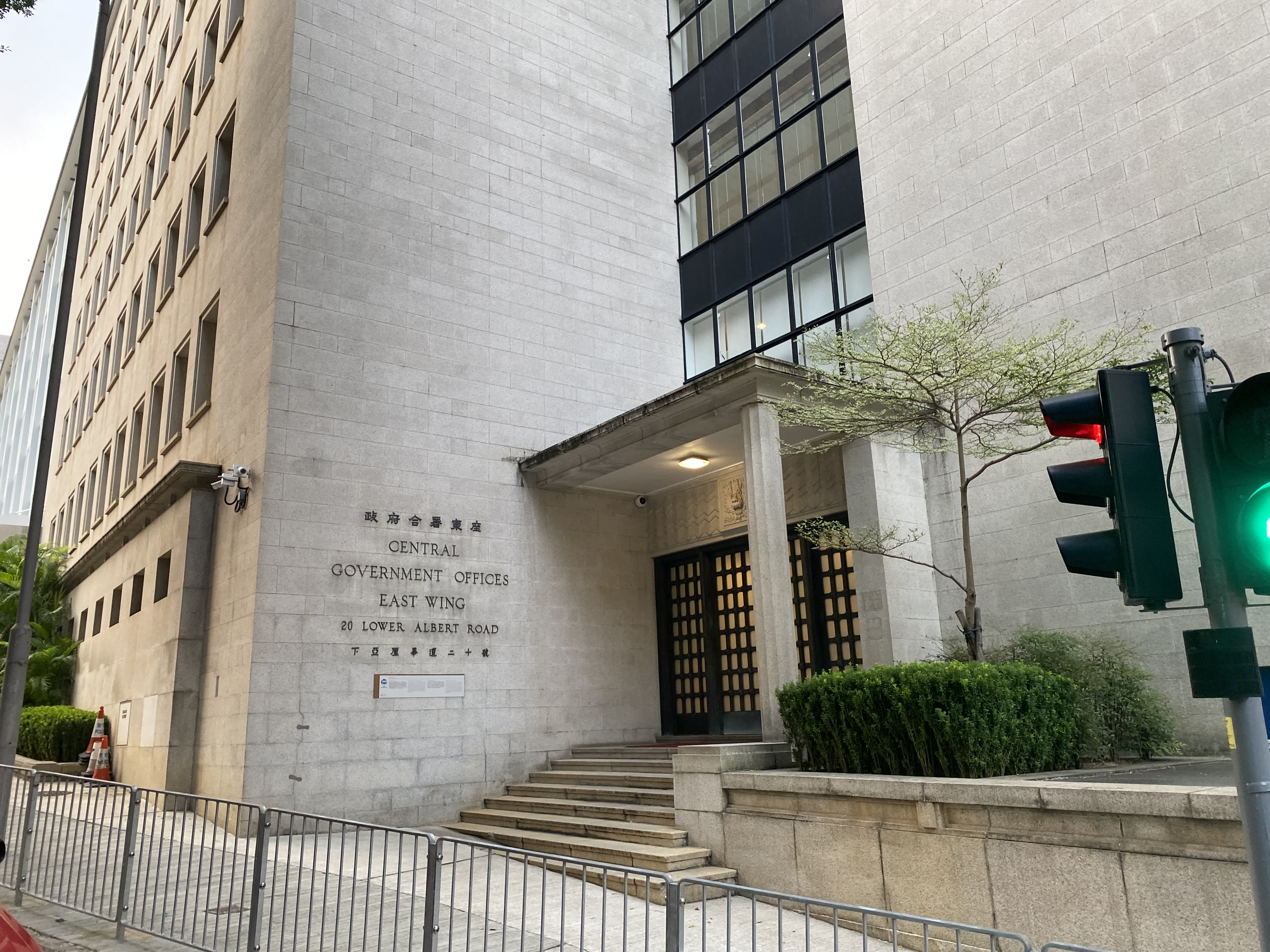
The East Wing of Justice Place

The Civil Division is composed of four units, including the Civil Litigation Unit, Civil Advisory Unit, Commercial Unit, and Planning, Environment, Lands & Housing Unit. The Civil Division also oversees the Legal Advisory Division (Works) of the Works Branch of the Development Bureau. While the Civil Litigation Unit, which is the largest of the four, is most prominently responsible for representing the government in judicial review cases, the Civil Division is also in charge of drafting and tendering contracts for major infrastructure projects, such as the Hong Kong-Zhuhai-Macao Bridge and the Central-Wan Chai Bypass. The following is a list of units in the Civil Division:

- Civil Litigation Unit
  - Unit 1
    - Team 1 (Personal injury, professional disciplinary proceedings)
    - Team 3 (Commercial litigation)
    - Team 5 (Miscellaneous claims and costs team)
  - Unit 2
    - Team 2 (Public law & immigration)
    - Team 4 (Convention Against Torture and other immigration-related cases)
- Civil Advisory Unit
  - Advisory I
  - Advisory II
  - Advisory III
- Commercial Unit
  - Commercial I
  - Commercial II
  - Commercial III
- Planning, Environment, Lands & Housing Unit
  - Mediation Team
  - Litigation Team
  - Advisory Team

Each unit is headed by a deputy law officer at the rank of principal government counsel, except for the Civil Litigation Unit, which is headed by two deputy law officers. The head of the Legal Advisory Division (Works), titled the Legal Advisor (Works), is also graded as a principal government counsel. As of 1 October 2018, 183 government lawyers worked at the Civil Division, with a total establishment of 380.

The offices of the Civil Division are split between the second and sixth floors of the Main and East wings of Justice Place in Central.

== List of Crown Solicitors and Law Officers (Civil Law) ==
No.	Officeholder	Term start	Term end	Remarks
1	James John Hickson	1 December 1856	6 February 1857	Also Deputy Sheriff, Coroner, and Queen's Proctor
2	George Cooper Turner	6 February 1857	2 February 1861	Previously Civil Crown Solicitor in Sydney; died 1861
3	Francis Innes Hazeland	8 February 1861	21 January 1871	Died in office; was in office for roughly 10 years
4	Edmund Sharp	25 January 1871	4 May 1883	Acting until 18 May 1871; on leave in 1872, 1875, 1877
5	Alfred Bulmer Johnson	29 December 1883	30 November 1896	Acting crown solicitor in 1877, 1880 and from 5 May 1883
6	Henry Lardner Dennys	1 December 1896	31 December 1899	On leave in 1899
7	Francis Bulmer Lyon Bowley	1 January 1900	31 October 1911	Acting until 3 June 1899
8	Joseph Horsford Kemp	1 September 1911	1914	Barrister; later became Chief Justice
9	Paul Mary Hodgson	28 March 1914	1916	
10	George Herbert Wakeman	17 May 1916	1922	
11	Harold Kennard Holmes	10 July 1922	1935	
12	Thomas Maynard Hazlerigg	30 April 1935	1937	
13	Evan Walter Davies	4 August 1937	18 September 1945	Interned by the Japanese during World War II
	Ernest Hillas Williams			Interned by the Japanese during World War II
	Lancelot Andrewes			
	Garth Cecil Thornton	10 June 1970	1973	Queen's Counsel
	F.T.M. Jones		April 1982	
	Jeremy Fell Mathews	April or May 1982	April 1988	Later became Attorney General
	Peter Allan	1988	1991	
	Ian Wingfield	1991	18 November 2002	First Law Officer (Civil Law) after the Handover in 1997
	Benedict Lai Ying-sie	18 November 2004	25 February 2015	
	Christina Cheung Kam-wai	26 February 2015	Incumbent	First woman to hold the office

== See also ==
- Department of Justice (Hong Kong)
  - Solicitor General of Hong Kong
  - Director of Public Prosecutions (Hong Kong)
  - Law Draftsman
- Legal Department (Hong Kong)
- Treasury Solicitor
