= Law officer =

Law officer may refer to:

- Law officers of the Crown, the chief legal advisers to the British monarch and his government
- Law officer (Hong Kong), senior legal advisers to the Government of Hong Kong

== See also ==
- Officer of the court, persons having a role in the legal system
- Officer of the United States, a classification of functionaries in the U.S federal government
- Police officer, a type of law enforcement officer
