= Sirr =

Sirr may refer to:

== People ==
People with the surname Sirr, including:

- Henry Charles Sirr (1807–1872), British lawyer, diplomat and writer
- Henry Charles Sirr (soldier) (1764–1841), Irish soldier, police officer, wine merchant and collector of documents and curios
- Peter Sirr (born 1960), Irish poet

People with the given name Sirr, including:

- Sirr Al-Khatim Al-Khalifa (1919–2006), Sudanese politician and ambassador
- Sirr Parker (born 1977), former college and professional football running back

== Other ==
- Sirr, one of the six Lataif-e-sitta or psychospiritual "organs" in Sufi psychology

== Acronyms ==
SIRR may mean:

- Seremban Inner Ring Road, Malaysia
- Southern Illinois River-to-River Conference, a high school athletic conference
