= Law officer (Hong Kong) =

Chief legal advisers to the Hong Kong government

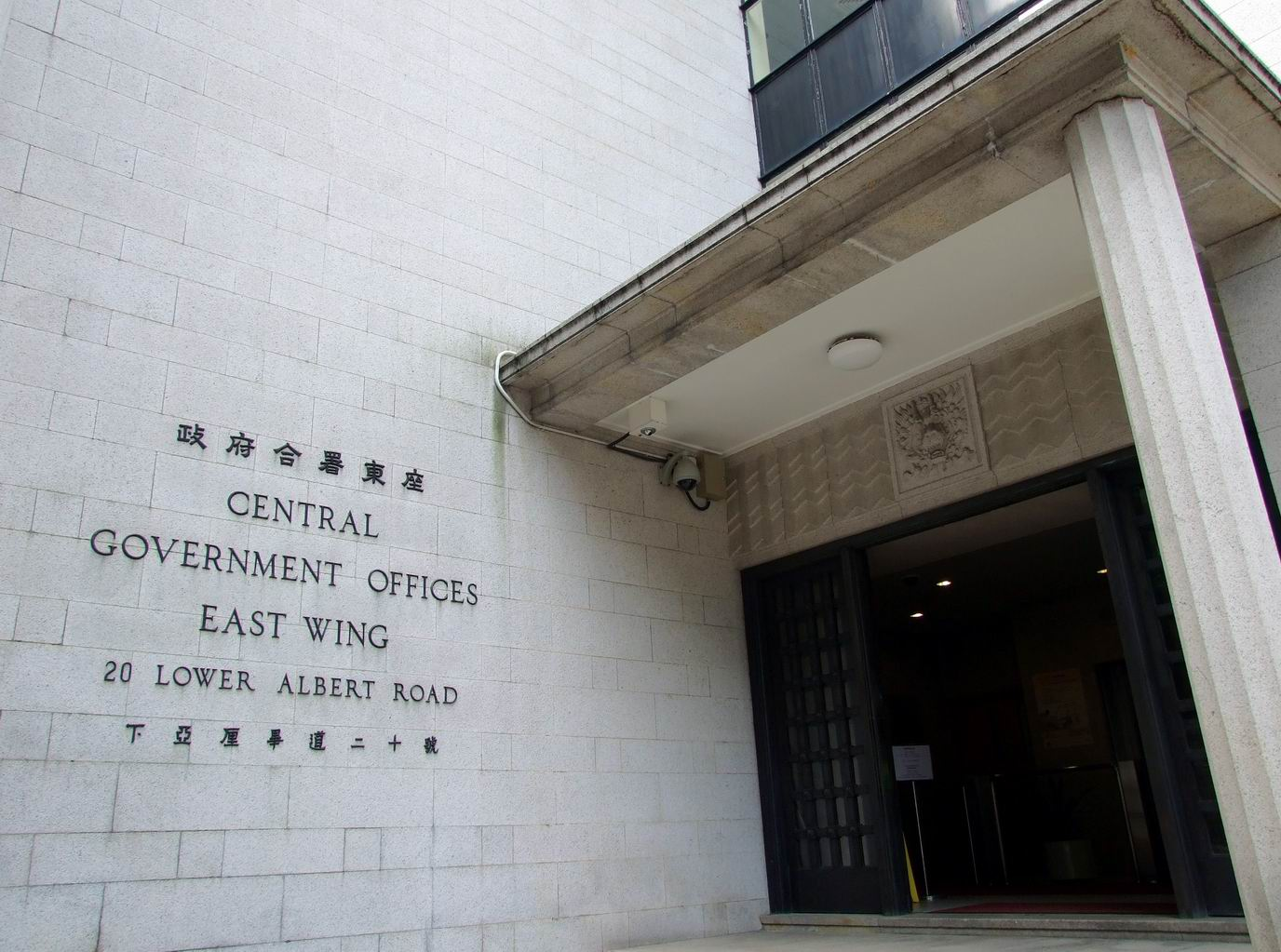
Justice Place, where the offices of the Department of Justice are located

Law officers (Chinese: 律政專員) in the Hong Kong Department of Justice are senior government lawyers who each head one of the department's six divisions. They are the most senior civil servants in the department and report directly to the secretary for justice, who is a political appointee.

== History ==
The rank of law officer was created in 1979 as a new civil service rank below the Attorney General and above principal crown counsel. At the time of the rank's inception, the law officers were the Crown Solicitor, Director of Public Prosecutions and Law Draftsman; the holders of these posts were previously graded as principal crown counsel. A Law Officer (International Law) was added in 1989.

Following the imposition of the National Security Law in 2020, a Law Officer (National Security) was added to head the National Security Prosecutions Division, formally separate from the Director of Public Prosecutions, who stated in his resignation letter that he had been excluded from handling national security cases. Very little information is publicly available about the role; the government has declined to release information about the division's budget or the identity of its head.

== Role ==
Each law officer heads a division within the Department of Justice. Before the first deputy secretary of justice was appointed in 2022, the law officers would deputise for the secretary for justice when he or she was away from Hong Kong.

Law officers are graded at point 6 (the highest point) on the Directorate (Legal) Pay Scale, equivalent to the head of a government department, and are paid a salary of 287,990 HKD per month. While most law officers are selected through internal promotion, law officers are sometimes appointed from outside the department, with the three law draftsmen who served successively from 2008 to 2020 all being recruited from the office of parliamentary counsel in Australia.

Unlike their counterparts in the UK, law officers in Hong Kong are not political appointees, and report to a minister instead of directly to the head of government.

== List of law officers ==
=== Current ===
Law Officer	Division	Date created	Incumbent	Remarks
Solicitor General	Constitutional and Policy Affairs	1947	Llewellyn Mui	Abolished 1979; recreated 1981
Law Officer (Civil Law)	Civil	1 December 1856	Christina Cheung	Titled Crown Solicitor before 1 July 1997
Law Draftsman	Law Drafting	20 February 1964	Michael Lam	
Director of Public Prosecutions	Prosecutions	22 December 1966	Anthony Chau	Titled Crown Prosecutor between 1979 and 1997
Law Officer (International Law)	International Law	January 1989	James Ding	Created in May 1985 as Special Duties Unit
Law Officer (National Security)	National Security Prosecutions	2020 or 2021	Unknown	
Secretary to the Law Reform Commission	-	1980	Wesley Wong	Upgraded to law officer in 2021; does not head a division

=== Defunct ===
Law Officer	Date created	Date abolished	Officeholder	Remarks
Law Officer (Special Duties)	April 2021	~2022	Llewellyn Mui	Created to implement 2021 electoral changes

== See also ==
- Law officers of the Crown
