= Bertrand de Speville =

Hong Kong government official (1941–2020)

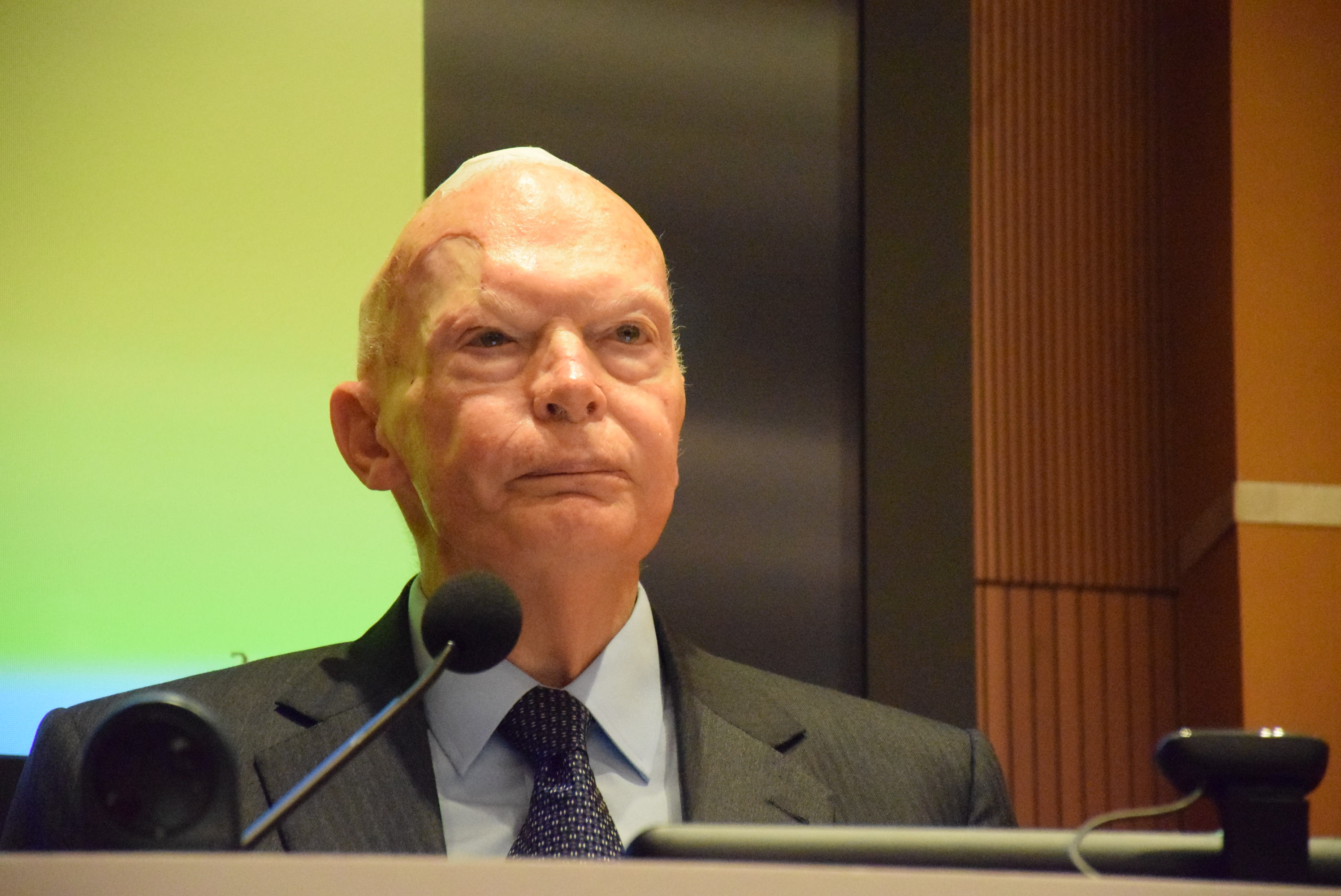
- de Speville in 2016

Commissioner of the ICAC
- In office 22 February 1993 – 21 January 1996
- Governor: Chris Patten
- Preceded by: Peter Allan
- Succeeded by: Michael Leung

Solicitor General of Hong Kong
- In office 1991–1993
- Preceded by: Frank Stock
- Succeeded by: Daniel Fung

Personal details
- Born: 16 June 1941 Durban, South Africa
- Died: 29 March 2020 (aged 78) London, England
- Spouse: Carol de Speville
- Education: University College London
- Profession: Lawyer

Bertrand de Speville
- Traditional Chinese: 施百偉
Transcriptions
Yue: Cantonese
- Jyutping: si1 baak3 wai5

Bertrand Edouard Doger de Speville (Chinese: 施百偉, 16 June 1941 – 29 March 2020) was a Hong Kong government official who served as solicitor general and as the commissioner of the Independent Commission Against Corruption (ICAC).

== Biography ==
Born in Durban, South Africa, de Speville was raised in Salisbury (now called Harare), Southern Rhodesia. He moved to England in 1960 to study law at University College London, and was called to the bar in 1964. He spent 10 years as a barrister in private practice followed by three years in the United Kingdom legal service. At the urging of then-Attorney General John Calvert Griffiths, de Speville moved to Hong Kong and joined the civil service in January 1981 as a deputy principal crown counsel. In October 1985 he was promoted to principal crown counsel.

On 10 July 1992, de Speville formally took up the post of solicitor general, succeeding Frank Stock. He had actually served in this role on an acting basis since 1991. He subsequently served as commissioner of the Independent Commission Against Corruption from 22 February 1993 until 21 January 1996.

After stepping down, de Speville returned to England and established de Speville and Associates, an anti-corruption consultancy, and advised various countries and agencies on strategies for combatting corruption. He was elected as a bencher in 2007. He died at home in Kew on 29 March 2020.

== Books ==
- de Speville, Bertrand (1997). Hong Kong: Policy Initiatives Against Corruption. Paris: Organisation for Economic Co-operation and Development. ISBN 9264160108.
- de Speville, Bertrand (2010). Overcoming Corruption: The Essentials. de Speville & Associates. ISBN 0956478808.
