= Clare-Marie Beeson =

New Zealand-born lawyer

The Honourable Madam Justice Claire-Marie Beeson SBS

Judge of the Court of First Instance of the High Court
- In office 1 December 1997 – September 2013

Chief District Judge
- In office 7 January 1997 – 30 November 1997

Personal details
- Born: 1948 (age 77–78) New Zealand
- Spouse: Ian Wingfield

Clare-Marie Beeson
- Traditional Chinese: 貝珊
- Simplified Chinese: 贝珊
Transcriptions
Standard Mandarin
- Hanyu Pinyin: Bèi Shān
Yue: Cantonese
- Jyutping: bui3 saan1

Clare-Marie Beeson, SBS (Chinese: 貝珊) is a New Zealand-born lawyer who served as a judge in the Hong Kong Judiciary for over 29 years.

== Early life and career ==
Beeson was born in 1948 in New Zealand. She was admitted as a solicitor and barrister in New Zealand in 1972 and was in private practice.

In 1975, she joined the Hong Kong Legal Department as Crown Counsel and was promoted to Senior Crown Counsel in 1980.

== Judicial career ==
Beeson joined the Hong Kong Judiciary as a magistrate in 1984 and became principal magistrate in 1990. She was appointed a District Court judge in 1991. On 7 January 1997, Beeson was appointed Chief District Judge, a position she had held in an acting capacity since 1995. Her appointment was described by the South China Morning Post as "controversial", citing previous allegations that she had tried to interfere with another judge's trial. An internal Judiciary inquiry later cleared her of wrongdoing in September 1996.

On 1 December 1997, Beeson moved from her position as Chief District Judge to the Court of First Instance of the High Court of Hong Kong.

In 2013, Beeson retired from the bench. She was awarded the Silver Bauhinia Star for her service in the Hong Kong Judiciary, particularly for her work presiding over serious criminal cases in the High Court.

Between 2014 and 2016, Beeson sat as a Deputy Judge of the High Court of Hong Kong.

== Personal life ==
Beeson is married to Ian Wingfield, former Solicitor-General of Hong Kong. They have two daughters, Clarissa and Clementine Beeson.
