= Ian Wingfield =

Ian Wingfield GBS

Solicitor General of Hong Kong
- In office 25 January 2007 – 2 August 2010
- Preceded by: Robert Charles Allcock
- Succeeded by: Frank Poon Ying-kwong

Crown Solicitor (1991-1997) Law Officer (Civil Law) (1997-2002)
- In office 1991 – October 2002

Personal details
- Born: London, England
- Education: University of East Anglia
- Profession: Barrister

Ian George McCurdy Wingfield GBS served as Solicitor General of Hong Kong from 2007 to 2010.

== Early life ==
Wingfield was born in London and graduated from the University of East Anglia in 1970.

== Career ==
Wingfield was called to the English Bar at Inner Temple in 1974 and to the Hong Kong Bar in 1994.

He joined the Hong Kong Government as Government Counsel in January 1982. He was promoted to Senior Government Counsel in October 1982, to Deputy Principal Government Counsel in March 1985, and to Principal Government Counsel in March 1988. He was further promoted to Law Officer in November 1991 and since then held the positions of Law Officer (Civil Law), Law Officer (International Law). He was appointed Solicitor General of Hong Kong in 2007.

In 2010, he left the Department of Justice and resumed practice as a barrister at the private bar in Hong Kong.

== Awards ==
Wingfield was awarded the Gold Bauhinia Star in 1999 for his public service in the Department of Justice.

== Marriage ==
Wingfield is married to Clare-Marie Beeson, a former Judge of the Court of First Instance of the High Court of Hong Kong.
