= Rimsky Yuen =

Hong Kong barrister

The Honourable Rimsky Yuen GBM SC JP
- 袁國強
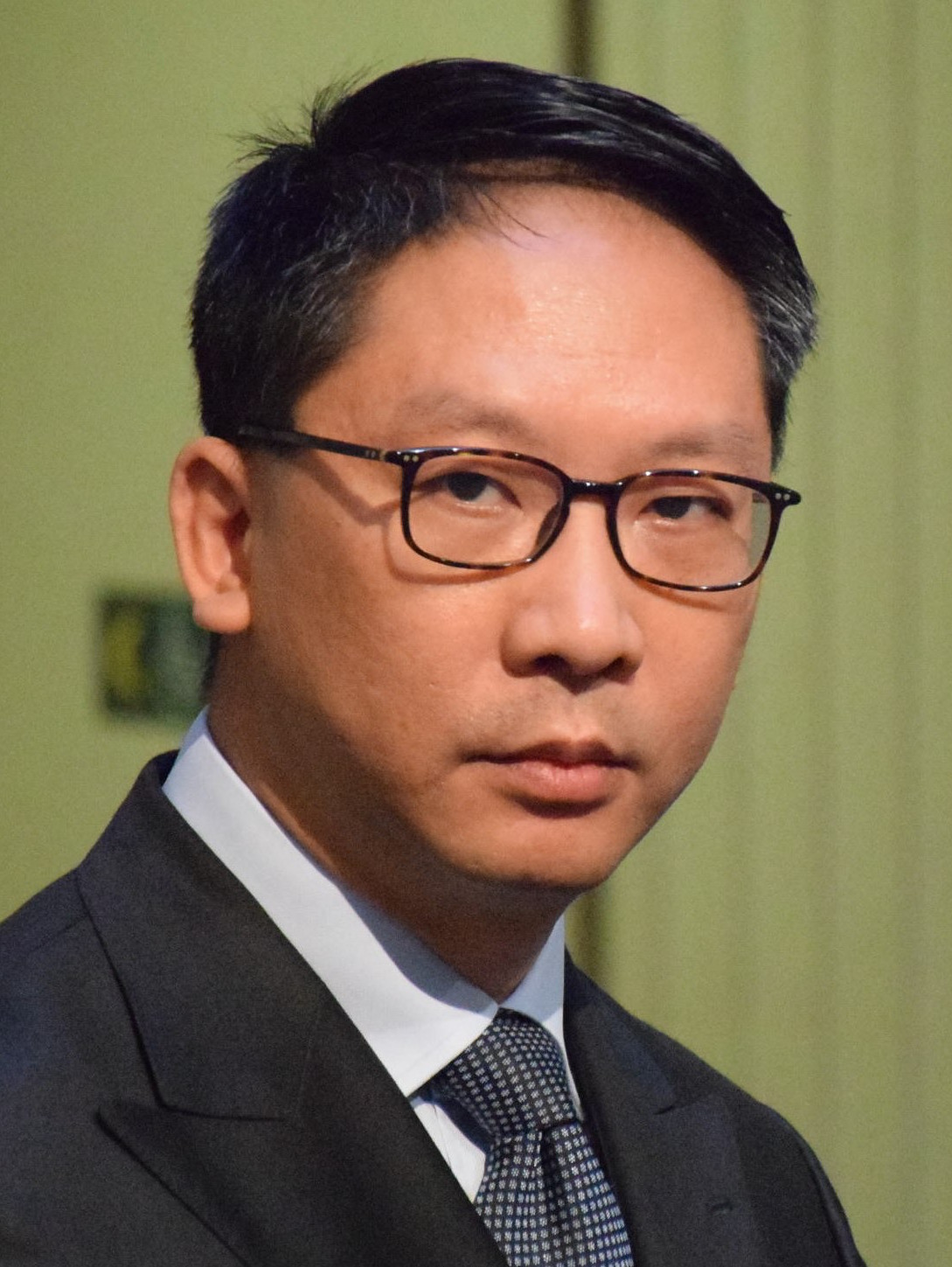

3rd Secretary for Justice of Hong Kong
- In office 1 July 2012 – 6 January 2018
- Preceded by: Wong Yan-lung
- Succeeded by: Teresa Cheng

Member of the Guangdong committee of the Chinese People's Political Consultative Conference
- In office March 2008 – March 2012

Chairman of the Hong Kong Bar Association
- In office January 2007 – January 2009
- Preceded by: Philip Dykes
- Succeeded by: Russell Coleman

Personal details
- Born: 17 June 1964 (age 62) Hong Kong
- Education: University of Hong Kong; City University of Hong Kong

Rimsky Yuen
- Traditional Chinese: 袁國強
- Simplified Chinese: 袁国强
Transcriptions
Standard Mandarin
- Hanyu Pinyin: Yuán Guóqiáng
Yue: Cantonese
- Yale Romanization: Yùhn Gwok-kèuhng
- Jyutping: Jyun^{4} Gwok^{3}-koeng^{4}

Rimsky Yuen Kwok-keung GBM SC JP (Chinese: 袁國強; born 17 June 1964) is a Hong Kong barrister who served as the third Secretary for Justice of Hong Kong from 2012 to 2018.

Yuen was the chairman of the Hong Kong Bar Association from 2007 to 2010, as well as a member of the Guangdong Committee of the Chinese People's Political Consultative Conference, prior to his appointment as Secretary for Justice. His time in office coincided with various political controversies in which he played a central role. They include: the 2014–15 electoral reform which triggered the Occupy Central movement, the Legislative Council oath-taking saga which resulted in the disqualifications of six legislators, the 2017 imprisonment of Hong Kong democracy activists, and the Guangzhou–Shenzhen–Hong Kong Express Rail Link project which was the subject of a judicial review challenge. He currently practices from Temple Chambers in Hong Kong. He is registered as a barrister in Hong Kong and as an Advocate and Solicitor in Singapore.

Yuen was awarded the Grand Bauhinia Medal (GBM) by the Hong Kong Government in 2017.

== Education and early career ==
Yuen was born into a grassroots family in 1964. He lived in Lower Wong Tai Sin Estate during his early life. He was educated at Queen Elizabeth School and the University of Hong Kong. He was called to Bar in 1987 after serving pupillage under Mohan Tarachand Bharwaney and Lawrence Lok QC.

In 1995, Yuen joined Temple Chambers, one of the largest barristers' chambers in Hong Kong, on the invitation of former Attorney General Michael Thomas QC and Ronny Tong QC. He specialised in civil litigation, especially commercial disputes including advisory and court works relating to contract disputes, shareholders and partners disputes, corporate and personal insolvency, trusts, banking and financial products disputes, international trade and arbitration. Yuen was also called to the Singapore bar in the same year. In 1997, he earned an LLM at the City University of Hong Kong, studying Chinese laws under Wang Guiguo and Priscilla Leung.

In 2003 he was appointed Senior Counsel after 15 years of practice. After taking silk, his practice expanded to include regulatory matters and judicial reviews. He also served as an arbitrator in international arbitrations and a mediator in commercial disputes.

In 2006 Yuen was appointed a Recorder of the Court of First Instance of the High Court, in which capacity he handled various civil litigations. He also became increasingly involved in public service: he served as a member of the Judicial Officers Recommendation Commission, non-official member of the Independent Commission Against Corruption Advisory Committee on Corruption, the chairman of the Transport Advisory Committee, and a non-executive director of Mandatory Provident Fund Schemes Authority and council member of the Hong Kong Institute of Education.

== Bar association chairman ==
In 2007, Rimsky Yuen was elected chairman of the Hong Kong Bar Association. When he was re-elected in 2008, it was revealed that he was a member of the Chinese People's Political Consultative Conference Guangdong Committee. Democratic Party chairman Albert Ho and Civic Party member Audrey Eu, called for Yuen to step down. Ronny Tong, who had declined a similar offer of appointment to the Guangdong CPPCC during his tenure as Bar Association chairman, also expressed his disappointment in Yuen and expressed his concerns over potential conflicts of interest.

In contrast, legislator Kwong Chi-kin of the Hong Kong Federation of Trade Unions supported Yuen's appointment, stating that it would promote cooperation with mainland authorities; an editorial of Wen Wei Po also argued that no conflict of interest arose by Yuen's appointment. On 17 January 2008, he was re-elected as the chairman unopposed for another year-term.

== Secretary for Justice ==
In June 2012, Yuen was nominated by the Chief Executive-elect Leung Chun-ying to be appointed as Secretary for Justice.

On 25 September 2015, Yuen was elected as an Honorary Bencher of the Middle Temple.

=== 2014 electoral reform and Occupy protests ===
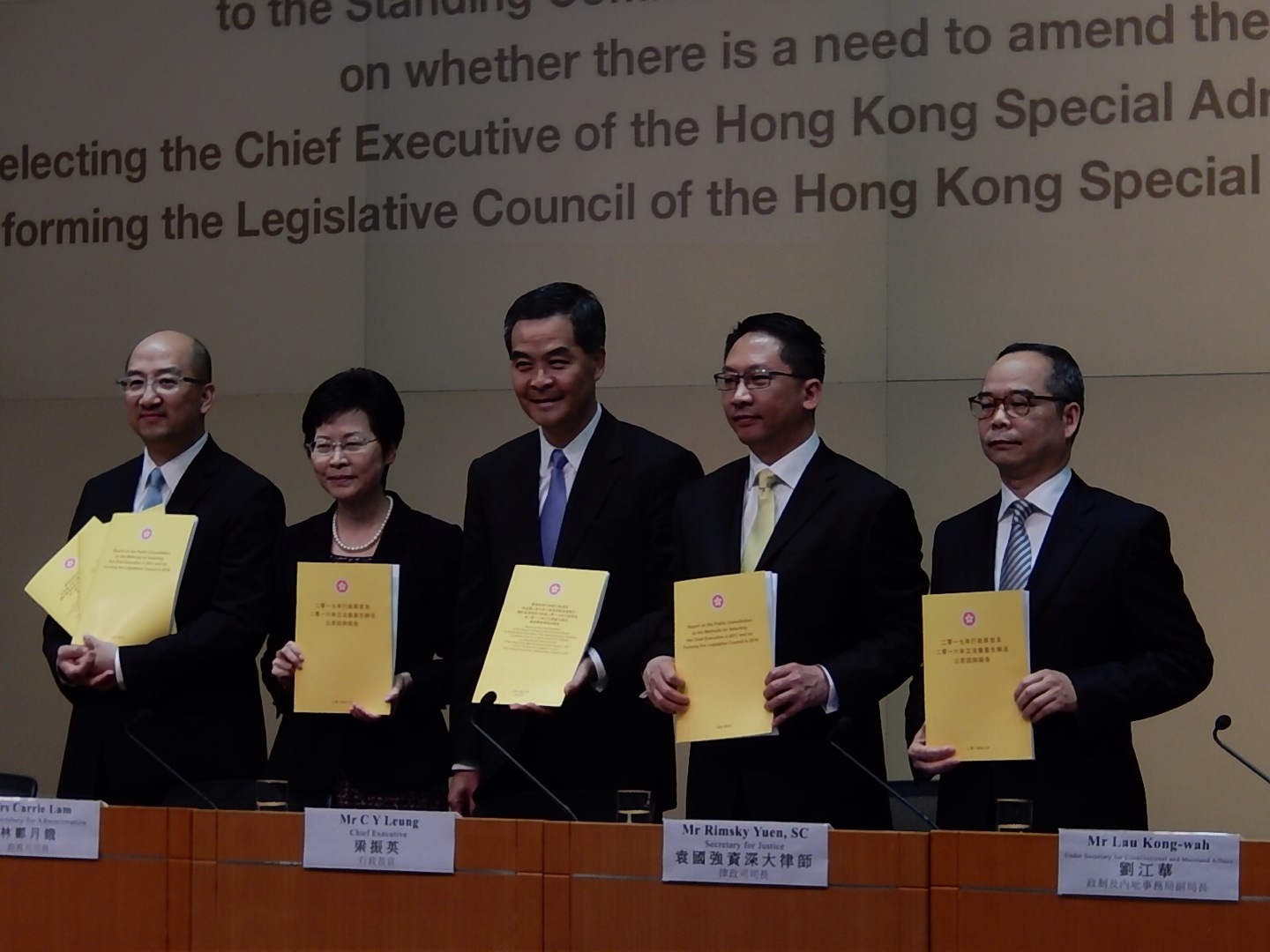
Yuen with other government officials at the press conference on the publication the Consultation Report on 15 July 2014.

In December 2013, Yuen was appointed by Leung Chun-ying as one of the three-member Task Force on Constitutional Development, alongside Chief Secretary for Administration Carrie Lam and Secretary for Constitutional and Mainland Affairs Raymond Tam, in relation to the consultation on the Methods for Selecting the Chief Executive in 2017 and for Forming the Legislative Council in 2016. Yuen provided the legal opinion on the proposed constitutional reform. He opposed the "civil nomination" proposal advanced by pro-democrats, arguing that it might bypass the nominating committee and "turn it into a plastic stamp"

On 21 October 2014, during the Occupy Central movement triggered by the NPCSC's August 31 Decision, the government and the HKFS held the first round of talks in a televised open debate in which Yuen took part as one of the five government representatives. During the talks, government representatives suggested the possibility of writing a new report on the students' concerns to supplement the government's last report on political reform to Beijing, but stressed that civil nomination, as proposed by the students, fell outside the framework of the Basic Law and the NPCSC decision. The government described the talks as "candid and meaningful" in a press release, while the students expressed their disappointment at the lack of concrete results.

After the final legislative bill came out in January 2015, Yuen continued to lobby for support for the proposal. On 25 April 2015 Yuen participated in a territory-wide bus parade to appeal for public support for the city's constitutional reform package on an open-top double-decker bus. The bill was eventually defeated in the Legislative Council on 18 June.

=== Legislative Council oath-taking controversy ===
In October 2016, after the Legislative Council elections resulted in the election of certain pro-Hong Kong independence legislators to the Legislative Council, Yuen and Chief Executive Leung Chun-ying took an unprecedented move to launch a legal challenge against the Legislative Council President Andrew Leung in order to seek the disqualification of two pro-independence Youngspiration legislators-elect Baggio Leung and Yau Wai-ching over the duo's controversial behaviour during the oath-taking ceremony at the inaugural meeting. Despite Yuen repeated statement of not seeking for the NPCSC interpretation of the Basic Law, in November NPCSC interpreted the Basic Law Article 104 and set a framework on how to take the oath and the consequences of not fulfilling it. Yuen refused to resign and defended the NPSCSC interpretation, arguing that both judicial independence and interpretation of Basic Law could co-exist, adding the ruling by Beijing was not targeting the two legislators but instead setting out the general example as an aid to understanding Article 104. On 8 November, hundreds of lawyers joined a silent march against Beijing's interpretation of the Basic Law, claiming it harms judicial independence. As a result, the two legislators were ousted from the Legislative Council by the court on 15 November.

In December 2016 Leung Chun-ying and Rimsky Yuen pursuing after other pro-democrat legislators by lodging another judicial review against four more pro-democracy legislators over their oaths, Lau Siu-lai, Nathan Law, Leung Kwok-hung and Yiu Chung-yim, who were already under legal challenge filed by pro-Beijing supporters. In July 2017, the court ruled the four pro-democracy legislators were to lose their seats.

=== Prosecution against democracy activists ===
Yuen received criticism from activists for his prosecution against protesters and activists, including the Department of Justice’s sentence review applications of 16 activists involved in two 2014 protests. In August 2017, Demosisto party chairman Nathan Law, secretary-general Joshua Wong and former Hong Kong Federation of Students secretary-general Alex Chow were jailed by the Court of Appeal of the High Court, the student leaders who stormed the government’s headquarters in 2014 in the which triggered the Occupy pro-democracy sit-ins. They were originally given community service orders and a suspended jail term in August 2016 by the Court of First Instance, but the Department of Justice decided for pursuing after stiffer penalties by applying for a review. It was reported that Yuen had overruled recommendations by top prosecutors that the government should not seek stiffer sentences. He declined to confirm or deny reports but rejected speculation about "political prosecutions".

The League of Social Democrats held a rally against the decision outside the Lai Chi Kok Reception Centre on the evening of 18 August 2017. Several different organisations held a public protest march on 20 August 2017, which started at the Southorn Playground and ended with a rally at the Court of Final Appeal Building. Protesters focused their criticism on Yuen, following reports that he ignored the advice of top prosecutors in pursuing the appeal. On 1 October 2017, thousands of people joined a rally demanding Yuen to resign, accusing him of damaging the city's human rights by pursuing sentencing reviews of activists.

Yuen approval rating plunged 18 percentage points in August according to a survey conducted by the University of Hong Kong Public Opinion Programme. Yuen’s support rating stood at 46.4 marks, with an approval rate of 31 per cent and a disapproval rate of 33 per cent. His net popularity plunged to negative 3 percentage points. It was speculated that this was "perhaps related to recent events including the sentence review and jailing of some activists." In September 2017, Hong Kong slipped five places in the judicial independence category of the latest global competitiveness ranking compiled by the Geneva-based non-profit organisation World Economic Forum.

=== Express Rail joint checkpoint controversy ===
Despite citing his ill health and wish for retirement after serving a full term, Yuen was listed in the line-up of Chief Executive-elect Carrie Lam's team in June 2017. However there were reports suggesting he would leave in 2018 after sorting out law enforcement issues dogging the Guangzhou–Shenzhen–Hong Kong Express Rail Link project.

In July 2017, Yuen unveiled the proposal to resolve the border control conundrum by setting up joint immigration and customs facilities with mainland authorities in which travellers will have to abide by mainland laws within a designated area to be leased to the mainland for the creation of a port inside the terminal where mainland police officers can enforce mainland laws. The pro-democracy camp and some legal experts argued that the measures would violate the Basic Law as the Articles 18 and 22 prohibit national laws from being applied in Hong Kong (with the exception of matters relating to defence and foreign affairs) and forbid Chinese authorities from interfering in the special administrative region’s affairs. Yuen countered the argument by claiming that the designated areas, once leased to the central government, will no longer be part of Hong Kong’s territory and therefore outside the jurisdiction of the Basic Law. He also invoked Article 20 of the Basic Law, which allows the Hong Kong government to enjoy new powers conferred to it by the NPCSC which the SAR government can seek a "new power" from the NPCSC, so that it can in turn authorise the mainland authorities to enforce national laws in the designated areas.

Yuen stepped down on 6 January 2018 amid the National People's Congress Standing Committee's resolution on the joint checkpoint. Chief Executive Carrie Lam praised him for his "outstanding performance" and being "a pillar of strength in upholding the rule of law in Hong Kong", as well as for his "commitment to the country" and passion for his work. His position was replaced by barrister Teresa Cheng.

== Post Secretary of Justice ==
=== Jimmy Lai ===
In November 2022, Yuen represented Paul Lam on behalf of the Department of Justice, with the argument that Jimmy Lai should not be able to hire a UK lawyer. Yuen argued that overseas lawyers would have "limited if not negligible" contribution to cases relating to the national security law. However, the court disagreed with Yuen's arguments, and said they go "against the grain of guiding principles for the exercise of judicial discretion" and "It is an untenable proposition and not reasonably arguable."

On 25 November 2022, Yuen argued and said that the Department of Justice's position was that except for "exceptional circumstances," all national security cases should ban the use of foreign lawyers.

In April 2023, Yuen urged the court to reject Lai's legal bid as soon as possible.

=== China Concrete ===
In January 2023, Yuen, representing China Concrete, lost a case where he was fighting against the government's Environmental Protection Department. In February 2023, a protest was held at the company's site, which continued to illegally operate. In November 2023, China Concrete lost its latest appeal. A week after losing its appeal, China Concrete was still operating illegally.

== Personal life ==
Yuen is unmarried and has two sisters. His father, a carpenter for the government, died in 2014.

In December 2015, he spent three days in hospital with severe abdominal pain. In 2016, Yuen was admitted to hospital with intestinal discomfort and was on leave for a few days.

Legal offices
Preceded by Philip Dykes	Chairman of Hong Kong Bar Association; 2007–2010	Succeeded by Russell Coleman
Political offices
Preceded by Wong Yan-lung	Secretary for Justice; 2012–2018	Succeeded by Teresa Cheng
Order of precedence
Preceded by Matthew Cheung; Recipients of the Grand Bauhinia Medal	Hong Kong order of precedence Recipients of the Grand Bauhinia Medal	Succeeded by Laura Cha; Recipients of the Grand Bauhinia Medal
