= Michael David Thomas =

Lawyer in Hong Kong

Michael Thomas CMG KC SC

Attorney General of Hong Kong
- In office 1983–1988
- Governor: Sir Edward Youde; Sir David Wilson
- Preceded by: John Calvert Griffiths
- Succeeded by: Jeremy Fell Mathews

Personal details
- Born: 8 September 1933 (age 93)
- Spouse(s): Jane Lena Mary (m. 1958; div. 1978); Gabrielle Blackmore (m. 1981; div. 1988); Lydia Dunn (m. 1988)
- Relations: Cardigan Thomas (father); Kathleen Thomas (mother)
- Education: Chigwell School; London School of Economics; Middle Temple

Michael David Thomas, CMG, KC, SC (born 8 September 1933; Chinese: 唐明治) is a retired barrister, who served as the penultimate Attorney General of Hong Kong before the transfer of sovereignty over Hong Kong in 1997. He served in the post from 1983 to 1988, under the governorships of Edward Youde and David Wilson.

== Early life ==
Thomas was born to parents Cardigan and Kathleen Thomas in southeast England. He attended Chigwell School.

== Education ==
Thomas attended the London School of Economics. He received a Middle Temple Blackstone Entrance Scholarship in 1952. He was called to the Middle Temple and became a barrister in 1955.

== Career ==
=== Practice in England ===
Until 1983, Thomas specialised in commercial and maritime law in England. He was Treasury Counsel for the Ministry of Defence and Royal Navy as a junior and advised on the 'Torrey Canyon' casualty. He acted for the Tribunal at several maritime inquiries and an inquiry into an aircraft crash near Heathrow.

Thomas was made a Queen's Counsel in 1973. He was appointed a bencher of Middle Temple in 1981. He served as Wreck Commissioner from 1970 to 1983 and as a Lloyd's Salvage Arbitrator from 1974 to 1983.

In silk, Thomas appeared as counsel before tribunals in England (including the House of Lords and Privy Council), Singapore, Hong Kong, New York and Lisbon. He sat as Chairman of Boards of Investigation appointed by the UK government and by the Liberian government into shipping casualties.

=== Attorney General of Hong Kong ===
In 1983, Thomas was invited to become Attorney General of Hong Kong and served in that position until 1988. In his capacity as Attorney General, he was a member of the Executive and Legislative Councils and was Joint Chairman of the Law Reform Commission. In 1984, he played a part in the ultimate settlement of the Sino-British Joint Declaration. For this, he was made a Companion of the Order of St Michael and St George (CMG).

=== Practice in Hong Kong and England ===
After finishing his term as Attorney General, Thomas recommenced private practice at the bar in England and Hong Kong, and established himself as a leading advocate. He was a member of Temple Chambers, Hong Kong.

Before his retirement he specialised in appellate advocacy before the Court of Final Appeal or Court of Appeal and cases of judicial review, but stopped undertaking trial work at first instance, either civil or criminal.

He argued in cases on the government's behalf in 2005 and 2009. From 2011 to 2013, Thomas also served as Chairman of the Regulatory Tribunal of the Qatar Financial Centre.

== Retirement ==
Thomas retired from practice at the end of 2013. His last court hearing was in the Hong Kong Court of Appeal in the case of Re Mably. The Court of Appeal in their judgment thanked Thomas for his service to Hong Kong as follows:

We were told that this is the last case in which Mr Thomas would appear in court as counsel. In the circumstances, we consider it appropriate to join Mr Shieh and Mr Jat in paying tribute to Mr Thomas’ contribution to the healthy growth and development of the Hong Kong Bar when he served as the Attorney General of Hong Kong and thereafter as an eminent silk in the local Bar.

== Personal life ==
Thomas has been married three times. By his first wife, Jane Lena Mary, he has four children; David Francis Cardigan born on 16 April 1960; Sian Katharine Mary born on 22 January 1962, Daniel Michael Winston born on 30 January 1965, and Rachel Fiona born on 31 July 1969.

His current wife is Lydia Dunn, Baroness Dunn, who was the Senior Unofficial Member of the Legislative Council of Hong Kong 1985-8 and of the Executive Council of Hong Kong in 1988–92.

Legal offices
Preceded by John Calvert Griffiths	Attorney General of Hong Kong; 1983–1988	Succeeded by Jeremy Fell Mathews
