= Jeremy Fell Mathews =

Jeremy Fell Matthews 馬富善

Attorney General of Hong Kong
- In office 1988–1997
- Governor: Lord Wilson of Tillyorn; Chris Patten
- Preceded by: Michael David Thomas
- Succeeded by: Elsie Leung (Secretary of Justice)

Personal details
- Born: 14 December 1941 (age 84)

Jeremy Fell Mathews, CMG, JP, (馬富善) was the last Attorney General of Hong Kong before 1 July 1997. He served in the post from 1988 to 1997, under the governorship of Lord Wilson of Tillyorn and the last governor, Chris Patten.

== Early life ==
Mathews was born on 14 December 1941. He is the son of George James and Ivy Pricilla Mathews.

He was educated at Palmer's Grammar School in England. He qualified as a solicitor of England and Wales in 1963 and was in private practice in England until 1965, when he moved to Australia. In Australia, he was Deputy District Registrar of the High Court of Australia in Sydney.

== Career in Hong Kong ==
Mathews moved to Hong Kong in 1968, where he was appointed a Crown Counsel. He was appointed deputy Law Draftsman in 1978. In 1982 he was appointed Crown Solicitor, having been appointed deputy the year before. In 1988 he was appointed the final Attorney General of Hong Kong succeeding Michael David Thomas QC. He was the first solicitor to be appointed attorney general in Hong Kong. Mathews was a member of the Hong Kong Legislative Council from 1985 to 1995. He was awarded a CMG in 1989.

Soon after becoming attorney general, Mathews had to deal with three scandals involving the Attorney General's Chambers.

The first involved Christopher Harris, a senior Crown Counsel, who was caught procuring a girl under 12 for sex. On advice from a private barrister, Mathews decided not to prosecute Harris. After a public outcry, and after seeking further advice, he reversed the decision and Harris was convicted and sentenced to 18 months' imprisonment.

Second, the same year, Warwick Reid, the Deputy Director of Public Prosecutions, was investigated for receiving bribes and absconded. Mathews admitted later he allowed Reid to stay in his position even though he knew he was under investigation. (Mathews may have been prevented by the Prevention of Bribery Ordinance from saying anything to Reid to suggest he was under investigation.)

The third was his last-minute intervention in a wounding case involving an English Cathay Pacific pilot Ian Wilkinson. At the criminal trial rather than calling evidence an agreed fact sheet was prepared (without the victim's prior knowledge or consent, which was immediately disputed by the wife's lawyers). The intervention by Matthews raised questions about the administration of justice and the rule of law in Hong Kong as well as the way in which Matthews had handled the matter which had effectively prevented the wife from taking out a private prosecution. Matthews was called before LegCo but refused to explain his decisions. Matthews then made certain statements to the press which were immediately challenged and found to be untrue. The handover of Hong Kong to China prevented this case being further investigated since the Chinese Government said they could not be held responsible for any questionable decisions taken by the previous colonial government and the Lord Chancellor's office claimed it came under the remit of the Foreign Office.

Since early 1990, prominent figures like Elsie Tu have called for Mathews' resignation for lack of leadership and administrative and legal incompetence. Mathews refused to step down.

Mathews served as Attorney General of Hong Kong until 30 June 1997, when Hong Kong's sovereignty was transferred to People's Republic of China. Mathews was quoted on the possibility of a legal vacuum after the handover as saying, "After midnight on the 30th of June, it ain't my problem."

== Retirement ==
Mathews retired after the handover and returned to England. In retirement he has served as deputy district chairman of the Appeals Service and as chairman of the Overseas Service Pensioners' Association.

== Personal life ==
Mathews married Sophie Lee in 1968 and they had two daughters. The marriage was dissolved in 1992 and that year he married Halima Guterres, who is a writer and former journalist with South China Morning Post.

His recreations are reading, gardening and music.

Legal offices
| Preceded by Michael David Thomas | Attorney General of Hong Kong; 1988 – 1997 | Succeeded by Elsie Leung as Secretary for Justice |
