= Solicitor General of Hong Kong =

Law officer in the Hong Kong government

- Incumbent; Llewelyn Mui since 15 September 2022
- Department of Justice
- Type: Law Officer
- Formation: 1947
- First holder: George Strickland

Solicitor General of Hong Kong
- Traditional Chinese: 法律政策專員
Transcriptions
Yue: Cantonese
- Yale Romanization: Faat leuht jing chaak jyūn yùhn
- Jyutping: Faat3 loet6 zing3 caak3 zyun1 yun4

The Solicitor General of Hong Kong is head of the Legal Policy Division of the Department of Justice (律政司) in Hong Kong. He (to date no woman has held the post) is responsible for the development of legal policy, advising the Secretary for Justice (called the Attorney General before 1997) on legal issues, and overseeing the department's staff and legislative programme.

== History ==
The position of Solicitor General in Hong Kong was created after the end of World War II. The Solicitor General acted as the deputy of the Attorney General and regularly appeared in court.

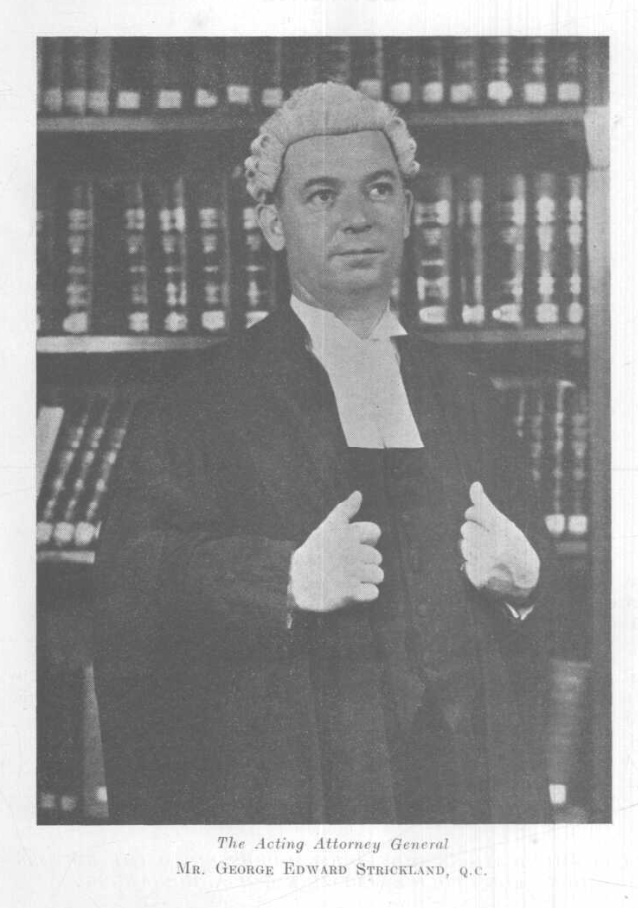
George Strickland QC, first Solicitor General of Hong Kong in 1952 whilst acting as AG

The position was abolished in 1979, but was later reinstated in 1981 as the head of the Legal Policy Division.

The Secretary for Justice is now assisted by five law officers, namely:

- the Solicitor General who heads the Legal Policy Division,
- the Director of Public Prosecutions (formerly Crown Prosecutor) who head the Prosecutions Division,
- the Law Officer (Civil Law) (formerly Crown Solicitor) who heads the Civil Law Division,
- the Law Officer (International Law) who heads the International Law Division, and
- the Law Draftsman who heads the Law Drafting Division

== Current holder ==
Mr. MUI Kei Fat, Llewellyn is the current Solicitor General. He was acting solicitor general for 1 year prior to his substantive appointment. He has served his entire career in the Department of Justice since 1992

Remuneration for the post is as a Law Officer which is Point 6 on the Directorate (Legal) Pay Scale. With effect from 1 April 2024, the pay was HK$287,990 (up from HK$201,950 in 2015) per month, together with housing allowance, 'leave passage allowance', and other benefits.

== List of Solicitors General before 1997 ==
No.	Office holder	Term	Notes
1	George E Strickland, QC	1947-1952	Came to Hong Kong in 1945 as Chief Legal Adviser to British Military Administration. Acting Attorney General prior to appointment. Appointed Attorney General for Sarawak in 1952.
2	Arthur Hooton, QC	1952-1961	
3	Maurice Heenan, QC	1961	Non-British-born (born in New Zealand). Appointed Attorney General in 1961.
4	Denys Roberts, QC	1962-1966	Appointed Attorney General in 1966. Later Colonial/Chief Secretary and Chief Justice.
5	Graham Sneath, QC	1966-1973	
6	John Hobley, QC	12 May - 29 September 1973	Appointed Attorney General in 1973. Retired and left Hong Kong 1979.
7	Garth Thornton	1973-1979	Author of Thornton's Legislative Drafting
	None	1979-1981	Position abolished in 1979; reestablished in 1981.
8	Ray Astin	1981-1984	Full name was Ernest Raymond Astin
9	James Findlay, QC	1984-1986	Later became Judge of the High Court.
10	Frank Stock, QC	1987-1991	Became High Court Judge, Vice President of the Court of Appeal and then Non-Permanent Judge of the Hong Kong Court of Final Appeal
11	Bertrand de Speville	1991-1993	British, born 16 June 1941, (Commissioner of ICAC, 1993-1996)
	Anthony Philip Duckett, QC (Acting Solicitor-General)	1993 - 1994	Australian, born 26 September 1937. (Deputy Director of Public Prosecutions, 1984-1995). Became Judge of County Court of Victoria.
12	Daniel Richard Fung Wah-kin, QC (馮華健)	1994 - 30 Jun 1997	born c1954. Was appointed from private practice; Returned to private practice as senior counsel

== List of Solicitors General After 1997 ==
No.	Office Holder	Tenure Start	Tenure End	Length of Tenure	Appointed By	Prior Role	Silk
1	Daniel Richard Fung Wah-kin, SBS, QC, SC, JP	1 July 1997	30 August 1998	1 year and 61 days	Elsie Leung	Assumed role; was last Solicitor General in British Hong Kong	QC (1990)
2	Robert Charles Allcock, SBS	17 August 2000	24 January 2007	6 years and 161 days	Elsie Leung	Acting Solicitor General / Principal Government Counsel	
3	Ian George McCurdy Wingfield, GBS	25 January 2007	1 August 2010	3 years and 189 days	Wong Yan-lung, SC	Law Officer (International Law)	
4	Frank Poon Ying-kwong	2 August 2010	2 September 2015	5 years and 32 days	Wong Yan-lung, SC	Deputy Solicitor General	
5	Wesley Wong Wai-chung, SC, JP	3 September 2015	30 September 2021	6 years and 28 days	Rimsky Yuen, SC	Deputy Director of Public Prosecutions	SC (2013)
6	Llewellyn Mui Kei-fat	15 September 2022	Incumbent	3 years and 359 days	Paul Lam, SC	Principal Government Counsel	

The incumbent Solicitor General is an unofficial Justice of the Peace, and is given the "JP" designation while in office; this designation is removed upon leaving office, unless officially appointed separately.

== See also ==
- Solicitor General
- Attorney General
- Justice minister
