= Law Reform Commission of Hong Kong =

Hong Kong government commission

- 香港法律改革委員會

Commission overview
- Formed: 15 January 1980
- Preceding commission: Law Reform Committee
- Jurisdiction: Hong Kong
- Headquarters: 9/F, Champion Tower, Three Garden Road, Central
- Commission executives: Secretary for Justice ex officio (Paul Lam), Chairman; Wesley Wong, Secretary
- Parent department: Department of Justice
- Website: www.hkreform.gov.hk

The Law Reform Commission of Hong Kong (Chinese: 香港法律改革委員會) is an independent, non-statutory public body that proposes reforms to the law of Hong Kong.

== History ==
=== Background ===
Before the creation of the present commission in 1980, a number of formal and informal committees and groups had considered matters related to law reform.

A Law Reform Committee was first appointed by Governor Alexander Grantham on 16 March 1956 with a mandate to "examine and consider legislation enacted in the United Kingdom, having regard especially to the reports of the Law Reform Committee appointed by the Lord Chancellor on the 16th June, 1952; and to make recommendations, in the light of local circumstances, for the reform of the laws of the Colony". These terms of reference were rather restrictive, confining the committee to consideration of legislation enacted in the United Kingdom. The committee was chaired by the Chief Justice, with the Attorney General, Registrar General, Chairman of the Bar Association, President of the Law Society, and an unofficial member of the Legislative Council elected from among themselves as members. A senior crown counsel from the Legal Department served as the committee's secretary. In the years from 1957 to 1964, the committee made five reports, covering areas of law ranging from defamation, occupier's liability, and intestacy. The committee made its fifth and final report on 30 December 1964, on misrepresentation, partition, and oaths.

Shortly later, in 1965, a Law Reform Drafting Unit was created in the Attorney General's Chambers to draft law reform proposals that had been approved, and was tasked on the side with identifying UK legislation suitable for adaptation in Hong Kong. Nonetheless, the unit did not have the authority to propose any wider reforms of the law.

=== The modern commission (1980-present) ===
The Law Reform Commission, in its current form, was created by the Governor-in-Council Murray MacLehose on 15 January 1980. The proposal for the creation of a more formal mechanism for law reform was jointly presented to the Executive Council by the Chief Justice and Attorney General. The new commission differed from the old committee in that it would be chaired by the attorney general rather than the chief justice, with its members appointed by the governor.

== Functions ==
The Commission considers and makes proposals for legal reform on matters referred to it by the Chief Justice or the Secretary for Justice and releases its recommendations to the public in the form of a report annually.

The commission also holds the annual Law Reform Essay Competition, which invites law students in Hong Kong to write about potential legal reforms on a preselected topic, with finalists awarded with summer placements at law firms, barristers' chambers, the Department of Justice, or a listed company. The competition has been described as one of the most prestigious essay-writing competitions for law students in Hong Kong.

== Composition ==
The commission, which is chaired by the Secretary for Justice ex officio, is composed of legal academics, practicing lawyers, judges, and lay members, with the Chief Justice and the Law Draftsman as ex officio members. The secretariat of the commission is attached to the secretary for justice's office, with a law officer serving as the commission's secretary. As of 2025, the secretariat has a staff of 8 lawyers. Until December 2020, the secretariat came under the Legal Policy Division of the department, with a principal government counsel serving as secretary. The current secretary is Wesley Wong SC, who served as Solicitor General from 2015 to 2021.

Members of the commission are appointed by the Chief Executive on the advice of the Secretary for Justice and serve renewable three-year terms. The membership of the commission, as of August 2025, is as follows:

Current members of the Law Reform Commission
Member	Appointed by	Start date/length of service	Background	Type					
Member	Appointed by	Start date/length of service	Background	Type	(Chairman) Paul Lam	John Lee	1 July 2022 3 years, 166 days	Secretary for Justice	Ex officio member
Andrew Cheung	Carrie Lam	11 January 2021 4 years, 337 days	Chief Justice of the Court of Final Appeal	Ex officio member					
Michael Lam	Carrie Lam	11 March 2021 4 years, 278 days	Law Draftsman	Ex officio member					
Johnson Lam	Carrie Lam	1 September 2021 4 years, 104 days	Permanent Judge of the Court of Final Appeal	Non-ex officio member					
May Chan	Carrie Lam	1 March 2020 5 years, 288 days	Chairman of Journalism Education Foundation	Non-ex officio member					
Xi Chao	John Lee	1 March 2025 288 days	Dean, Faculty of Law, The Chinese University of Hong Kong	Non-ex officio member					
Stephen Hung	Carrie Lam	1 January 2021 4 years, 347 days	Partner, Li & Partners	Non-ex officio member					
Janice Choi	Carrie Lam	1 March 2021 4 years, 288 days	Advisor and Legal Director, Sunwah Group	Non-ex officio member					
Chak-ming Chan	Carrie Lam	1 May 2021 4 years, 227 days	Consultant, Anthony Siu & Co. Solicitors & Notaries	Non-ex officio member					
Margaret Leung	Carrie Lam	1 May 2021 4 years, 227 days	Former Global Co-Head of Commercial Banking, HSBC Group, and former Vice-Chairman and Chief Executive of Hang Seng Bank Ltd	Non-ex officio member					
Alexander Loke	John Lee	1 March 2023 2 years, 288 days	School of Law, City University of Hong Kong	Non-ex officio member					
Michael Jackson	John Lee	1 January 2024 1 year, 347 days	Assistant Dean, Faculty of Law, The University of Hong Kong	Non-ex officio member					
Frances Lok SC	John Lee	1 January 2025 347 days	Barrister	Non-ex officio member					

== See also ==
- Law commission
- Law Commission (England and Wales)
- Law Reform Committee
