= Philip Dykes =

Chairman of the Hong Kong Bar Association

Philip Dykes KC SC
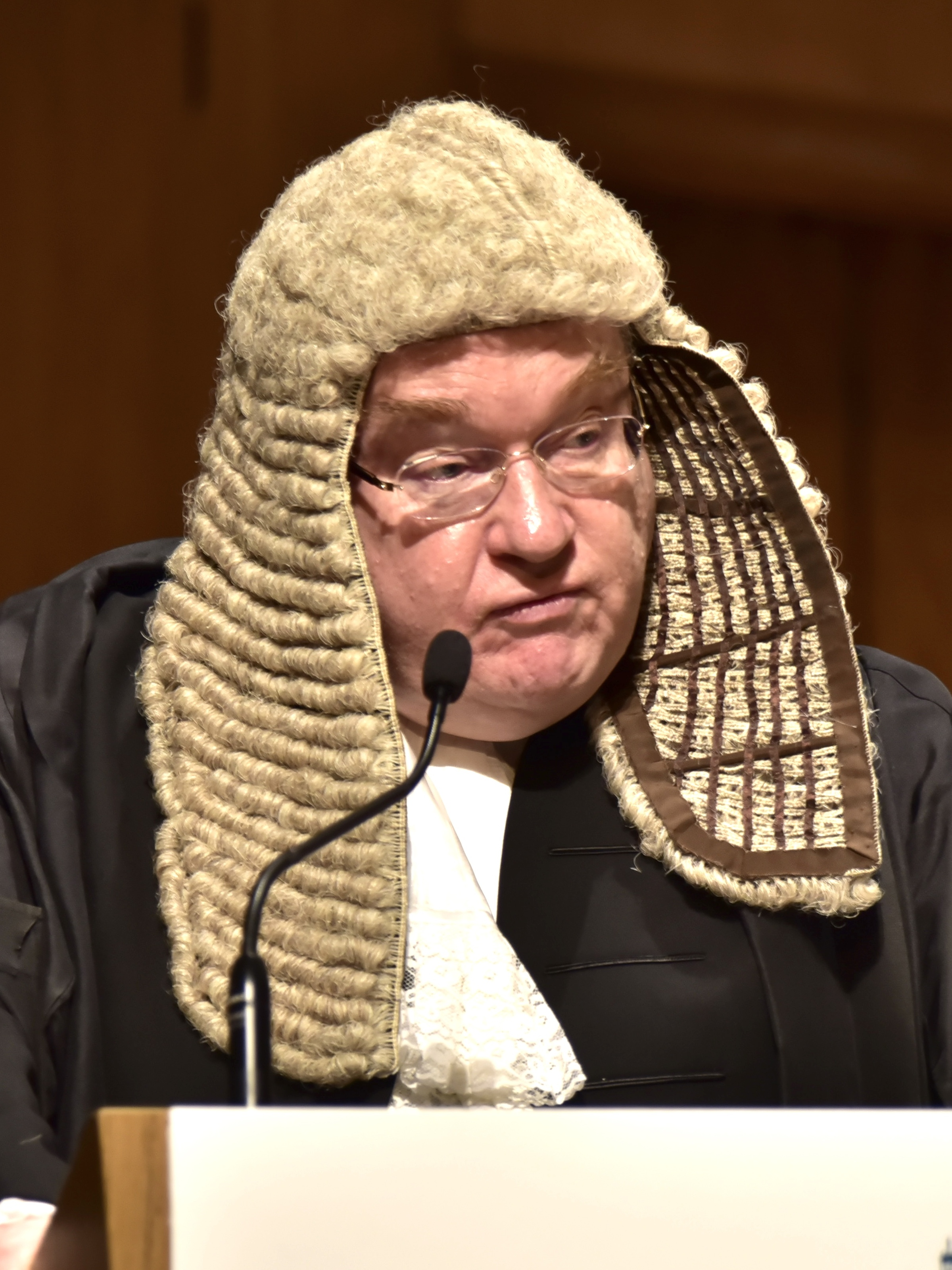
- Dykes in 2020

Chairman of the Hong Kong Bar Association
- In office January 2018 – January 2021
- Preceded by: Paul Lam
- Succeeded by: Paul Harris
- In office January 2005 – January 2007
- Preceded by: Edward Chan
- Succeeded by: Rimsky Yuen

Personal details
- Born: 2 June 1953 (age 73) Warrington, Lancashire, England
- Children: Rebecca, Harriet and Sebastian
- Education: Lincoln College, Oxford; Lincoln's Inn

Philip John Dykes
- Traditional Chinese: 戴啓思
- Simplified Chinese: 戴启思
Transcriptions
Standard Mandarin
- Hanyu Pinyin: Dài Qǐsī
Yue: Cantonese
- Yale Romanization: Daai Kái Sī
- Jyutping: Daai^{3} Kai^{2} Si^{1}

Philip John Dykes KC SC (Chinese: 戴啓思; born 2 June 1953) is a Hong Kong barrister and was the Chairman of the Council of the Hong Kong Bar Association from 2018-2021. He had already served in that position from 2005 to 2007. Dykes developed a practice in constitutional and administrative law and has emerged as a voice defending the rule of law in Hong Kong.
