= Parliamentary counsel =

Lawyers who prepare legislation that it is proposed to pass into law

Parliamentary counsel are lawyers who prepare drafts of legislation to be passed into law. The terms parliamentary drafter, parliamentary draftsman, legislative drafting officer and legislative counsel are also widely used.

These terms are used in relation to the United Kingdom parliament in Westminster, and other parliaments and assemblies based on the Westminster system. The official title, and organisation, of the parliamentary counsel varies between legislatures. For example, those who draft government legislation for the UK parliament form the Office of the Parliamentary Counsel (established in 1869) while the Scottish Government's Parliamentary Counsel Office drafts legislation for the Scottish Parliament, the (Northern Irish) Office of the Legislative Counsel drafts legislation for the Northern Ireland Assembly and the (Welsh) Office of the Legislative Counsel performs the same role in relation to the Senedd. In the Republic of Ireland, there is an Office of the Parliamentary Counsel to Government. In Australia, the federal government has an Office of Parliamentary Counsel, and so does each state and territory. In Hong Kong, the Law Draftsman heads the Department of Justice's Law Drafting Division.

The job of a parliamentary drafter is to draft the detailed form of proposed laws, in a way that will accurately reflect the intentions of the politicians who are promulgating them, without leaving loopholes or producing perverse results. This is a difficult task, and the pursuit of exact and watertight legislation has often resulted in obscure and convoluted language. Such language has been criticised both by government bodies such as the committee under Sir David Renton that reported in 1975 (and recommended drafting which was more based on principles than specific details to address every possible situation). However, the role itself can be fulfilling, especially for anyone intrigued by law itself. As noted by Neil Shah, who describes the job as "without doubt, the most demanding and challenging legal job I’ve ever had. But it has also been the most intellectually stimulating".

In parliamentary discussion, the drafter is rarely, if ever, referred to by name, but only as an office. However, the post has been held by a number of distinguished lawyers, for example Bernard O'Dowd in Australia, John Ferguson McLennan specialising in Scots law (which though enacted entirely in the UK parliament from 1707 until 1999, is distinct from English law), and William Philip Schreiner in South Africa.
