= Law Draftsman =

Law officer in charge of drafting legislation in Hong Kong

- 法律草擬專員
- Incumbent; Michael Lam since 16 March 2021
- Department of Justice
- Status: Law Officer
- Reports to: Secretary for Justice
- Appointer: Chief Executive
- Precursor: Legal Draftsman
- Formation: 20 February 1964
- Salary: HKD 287,990 (monthly)

The Law Draftsman (Chinese: 法律草擬專員) is the head of the Law Drafting Division (Chinese: 法律草擬科) of the Department of Justice in Hong Kong, which is responsible for drafting all primary and secondary legislation proposed by the government. The law draftsman is one of six Law Officers in the government.

== History ==
The first mention of a Legal Draftsman in statute was in the Legal Officers Ordinance 1950, which merged the offices of the Attorney General, Crown Solicitor, and other legal officers into a single Legal Department. The Legal Draftsman was included in the definition of "Legal Officer", which also included the Attorney General, Solicitor General, Crown Solicitor, and Crown Counsel.

The present title of Law Draftsman only appeared in 1964, when the Legal Officers Ordinance (Amendment of Schedule) Order 1964 was enacted on 20 February 1964 to insert the position of Law Draftsman, among others, into the schedule of the ordinance.

== Role ==
The law draftsman is the head of the Law Drafting Division and the Keeper of the Statute Book. Ranked at Directorate (Legal) Pay Scale point 6, which is equivalent to the head of a subordinate department, the Law Draftsman oversees three sub-divisions, each headed by a Deputy Law Draftsman ranked at DL5. The Law Draftsman often appears before the Legislative Council to speak on matters related to legislation, and is an ex-officio member of the Law Reform Commission. The Law Draftsman also served as the Counsel to the Legislature until 1995, when the Standing Orders of the Legislative Council were amended to name the Legal Adviser of the Legislative Council Secretariat as counsel instead.

At least three Law Draftsmen, including Eamonn Moran, Paul Wan and Theresa Johnson, were recruited from the Office of Parliamentary Counsel in Australia.

== The Law Drafting Division ==
The division also oversees the operation of Hong Kong e-Legislation, which is Hong Kong's official online legislation database.

== List of Law Draftsmen ==
No.	Law Draftsman	Term start	Term end	Term length
-	Edward Sainsbury (acting)	~1950		
	Henrique Alberto de Barros Botelho	December 1960	December 1966	
	J.F. McKeon	2 October 1967	May 1972	
	Gerald Paul Nazareth	23 May 1979 (Note: Either February or May 1979)	8 August 1984	
	James O'Grady	November 1984	20 November 1990	
	James Kerr Findlay	1990	1994	
	Tony Yen Yuen-ho	1994 (Note: Acting from September 1994 to July 1995)	25 March 2007	
-	Gilbert Mo Sik-keung (acting)	25 March 2007	25 June 2007	
-	Nilmini Dissanayake (acting)	25 June 2007	25 September 2007	
	Edward Patrick Aquinas Moran (Note: Also known as Eamonn Patrick Aquinas Moran)	January 2008	1 July 2012	
-	Gilbert Mo Sik-keung (acting)	1 July 2012	1 October 2012	
	Paul Wan How-leung	October 2012	October 2015	
	Theresa Ann Johnson	4 January 2016	3 January 2020	4 years
-	Fanny Ip Fung-king (acting)	4 January 2020	15 March 2021	
	Michael Lam Siu-chung	16 March 2021	Incumbent	
