= Henry Charles Sirr =

British lawyer, diplomat and writer

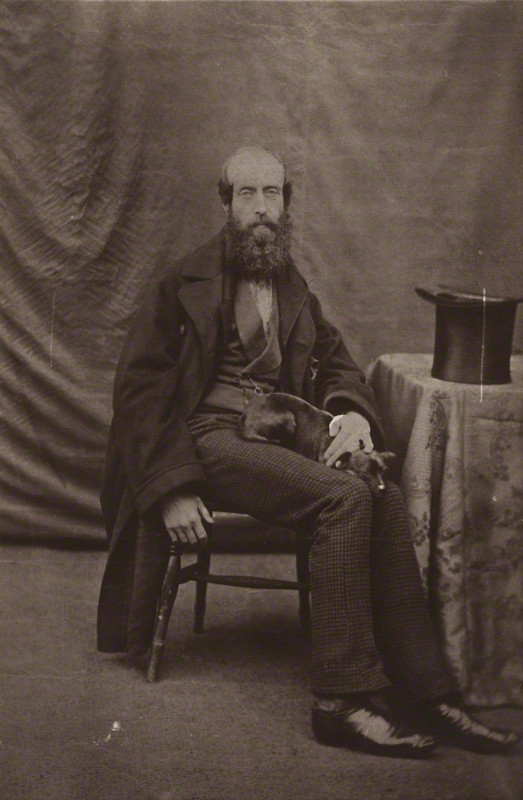
Photograph of Sirr, c.1860.

Henry Charles Sirr (1807–1872) was a British lawyer, diplomat, and writer. He graduated from Trinity College, Dublin and became a barrister at Lincoln's Inn, London. Eventually, he entered government service, working as Deputy Queen's Advocate for the Southern Circuit of Ceylon (modern Sri Lanka) in the mid-19th century.

He was the son of Henry Charles Sirr, Town Major of Dublin, and Eliza D'Arcy. His older brother was Rev. Joseph D'Arcy Sirr.

He is perhaps best known for writing Ceylon and the Cingalese, a book published in two volumes in 1850 covering "their History, Government and Religion; the Antiquities, Institutions, Revenue and Capabilities of the Island; and a full Account of the late Rebellion; with Anecdotes illustrating the Manners and Customs of the People." The book was widely regarded as an authoritative account of life in Ceylon. It was cited by Jules Verne in his 1870 novel Twenty Thousand Leagues Under the Seas; in chapter 2, the book's narrator, Professor Aronnax, tells the reader that while searching for a description of Ceylon in Captain Nemo's library aboard the Nautilus, "I found a book by H.C. Sirr, Esq, entitled Ceylon and the Cingalese."

He became Secretary of the Anglo-Portuguese Commission from 1842 to 1843 and then served as British Vice-Consul at Hong Kong in 1843. He described his experiences in another book, China and the Chinese, subtitled: "Their religion, character, customs and manufactures; the evils arising from the opium trade; with a glance at our religious, moral, political and commercial intercourse with the country." The book provides important contemporary insights into the nature of the opium trade and the endemic smuggling that took place in the Pearl River region.

Sirr, along with Paul Ivy Sterling, was one of the first two barristers admitted to practice before the Supreme Court of Hong Kong at its first sitting on 1 October 1844.

In 1859, he met and married Louisa Rix in London.

== Arms ==
Coat of arms of Henry Charles Sirr
Notes Confirmed 4 December 1899 by Sir Arthur Edward Vicars, Ulster King of Arms. Crest An estoile as in the arms enclosed within two olive branches Proper above on an escroll the motto "Naulae Fida" Escutcheon Azure two chevronels interlaced Argent between three estoiles Or in chief a harp of Ireland above it the Imperial crown both Proper. Motto Lyrae Nervos Aptavi
