= Elsie Leung =

Hong Kong politician and solicitor

The Honourable Elsie Leung Oi-sie GBM, JP
- 梁愛詩
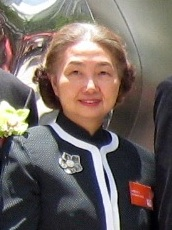

1st Secretary for Justice of Hong Kong
- In office 1 July 1997 – 20 October 2005
- Preceded by: Jeremy Fell Mathews (Attorney General of Hong Kong)
- Succeeded by: Wong Yan-Lung

Personal details
- Born: 24 April 1939 (age 87) British Hong Kong
- Party: Democratic Alliance for the Betterment of Hong Kong (1992–1997)
- Education: University of Hong Kong
- Profession: Solicitor

Elsie Leung
- Traditional Chinese: 梁愛詩
- Simplified Chinese: 梁爱诗
Transcriptions
Standard Mandarin
- Hanyu Pinyin: Liáng Aìshī
Yue: Cantonese
- Jyutping: Loeng^{4} Oi^{3}si^{1}

Elsie Leung Oi-sie, GBM, JP (Chinese: 梁愛詩; born 24 April 1939) is a Hong Kong politician and solicitor. She was Secretary for Justice of Hong Kong from 1997 to 2005 and a member of the Executive Council of Hong Kong.

== Early life and education ==
Leung was born in Hong Kong to a family originating from Nanhai region, Foshan, China. She was educated in Hong Kong, at Chung Wah Middle School (a leftist school shut down by the government), Sacred Heart Canossian College (formerly known as Italian Convent School and Sacred Heart School) and the University of Hong Kong. Leung passed her Law Society Qualifying Examinations in 1967 and obtained her LLM degree from the University of Hong Kong in 1988. She is a past President of the International Federation of Women Lawyers.

== Legal career ==
Elsie Leung qualified as a solicitor in 1967 and entered practice a year later. She was a partner at local law firms P. H. Sin & Co. and Iu, Lai & Li Solicitors, specialising in matrimonial law. She served on various government boards and committees, including the Independent Police Complaints Council, Equal Opportunities Commission, Social Welfare Advisory Committee and Inland Revenue Board of Review. She was also honorary legal adviser to many non-governmental organisations.

== Political career ==
Leung was a founding member of the pro-Beijing Democratic Alliance for the Betterment of Hong Kong (DAB). She was appointed as a Delegate of the People's Congress of Guangdong in 1989. In 1993, she was appointed as a Delegate of the 8th National People's Congress as well as a Hong Kong Affairs Adviser. In the period leading up to the handover, Leung advised the Chief Executive Designate of the Hong Kong Special Administrative Region on legal matters relating to the establishment of the HKSAR.

=== Secretary for Justice ===
On 1 July 1997, Leung became the first Secretary for Justice of the Hong Kong Special Administrative Region, replacing Attorney General Jeremy Mathews. She was the Chief Executive's chief legal adviser and an ex officio member of the Executive Council. She headed the Department of Justice which has a staff of over 1,000, of whom about 290 are lawyers.

As secretary for justice, she was chairman of the Law Reform Commission, the Committee on Bilingual Legal System, the Legal Practitioners' Liaison Committee and serves on numerous committees, including the Fight Crime Committee and the Operations Review Committee of the Independent Commission Against Corruption.

Leung was awarded the Grand Bauhinia Medal in July 2002 for her "distinguished public service", and for her "significant contributions in ensuring the successful implementation of the new constitutional order under the One country, two systems concept". She retired from office in October 2005.

=== Controversies and views ===
Leung was involved in controversy in 1999 when, as Secretary for Justice, she refused to prosecute Sally Aw over the circulation fraud at The Standard. The Hong Kong Bar Association accused her of being "careless" in her handling of the case for failing to ensure that justice was seen to be done. The Democratic Party and the Liberal Party backed legal-sector legislator Margaret Ng's motion of no-confidence. However, during the Legislative Council vote, the Liberal Party objected to government lobbying. It accused the Tung administration of applying "back door" pressure on them to support Leung. The Liberals abstained in the vote, and party deputy chairman Ronald Arculli staged a walk-out.

The Hong Kong government however expressed full confidence in Leung, saying that in all the above cases she had acted entirely in accordance with the Basic Law and the prosecution policy of the Department of Justice.

In March 2021, after Beijing announced changes to restrict the influence of district councillors as well as filtering potential Legislative Council members through the election committee, Leung claimed that Hong Kong could still move towards democracy after things "return to the right track." In April 2021, Leung claimed that moves to ensure only "patriots" serve in the government did not go against the principles of having a "high degree of autonomy," and claimed that such changes were not designed for "taking steps back" in democratic progress.

In November 2022, Leung privately shared that she backed the Court of Final Appeal's decision which allowed Jimmy Lai to hire Tim Owen, and that the NPCSC interpretation to ban foreign lawyers was not necessary, citing Xi Jinping's message that Hong Kong maintain the use of the common law system. However, Leung said she was not opposed to John Lee asking the NPCSC to step in.

== See also ==
- List of graduates of University of Hong Kong

Legal offices
Preceded by Jeremy Fell Mathews as Attorney General of Hong Kong	Secretary for Justice; 1997–2005	Succeeded by Wong Yan-lung
Order of precedence
Preceded by Li Ka-shing; Recipient of the Grand Bauhinia Medal	Hong Kong order of precedence Recipient of the Grand Bauhinia Medal	Succeeded by Charles Lee; Recipient of the Grand Bauhinia Medal
