= Paul Lam =

Hong Kong barrister and politician

The Honourable Paul Lam Ting-kwok GBS SBS SC JP
- 林定國
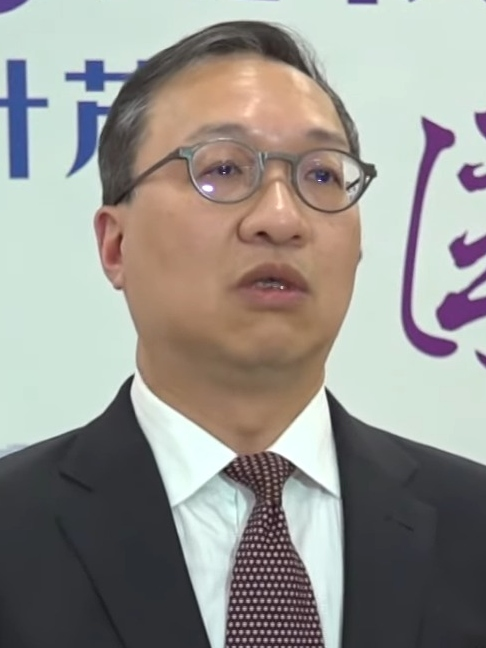

5th Secretary for Justice of Hong Kong
- Incumbent
- Assumed office 1 July 2022
- Appointed by: John Lee Ka-chiu
- Preceded by: Teresa Cheng Yeuk-wah

Chairman of the Hong Kong Bar Association
- In office January 2017 – January 2018
- Preceded by: Winnie Tam
- Succeeded by: Philip Dykes

Personal details
- Born: 26 March 1968 (age 58) Hong Kong
- Spouse: Sheila Yuen Suk-ming
- Education: University of Hong Kong (LLB; PCLL); University of Nottingham (LLM)
- Profession: Barrister

Paul Lam Ting-kwok
- Traditional Chinese: 林定國
- Simplified Chinese: 林定国
Transcriptions

Paul Lam Ting-kwok GBS SBS SC JP (Chinese: 林定國; born March 26, 1968) is a Hong Kong Senior Counsel, currently serving as the 5th Secretary for Justice since July 2022.

== Education ==
Lam was educated at Wah Yan College, Hong Kong. He obtained a Bachelor of Laws (with Second Class Honour Division One) in 1990 and a Postgraduate Certificate in Laws in 1991 from the University of Hong Kong. Thereafter, he obtained a Master of Laws in International Law (with distinction) from the University of Nottingham in 1992.

== Legal career ==
Lam was called to the Hong Kong Bar in 1992. Lam's private practice as a barrister at Parkside Chambers was in general civil proceedings, including commercial law, land law, property and trust law, probate and estate administration, personal injury, medical negligence and defamation cases.

On 26 March 2013, Lam was appointed Senior Counsel by the Chief Justice, Geoffrey Ma Tao-li. Lam took silk on 11 May 2013.

Lam served as Vice Chairman of the Hong Kong Bar Association from 2014 to 2016 and as chairman in 2017. He was also a member of the Special Committee on Discipline and the Special Committee on Pupillage and Limited Practice of the Hong Kong Bar Association.

Lam was elected as the Head of Parkside Chambers, succeeding Clive Grossman SC with effect from 1 September 2018.

In 2019, Lam was appointed as an arbitrator of the Shenzhen Court of International Arbitration for a period of 3 years from 21 February 2019 to 20 February 2022. Lam has also been appointed as an arbitrator of the China International Economic and Trade Arbitration Commission from 1 May 2021 to 30 April 2026.

In 2019, Lam was appointed as Professor at the China University of Political Science and Law.

In 2021, Lam passed the Guangdong-Hong Kong-Macao Greater Bay Area Legal Professional Examination.

== Public service ==
=== Tribunals and statutory bodies ===
Lam served as a member of the Board of Review (Inland Revenue Ordinance) between 2006 and 2014.

Lam was a member of the Appeal Board Panel (Town Planning) from 19 December 2007 to 19 December 2013 and deputy chairman from 19 December 2015 to 19 December 2021.

Lam was an adjudicator of the Registration of Persons Tribunal between 1 December 2008 and 1 December 2014.

Lam was a member of the Amusement Game Centres Appeal Board from 30 May 2010 to 29 May 2016 and chairman from 30 May 2016 to 29 May 2020.

On 16 May 2014, Lam was appointed by the Chief Executive, Leung Chun-ying, as Deputy Chairman of the Administrative Appeals Board for a term of 3 years with effect from 1 June 2014. He was later appointed as Chairman of the Administrative Appeals Board for a term of 3 years with effect from 11 June 2016, and subsequently re-appointed by the Chief Executive, Carrie Lam, for a term of 3 years with effect from 11 June 2019.

Lam was appointed to the Criminal and Law Enforcement Injuries Compensation Boards for a term of 2 years from 19 June 2014 to 18 June 2016. He was subsequently re-appointed and his term was extended to 18 June 2020.

Lam was appointed as a member of the Air Transport Licensing Authority for a term from 1 August 2016 to 31 July 2022.

Lam was appointed as a member of the Trade and Industry Advisory Board from 1 September 2017 to 31 December 2021.

On 7 December 2018, Lam was appointed as Chairman of the Consumer Council for a term of 2 years from 1 January 2019 to 31 December 2020. On 11 December 2020, Lam was re-appointed for a further term of 2 years from 1 January 2021.

=== Law enforcement-related posts ===
Lam served as a member of the Complaints Committee of the Independent Commission Against Corruption between 1 January 2015 and 31 December 2018.

Since 1 January 2019, Lam has served as a member of the Operations Review Committee of the Independent Commission Against Corruption.

Lam was a member of the Panel of Witness Protection Review Board from 1 January 2019 to 31 December 2020.

Lam was appointed a member of the Independent Police Complaints Council from 4 September 2019 to 3 September 2021.

=== Judicial post ===
Lam sat part-time as a Deputy High Court Judge in the Court of First Instance in March–April 2015, February–March 2016, March–April 2017, April–May 2018, February–March and November–December 2019, June–July and December 2020, February–March 2021 and April–May 2022.

While sitting as a Deputy High Court Judge in March 2015, Lam presided over the trial in Lau Oi Kiu v Man Chun Shing and Hau Chi Keung. In his judgment, Lam found that "Hau was a poor witness. He was impatient, defensive and argumentative". Lam held that Hau was involved in the dumping of waste in the land possessed by Lau since early July 2009 and that Hau was liable to Lau for acts of trespass. Lam observed that the "overall impression is that they [i.e. Man and Hau] were contemptuous of the law, and adopted the attitude of “catch me if you can and if you dare”. Their conduct has no place in Hong Kong where the rule of law is of paramount importance".

While sitting as a Deputy High Court Judge in March 2019, Lam presided over the trial in Lai Yiu Mun Susanna v Tsang Kai Choy Paul and others. During the trial, Lam received an email from a door tenant of Parkside Chambers in relation to the case. In view of the contents of the email, Lam decided to recuse himself because "Considering all relevant circumstances as a whole, I was driven to the conclusion that a reasonable, fair-minded and well-informed observer would conclude that there a real possibility (not probability) that I would be influenced subconsciously by extraneous considerations arising out of the content of the Email due to my association with the Sender". In explaining his decision, Lam further stated that "What is at stake is the rule of law. I cannot emphasize more how important it is, at this time in Hong Kong, and indeed as is always the case, to maintain and enhance public confidence in the judiciary and the judicial system as a whole. Public confidence depends on the public’s perception of how the system works in practice. This is why both the reality and the appearance are equally important".

While sitting as a Deputy High Court Judge in June 2020, Lam delivered a decision in Wismettac Asian Foods, Inc. v United Top Properties Limited and others where he reviewed the conflicting case-law on the issue of whether a vesting order can be granted by the court in email fraud cases. He took the view that the word "trustee" in section 52(1)(e) of the Trustee Ordinance (Cap. 29) is broad enough to empower the court to grant a vesting order.

=== Justice of the Peace ===
On 1 October 2020, Lam was appointed a Justice of the Peace.

=== Think tank ===
Lam is an advisor to the Our Hong Kong Foundation.

He is also an honorary advisor to the International Youth Legal Exchange Foundation.

== Secretary for Justice (2022-present) ==
On 19 June 2022, Lam was appointed (pursuant to Article 15 of the Basic Law) by the Central People's Government, on the nomination of the Chief Executive-elect of Hong Kong John Lee Ka-chiu, as the 5th Secretary for Justice of Hong Kong (taking office on 1 July 2022 in the 6th Government of the Hong Kong SAR).

On 20 June 2022, the Hong Kong Bar Association issued a statement welcoming Lam's appointment and expressing "confidence that he will defend the rule of law and the independence of the Judiciary".

In July 2022, Lam stated that the National Security Law is in line with the protection of human rights and freedoms offered by the Basic Law. He said that it is legitimate to restrict freedom of speech in a reasonable manner in order to safeguard national security.

In July 2022, the United States' Congressional-Executive Commission on China recommended that Lam be sanctioned by the US government due to the perception that Lam is "widely expected to continue to oversee the tough prosecutorial approach of his predecessor, Teresa Cheng Yuek-wah, against opposition figures, activists and protesters." Lam said that he would not be concerned about any sanctions. Later, he said he was enraged by the report and that the Department of Justice coworkers "share a bitter hatred of the enemy", and that the Hong Kong government would protect them from sanctions.

In August 2022, Lam ordered a non-jury trial for the city's largest national security case, despite trial by jury being used for 177 years; Lam cited "involvement of foreign elements" as the reason to not have a jury.

In August 2022, Lam criticized Nancy Pelosi's visit to Taiwan. Lam and other government officials were criticized by Lew Mon-hung for "crossing the line" with his statements on Taiwan, as the Basic Law stipulates that diplomatic affairs of Hong Kong are to be handled by mainland China's Foreign Ministry.

In October 2022, after losing a court battle, the government changed the law to give the Secretary of Health the power to invalidate COVID-19 vaccine exemption passes. Lam defended the government and said that the ruling shows Hong Kong is governed by the rule of law. Lam also said that he wanted to "tell a good story of Hong Kong's judiciary" anywhere around the world, and dismissed concerns about Hong Kong falling 3 spots in the World Justice Project Rule of Law Index to #22, saying it was not significant.

On 31 October 2022, Lam said that everyone in Hong Kong must know how to respect and safeguard the constitution.

In November 2022, Lam said that in reference to telling stories about Hong Kong, "We're not brainwashing people, or saying something polished or fabricated." Lam also said that people who protested in the 2019-2020 Hong Kong protest did not understand the legal system.

In December 2022, Lam sent a certificate to the Hong Kong Alliance in Support of Patriotic Democratic Movements of China, "demanding" that the case be held without a jury. Lam claimed it should be held without a jury for three reasons, saying "involvement of foreign factors in the case, protection of personal safety jurors and their family members, and/or if the trial is to be conducted with a jury, there is a real risk that the due administration of justice might be impaired."

In January 2023, Lam wrote in a newspaper and said Western countries were slandering Hong Kong's judicial system, and said "We must strengthen our defence and fight back, both internally and externally."

In April 2023, according to RTHK in reference to the national security law, "Lam said with fewer than 30 people convicted since the legislation was introduced nearly three years ago, everyone would agree that the law affects only an extremely small number of people, when compared to the local population of seven million." However, 249 people had been arrested, with an editorial stating that fewer than 30 convictions could be a sign of deficiency within the legal system.

In May 2023, in regards to Article 23, Lam said "People who are anxious [about it]... what are they afraid of? What did they hear that made them scared?" Lam also said "People are most afraid of that which they don't know. Sometimes they're imaginary fears, sometimes they really have reason to be scared... don't let negative emotions override rational analysis."

In May 2023, Lam said that those found not guilty under the national security law could be arrested again if the government decides to appeal the not guilty verdict.

In May 2023, Lam refused to answer say if mourning victims of the Tiananmen Square massacre would be illegal, and said "I won't assess whether an act is definitely legal or illegal based on hypothetical questions, but I think I shall take this chance to reiterate some existing laws of Hong Kong, which the public should know, and I also believe already know."

In July 2023, Lam filed complaints against two overseas democrats, saying they "made use of their professional capacity as a Hong Kong barrister and a Hong Kong solicitor to lend perceived credibility and authority to their smearing of Hong Kong's judicial system and rule of law, and made slanderous remarks against Hong Kong judges and prosecutors."

In February 2024, Lam warned that media outlets which interview wanted activists may risk abetting the activists.

=== Glory to Hong Kong ===
In June 2023, Lam applied for an injunction to make the song Glory to Hong Kong illegal. In July 2023, the High Court rejected the proposed ban on the song.

=== Jimmy Lai case ===
In August 2022, Lam announced that Jimmy Lai's trial would not use a jury, but be heard by 3 national security judges instead.

In September 2022, Lam opposed an attempt by Lai to hire a lawyer from the UK, with the Department of Justice saying it does not comment on individual cases. In October 2022, the High Court rejected Lam's opposition, and allowed Lai to hire a UK lawyer. Later on 27 October 2022, Lam appealed the High Court's decision, saying the UK lawyer would not add anything significant to the trial. On 9 November 2022, the Lam lost his appeal, with the High Court allowing Lai to hire the lawyer. The High Court also ordered Lam to pay for the legal cost of the appeal.

After Lam and the Department of Justice lost its appeal, former Chief Executive CY Leung criticized the court's decision, and said its judges were "looking to the West for teaching and command" on national security. Lam was asked why he did not respond to Leung's comments and "defend the dignity of the judicial system," and Lam responded that he had no comment.

On 15 November 2022, Lam and the Department of Justice filed a "final" appeal, with the hope of not allowing Lai to use the UK lawyer. In its filing, the DoJ said that hiring foreign lawyers was "incompatible with the overall objective and design of the national security law." The DoJ was represented by Rimsky Yuen. On 21 November 2022, the DoJ again lost its appeal.

On 22 November 2022, the DoJ confirmed that it filed yet another appeal to block Lai from using the UK lawyer.

On 28 November 2022, the Court of Final Appeal ruled that "no appropriate basis has been made out" in Lam's appeal, allowing Lai to hire Tim Owen. The judges wrote that "The secretary for justice had fundamentally changed his case only at the stage of seeking leave to appeal to the Court of Final Appeal, had raised undefined and unsubstantiated issues said to involve national security which were not mentioned or explored in the courts below, and no appropriate basis had been made out for the grant of leave to appeal."

After the decision was announced, John Lee said he would ask the NPCSC to interpret the national security law, in an attempt to block foreign lawyers from being used in national security cases. Lee said that Lam would also seek to adjourn Lai's case from the original 1 December 2022 date until a later time, pending the NPCSC's decision. When Lee was asked whether Lam should be held accountable for losing multiple appeals against Lai, Lee defended Lam's contributions to the city.

Lai's lawyers said that the multiple appeals by Lam had impeded their preparation for the trial.

On 21 December 2022, Lam was ordered to pay HK$855,000 in legal fees to Lai, after Lam failed multiple times to block Lai from hiring Owen.

==== Foreign lawyers ====
In 2021, the DoJ tried to hire a foreign lawyer to represent the government in a national security case. With the Jimmy Lai case, the DoJ said in 2022 that foreign lawyers should be banned from national security cases. HKU professor Simon Young Ngai-man commented and said it was difficult to see why foreign lawyers were a greater national security risk and should be banned, when local Hong Kong barristers could also have multiple citizenships and passports.

Professor Johannes Chan Man-mun, former law dean at HKU, said "How about senior civil servants, senior members of the disciplinary forces, other professionals such as accountants and so on who may have access to sensitive confidential information or state secrets? Are there to be requirements that holders of foreign nationality should not be allowed to hold these positions then? If judges holding foreign nationality are not restricted from trying national security cases, why should lawyers of foreign nationality be restricted from representing their client in national security cases?"

Professor Chan also said "No matter how hard the government tries to tell the international community about the rule of law in Hong Kong, the interpretation would send a completely contradictory message."

Hong Kong's first Secretary of Justice, Elsie Leung, privately shared that she backed the Court of Final Appeal's decision and that the NPCSC interpretation was not necessary, citing Xi Jinping's message that Hong Kong maintain the use of the common law system.

In January 2023, after the NPCSC ruled that the Chief Executive had the power to ban foreign lawyers, Lam supported the decision and said "The interpretation is, by definition, a clarification of the original intent and purpose of those provisions; it does not confer any new power on anyone."

On 24 January 2023, Lam promised that legislation to block foreign lawyers would be implemented in the first half of 2023, and that he would listen to "constructive" viewpoints.

==== US Sanctions ====
On 31 March 2025, the United States Department of State announced sanctions on six Chinese and Hong Kong officials including Paul Lam for their role in the crackdown on democracy advocates in Hong Kong.

Despite facing sanctions similar to those of international child pornographers, human and drug traffickers—having no bank accounts, no credit cards, and being unable to engage with any U.S.-related businesses (including U.S. securities, McDonald's, and Starbucks)— Paul Lam stated that these restrictions have no impact on his daily life and work. He emphasized that fulfilling his constitutional responsibilities has made him "more determined to uphold national security."

Lam often jokes about himself and has described the U.S. as a "bully" like Gian towards the Hong Kong Special Administrative Region government, insisted himself not being Nobi Nobida from Doraemon. In a cable TV interview that same year, he remarked that no one enjoys being sanctioned, but he wouldn't be "so agitated as to jump around like a shrimp." He also mentioned that he feels good mentally, eats well, sleeps well, and experiences no stress, claiming to have even more energy.

On 17 July 2026, the United States Treasury lifted the sanctions on nine of the (former) officials in Mainland China and Hong Kong including Paul Lam, following the ending of state of emergency regarding Hong Kong.

== Honours and awards ==
On 1 July 2021, Lam was awarded the Silver Bauhinia Star by the Chief Executive, Carrie Lam, "in recognition of his significant contribution to the promotion of consumer rights protection through his chairmanship of the Consumer Council, as well as the development of trade and industries in Hong Kong".

On 1 July 2025, Chief Executive John Lee awarded Lam the Gold Bauhinia Star, Hong Kong's second-highest honour, for "outstanding contributions to safeguarding national security".

== Personal life ==
Lam and his family own 3 properties.

Legal offices
Preceded by Winnie Tam	Chairman of Hong Kong Bar Association; 2017	Succeeded by Philip Dykes
Political offices
Preceded by Teresa Cheng	Secretary for Justice; 2022–present	Incumbent
Order of precedence
Preceded by Paul Chan; Financial Secretary	Hong Kong order of precedence Secretary for Justice	Succeeded by Andrew Leung; President of the Legislative Council
