= Office of Parliamentary Counsel (Australia) =

Australian Commonwealth government agency

The Office of Parliamentary Counsel (OPC) is an Australian Commonwealth government agency established under the Parliamentary Counsel Act 1970 (Cth) within the Commonwealth Attorney-General's portfolio. OPC drafts all government Bills that are introduced into the federal Parliament, legislative instruments made by the Governor-General, and a range of other delegated legislation. It also manages the Federal Register of Legislation to provide access to authorised, up-to-date versions of Commonwealth laws.

OPC was established in 1970 and is currently led by Meredith Leigh, First Parliamentary Counsel.

== History ==
Arrangements for the drafting of Commonwealth legislation were put in place at the very beginning of Australia's federation as a nation in 1901. Originally, the Secretary to the Attorney-General's Department was the Parliamentary Draftsman, with a separate position not created until 1946. By 1954, a Parliamentary Drafting Division had been formed within the Attorney-General's Department to draft both Bills and regulations.

After a series of parliamentary reports identified a shortage of drafters and a backlog of drafting work, the statutory agency known as the Office of Parliamentary Counsel was created in 1970.

OPC was initially responsible for drafting both primary and delegated legislation, and for printing laws. However, in 1973 the function of drafting delegated legislation was transferred to the Attorney-General's Department, with OPC retaining responsibility for drafting Bills and amendments of Bills before the Parliament.

The functions of drafting delegated legislation and publishing legislation were transferred back to OPC in 2012.

In OPC's history, Fitting the Bill, Carmel Meiklejohn observes that the role of drafting legislation

demanded specialist skills, not just technical ability but the requisite professional ethos. While the basic criteria - high-level academic qualifications, excellent language skills, imaginative yet systematic thinking, meticulous attention to detail and a degree of diplomacy - were not exclusive to drafting, such onerous and exacting legal work did not appeal to everyone …As the need for professional and experienced drafters grew with the expanding size and complexity of the Commonwealth statute book, greater attention was paid to the recruitment, training and retention of those dedicated to a career in this 'peculiar art'. Some experts avowed that drafters were born, not made, others focused on nurturing drafting skills over time through trial, error and patient training.

== Functions ==
In addition to the three statutory office-holders of First Parliamentary Counsel and two Second Parliamentary Counsel, OPC has around 100 staff employed under the Public Service Act 1999. There are approximately 50 drafters, all of whom are lawyers and who are referred to as parliamentary counsels.

In introducing the legislation establishing OPC, then-Attorney-General Thomas Hughes said

The work of a parliamentary draftsman offers a real challenge to a lawyer: He is involved in the essential processes of government; he has to perform the exacting task of translating what is at times the broadly and even loosely expressed ideas of practicing politicians into legislation that will stand the scrutiny of the courts.

OPC has around 40 publishing staff who develop and operate the Federal Register of Legislation website including managing the registration of new legislation, preparing compilations of Commonwealth legislation and providing editorial services for OPC drafted legislation. OPC continues to work on projects to make historical legislation accessible on the Legislation Register.

OPC also has 20 corporate services staff covering areas such as finance, administration, and IT services.

Under section 3 of the Parliamentary Counsel Act 1970 (Cth) the functions of OPC include:

- the drafting of proposed laws for introduction into either House of the Parliament; and
- the drafting of amendments of proposed laws that are being considered by either House of the Parliament; and
- the drafting of delegated legislation; and
- the preparing of compilations and reprints of, and information relating to, laws of the Commonwealth; and
- the publishing, and the making of arrangements for the printing and publishing, of laws, and proposed laws, of the Commonwealth, compilations, and reprints of laws of the Commonwealth and information relating to laws of the Commonwealth; and
- the preparing and publishing of Government Notices Gazettes, including Special and Periodic Gazettes; and
- functions conferred on OPC (or on First Parliamentary Counsel) under the Legislation Act 2003 (currently these include limited editorial powers for First Parliamentary Counsel and responsibility for promoting the legal effectiveness, clarity and intelligibility of legislative instruments and notifiable instruments) and any other laws of the Commonwealth; and
- with the written approval of the Minister — the provision of assistance to a foreign country in relation to the drafting, printing or publishing of laws of the country or information relating to those laws.

== Federal Register of Legislation ==
The Federal Register of Legislation is the Australian Government's official register of federal legislation, run by the Office of Parliamentary Counsel. It was created by the Legislation Act 2003 incorporating the functions and responsibilities of the now-defunct ComLaw and Federal Register of Legislative Instruments. The Register provides copies of all in force and superseded federal legislation, as well as legislative instruments, Regulations, Determinations, Notifiable Instruments and Administrative Arrangement Orders from 1901 onwards. Most historical legislation may be made available by request. Unedited versions of legislation taken from the Federal Register of Legislation are able to be held as "authorised versions" of such legislation, and are admissible to court.

== List of First Parliamentary Counsels ==
2021 to present: Meredith Leigh

2004 to 2021: Peter Alan Quiggin PSM, QC

1993 to 2004: Hilary Penfold PSM, QC, Centenary Medal

1986 to 1993: Ian Maclean Lindsay Turnbull QC

1981 to 1986: Geoff Kolterman Kolts OBE, QC

1977 to 1981: Bronte Clucas Quayle CB, OBE, QC, Star of Pakistan

1972 to 1977: Charles Kennedy Comans CBE, OBE, QC

1949 to 1972: John Qualtrough Ewens CMG, CBE, OBE, QC

1946 to 1949: Martin Charles Boniwell CBE

1932 to 1946: Sir George Shaw Knowles CBE, OBE, MA, LLM

1901 to 1932: Sir Robert Randolph Garran GCMG, KCMG, CMG, KC

== See also ==
- Attorney-General's Department
