= Secretary for Justice =

Chief legal adviser to the government of Hong Kong

Secretary for Justice of the Hong Kong Special Administrative Region
- 律政司司長
- Emblem of Hong Kong

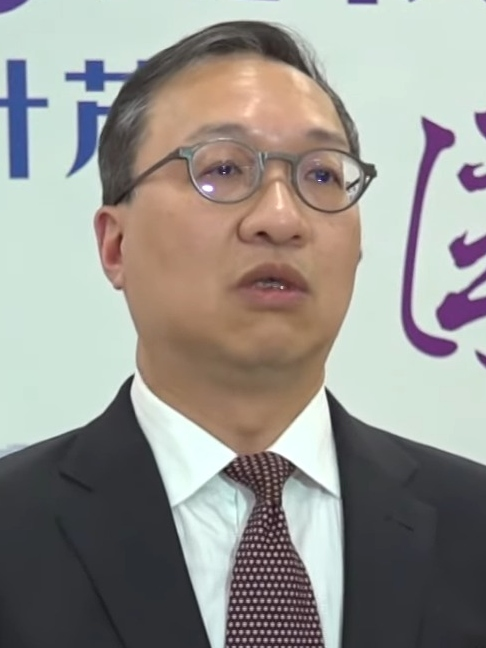
- Incumbent; The Hon Paul Lam, GBS, SC, JP since 1 July 2022
- Style: The Honourable
- Member of: Government Secretariat; Executive Council
- Reports to: Legislative Council
- Residence: 19 Severn Road, The Peak
- Appointer: Central People's Government nomination by Chief Executive
- Term length: No longer than the Chief Executive's remaining term
- Inaugural holder: Elsie Leung
- Formation: 1 July 1997
- Salary: HK$4.2 million p.a.
- Website: DOJ

Secretary for Justice
- Traditional Chinese: 律政司司長
- Simplified Chinese: 律政司司长
Transcriptions
Standard Mandarin
- Hanyu Pinyin: Lǜzhèngsī Sīzhǎng
Yue: Cantonese
- Jyutping: leot6 zing3 si1 si1 zoeng2

The secretary for justice (Chinese: 律政司司長) is the head of the Hong Kong Department of Justice, the chief legal advisor to the chief executive of Hong Kong and the government, and the chief law enforcement officer of the Government of Hong Kong. Before the 1997 handover of Hong Kong, the position was known as the Attorney-General of Hong Kong.

Like all other principal officials, the secretary for justice is appointed by the Central Government on the nomination of the Chief Executive, and is an official member of the Executive Council. The position is normally held by a legal professional, and was before July 2002 a civil service position. The secretary for justice, after the chief secretary and the financial secretary, is the third highest ranking principal official of the Government.

The current secretary for justice is Paul Lam, GBS, SC, JP.

== History ==
=== Before 1997 ===
Before the 1997 handover to China, the position was known as the attorney general (Chinese: 律政司), and the department was known as the Legal Department (Chinese: 律政署) and was also known as the Attorney General's Chambers (Chinese: 律政司署). The attorney general was appointed by the secretary of state in charge of colonial affairs (first the secretary of state for the colonies, later the foreign secretary) in consultation with the Governor.

The office of the attorney general was never localized during British rule and no Hong Kong Chinese ever held this key post.

=== After 1997 ===
The position was renamed as the secretary for justice upon the transfer of sovereignty from the United Kingdom to China. Upon her appointment on 1 July 1997, Elsie Leung became the first woman and first Hong Kong Chinese to hold the post. She was also the second solicitor to serve in the role.

With the introduction of the Principal Officials Accountability System in 2002, the position has been filled by political appointees instead of civil servants.

== Role and duties ==
=== Constitutional and statutory duties ===
Article 63 of the Basic Law empowers the Department of Justice to control all prosecutions, free from interference. As the head of the Department of Justice, the secretary of justice is required to discharge this constitutional duty independently, and has ultimate prosecutorial discretion. However, this discretion is typically exercised by the Director of Public Prosecutions on behalf of the secretary for justice.

The secretary for justice represents the government in all civil lawsuits against it, and as guardian of the public interest, may intervene in any case and bring applications for judicial review to enforce the public interest.

Under Article 53 of the Basic Law, the secretary for justice is the third in line, after the chief secretary and the financial secretary, to act as chief executive when he or she is on leave, outside Hong Kong, or when the position is otherwise temporarily vacant.

The secretary for justice also has a number of ex-officio roles, including being the Chairman of the Law Reform Commission, Vice-chairman of the Fight Crime Committee, and serves a member on the Chief Secretary for Administration's Policy Committee, the Judicial Officers Recommendation Commission and the Independent Commission Against Corruption's Operations Review Committee.

The secretary for justice ranks fifth in the Hong Kong order of precedence.

=== Deputies ===
In the course of discharging his or her duties as the chief legal advisor to the government, the secretary for justice is assisted by six law officers, namely:

- the Solicitor General who heads the Constitutional and Policy Affairs Division,
- the Director of Public Prosecutions who heads the Prosecutions Division,
- the Law Officer (Civil Law) (formerly the Crown Solicitor) who heads the Civil Law Division,
- the Law Officer (International Law) who heads the International Law Division,
- the Law Draftsman who heads the Law Drafting Division, and
- the Law Officer (National Security) who heads the National Security Prosecutions Division

(The Administration and Development Division is headed by an Administrative Officer.)

== Official residence ==
The secretary for justice has an official residence at 19 Severn Road, The Peak. The residence was opened in 1934 for the use of the then attorney general of Hong Kong.

== List of secretaries and attorneys general ==
=== Attorneys general, 1844–1997 ===
No.	Portrait	Name	Took office	Left office	Notes	Ref
1		Paul Ivy Sterling	28 July 1844	15 April 1855	First Attorney General (AG) of Hong Kong. Later appointed Puisne Judge in Ceylon 1855 and acting Chief Justice 1860.	
2		Thomas Chisholm Anstey	30 January 1855	30 January 1859	Former member of British Parliament 1847–1852. Practiced at Bombay bar after retirement.	
3		William Adams	7 September 1859	24 August 1860	Did not act as AG and was appointed acting Chief Justice immediately on arrival in Hong Kong and then appointed as Chief Justice of Hong Kong.	
4		Sir John Smale	22 April 1861	23 October 1866	Appointed Chief Justice of Hong Kong 1866	
5		Sir Julian Pauncefote	1866	1873	Appointed Chief Justice of the Leeward Islands 1874. Later had a very illustrious career in the Foreign Office. Became Lord Pauncefote in 1899.	
6		Sir John Bramston	1873	1876	Appointed Assistant Under Secretary of State in the Colonial Office 1876.	
7		Sir George Phillippo	1876	1879	First non-British-born AG, Phillippo was born in Jamaica. He left to become Chief Justice of Gibraltar 1879 to 1882 and returned to appointed Chief Justice of Hong Kong 1882. In 1897 he became British High Consul in Geneva, Switzerland.	
8		Sir Edward O'Malley	1880	1889	Appointed Chief Justice of the Straits Settlements 1889 and Chief Justice of British Guiana 1895.	
9		Sir W. Meigh Goodman, QC/KC	1890	1902	Appointed Chief Justice of Hong Kong 1902.	
10		Sir Henry Spencer Berkeley, KC	2 May 1902	29 July 1907	Previously Chief Justice of Fiji 1889–1902. Retired to practice at Hong Kong bar 1906, but acted as AG in 1909.	
11		Sir William Rees-Davies, KC	1907	1912	Appointed Chief Justice of Hong Kong 1912.	
12		Sir John Bucknill, KC	1912	1914	Appointed Chief Justice of the Straits Settlements 1914 and Puisne Judge of the Patna High Court in Patna, British India 1920.	
13		Sir Joseph Kemp, KC	1914	1930	Puisne Judge, Hong Kong, prior to appointment 1913–1914. Next appointed Chief Justice of Hong Kong 1930.	
14		Sir C. Grenville Alabaster, KC	1930	1941	Interned in Stanley Internment Camp during World War II and retired after the war.	
British administration suspended during Japanese occupation during World War II. Military Government from August 1945 to March 1946.
15		John Bowes Griffin, KC	1 December 1946	12 May 1952	Appointed in December 1946. G.E. Strickland, acted as AG before Bowes Griffin's appointment. Bowes Griffin was next appointed Chief Justice of Uganda 1952. Was acting Chief Justice of Northern Rhodesia 1957, Speaker of the Legislative Council in Uganda 1958-1962 and Speaker of the Ugandan National Assembly 1962–1963.	
16		Arthur Ridehalgh, KC/QC	22 August 1952	26 November 1961	Last AG to be a KC. Retired on a pension.	
17		Maurice Heenan, QC	4 December 1961	2 September 1966	Non-British-born (born in New Zealand). Crown Counsel prior to appointment. Resigned to join United Nations as deputy director of the General Legal Division 1966–1973, then as General Counsel for the United Nations Relief and Works Agency (UNRWA) for Palestinian Refugees in Beirut 1973–1977. Died in the United States.	
18		Denys Roberts, QC	3 September 1966	29 September 1973	Appointed Colonial/Chief Secretary (1973–1979) and then Chief Justice of Hong Kong. Retired on a pension.	
19		John Hobley, QC	30 September 1973	3 June 1979	Served as Crown Counsel in Hong Kong 1953–1973, briefly as Attorney General of Bermuda 1972-1973 and Solicitor General of Hong Kong 1973. Retired on a pension in 1979.	
20		John Griffiths, QC	4 June 1979	10 June 1983	Last non-British-born AG - born in Persia (now Iran). Entered private practice at the English and Hong Kong bars after retirement until 2012.	
21		Michael Thomas, QC	11 June 1983	30 March 1988	Last QC to be AG. Entered private practice at Hong Kong and English bars after retirement.	
22		Jeremy Mathews	1 April 1988	30 June 1997	First solicitor to be appointed AG. Last AG. Retired at end of British rule in Hong Kong.	

=== Secretaries for justice, 1997–present ===
Political party: Nonpartisan

No.	Portrait	Name	Term of office		Duration	Chief Executive	Term	Ref
1		Elsie Leung Oi-sie 梁愛詩	1 July 1997	20 October 2005	8 years and 112 days	Tung Chee-hwa (1997–2005)	1	
1		Elsie Leung Oi-sie 梁愛詩	1 July 1997	20 October 2005	8 years and 112 days	Tung Chee-hwa (1997–2005)	2	
1		Elsie Leung Oi-sie 梁愛詩	1 July 1997	20 October 2005	8 years and 112 days	Donald Tsang (2005–2012)	2	
2		Wong Yan-lung, SC 黃仁龍	20 October 2005	30 June 2012	6 years and 255 days	Donald Tsang (2005–2012)	2	
2		Wong Yan-lung, SC 黃仁龍	20 October 2005	30 June 2012	6 years and 255 days	Donald Tsang (2005–2012)	3	
3		Rimsky Yuen Kwok-keung, SC 袁國強	1 July 2012	5 January 2018	5 years and 189 days	Leung Chun-ying (2012–2017)	4	
3		Rimsky Yuen Kwok-keung, SC 袁國強	1 July 2012	5 January 2018	5 years and 189 days	Carrie Lam (2017–2022)	5	
4		Teresa Cheng Yeuk-wah, SC 鄭若驊	6 January 2018	30 June 2022	4 years, 176 days	Carrie Lam (2017–2022)	5	
5		Paul Lam Ting-kwok, SC 林定國	1 July 2022	Incumbent	4 years and 69 days	John Lee (2022–present)	6	

==== Deputy secretaries for justice, 2022–present ====
Political party: Nonpartisan

No.	Portrait	Name	Term of office		Duration	Chief Executive	Term	Ref
1		Horace Cheung Kwok-kwan 張國鈞	1 July 2022	Incumbent	4 years and 69 days	John Lee (2022–present)	6	

== See also ==
- Attorney general
- Justice minister
- Minister of Justice (France), who performs similar functions to his or her Hong Kong counterpart
