= Department of Justice (Hong Kong) =

Hong Kong government department

- 律政司

Agency overview
- Formed: 1844; 182 years ago (as Attorney General's Department); 1 July 1997; 29 years ago
- Headquarters: G/F, Main Wing, 6/F, Main and East Wing, Justice Place, 18 Lower Albert Road, Central, Hong Kong 5-7/F, High Block, Queensway Government Offices, 66 Queensway, Hong Kong
- Motto: Rule of Law and Justice for All
- Employees: 1,512
- Annual budget: $2.454 billion HKD (2025)
- Minister responsible: Paul Lam, Secretary for Justice
- Child agencies: · Prosecutions Division; · Civil Division; · Legal Policy Division; · Law Drafting Division; · International Law Division; · Administration and Development Division
- Website: www.doj.gov.hk

Department of Justice
- Chinese: 律政司
- Cantonese Yale: Leuht jing sī
Transcriptions
Standard Mandarin
- Hanyu Pinyin: Lǜzhèngsī
Yue: Cantonese
- Yale Romanization: Leuht jing sī
- Jyutping: Leot^{6} zing^{3} si^{1}

The Department of Justice (DoJ) is the department responsible for legal policy, the administration of justice, drafting legislation, and providing legal advice to the government in Hong Kong. It is headed by the Secretary for Justice, who reports to the Chief Executive directly. Paul Lam, a barrister, has served as Secretary for Justice since July 2022.

Before 1997, the names of the department and the position was the Legal Department (律政署) and Attorney General (律政司) respectively. The Department of Justice provides legal advice to other departments in the government system, “drafts government bills, makes prosecution decisions, and promotes the rule of law”.

== History ==
=== Before 1997 ===
The department has its roots in the Office of the Attorney General, which was created in 1844 upon the appointment of the first Attorney General of Hong Kong.

The department was established in 1950 as the Legal Department, also known as the Attorney General's Chambers, and was itself the product of a merger between the Attorney General's Office and the Crown Solicitor's Office.

Lawyers working in the government were known as Crown counsel, with the heads of the prosecutions and civil divisions known as the Crown Prosecutor and Crown Solicitor respectively.

=== After 1997 ===
==== Protest and national security cases (2019-) ====
In March 2021, after 15 of 47 pro-democracy figures were granted bail by a court, the DoJ immediately filed an appeal, sending the 15 people back to their detention cells.

Also, in March 2021, Hong Kong Free Press reported that 3 defendants were acquitted of rioting because they were not physically present at the riot, with the DoJ later complaining to the Court of Final Appeal that the acquittal was erroneous and that people could still be participants in a crime even if not physically present, such as by using social media and pressing the "like" button.

In April 2021, a spokesman for the DoJ commented on US ambassador Hanscom Smith's criticism of Hong Kong's arrest of Jimmy Lai, claiming that "It is regrettable to note that the convictions have drawn unfair criticisms with political overtones. Any assertion to suggest that 'Beijing [is] eroding Hong Kong's freedoms' is totally baseless."

Separately, in April 2021, the DoJ asserted that in cases involving the national security police, the police would be exempt from laws that cover the search and seizure of journalists' material. In response, the Hong Kong Journalists Association said that the move would make it more difficult for journalists to protect their sources.

Also, in April 2021, after the sentencing of Jimmy Lai and other pro-democracy figures drew criticism from overseas politicians, the DoJ released a statement saying that though the government attaches great importance to rights and freedom, those freedoms are not absolute.

In December 2022, the DoJ said criticisms were "far from the truth" when the CEO of Maxwell Chambers said, "Hong Kong, in particular, was one place where some parties with very long-term contracts avoided putting it as the seat of arbitration, due to uncertainty about the legal environment after Hong Kong returned to China, even with assurances of 50 years of self-government and freedom of speech."

In August 2023, after the High Court blocked the DoJ from banning the song Glory to Hong Kong, the DoJ appealed and claimed that the Chief Executive should have more power than the courts, for national security matters.

== Organisation ==
=== Leadership offices ===
- Secretary for Justice's Office
  - Law Reform Commission Secretariat
  - Legal Enhancement and Development Office
  - Public Relations & Information Unit

=== Divisions ===
Division	Head of Division	Responsibility
Civil Division	Law Officer (Civil Law)	Provides legal advice on civil law to all Government bureaux and departments and represents the Government both as solicitors and as barristers in all civil litigation, including arbitrations
Constitutional and Policy Affairs Division	Solicitor General	In charge of legal policy, constitutional development and elections, the Basic Law, human rights, and China law
International Law Division	Law Officer (International Law)	Provides advice on public international law to the Government and negotiates, or provides legal advisers on negotiations, for bilateral agreements. Also handles mutual judicial assistance matters. Previously advised on the Sino-British Joint Declaration and the Joint Liaison Group.
Law Drafting Division	Law Draftsman	Drafting all Government legislation, vetting private bills, and maintaining the Hong Kong e-Legislation database
National Security Prosecutions Division	Law Officer (National Security)	Prosecution of offences endangering national security and other related legal work. The NS Prosecutions Division budget is drawn from the National Security Special Fund, and not from the DoJ budget.
Prosecutions Division	Director of Public Prosecutions	Handles prosecutions and appeals in the majority of criminal cases, and advises the government on criminal law aspects of proposed legislation
Administration and Development Division	Director of Administration and Development	Responsible for general administration, personnel and staff management, finance, and training

=== Boards and committees ===
- The Law Reform Commission of Hong Kong
- Standing Committee on Legal Education and Training
- Advisory Body on Third Party Funding of Arbitration and Mediation
- Advisory Body on Outcome Related Fee Structures for Arbitration
- Steering Committee on Rule of Law Education
- Guangdong-Hong Kong-Macao Greater Bay Area Task Force
- Expert Advisory Group on Legal and Dispute Resolution Services

== Ministers ==
The department has four political appointees, with principal officials in bold:

Minister	Portrait	Office	Took office
The Hon. **Paul Lam** GBS SC JP		Secretary for Justice	1 July 2022
The Hon. **Horace Cheung** SBS JP		Deputy Secretary for Justice	1 July 2022
Denise Hung Hiu-king		Political Assistant to the Secretary for Justice	1 September 2022
Nicole Chan Sin Man		Political Assistant to the Deputy Secretary for Justice	22 July 2022

== Headquarters ==
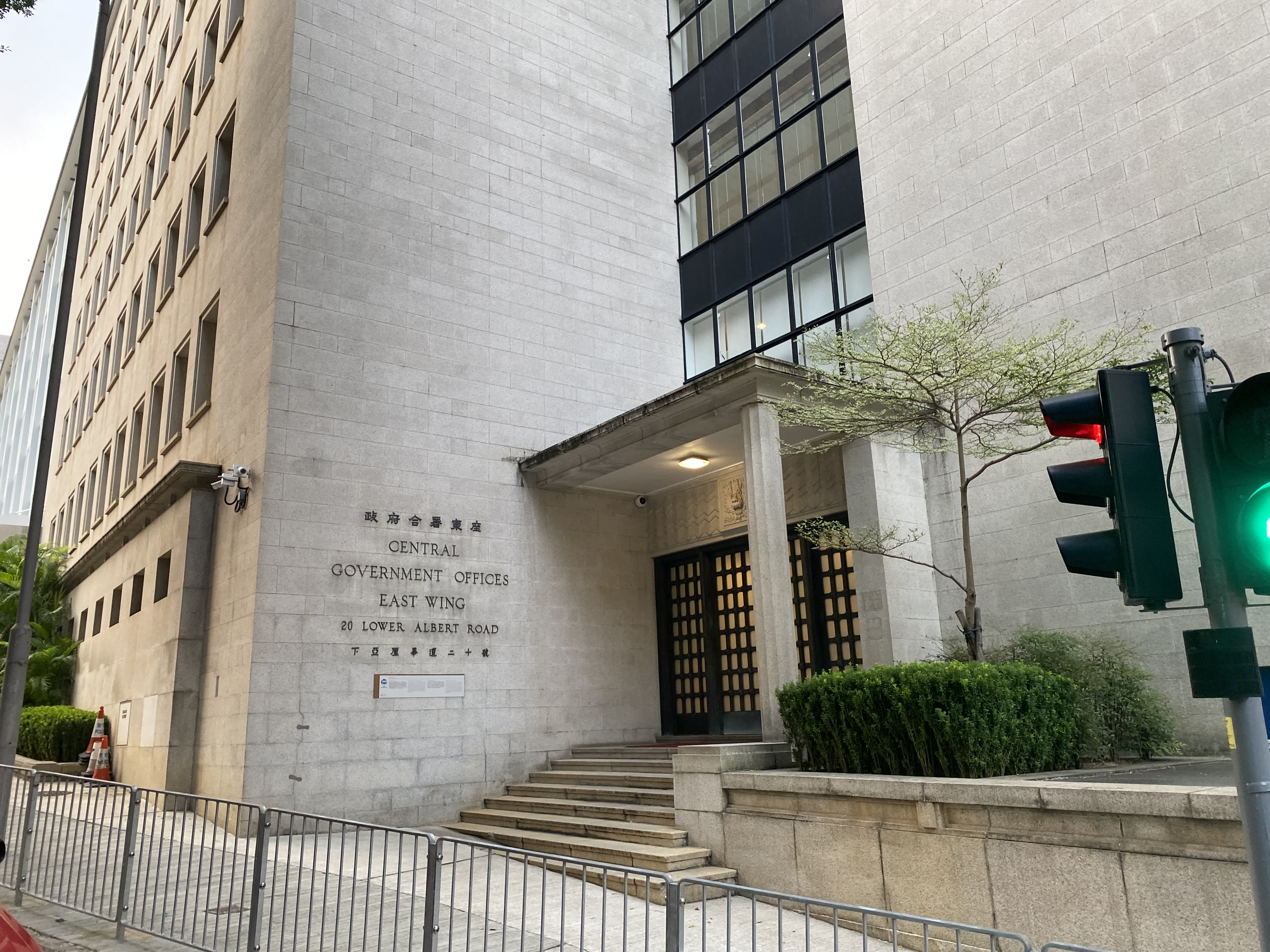
Justice Place in 2022.

The department is headquartered in the former Central Government Offices, which is a Grade I historic building. Now known as Justice Place, the Justice Department relocated to the premises in phases in 2015 and 2018, as part of a plan to preserve the buildings, which were originally slated for demolition and redevelopment in the early 2010s.

Before the relocation, the department's offices were scattered across the Queensway Government Offices and other buildings.

== See also ==
- Judiciary of Hong Kong
