= Calvert (name) =

Calvert is a given name and a surname of English, Scottish and Northern Irish origin.

== People with the first name Calvert ==
- Calvert DeForest (1921–2007), American actor and comedian
- Calvert L. Willey (1920–1994), American food technology association administrator
- Calvert Magruder (1893–1968), Judge of the United States Court of Appeals for the First Circuit
- Calvert Watkins, American professor emeritus of linguistics and the classics
- Calvert Vaux (1824–1895), English-American architect and landscape designer

== People with the middle name Calvert ==
- Henry Calvert Simons (20th century), American economist
- James Calvert Spence (1892–1954), English paediatrician
- John Calvert Griffiths, British lawyer and judge, Attorney General of Hong Kong 1979–1983
- Thomas Calvert McClary (1909–1972), American writer

== People with the surname Calvert ==
- Alan Calvert (1875-1944), American businessman, weightlifting advocate, and author
- Albert Frederick Calvert (1872–1946), English author and adventurer, leader of the Calvert Expedition in Australia
- Alexander Calvert (born 1990), Canadian actor
- Arthur Richard Calvert (1852–1922) English architect
- Ashton Calvert (1945–2007), senior Australian public servant
- Barbara Calvert, (1926–2015), British barrister
- Barbara Calvert, (1918–2008), New Zealand professor of education
- Benedict Calvert, 4th Baron Baltimore (1679–1715), British nobleman and politician
- Benedict Leonard Calvert (1700–1732), proprietary governor of Maryland
- Benedict Swingate Calvert (1722–1788), planter, politician and Loyalist in Maryland during the American Revolution
- Bernie Calvert (born 1942), English bassist
- Caroline Calvert (1834–1872), early Australian author and naturalist
- Casey Calvert, American pornographic actress
- Casey Calvert (Hawthorne Heights), musician in the band Hawthorne Heights
- Catherine Calvert (1890–1971), American actress
- Cecil Calvert, 2nd Baron Baltimore (1605–1675), English coloniser
- Cecil Calvert (politician), Unionist politician in Northern Ireland
- Charles Calvert (disambiguation) several people
- Claire Calvert (born 1988), English ballet dancer
- Clay Calvert, professor at the Pennsylvania State University
- David Calvert (born 1946), unionist politician in Northern Ireland
- Eddie Calvert (1922–1978), British trumpet player
- Edward Calvert (architect) (c. 1847 – 1914), Scottish domestic architect
- Edward Calvert (painter) (1799–1883), English printmaker and painter
- E. H. Calvert (1863–1941), American actor and director.
- Frank Calvert (1828–1908), Malta-born English consul and archaeologist
- Frank Calvert (cartoonist) (1876–1920) Seattle newspaperman, cartoonist
- Frederick Calvert (disambiguation), several people
- George Calvert, 1st Baron Baltimore (1579–1632), proprietary governor of Newfoundland and founder of the province of Maryland
- George Henry Calvert (1803–1889), American editor and writer
- George Calvert (bishop) (1900–1976), fourth Bishop of Calgary in the Anglican Church of Canada
- George Calvert (planter) (1768–1838), planter in Maryland
- Giles Calvert (1612–1663), English printer
- Greg Calvert (1937–2005), American psychotherapist and political activist, National Secretary of Students for a Democratic Society
- Hannah Calvert (born 1997), South African water polo player
- Harry Calvert (1763–1826), British general
- Herbert Hepburn Calvert (1870–1923), painter of Australian bird life
- James Calvert (divine) (1631–1698), English Nonconformist divine
- James Calvert (missionary) (1813–1892), British Wesleyan Methodist missionary, active in Fiji
- James Calvert (explorer) (1825–1884), British explorer and botanist, active in colonial Australia
- James F. Calvert, American captain of the first submarine to surface at the North Pole
- John Calvert (disambiguation), several people
- Kate Calvert, birth name of poet Kae Tempest
- Ken Calvert (born 1953), American politician
- Laurence Calvert (1892–1964), English recipient of the Victoria Cross
- Leon Calvert (1927–2018), British jazz trumpeter, co-founder of Club Eleven
- Leonard Calvert (1606–1647), first governor of Maryland
- Lorne Calvert (born 1954), Canadian minister and politician, premier of the province of Saskatchewan 2001–2007
- Margaret Calvert (born 1936), British typographer and graphic designer
- Mary R. Calvert (1884-1974), American astronomical computer and astrophotographer
- Matt Calvert (born 1989), Canadian ice hockey player
- Mike Calvert (1913–1998), British soldier
- Nicolson Calvert (died 1793) (c1724–1793), MP for Tewkesbury
- Nicolson Calvert (1764–1841), MP for Hertford 1802–26, and for Hertfordshire 1826–34
- Paul Calvert (disambiguation) several people
- Philip Powell Calvert (1871–1961), American entomologist
- Phill Calvert (born 1958), Australian rock drummer
- Phillip Calvert (governor) (c. 1626 – 1682), fifth governor of Maryland
- Phyllis Calvert (1915–2002), English film, stage and television actress
- Robert Calvert (1945–1988), South African lead singer, poet and frontman of Hawkwind
- Robert S. Calvert (1892–1981), Texas comptroller, 1949–1975
- Robert W. Calvert (1905–1994), Texas politician and judge
- Robert Calvert (saxophonist), English saxophonist
- Roy Calvert (1913–2002), Royal New Zealand Air Force pilot during WWII
- Samuel Calvert, Canadian soldier and politician
- Samuel Calvert (painter) (1828–1913), English engraver and painter active in Australia
- Sherry Calvert (born 1951), American javelin-thrower
- Stephen E. Calvert (born 1935), Canadian professor, geologist, and oceanographer
- Thomas Calvert (divine) (1606–1679), English Nonconformist divine
- Thomas Calvert (professor) (1775–1840), English Anglican priest and theologian
- William Calvert (Australian politician) (1871–1942), Australian politician in Tasmania
- William Calvert (cricketer) (1839–1894), New Zealand cricketer
- William Calvert (MP) (c. 1703 – 1761), Lord Mayor of London 1748–49, MP for Old Sarum 1755–61 and for the City of London 1742–47
- William Samuel Calvert (1859–1930), Canadian politician

== Fictional characters ==
- Joshua Calvert, in Peter F. Hamilton's The Night's Dawn Trilogy

== See also ==
- Dominic Calvert-Lewin, English footballer for Everton
