= Oldbury Farm =

Historic residence in New South Wales, Australia

- Location within New South Wales Location within Australia
- 34.5302°S 150.3088°E
- Location: Oldbury Road, Moss Vale, Wingecarribee Shire, New South Wales, Australia

History
- Built: 1822–1828

New South Wales Heritage Register
- Official name: Oldbury Farm
- Type: state heritage (landscape)
- Designated: 2 April 1999
- Reference no.: 488
- Type: Homestead Complex
- Category: Farming and Grazing

Oldbury Farm is a heritage-listed residence at Oldbury Road, Moss Vale, Wingecarribee Shire, New South Wales, Australia. It was built from 1822 to 1828. It was added to the New South Wales State Heritage Register on 2 April 1999.

== History ==
=== James Atkinson ownership ===
Oldbury was established in 1822 by James Atkinson (1794-1834) on 3000 acres of land granted by Governor Macquarie. From 1822 Atkinson became a beneficiary of convict assignments.

James Atkinson was born in 1794 in Oldbury, Kent and was a farmer. He arrived in NSW in 1820 as a free settler on the "Saracen". The land that would become Oldbury was granted by Macquarie, initially 800 acres, with conflicting sources as to whether it was in 1818 or 1821.

In 1825 Atkinson returned to England and wrote "An Account of the State of Agriculture and Grazing in New South Wales". In his book Atkinson referred to emancipists and the poorer class in the Colony as Dungaree Settlers. The Sydney Gazette took Atkinson to task for being disrespectful to this class of people. Maguire (2002) adds that Atkinson published several papers on agricultural matters between 1826 and 1829 - the best known of which is the one cited above, which was favourably reviewed by English author and polymath publisher, John Claudius Loudon.

Returning to Australia in 1826 he married Charlotte Waring, the governess of Hannibal Macarthur's children, and applied to the Colonial Secretary for more land (1200 acres), which he received, and then proceeded to build Oldbury in 1828. He built the first windmill and evidently started milling flour on his property as well as dairy farming. He was a progressive man and encouraged activities such as ploughing matches. At Oldbury he created a model farm which won widespread admiration. Joseph Shelvey one of Atkinson's assigned convicts won a number of ploughing matches at Oldbury.

In 1827 Atkinson was appointed a magistrate. He and Charles Throsby, another magistrate in the area, supervised the constables, lock-up keeper and clerk servicing their Court in Bong Bong.

Two of Atkinson's best friends were Alexander Berry and Edward Wollstonecraft who were magistrate landowners on the Shoalhaven River. Berry and Wollstonecraft had a large number of assigned convicts. From time to time they requested Atkinson to come down to the Shoalhaven to order punishments for their convicts. Magistrates could not order the punishment of their own convicts.

James Atkinson died in 1834, "a gentleman of considerable literary attainments and as a practical agriculturist second to none in the colony" wrote the Sydney Gazette.

A Robbery at Oldbury

About the 17 August 1829 a robbery took place at Oldbury when its storeroom was broken into. John Champley (a local store keeper) and his assigned servant John Yates with Joseph Shelvey were arrested for the crime. All three were subsequently sentenced to death at Campbelltown. The three were convicted primarily upon the evidence given by Patrick Brady also an assigned servant to James Atkinson. It was subsequently alleged that James Atkinson promised to give Brady a ticket of leave to give evidence at the trial.

Upon appeal by their barrister, Roger Therry, Champley, Yates and Shelvey were reprieved from the gallows. Governor Darling then sent Champley and Shelvey to Norfolk Island and Yates to Moreton Bay. About a year later two captured bushrangers from Jack Donohoe’s gang confessed to the robbery at Oldbury and Governor Bourke had Champley, Yates and Shelvey brought back to Sydney and pardoned.

According to Sir Roger Therry one of the captured bushrangers, William Webber, before his execution, told James Atkinson where he had hidden the goods stolen in the Olbury robbery. He told Atkinson they were under a pile of stones and were still there. If Atkinson did find the stolen goods it would appear he never informed the Government.

Charlotte Atkinson

Surprisingly by 5 February 1835 Charlotte Atkinson declined the erection of a public monument in memory of her late husband that had been proposed by public subscription.

Then on 30 January 1836 Mrs Atkinson and her overseer at Olbury, George Bruce Barton left Oldbury for the purpose of an inspection of some of Mrs Atkinson’s sheep stations at Belanglo. During this time the two were bailed up by armed unidentified bushrangers. The bushrangers gave Barton a severe flogging with a stock whip and threatened to flog Mrs Atkinson although they did not do so. The bushrangers accused Mrs Atkinson of allowing her men to mistreat her assigned convicts. Strangely enough shortly after in March Charlotte married Barton.

An attempt was made to murder Barton on 30 June 1838 at Olbury. Charlotte and Barton were sitting at their parlour window when an unknown assailant fired a gun at Barton. The ball passed through Barton's clothing but did not kill him. Iron gang convicts were suspected of the crime.

Charlotte wrote the first published children's book in Australia: 'A Mother's offering to her children'.

Louisa Atkinson

The youngest daughter of James and Charlotte Caroline Louisa Waring Atkinson (1834-1872) was born just 8 weeks before James died. Always delicate, she spent her youth writing and collecting and drawing animals and botanical specimens near her homes - first at Oldbury and later at "Kurrajong" (Fernhurst) in the Blue Mountains and on the South Coast of NSW. A keen horse rider, she would set out on horseback to gain access to deep gullies and high ridges.

At 23 she published her first novel, Gertrude the Immigrant: a Tale of Colonial Life which was to be followed by five more (some were serialised in the Sydney Mail(1861–72) and regular columns in the Sydney News (1853–55), Sydney Morning Herald and The Sydney Mail (1860–71), where her columns entitled 'A Voice from the Country' were often accompanied by her own sketches. It was as a botanist however that her contributions were most valuable.

She corresponded with the leading botanists of the day, including (making collections of botanical specimens for) The Rev. William Woolls (of Parramatta) and Baron Ferdinand von Mueller (Govt. Botanist of Victoria, Director of the Royal Botanic Gardens, Melbourne), who named a species of mistletoe, Atkinsonia ligustrina after her. Xanthosia atkinsoniana, Erechtites atkinsoniae (now Senecio bipinnatisectus) and the heath Epacris calvertiana also carry her names.

Atkinson was as well as a botanist, a naturalist, artist and author of many books on native flora and fauna.

Louisa Atkinson, her sisters and brother spent their earliest years in this house, garden, farm and surrounds. She became one of Australia's earliest botanical explorers. The first Australian native-born woman novelist (as E. Morris Miller's "Australian Literature" attests), Louisa was one of the earliest women journalists. She was also an artist of technical ability and great verve of expression.

In 1869 Louisa married explorer and naturalist James Calvert (1825–84) who had accompanied Ludwig Leichhardt on his 1844-45 expedition. Always interested in horticulture, he won a medal at the 1862 International Exhibition in London for his entry on the possible commercial cultivation of native flax.

Her regular popular natural history columns in the "Sydney Morning Herald" were re-published by Victor Crittenden in two volumes through his Mulini Press in 1978 as "A Voice from the Country" (the pseudonym Atkinson used for the articles - it was not common for authors to sign their work in those days) and as "Excursions from Berrima and a Trip to Manaro and Molonglo in the 1870s", which was articles about her travels and botanical searches on the Southern Tablelands of NSW.

Louisa's first novels originally appeared as serials in The Sydney Mail and only her first two novels, "Gertrude the Emigrant" and "Cowanda, the Veteran's Grant" were published as books in her lifetime. "Myra", "The Debatable Ground" and 'Tom Hellicar's Children' were re-published by Mulini Press. 'Tom Hellicar's Children' paints a picture of childhood in the Berrima district and recalled her own memories of life at Oldbury. The novel recounts the cruel treatment of three children by their guardian uncle. They are dispossessed of their idealistic home as Louisa was when her father died and the whole family fled from their brutal alcoholic stepfather.

Elizabeth Lawson's book "The Distant Sound of Native Voices" focused on Atkinson's writings on Aboriginals - some of Louisa's earliest published illustrations were of Aboriginal remains near Oldbury. Lawson's 1995 book "The Natural Art of Louisa Atkinson" Louisa's writings and artwork. Louisa was trained in art by her mother Charlotte, who had in turn received lessons from John Glover. Louisa prepared a book of her own artwork for publication, which has never been traced. It was to include the botanical and flower paintings, birds and animals of NSW. Ferdinand von Muller, with whom she had corresponded on botany over the years, had sent the book to Germany to have the illustrations engraved by experts. The book was never published as she died while it was in preparation and it disappeared. It may have been burnt in the great bonfires at Oldbury when the house was sold some years after her death. She died tragically in 1872. She died tragically just 18 days after giving birth to her only child, a daughter, Louise Snowden Calvert.

The avenue of English (European) elms was planted by James Atkinson, his idea being to continue them to Mereworth, as a link to his brother John's property, Mereworth. John's property, Mereworth is situated on the western side of the (present) Hume Highway from Oldbury and the two were connected by an unsealed road (now bisected by the realigned Hume Highway).

=== Post-1834 ===
Following James Atkinson's death in 1834, his executors decided to lease the property and sell the stock, providing his widow an income to allow her to live in Sydney. His widow, son (also James Atkinson) and daughter Louisa later returned to the property. Louisa's marriage to Calvert was held in the sitting room at Oldbury Farm in 1870. James Atkinson junior and then Louisa Atkinson inherited the property in turn.

The roof was altered in form and materials in the 1920s.

It was owned by Montague Nicholson in the 1940s, who referred to the farm as "Swanton".

The house was reportedly untenanted for long periods until its restoration c. 1960s by J. McDonald. The house had a corrugated iron in the 1960s.

In 1983, the house underwent a total restoration by Clive Lucas & Partners, including putting the roof back to its original 1920s form, reshingling the roof, and reconstructing the portico and front steps, based on measured drawings by William Hardy Wilson in the 1910s-20s.

In the 1970s, it was owned by prominent advertising agency figure Elizabeth Dangar, who was married there in 1979.

A program in recent years of rejuvenation, replanting and revival of laid hawthorn hedges on the farm has been implemented. Hedge laying is an old European practice which produces stock-proof farm hedges. A similar program of rejuvenation of the garden has been underway in recent years.

== Description ==
The historic group consists of the Oldbury house, the garden, service yards and outbuildings and the surrounding farming property. The property also contains a swimming pool, tennis court and pavilion.

=== Setting ===
Oldbury Farm is set on a rise at the north-western footslopes of Mt. Gingenbullen, situated at the end of hawthorn-hedge (Crataegus oxycanthaand European elm tree (Ulmus procera)-copse-enclosed road (some Monterey cypress (Cupressus macrocarpa) and some Arizona cypress (Cupressus glabra) flank Oldbury Road.

Surrounding paddocks are edged with hawthorn hedges, many of these re-laid in recent years in the traditional English / European manner, cutting their trunks almost through, laying vertical trunks and branches down horizontally or on an angle, pinning these to vertical stakes and encouraging coppicing shoots from the base, to keep the hedges stock-proof and dense right to the base

Oldbury Creek winds through the property, crossing Oldbury Road which is unsealed. Copses of willow (Salix sp., likely crack willow, Salix × fragilis) line the creek, along with hawthorn seedlings (from former hedges on the property)

The homestead complex is protected by shelter belts of hawthorns and Bhutan cypresses (Cupressus torulosa). Some old and tall Monterey pines (Pinus radiata) to the house's southwest frame the garden and shelter it from westerly winds (strong in this area).

The homestead itself is approached by a single gravel drive, with a large carriage loop directly in front of the house. The drive divides and a rear drive winds around the eastern side of house and garden to a range of outbuildings and service yards and the rear garden and paddocks.

To Oldbury Farm's south-east and slightly uphill on Oldbury Road is Oldbury Cottage, a (at times) separately-held property on Oldbury Road, historically part of the broader Oldbury Farm estate. This comprises a stone cottage and outbuildings, with garden and surrounded by protective Monterey pines and hawthorn hedging.

The homestead complex is surrounded by large exotic trees and lawns.

=== House ===
Oldbury is a simple, two-storey, Colonial, Georgian house which retains its original joinery. The roof has a single pitch with a longer slope at the rear, covering rooms in which the floor level is lower than those in front of the house. At each end of the stone flagged verandah at the rear of the house there is a separate stone building - one previously a kitchen, and the other one a dairy. It has a separate kitchen, eight rooms, a hall, passages, offices and cellar beneath. It is built of stone, with a (non original) timber shingle roof and has a simple, Doric, timber portico. It has small paned casement windows and six panelled doors set in panelled jambs with elaborate architraves. The entrance door is a wide pair of French windows with Georgian glazing. The wide entrance hall with a timber, cantilevered stair, beneath which a door with a semi-circular fanlight leads to the rear of the house, is particularly fine. In the living room, to the left of the hall on entering, is a cedar fireplace of unusual design and good craftsmanship. The cellars are formed by the deep foundations and paved with brick and stone. Its ceilings are lined with lathe and plaster. The house is in good condition.

=== Garden ===
From the gates (modern) a short straight section of drive leads into a large circular carriage loop. A level, approximately semi circular area before the house is raised above the carriage drive and approached from it by stone steps from which a straight central stone flagged path leads to the house.

Old illustrations suggest that this garden before the house was formerly hedged and there is evidence of a gate being set at the top of the steps. The eastern side of this terrace has been roughly stone flagged in recent years.

The garden was sheltered on the west by a border planting of old and tall Monterey pines (Pinus radiata); however, all but one has been removed in recent years. It retains a Himalayan cedar (Cedrus deodara) to the house's southwest. Some older oaks (Quercus sp.) in front and east of the house and old Mediterranean cypress (Cupressus sempervirens) to the house's rear/south.

A modern drive branches off the carriage loop near (south-east of) the house to lead to the garages converted from outbuildings to the house's south-east and replacing the older service drive to the east which was separate to the main drive.

Although the terrace and carriage circle appear to be of mid nineteenth century form, it is possible that they are not contemporary.

One large old Monterey pine to the east of the house and side drive remains. Other younger Monterey pines stand to the house's east. Otherwise, apart from the many old elms on the garden's edges, the road and paddocks, some very old shrubs, such as common lilac (Syringa vulgaris cv.), Cotoneaster sp., fruit trees such as plum (Prunus domestica cv.), apple (Malus sylvestris cv.) at the rear, there is little more old planting.

A range of modern planting has been added since the 1990s including an extent of Leyland cypress (x Cuprocypatis leylandii 'Leighton's Green') hedging to the house's rear, compartmentalising the rear garden and "home paddock".

To the house's south-west are a vegetable garden area and beyond that, a line of Monterey cypress and another of Leyland cypress have been added to on the east by another of sweet gums (Liquidambar styraciflua). The space between the two cypress rows has been converted into a "native walk" or garden, with topiary shaping of native species since April 2013. It is intended to extend this up the slope of Mount Gingenbullen through native corridors in the farm's paddocks.

In particular since c. 2013 a programme of rejuvenation of the garden and farm has been underway. Old flagged paths have been relaid in sandstone. Adjoining areas of farm paddock have been incorporated into the garden as "nature garden", magnolia walk, prairie garden and arboretum (tree collection). The aim is to surround the historic core with parkland lawns and extend towards Oldbury Cottage garden, without disturbing the historic character of Oldbury. Landscape designers Chris and Charlotte Webb advised on design and plant selection to the two gardeners on site.

Under the elms at the front gate and drive thousands of European bluebells (Endymion non-scriptus) have been planted for their blue spring flowers. Benches and a small bridge over the new stream or prairie garden have been added. The latter is planted with perennials and decorative grasses in 2013. This creek flows when there is enough rain to overflow the large farm dam above (south-east of the house).

To the northeast of the dam and house garden a new 5 acre arboretum with a loop walk has been created since 2013, in converted farm paddocks. A pinetum (collection of pine species), native garden, firepit and lookout on the top of the spur to the north-east have been added. At the top end of the loop walk is a new hedge of hawthorn, as part of an ongoing program of farm hawthorn hedge relaying and replanting. At the bottom near the dam is a very old hedge relayed in 2012.

On the western side of the house, broadleaf trees have been planted. On the east side, the Chinese pistachio (Pistacia chinensis) and golden elm (Ulmus x hollandica 'Lutescens'). Hybrid plane trees (Platanus x hybrida) flank the side drive to the house's east.

== Heritage listing ==
Oldbury Farm Group is significant as one of the earliest farms in the area and because of the quality and high degree of intactness of the main homestead. The significance of the site is further enhanced by its large and attractively landscaped grounds – which include numerous mature early 19th century trees – and through its association with James and Caroline Louisa Atkinson.

Oldbury is significant as an early and stylistically rare representative of Colonial Georgian country house (its lack of a verandah making it a reasonable contemporary English Georgian farmhouse). The building's significance is further enhanced by its extensive and attractively landscaped setting with mature 19th century trees, the quality of its original craftsmanship and detailing, its aesthetic integrity and the high degree of intactness of original features and fabric (assisted by careful and appropriate conservation). Oldbury resembles a small English farmhouse, particularly in its setting of English trees which do well in this locality. Its style is unusual in Australia, and it is an interesting example of the good building craftsmanship of the time, in what was in 1828 quite a remote area of settlement (National Trust of Australia (NSW), 1981).

The importance of the garden relies solely on its rare surviving layout - the rare combination of a small, formerly enclosed, "cottage" garden before the house, giving onto an impressively scaled carriage circle.

The use of small enclosed gardens before homesteads appears to have been quite common once but few are now intact, their boundaries having been extended. Few appear to have been raised and as carefully formed as that at Oldbury, or formed in conjunction with a carriage loop. A similar raised garden but without a carriage loop survives at Meadowvale, Appin. There is no planting of special interest

Oldbury Farm was listed on the New South Wales State Heritage Register on 2 April 1999.
