= Mary Harriet Bate =

Australian botanist

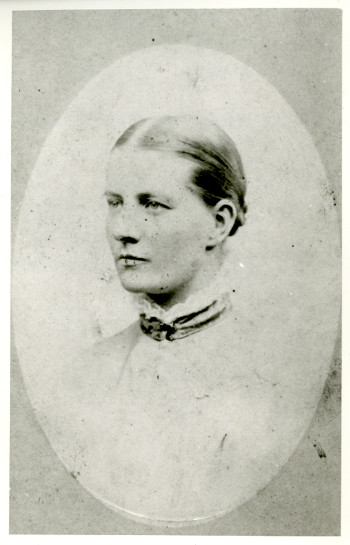
- Mary Harriet Bate
- Born: 1 October 1855; Sydney, Australia
- Died: 29 December 1951 (aged 96); Kyogle, Australia
- Citizenship: Australian
- Scientific career
- Fields: Botanical collector

Mary Harriet Bate (1 October 1855 – 29 December 1951) was an Australian collector of botanical specimens for Australian botanists, especially the German-Australian Ferdinand von Mueller. Her contributions were recognised in the names of several species.

== Biography ==
Mary Harriet Bate was born in Sydney on 1 October 1855 to Henry Jefferson Bate (1816–1892) and Elizabeth Kendall née Mossop (1816–1910). One of nine children, her brother Richard had a son, Henry Bate who was a member of state parliament. From the age of 14 Bate lived on the family property "Mountain View" at Tilba Tilba on the south coast of New South Wales until she married at the age of 30. She married John Vincent Griffiths, a storekeeper at Bombala on 6 September 1886 and they had five children. In 1921 the Griffiths moved to a dairy property at Kyogle. John Griffiths died in 1940 and Mary Griffiths (née Bate) died in 1951 at the age of 96.

== Contributions to science ==
Between the years of 1881 and 1886, Bate collected specimens of flowering plants, algae and fungi between the Tilba coast and Mount Dromedary (now known as Mount Gulaga). The National Herbarium of Victoria, Melbourne Botanic Gardens still retains 361 of her plant specimens and the collection includes the rare shrub Myoporum bateae F.Muell (1882) and the moss Bryum bateae Müll.Hal. (1898) named for her. Also there are the moss Bryum viridulum Müll.Hal. (1898) as well as the basidiomycete Trametes heteromalla Cooke (1882), the alga Sargassum laevigatum J.Agardh (1889) and the tree Eucalyptus bosistoana F.Muell. (1895). All these were type specimens for the respective species which she collected. Her algal specimens were identified by Jacob Agardh, the fungal specimens by Mordecai Cooke and the bryophytes by Carl Müller.

== Relationship with Mueller ==
Bate was only one of Mueller's at least 220 female collectors, although she was one of the more prolific of them. They wrote to each other regularly and he encouraged her by writing "You are one of the very few Ladies in all Australia, who have any taste for botanic science, in contrast to what is observed in all Europe and North America". In naming Myoporum batae eponymously, he wrote to her "I hope this acknowledgment will encourage you to continue your searches as doubtless a whole host of rare plants and some new ones remain there yet to be discovered." Other female collectors had species named after them by Mueller, including Caroline Atkinson (known as Louisa Atkinson) whose name is commemorated in five species and one genus (Atkinsonia).
