= A. excelsa =

A. excelsa may refer to:

- Acacia excelsa, a tree species
- Acropolitis excelsa, a moth of the family Tortricidae
- Araucaria excelsa, commonly known as the Norfolk Island pine, a tree species in the family Araucariaceae
- Alphitonia excelsa, commonly known as the red ash or soap tree, a species of tree in the family Rhamnaceae
- Amanita excelsa, a fungus
- Autographa excelsa, a moth of the family Noctuidae
