= Nicolson Calvert =

Nicolson Calvert may refer to:

- Nicolson Calvert (died 1793) (c1724–1793), MP for Tewkesbury
- Nicolson Calvert (1764–1841), MP for Hertford 1802–26, and for Hertfordshire 1826–34

== See also ==
- Calvert (surname)
