= Charlotte Atkinson =

Charlotte Atkinson may refer to:

- Charlotte Waring Atkinson (1797–1867), author of Australia's earliest known children's book
- Charlotte Atkinson (swimmer) (born 1996), British swimmer
