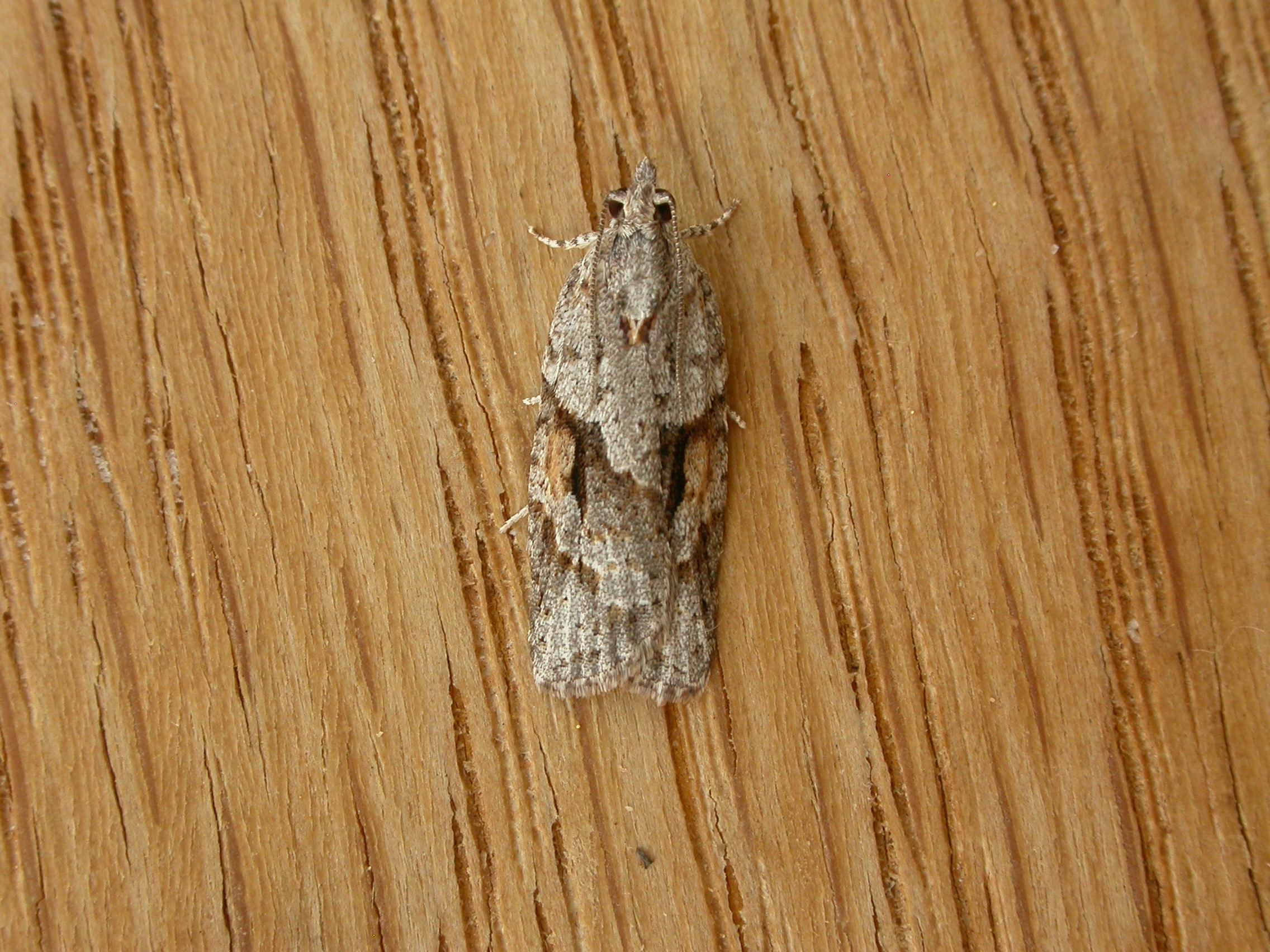

Scientific classification
- Domain: Eukaryota
- Kingdom: Animalia
- Phylum: Arthropoda
- Class: Insecta
- Order: Lepidoptera
- Family: Tortricidae
- Genus: Acropolitis
- Species: A. rudisana

Binomial name
- Acropolitis rudisana (Walker, 1863)

Synonyms
- Sciaphila rudisana (Walker, 1863); Capua eucycla (Turner, 1916); Penthina indecretana (Walker, 1863); Acropolitis rudis (Meyrick, 1910)

= Acropolitis rudisana =

Species of moth

Acropolitis rudisana is a moth of the family Tortricidae. It is widespread in eastern Australia.

The wingspan is about 17 mm. The forewings are grey, with fuscous markings and irrorations (speckles). The hindwings are grey.

The larvae feed on Vitis, Acacia, Arctotheca, Chrysanthemum, Hakea, Helichrysum, Malus, Pinus, Populus, Pyracantha and Rumex species, as well as Dillwynia retorta, Dimocarpus longan, Humulus lupulus, Medicago sativa, Rubus loganobaccus and Trifolium repens.
