= Paul Calvert =

Paul Calvert may refer to:

- Paul Calvert (politician), senator for Tasmania
- Paul Calvert (baseball), Canadian baseball player
- Paul Calvert (whistleblower) exposed ambulance paramedic error cover-ups in Britain
- Paul R. Calvert, American athlete and coach
- Paul T. Calvert, United States Army general
