= Acropolitis hedista =

Scientific classification
- Domain: Eukaryota
- Kingdom: Animalia
- Phylum: Arthropoda
- Class: Insecta
- Order: Lepidoptera
- Family: Tortricidae
- Genus: Acropolitis
- Species: A. hedista

Binomial name
- Acropolitis hedista (Turner, 1916)

Synonyms
- Catamacta hedista (Turner, 1916); Acropolitis lichenica (Turner, 1925)

Species of moth

Acropolitis hedista is a species of moth of the family Tortricidae. It is found in Australia, where it has been recorded from Queensland.

The wingspan is about 20 mm. The forewings are whitish, the costa barred with fuscous. There is a basal patch crossed by lines of greenish-ochreous. The hindwings are grey.
