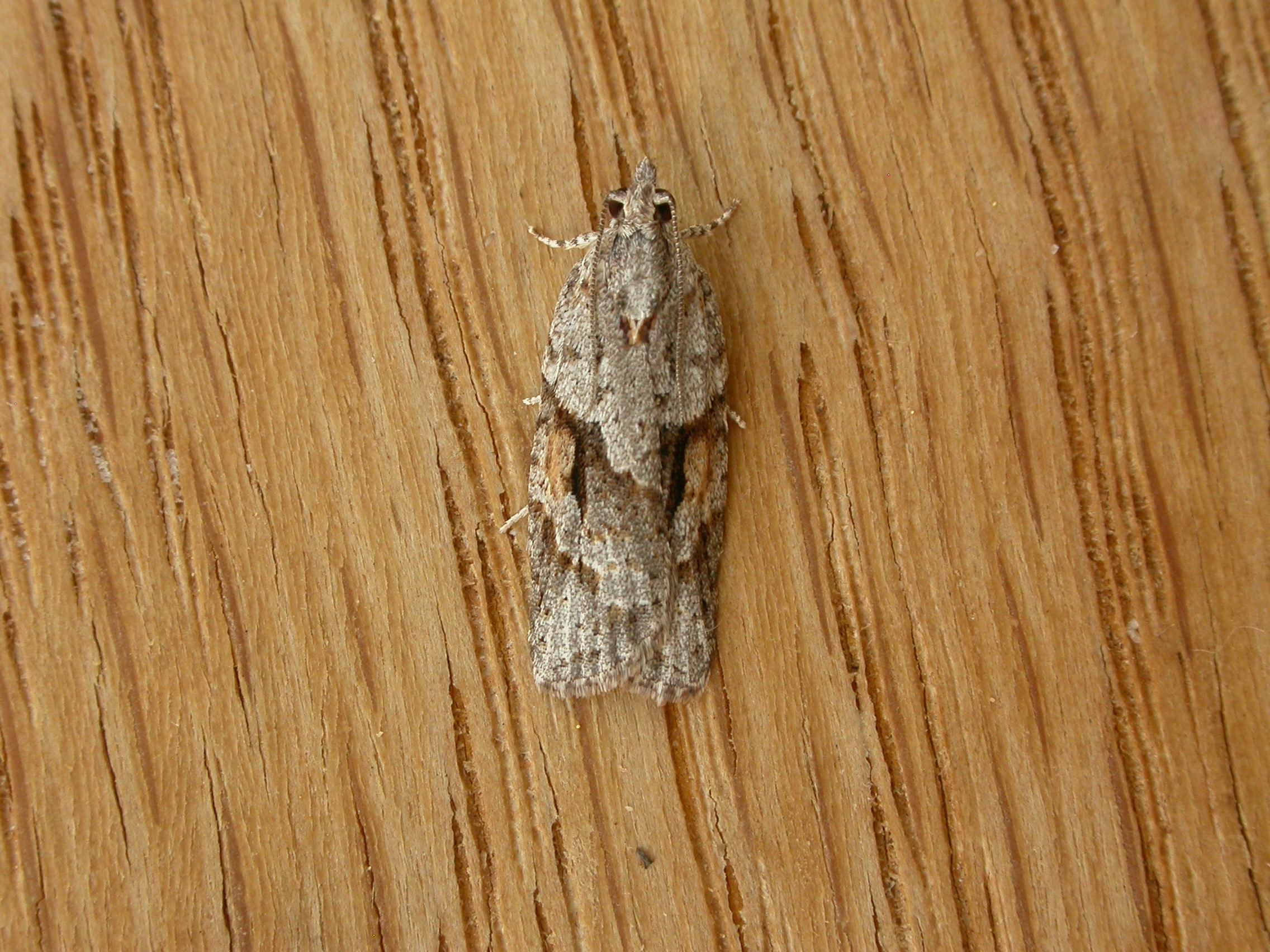
- Acropolitis rudisana

Scientific classification
- Domain: Eukaryota
- Kingdom: Animalia
- Phylum: Arthropoda
- Class: Insecta
- Order: Lepidoptera
- Family: Tortricidae
- Tribe: Archipini
- Genus: Acropolitis (Meyrick, 1881)

= Acropolitis =

Genus of tortrix moths

Acropolitis is a genus of moths belonging to the subfamily Tortricinae of the family Tortricidae.

== Species ==
- Acropolitis canana (Walker, 1863)
- Acropolitis canigerana (Walker, 1863)
- Acropolitis ergophora (Meyrick, 1910)
- Acropolitis excelsa (Meyrick, 1910)
- Acropolitis hedista (Turner, 1916)
- Acropolitis magnana (Walker, 1863)
- Acropolitis malacodes (Meyrick, 1910)
- Acropolitis ptychosema (Turner, 1927)
- Acropolitis rudisana (Walker, 1863)

== See also ==
- List of Tortricidae genera
