= Acropolitis canigerana =

Scientific classification
- Domain: Eukaryota
- Kingdom: Animalia
- Phylum: Arthropoda
- Class: Insecta
- Order: Lepidoptera
- Family: Tortricidae
- Genus: Acropolitis
- Species: A. canigerana

Binomial name
- Acropolitis canigerana (Walker, 1863)

Synonyms
- Teras canigerana (Walker, 1863)

Species of moth

Acropolitis canigerana is a species of moth of the family Tortricidae. It is found in Australia.
