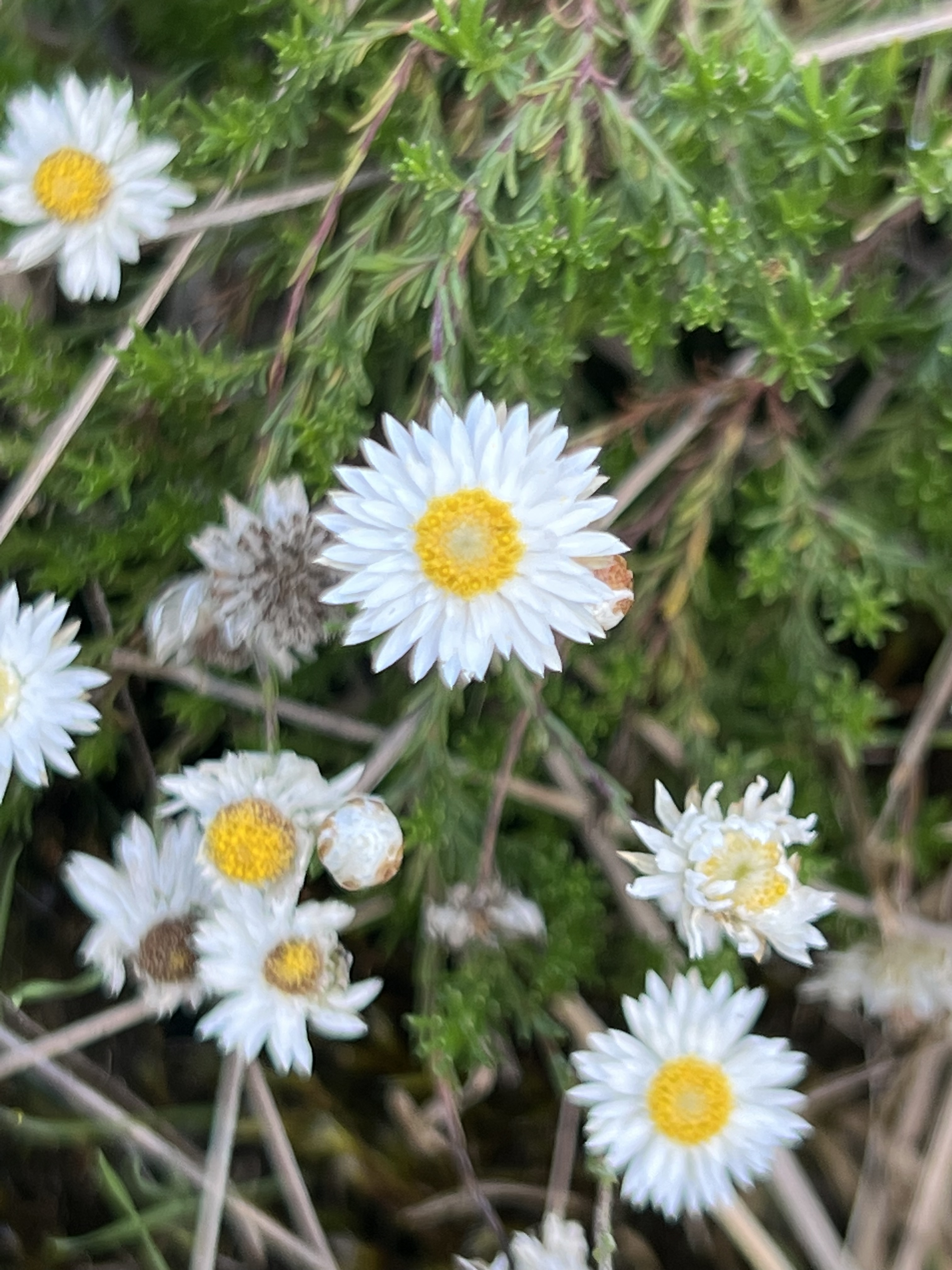

Conservation status
- Vulnerable (EPBC Act)

Scientific classification
- Kingdom: Plantae
- Clade: Tracheophytes
- Clade: Angiosperms
- Clade: Eudicots
- Clade: Asterids
- Order: Asterales
- Family: Asteraceae
- Genus: Helichrysum
- Species: H. calvertianum

Binomial name
- Helichrysum calvertianum (F.Muell) F.Muell.

Synonyms
- Helipterum calvertanium

= Helichrysum calvertianum =

Species of plant

Helichrysum calvertianum, commonly known as Calvert's everlasting is a species of flowering plant in the family Asteraceae which is endemic to the Southern Highlands in New South Wales. It is a small subshrub with small crowded leaves and single white daisy-like flowers.

== Description ==
Helichrysum calvertianum is a small, many branched subshrub to 30 cm (12 in) high with smooth stems and occasional woolly, small glandular hairs. The green crowded leaves are sticky, linear, 3–8 mm (0.12–0.31 in) long, 0.5–0.8 mm (0.020–0.031 in) wide, margins rolled under concealing the lower surface. The papery white, daisy-like flowers are borne singly at the end of wiry branches, 0.7–1 cm (0.28–0.39 in) long and 1–1.5 cm (0.39–0.59 in) in diameter with yellow centres. The bracts are scaly, brownish, somewhat hairy near the base, intermediate bracts longer with pale, papery edges, sometimes tinted pink near the apex, outer bracts golden and translucent, innermost bracts narrow with small, papery white edges. Flowering occurs from January to August and the fruit are a dry, one-seeded, slightly glandular, oblong to needle-shaped, bristly and almost feathery at the tip.

== Taxonomy and naming ==
Helichrysum calvertianum was first formally described 1877 by Ferdinand von Mueller as Helipterum calvertianum and the description was published in Fragmenta Phytographiae Australiae. In 1882 Mueller changed the name to Helichrysum calvertianum. The specific epithet (calvertianum) is in honour of Caroline Louisa Waring Calvert (nee Louisa Atkinson), who collected the holotype specimen near her home south of Berrima.

== Distribution and habitat ==
This species grows mostly on Hawkesbury sandstone in heavier, moist soils, on or near rock platforms and in dry sclerophyll forest. It is restricted to the Southern Highlands between Joadja, Belanglo, Fitzroy Falls and Mount Gibraltar.

== Conservation status ==
Helichrysum calvertianum is listed as "vulnerable" on the Environment Protection and Biodiversity Conservation Act 1999 List of Threatened Flora and the Biodiversity Conservation Act 2016 of New South Wales.
