= Acropolitis ptychosema =

Scientific classification
- Domain: Eukaryota
- Kingdom: Animalia
- Phylum: Arthropoda
- Class: Insecta
- Order: Lepidoptera
- Family: Tortricidae
- Genus: Acropolitis
- Species: A. ptychosema

Binomial name
- Acropolitis ptychosema (Turner, 1927)

Species of moth

Acropolitis ptychosema is a species of moth of the family Tortricidae.

== Distribution ==
It is found in Australia, where it has been recorded from Tasmania.
