= John Calvert =

John Calvert may refer to:

- John Calvert (1726–1804), British politician, MP for Tamworth, Wendover and Hertford
- John Calvert (died 1844) (c. 1758–1844), British politician, MP for Tamworth, Huntingdon, St Albans and Malmesbury
- John Calvert (magician) (1911–2013), American magician
- John Calvert Griffiths, attorney general of Hong Kong
- John Calvert (scholar), American scholar of Islamism at Creighton University
