= Acropolitis canana =

Scientific classification
- Domain: Eukaryota
- Kingdom: Animalia
- Phylum: Arthropoda
- Class: Insecta
- Order: Lepidoptera
- Family: Tortricidae
- Genus: Acropolitis
- Species: A. canana

Binomial name
- Acropolitis canana (Walker, 1863)

Synonyms
- Tortrix canana (Walker, 1863)

Species of moth

Acropolitis canana is a species of moth of the family Tortricidae. It is found in Australia, where it has been recorded from Queensland.
