= Acropolitis magnana =

Scientific classification
- Domain: Eukaryota
- Kingdom: Animalia
- Phylum: Arthropoda
- Class: Insecta
- Order: Lepidoptera
- Family: Tortricidae
- Genus: Acropolitis
- Species: A. magnana

Binomial name
- Acropolitis magnana (Walker, 1863)

Synonyms
- Tortrix magnana (Walker, 1863)

Species of insect

Acropolitis magnana is a species of moth of the family Tortricidae. It is found in Australia, where it has been recorded from New South Wales.
