= Acropolitis malacodes =

Scientific classification
- Domain: Eukaryota
- Kingdom: Animalia
- Phylum: Arthropoda
- Class: Insecta
- Order: Lepidoptera
- Family: Tortricidae
- Genus: Acropolitis
- Species: A. malacodes

Binomial name
- Acropolitis malacodes (Meyrick, 1910)

Species of moth

Acropolitis malacodes is a species of moth of the family Tortricidae. It is found in Australia, where it has been recorded from Western Australia.
