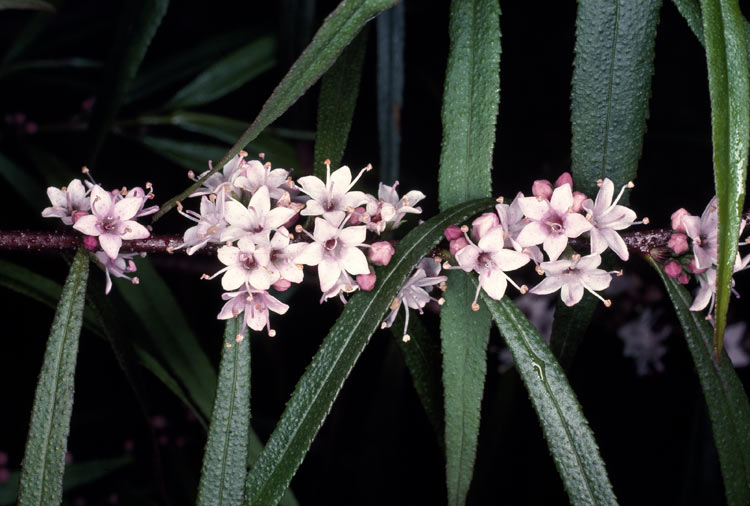

Scientific classification
- Kingdom: Plantae
- Clade: Tracheophytes
- Clade: Angiosperms
- Clade: Eudicots
- Clade: Asterids
- Order: Lamiales
- Family: Scrophulariaceae
- Genus: Myoporum
- Species: M. bateae

Binomial name
- Myoporum bateae F.Muell.

= Myoporum bateae =

Species of flowering plant

Myoporum bateae is a flowering plant in the figwort family Scrophulariaceae and is endemic to the south coast of New South Wales. It is a sweet-smelling glabrous shrub. Although it is sometimes used as an ornamental it is rare in nature, although not endangered at present.

== Description ==
Myoporum bateae is a pyramid-shaped, sweet-smelling shrub to about 5 metres (20 ft) with one to a few straight main stems and slender horizontal branches with a few to many small, wart-like tubercles. The leaves are narrow, 45–150 millimetres (2–6 in) long, thin and soft with toothed edges and dotted with many small oil glands. The foliage is "rather sparse with the leaves elegantly curved downwards from the branchlets". Flowering occurs from September to November when there are clusters of 3 - 10 flowers along the branchlets. The petals are pale purple and although each flower is only about 5.6–6 millimetres (0.2–0.2 in) in diameter, they can be so numerous that the plant "appears to be sprinkled with snow". The fruits are hard and dry (unlike other Myoporum species) and about 2 millimetres (0.08 in) long.

== Taxonomy and naming ==
Myoporum bateae was first formally described in 1881 by Ferdinand von Mueller in Proceedings of the Linnean Society of New South Wales from specimens collected "on rivulets near Mount Dromedary by Miss Mary Bate". Within a few years of describing it, he relegated M. bateae to a synonym of M. floribundum. It is only relatively recently that it was recognised as a separate species again. The two species are closely related but M. bateae can be distinguished by the presence of teeth on the leaf edges (M. floribundum lacks them), the slight pink-purple colour of the leaves (M. floribundum flowers are pure white). M. floribundum leaves are also threadlike and tend to hang vertically.

== Distribution and habitat ==
The species is sporadically distributed on the south coast of New South Wales from the Nepean River to Mount Gulaga. It is mostly found in tall Eucalyptus forest in steep mountain gullies on clay.

== Propagation and cultivation ==
Myoporum bateae can be grown from cuttings which strike within two months. Plants grow best in a cool, moist, semi-shaded position on a rich loam or clay. It is moderately frost resistant and can be pruned to shape.
