= Frederick Calvert =

Frederick Calvert may refer to:

- Frederick Calvert, 6th Baron Baltimore (1731–1771), English nobleman
- Frederick Crace Calvert (1819–1873), English chemist
- Frederick Calvert (MP) (1806–1891), Member of Parliament for Aylesbury, 1850–1851
- Frederick Calvert (footballer), football player
- Frederick Baltimore Calvert (1793–1877), English actor and lecturer on elocution
