= Des Voeux Chambers =

Barristers' chambers in Hong Kong

- Headquarters: 38/F Gloucester Tower, 15 Queen's Road Central, Hong Kong
- Major practice areas: Banking & Finance, Competition Law, Company Law, Insolvency, Intellectual Property, International Trade, Property Law and Trusts, Probate and Succession
- Key people: Co-Heads of Chambers: Winnie Tam SC; William Wong SC

Des Voeux Chambers (Chinese: 德輔大律師事務所) is a set of chambers in Hong Kong. It was founded in 1984 by an amalgamation of a few prominent former members of the Attorney General's Chambers and former law lecturers who had taught at the University of Hong Kong's Faculty of Law.

Des Voeux Chambers is widely known as a leading set of chambers in Hong Kong, alongside Temple Chambers, attributing to more than one-fourth of its barristers having been appointed senior counsel or king's counsel. As of 2025, 26 of its members have been appointed Senior Counsel in Hong Kong and/or King's Counsel in England & Wales — more than a quarter of its 100 practising barristers.

== History ==
The chambers was first headed by Neil Kaplan KC, who was appointed High Court Judge in 1990 and later headed the Construction & Arbitration List of the High Court. He was then succeeded by John Griffiths KC SC, formerly the Attorney General of Hong Kong from 1979 to 1983. He was succeeded by Daniel Fung KC SC, formerly the Solicitor General of Hong Kong from 1994 to 1998.

Leadership later passed to John Scott KC SC, JP, who served as Head of Chambers through the late 2010s and into the early 2020s, a period during which the chambers grew to become the largest set of barristers' chambers in Hong Kong.

In April 2017, the chambers established a Practice Development Department, the first of its kind among Hong Kong barristers' chambers. In 2019, Des Voeux Chambers was shortlisted by the Financial Times Innovative Lawyers APAC Awards in the category "Innovation in the Business of Law: New Business & Service Delivery Models", reportedly the only set of chambers in Asia and Australia to be selected from more than 500 submissions.

Scott was succeeded by Winnie Tam SBS SC JP, who had been called to the Hong Kong Bar in 1984 — the same year the chambers was founded — was appointed Senior Counsel in 2006, and had previously served as Chairman of the Hong Kong Bar Association from January 2015 to January 2017.

On 9 July 2025, the members elected Tam and William Wong SC as Co-Heads of Chambers, with the chambers by then comprising approximately 100 practising barristers, of whom 26 had been appointed Senior Counsel in Hong Kong and/or King's Counsel in England and Wales.
