= Acropolitis ergophora =

Scientific classification
- Domain: Eukaryota
- Kingdom: Animalia
- Phylum: Arthropoda
- Class: Insecta
- Order: Lepidoptera
- Family: Tortricidae
- Genus: Acropolitis
- Species: A. ergophora

Binomial name
- Acropolitis ergophora (Meyrick, 1910)

Species of moth

Acropolitis ergophora is a species of moth of the family Tortricidae. It is found in Australia, where it has been recorded from Tasmania.
