= John William Dixon Hobley =

Attorney General of Hong Kong

John Hobley

Attorney General of Hong Kong
- In office 1973–1979
- Preceded by: Sir Denys Tudor Emil Roberts
- Succeeded by: John Calvert Griffiths

Personal details
- Born: 11 June 1929 Southport, Lancashire
- Died: 4 March 1993 (aged 63) England
- Education: University of Liverpool

John William Dixon Hobley CMG QC (11 June 1929 – 4 March 1993) was a British lawyer to was Attorney General of Bermuda in 1972 and Attorney General of Hong Kong from 1973 to 1979.

== Early life ==
Hobley was born in Southport, Lancashire, England in 1929. He was the son of John Wilson Hobley and Ethel Anne Hobley.

He was educated at the University School, Southport, and the University of Liverpool where he obtained a Bachelor of Laws with Honours. He was called to the bar of Gray's Inn in 1950 and practiced on the Northern Circuit until 1953.

== Career in Hong Kong and Bermuda ==
Hobley moved to Hong Kong in 1953 and was appointed a Crown Counsel. In 1962 he was promoted to Senior Crown Counsel and in 1965 to Principal Crown Counsel.

In 1972 he was appointed Attorney General of Bermuda. He returned to Hong Kong one year later to take up the position of Solicitor General. He was almost immediately promoted to Attorney General, in the same year as Denys Roberts was promoted to Colonial Secretary. He served as Attorney General until 1979 when he retired. He was succeeded by John Griffiths QC.

Hobley was appointed CMG in the 1976 Birthday Honours.

From 1985 to 1991, he served as the Principal Legal Adviser to the Wigan Borough Council.

== Personal life ==
Hobley married Dorothy Cockhill on 17 October 1953. They had a son, Jonathan, and a daughter, Margaret.

Hobley died on 4 March 1993.

Legal offices
Preceded by Denys Roberts	Attorney General of Hong Kong; 1973–1979	Succeeded by John Calvert Griffiths
