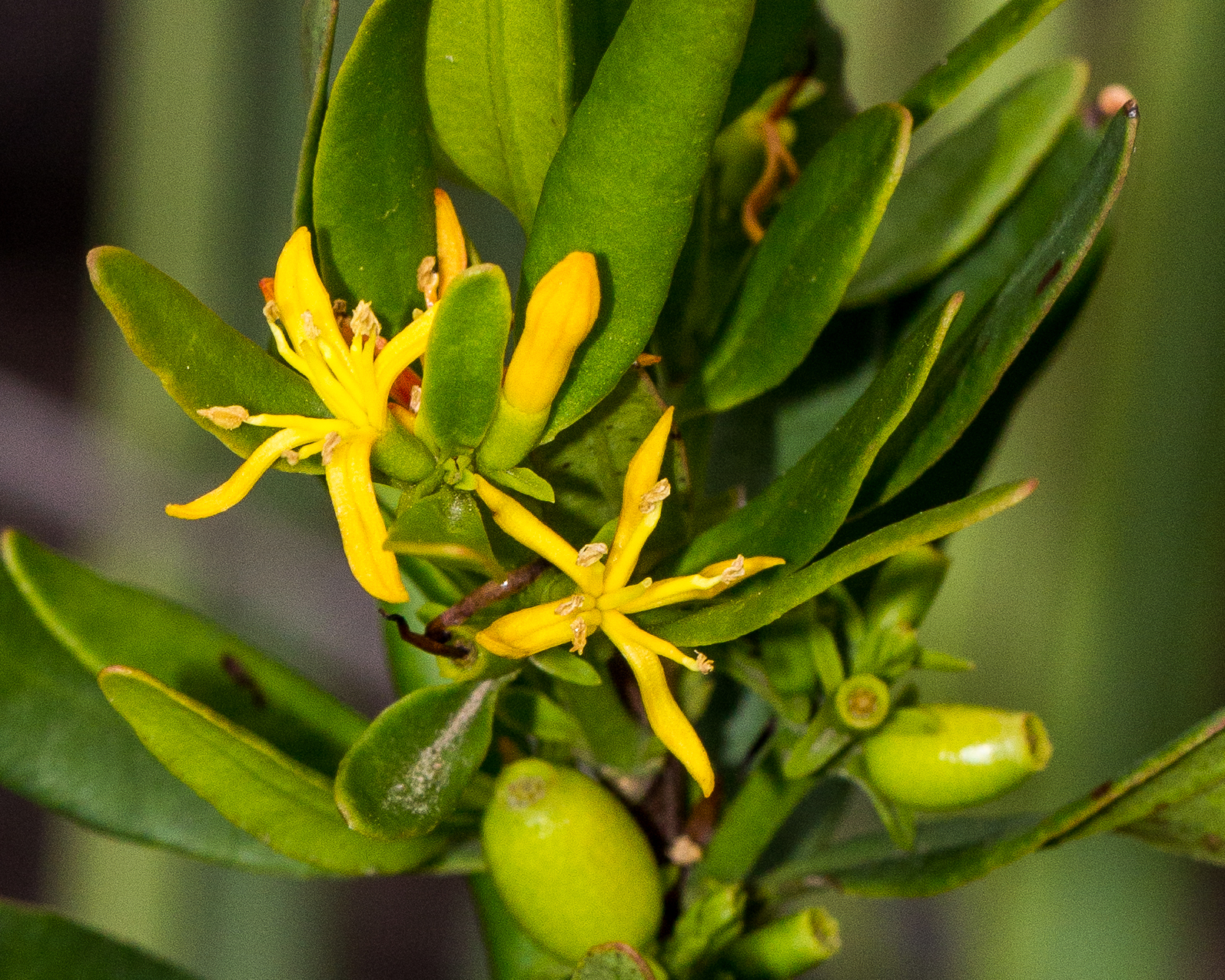
- A. ligustrina: fruit & flowers

Scientific classification
- Kingdom: Plantae
- Clade: Tracheophytes
- Clade: Angiosperms
- Clade: Eudicots
- Order: Santalales
- Family: Loranthaceae
- Genus: Atkinsonia; F.Muell.
- Species: A. ligustrina

Binomial name
- Atkinsonia ligustrina (Lindl.) F.Muell.

Synonyms
- Nuytsia ligustrina; Gaiadendron ligustrina; Loranthus atkinsonae

= Atkinsonia =

Genus of mistletoes

Atkinsonia is a hemi-parasitic shrub with oppositely set, entire leaves and yellowish, later rusty-red colored flowers, that is found in Eastern Australia. It is a monotypic genus, the only species being Atkinsonia ligustrina, and is assigned to the showy mistletoe family, Loranthaceae. It is sometimes called Louisa's mistletoe.

== Description ==
Atkinsonia ligustrina is a stout upright evergreen shrub of 1–2 m high, that parasitises on the roots of other woody plants, but photosynthesises for itself. It has twenty-four chromosomes (2n=24).

=== Roots ===
The primary roots are long-lived, fleshy, bear many scars, and turn blue when damaged. Secondary roots bearing the taproots (or haustoria) are short-lived and devoid of root hairs.

=== Stems and branches ===
There are numerous red–brown branches that split into smooth branchlets that break easily.

=== Leaves ===
The leaves are oppositely set along the branches, but sometimes apparently randomly positioned if some leaves have fallen, are slightly fleshy, spread out, initially bright green and later somewhat more dull green 2–5 cm long, ½–1 cm wide, the downward facing surface felty, an entire margin that has an identical curve from the tapering foot, that ends in an approximately 2 mm long leaf stalk, and a blunt tip at the other side.

=== Flowers ===
The up to eight sweetly scented flowers in each inflorescence are set in racemes in the axils of the leaves, and are almost the same length as the leaves themselves, and appear in November. Each flower has a short stalk, and is subtended by a pair of bracteoles close to the flower, and a third bract further down. The mostly six (sometimes up to eight) petals are spreading narrow strips of approximately 7 mm long, yellow in color, later becoming more rusty red. The anthers are short, pale yellow, and are merged to the petal at the foot.

=== Fruits ===
The drupe-like oval to egg-shaped fruit of about 1½ cm long, is initially green, but develops a red skin when ripe in about March. It hides a thin sticky layer around the seed. The fruits are eaten or shed before the following season's flowerbuds occur.

== Taxonomy ==
Allan Cunningham discovered this species in 1817 and called it Nuytsia ligustrina. This name was published by Lindley in 1839, but not accompanied by the required description. Ferdinand von Mueller described the plant in 1861, thus finally providing the plant with a name. When he was able to see the fruits, he decided the species should be in a new genus, Atkinsonia, and he made the new combination Atkinsonia ligustrina in 1865. Later, in 1883, G. Bentham and J.D. Hooker assigned A. ligustrina to Loranthus, but since Loranthus ligustrina (now Helixanthera ligustrina) had already been used by Nathaniel Wallich in 1824 for another species from India, a new combination, Loranthus atkinsonae, was created. Adolf Engler first included this species in Gaiadendron in 1894, to subsequently distinguish the subgenera Atkinsonia and Eugaiadendron in 1897 based on the morphology of the inflorescences, and eventually in cooperation with Ernst Hans Ludwig Krause restoring both genera to their original circumscription in 1939.

=== Etymology ===
The genus, Atkinsonia, was named for Louisa Atkinson, a plant collector, who found many new plants in the Blue Mountains, including the specimen of A. ligustrina that Cunningham based his description on. The specific epithet, ligustrina, derives from "Ligustrum", a genus in the family Oleaceae, and the Latin, "-ina", a suffix indicating resemblance. Thus the epithet means resembling Ligustrum.

== Distribution ==
Louisa's mistletoe is confined to a small area in the Blue Mountains inland from Sydney, approximately between Linden, Mount Wilson and Mount Victoria, and around Marrangaroo.

== Habitat ==
The species occurs in woodland and heathland growing in exposed sites, and on rocky ridges.

== Ecology ==
A specimen can often be simultaneously parasitic on the roots of many nearby plants. Taproots have been found connecting with the root system of Acacia intertexta, a Caustis species, Dillwynia ericifolia, Eucalyptus piperita, Leptospermum attenuatum, Monotoca scoparia and Platysace linearifolia.

A. ligustrina's small, open, perfumed flowers are insect-pollinated, and the drupe-like fruit has a thin sticky layer on the seed. Seedlings can grow substantially without making contact with a host.
