= Charlotte Waring Atkinson =

Australian writer (1796–1867)

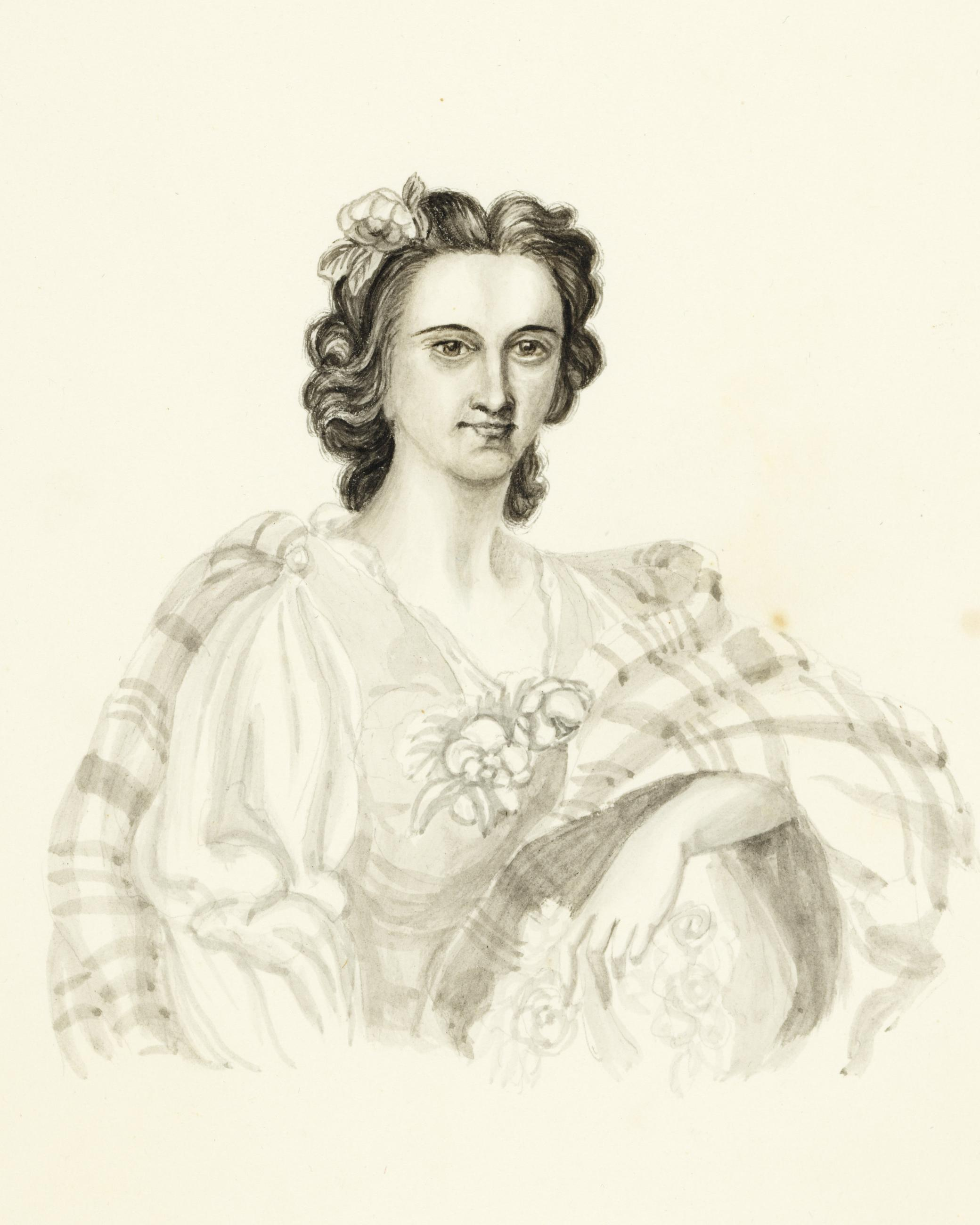
- Portrait attributed to her daughter, C. E. Atkinson, c. 1842 – c. 1846
- Born: Charlotte Waring; 1796; Marylebone, London, England
- Died: 10 October 1867 (aged 70–71); Oldbury, New South Wales, Australia
- Occupation: Author
- Years active: c. 1841
- Known for: Author of Australia's earliest known children's book
- Notable work: A Mother's Offering to her Children (1841)
- Spouses: James Atkinson (m. 1827; died 1834) George Bruce Barton (m. 1836)
- Children: 4, including Louisa

Charlotte Atkinson (née Waring; 1796 – 10 October 1867) was the author of Australia's earliest known children's book. It was titled A Mother's Offering to her Children: By a Lady, Long Resident in New South Wales, and was published in 1841 in The Sydney Gazette.

Anonymously published, the book was originally attributed to Lady J.J. Gordon Bremer, the wife of Sir Gordon Bremer. However, extensive research by Marcie Muir supports its attribution to Charlotte Barton.

== Early life ==
Charlotte Waring was born in 1796 and christened on 13 March 1796 at St Mary's, Marylebone, London. Her parents were Albert Waring and his wife Elizabeth Turner.

== Life in Australia ==
In 1826 Charlotte Waring came to New South Wales to take up a position as governess to the family of Hannibal Hawkins Macarthur. She became engaged during the voyage to James Atkinson, a highly respected agriculturalist and author of the first substantial book on Australian farming. They married in 1827. The couple settled at Atkinson's property Oldbury in the Southern Highlands of New South Wales. They had four children, including the author and naturalist Caroline Louisa Waring Calvert (née Atkinson). The children appear, slightly disguised, as the four children of the book. Charlotte's father, Thomas Albert Waring, died in 1829. She is mentioned in his will as the wife of James Atkinson in NSW.

James Atkinson died in 1834, and Charlotte married Oldbury's overseer George Bruce Barton in March 1836. He became insane and Charlotte was forced to separate from him. Barton had a history of alcoholism and violence, and was eventually convicted of manslaughter in Bathurst in 1854.

Charlotte left Oldbury with her children bound for Budgong and later moved to Sydney. Her guardianship of her children was resoundingly confirmed as of 6 July 1841 in a decision by C.J. Dowling of the Supreme Court of New South Wales.

It being made manifest, therefore, that Mrs. Barton is herself competent to educate her children either by herself or by any competent assistance under her own eye, it would require a state of urgent circumstances to induce the Court to deprive them (all of whom are under thirteen years of age) of that maternal care and tenderness, which none but a mother can bestow.

After winning legal custody of her children, Charlotte returned to Oldbury, where she died in 1867.

== A Mother's Offering ==
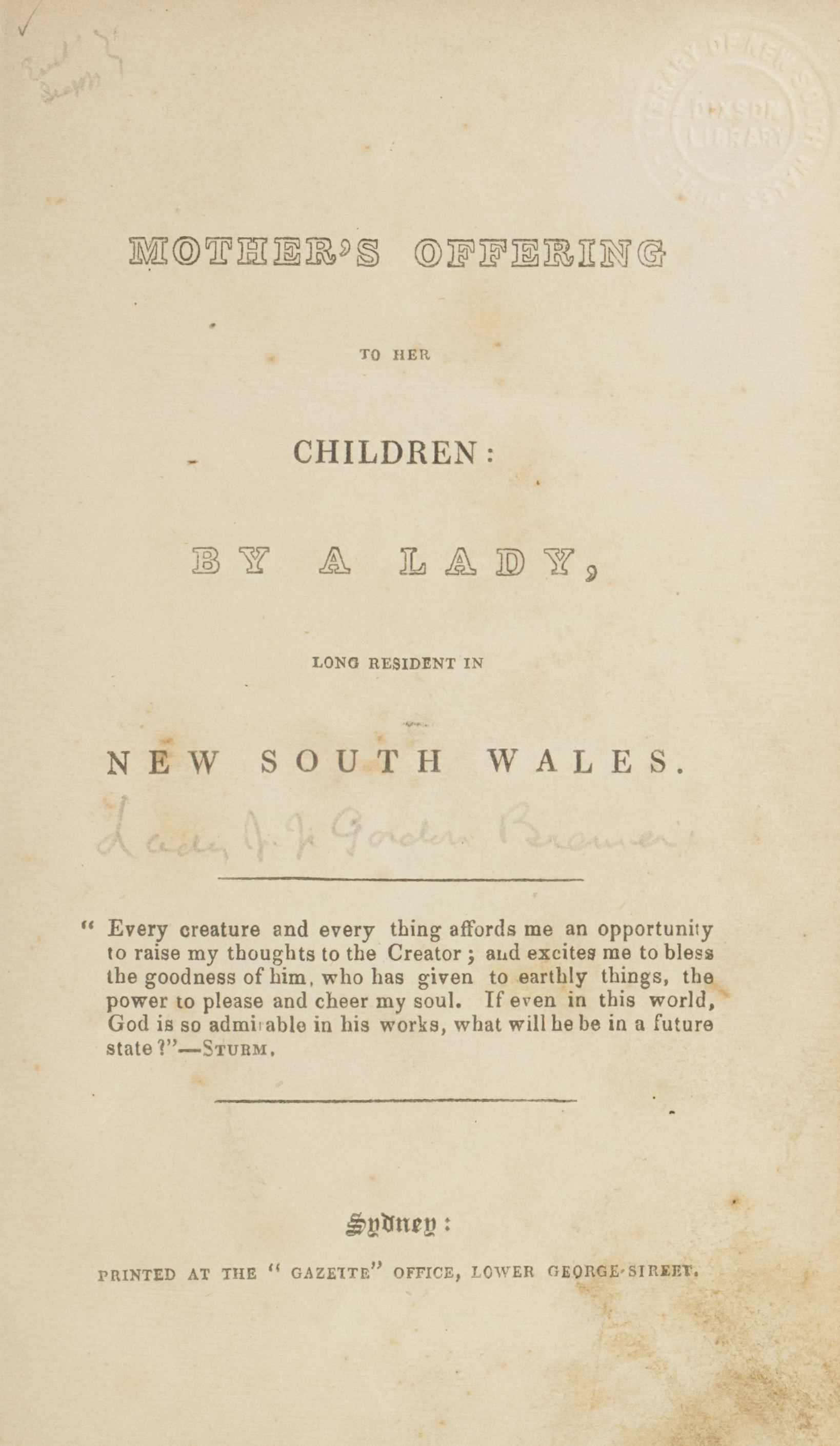
Frontispiece to A mother's offering... by Charlotte Barton, 1841

A Mother's Offering, which predates subsequent Australian literature for the young by a decade, is written in the genre of children's conversation textbooks, a dialogue between mother and children. Atkinson aims to convey the importance of family conversation to education in the home in the nineteenth century, following the pattern of literature by Jean-Jacques Rousseau, such as Emile, or On Education, in its expository question-and-answer format concluding in pious moralising. Charlotte drew on her own experiences in the colony, and probably on actual conversations with her children, in preparing a stimulating, often exciting text that presents children with local adventures and Australian heroes for the first time. It is an example of the influence women had on the community through the education of their children, though the children's questions and reactions are gendered; Clara being interested in botany and Julius in hunting.

The book covers a variety of topics, from natural history, often as an example for human morality, to geology, shipwrecks and the customs of the Australian Aborigines. Some parts are quite lurid, such as her description of the wreck of the Charles Eaton, a ship that went down in the Torres Strait in 1834. It was claimed that many children survived the shipwreck only to be eaten by cannibals. She describes Aboriginal 'monsters' and their 'wanton barbarities' in her A Mother's Offering account of shipwrecked Eliza Fraser's treatment, which she explains is a result of Islanders and aborigines being more prone to 'unrestrained passions' than the British. Life's dangers were a frequent theme of 19th-century Australian children's fiction. And yet there is scientific understanding evident in her accounting for explosions heard in the bush 'as loud as cannon' with reference to theories of Sir John Herschel.

The book was published by George William Evans (1780–1852), a surveyor who had arrived in Port Jackson in 1802. He led the expedition which crossed the Great Dividing Range in 1813. He returned to England in 1826 but came back to Australia in 1832 and set up as a bookseller and stationer.

Most of the work of the Atkinson family is in the State Library of NSW, where many pages are attributed to not one author, but "Atkinson family". A Mother's Offering contains a direct source for the known work, dated, and observation that aided in modern understanding of a life in colonial Australia.

=== As a collector's item ===
The book is very rare and it commands high prices; in April 2005 a copy fetched $48,000. In July 2011 another auctioned by Treloars sold for $25,000.
