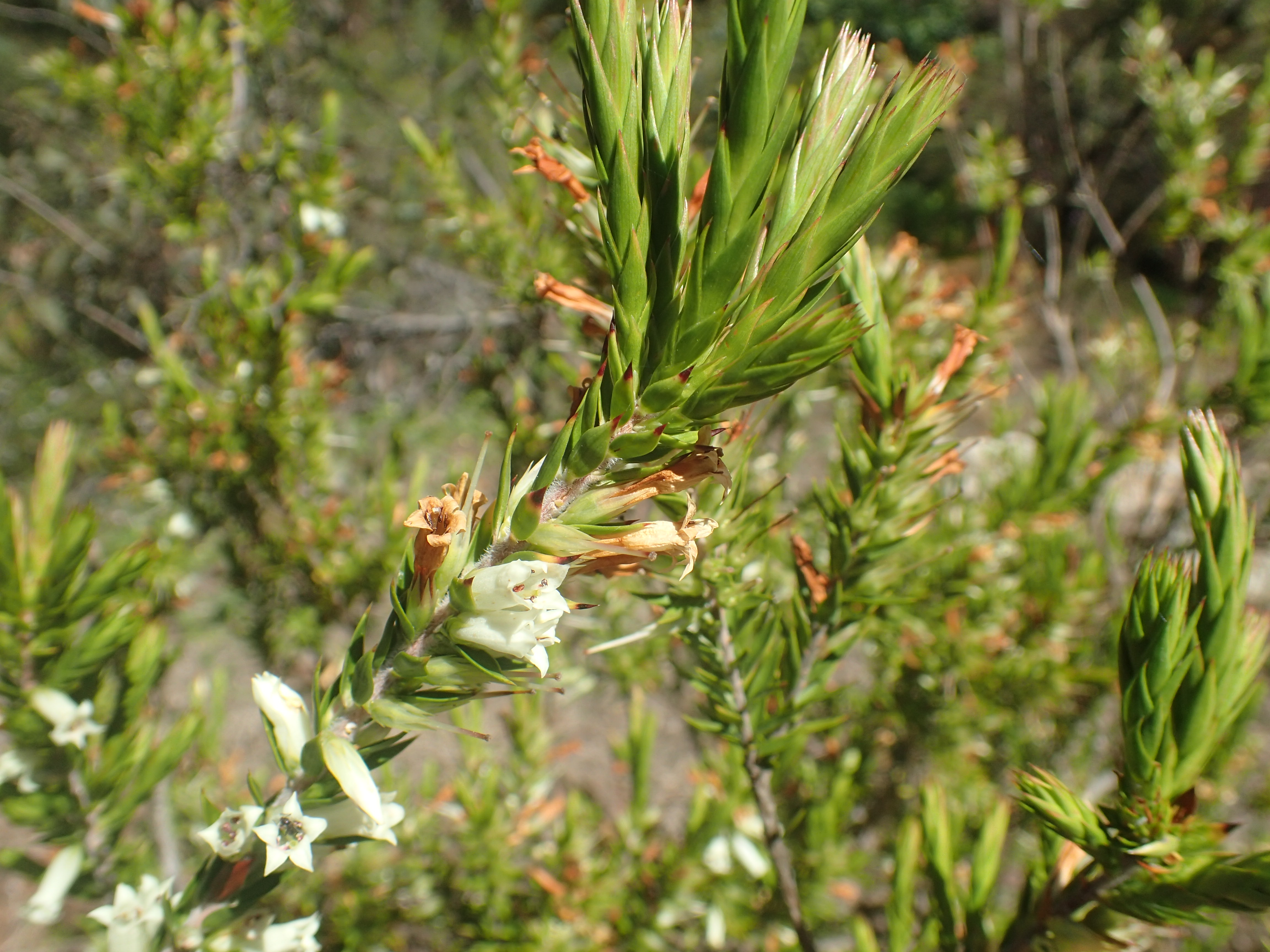
- Epacris calvertiana growing in the ANBG

Scientific classification
- Kingdom: Plantae
- Clade: Tracheophytes
- Clade: Angiosperms
- Clade: Eudicots
- Clade: Asterids
- Order: Ericales
- Family: Ericaceae
- Genus: Epacris
- Species: E. calvertiana

Binomial name
- Epacris calvertiana F.Muell.

= Epacris calvertiana =

Species of flowering plant

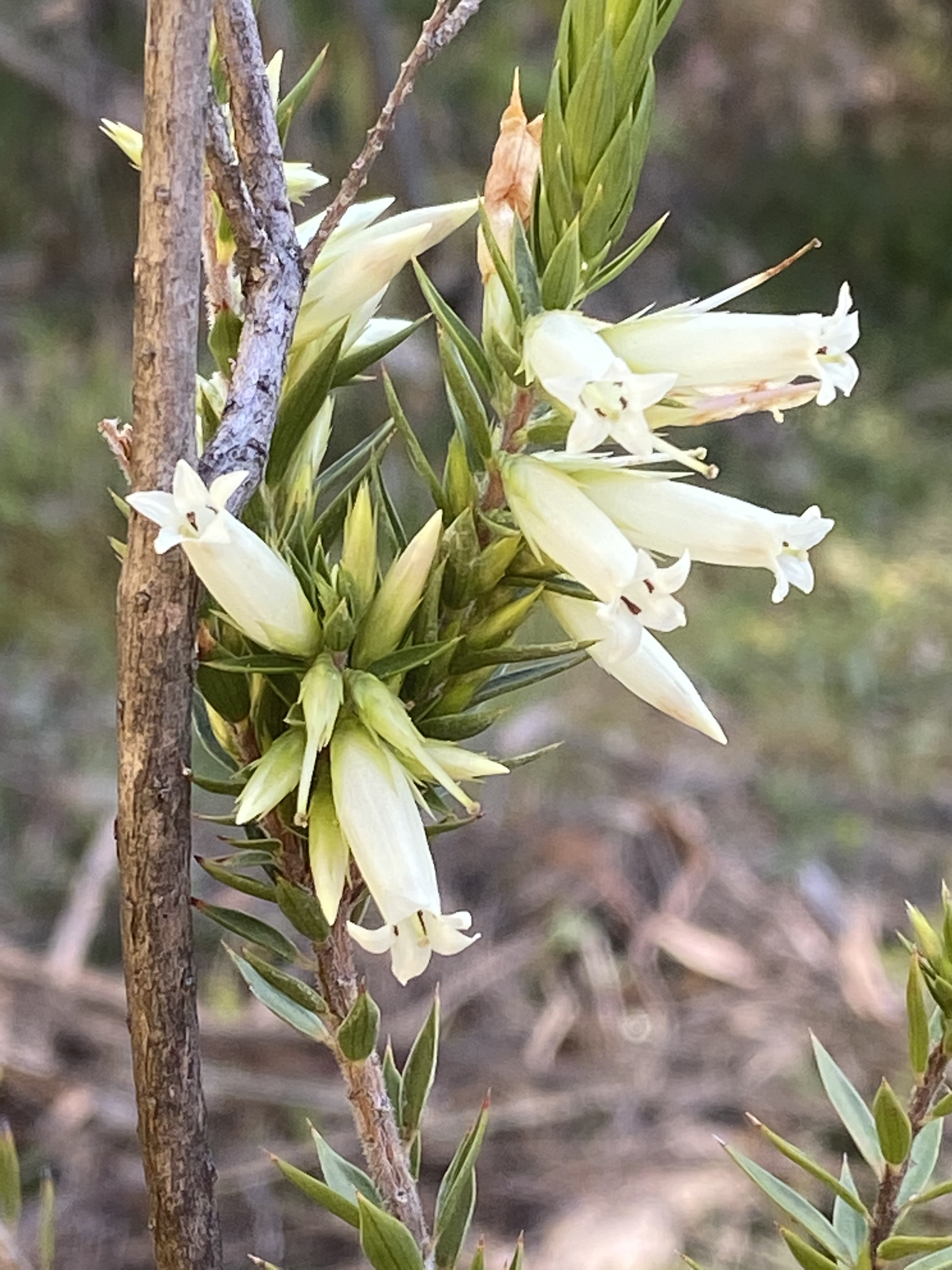
Flowers and foliage

Epacris calvertiana is a plant of the heath family, Ericaceae and is endemic to New South Wales. It is an erect to diffuse shrub with elliptic to egg-shaped leaves with a sharp-pointed tip and with white, pink or red flowers arranged along the ends of leafy branchlets.

== Description ==
Epacris calvertiana is an erect to diffuse shrub that usually grows to a height of 0.2–1.0 m (0.7–3 ft) and has woolly-hairy branchlets. The leaves are elliptical to egg-shaped 5.6–14.3 mm (0.2–0.6 in) long and about 1.3–3 mm (0.05–0.1 in) wide on a petiole 0.9–1.4 mm (0.035–0.055 in) long with a tapering tip. The flowers are arranged along leafy branches on peduncles 1–2.5 mm (0.039–0.098 in) wide, the flowers 3–7 mm (0.12–0.28 in) in diameter. The five sepals are 6–10 mm (0.24–0.39 in) long and the petals are joined to form a white tube, 10–16 mm (0.39–0.63 in) long, sometimes pink or red, and with five lobes 3.8–5.5 mm (0.15–0.22 in) long on the end. The five stamens and the single style are enclosed in the petal tube.

== Taxonomy and naming ==
Epacris calvertiana was first formally described in 1873 by Ferdinand von Mueller and the description was published in the journal, Fragmenta phytographiae Australiae. The specific epithet (calvertiana) honours Louisa Atkinson, (under her married name of Louisa Calvert) who collected the type specimen.

Two varieties are accepted by the Australian Plant Census:

- Epacris calvertiana var. calvertiana has flowers usually 3–4 mm (0.12–0.16 in) in diameter and white, cream-coloured or creamy green flowers;
- Epacris calvertiana var. versicolor has flowers usually 5–7 mm (0.20–0.28 in) in diameter and pink to red flowers with white or cream-coloured lobes.

== Distribution and habitat ==
Drumstick heath mainly occurs along the coast and tablelands of New South Wales from Pigeon House Mountain to the Comboyne Plateau and inland as far as Berrima. It grows on cliffs and in rocky places in forest, including rainforest, from sea level to an altitude of 1,000 m (3,300 ft).
