= Charles Calvert =

Charles Calvert may refer to:

- Charles Calvert, 3rd Baron Baltimore (1637–1715), Proprietary Governor of the province of Maryland
- Charles Calvert, 5th Baron Baltimore (1699–1751), Proprietary Governor of the province of Maryland
- Charles Benedict Calvert (1808–1864), U.S. Congressman from the sixth district of Maryland
- Charles Baltimore Calvert (1848–1906), Maryland Representative
- Charles Calvert (MP) (1768–1832), English brewer and Member of Parliament
- Charles Calvert (painter) (1785–1852), English landscape painter
- Charles Alexander Calvert (1828–1879), actor and theatre manager
- Charles Calvert (governor) (1688–1734), Governor of Maryland, 1720–1727
- Charles Calvert (director), British film director
- Charles Calvert (Cambridge University cricketer) (1825–1882), English cricketer
- Charles Calvert (cricketer, born 1833) (1833–1905), English cricketer
- Chuck Calvert (1930s–2023), member of the Ohio House of Representatives
