= Jacob Richard Clarke =

Music publisher and bookseller (1822–1893)

J R Clarke
- Born: Jacob Richard Clarke; 1822; Taunton, Somerset, England
- Died: 12 July 1893 (aged 70–71); Woolloomooloo, Sydney, Australia
- Notable work: Australian Musical Albums; Sydney and Environs stereo-photographs
- Spouse(s): Louisa Hughes & Emma Jones, 1862
- Parents: John Clark (father); Mary Joggett (mother)

Jacob Richard Clarke (1822-1893) was a leading bookseller and music publisher in Sydney in the second half of the nineteenth century.

== Biography ==
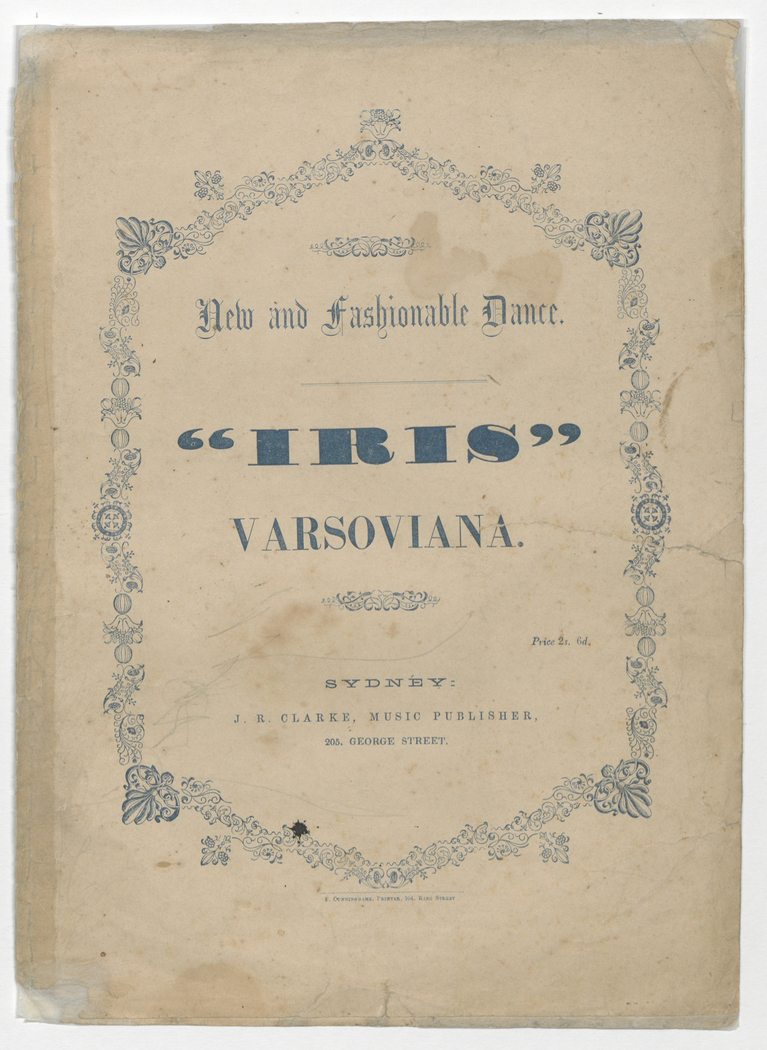
Iris varsoviana, 1857-1864, sheet music printed by J. R. Clarke

Born in England in 1822, Clarke studied church architecture in Taunton, Somerset. He left England in his twenties and after living for a time in New Zealand he settled in Sydney around 1853. Over the next 40 years Clarke established himself as a leading bookseller, stationer and music publisher in Sydney. In his early years in Sydney he was associated with William Prout Woolcott and together they published pieces of music written in the Colony, especially the work of the pianists Boulanger and Henry Marah. This partnership was dissolved in 1856 by mutual agreement.

In the same year Clarke published a series of six lithographic views of Sydney by F C Terry and titled "Australian Keepsake.” In 1858 he published Richard Rowe, aka Peter Possum's Portfolio, dedicated to Nicol Stenhouse and in 1859 published some of the first outdoor photographs of Sydney, compiled by the photographer William Hetzer. Clarke's ‘Australian Musical Albums’, published in 1857 and 1863, emphasised his technical skills and he was one of the first Australian publishers to produce music with coloured illustrations as frontispieces. His patrons included Sir Alfred Stephen and Bishop Alfred Barry.

In the 1850s and 1860s Clark's ‘Music Hall’ was the resort of many of the musical and dramatic artists of the day and among those who frequented his establishment were Lucy Escott, Catherine Hayes, Madame Anna Bishop, Marie Carandini, Rosalie Durand, brothers Lyster, Rosalie Durand, GV brookes.

Clarke's successful business was run from an establishment on Hunter Street. However, in 1864 Clarke ran into trouble with the law and pleaded guilty to three indictments for forgery and was sentenced to four years at Darlinghurst gaol. Upon his release Clarke appears to have gone back into business and between 1869 and 1873 he advertised himself as book print and music seller, depot for photographs at 23 Hunter Street Sydney. By 1875 he had premises at 317 George Street but in 1879 he over-stocked his shop with photographs in anticipation of demand from the opening of the Sydney International Exhibition. By May 1880 lack of sales saw him bankrupted and a second insolvency in 1885 ruined him completely.

For a time he was employed as a low-level Government employee and moved his art-repository to Pitt Street near Bridge Street, Sydney. When he died in Woolloomooloo on 12 July 1893, his second wife Emma was forced to sell some of his papers to pay for the funeral. Clarke had five sons and two daughters by his first wife Louisa Hughes. After she died he married Emma Jones (Widow of Captain W S Jones), née Gater, on 10 April 1862. She survived him with four sons and two daughters. Emma died in 1929.

One of his sons, John William Richard Clarke, followed his father into the bookselling business. His bookseller, stationer and music publishing business was run from shops 5 and 6 at the Sydney Market building in George Street. He also appears to have had a keen interest in the protection of native animals, birds and trees.

== Publications ==
- J. R. Clarke letters from notable citizens and visitors; with typescript explanatory note by C. H. Bertie and J. R. Clarke's obituary notice, 1856-1893 State Library of New South Wales A 2381
- Sydney University, 1869–1873, by Walter Chaffer, published by JR Clarke, book print and music seller, depot for photographs, 23 Hunter Street Sydney, SPF/456
- Poems and songs, by Henry Kendall, Sydney : J. R. Clarke; London : Sampson Low, Son, and Marston 1862, State Library of New South Wales DSM/A821/K
- Map of the portion of North Eastern Australia, comprehending the districts of Moreton bay & Port Curtis and especially indicating the goldfields, J.R. Clarke Publisher, 1858, State Library of New South Wales Z/MC 842/1858/1
- Views of Australia and the Fiji Islands, 1860–1877, Published by JR Clarke, J. Paul Getty Museum, 84.XA.1515
- Map of the colonies of New South Wales and Queensland, shewing the post towns, stations & roads. 1860, J.R. Clarke, publisher, Sydney, State Library of New South Wales, DSM/MC 805gmd/1860/1
- Berncastle, Julius. The Revolt of the Bengal Sepoys / by Dr. Berncastle. J. R. Clarke, 1857, State Library of New South Wales DSM/042/P245
- "Iris" varsoviana [music] : new and fashionable dance. Sydney : J. R. Clarke, between 1857 and 1864, State Library of New South Wales MUSIC FILE/IRI
- Trovatore. Ai nostri monti. Vocal score. English and Italian, Giuseppe Verdi, arranged for voice and piano by L. H. Lavenu, State Library of New South Wales online MUSIC FILE/VER
- Home sweet home, as sung by Miss Catherine Hayes, music by Henry R. Bishop, words by J. H. Payne, Sydney : J. R. Clarke, 185-, F. Cunninghame, printer, State Library of New South Wales MUSIC FILE/BIS
- Unidentified auxiliary steam and sailing ship, between 1860 and 1880, published by J. R. Clarke, carte de visite, State Library of New South Wales SHIPS FILE/56
- Unidentified Clipper Ship, published by J. R. Clarke, 1860, State Library of New South Wales SHIPS FILE/55
