= Louisa Atkinson =

Australian writer and artist (1834–1872)

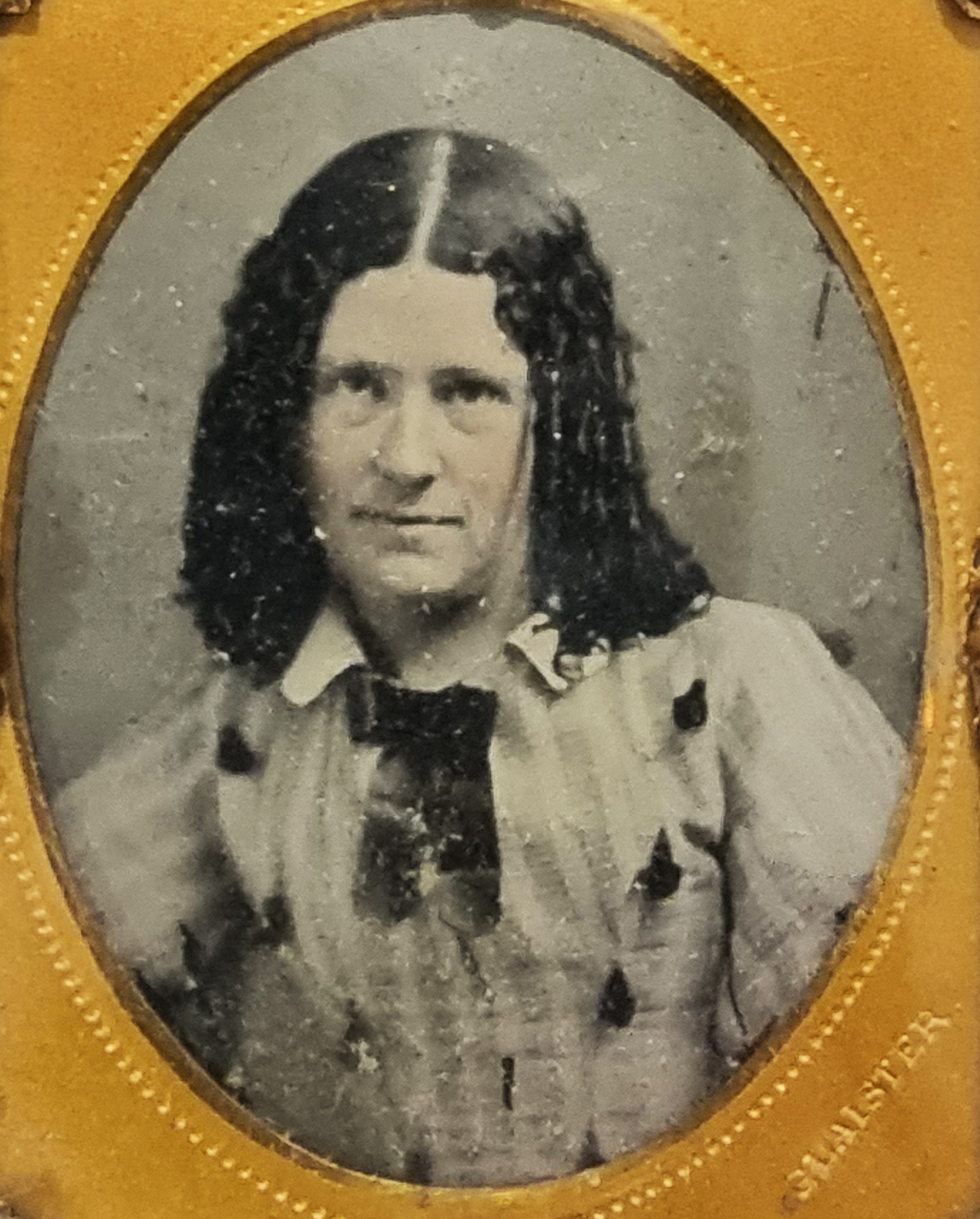
- Atkinson, c. 1865
- Born: Caroline Louisa Waring Atkinson; 25 February 1834; Berrima, New South Wales
- Died: 28 April 1872 (aged 38); Berrima, New South Wales
- Occupations: Writer; botanist; illustrator
- Years active: 1853–1872
- Spouse: James Snowden Calvert
- Children: 1
- Mother: Charlotte Waring Atkinson

Caroline Louisa Waring Calvert (née Atkinson; 25 February 1834 – 28 April 1872) was an Australian writer, botanist and illustrator. Born near Berrima, New South Wales, in 1834, she grew up on rural properties and developed an interest in botany and natural history. By the age of nineteen she had begun to publish illustrated newspaper columns on the Australian natural landscape. She was a keen amateur botanist, collecting specimens of native plants from across the Blue Mountains region to send to scientists, as well as producing a large body of illustrations of native plants and animals. Atkinson published six novels and a number of short stories, largely set in the Australian bush.

Atkinson died in 1872 at the age of 38 shortly after giving birth to a daughter. She has been described as the first Australian-born woman novelist, and is recognised for her contributions to the study of native Australian flora and fauna. Multiple species, including the genus Atkinsonia, are named after her. Her writing has been noted for its promotion of environmental conservation and its sympathetic portrayals of Indigenous Australians.

== Early life ==
Louisa Atkinson was born Caroline Louisa Waring Atkinson on 25 February 1834 near Berrima, New South Wales, at her family's property Oldbury. Her parents were the successful farmer and author James Atkinson and his wife Charlotte (née Waring), the author of Australia's first children's novel. Both had been born in England. Her father died less than two months after her birth. Her mother married the property's superintendent George Bruce Barton soon after. Discovering that Barton was a violent alcoholic, Louisa's mother eventually fled with her children to a cattle station in Budgong. With no income, she moved to Sydney seven months later and petitioned the court for custody of her children and a portion of her deceased husband James' estate. The legal case eventually stretched over six years and consumed much of her husband's estate, before Charlotte was eventually awarded custody of her children.

Louisa did not receive a formal schooling and was educated largely by her mother. While her elder siblings were sent to private schools in Sydney after her mother was awarded custody, Louisa was in poor health and continued to be educated at home. She suffered from tuberculosis throughout her life, which eventually developed into heart issues. The family returned to Oldbury when Louisa was about twelve and remained there throughout Louisa's teenage years. She developed an interest in geology, botany, and zoology, and spent her days studying native plants and animals.

== Writer and naturalist ==
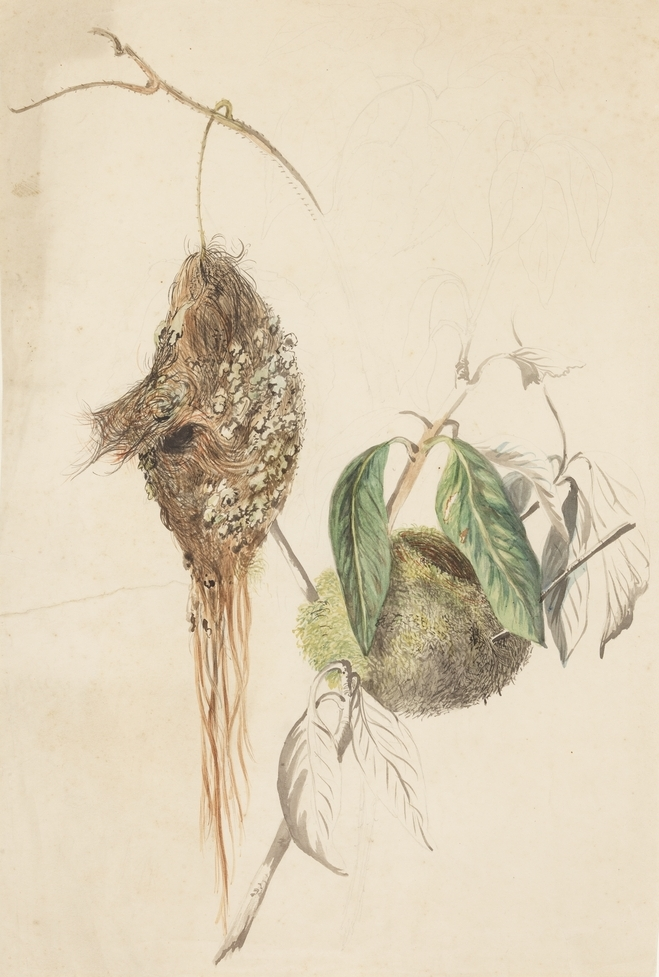
Botanical illustration by Atkinson

By the age of nineteen, Louisa had begun to regularly contribute illustrated articles on natural history to the Illustrated Sydney News. She also wrote short stories and a brief series of articles about Aboriginal Australians titled "The Native Arts". She used her writing as a source of income; while she began to earn a small income from her father's estate in 1855, there was barely enough remaining to support the family's three daughters. The Illustrated Sydney News ceased publication after less than two years in 1855, after which she sporadically wrote for The Australian Band of Hope Journal.

Atkinson published her first novel, Gertrude the Emigrant, under the pseudonym "An Australian Lady" in 1857. The novel was published in a series of 24 eight-page instalments, each of which was sold for three pence. It was positively reviewed, with The Sydney Morning Herald writing that Atkinson had skilfully depicted the "ordinary incidents of everyday occurrence in town and country". Gertrude the Emigrant was published as an illustrated book later that year by Jacob Richard Clarke.

Around 1858, Atkinson and her mother moved to Kurrajong Heights. Atkinson published her next novel, Cowanda, the Veteran's Grant: An Australian Story, the following year. The novel, which was set on a property near their new home, was published by Clarke and featured a cover illustrated by the artist S. T. Gill. In Kurrajong Heights, Atkinson began to spend more time collecting and studying native animals and plants, and would ride her horse across the district to collect specimens. In 1860, she became a regular contributor to The Sydney Morning Herald and The Sydney Mail, writing a popular column titled "A Voice from the Country". She became a well-known amateur naturalist among experts amidst an influx of interest in the newly discovered Australian natural landscape from scientists both in Australia and overseas.

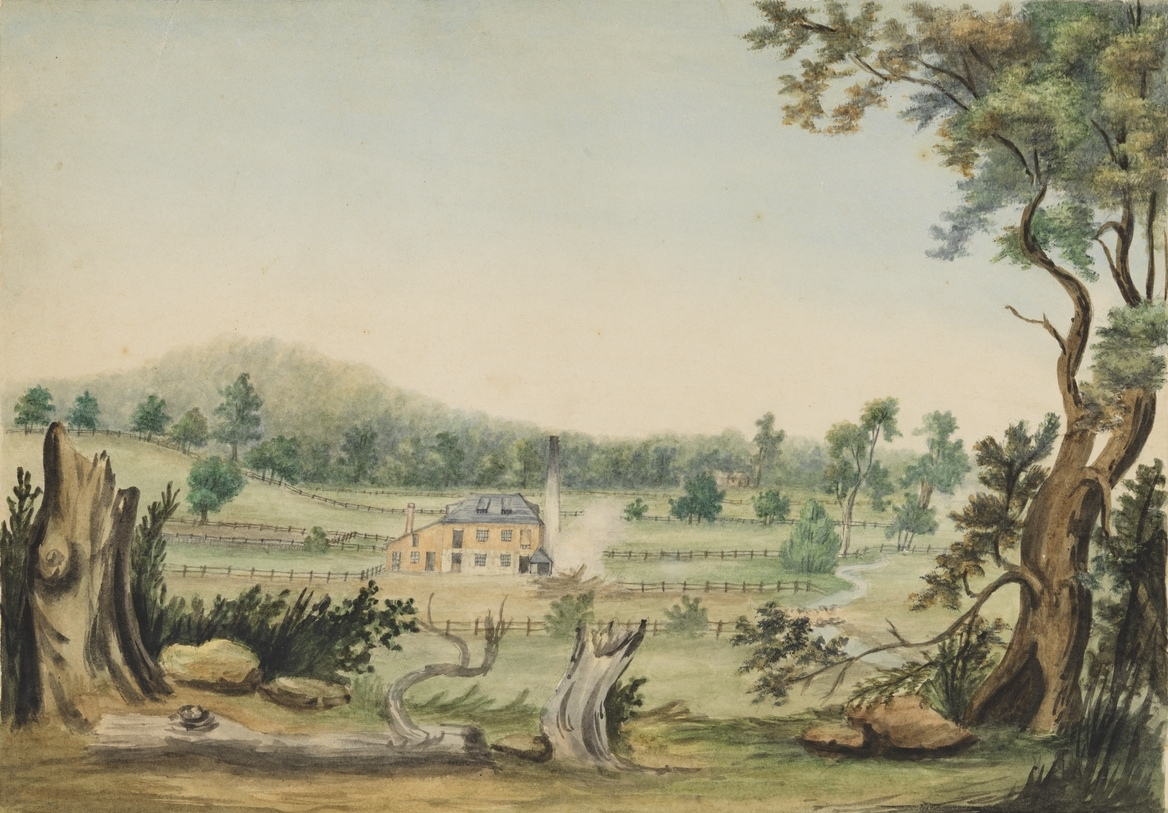
Illustration of Oldbury by Louisa Atkinson

In the early 1860s, Atkinson met the fellow plant collector William Woolls, who introduced her to scientists including Ferdinand von Mueller, William Sharp Macleay, and William Branwhite Clarke. She developed a regular correspondence and friendship with them. She published a series of articles on the culinary uses of native plants and the ferns of her district in the Horticultural Magazine in 1864. During her time in Kurrajong Heights, Atkinson also became active in the community, teaching a home Sunday school and volunteering around the district.

In 1861, Atkinson published a serial novel, Debatable Ground, in weekly instalments in the Sydney Mail over the course of five months. Her next novel, Myra, appeared weekly in the same publication for two months in early 1864. The novel features characters that the scholar Patricia Clarke describes as an implied lesbian couple: the protagonist's guardians are two women, one of whom is a masculine figure who manages the farm, while the other manages the household.

== Later years and death ==
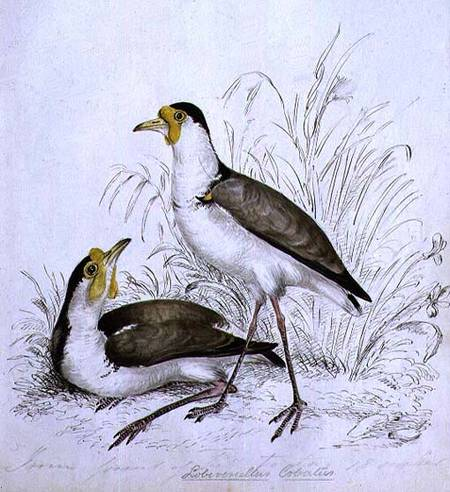
Sandpipers, an illustration by Atkinson

By the mid-1860s, Atkinson's tuberculosis had returned, leading to a sustained decline in her health. She also began caring for her ageing mother after she suffered injuries in a fall, leading the pace of her writing to decline substantially. Louisa and her mother Charlotte returned to Oldbury to live with her brother. After her mother died in 1869, Atkinson married the explorer James Calvert. They briefly lived on his property, Cavan, and then returned to a cottage at Oldbury. In 1871, Atkinson published her next novel, Tom Hellicar's Children, loosely based on her mother's own battle for custody of her children. She also began publishing a new series of articles about plants and natural history in the Sydney Morning Herald and the Sydney Mail. Atkinson wrote her last article, an entry in a new series titled "My First Bush Home, by a Country Housemother", for the Sydney Mail on 10 February 1872.

On 10 April 1872, Atkinson gave birth to a daughter named Louise Snowden Annie Calvert. She died suddenly from a heart attack a few weeks later on 28 April, reportedly after seeing her husband's horse arrive home without its rider. Calvert, who had not been injured in the fall, arrived home soon after to find Louisa dead. Her final novel, Tressa's Resolve, was published posthumously in the Sydney Mail in 1872. It drew on her husband's time exploring remote areas of Queensland during an expedition with Ludwig Leichhardt in the 1840s.

== Writing ==
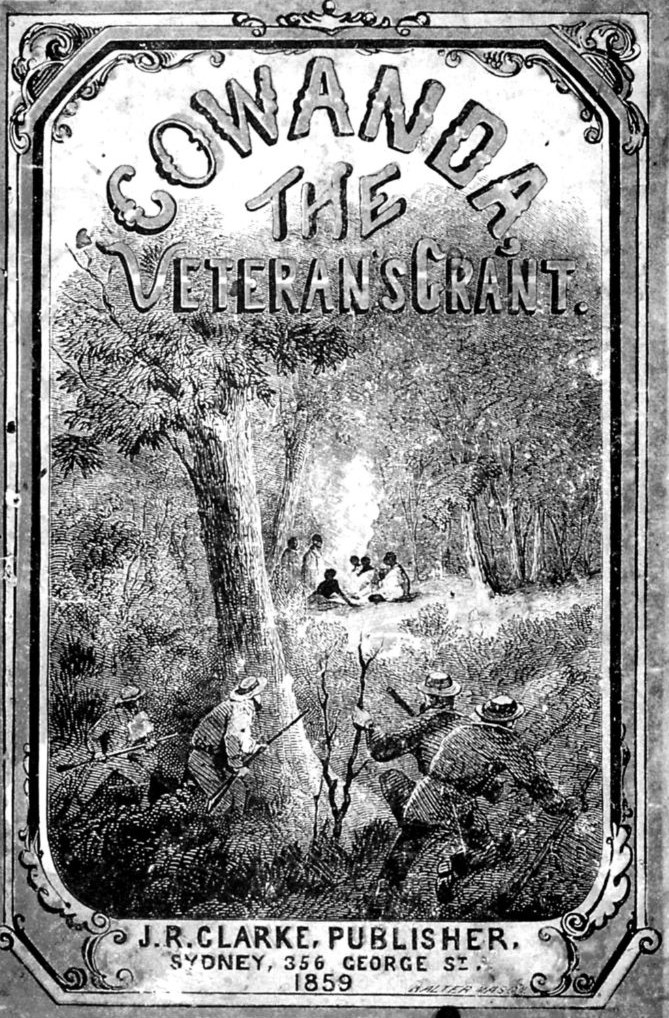
Cover of Atkinson's book Cowanda

Atkinson wrote six novels during her life, and has been described as the first Australian-born woman novelist. Her fiction largely consisted of domestic novels that depict ordinary Australian life across a variety of settings, including the goldfields, pastoral stations, and urban centres. The scholar Elizabeth Lawson writes that Atkinson's novels drew on English traditions of the "Victorian romance-melodrama", combining romantic plots with themes of family fortune and inheritance. Her writing is also characterised by its sentimentality and the use of evangelical and moralising themes. Atkinson's novels were not always well-received; Clarke argues that her first two novels feature underdeveloped characters and poor structure, pointing out that these criticisms were also made by contemporary reviewers. In Clarke's view, these issues were exacerbated in Atkinson's later serialised novels, which feature sprawling storylines and casts of characters but lack coherent plots.

Atkinson's writing often depicts the impact of European colonisation on the Australian natural landscape. She expressed her sadness about deforestation, land clearance, and species decline. Atkinson also criticised farmers who were wasteful or entitled in their usage of natural resources, such as those who killed native animals and did not put their skin or carcasses to good use. She presents connection to the land as connected with religious virtue; the scholar Graham White describes her writing as featuring "hymns of praise to the beauties of nature" and as exploring a spiritual dimension to the Australian landscape.

Scholars have argued that Atkinson's writing presents a unique picture of everyday colonial life in the Australian bush, particularly from a female perspective. Her depictions of Aboriginal Australians have also been highlighted by scholars; Clarke writes that Atkinson's writing also features a notably "sensitive if rather patronising" attitude towards Aboriginal Australians within the context of her era. The scholar Elizabeth Lawson describes Atkinson's novels as humanist works that are "almost free of racial prejudice" and "distinctively feminist". While Atkinson was long recognised for her contributions as a naturalist, her fiction received little attention until the later decades of the 20th century. Five of her novels and two collections of her articles were eventually printed between 1978 and 1998.

== Botany and illustrations ==
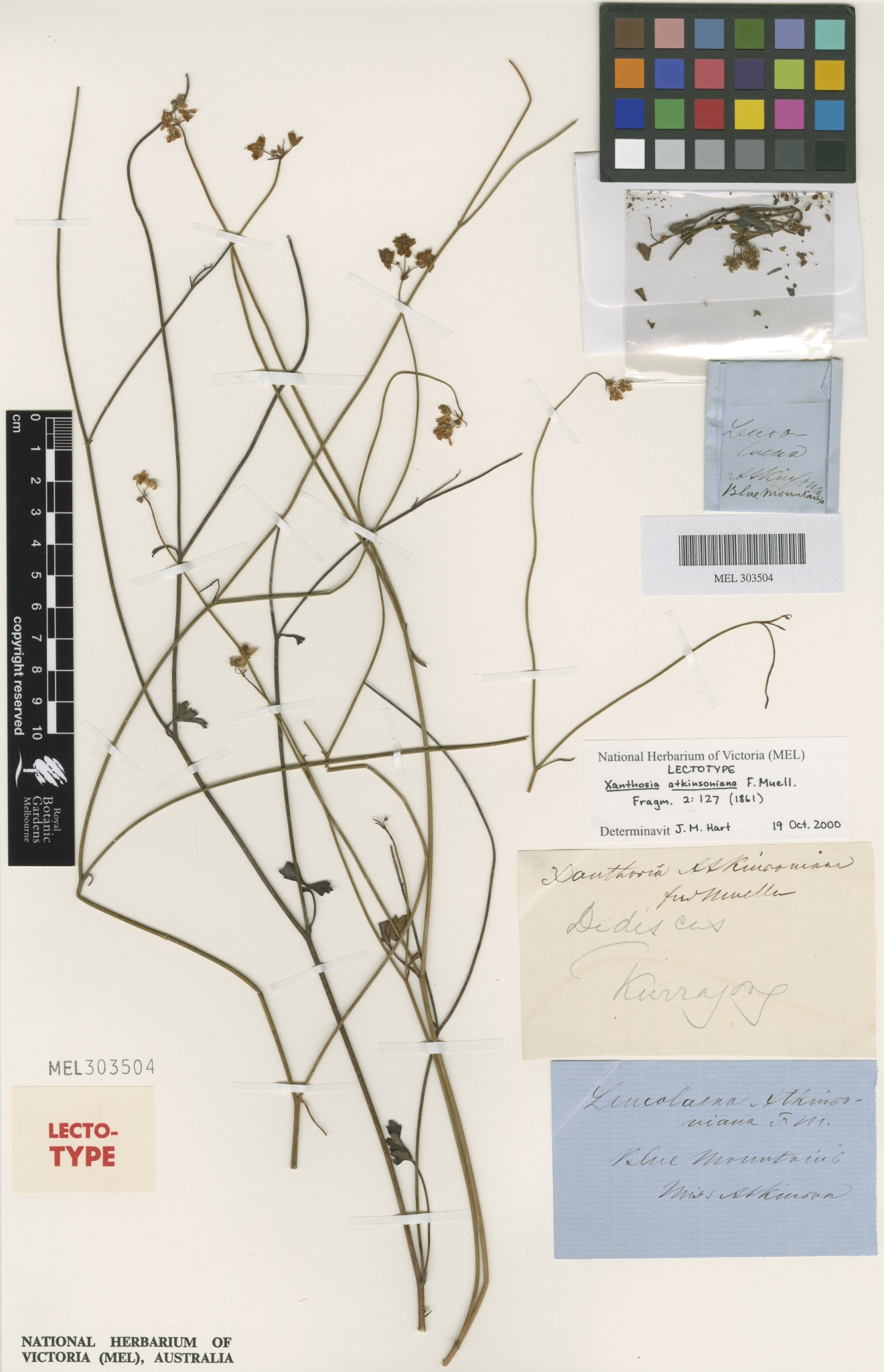
Specimen of Xanthosia atkinsoniana

Atkinson produced a large body of articles and illustrations about Australian native plants, as well as sending specimens that she had collected to botanists, including William Woolls and Ferdinand von Mueller. She became the namesake of several species, including the genus Atkinsonia and the species Erechtites atkinsoniae, Epacris calvertiana, and Helichrysum calvertianum. The former was named after her by von Mueller, to whom she sent over 300 specimens, in his work Fragmenta phytographiae Australiae. Von Mueller described her as "a lady who, by her various collections and artistic skill, contributed materially to the natural history of the Blue Mountains".

Atkinson contributed scientific articles, many of them illustrated, to journals and to the Horticultural Magazine. In addition to her scientific works, she wrote on natural history for a popular audience. Her illustrated articles on botany appeared consistently in newspapers under the initials "LA" and "LC" from 1853 onwards. She wrote a regular column, "A Voice from the Country", for The Sydney Morning Herald and The Sydney Mail. Atkinson primarily wrote about plants, but also described native animals and birds in her writing. She sometimes suggested new uses for Australian native plants as food and medicine.

== Bibliography ==
- Gertrude the Emigrant (J. R. Clarke, 1857)
- Cowanda: The Veteran's Grant (J. R. Clarke, 1859)
- Debatable Ground (serialised in the Sydney Mail, 1861)
- Myra (serialised in the Sydney Mail, 1864)
- Tom Hellicar's Children (serialised in the Sydney Mail, 1871)
- Tressa's Resolve (serialised in the Sydney Mail, 1872)
