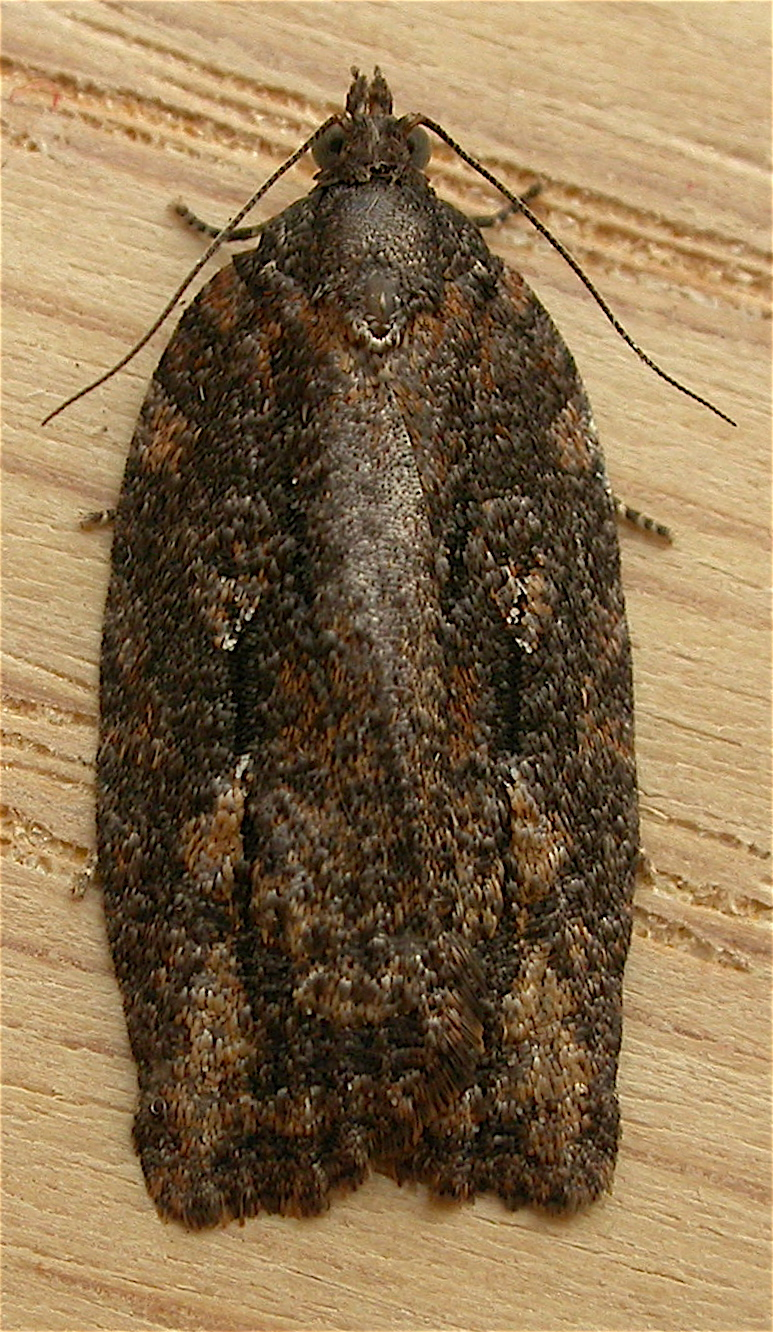

Scientific classification
- Domain: Eukaryota
- Kingdom: Animalia
- Phylum: Arthropoda
- Class: Insecta
- Order: Lepidoptera
- Family: Tortricidae
- Genus: Acropolitis
- Species: A. excelsa

Binomial name
- Acropolitis excelsa (Meyrick, 1910)

Synonyms
- Acropolitis xuthobapta (Turner, 1945)

= Acropolitis excelsa =

Species of moth

Acropolitis excelsa is a moth of the family Tortricidae. It is found in Australia.
