= Paul Calvert (whistleblower) =

British whistleblower

Paul John Calvert
- Occupations: Whistleblower, former NHS employee
- Known for: Exposing North East Ambulance Service cover-ups

Paul John Calvert is a British whistleblower recognized for his role in exposing systemic failings and cover-ups within the North East Ambulance Service (NEAS), a National Health Service (NHS) trust in England. His disclosures, which began in May 2022, revealed that NEAS had withheld evidence of paramedic errors linked to patient deaths, leading to extensive media coverage by outlets such as The Sunday Times and BBC, an official government review, and discussions on NHS accountability and whistleblower protections.

== Early life and career ==
Calvert initially worked as a police officer in the United Kingdom before joining the North East Ambulance Service (NEAS) as a coroner’s officer, a role in which he prepared reports for coronial inquests. His employment with NEAS concluded in December 2022, following his whistleblowing activities.

== Whistleblowing ==
In May 2022, Calvert provided evidence to The Sunday Times, alleging that NEAS had concealed paramedic errors associated with more than 90 patient deaths, including those of Andrew Edward Watson and Quinn Evie Milburn-Beadle. He further elaborated on these claims through interviews with BBC Newsnight, BBC Sounds, and BBC News at Six. Among the documents he disclosed was the 2020 Interim Audit One report, which NEAS had kept confidential until the Information Commissioner’s Office mandated its release in November 2024. Calvert declined a £41,000 non-disclosure agreement (NDA) proposed by NEAS, a decision that led to his dismissal from the organization. He also accused NEAS of bullying and blackmail, allegations that were raised in the UK Parliament by Labour MP Wes Streeting during an Urgent Questions session on 23 May 2022.

== Impact ==
Calvert’s disclosures precipitated several significant developments:

- Government review: NHS England initiated an independent review, chaired by Dame Marianne Griffiths, which was published in July 2023. The review confirmed operational failings within NEAS but was criticized by Calvert and affected families for its limited scope.
- Regulatory responses: Calvert’s refusal to sign the NDA sparked a broader debate on the use of gagging clauses within the NHS, prompting the Solicitors Regulation Authority to issue warnings to legal professionals in 2023. The Griffiths review recommended that NHS England impose restrictions on the use of NDAs. Additionally, the Nursing and Midwifery Council and the Health and Care Professions Council launched fitness-to-practice investigations, resulting in the removal of several clinicians from their professional registers by 2025.
- Inquests: At least two inquests, including one related to Andrew Edward Watson scheduled for May 2025, were reopened following Calvert’s revelations.
- Public campaign: Calvert has supported families of affected patients in their call for a public inquiry into NEAS practices, a campaign reinforced by a petition that garnered over 2,000 signatures by 2025.

== Personal life ==
Calvert has publicly addressed the personal consequences of his whistleblowing, reporting experiences of depression and anxiety that required medication and counseling, in addition to the loss of his job. Following his dismissal from NEAS in December 2022, he launched a crowdfunded legal appeal to address these challenges. As of March 2025, he continues to engage actively with families impacted by NEAS issues, contributing to their ongoing efforts for accountability.
