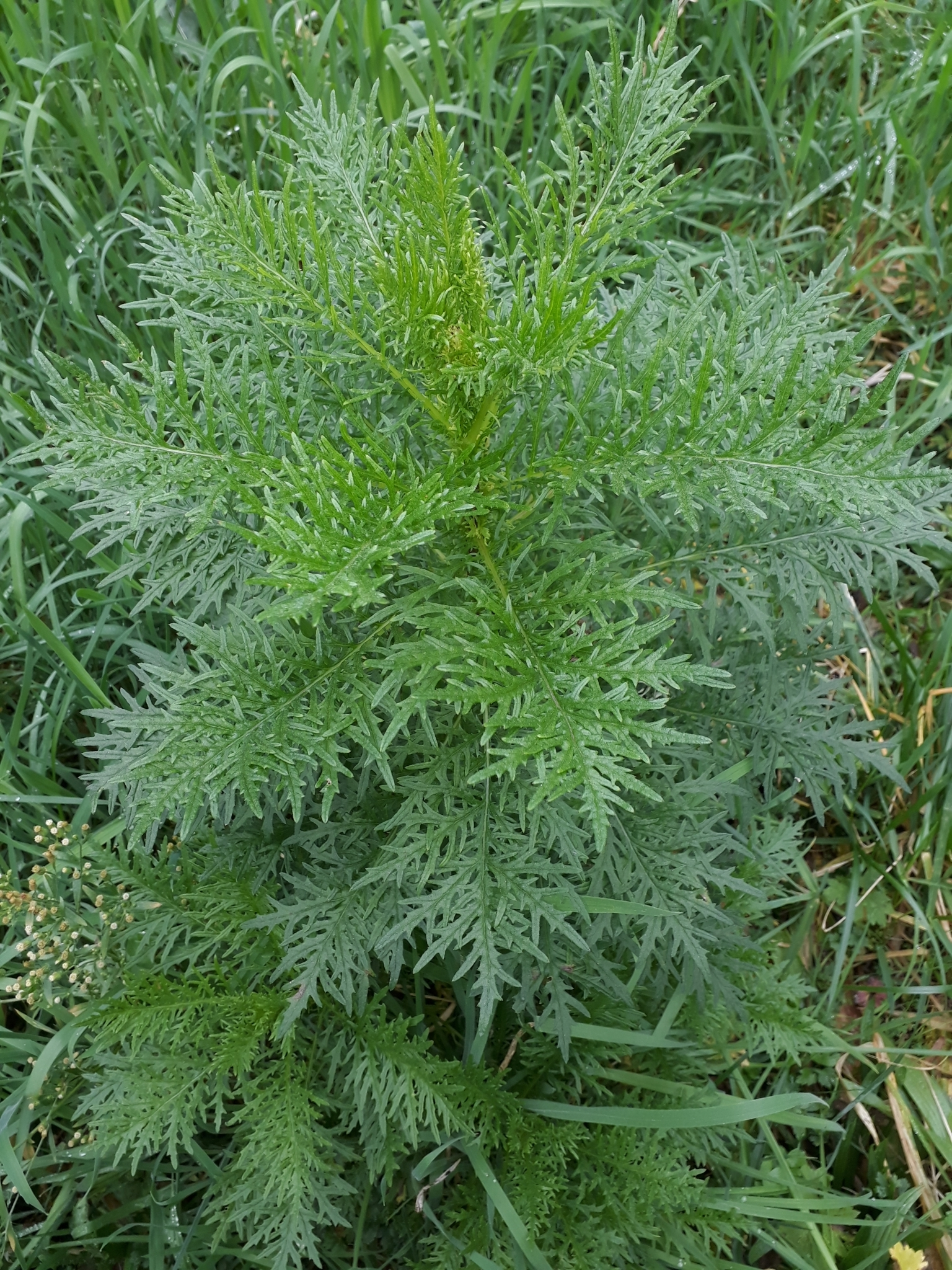
- S. bipinnatisectus in Waikanae

Conservation status
- Not Threatened (NZ TCS)

Scientific classification
- Kingdom: Plantae
- Clade: Tracheophytes
- Clade: Angiosperms
- Clade: Eudicots
- Clade: Asterids
- Order: Asterales
- Family: Asteraceae
- Genus: Senecio
- Species: S. bipinnatisectus

Binomial name
- Senecio bipinnatisectus Belcher

= Senecio bipinnatisectus =

Species of flowering plant

Senecio bipinnatisectus is a species of flowering plant, native to Australia and New Zealand. It is sometimes called Commonwealth weed in Australia, but Australian fireweed in New Zealand.

== Description ==
Senecio binnatisectus grows up to 3m in height. It grows highly divided leaves, as well as very short stipule-like leaf blades near petioles, which are themselves short. Both sides of the leaves are hirsute, although the lower or middle cauline leaves can be glabrous.

The flowers grow in a cyme pattern, with many yellow flower heads. They grow from December to June or August.

== Range and habitat ==
This plant grows in Queensland and New South Wales in Australia, generally in places with lots of light, as along roads or in clearings. In New Zealand it grows in similar disturbed sites. It was previously considered to have been introduced to New Zealand, but is now believed to have made the passage across the Tasman Sea without human assistance.

== Etymology ==
The name senecio comes from the Latin senex meaning "old man". The species name most likely refers to the divided nature of the leaves.
