= Frederick Calvert (footballer) =

English footballer

Personal information
- Full name: Frederick J. Calvert
- Place of birth: Southend-on-Sea, England
- Position: Inside right

Senior career*
Years	Team	Apps	(Gls)
- Army
1910–1911	Woolwich Arsenal	2	(1)
- * Club domestic league appearances and goals

Frederick J. Calvert was an English footballer who played as an inside right for Woolwich Arsenal in the Football League. He also played for the Army.
