= James Calvert (explorer) =

Australian explorer and botanist

- Born: James Snowden Calvert; 13 July 1825; Otley, Yorkshire, England
- Died: 22 July 1884 (aged 59); Sydney, New South Wales, Australia
- Spouse: Louisa Atkinson 1869–1872 (her death)

James Snowden Calvert (13 July 1825 – 22 July 1884), was an explorer and botanist, active in colonial Australia.

== Life ==
Calvert was born in Otley, Yorkshire, England, and received his schooling in Liverpool, Manchester, Birmingham, and London, where his family successively resided after leaving the Borders. Having friends in New South Wales, Calvert and a brother decided to migrate there, in 1840.

On the voyage to Australia, in the ship Sir Edward Paget, Calvert developed a lasting friendship with Dr. Ludwig Leichhardt, the explorer. They arrived in Australia in 1841. The result was that Calvert agreed to accompany Leichhardt on his first expedition, providing his own horses and outfit. The party left Moreton Bay settlement (Brisbane) in 1844 for Port Essington, on the north coast, and after many hardships and difficulties, including numerous conflicts with Aborigines, accomplished their mission and returned to Sydney late in 1845. Details of the expedition were later published by Leichhardt, who wrote: "The only one who behaved perfectly, with few exceptions, was a young man, Mr. Calvert, who came in the same boat with me from England".

Calvert was an exhibitor at the earlier exhibitions in London and Paris, and at the 1862 International Exhibition, London, was awarded a silver medal for his collection of Australian paper-making materials. Soon after the arrival of Sir William Denison as governor he was placed on the commission of the peace at Sydney. He married the Australian author and botanical collector Louisa Atkinson on 11 March 1869, and after her sudden death in childbirth in 1872 he led a retired life.

Calvert died in New South Wales on 22 July 1884.
