= William Woolls =

Australian botanist (1814-1893)

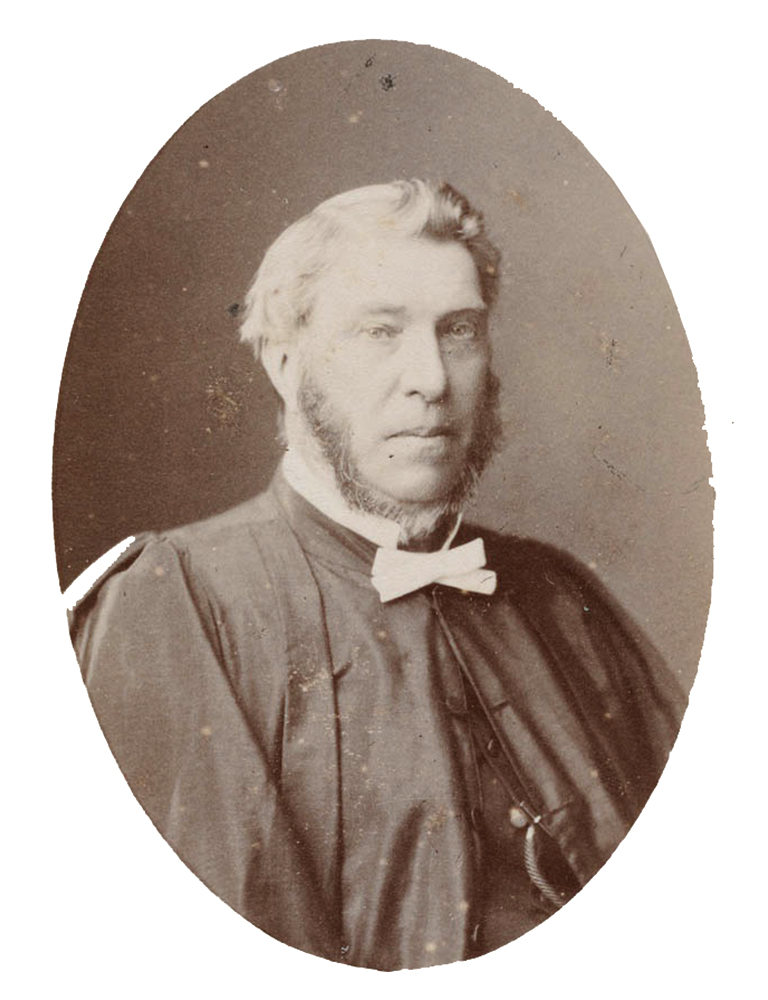
Studio Portrait of Reverend William Woolls, c. 1880, by J Herbert Newman

William Woolls (30 March 1814 – 14 March 1893) was an Australian botanist, clergyman and schoolmaster.

Woolls, the nineteenth child of merchant Edward Woolls, was born at Winchester, England and educated at the grammar school, Bishop's Waltham. He moved to Sydney on 16 April 1832, and was soon appointed an assistant-master at The King's School, Parramatta, having met William Grant Broughton—then Church of England Archdeacon of New South Wales—on the way out. He married Dinah Catherine Hall in 1838 and she bore a son and a daughter before dying in childbirth in 1844. In 1845, he married Ann Boag.

According to K. J. Cable, "... Woolls was best known for his promotion of Australian botany and his assistance to other scholars rather than for large-scale systematic work."

He died of paraplegia in the Sydney suburb of Burwood survived by his third wife.
