= John Calvert Griffiths =

John Calvert Griffiths CMG KC SC
- Born: John Calvert Griffiths; 16 January 1931 (age 95); Persia
- Education: Saint Peter's, York; Emmanuel College, Cambridge University
- Occupation: Barrister
- Height: 6 ft 0 in (183 cm)
- Spouse(s): 1st Elizabeth Jessamy Jean Crowden; 2nd Marie Charlotte Biddulph
- Children: Kate; Anna; Alyson
- Parent(s): Oswald Griffiths; Christina Flora Griffiths (nee Littlejohn)

John Calvert Griffiths CMG KC SC was the Attorney General of Hong Kong from 1979 to 1983.

== Early life ==
Griffiths was born in Persia, now Iran, on 16 January 1931. He is the son of Oswald Hardy Griffiths and Christina Flora Griffiths (née Littlejohn).

He was educated at St. Peter's School, York where he was a scholar. He then did his National Service from 1949 to 1950 and held the rank of Lieutenant.

He then attended Emmanuel College, Cambridge where he obtained a Bachelor of Arts in 1955 and a Master of Arts in 1960.

== Legal Practice in England ==
Griffiths was called to the bar of the Middle Temple in 1956. He was appointed a Recorder in 1972, a position he held until 1990.

He was made a King's Counsel in 1972.

He was a member of the executive committee of the Inns of Court and the Bar from 1973 to 1977 and a member of the Senate between 1984 and 1986.

== Attorney General of Hong Kong ==
Griffiths first came to Hong Kong in 1976 to prosecute the Ma brothers for importing heroin in a triad case which garnered the involvement of the CIA.

Three years later, in 1979, Griffiths was appointed Attorney General of Hong Kong.

In his capacity as Attorney General, he served on the Hong Kong Executive Council and Legislative Council. He also served as Chairman of the Hong Kong Law Reform Commission.

He served as Attorney General until 1983 and was succeeded by Michael Thomas QC.

== Post AG practice ==
After stepping down as Attorney General, Griffiths entered private practice as a barrister in Hong Kong and England, handling both civil and criminal matters. He succeeded Neil Kaplan Q.C. as Head of Chambers of Des Voeux Chambers in 1990. He retired from full-time practice in 2012, but still remains a door tenant at Des Voeux Chambers.

In 1984 and 1985 he headed an inquiry in England into the membership of the House of Fraser.

In Hong Kong, he defended Chim Pui-Chung in a costly, 131-day-long trial in the late 1990s. He also represented Lucille Fung, wife of retired judge Miles Henry Jackson-Lipkin, but withdrew when her state of mind made discussions with her difficult.

He acted for Nancy Kissel when she was charged with the murder of her husband.

Griffiths also acted in the following cases:

- Representing a leading firm of developers against the Housing Authority, in relation to the Private Sector Participation Scheme.
- Representing New World Development Co. Ltd to apply for leave for Judicial Review about arguments regarding the proposed listing on the Hong Kong Stock Exchange.
- advising a leading property firm against the Government about work conditions regarding Times Square.
- advising the Oriental Daily News in respect of a libel claim.
- representing a famous Cantonese singer in a claim involving tax.

Legal offices
Preceded by John Williams Dixon Hobley	Attorney General of Hong Kong; 1979–1983	Succeeded by Michael David Thomas
