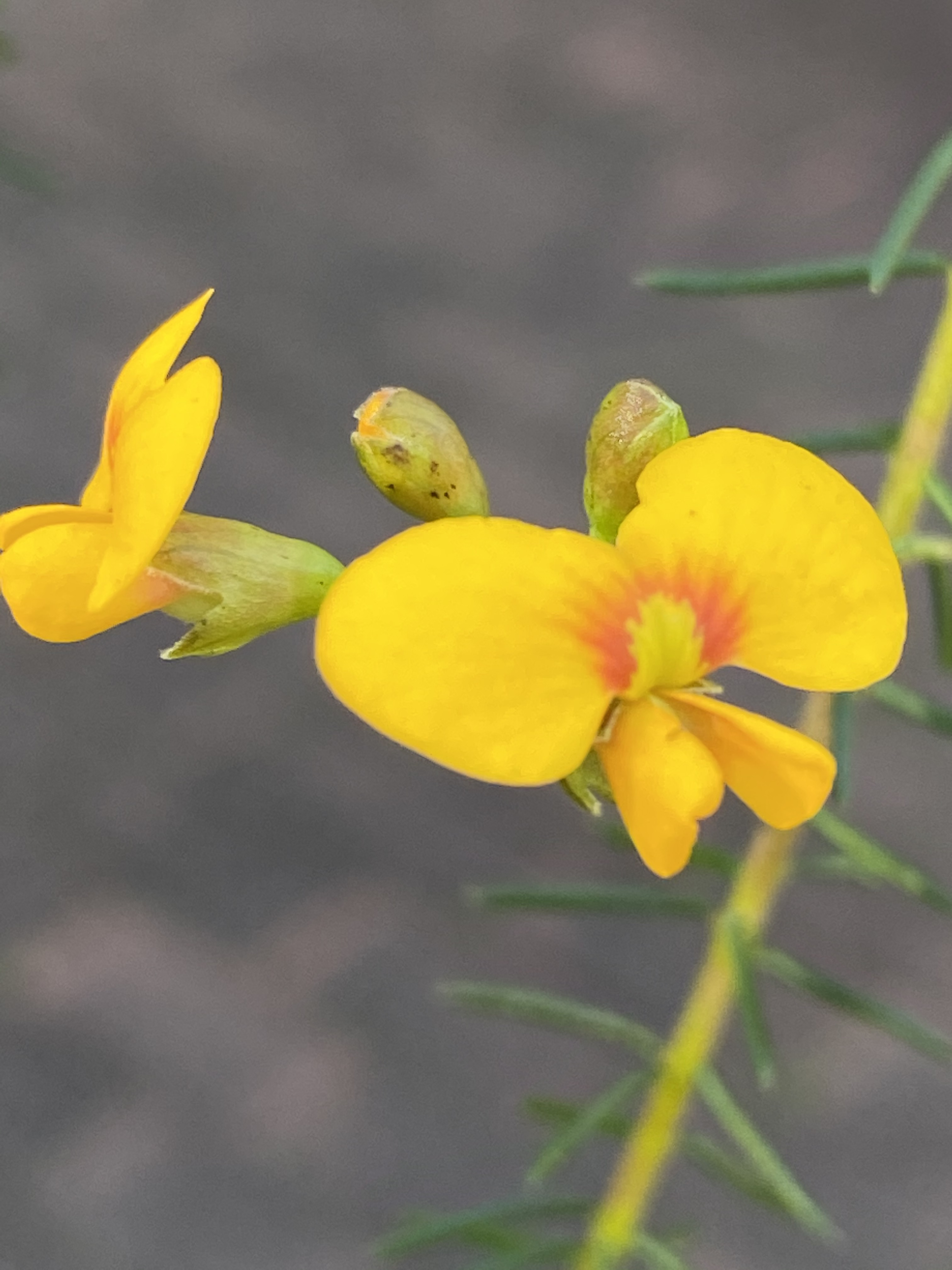

Scientific classification
- Kingdom: Plantae
- Clade: Tracheophytes
- Clade: Angiosperms
- Clade: Eudicots
- Clade: Rosids
- Order: Fabales
- Family: Fabaceae
- Subfamily: Faboideae
- Genus: Dillwynia
- Species: D. retorta

Binomial name
- Dillwynia retorta (J.C.Wendl.) Druce

= Dillwynia retorta =

Eggs and bacon

Species of legume

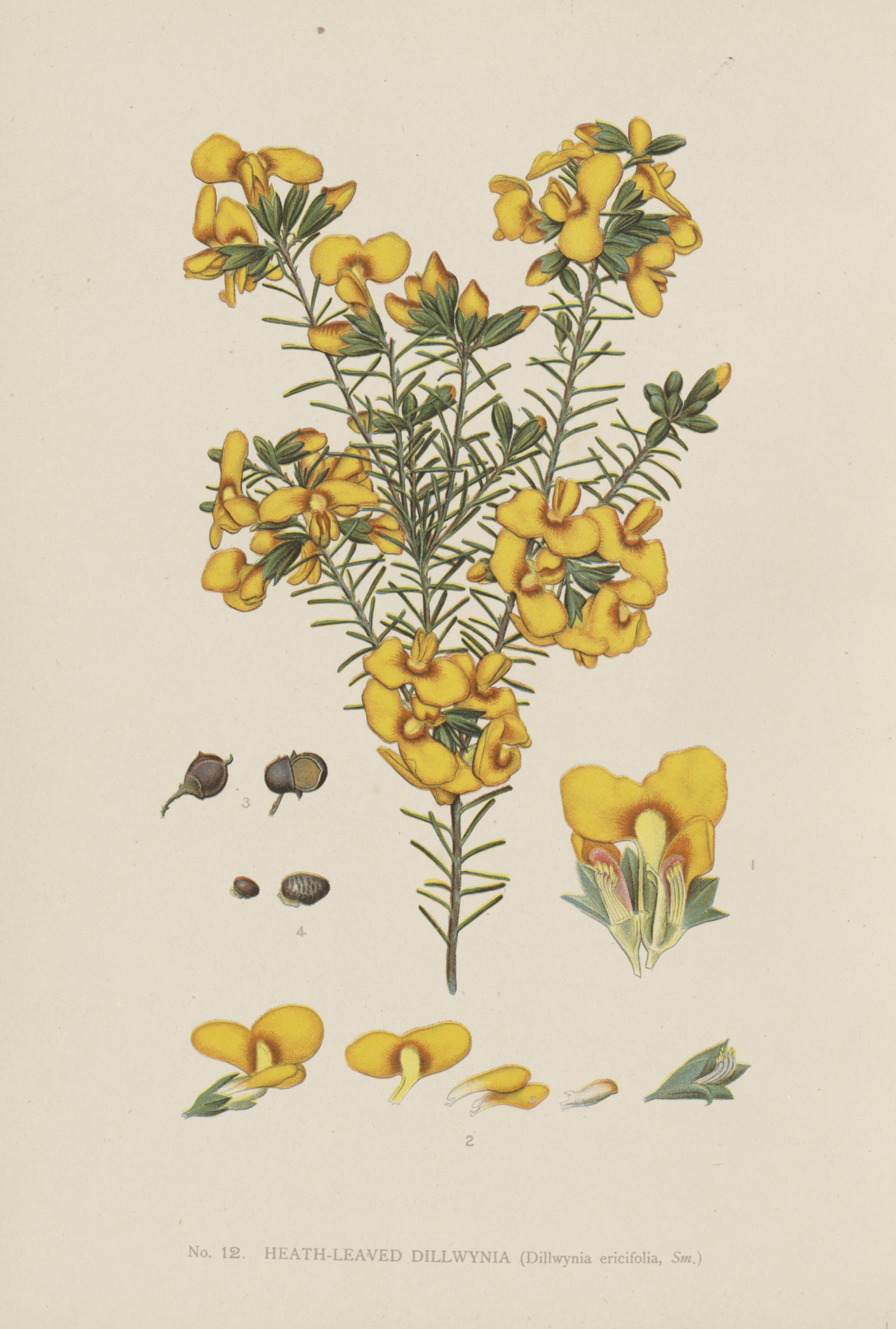
Illustration from Joseph Maiden's book The Flowering Plants and Ferns of New South Wales.

Dillwynia retorta, commonly known as eggs and bacon, is a species of flowering plant shrub in the family Fabaceae and grows in New South Wales and Queensland. It is usually an erect shrub with thin, smooth, crowded leaves and yellow flowers with red markings.

== Description ==
Dillwynia retorta is a small, upright shrub to 3 m (9.8 ft) high, with stems covered in short, erect, soft hairs or soft, weak, thin, separated hairs. The leaves are narrowly oblong to linear, about 4–12 mm (0.16–0.47 in) long, spirally twisted, needle-like, smooth or minutely warty, tapering at the apex and sometimes curved. The inflorescence are in terminal clusters in leaf axils of up to 9 flowers on a peduncle 0–2 cm (0.00–0.79 in) long. The bracts are mostly below the flowers, 1–2 mm (0.039–0.079 in) long, calyx 3–6 mm (0.12–0.24 in) long, smooth externally or often with tiny hairs. The larger, broader, yellow petal at the back of the flower is 5–12 mm (0.20–0.47 in) long, the centre a reddish colour. The smooth seed pod 4–7 mm (0.16–0.28 in) long. Flowering occurs from June to November.

== Taxonomy ==
This species was first formally described as Pultenea retorta in 1799 by Johann Christoph Wendland and the description was published in Hortus Herrenhusanus. In 1917 George Druce changed the name to Dillwynia retorta and the change was published in The Botanical Exchange Club and Society of the British Isles Report for 1916.

== Distribution and habitat ==
Dillwynia retorta grows in heath and forest from south-east Queensland to the Budawang Range in southern New South Wales.

== Ecology ==
It is a host plant for the jewel beetle species Ethonion jessicae.
