= Prosecutions Division =

Criminal Prosecution division

The Prosecutions Division (刑事檢控科) is the public prosecution office of Hong Kong led by the Director of Public Prosecutions, under the Department of Justice. The Prosecutions Division is the largest in the department, with about 125 lawyers, known as 'Public Prosecutors', and about 115 lay prosecutors, known as 'Court Prosecutors'. The role of the Division is to prosecute trials and appeals on behalf of Hong Kong, to provide legal advice to law enforcement agencies upon their investigations, and generally to exercise on behalf of the Secretary for Justice the discretion of whether or not to bring criminal proceedings in Hong Kong. In addition, counsel in the Division provide advice and assistance to Government bureaux and departments in relation to any criminal law aspects of proposed legislation.

The lawyers of the Prosecution Division in the former British Hong Kong colonial administration were, before 1997, titled "Crown Counsel"(檢察官). After the handover of Hong Kong, they were renamed "Government Counsel" (政府律師). In 2007, to highlight their constitutional independence, lawyers working in the Prosecutions Division adopted the alternative title of "Public Prosecutor" (檢控官).

== Structure ==
The Division is headed by a Director, who is supported by five deputy directors of Public Prosecutions (DDPP) in charge of different sub-divisions:

1. Sub-division I (Advisory): Responsible for cases in the Court of First Instance, District Court, and Magistrates' Court
2. Sub-division II (Policy and Administration / Chief of Staff): Responsible for providing advice to other government departments and a wide range of administrative matters, including human resources, training, and media relations
3. Sub-division III (Advocacy and Appeals): Responsible for advocacy work on all levels, and are also responsible for advising and conducting appeals
4. Sub-division IV (Commercial Crime): Responsible for prosecuting all instances of commercial crime
5. Special Duties: Responsible for ad hoc large scale projects as directed by the DPP, as well as certain public-order crime and cybercrime

One Deputy Director sub-division will also be designated as Chief of Staff; currently, this is with Sub-division II.

== Prosecutors ==
=== Senior counsel prosecutors ===
In order to save costs on briefing out complicated cases to expensive senior counsel, the Department of Justice has been trying to groom in-house prosecutors to achieve Senior Counsel status; however, with the departure of William Tam in 2024, there are currently no Senior Counsel prosecutors left.

The following is a list of former prosecutors who were appointed Senior Counsel during their tenure with the Department (since 1997 onwards); the year of elevation is indicated in brackets.

1. John Reading, SC (1999): Entered private practice with Pacific Chambers
2. Michael Blanchflower, SC (2001): Entered private practice with Parkside Chambers
3. Arthur Luk, SC (2002): Entered private practice with Cheng Huan SC Chambers
4. Kevin Zervos, SC (2003): Appointed Judge of the Court of First Instance
5. Ian McWalters, SC (2005): Appointed a Judge of the Court of First Instance
6. Robert Lee, SC (2008): Entered private practice with Cheng Huan SC Chambers
7. Simon Tam, SC (2013): Retired
8. Wesley Wong, SC (2013): Appointed Solicitor General
9. Martin Hui, SC (2015): Entered private practice with Plowman Chambers
10. David Leung, SC (2015): Entered private practice with Liberty Chambers
11. William Tam, SC (2015): Appointed Judge of the Court of First Instance
12. Anna Lai, SC (2016): Entered private practice with Plowman Chambers
13. Vinci Lam, SC (2021): Entered private practice with Plowman Chambers

== Directors of Public Prosecutions ==
1. Peter Nguyen SBS QC SC (1997)
2. Grenville Cross SBS QC SC (1997–2009)
3. Ian McWalters SC (2009–2011)
4. Kevin Zervos SC (2011–2013)
5. Keith Yeung SC (2013–2017)
6. David Leung SC (2017–2020)
7. Maggie Yang (2021–present)
