= Australia–Hong Kong relations =

- Australia: Hong Kong

Australia–Hong Kong relations refers to bilateral relations between the Hong Kong Special Administrative Region of China and the Commonwealth of Australia. Both Hong Kong and Australia were former British colonies and thus maintain cultural and economic ties. Australia is represented in Hong Kong through its Consulate-General located Harbour Centre, Wan Chai while Hong Kong is represented thorough the Hong Kong Economic and Trade Office in Sydney.

Australian policy towards Hong Kong is guided by its extensive economic interests in Hong Kong.

== History pre-2000 ==
July 1989 - Australia grants “safe haven” visas to over 27,000 Chinese students following the Tiananmen Square crackdown, allowing them to stay permanently.

== History post-2000 ==
- 2017 - Australia shelves its negotiated extradition treaty with China after it becomes clear that the Australian Senate will vote against it.
- January 2019 - The Australian Foreign Minister announces the establishment of the National Foundation for Australia-China Relations.
- January 2020 - Free trade and investment agreement detailed by the Australian Government's Department of Foreign Affairs and Trade comes into effect.
- July 2020 - China warned of further actions against Australia, with Foreign Ministry spokesperson Zhao Lijian stating that any consequences would be Australia's responsibility.
- October 2020 - Australia suspends the bilateral extradition agreement with Hong Kong as a result of concerns over the NSL.
- December 2023 - Hong Kong and Australia trade $17 billion worth of goods and services in 2023, with Australia exporting $2.9 billion worth of services and $9.8 billion worth of goods to Hong Kong.
- December 2023 - With $146.6 billion in stock in 2023, Hong Kong ranks as Australia's fifth-largest source of total foreign investment (direct, portfolio, and other).
- December 2023 - With $74.7 billion in stock in 2023, Hong Kong ranks as the tenth-largest investment destination in Australia overall.

== Bilateral agreements ==
Articles 151, 153 and 155 of Hong Kong Basic Law permit Hong Kong to conclude commercial and cultural agreements with foreign countries, while article 152 permits Hong Kong to join international organisations under the name "Hong Kong, China".

Both Hong Kong and Australia are full members of APEC and FATF, and are bilateral participants on air services agreement (since 1993), Investment Promotion and Protection Agreement (since October 1993) superseded by the Australia - Hong Kong Investment Agreement (2019), Mutual Legal Assistance Agreement (since 1999), Surrender of Fugitive Offenders Agreement (since June 1997), Transfer of Sentenced Persons Agreement (since 2006).

Following the enactment of the Hong Kong National Security Law, which Australia regards as being in breach of the Sino-British Joint Declaration, on 7 July, the Australian government issued an official travel advisory warning travellers and Australian passport holders residing in Hong Kong, advising the latter group: “If you’re concerned about the new law, reconsider your need to remain in Hong Kong." On 9 July 2020, Australia suspended its extradition agreement with Hong Kong, which had been in place since 1993 and offered to extend visas by five years for Hong Kong residents currently in the country, and opening a pathway to permanent residency for up to 10,000 people working and studying in Australia.

== Political relationships ==
Australia's policy toward Hong Kong is underpinned by its substantial commercial interests, and by the presence of a large Australian community living in Hong Kong.

Article 82 of Hong Kong Basic Law permits Hong Kong to invite judges from other common law jurisdictions to sit on the Court of Final Appeal. The Hong Kong Government continues to hire and appoint Australians, with or without the right of abode in Hong Kong, to senior posts in the Hong Kong Judiciary. Former Hong Kong Directors of Public Prosecutions, Ian McWalters and Kevin Zervos, were appointed as High Court judges in 2011 and 2013 respectively, and both were subsequently elevated to the Court of Appeal in 2014 and 2018 respectively. Sir Anthony Mason, Murray Gleeson, James Spigelman, William Gummow and Robert French have been appointed to the Court of Final Appeal as Non-Permanent Judges from other common law jurisdictions.

The Australian Consulate-General represents the Australian Government in Hong Kong. Some Australian states have trade or business offices in Hong Kong, including Queensland and Victoria. Hong Kong is not permitted under the Basic Law to have diplomatic relations with other countries, but maintains the Hong Kong Economic and Trade Office in Sydney, Australia.

== Trade and investment ==
Monthly value of Australian merchandise exports to Hong Kong (A$ millions) since 1988

Monthly value of Hong Kong merchandise exports to Australia (A$ millions) since 1968

Australia's commercial interests in Hong Kong are extensive and range from banking, accounting, legal, engineering, information technology services and retail and general trading. Around 550 Australian companies are based in Hong Kong, and a further 1,000 Australian companies have representative offices.

== Cultural ==
Some 90,000 Australians are resident in Hong Kong. According to the 2016 Census, 86 886 people of Hong Kong origin live in Australia, with 280 943 Cantonese speakers in Australia, the largest number after Mandarin Chinese and Arabic. The majority Hong Kong immigrants live in Sydney and Melbourne.

Australia is one of the major English-speaking study destinations for students from Hong Kong due to monetary factors; while the Australian government is encouraging an enhanced two-way student mobility through the New Colombo Plan educational exchange.

== Tourism ==
Both Australia and Hong Kong have offered "Working Holiday Programs" without quota restriction for maximum of 12-months since September 2001. The programme allows students to holiday in Hong Kong or Australia and to take temporary employment as needed to cover the expenses of their visit. The programme aims to increase travel by young people between Australia and Hong Kong and to strengthen the links between the two regions.

== In popular culture ==
British satirical comedy The Day Today featured news coverage of a fictional trade agreement between Australia and Hong Kong. Host Chris Morris's impression of Jeremy Paxman's combative interview style swiftly led to the outbreak of war in Eastmanstown, on the "Australio-Hong Kong border".

== See also ==
- Hong Kong Australian
- Australian Consulate-General, Hong Kong and Macau
- Australians in Hong Kong
- Foreign relations of Hong Kong
- Foreign relations of Australia
