= Director of Public Prosecutions (Hong Kong) =

- Emblem of Hong Kong
- Incumbent; Anthony Chau Tin-hang
- Appointer: Secretary for Justice
- Term length: Varies (contract based); mandatory retirement age of 60
- Inaugural holder: Peter Van Tu Nguyen, QC, SC, 1997
- Formation: Hong Kong Basic Law; 1 July 1997

The Director of Public Prosecutions of Hong Kong (DPP) is a law officer and head of the Prosecutions Division of the Department of Justice; the director is responsible for directing the conduct of trials and appeals on behalf of Hong Kong, providing legal advice to law enforcement agencies (such as Hong Kong Police, Hong Kong Customs and Excise, and ICAC), exercising the discretion of whether to institute criminal proceedings, and providing advice to others in government on proposed changes to the criminal law.

Former directors include David Leung SC, a lifelong prosecutor who joined the Prosecutions Division in 1995; he was appointed director in 2017. Leung resigned on 31 July 2020, citing differences with Secretary for Justice Teresa Cheng, leaving the post at the end of the year.

The current director is Anthony Chau, who took office on 21 May 2026.

== History ==
=== British Hong Kong (before 1 July 1997) ===
Before the creation of a dedicated prosecutions division, prosecutions were handled by the Attorney General and the Crown Solicitor, with all crown counsel being public prosecutors ex officio. As is the case today, prosecutions were sometimes briefed out to outside counsel or conducted by lay officers of other government departments. By the early 1950s, the Legal Department had a prosecutions section staffed with four crown counsel, one of which was Patrick Yu, who became the first Chinese lawyer to become a crown counsel. While both Supreme Court and magistrates' court prosecutions were under the department's remit, most cases in the magistrates' courts were prosecuted by police inspectors.

The earliest mention of the position of DPP in statute was in an amendment to the Legal Officers Ordinance on 22 December 1966, which added the title of Director of Public Prosecutions to the Schedule of legal officers under the ordinance. The position was retitled Crown Prosecutor in 1979, and remained that way until the Handover in 1997, though the position continued to be commonly known as the Director of Public Prosecutions.

=== After the Handover (1997-present) ===
The position's title was restored to its original name upon the Handover on 1 July 1997. Maggie Yang, who was appointed on 13 August 2021 and served as the seventh post-Handover DPP, was the first woman and non-Queen's Counsel to be appointed to the position.

== Role ==
The Director may be appointed from a wide range of candidates, as long as they have been called to the Hong Kong Bar; they can be either in private practice or serving in the government, and may be of any nationality. The longest serving Director, Ian Grenville Cross QC SC, was a British career prosecutor, while the first Hong Kong Chinese Director Keith Yeung SC was an eminent criminal Senior Counsel in private practice.

As the head of the Prosecutions Division, the Director may or may not choose to be actively involved in court hearings. For example, while Keith Yeung was primarily known for directing overall policy and was rarely in court, David Leung was known to be actively involved and was often seen in court.

=== Independence of the director ===
The Secretary for Justice, a politically appointed role, is the chief prosecutor and ultimately can direct the Director on criminal prosecution matters. This has come under fire from a number of legal experts in Hong Kong, including former prosecutor Ian Grenville Cross QC SC, eminent criminal defense lawyer Cheng Huan QC SC, barrister and legal sector legislator Dennis Kwok, as well as the South China Morning Post (in an editorial). Cross has argued that Hong Kong should follow the United Kingdom, where the Attorney General for England and Wales transferred criminal prosecuting powers to the UK's Director in 2009.

=== Retirement ===
Directors are required to retire at age 60, and may return to private practice. Traditionally, however, outgoing Directors are offered the chance of a High Court judgeship; Directors appointed to the High Court must go through a six-month "cooling-off" period, in which they are kept out of any criminal trials, civil cases, or appeals involving the government. To date, Cross remains the only Director not to become a High Court judge post-retirement, but whether this was due to his own personal choice or the fact that a position was not offered to him is unclear.

== List of Directors of Public Prosecutions ==
=== Before the Handover (1966-1997) ===
1. Ross Penlington (1975-1977)
2. David Boy, QC (1979–1982)
3. Max Lucas, QC (1982–1984)
4. Joseph Duffy, QC (1984–1986)
5. James Findlay, QC (1986–1989)
6. Anthony Duckett, QC (Acting, 1989–1990)
7. John Wood, CB (1990–1994)
8. Peter Nguyen, QC (1994–1997)

=== After the Handover (1997-present) ===
No.	Name	Name in Chinese	Nationality	Tenure start	Tenure end	Tenure length	Higher education	Appointed by	Further judicial appointments	Notes	Silk
1	Peter Van Tu Nguyen, SBS, QC, SC (1943–2020; aged 76)	阮雲道	Chinese	1 July 1997	14 October 1997	106 days	City Law School	Elsie Leung	Judge of the Court of First Instance (1997–2008)	Assumed role of Director as incumbent Crown Prosecutor; Shortest serving Director	QC (1995)
2	Ian Grenville Cross, GBS, QC, SC; Born 15 June 1951 (age 75)	江樂士	British	15 October 1997	21 October 2009	12 years and 7 days	University of Southampton (LLB); College of Law	Elsie Leung		First Director to be appointed; Last QC to be appointed Director; First Director to not join judiciary post-retirement; Longest serving Director	QC (1990)
3	Ian Charles McWalters, GBS, SC; Born 17 February 1951 (age 75)	麥偉德	Australian	22 October 2009	9 February 2011	1 year and 111 days	University of Sydney (BA, LLB)	Wong Yan-lung, SC	Judge of the Court of First Instance (2011–14); Justice of Appeal of the Court of Appeal (2014–21)	First SC to be appointed Director	SC (2005)
4	Kevin Paul Zervos, SC; Born 25 November 1953 (age 72)	薛偉成	Australian	25 March 2011	8 September 2013	2 years and 168 days	Monash University (BS, LLB); University of Hong Kong (LLM (HR))	Wong Yan-lung, SC	Judge of the Court of First Instance (2013–18); Justice of Appeal of the Court of Appeal (2018–)		SC (2003)
5	Keith Yeung Kar-hung, SC; Born 1964 (age 61–62)	楊家雄	Chinese	9 September 2013	8 September 2017	4 years and 0 days	University of Hong Kong (LLB, PCLL)	Rimsky Yuen, SC	Deputy Judge of the Court of First Instance (2018–19); Judge of the Court of First Instance (2019–)	First local Hong Kong Chinese Director; First Director to be appointed from private practice	SC (2009)
6	David Leung Cheuk-yin, SC; Born 15 December 1966 (age 59)	梁卓然	Chinese	29 December 2017	31 December 2020	3 years and 3 days	University of Hong Kong (LLB, PCLL, LLM, LLM (HR))	Rimsky Yuen, SC		First Director to go into private practice	SC (2015)
7	Maggie Yang Mei-kei	楊美琪	Chinese	13 August 2021	20 May 2026	4 years and 281 days	University of Wales	Teresa Cheng, SC		First woman appointed Director; First non-Silk to be appointed Director	
8	Anthony Chau Tin-hang	周天行	Chinese	21 May 2026	Incumbent	110 days		Paul Lam, SC			

The incumbent Director is an unofficial Justice of the Peace and is given the "JP" designation while in office; this designation is removed upon leaving office, unless officially appointed separately.
