= Andrew Left =

Convicted securities fraudster, short seller and author (born 1970)

- Born: July 9, 1970 (age 56); Michigan, U.S.
- Education: Northeastern University
- Occupations: financial analyst, financial writer, short seller
- Years active: 1995 – present
- Organization: Citron Research
- Known for: Activist short selling, Financial fraud, market manipulation
- Spouses: Andrea Left (m. 2001–2008): Stephanie Left
- Children: 4
- Website: citronresearch.com

Andrew Edward Left (born July 9, 1970) is a convicted fraudster, an activist short seller, author, and editor of the online investment newsletter Citron Research, formerly StockLemon.com. On June 1, 2026, Left was found guilty on 13 counts of fraud.

Under the name Citron Research, Left publishes reports on firms that he claims are overvalued or are engaged in fraud. Left is known for advising investors on short selling and has often appeared on various media outlets such as CNBC and Bloomberg to talk about his opinions on stocks. In 2017, Left was called 'The Bounty Hunter of Wall Street' by The New York Times.

Citron launched 51 investigative reports against S&P 500 companies, as well as several Chinese companies, citing allegations of pyramid schemes, ineffective products and accounting, or business frauds. In 2016, Left was banned for five years by the Hong Kong Market Misconduct Tribunal (chaired by Justice Michael Hartmann) for allegedly disclosing false or misleading information in connection with the publication of a research report on Chinese property developer Evergrande Group, and so inducing transactions under the Securities and Futures Ordinance. Although Left's report was correct, his punishment was not rescinded. Despite being sued by multiple companies for the reports he has released, Left once claimed he has never lost a case in the United States.

Before Citron Research, the National Futures Association sanctioned Left and stated that he "made false and misleading statements to cheat, defraud or deceive a customer in violation of NFA compliance rules." In July 2024, federal prosecutors arrested and charged Left with multiple civil and criminal charges, alleging he illegally manipulated the stock market. On June 1, 2026, Left was found guilty on 13 counts of fraud and other charges, with a sentencing hearing scheduled for August 31, 2026. He faces a statutory maximum sentence of 25 years in federal prison. Left promises to appeal.

== Early life and career ==
Left was born in a Detroit suburb to a Jewish family and later moved with his family to Coral Springs, Florida. He attended Coral Springs High School where he was a member of the debate team and president of the Jewish youth group. He graduated from Northeastern University in 1993.

Left's first job was with Universal Commodity Corp, a high-pressure commodities brokerage firm that hired salespeople to make cold calls and push "questionable investments." Left quit in March 1994, after 9 months with the company. When the National Futures Association sanctioned the firm in December 1998, Left, along with every other former employee, was sanctioned for three years along with being required to take an ethics-training course as part of the probe into the firm for making false statements to sell commodity futures contracts. The National Futures Association stated Left “made false and misleading statements to cheat, defraud or deceive a customer in violation of NFA compliance rules.”

Left became active in short selling by the age of 24. He has cited his experience with Universal Commodity Corp as the reason he started short selling stocks promoted by boiler-room scams. When the boiler rooms eventually went out of business, Left started shorting stocks from bulletin-board scams, in which people would send out email blasts saying, "Buy this stock now or you'll miss out."

In April 1999, Left became president and CEO of Detour Media. He was named director of the company in November 1999.

Left switched to shorting the stocks full-time, using his own research to publish free reports on firms he feels are overvalued or engaged in fraud. In 2001, he founded StockLemon.com, now known as Citron Research. According to Left, he has made profits every year since he started short selling.

He was a keynote speaker at the 2017 and 2018 Harvard Business School Investment Conference.

== Citron Research ==
Left started StockLemon.com in 2001 as a self-published blog containing reports on controversial companies. He rebranded the site as Citron Research in 2007. Left researches and short sells companies he believes to be engaged in fraud, have been suspiciously promoted, or have been mistakenly overpriced by the stock market.

According to a Wall Street Journal analysis of 111 Citron short-sale reports spanning from 2001 to 2014, there was an average share-price decline of 42 percent in the year after Left's report was released. Of those shares, 90 were lower one year later while 21 gained, according to data from S&P Capital IQ.

GTX Global Corp. sued Left for defamation after a 2005 article he published through Citron about GTX Global. In 2007, the case was dismissed under California's anti-SLAPP statutes which cover writings about publicly traded companies as matters of public interest.

In 2008, Left released a report in which he concluded that Home Solutions was not transparent about the company's relationship with American Renaissance. Home Solutions had loaned money to American Renaissance before the "partnership" was disclosed publicly. As a result of Left's research, Home Solutions’ stock plummeted. Starting in 2012, Left published multiple reports about Questcor Pharmaceuticals centered around incorrect labeling of the drug Acthar's ingredients. When Questcor was acquired by Mallinckrodt, Left criticized the new company for continued misconduct. Several of Left's reports have become highly publicized, including a 2012 report on the legality of operations by Nu Skin Enterprises, and a 2015 report on Valeant Pharmaceuticals bringing attention to inflated sales.

In October 2015, The Globe and Mail of Toronto, quoted independent research firm 5i Research Inc CEO Peter Hodson, as stating that "What they seem to do quite well is they're able to spin existing facts into a horrible scenario. It reads very badly," and that "Their job as a company is to create the most panic so they and their clients can make the most money."

Citron Research published a report on May 19, 2019, regarding African eCommerce company Jumia, one month after its IPO had resulted in shares values rising about 250 percent. Subsequent to the Citron report, stock value dropped by 50 percent in one week. Citron alleged “material discrepancies” between the IPO filing and a confidential presentation made by Jumia to its investors on October 18, 2018. Citron Research alleged that the company had presented incorrect figures concerning active users, specifically, its percentage of product returned and active customers before the IPO. By August 2019, Jumia was named in several class-action suits related to employee fraud.

In January 2021, Citron Research stated in an interview held by Andrew Left that the company has covered the majority of its short positions after the GameStop short squeeze in the $90s/share at a loss of 100%, now having a small manageable position. The Wall Street Journal reported Left being targeted online, including an incident where Left's social media accounts were hacked to text his children and used "threatening, profane and personal language".

=== Valeant Pharmaceuticals ===
Left's 2015 report on Valeant Pharmaceuticals (later known as Bausch Health) accused the company of channel stuffing and using sham transactions to inflate drug sales. Left's initial report focused on an investigation launched by Senator Bernie Sanders and Representative Elijah Cummings that examined Valeant's business model of massively spiking the prices of drugs to which it had acquired marketing rights. Left followed up with a report focused on pharmaceutical distributor Philidor RX. Left called for the US Securities and Exchange Commission to investigate the issue and referred to the company as the "Pharmaceutical Enron". As a result of the report, Valeant shares dropped after a five-year peak, eventually falling more than 90 percent from its peak in August 2015, and announced the resignation of longtime CEO J. Michael Pearson the following March.

=== Shopify ===
In October 2017, Left released a report calling Shopify "a business dirtier than Herbalife", claiming it overstated the amount of merchants using the e-commerce platform and described it as a "get-rich-quick" scheme in contravention of Federal Trade Commission regulations. The day the report was released, the stock plunged more than 11%. Left wrote another report about Shopify in April 2019, stating he believed Shopify's stock price would come down 50% in the next 12 months, and pledged to donate $200,000 to the Robin Hood Foundation if the stock price was trading over $200 by April 2020.. In January 2020, by which time Shopify's share price had increased to over $500, Left announced in his annual letter to investors that Citron Research had exited the short position. The reports did not lead to an investigation into Shopify by the FTC.

=== Citron's reports on Chinese companies ===
Citron Research has published reports on 18 Chinese companies, 16 of which experienced a drop in stock prices, with 15 of them experiencing drops of over 70%. This has caused a collective of Chinese business leaders, including Qihoo 360 CEO Zhou Hongyi (a company that has been targeted by Left), to launch a site called CitronFraud.com (no longer operating). Left sent a legal notice to the 60 Chinese executives involved, seeking an apology, and told Tech In Asia that he is consulting with lawyers and considering legal action in response.

Qihoo 360 has threatened to take legal action against Citron Research, as has former Google China chief Kai-Fu Lee, now the chairman and CEO of Innovation Works. In 2012, Lee posted a detailed, point-by-point rebuttal, via Sinocism, to Chinese investment platform Xueqiu.com, which also suggests that Citron had taken advantage of reader unfamiliarity with Chinese languages and markets. Lee stated that, "Since Citron has already made big bets on these recommendations before their reports are published... Citron’s recommendation doesn’t have to be right; Citron just needs to mislead their readers to follow their recommendations!”

==== Longtop Financial ====
In 2011, Left released a report through Citron about Longtop Financial, a financial software house based in China, accusing it of defrauding shareholdings, over-reporting revenues, and lacking transparency in the company's acquisition process. The report pointed out Longtop's outsized margins and unexplained stock grants and pointed out Longtop's relationship with China's largest banks. The company was later issued a Wells notice of impending criminal charges from the SEC.

==== Evergrande Group and Market Misconduct Tribunal sanction ====
In 2012, the Hong Kong Securities and Futures Commission commenced proceedings in the Market Misconduct Tribunal against Left, contending that he had spread false and misleading information about Evergrande Group in a report published that year on Citron Research's website. In that report, Left had alleged that Evergrande was insolvent and had consistently presented fraudulent information to the investing public.

In 2016, the Hong Kong Market Misconduct Tribunal (chaired by Justice Michael Hartmann) found that Left was culpable of market misconduct by publishing claims about Evergrande Group that were "false and/or misleading as to material facts or through the omission of material facts". Left was banned from trading for five years, ordered to repay around HK$1.6 million in trading profits and about HK$4 million in legal costs and expenses incurred by the SFC, and would face criminal prosecution if he breaks Hong Kong market misconduct rules again.

In 2019, the Hong Kong Court of Appeal dismissed Left's appeal against the decision of the Market Misconduct Tribunal. The Court of Appeal dismissed Left's application for leave to appeal to the Court of Final Appeal. On 8 July 2020, the Court of Final Appeal also dismissed Left's application for leave to appeal.

In 2021, Left's claims were shown to be correct as the Evergrande Group signaled that they will not be able to pay off the interest on $300 billion in liabilities, sparking a global market sell-off. Left was quoted as saying "I am not vindicated because I'm still banned."

== Legal cases ==
=== DOJ criminal indictment 2024 ===
On July 25, 2024, prosecutors with the United States Department of Justice issued a 19-count criminal indictment against Left, charging securities fraud and lying to federal investigators in United States vs. Andrew Left 24-cr-456 in U.S. District Court for the Central District of California (Los Angeles), although Judge Virginia A. Phillips dismissed the lying to investigators charge before the jury trial began in May 2026. Left allegedly took contrary trading positions to his public recommendations to reap quick profits off the stocks he promoted through Citron. A judge rejected an effort by Left to dismiss the charges in December 2025.

On June 1, 2026, Left was found guilty on 13 counts of fraud and other charges; he faces up to 25 years in prison for one count of securities-fraud scheme and up to 20 more for additional counts of securities fraud. Sentencing was scheduled for August 31, 2026. An appeal is anticipated, or a mistrial request owing to the jury having ruled on the dismissed charge along with active charges.

=== SEC civil lawsuit 2024 ===
On July 26, 2024, the U.S. Securities and Exchange Commission (SEC) filed a civil lawsuit against Andrew Left and Citron Capital, alleging fraud and illegal manipulation of the stock market. According to the SEC complaint, he allegedly engaged in a scheme that involved making public recommendations contrary to his private trading positions, which netted him some $20 million in illicit gains between 2018 and 2023. The SEC also accused that Left shared his planned announcements with at least two hedge funds in advance, receiving a portion of their trading profits in return.

In a response to the SEC allegations against his client, Left's lawyer said, "You have no duty to the market to disclose your private trading intentions."

== Personal life ==
Left has four children, two from his previous marriage. Left is married to his wife, Stephanie. He lives in Boca Raton, Florida.

== Philanthropy ==
In 2018, following the Stoneman Douglas High School shooting, Left created a scholarship for students of the school. The award provided five seniors per year between 2018 and 2021 a $10,000 scholarship.

== See also ==
- Kenneth Griffin
- James Chanos
