= Australians in Hong Kong =

Ethnic group in Hong Kong

Total population
- 100,000 (2017); 1.3% of the population

Languages
- Australian English · Cantonese · Mandarin

There are over 100,000 Australians in Hong Kong, with most being ethnic Chinese Australians or Hong Kong Australians. Many Hong Kong Australians, regardless of ethnic or national background, hold dual status of Australian citizenship and Hong Kong permanent residency — of which such Hong Kong permanent residents may or may not concurrently be nationals of the PRC. Australian business people are based in the territory, which is an important financial centre and is also seen as a gateway to the China market.

Australia has a Consulate-General in Hong Kong, located on the 23rd floor of Harbour Centre (海港中心) in Wan Chai. Australian Consulate-General Hong Kong. However, Chinese authorities treat dual nationals possessing Chinese nationality solely as Chinese nationals and bar them from receiving foreign consular assistance while in Chinese territory. A Hong Konger who acquires another nationality after the transfer of Hong Kong in 1997 retains Chinese nationality. Australian Hongkongers who are permanent residents of Hong Kong and nationals of the PRC are entitled to apply for the Hong Kong Special Administrative Region passport.

Following the central government's imposition of the Hong Kong national security law, which Australia regards as being in breach of the Hong Kong Basic Law, on 7 July the Australian government issued an official travel advisory warning travellers and Australian passport holders residing in Hong Kong, advising the latter group: "If you're concerned about the new law, reconsider your need to remain in Hong Kong." On 9 July 2020, Australia suspended its extradition agreement with Hong Kong, which had been in place since 1993. (There is no extradition agreement between Australia and mainland China.)

== Education ==
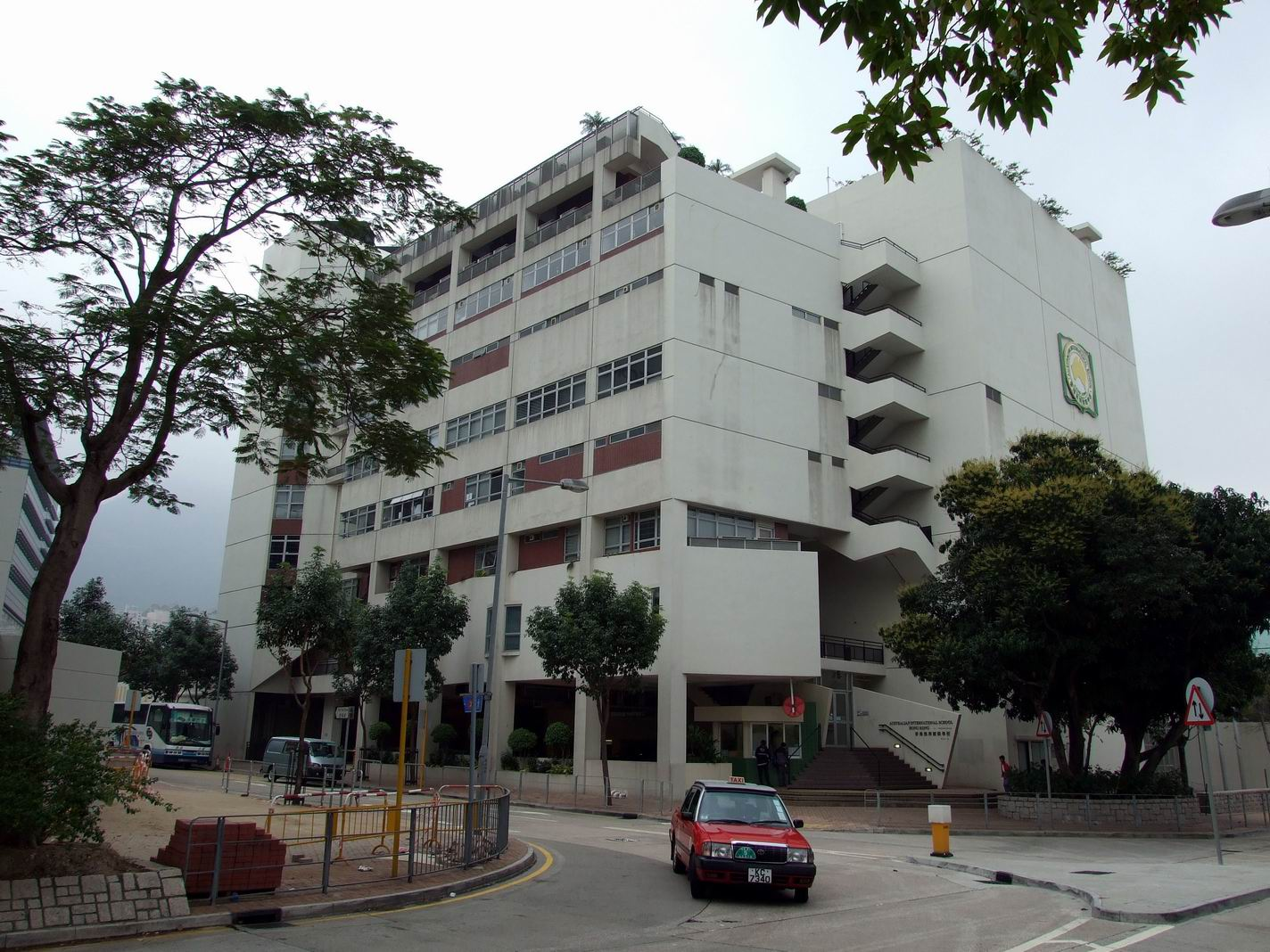
Australian International School Hong Kong

The Australian International School Hong Kong is a private, co-educational international school located in Kowloon, Hong Kong that was established to provide the demand for an Australian-based style of education to children from the years of preparatory to Year 12 and serves as one of the main secondary education providers for Australian expatriates living in the region. Established in 1995, the school's now permanent campus in Kowloon Tong has a primary curriculum centralised around the NSW Stage 4 and 5 syllabuses developed by the New South Wales Board of Studies for years 7–10 with students in Years 11 and 12 being offered the alternative between the NSW Higher School Certificate (HSC) or the internationally renowned IB Diploma Programme. More recently the Australian government and its representatives in Hong Kong take taken an increased interest in resident Hong Kong students being able to have access to Australian education. 130 formal educational agreements between Hong Kong and Australia were made in 2018 and included various student and staff exchanges, academic and research collaborations between institutions and study-abroad programmes. In 2013, Hong Kong was one of four host locations that agreed to participate in a trial phase of the New Colombo Plan. The New Colombo Plan, introduced by the Australian government in 2014, is an initiative premised around supporting Australian undergraduates to study abroad in the Indo-Pacific region and undertake internships in their region of residence. The Australian government estimated that the plan, by the end of 2021, would have supported over 2000 Australian undergraduates in fields including education, communications, engineering, health, urban design, science, and business, across the Hong Kong region.

== The Australian Consulate General in Hong Kong and Political standings ==
The Australian Consulate General of Hong Kong, informally known as the Australian Embassy, is located at 25 Harbour Road, Wan Chai, Hong Kong and acts as the formal representative of the Australian government in Hong Kong and for roughly "100,000 Australians living in Hong Kong" The embassy provides passport application services, notarial services, visa, and citizenship approval services and has departments dedicated to the Australian Trade Commission, international study, travel and work, and access to the Australian Federal Police. A complication arising from the Chinese nationality law is that Chinese authorities treat Chinese dual nationals, including Chinese/Australian dual nationals, solely as Chinese citizens, thus barring them from being able to receive international consular assistance while in Chinese territory.

The Chinese imposition of a broad national security law on Hong Kong has garnered a public response of concern from the Australian Government who have stated that it is seen as a breach of Hong Kong Basic Law. It has been expressed that the imposed National Security Law has and will continue to destroy basic democratic principles that have underpinned the society of Hong Kong and it's 'One Country, Two Systems' framework that was put into place after the region became a Special Administrative Region (SAR) in 1997. In addition to this, the Australian Government, in response to China's actions, posted an official travel advisory warning on 7 July 2020, to travellers and both current and prospective Australian passport holders residing in the region to reconsider the need to be in Hong Kong. Additionally, the Australian Government also took steps to indefinitely suspend the extradition treaty and agreement that it had held with Hong Kong since 1993 on 9 July 2020.

== Trade and Business ==
Australian trade within and to Hong Kong has remained a key priority the Australian government wants to uphold. (Australian Trade and Investment Commission, 2021) The Australian-Hong Kong Free Trade Agreement (A-HKFTA) allows for zero tariffs for Australian exporters and further allows Australian service providers and suppliers to have uncomplicated access into Hong Kong's growing services industry. Australia and Hong Kong's longstanding trade relationship is evidenced through Hong Kong being Australia's tenth largest merchandise export market in 2020 with goods exports being valued at approximately $7.2 billion AUD – featured exports include high-quality food and beverages to service Hong Kong's retail and hospitality sectors and include wines, seafood, beef and pork, fruit, and dairy. (Australian Department of Foreign Affairs and Trade, 2021) Australian service exports to Hong Kong were valued at approximately $1.9 billion AUD in the same period. Hong Kong holds Australia's largest commercial presence in the South-East with the Australian Chamber of Commerce in Hong Kong being Australia's largest offshore Chamber of Commerce.

Many Australians of Hong Kong/Chinese descent come to Hong Kong to study at local universities or on work assignments, and this is supplemented by the over 600 owned Australian businesses that operate in and out of the Hong Kong region. The territory of Hong Kong is considered an important financial center and traditionally has been seen as a gateway to China and other markets in the South-East. Due to this, the region has been seen as prime location for Australian companies to grow, develop and expand into Asia and therefore is often chosen as a test market for new products and as a distribution and logistics hub. A city of international diversity with English as a main language of cross-country business, many companies can increase efficiency through employing a highly capable multilingual workforce that is able to communicate in English, Mandarin and Cantonese. To continue to encourage growth for start-ups and early-stage companies, the Hong Kong Government has provided generous tax incentives and the utilisation of government bodies, such as Invest Hong Kong, the Technology Talent Admission Scheme (TechTAS) and The Hong Kong Trade Development Council (HKTDC) for small and medium enterprises (SMEs). On top of the aforementioned Australian Chamber of Commerce Hong Kong, Australian networking groups such as Support Australia can acts as umbrella groups that represent key Hong Kong-based Australian organizations in the region.

Considering the ethnic diversity and internationality of people and businesses in the region, some Australian expatriates, as with other Westerners, tend to be unaware and misinformed of typical Chinese forms of leadership and power relationship styles of management as they come from different cultural orientations. As a consequence, the probability for misunderstandings in gestures, actions in meetings and acts of courtesy increase. To account for this, some traditional businesses in the region have adapted to Western styles of leadership to brand themselves as more appealing for prospective Western employees and thus both Western expatriates and Chinese companies have undergone a process of intercultural adjustment in the world of business.

== Culture and The Australian Association of Hong Kong. ==
The Australian Association of Hong Kong (AAHK) is a community driven society that was founded in 1954 by a group of Australian expatriates in Hong Kong that aims to connect fellow expatriates and encourage friendship and the sharing of ideas and values. The society teaches new expats of what to expect in Hong Kong, how to interact with locals and how to understand the customs of the region without seeming offensive; the process of intercultural adjustment for expatriates is known to be a challenging one. Additionally, the society involves itself in events such as dragon boat racing, the incorporation of traditional Australian celebrations such as an Australia Day barbeque and by holding regular ball sports events whereby members can come and connect. Hong Kong's annual Dragon Boat Race in particular examples how Australian expats have embraced local culture and become a part of the wider Hong Kong community. This is a team sport and typically most boats contain twenty-two paddlers working together. The sport is a popular team event with many different categories, including professional, amateur, all men, all women, mixed, charity and local teams. Of particular note, there are many cancer survivor teams such as breast cancer women's teams and prostate cancer men teams, all raising money for research and overall moral for the survivors. The Australian Association of Hong Kong has their own team, accrediting over sixty people participating in the event in 2019, making up 3 teams of men's, women's and mixed. The association also notes that many make it a social event, sitting on the sidelines and barracking for their favourites is accompanied with barbecues and fully catered services, making it a day out for the whole family and friends to enjoy.

Members have described the association as a supportive network for Australians relocating to Hong Kong. The organization participates in regional cultural activities, such as entering multiple teams into annual dragon boat races, a popular event among Australian expatriates. Additionally, the institute provides orientation to local customs and social expectations in Hong Kong. Social interactions can involve distinct cultural etiquette; for example, while bowing is a traditional greeting among some East Asian communities, a handshake is typically considered the appropriate greeting for Westerners in business and formal context sin Hong Kong.

== Cuisine and Australian Restaurants in Hong Kong ==
Several Australian owned restaurants, cafes and coffee shops operate in the Hong Kong region with some incorporating elements of what is typically considered modern Australian cuisine into their menus. An example of this is the breakfast and coffee shop culture that many in the Australian community in Hong Kong are familiar with – a number of coffee shops have been set-up to offer an authentic Australian coffee shop experience while tending to offer some fusion with the local cuisine. 'Brew Bros' located at 3 Hill Road, Shek Tong Tsui, describes itself as the epitome of an authentic Australian coffee and Australian egg and bacon roll experience. Other dishes touted as Australian suburban favourites such as a typical chicken store are imitated by restaurants such as 'Chicken on the Run' which is located within the shopping complex at 1, Prince's Terrace, Hong Kong. More upmarket dining experiences that have derived influence from Australian cuisine include 'Hue', the brainchild of Australian Chef Anthony Hammel, that combines gourmet flavour and modern Australian taste. The 'Hue' website suggest that diners should "expect elegance and interesting flavours that will keep you coming back for more" and that the entire restaurant is the very best of "… a culinary showcase of modern Australian (cuisine) by Executive Chef Anthony Hammel" . Specific dishes include a twist on the classic Australian beetroot salad with goats curd and smoked eel, Australian raw Mayura Wagyu with nori crisp and yuzukosho cream, and slow cooked lamb shoulder dressed with smoked yogurt and green harissa .

== Sporting Culture ==
Horse racing and other equestrian sports and events is also of cultural importance to the Australian expat community with the Australian Jockeys Association: Hong Kong being a key supporter of the sport in the region. The 2008 Olympic Equestrian events in Hong Kong, also saw great success for the Australian Eventing team, with team members Lucinda Fredericks, Sonja Johnson, Megan Jones, Clayton Fredericks and Shane Rose, alongside coach Wayne Roycroft taking home the silver medal.

Australian Rules Football (AFL) is also quite popular for Australian expats and the general public in Hong Kong with the Hong Kong Dragons, one of the South-East's first AFL clubs that was established in 1990, currently boasting a membership of 50-60 players. The Dragons also have many social events throughout the year with their AFL Final Luncheon usually attracting well over 300 patrons. The club encourages having a mix of Australian expats and local Chinese players, and has teams of men's professionals, mixed amateur adults down to kids. The Australian fixation on rugby and football has travelled with expatriates as they migrate to Hong Kong, with many Australians also travelling to Hong Kong each year solely to watch sporting matches and support Australian teams.

The Hong Kong Rugby Sevens tournament, first held in 1975, is another popular sporting event among Australians in Hong Kong that takes place annually in either late March or early April, and is the seventh event of the World Series calendar. Rugby Union is a heavily followed sport in Australia and the tournament in Hong Kong has swiftly become the "biggest sports event in Asia". The Australian Rugby Sevens men and women's team have both seen considerable success, notably the Australians women's teams winning Gold at the Rio Olympics. Both teams have a grand following of loyal fans and many Australians, including ex-pats and visitors turn out to cheer on their team during this special event. However, more recently the special event has become more than just a sporting fixture, with the Hong Kong tourism board striving to make it more of an unmissable social event. Vittachi calls it the 'annual weekend party' highlighting the festivals visitors eager entrance to clubs, pubs and many social gatherings, after a day of watching the rugby. Many young Australians travel to Hong Kong for the event, as part of their 'backpacking' travels and engage in culture throughout. Many Australians also take up the fun aspect of dressing up in costume for the Hong Kong sevens tournament. Such costumes include famous Australian lifeguards, Australian children television icons bananas in pyjamas, famous Australian politicians and even the Australian flag are all part of the fun. Overall, the Hong Kong Rugby Sevens tournament is must see for many Australians living in Hong Kong and also for the many Australians visitors that travel to the country for great entertainment.

== Notable people ==
- Brad Turvey - former model and TV host in the Philippines
- Anjali Rao - journalist & TV news program host
- Joyce Godenzi - former actress
- Corinna Chamberlain - singer and actress
- Vivien Tan - former model, 1-time actress in British-Australian TV series The Other Side of Paradise, former Channel [V] VJ, and present TV host, chef and entrepreneur (born to Australian mother, grew up in Hong Kong)
- Anna Coren - journalist and news hist in CNN Asia-Pacific.
- Gregory Charles Rivers

== See also ==
- Australian diaspora
- Australians in China
- Australians in India
- Australians in the United Kingdom
- Australian rules football in Asia#Hong Kong
- Hong Kong Australians
- Australia–Hong Kong relations
- Hong Kong returnee

== Bibliography ==
- Quanguo Renmin Daibiao Dahui Changwu Weiyuanhui Guanyu "Zhonghua Renmin Gongheguo Guoji Fa" Zai Aomen Tebie Xingzhengqu Shishi De Ji Ge Wenti De Jieshi (全國人民代表大會常務委員會關於《中華人民共和國國籍法》在澳門特別行政區實施的幾個問題的解釋) [Interpretation by the Standing Committee of the National People's Congress on Some Questions Concerning Implementation of the Nationality Law of the People's Republic of China in the Macao Special Administrative Region - (adopted 29 December 1998, effective 20 December 1999) (China)
- Quanguo Renmin Daibiao Dahui Changwu Weiyuanhui Guanyu "Zhonghua Renmin Gongheguo Guoji Fa" Zai Xianggang Tebie Xingzhengqu Shishi De Ji Ge Wenti De Jieshi (全國人民代表大會常務委員會關於《中華人民共和國國籍法》在香港特別行政區實施的幾個問題的解釋) Interpretation by the Standing Committee of the National People's Congress on Some Questions Concerning Implementation of the Nationality Law of the People's Republic of China in the Hong Kong Special Administrative Region (adopted 15 May 1996, effective 1 July 1997) (China)
