= Maggie Yang =

Hong Kong prosecutor

Maggie Yang JP
- 楊美琪

Director of Public Prosecutions
- In office 13 August 2021 – 20 May 2026
- Preceded by: David Leung
- Succeeded by: Anthony Chau Tin-hang

Personal details
- Education: University of Wales

Maggie Yang Mei-kei JP (Chinese: 楊美琪) is a Hong Kong barrister and civil servant who served as Director of Public Prosecutions of Hong Kong (DPP) from 2021 to 2026, becoming the first woman to be appointed to the role. She is also the first post-Handover DPP not to have taken silk at the time of appointment.

== Early life and education ==
Yang attended the University of Wales and graduated in 1989.

== Career ==
Yang was admitted as a solicitor in England and Wales in 1992, and in Hong Kong in 1993. She joined the Prosecutions Division of the then-Legal Department as a crown counsel the following year, and was successively promoted to senior crown counsel in 1996, deputy principal government counsel in 2012 and principal government counsel in 2019, spending most of her career as a prosecutor, except for a short stint in the Civil Division.

In 2019, Yang was appointed deputy director of prosecutions, and later served as the lead prosecutor in the Hong Kong 47 case, in which 47 pro-democracy politicians were prosecuted on national security charges for participating in an unofficial primary election. She acted as director in rotation with deputy director William Tam after the resignation of David Leung, who left the Department of Justice in December 2020 after a conflict with Secretary for Justice Teresa Cheng.

=== Director of Public Prosecutions ===
Yang was formally made Director of Public Prosecutions on 13 August 2021, shortly after being called to the Bar in July 2021 following a 3-month pupillage under Anthony Houghton SC. Had she remained a solicitor at the time of her appointment, she would have become the first solicitor to be appointed DPP. The U.S. Congressional-Executive Commission on China recommended in July 2022 that Yang be sanctioned for her leading role in political prosecutions.

Speaking on an RTHK television programme on 23 April 2023, Yang said that "words are weapons" in relation to the national security law, and that if one's speech led other people to commit national security offences, it would be "impossible for them to be unscathed by the law".

After 32 years in government service, Yang retired from the Department of Justice on 20 May 2026 and was succeeded as director of public prosecutions by Anthony Chau.

Legal offices
Preceded by David Leung	Director of Public Prosecutions of Hong Kong; 2021-present	Succeeded by Incumbent
