= Anthony Chau Tin-hang =

Hong Kong barrister and prosecutor

- 周天行
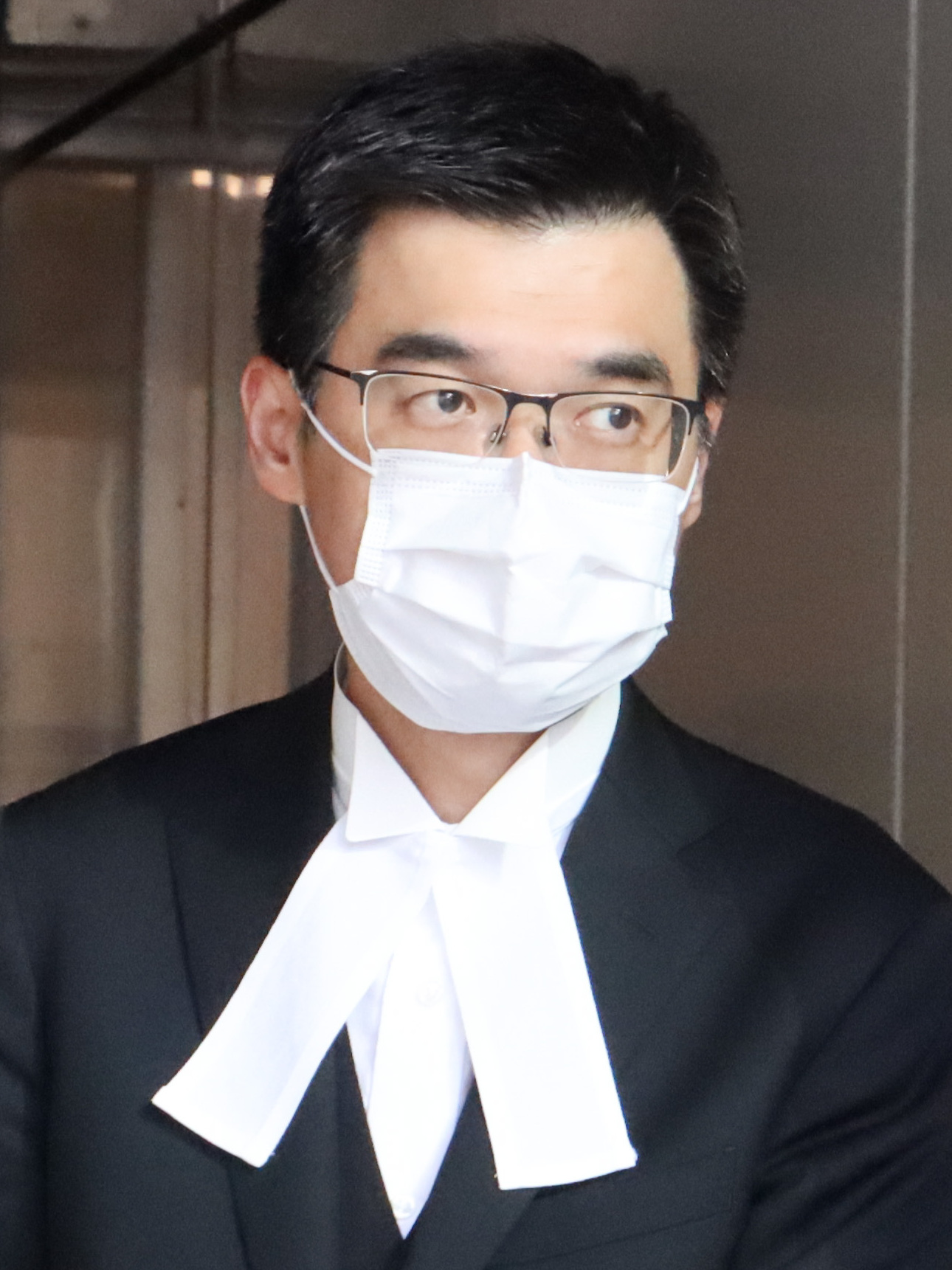
- Chau in 2021

Director of Public Prosecutions
- Incumbent
- Assumed office 21 May 2026
- Secretary for Justice: Paul Lam
- Preceded by: Maggie Yang

Deputy Director of Public Prosecutions (Technology Crime)
- In office July 2023 – 20 May 2026
- Secretary for Justice: Paul Lam
- Preceded by: Position established

Personal details
- Occupation: Prosecutor
- Profession: Barrister

Anthony Chau Tin-hang is a Hong Kong barrister who has served as the director of public prosecutions of Hong Kong since May 2026.

Before becoming Hong Kong's chief prosecutor, Chau successively served as Deputy Director of Public Prosecutions for technology crime from July 2023 to May 2026, and acting deputy director of public prosecutions (special duties) until May 2023, a role that gave him responsibility for prosecuting many protest-related cases. He also briefly served as the deputy director of public prosecutions (higher courts) from May 2023 to July 2023, between the disbandment of the Special Duties sub-division and the establishment of the Technology Crime sub-division.

Chau has been a prosecutor since at least 2008 and became a senior public prosecutor in 2010, handling magistracy appeals in the High Court. He was a solicitor before being called to the Bar in February 2026, following a shortened pupillage.

== Cases ==
=== Jimmy Lai trial ===
On Christmas Eve in December 2020, Chau filed an urgent appeal with the Court of Final Appeal and argued that Jimmy Lai should be denied bail and sent back to jail, saying that the threshold for bail in cases around the National Security Law should be high. Chau also argued that people who can commit future offenses without special conditions should not be eligible for release. Additionally, Chau said that he would be willing to fight a court battle over the issue, including on public holidays.

Chau also argued that Lai gave media interviews which "proved" collusion with foreign forces. In response, the judge disagreed and said that "The statements in question on their face appear to be comments and criticisms rather than requests, albeit one might find those views disagreeable or even offensive."

In September 2022, Chau said that he would try his best to include evidence found on Lai's cellphone, and asked Lai's defence team to "not complain about the last-minute filing" of the evidence.

In November 2022, Chau filed an application to delay Lai's trial until after the NPCSC decision on blocking the hiring of foreign lawyers such as Tim Owen in national security cases. Chau claimed to the court that the NPCSC may also ban foreign lawyers from giving advice to clients. Chau also said the prosecution may further delay the trial if the NPCSC does not rule on the issue before the start of the trial, with one of the judges saying that it would be unfair to Lai if Chau keeps delaying the trial.

On 13 December 2022, Chau filed another application to delay the case until 3 January 2023, until after the NPCSC was expected to rule in the matter. As Xinhua reported on 30 December 2022, the NPCSC ruled in favor of the Hong Kong government by granting the chief executive the power to bar foreign lawyers from national security cases.

In January 2025, Lai replied to Chau's accusations that Lai was anti-China, saying "Truth seems to have no bearing on you, Mr Chau... You're so free. You're creative. You're great as a prosecutor."

=== Apple Daily and Next Digital ===
In November 2022, 6 senior staff members of Apple Daily and Next Digital pleaded guilty to taking part in national security offenses. Chau argued that Apple Daily was used to advocate for foreign sanctions on Hong Kong, and said "The impugned content took the form of, among others, articles purported to be news coverage of current issues, commentary articles, and appeals or propaganda directly and unlawfully advocating political agenda."

=== Yuen Long attack ===
Chau is also the lead prosecutor for the 2019 Yuen Long attack. In February 2021, judge Eddie Yip expressed frustration with Chau, who repeatedly complained that Chau glossed over important details, such as who started the attack; Chau eventually admitted that those in white were the ones who started the attack. The judge also complained that Chau's timeline of events felt like an "edited film" and was confusing. Chau also described the incident as a "physical collision," to which the judge remarked "What does 'physical collision' mean? Playing bumper cars?"

In addition, when Yip requested the name and title of the officer responsible for the incident from Chau, Chau told Yip that he would submit it in writing. In response, Yip requested that Chau directly inform him and said "because it’s an open trial, we don't pass notes."

=== Chan Tze-wah ===
Chau also represents the prosecution for a case against Chan Tze-wah, who has been accused by the government of conspiring to collude with foreign forces. Chan is charged with having assisted Andy Li attempt to flee from Hong Kong to Taiwan by boat.

=== Tong Ying-kit ===
Tong Ying-kit is the first person charged under the National Security Law. On 1 July 2020, he was accused of driving his motorcycle into police while flying a flag that stated "Liberate Hong Kong, Revolution of Our Times". Chau represented the prosecution, and argued that Tong drove his motorcycle past four police checkpoints despite multiple warnings not to do so, which amounted to Tong committing "terrorism".

In July 2021, Chau asked defence expert Francis Lee from the Chinese University whether his research into the "Liberate Hong Kong, Revolution of Our Times" slogan was reliable, asking if his focus group participants were really telling the truth or lying. Chau also said that Lee's research was "unreliable and irrelevant". Chau called on a historian, Lau Chi-pang, who claimed to the court that the slogan meant overthrowing the regime.

Chau also argued that Tong's flag would have posed a "serious threat" to road safety if it had detached from his motorcycle.

In April 2021, the judges suggested that Chau's interpretation of "terrorism" was too broad, and that Tong's actions did not necessarily cause or intend harm on a broad level against society.

=== Koo Sze-yiu ===
In a case against Koo Sze-yiu, Chau argued that the Chinese Communist Party is the "constitutional foundation" to the Basic Law, and also argued that freedom of speech is not absolute.

=== 612 Humanitarian Relief Fund ===
Chau also argued that the 612 Humanitarian Relief Fund, with members such as Cardinal Joseph Zen, should have registered as a society, and that doing so would not infringe on freedom of association. In addition, Chau argued that the Societies Ordinance was enacted to safeguard national security.

=== Hong Kong 47 ===
In February 2023, Chau argued of pan-democrats who were trying to win seats in the Legislative Council that "the conspiracy would have been carried out to fruition and the provision of public services essential to the operation and stability of the HKSAR and the livelihoods of the people of the HKSAR would have been gravely affected."

In May 2023, Chau revealed that the prosecution team would use a common law offence as a basis, which the judges questioned and asked Chau why it took them so long to do so, with one judge saying "You have been sitting on this case for 2.5 years."

== Views ==
=== Bail ===
In February 2021, Chau told the Court of Final Appeal that the default position the government should hold is that those suspected of breaking the national security law should not be granted bail. The prosecution team also argued that those suspected of breaking the national security law should be denied bail, similar to the way murderers are.

=== Deterrent ===
Chau also argued that cases under the national security law must have a deterrent effect.

=== Minimum sentencing ===
In October 2022, Chau asked for an additional week for the case against Lui Sai-yu to research on whether the national security law prescribes a mandatory minimum jail sentence, while Lui's lawyer argued that it was only a suggested length of time.

== Sanctions ==
In July 2022, the United States' Congressional-Executive Commission on China recommended that Chau be sanctioned by the US government for his work in prosecuting people under the national security law.

== Allegations ==
In May 2026, the social activist Frances Hui alleged that Chau had an inappropriate relationship with his subordinate, exploiting public funds to go to five-star hotels with her and give her favorable career positions. Hong Kong authorities condemned Hui, calling the allegations "unfounded" and "ill-intentioned," with the Department of Justice (DoJ) referring the defamation case to police and defending Chau.

Hui claimed exclusive knowledge that Chau used the police to reserve rooms for him and his subordinate at The Murray hotel, as well as allowing her to play roles in the Securities and Futures Commission's trial against Segantii Capital Management and HKSAR v Lai Chee Ying & Others. Hui alleged that Chau's predecessor as Director of Public Prosecutions, Maggie Yang, knew of Chau's abuse.

The DoJ acknowledged that a previous complaint had been found to be without merit. Deputy Secretary for Justice Horace Cheung confirmed that Secretary for Justice Paul Lam internally called on DoJ staff to report the sources of the allegations and warned the media against enquiring about the matter.
