= Market Misconduct Tribunal =

Hong Kong securities regulation body

- Established: 2003
- Jurisdiction: Hong Kong
- Location: Hong Kong
- Appeals to: Court of Appeal
- Website: http://www.mmt.gov.hk

Market Misconduct Tribunal
- Traditional Chinese: 市場失當行為審裁處
- Simplified Chinese: 市场失当行为审裁处
Transcriptions
Standard Mandarin
- Hanyu Pinyin: Shìchǎng Shīdàng Xíngwéi Shěn Cáichǔ
Yue: Cantonese
- Jyutping: si5 coeng4 sat1 dong3 hang4 wai4 sam2 coi4 cyu3

The Market Misconduct Tribunal (Chinese: 市場失當行為審裁處) is an independent body in Hong Kong which is established under the Securities and Futures Ordinance (Cap. 571) (SFO), and is chaired by a judge or former judge of the High Court who sits with two members.

== Background ==
The Market Misconduct Tribunal (MMT) was established in 2003 under the provisions contained in the SFO. In accordance with the SFO, if it appears to the Securities and Futures Commission (SFC) that market misconduct or a breach of a disclosure requirement under Part XIVA of the SFO has or may have taken place, the SFC may institute proceedings before the MMT. The MMT has jurisdiction to hear and determine any question or issue arising out of or in connection with the proceedings instituted under the SFO.

Market misconduct includes insider dealing, false trading, price rigging, stock market manipulation, disclosure of information about prohibited transactions and disclosure of false or misleading information inducing transactions in securities and futures contracts. Such conduct is detrimental to the interests of investors and damages the reputation of Hong Kong as an international financial centre. In accordance with the SFO, if it appears to the SFC that market misconduct or a breach of a disclosure requirement under Part XIVA of the SFO has or may have taken place, the SFC may institute proceedings before the MMT. The MMT conducts civil proceedings and, where appropriate, imposes civil sanctions against those it determines to be wrongdoers. It helps promote market confidence by protecting the interests of the investing public and reducing market malpractice.

== Chairmen ==
The Chairman of the MMT is appointed by the Chief Executive on the recommendation of the Chief Justice. In its proceedings, the chairman sits with two members who are prominent members of Hong Kong's business and professional community appointed by the Financial Secretary under the authority delegated by the Chief Executive. Every sitting of the MMT must be held in public unless the MMT considers, in the interests of justice, that a sitting (or any part of it) should be held in private. The following judges are currently appointed as Chairmen of the MMT:

- Michael Hartmann
- Michael Lunn
- Ian McWalters

== Notable cases ==
- AcrossAsia Limited
- Asia Telemedia Limited
- CITIC Pacific Limited
- China Gas Holdings Limited
- Dickson Concepts and Sir Dickson Poon
- Evergrande Real Estate Group Limited and Andrew Left
- Water Oasis Group Limited
