= David Leung =

Hong Kong barrister (born 1966)

David Leung SC
- 梁卓然

Director of Public Prosecutions
- In office 29 December 2017 – 31 December 2020
- Preceded by: Keith Yeung
- Succeeded by: William Tam, SC (acting); Maggie Yang

Personal details
- Born: December 15, 1966 (age 59) Hong Kong
- Spouse: Ng Wing-huen 吳榮軒
- Education: University of Hong Kong (LLB, PCLL)

David Leung Cheuk-yin
- Chinese: 梁卓然
Transcriptions
Standard Mandarin
- Hanyu Pinyin: Liáng Zhuórán
- Wade–Giles: Liang Chuoh-jan
Yue: Cantonese
- Jyutping: loeng4 coek3 jin4

David Leung Cheuk-yin SC (Chinese: 梁卓然, born on 15 December 1966) is a Hong Kong barrister who served as the sixth Director of Public Prosecutions of Hong Kong.

== Early life and career ==
He was educated at the University of Hong Kong, before becoming a solicitor in 1992. He joined the Prosecutions Division of the Department of Justice in 1995, and subsequently was called to the Hong Kong Bar in 1998 and held a number of senior roles in the Division, including serving as Deputy Director of Public Prosecutions in 2012. He became a Senior Counsel in 2015.

== Director of Public Prosecutions ==
On 29 December 2017, Leung was appointed Director of Public Prosecutions. He was described by Rimsky Yuen, SC, the Secretary for Justice at the time, as “the in-house expert on the law relating to public order events … and cost matters”. Leung was involved in a number of high-profile prosecutions, including those around the 2014 Hong Kong protests, 2016 Mong Kok civil unrest, and the legality of Uber's operation in Hong Kong.

In July 2020, Leung resigned from the Department of Justice, citing differences with his minister, Justice Secretary Teresa Cheng, and stated that he had been excluded from handling national security cases. Despite leading some prosecutions, he was seen by pro-Beijing politicians and the police as being too cautious to charge some protesters. He left office on 31 December 2020.

== Later career ==
After leaving the Department of Justice in 2020, Leung was appointed to sit as a Deputy High Court Judge for six months from 4 October 2021 to March 2022, but the appointment was rescinded by Chief Justice Andrew Cheung in September 2021. Leung had previously unsuccessfully sought to become a District Court judge. Given Leung's seniority and the convention that retired DPPs be appointed High Court judges after leaving office, it was speculated in local media that the cancellation of the appointment was due to the numerous controversies that arose during his tenure. Sing Tao Daily and the Bastille Post cited the ongoing furore over the miscarriage of justice in the Ma Ka-kin case as a contributing factor.

Following Leung's lack of success in joining the bench, there was speculation that he would enter private practice as a barrister, as a member of Bernacchi Chambers. It was later reported by Sing Tao Daily that Leung had joined Liberty Chambers as a tenant after serving a 3-month pupillage at Temple Chambers.

== Controversy ==
=== District Court trial ===
In mid 2005, Leung was sued by university classmate and barrister Kevin Hon, with the trial lasting 8 days across 3 months in front of District Court Judge Marlene Ng May-ling (now a High Court Judge). During judgement in 2006, Judge Ng commented that Leung was "unconvincing", that she was "not persuaded that Leung's contention is reliable", and that his reasoning was a "poor attempt to justify his repudiatory decision to unilaterally pull out of the Investment". The case number was DCCJ3619/2002; Leung lost and was ordered to pay over HK$400,000 in damages to Hon. Leung did not appeal the case.

=== 2019–20 Hong Kong Protests ===
In August 2019, a group of "at least 5" prosecutors (of which Leung is head) alleged that he had been "trampled" by the Secretary for Justice Teresa Cheng and failed in his gatekeeping role. They said that he often only gave prepared answers to media when responding to controversial issues and did not stabilize the morale of prosecutors.

Also in August 2019, a group of 3000 legal sector workers led by Dennis Kwok, and including legal heavyweights such as Denis Chang QC SC, demanded a face-to-face meeting with Cheng and Leung over alleged politically motivated prosecutions.

In September 2019, William Wong, the Chairman of the Court Prosecutors Association, wrote to Cheng and Leung and urged them to speak out against allegedly political arrests by the police.

On 31 July 2020, a recent email from Leung to his colleagues became public in which he said that he had tendered his resignation. In the email, Leung revealed that he had been sidelined by Secretary of Justice Teresa Cheng in matters of the national security law.

== Personal life ==
Leung's wife is also a senior prosecutor.

Legal offices
Preceded by Keith Yeung	Director of Public Prosecutions of Hong Kong; 2017–2020	Succeeded by William Tam, SC (acting); Maggie Yang
