= Sam Chui =

Australian media personality (born 1980)

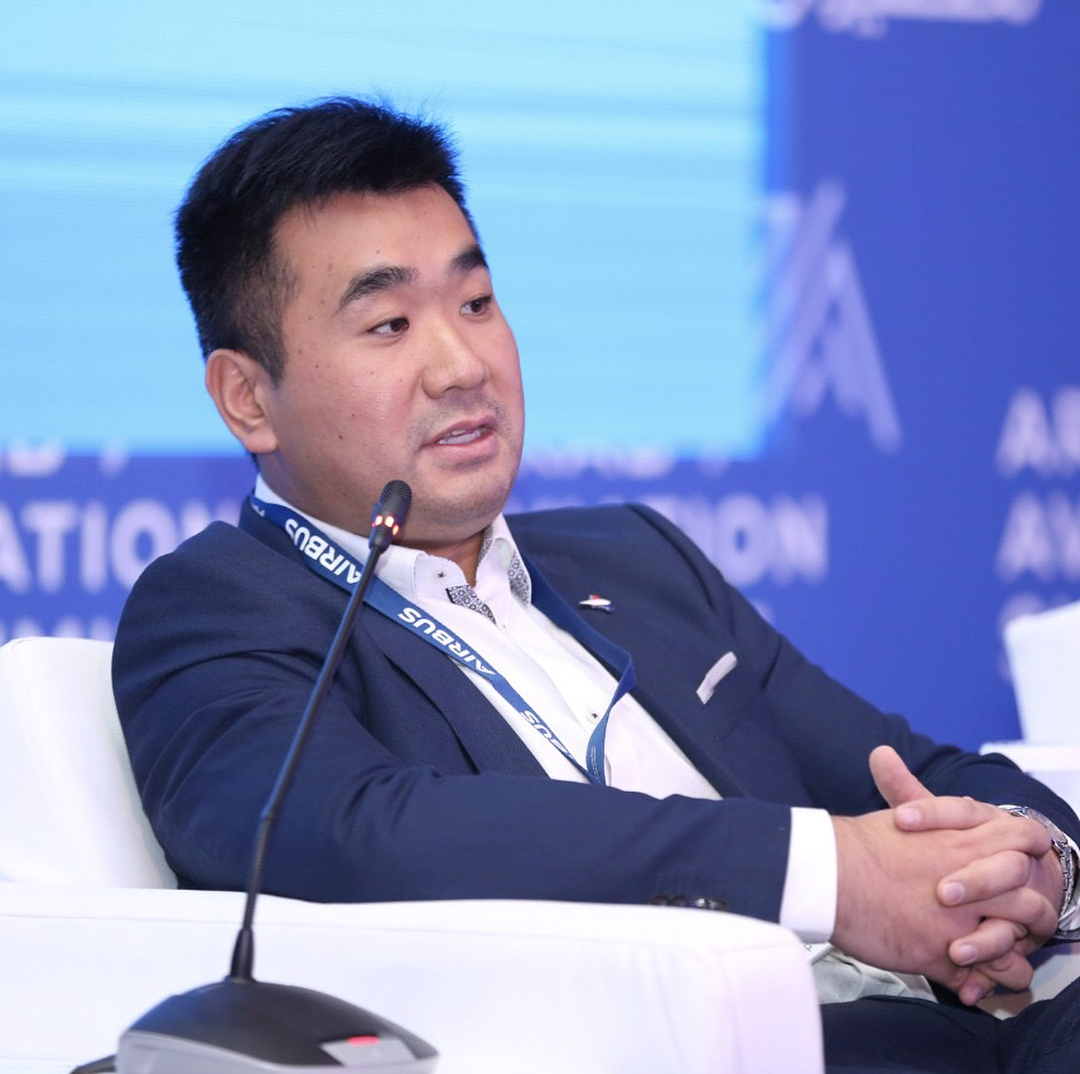
- Chui in 2017
- Born: 7 November 1980 (age 45); China
- Education: University of New South Wales (BCom)
- Occupations: Author; photographer; vlogger
- Years active: 1999–present

Instagram information
- Page: samchui
- Followers: 976 thousand

X information
- Handle: @SamChuiPhotos
- Followers: 52.9 thousand

YouTube information
- Channel: Sam Chui
- Years active: 2007–present
- Genres: Aviation; luxury travel; vlogs
- Subscribers: 3.88 million
- Views: 1.07 billion
- Last updated: 17 June 2026
- Website: samchui.com

Sam Chui
- Chinese: 崔佳星
Transcriptions
Standard Mandarin
- Hanyu Pinyin: Cuī Jiāxīng
Yue: Cantonese
- Jyutping: ceoi1 gaai1 sing1

Sam Chui (/ˈtʃuːiː/ CHOO-ee; Chinese: 崔佳星; born 7 November 1980) is an Australian aviation and travel vlogger, photographer, and author.

== Early life ==
Sam Chui was born on 7 November 1980, in China. When he was a child, his parents moved to Hong Kong. While growing up, Chui says he often visited Hong Kong's former airport, Kai Tak Airport, and watched planes land.

== Career ==
In 1999, Chui started a website, publishing photos of aircraft. It has since expanded to include current events regarding aviation. Chui is known for overhead pictures of Los Angeles International Airport captured from helicopters.

In 2019, Chui was invited onto a private Boeing 747SP owned previously by the Qatari Royal Family, and he flew from Hamilton, Ontario, to Marana, Arizona, as the only passenger. In 2019, he flew from Rome to Tel-Aviv on board the last El Al Boeing 747 flight.

Chui has a keen interest in the Boeing 747. He has logged over a million miles on 279 flights on the 747 and he has flown on every commercial variant of the 747 across 37 operators around the world. His first flight on a Boeing 747 was in 1993 onboard United Airlines Flight 800 from Hong Kong to Tokyo Narita. Chui has flown on more than 240 airlines and 180 aircraft types, including the Concorde between New York and London, a glacier landing in New Zealand, and the world's longest non-stop flight from Singapore to Newark. He was the only passenger aboard a privately owned Boeing 787 Dreamliner. In July 2021, he received his private pilot license in the United States.

He has also worked for the National Business Aviation Association (NBAA) to publish highlights from the 2021 NBAA Business Aviation Convention & Exhibition (NBAA-BACE).

== Incidents ==
In 2022, it was reported by several Nepalese online media that Chui was allowed into the cockpit by Nepal Airlines Chief Pilot Vijaya Lama during the flight to Kathmandu, violating safety laws. Nepalese Civil Aviation Authorities started an investigation. Lama denied these claims in an interview later.

In May 2023, Chui was suspected of violating Taiwan's Aircraft Flight Operation Regulations due to photos and videos of him inside the flight deck on a Starlux inaugural flight from Taipei to Los Angeles. The plane was piloted by Starlux founder and chair Chang Kuo-wei and he faced a fine of 60,000 NT$ due to the safety violation.

== Personal life ==
On 12 July 2025, Chui married his wife Fiona Pang on a Boeing 747-400 at Fujairah International Airport (FJR), flying a round-trip journey over the Gulf of Oman.

== Books ==
Title	Publisher	Publication year	ISBN
Air 1 – Sam Chui Air Photos	Zkoob Limited	2008	ISBN 978-9881750006
Air 2 – Aviation Photos and Flight Reports	Pixelium Company	2012	ISBN 9789889918651
Air 3 – Aviation Photos and Flight Experiences	Astral Horizon Aviation Press	2014	ISBN 978-9881370907
Air 747: Experiencing the Passion: Boeing's Jumbo Jet	Astral Horizon Aviation Press	2020	ISBN 9780993260490
