= Consulate General of Australia, Hong Kong =

Consular representation of Australia in the People's Republic of China

Australian Consul General to Hong Kong
- Coat of Arms of Australia

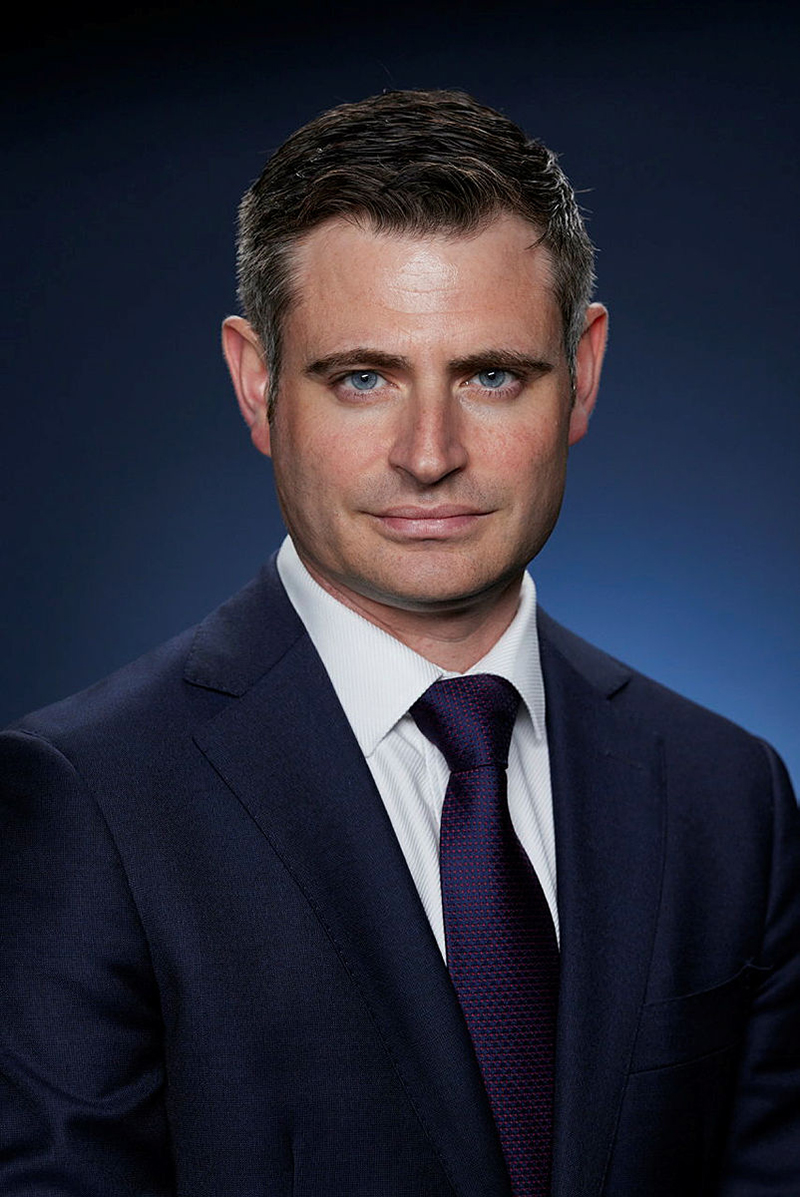
- Incumbent; Gareth Williams since 2 November 2023
- Style: His Excellency
- Residence: Hong Kong
- Appointer: Governor General of Australia
- Inaugural holder: Reginald Hazzard (Trade Commissioner)
- Formation: 1946
- Website: Australian Consulate General Hong Kong

Consulate General of Australia, Hong Kong
- Traditional Chinese: 澳洲駐香港總領事館
- Simplified Chinese: 澳洲驻香港总领事馆
Transcriptions
Standard Mandarin
- Hanyu Pinyin: Àozhōu zhù Xiānggǎng Zǒnglǐngshìguǎn
Yue: Cantonese
- Yale Romanization: Ou jāu jyu Hēung glng júng líhng sih gún
- Jyutping: Ou3 zau1 zyu3 Hoeng1 gong2 zung2 ling5 si6 gun2

The Australian Consulate General Hong Kong represents the Commonwealth of Australia in Hong Kong, and is also accredited to Macau. As Hong Kong was linked to the Commonwealth during British administration, Australia's diplomatic presence was exercised by an Australian Commission, until 1 January 1986, when it was renamed the Australian Consulate-General. From 1946 to 1972, Australia was represented by the Australian Trade Commission.

Due to Hong Kong and Macau having the status of Special Administrative Regions of the People's Republic of China, the Australian Consulate-General in Hong Kong reports directly to the Department of Foreign Affairs and Trade (DFAT) in Canberra, Australia, rather than to or through the Australian Embassy in Beijing.

The Consulate General is located on the 23rd floor of Harbour Centre (海港中心) in Wan Chai.

== History ==
An Australian Trade Commission in Hong Kong was originally signposted by the Australian Government of Joseph Lyons in the early 1930s. On 30 August 1933 the Minister for Commerce, Frederick Stewart, secured Cabinet approval for the establishment of several Trade Commissions in the East, with Batavia and Hong Kong being the most likely locations. However a decision to appoint a commissioner was delayed pending the report of Attorney General and Minister for External Affairs John Latham's fact-finding mission to the Far East, which found a dire need for Australian trade representative to improve mercantile connections in the region. While in Hong Kong, Latham was impressed by the representations from the Australian community there of "the wretched lack of coordination in the shipping services from Australia."

However, the Trade Commission was not established until 1946. This served to represent Australian interests in Hong Kong in the absence of a formal diplomatic post. However, the Department of External Affairs had offices within the Trade Commission.

In 1972, the Trade Commission was upgraded and renamed the Australian Commission, which allowed the office to undertake various semi-diplomatic and consular functions. This change meant that the Commission was no longer under the purview of the Department of Trade and Industry and was now the responsibility of the Department of Foreign Affairs.

From 1 January 1986, the Commission was renamed the Consulate-General, bringing it into line with other Australian missions elsewhere, with Penny Wensley as the first Consul General. By contrast, other Commonwealth countries, such as Singapore, continued to style their missions Commissions until the transfer of sovereignty to the People's Republic of China in 1997.

In August 1996, prior to the transfer of sovereignty, Australian Foreign Minister Alexander Downer, and Chinese Foreign Minister Qian Qichen, signed an agreement on the continuation of Australia's presence in Hong Kong in the form of a Consulate General after 1 July 1997.

In February 2020, Deputy Consul General Ryan Neelam was made the acting Consul General.

In October 2020, Elizabeth Ward was announced as Australia's new Consul General to Hong Kong following visa delays, which was attributed to political tensions between Australia and China. The official residence of the Consul General at Deep Water Bay was burgled, however nothing was reportedly stolen.

== Office-holders ==
=== Trade Commissioners, 1946–1972 ===
Name	Start of term	End of term	Notes
Reginald Hazzard	1946	1949	
Hugh Wrigley	1949	1952	
Harry Menzies	1953	1956	
George Patterson	1957	1960	
John Allgrove	1966		
P. R. Searcy		October 1970	
R. Barcham	October 1970	March 1972	

=== Senior Trade Commissioners, 2007–present ===
Name	Start of term	End of term	Notes
Phil Ingram	2007	2013	
Dan Tebbut	2013	2015	
Sam Guthrie	2016		

=== Commissioners ===
Name	Start of term	End of term	Notes
R. Barcham	1 March 1972	10 May 1972	
Ivor Gordon Bowden	10 May 1972	27 June 1974	
H. D. White	27 June 1974	26 November 1976	
Ian Haig	26 November 1976	21 April 1979	
Ian Nicholson	21 April 1979	3 June 1982	
Donald Horne	3 June 1982	1986	

=== Consuls-General ===
Name	Start of term	End of term	Notes
Penny Wensley	1986	1989	
Geoff Bentley	1989	1992	
Jocelyn Chey	1992	1995	
Geoff Walsh	1995	June 1998	
Susan Boyd	June 1998	July 1999	
Bill Tweddell	July 1999	January 2002	
David O'Leary	January 2002	January 2005	
Murray Cobban	January 2005	April 2008	
Les Luck	April 2008	October 2011	
Paul Tighe	October 2011	3 April 2017	
Michaela Browning	3 April 2017	25 February 2020	
Ryan Neelam (Acting)	25 February 2020	4 October 2020	
Elizabeth Ward	4 October 2020	3 November 2023	
Gareth Williams	3 November 2023	Present	

== See also ==
- Australia–Hong Kong relations
- U.S. Consulate General, Hong Kong
- British Consulate-General, Hong Kong
