= Peter Nguyen (judge) =

Hong Kong judge (1943–2020)

Judge of the Court of First Instance
- In office 4 February 1998 – 2008

Director of Public Prosecutions
- In office 1994 – 14 October 1997
- Succeeded by: Grenville Cross

Personal details
- Born: 1 October 1943 Vietnam
- Died: 16 June 2020 (aged 77) Hong Kong
- Education: Inns of Court School of Law

Peter Van Tu Nguyen SBS QC SC (Chinese: 阮雲甆; pinyin: Ruǎn Yúncí; Wade–Giles: Juan Yuen-tsih, Yuen Wan-tsz, Vietnamese: Phêrô Nguyễn Vân Từ; 1 October 1943 – 16 June 2020), was a judge and Queen's Counsel from Hong Kong.

== Early life ==
Nguyen was born in Vietnam and moved to Hong Kong in 1948. He was called to the Bar in England in 1970 and joined the Prosecutions Division of the then Legal Department the same year as assistant Crown counsel, rising to the rank of Crown counsel when he left the department in 1974. He subsequently entered private practice as a defence barrister.

== Career ==
After 20 years in private practice, Nguyen was appointed Director of Public Prosecutions in 1994, becoming the first ethnically Chinese person to hold the position. He resigned from the department two weeks before the Handover in 1997, officially leaving office in October. He was succeeded by Grenville Cross.

He went on to serve as a judge in the Court of First Instance of the territory's High Court in 1997 until retirement in 2008. In 1999, he served as the presiding judge in the Hello Kitty murder case. After retiring as a judge, Nguyen served as a member of Torture Claims Appeal Board from 2012 until his death.

== Death ==
Nguyen was found unconscious at his Pok Fu Lam home on 16 June 2020, and was declared dead at the age of 77 after being rushed to Queen Mary Hospital. He was survived by his wife and son.

Legal offices
Preceded by John Wood	Director of Public Prosecutions of Hong Kong; 1994–1997	Succeeded by Grenville Cross
