= Grenville Cross =

Hong Kong and British barrister

Grenville Cross GBS KC SC
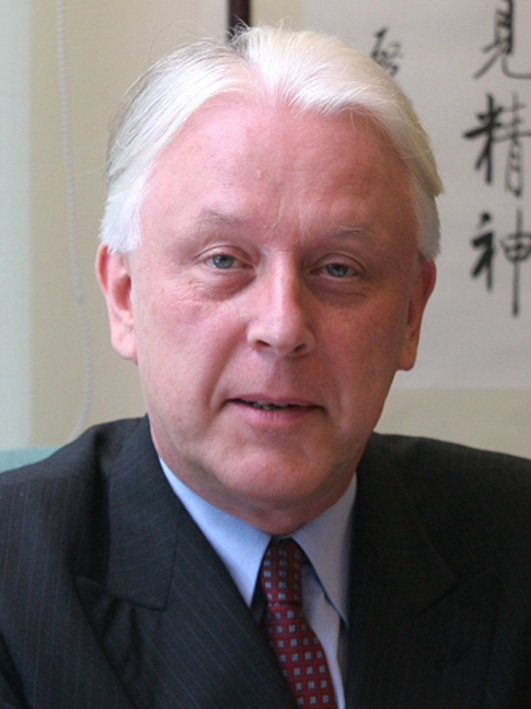

Director of Public Prosecutions
- In office 15 October 1997 – 21 October 2009
- Preceded by: Peter Nguyen
- Succeeded by: Ian McWalters

Vice-Chairman of IAP Senate
- In office 26 June 2011 – 24 September 2023

Chairman, Standing Committee, Prosecutors in Difficulty, IAP
- Incumbent
- Assumed office 26 April 2013

Personal details
- Born: 15 June 1951 (age 75)
- Spouse: Elaine YL Tsui
- Education: Culford School; University of Southampton; Middle Temple
- Profession: Barrister-at-law; Academic; Author

Ian Grenville Cross

Chinese name
- Traditional Chinese: 江樂士
- Simplified Chinese: 江乐士
Transcriptions
Standard Mandarin
- Hanyu Pinyin: Jiāng Lèshì
- Wade–Giles: Chiang Loh-shih
Yue: Cantonese
- Jyutping: gong1 lok6 si6

Vietnamese name
- Vietnamese: Giang Lạc-sĩ

Ian Grenville Cross GBS KC SC (Chinese: 江樂士, born 15 June 1951) is a British barrister who was appointed Director of Public Prosecutions (DPP) of Hong Kong on 15 October 1997, and held this post for over 12 years, until 21 October 2009. He was the first DPP to be appointed after the transfer of sovereignty over Hong Kong on 1 July 1997, and the appointment signalled that suitably qualified expatriates who were committed to Hong Kong still had a role to play in government in the post-colonial era. A career prosecutor, Cross was the seventh holder of the post since its creation in 1979, and the longest serving. On 26 June 2011, he was elected the vice-chairman (Senate) of the International Association of Prosecutors, of which he is a Senator-for-Life.

== Education and early career ==
Cross was educated privately at Culford School (1959–69), Suffolk, England, where he chaired the Debating Society. In 1973, he graduated in law from the University of Southampton, where, at different times, he chaired both the Conservative and Unionist Association and the Conservative Monday Club. He read for the Bar at the College of Law, Chancery Lane, London EC4 (1973–74).

Cross was called to the Bar of England and Wales in 1974 by the Middle Temple, of which he was a Blackstone Entrance Exhibitioner (major), and was admitted in 1981 to the Bar of Hong Kong. He practised on the South Eastern Circuit of England and Wales, from the chambers of Jeffrey Thomas, QC, MP, at No. 3 Temple Gardens, London, EC4, from 1974 to 1976. He was then appointed an in-house prosecutor by HM Customs and Excise Department for England and Wales, from 1976 to 1978. He joined the Attorney General's Chambers (now the Department of Justice) of Hong Kong as Crown Counsel in 1978.

== Public prosecutions ==
As Director of Public Prosecutions in Hong Kong, Cross, with support from Secretary for Justice Elsie Leung, worked to modernize and internationalize the public prosecution system.

Prior to his appointment as DPP, Cross served, from 1991 to 1997, as the Deputy DPP of Hong Kong, specialising in appellate advocacy. In that capacity, he prosecuted the last criminal case from Hong Kong to be heard by the Judicial Committee of the Privy Council (R v Peter Maclennan), in June 1997, and the first criminal case to be heard by the Court of Final Appeal of Hong Kong (HKSAR v Mui Po Chu), in September 1997. He conducted twelve appeals before the Judicial Committee of the Privy Council between 1988 and 1997, and, after the transfer of sovereignty of Hong Kong, he prosecuted six appeals before the Hong Kong Court of Final Appeal (and its Appeal Committee), which replaced the Judicial Committee of the Privy Council as Hong Kong's ultimate appellate body on 1 July 1997.

Cross was appointed Queen's Counsel in 1990 (which became King's Counsel upon the death of Queen Elizabeth II on 8 September 2022), becoming Senior Counsel in 1997, following the transfer of sovereignty of Hong Kong. Aged 38, he was the youngest prosecutor to have taken silk in Hong Kong, a distinction that he retains. From 1999 to 2010, Cross served as an Official Justice of the Peace (JP). The Hong Kong Tourism Board appointed Cross as its Hong Kong Convention Ambassador for 2003 to 2005, and again for 2006–07.

Cross led his Office into the International Association of Prosecutors in 2001 and hosted key conferences in 2004 and 2007 on drug offenses and prosecutorial transparency. Elected to the association's executive committee in 2007, he later received a Certificate of Merit in 2010. He continues to serve in the association's Senate.

Cross was awarded the Silver Bauhinia Star (SBS) in the Hong Kong Special Administrative Region Establishment Day Honours List 2010. Thereafter, in the Hong Kong Special Administrative Region Honours List 2021, he was awarded the Gold Bauhinia Star (GBS).

After relinquishing his post as DPP, Cross, who had previously declined a judgeship in the High Court, accepted a series of appointments, mostly law-related.On 22 October 2009, he was appointed special counsel to the Secretary for Justice. In the following years, he took on several academic and professional roles, including adjunct professor of law at the China University of Political Science and Law, honorary professor at the University of Hong Kong, and visiting professor at The Chinese University of Hong Kong. He is currently active in the International Association of Prosecutors, of which he is a Senator-for-Life, and chairs its Standing Committee on Prosecutors in Difficulty (having previously served as the vice-chairman of its Senate). Additionally, he serves as sentencing editor of Hong Kong Cases and Archbold Hong Kong. He is also an honorary consultant to the Child Protection Institute of Against Child Abuse, of which he has been the patron since 2018.

On 26 October 2016, he was appointed as a visiting professor of law at Zhongnan University of Economics and Law in Wuhan. Two years later, on 3 April 2018, he became the Leave Means Leave Ambassador for Hong Kong and Macao.

Cross was appointed to the 90-member advisory Presidium for John Lee Ka-chiu's campaign for HKSAR Chief Executive on 20 April 2022.

== Views ==
In an open letter to Rishi Sunak in 2024, Cross presented a defense of Hong Kong's legal system and governance under the "one country, two systems" framework, arguing that Hong Kong's rule of law remains robust and independent. He contends that Jimmy Lai's prosecution is not politically motivated but based on legitimate legal grounds related to national security, stating that free speech is constitutionally protected but not absolute. Cross criticizes foreign commentary, particularly from UK officials, as misinformed and urges a more accurate understanding of Hong Kong's legal environment. He stated that the National Security Law has “restored order” and is aligned with international legal standards,

On 27 May 2020 Cross spoke to Dot Dot News (Hong Kong based, owned by media group controlled by the Hong Kong Liaison Office) in a filmed interview entitled 'National Security Law for HK | Insight from Grenville Cross: Is it legitimate?' After the National Security Law came into effect, Cross stated that Malaysia and Singapore "ha[ve] national security laws which are far more draconian than Hong Kong's, in terms of preventive detention, bail denial, admissibility of incriminating evidence, and punishment." He has argued that "[t]he new law...while recognizing that national security must be safeguarded, also acknowledges that the rights of a defendant must also be protected, which is exactly the approach adopted throughout the common law world."

== Editorships and published works ==
Cross is the co-author of Sentencing in Hong Kong, now in its eleventh edition. He is the Sentencing Editor of Archbold Criminal Pleading, Evidence and Practice. He serves on the editorial board of Hong Kong Cases. He was previously General Editor of the Criminal Appeals Bulletin (1986–2009), and Consultant Editor of Hong Kong Law Reports and Digest (1988–2006).

Cross is a regular opinion columnist for China Daily and South China Morning Post.

== Personal life ==
Cross is married to Elaine Tsui Yee-lin (徐怡玲), an artist and a former Superintendent of the Hong Kong Police Force.

Legal offices
Preceded by Peter Nguyen	Director of Public Prosecutions of Hong Kong; 1997–2009	Succeeded by Ian McWalters
