= International Association of Prosecutors =

Non-governmental organization

- Abbreviation: IAP
- Formation: June 6, 1995; 30 years ago
- Founded at: Vienna, Austria
- Type: NGO
- Purpose: Setting and raising standards of professional conduct and ethics for prosecutors worldwide.
- Headquarters: The Hague, Netherlands
- Secretary General: Han Moraal
- President: Cheol-Kyu Hwang
- Website: https://www.iap-association.org/

The International Association of Prosecutors (IAP) is a global non-governmental organisation of prosecutors, established by the United Nations in 1995, Vienna. It has 183 organizational members from 177 countries, and individual members.

The IAP was established due to growth in transnational crime like drug trafficking, money laundering and fraud. It traces its origins to the eighth United Nations Congress on Crime Prevention and Criminal Justice in 1990, and subsequent development by the Hungarian National Association of Prosecutors, working with the Crime Prevention and Criminal Justice Branch of the United Nations Office at Vienna (UNOV). At a meeting at UNOV in June 1995, representatives of eleven countries established the IAP as an independent NGO, with the secretariat located in Groningen, Netherlands, by November. Participants from 49 countries attended its first conference in Budapest in September 1996. In 1999 the headquarters moved to The Hague, since it was a center of international law. That year it announced the "IAP Standards of Professional Responsibility and Statement of the Essential Duties and Rights of Prosecutors," and asked its members to certify their adherence to it. In 2003 the IAP published the Human Rights Manual for Prosecutors. By 2020 IAP membership had grown to organizations in 177 countries, representing more than 350,000 people, as well as some 850 individual members. Its annual budget stood at about €500,000.

Regional conferences in Africa, Latin America, Western Europe, Eastern Europe/Central Asia, North America and the Caribbean and the Asia-Pacific region are now regular events in the IAP, and are mainly aimed at front line prosecutors. The association produces newsletters and the IAP Journal, which are available online to members, as well as the Forum for International Criminal Justice. A Global Prosecutors E-Crime Network provides information of interest to prosecutors concerning cyber crime.

The IAP is an independent body, but its 1999 Standards of Professional Responsibility were adopted by the United Nations Commission on Crime Prevention and Criminal Justice (UNCCPCJ) in 2008. In fact the idea for the IAP arose during the same 1990 United Nations Congress on Crime Prevention and Criminal Justice which proclaimed the UN's "Guidelines on the Role of Prosecutors.", citing human rights clauses in the UN's founding document.

Regarding the International Criminal Court (ICC), a court established by treaty and not part of the UN, the IAP has "shown... interest in promoting a Code of Conduct for Prosecutors before the ICC, after the topic was neglected by the ICC negotiations,... [which] shows that the 'profession' may step on occasions to fill in regulatory gaps... It remains to be seen if a Prosecutor could ever be disciplined nationally or internationally by a professional order. The International Association of Prosecutors certainly does not have that power."

UNESCO and the IAP "developed the first international guidelines on investigating and prosecuting crimes against journalists with key recommendations for prosecutors."

== See also ==
- International Bar Association
