= Michael Hartmann (judge) =

Australian-born Hong Kong judge

The Honourable Mr Justice Michael Hartmann GBS
- 夏正民

Chairman of the Hong Kong Market Misconduct Tribunal and the Securities and Futures Appeals Tribunal
- Incumbent
- Assumed office 2011

Non-Permanent Judge of the Court of Final Appeal of Hong Kong
- In office 2010–2016

Justice of Appeal of the Court of Appeal of Hong Kong
- In office 2008–2012

Judge of the Court of First Instance of the High Court of Hong Kong
- In office 1998–2008

Judge of the District Court of Hong Kong
- In office 1991–1998

Personal details
- Born: 24 July 1944 (age 82) Bombay, British Raj
- Education: University of London

Michael Hartmann
- Chinese: 夏正民
Transcriptions
Standard Mandarin
- Hanyu Pinyin: Xià Zhèngmín
Yue: Cantonese
- Jyutping: haa6 zing3 man4

Michael John Hartmann GBS (Chinese: 夏正民) is a Hong Kong judge. He is Chairman of the Market Misconduct Tribunal and the Securities and Futures Appeals Tribunal in Hong Kong.

== Early life and education ==
Hartmann was born in Bombay (now Mumbai), British India on 24 July 1944 to a British father and an Australian mother. He was raised near Orange, New South Wales, Australia. He holds Australian citizenship.

Hartmann moved to England at the age of nine. He attended St Edmund's College in Ware, Hertfordshire. His parents subsequently settled in Rhodesia (now Zimbabwe), where he joined them in after completing his schooling. He received an LLB from the University of London through the University College of Rhodesia in 1967. After university, he completed national service in the Rhodesian Army.

== Legal career ==
Hartmann was admitted as an attorney in Rhodesia in 1971 and practised in Harare. He left Zimbabwe in 1983, three years after independence, having been advised to leave or face deportation. His departure followed his involvement in the Thornhill affair in which the government of the day came to regard him not simply as a defence lawyer but as an ally of the defendants. He left Zimbabwe and moved to Hong Kong to join the Legal Department as Crown Counsel. He was promoted to Senior Crown Counsel in 1984 and became a Deputy Principal Crown Counsel in 1989.

== Judicial career ==
Hartmann left the Legal Department and was appointed a District Judge in 1991.

In 1998, Hartmann was appointed as a Judge of the Court of First Instance of the High Court of Hong Kong.

From 1998 to 2000, Hartmann served as Chairman of the Insider Dealing Tribunal.

From 2000 to 2008, Hartmann was Judge in charge of the Constitutional and Administrative Law List in the Court of First Instance of the High Court of Hong Kong.

In 2008, Hartmann was appointed as a Justice of Appeal of the Court of Appeal.

In 2010, Hartmann was appointed as a Non-Permanent Judge of the Court of Final Appeal. From 2010 to 2012, Hartmann primarily sat in the Court of Appeal and heard two cases in the Court of Final Appeal.

In 2011, Hartmann was appointed as Chairman of the Market Misconduct Tribunal and the Securities and Futures Appeals Tribunal for a three-year term from December 2011 to November 2014.

In 2012, Hartmann retired from the Court of Appeal. He was awarded the Gold Bauhinia Star by the Chief Executive. He continued to serve as a Non-Permanent Judge of the Court of Final Appeal until 2016.

In 2013, Hartmann sat as a Deputy High Court Judge.

In 2014, Hartmann was re-appointed as Chairman of the Market Misconduct Tribunal and the Securities and Futures Appeals Tribunal for another three-year term until November 2017. In 2017, his appointment was extended for a further three-year term until November 2020.

In 2018, Hartmann was appointed as Chairman and Commissioner of the Commission of Inquiry into the Diaphragm Wall and Platform Slab Construction Works at the Hung Hom Station Extension under the Shatin to Central Link Project.

In 2020, Hartmann's appointment as Chairman of the Market Misconduct Tribunal and the Securities and Futures Appeals Tribunal was extended again for another three-year term until November 2023. In 2023, his term was further extended until November 2026.

== Novels ==
Hartmann is the author of eight novels published between 1975 and 1993. He wrote four adventure thrillers set in Africa and four more set in Hong Kong and Asia.

His African novels are Game for Vultures (1975), Leap for the Sun (1976), and the two-novel Ben Dryden series — Shadow of the Leopard (1979) and Days of Thunder (1980) — featuring a recurring journalist protagonist working in Africa. His Hong Kong novels are A Web of Dragons (1987), The Phoenix Pact (1988), Tigers of Deceit (1990), and Horses of Vengeance (1993).

Order of precedence
Previous: Benjamin Tang; Recipients of the Gold Bauhinia Star	Hong Kong order of precedence Recipients of the Gold Bauhinia Star	Succeeded by Gabriel Leung; Recipients of the Gold Bauhinia Star
