= Keith Yeung =

Hong Kong judge and law officer (born 1964)

The Honourable Mr Justice Keith Yeung Kar-hung JA
- 楊家雄

Justice of Appeal of the Court of Appeal of the High Court
- Incumbent
- Assumed office 21 May 2026

Judge of the Court of First Instance of the High Court
- In office 29 July 2019 – 20 May 2026

Director of Public Prosecutions
- In office 9 September 2013 – 8 September 2017
- Preceded by: Kevin Zervos
- Succeeded by: David Leung

Personal details
- Born: 1964 (age 61–62) Hong Kong
- Education: University of Hong Kong

Keith Yeung Kah-hung

Chinese name
- Traditional Chinese: 楊家雄
- Simplified Chinese: 杨家雄
Transcriptions
Standard Mandarin
- Hanyu Pinyin: Yáng Jiāxióng
- Wade–Giles: Yang Chia-Hsiung
Yue: Cantonese
- Jyutping: joeng4 gaa1 hung4

Vietnamese name
- Vietnamese: Duong Gia-Hung

Keith Yeung Kar-hung (Chinese: 楊家雄) is a Justice of Appeal of the Court of Appeal of Hong Kong, and was previously the 5th Director of Public Prosecutions of Hong Kong.

== Legal career ==
Keith Yeung - Dương Gia-hùng received an LLB in 1986 and a PCLL in 1987 from the University of Hong Kong.

Yeung was called to the Hong Kong Bar in 1987 and was a barrister in private practice between 1988 and 2013. He was a member of Plowman Chambers. He took silk in 2009.

On 1 August 2013, Yeung was appointed as the Director of Public Prosecutions of Hong Kong. He was the first ethnic Chinese to take up this post.

== Judicial career ==
Yeung sat as a Deputy Judge of the Court of First Instance of the High Court of Hong Kong for periods in 2013, 2018 and 2019.

On 29 July 2019, Yeung was appointed a Judge of the Court of First Instance of the High Court of Hong Kong.

Yeung was the Returning Officer for the 2022 Hong Kong Chief Executive election.

On 21 May 2026, Yeung was elevated to the Court of Appeal.

Legal offices
Preceded by Kevin Zervos	Director of Public Prosecutions of Hong Kong; 2013–2017	Succeeded by David Leung
