= Hong Kong House =

Heritage-listed building in Sydney, Australia

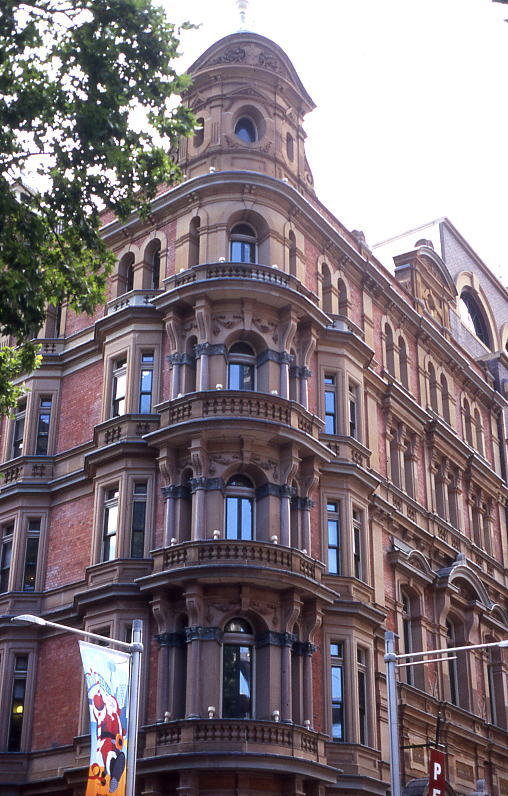
- Hong Kong House in 2007.

- Location within Sydney
- Former names: Central Hotel; Gresham Hotel

General information
- Type: Commercial hotel/offices
- Architectural style: Victorian Free Classical
- Location: 80 Druitt Street, Sydney, New South Wales, Australia
- Coordinates: 33°52′21″S 151°12′23″E
- Completed: 1891
- Client: Excelsior Land Investment and Building Company and Bank Limited
- Owner: Government of Hong Kong

Design and construction
- Architect: Ambrose Thornley
- Main contractor: Edward Johnson

New South Wales Heritage Register
- Official name: Gresham Hotel; Hong Kong House
- Type: State heritage (built)
- Designated: 2 April 1999
- Reference no.: 291
- Type: Hotel
- Category: Commercial

Hong Kong House, also known since 1995 as the Hong Kong Economic and Trade Office, Sydney, is a landmark heritage building and former hotel in the Sydney central business district, New South Wales, Australia. Built in 1891 to a design by Ambrose Thornley, it is located on 80 Druitt Street, at the corner with York Street, and is adjacent to other prominent heritage landmarks, the Sydney Town Hall and the Queen Victoria Building. Formerly known as Gresham Hotel, the property was added to the New South Wales State Heritage Register on 2 April 1999.

Hong Kong House houses the Hong Kong Economic and Trade Office, the office of the Hong Kong Tourism Board in Australasia, Invest Hong Kong and the office of the Hong Kong Trade Development Council.

== History ==
In 1888, the Excelsior Land, Building and Investment Company and Bank Limited held a competition for the design of a hotel and banking premises on the site. The competition was subsequently won by architect Ambrose Thornley, with his final design submitted in June 1890 and labelled "Central Hotel". By the late 1900s, the hotel had been renamed the "Gresham Hotel" and in 1896 a branch of the City Bank of Sydney had been opened on the ground level of the building. In 1925 the hotel was bought by Tooth and Co. When the City Bank of Sydney was bought out, the bank became a branch of the Australian Bank of Commerce in 1918, and later a branch of the Bank of New South Wales when they bought the Bank of Commerce in 1931. In the late 1980s the "Gresham Hotel" was converted to offices and since 1995 has housed the Hong Kong Economic and Trade Office.

The building is listed on the New South Wales State Heritage Register and the (now defunct) Register of the National Estate, with its interior listed in the City of Sydney Local Environmental Plan. A plaque commemorating the building's history and continuing association with Hong Kong was unveiled on 23 June 2011 by Governor of NSW, Marie Bashir, and Hong Kong Chief Executive, Donald Tsang. In late 2014, during the "Umbrella" protests in Hong Kong, the street-level frontages of Hong Kong House were covered with yellow, pink and blue Post-it notes containing messages of solidarity with the protests.

== Heritage listing ==
As at 3 March 2005, Hong Kong House, formerly the Gresham Hotel and Central Hotel, is situated on a prominent site on the corner of York and Druitt Streets forming part of the Town Hall streetscape. It is a five-storey building of Victorian Free Classical Style. The erection of this building as a prestigious hotel in the early 1890s is historically significant in understanding the impact that the building of Centennial Hall and the Queen Victoria Building had on creating a focus for civic pride in Victorian Sydney. It is an important building in the professional career of architect Ambrose Thornley. The building has aesthetic significance as a rare intact original exterior of high quality with outstanding potential due to its successive restorations to continue in its restored state. It is particularly noted for its use of ornate stone decoration. The building is significant for its contribution as a component of the Town Hall Precinct Streetscape.

Hong Kong House was listed on the New South Wales State Heritage Register on 2 April 1999.

== Gallery ==
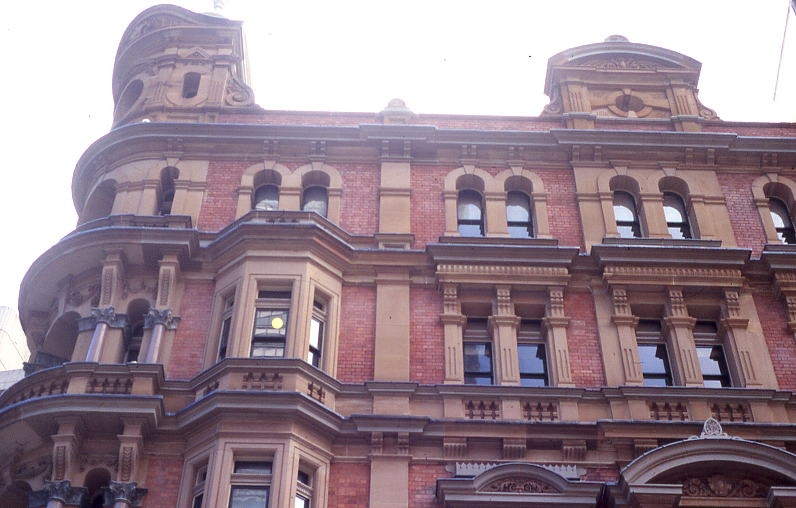
Hong Kong House York Street elevation, 2007.

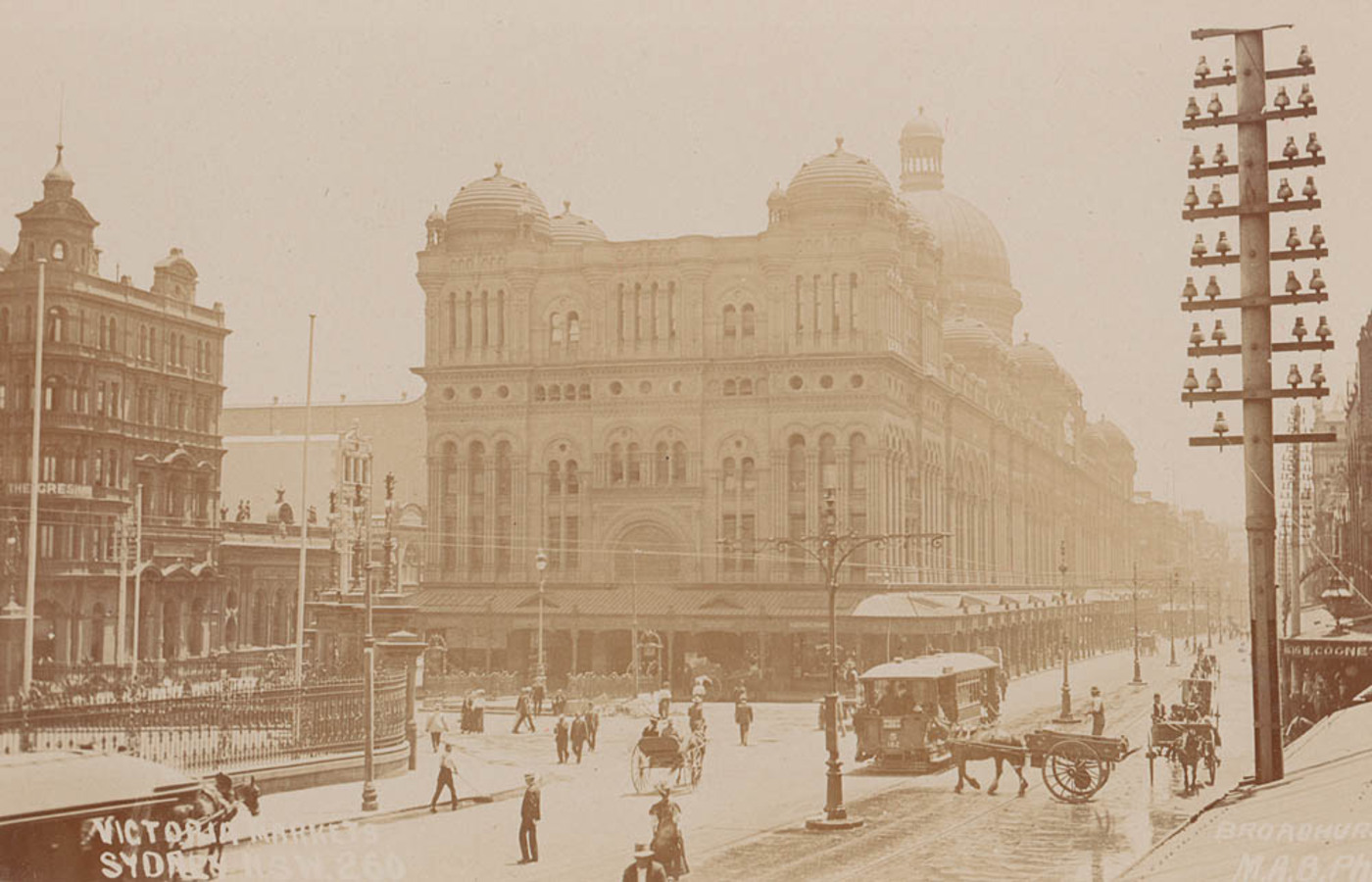
"The Gresham" Hotel (far left) photographed circa 1900.

== See also ==
- Architecture of Sydney
