= Kevin Zervos =

Justice of Appeal in Hong Kong

The Honourable Mr Justice Kevin Paul Zervos SC, JP

Justice of Appeal of the Court of Appeal
- Incumbent
- Assumed office 2018

Judge of the Court of First Instance
- In office 2013–2018

Director of Public Prosecutions
- In office 25 March 2011 – 8 September 2013
- Preceded by: Ian McWalters
- Succeeded by: Keith Yeung

Personal details
- Born: 1953 (age 72–73) Melbourne, Australia
- Education: Monash University (BS, LLB); University of Hong Kong (LLM)

Kevin Paul Zervos

Chinese name
- Traditional Chinese: 薛偉成
- Simplified Chinese: 薛伟成
Transcriptions
Standard Mandarin
- Hanyu Pinyin: Xuē Wěichéng
- Wade–Giles: Hsueh Wuei-cherng
Yue: Cantonese
- Jyutping: suet3 wai5 sing4

Vietnamese name
- Vietnamese: Tiết Vĩ-thành

Kevin Paul Zervos SC JP (Chinese: 薛偉成; born November 1953) is a Justice of Appeal of the Court of Appeal of Hong Kong. He previously served as Director of Public Prosecutions of the Department of Justice of the Hong Kong Special Administrative Region from March 2011 to September 2013.

Zervos was a veteran of frontline criminal prosecutions spanning two decades and a criminal courtroom advocate and human rights specialist.

== Personal life and education ==
Zervos was born in Melbourne and is of Greek descent. He graduated in Science (1975) and Law (1977) from Monash University. He attained his Master of Laws (Human Rights) from the University of Hong Kong in 2009.

== Career ==
In 1984, Zervos began work in Australia with the Special Prosecutor's office responsible for the investigation and prosecution of large scale revenue frauds. From 1985, he was Senior Assistant Director of the office of the Commonwealth Director of Public Prosecutions at the Melbourne and Sydney offices where he was in charge of the Major Fraud Section. From 1989 to 1992, he was General Counsel to the Independent Commission Against Corruption in New South Wales before moving to Hong Kong.

In 1992, Zervos joined the then Attorney General's Chambers in Hong Kong, initially attached to the Commercial Crime Unit specialising in white-collar crime, then as Head of Appeals specialising in Human Rights, and later as Chief of Staff of the department's Prosecutions Division. In May 2003, Zervos was appointed as Senior Counsel in Hong Kong. He became Deputy Director of Public Prosecutions in 2008. Zervos has prosecuted in many high-profile cases, including the brutal assassination by a triad hit squad of a key ICAC witness in one of the world's biggest tobacco-smuggling cases, complex fraud and corruption cases and human and constitutional rights appeals.

== Director of Public Prosecutions ==
After taking office as Director of Public Prosecutions in 2011, Zervos was "determined to respond to growing public demands for more transparency in the justice system" in Hong Kong. The department's Prosecutions Division, under Zervos' leadership, held its first and second Prosecutions Week in 2012 and 2013, as an initiative to "reach out to the community, especially the young, to explain and discuss the criminal justice system and to strengthen the commitment to the rule of law." The department also organised the first Criminal Law Conference 2012 which Zervos hoped would serve as "the catalyst for positive reform of the Hong Kong criminal justice system" by putting together topics for discussion to identify possible areas for reform.

The Chairman of the Law Society's Criminal Law and Procedure Committee, Stephen Hung Wan-shun, praised him for making the Hong Kong criminal justice system more transparent and for increasing communication between the department and defence lawyers. He noted that Zervos was "open to different views" and more active than his predecessors in attending court sessions instead of sitting in his office."

Zervos is a staunch supporter of human rights. Prompted by growing concern over international human trafficking, the department launched an initiative in 2013 to record and map cases of sex trafficking, enforced labour and abused domestic helpers. In September 2011, Zervos decided not to prosecute 109 out of 113 protesters arrested during an anti-budget demonstration in March that year but wrote to them instead to remind them that demonstrations should be peaceful.

Zervos advocated compassion for some first time offenders of minor crimes. "I can see the positive effects of treating [first-time offenders] in a just and compassionate way. It is important to give a person a second chance and not to break their spirit. When you [give them a reprieve] the chances are they don't reoffend and you won't see them in the criminal court again," Zervos said. "We are mainly talking about people coming before the court for the first time – sometimes they are young, foolish; sometimes they are mature people who act out of character and do something foolish."

On 30 June 2012, Zervos was appointed as a justice of the peace.

=== Retirement as DPP ===
Zervos retired as DPP on 8 September 2013. Before his retirement as DPP, the Hong Kong Bar Association has expressed its gratitude to Zervos "for his outstanding service and contribution to the community, the Rule of Law and administration of justice in Hong Kong". The Secretary for Justice of Hong Kong, Rimsky Yuen SC has also extended his gratitude to Zervos for his valuable service in the justice department for over 21 years. "During his tenure as the DPP, he has strived to uphold the rule of law by handling prosecutions in a just and impartial manner. He has also been active in promoting community awareness of the rule of law by organising a number of public activities,' said the justice chief, adding that Zervos' "outstanding performance has won the recognition and praise of the Government as well as members of the legal profession."

== Judicial career ==
On 16 September 2013, Zervos was appointed a Judge of the Court of First Instance of the High Court of Hong Kong.

As Zervos was the DPP in the Department of Justice prior to the appointment, he could not, for six months after joining the Judiciary, deal with any criminal trials or appeals or any civil cases involving the Government.

Following his appointment, Zervos heard principally criminal matters, but also handled judicial review cases and some civil cases.

Zervos was appointed a Justice of Appeal of the Court of Appeal of Hong Kong with effect from 30 July 2018.

Legal offices
Preceded by Ian McWalters	Director of Public Prosecutions of Hong Kong; 2011–2013	Succeeded by Keith Yeung
