= Cheng Huan =

- 清洪

Personal details
- Born: Yap Cheng Hock (葉清福) Teluk Intan, Malaysia
- Education: Trinity Hall, Cambridge

Cheng Huan, QC, SC (Chinese: 清洪; born 1947, Teluk Intan, Malaysia) is a prominent barrister in Hong Kong.
