= Ian McWalters =

Hong Kong judge

The Honourable Mr Justice Ian McWalters GBS, SC, JP

Chairman of the Hong Kong Market Misconduct Tribunal and the Securities and Futures Appeals Tribunal
- Incumbent
- Assumed office 2021

Justice of Appeal of the Court of Appeal
- In office 2014–2021

Judge of the Court of First Instance
- In office 2011–2014

Director of Public Prosecutions
- In office 22 October 2009 – 9 February 2011
- Preceded by: Ian Grenville Cross
- Succeeded by: Kevin Zervos

Personal details
- Born: 1951 (age 74–75) Australia
- Education: University of Sydney

Ian Charles McWalters

Chinese name
- Traditional Chinese: 麥偉德
- Simplified Chinese: 麦伟德
Transcriptions
Standard Mandarin
- Hanyu Pinyin: Mài Wěidé
- Wade–Giles: Mai Wei-teh
Yue: Cantonese
- Jyutping: mak6 wai5 dak1

Vietnamese name
- Vietnamese: Mạch Vĩ-đức

Ian Charles McWalters GBS SC JP (Chinese: 麥偉德; born 1951) is Chairman of the Market Misconduct Tribunal and the Securities and Futures Appeals Tribunal in Hong Kong. He is a retired judge and former prosecutor.

== Legal career ==
McWalters graduated from the University of Sydney with a BA in 1972 and subsequently obtained an LLB in 1975.

He was admitted as solicitor in New South Wales, in 1975 and as barrister and solicitor in Papua New Guinea in the same year. He was admitted as barrister and solicitor in the Australian Capital Territory in 1994 and as barrister in Queensland in 2001.

McWalters was called to the Bar in Hong Kong in 2001. He took silk in 2005.

In 2009, McWalters was appointed Director of Public Prosecutions of Hong Kong.

On 1 July 2010, McWalters was appointed as a justice of the peace.

== Judicial career ==
In 2011, McWalters was appointed a Judge of the Court of First Instance of the High Court of Hong Kong. As he was the DPP in the Department of Justice prior to the appointment, he could not, for six months after joining the Judiciary, deal with any criminal trials or appeals or any civil cases involving the Government.

In 2014, he was appointed Justice of Appeal of the Court of Appeal of the High Court of Hong Kong.

In February 2016, on reaching the retirement age of 65, on the recommendation of the Judicial Officers Recommendation Commission, his term of office was extended for 3 years. In February 2019, his term of office was extended for another 2 years. In February 2021, he retired from the bench.

McWalters sat as a Deputy Judge of the High Court of Hong Kong from April to September 2021.

On 1 July 2021, McWalters was awarded the Gold Bauhinia Star in recognition of his dedicated and distinguished service in the Judiciary during the past ten years.

On 30 July 2021, McWalters was appointed as Chairman of the Market Misconduct Tribunal and the Securities and Futures Appeals Tribunal for a 3-year term from 1 October 2021 to 30 September 2024. In 2024, his term was extended for 3 years until 2027.

Legal offices
Preceded by Ian Grenville Cross	Director of Public Prosecutions of Hong Kong; 2009–2011	Succeeded by Kevin Zervos
