= Registrar General's Department (Hong Kong) =

Former Hong Kong government agency

The Registrar General's Department (Chinese: 總登記官署, later 登記總署 and 註冊總署) was the name of two different government agencies that existed in two different points of time in British Hong Kong. The portfolio of the departments bearing this name varied from overseeing the land and companies registries to regulating the colony's Chinese population, but the head of the department was always known as the Registrar General.

== The first department (1844-1913) ==
The first department to bear the Registrar General's name was established in 1844 and is the predecessor of the modern Home Affairs Department. Properly known as the Census and Registration Office at the time of its creation, the agency was responsible for overseeing and regulating the Chinese community in Hong Kong. The agency was referred to as the Registrar General's Department in the Births and Deaths Registration Ordinance 1896.

The department was renamed the Secretariat for Chinese Affairs, and the Registrar General retitled the Secretary for Chinese Affairs, with the passage of the Registrar General (Change of Name) Ordinance 1913. With that, the title fell into disuse.

== The second department (1949-1993) ==
The second department to bear the name was created on 1 April 1949 as the product of a merger between the Marriage Registry, Land Office, Companies Registry, Trademarks Registry, the Office of the Official Receiver in Bankruptcy, and the Official Trustee's Office. Some of these functions were previously carried out by the Registrar of the Supreme Court and later the Land Officer, whose office was located in the Supreme Court Building on Jackson Road. The new Registrar General's Department remained at the Courts of Justice until 1959, when it relocated to the West Wing of the newly built Central Government Offices on Ice House Street. Its final location was in the Queensway Government Offices, where it was housed from 1986 to 1993.

The Registrar General was a legal officer under the Legal Officers Ordinance 1950, and the department was staffed by Assistant Crown Solicitors seconded from the Legal Department. In 1991, the department consisted of three divisions: the Land Office, the Commercial Division and the Official Receiver's Office. The Registrar General exercised the statutory powers of the Land Officer, Registrar of Companies, Registrar of Money Lenders, Official Receiver and Official Trustee.

The department was dissolved in 1993, with its functions taken up by the Immigration Department, the new Land Registry, the Intellectual Property Department, Companies Registry, and the Official Receiver's Office.

== List of Registrars General ==
=== Registrars General, 1845–1912 ===
| No. | Portrait | Name | Term of office | | Governor | Ref |
|---|---|---|---|---|---|---|
| 1 | | Samuel Turner Fearon | 1845 | 1845 | Sir John Francis Davis (1844–1848) | |
| 2 | | Andrew Lysaght Inglis | 16 July 1845 | 1849 | Sir John Francis Davis (1844–1848) | |
| 2 | | Andrew Lysaght Inglis | 16 July 1845 | 1849 | Sir George Bonham (1848–1854) | |
| 3 | | William Thomas Mercer 馬撒爾 | 1 June 1849 | 1850 | Sir George Bonham (1848–1854) | |
| 4 | | Charles May | 1850 | 1856 | Sir George Bonham (1848–1854) | |
| 4 | | Charles May | 1850 | 1856 | Sir John Bowring (1854–1859) | |
| 5 | | Daniel Richard Caldwell | 15 November 1856 | 1862 | Sir John Bowring (1854–1859) | |
| 5 | | Daniel Richard Caldwell | 15 November 1856 | 1862 | Sir Hercules Robinson (1859–1865) | |
| 6 | | Thomas Turner | 23 May 1862 | October 1864 | Sir Hercules Robinson (1859–1865) | |
| 7 | | Sir Cecil Clementi Smith | 24 October 1864 | 1881 | Sir Hercules Robinson (1859–1865) | |
| 7 | | Sir Cecil Clementi Smith | 24 October 1864 | 1881 | Sir Richard Graves MacDonnell (1866–1872) | |
| 7 | | Sir Cecil Clementi Smith | 24 October 1864 | 1881 | Sir Arthur Kennedy (1872–1877) | |
| 7 | | Sir Cecil Clementi Smith | 24 October 1864 | 1881 | Sir John Pope Hennessy (1877–1882) | |
| 8 | | Sir James Russell 羅素 | 14 May 1881 | 1883 | Sir John Pope Hennessy (1877–1882) | |
| 8 | | Sir James Russell 羅素 | 14 May 1881 | 1883 | Sir George Bowen (1883–1885) | |
| 9 | | Frederick Stewart 史超域 | 2 April 1883 | 1887 | Sir George Bowen (1883–1885) | |
| 10 | | James Stewart Lockhart 駱克 | 10 October 1887 | 1901 | Sir William Des Voeux (1887–1891) | |
| 10 | | James Stewart Lockhart 駱克 | 10 October 1887 | 1901 | Sir William Robinson (1891–1898) | |
| 10 | | James Stewart Lockhart 駱克 | 10 October 1887 | 1901 | Sir Henry Arthur Blake (1898–1903) | |
| 11 | | Arthur Winbolt Brewin 蒲魯賢 | 15 March 1901 | 1912 | Sir Henry Arthur Blake (1898–1903) | |
| 11 | | Arthur Winbolt Brewin 蒲魯賢 | 15 March 1901 | 1912 | Sir Matthew Nathan (1904–1907) | |
| 11 | | Arthur Winbolt Brewin 蒲魯賢 | 15 March 1901 | 1912 | Sir Frederick Lugard (1907–1912) | |

=== Registrars General, 1949-1993 ===
- William Aneurin Jones, JP（1 April 1949 - 1 August 1958)
- William Kirk Thomson OBE JP 譚臣 (1 August 1958-10 April 1968）
- Walter Hume OBE JP 胡謨（10 April 1968 - 1 March 1976）
- Piers Jacobs 翟克誠（1 March 1976 - 20 September 1982）
- Noel Martin Gleeson, OBE, JP (紀禮遜) (20 September 1982 - 1 May 1993)

== See also ==
- General Register Office
