= HKCR =

HKCR may refer to:

- Hong Kong Companies Registry, a government agency in Hong Kong
- Hong Kong China Rugby Union, the governing body for rugby union in Hong Kong, abbreviated to HKCR
  - Hong Kong national rugby union team, the men's national rugby union team representing Hong Kong in international competition, administered by HKCR
  - Hong Kong women's national rugby union team
- Windows Registry#HKEY CLASSES ROOT (HKCR), a database for Microsoft Windows
