= Registrar (Hong Kong) =

Type of judicial officer in Hong Kong

Registrars are judicial officers appointed by the Chief Executive of Hong Kong to assist in the work of Hong Kong's various courts, including the Court of Final Appeal, the High Court, and the District Court. Registrars may also hold a concurrent judicial role, such as being a judge, in a lower court.

The title of Registrar-General was also previously in use in the executive branch until 1993, as the name of the government official in charge of the registries for lands, companies, marriages, bankruptcies, and more. Before the creation of the post in 1949, some of these duties were carried out by the registrar of the Supreme Court. The head of each registry is today known as a registrar.

== Registrar of the Court of Final Appeal ==
Registrar of the Court of Final Appeal of Hong Kong
- Emblem of Hong Kong
- Appointer: Chief Executive of Hong Kong
- Term length: Life tenure (until statutory retirement at age 70, but may be extended by 5 years until age 75)
- Inaugural holder: Edward Timothy Starbuck Woolley, 1997
- Formation: 1 July 1997; 29 years ago

=== Duties ===
The Registrar will consider each leave application (applying to appear in front of the Court of Final Appeal) has any reasonable grounds for arguing an appeal. If an appeal is considered arguable, it will appear before an Appeal Committee, who will then make a final decision. If the Registrar determines there is no grounds for an appeal, a "Rule 7 Summons" will be issued, in which the applicant is invited to show on paper why the Appeals Committee should hear their appeal.

The Registrar also helps with listing cases and liaising with the non-permanent judges from both Hong Kong and other common law jurisdictions on sitting in appeal cases.

Registrar
- Traditional Chinese: 香港終審法院司法常務官
Transcriptions

=== List of Registrars of the Court of Final Appeal ===
No.	Name	Term of office		Concurrent judicial role	Reason for tenure end	Appointed by
1	Mr. Edward Timothy Starbuck Woolley	1997	1999	None / full-time registrar	Retired	Tung Chee-hwa
—	Mr. Christopher Chan Cheuk, BBS (acting)	1999	2000	District Judge	Appointed Registrar of the High Court	Tung Chee-hwa
—	Ms. Betty Kwan Ka-ching, BBS (acting)	2000	2002	Deputy Registrar of the High Court	Retired	Tung Chee-hwa
—	The Hon Madam Justice Queeny Au-yeung Kwai-yue (acting)	2002	2007	Registrar of the District Court (2002–03) District Judge (2003–07)	Appointed Registrar of the High Court	Tung Chee-hwa
—	Mr. Simon Kwang Cheok-weung (acting)	2007	2014	District Judge Temporary Deputy Registrar of the High Court	Appointed full-time Registrar of the Court of Final Appeal	Donald Tsang
2	Mr. Simon Kwang Cheok-weung	2014	2018	Senior Deputy Registrar of the High Court	Appointed Registrar of the High Court	Leung Chun-ying
—	His Honour Judge Wong King-wah (acting)	2018	2023	District Judge	Appointed full-time Registrar of the Court of Final Appeal	Carrie Lam
3	His Honour Judge Wong King-wah	2023		Senior Deputy Registrar of the High Court		John Lee Ka-chiu

== Registrar of the High Court ==
Registrar of the High Court
- Emblem of Hong Kong
- Appointer: Chief Executive of Hong Kong
- Term length: Life tenure (until statutory retirement at age 70, but may be extended by 5 years until age 75)
- Formation: 7 May 1844

The registrar of the High Court is the head of the High Court Registry and is supported by three senior deputy registrars and five deputy registrars. Known as the registrar of the Supreme Court before 1 July 1997, the registrar was head of the judiciary's administration until the creation of the position of Judiciary Administrator in 1994.

=== History ===
In the late 19th century and early 20th century, the Registrar of the Supreme Court also carried out the duties of the Lands Officer and Companies Registrar, among others.

The registrar of the Supreme Court was known as the 經歷司 in Chinese until the 1980s.

=== List of Registrars of the Supreme Court and High Court ===
No.	Name	Term start	Term end	Remarks
1	Robert Dundas Cay	8 May 1844	29 April 1856	
2	Williams Hastings Alexander	29 April 1856		
3	Charles Bushe Plunket	12 May 1876		
4	Henry Frederick Gibbons	14 April 1880		
5	Edward James Ackroyd	27 February 1882		
6	Alfred Gascoyne Wise	24 March 1893		
7	James William Norton-Kyshe	28 September 1895		
8	Arathoon Seth	19 May 1904		
9	Joseph Horsford Kemp	30 October 1909		
10	Hugh Adair Nisbet	15 August 1911		
11	Charles Alexander Dick Melbourne	20 October 1928		
12	Thomas Maynard Hazelrigg	1 October 1929		
13	Ernest Philip Henry Lang	12 October 1935		
14	Lancelot Ruggles Andrewes	21 April 1940		
15	Henrique Alberto de Barros Botelho	1 May 1946		
16	Christopher Paul d'Almada e Castro	1 January 1949		
	John R. Oliver		1976	
	Simon Herbert Mayo	1976	1980	Solicitor; became VP of the Court of Appeal
	Carlye Chu Fun-ling	7 June 1999	3 October 2000	Became VP of the Court of Appeal
	Christopher Chan Cheuk	3 October 2000	21 July 2007	Solicitor
	Queeny Au-yeung Kwai-yue	1 August 2007	15 August 2012	
-	Lung Kim-wan (acting)	2012	2014	
	Lung Kim-wan	11 March 2014	10 September 2018	Solicitor
	Simon Kwang Cheok-weung	10 September 2018	Incumbent	Solicitor; previously district judge
