= High Court Building =

High Court Building may refer to:

- Auckland High Court
- Old High Court Building, Dhaka
- High Court Building (Hong Kong)
- High Court Building (Yangon)
- High Court of Australia Building
