= Land Registry (Hong Kong) =

Government department of Hong Kong

- 土地註冊處

Department overview
- Formed: August 1993
- Superseding agencies: Land Office (1844 - 1949); Registrar General's Department (1949 - 1993)
- Jurisdiction: Hong Kong
- Headquarters: 19/F, Queensway Government Offices, 66 Queensway
- Employees: 476 (Permanent); 96 (Contract)
- Minister responsible: Doris CHEUNG Mei-chu, Land Registrar
- Key document: Land Registration Ordinance (Cap. 128)
- Website: Official website

Land Registry
- Traditional Chinese: 土地註冊處
Transcriptions
Yue: Cantonese
- Yale Romanization: Tóu deih jyu caak chyú
- Jyutping: Tou^{2} dei^{6} zyu^{3} caak^{3} cyu^{2}

In Hong Kong, the Land Registry is a government department under the Development Bureau responsible for the administration of land registration. It also provides facilities for search of the Land Register and related records by the public and other government departments.

== History ==
In April 2021, local media reported that the Land Registry potentially would have its data restricted to the public, similar to the Companies Registry. In response, a spokesman for the Liber Research Community said that such changes would hinder its ability to detect misuse of land, and that public data is essential and "will reveal a lot about the activities of the property developers in snapping up the land and hording these valuable resources. Only through this channel could we know about what's actually happening there; without this information such kinds of investigation or research would be impossible."

In October 2021, the government announced that the system would require users to enter in their ID and other information.

== Duties ==
- Registration of relevant documents under the Land Registry Ordinance
- Offer search and registration services
- Registration of Owners' Corporations under the Building Management Ordinance

== Addresses ==
Citizens may go to the customer service centre in Admiralty or any of the four centres in the New Territories to search and register property, as well as order photocopies of Hong Kong property documents.

- Queensway Government Offices on 66 Queensway, Admiralty
- New Territories search centres:
  - Tsuen Wan: 11/F, Tsuen Wan MTR Station multi-storey carpark, 174-208 Castle Peak Road
  - Yuen Long: 7/F, Yuen Long Government Offices
  - Sha Tin: Room 901, 9/F, Sha Tin Government Offices
  - Tuen Mun: 5/F, Tuen Mun Government Offices
  - Tai Po: 4/F, Tai Po Complex
