= James William Norton-Kyshe =

British barrister and legal author

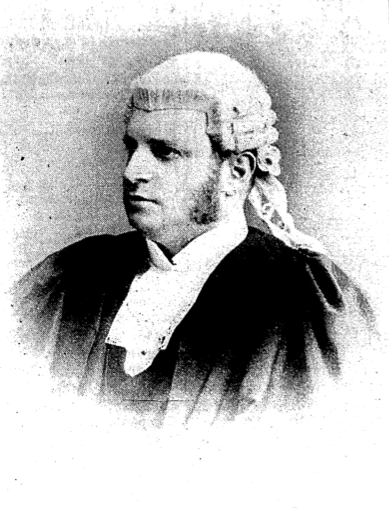
James William Norton-Kyshe, British barrister and legal scholar

James William Norton-Kyshe (1855–1920) was a British barrister and legal author. The Registrar of the Supreme Court of Hong Kong from 1895 to 1904, he published a number of law books including the compendious and oft-cited History of the Laws and Courts of Hong Kong (1898).

== Early life ==
Norton-Kyshe was born in 1855, the second son of Henry Kyshe and Esther Norton.

== Career ==
Norton-Kyshe commenced work as a clerk in the office of his stepfather, James Henry Slade, a solicitor. In 1871, at the age of 16, he entered the Colonial Service as a clerk to the Procureur General and Advocate General of Mauritius. After holding various appointments in Mauritius, he was promoted to the position of Deputy Registrar in Penang. He passed exams in both written and spoken Malay.

He was called to the Bar by Lincoln's Inn in 1888. In 1892, he was appointed Sheriff of Singapore and, in 1895, Registrar of the Supreme Court of Hong Kong. He was compulsorily retired over allegations of misconduct in 1904 and returned to England.

== Later life and death ==
Norton-Kyshe appears to have ceased publishing after his retirement. He died on 1 March 1920, four years after his estate had gone into administration under the Lunacy Acts.

== Books ==
Norton-Kyshe was a prodigious author and published the following books:

- Cases Heard and Determined in Her Majesty's Supreme Court of the Straits Settlements, 1808–1884. Edited and reported with a Judicial-historical Preface from 1786 to 1885 by James William Norton Kyshe, Esq., Acting Registrar of the Said Court in Malacca. In Three Volumes. Vol. I. Civil Cases, Singapore: Singapore and Straits Printing Office, 1885, OCLC 561158101.
- Cases Heard and Determined in Her Majesty's Supreme Court of the Straits Settlements, 1808–1884. Edited and reported with a Judicial-historical Preface from 1786 to 1885 by James William Norton Kyshe, Esq., Acting Registrar of the Said Court in Malacca. In Three Volumes. Vol. II. Criminal Rulings, Admiralty, Bankruptcy, Ecclesiastical and Habeas Corpus Cases, Singapore: Singapore and Straits Printing Office, c. 1885, OCLC 561158101.
- Cases Heard and Determined in Her Majesty's Supreme Court of the Straits Settlements, 1808–1884. Edited and reported with a Judicial-historical Preface from 1786 to 1885 by James William Norton Kyshe, Esq., Acting Registrar of the Said Court in Malacca. In Three Volumes. Vol. III. Magistrates' Appeals, Singapore: Singapore and Straits Printing Office, 1886, OCLC 561158101.
- Cases Heard and Determined in Her Majesty's Supreme Court of the Straits Settlements, 1808–1890. Edited and reported with a Judicial-historical Preface from 1786 to 1890 and the Rules and Orders of Court in Force by James William Norton Kyshe, Esq., of Lincoln's Inn, Barrister-at-law, Acting Registrar of the Said Court and Commissioner of the Court of Requests in Malacca. Vol. IV. Civil, Ecclesiastical, Habeas Corpus, Admiralty and Bankruptcy Cases. Criminal Rulings and Magistrates' Apeals, Singapore: Singapore and Straits Printing Office, 1890.
- The Law and Privileges Relating to the Attorney-General and Solicitor-General of England, with a History from the Earliest Periods and a Series of King's Attorneys and Attorneys and Solicitors-General from the reign of Henry III. to the 60th of Queen Victoria, London: Stevens and Haynes, 1897, OCLC 60730610.
- The History of the Laws and Courts of Hong Kong: Tracing Consular Jurisdiction in China and Japan and including Parliamentary Debates: And the Rise, Progress, and Successive Changes in the Various Public Institutions of the Colony from the Earliest Period to the Present Time, London: T. Fisher Unwin, 1898, OCLC 744934387, 2 volumes.
- The Law and Privileges Relating to Colonial Attorneys-General and to the Officer Corresponding to the Attorney-General of England in the United States of America, London: Stevens and Haynes, 1900, OCLC 39772065.
- The Law and Customs Relating to Gloves, being an Exposition Historically Viewed of Ancient Laws, Customs, and Uses in respect of Gloves, and of the Symbolism of the Hand and Glove in Judicial Proceedings, London; Hong Kong: Stevens and Haynes; Kelly and Walsh, 1901, OCLC 6517978, archived from the original on 18 December 2013.
- The Dictionary of Legal Quotations; or, Selected Dicta of English Chancellors and Judges from the Earliest Periods to the Present Time. Extracted Mainly from Reported Decisions, and Embracing many Epigrams and Quaint Sayings, London: Sweet & Maxwell, 1904, OCLC 449660.

== See also ==
- The Dictionary of Legal Quotations
