= The Dictionary of Legal Quotations =

The Dictionary of Legal Quotations is a dictionary of quotations compiled by James William Norton-Kyshe and published in 1904.

When this book was first published it was "quite a novelty among legal publications". There was no existing compilation of quite the same character. The "value and interest" of the learning contained in this collection is "for the scholar rather than for the active practitioner".

The Law Quarterly Review said "This book is not an index of such formulas or phrases as are most commonly cited in English-speaking courts of law, but a commonplace book of judicial or sometimes extra-judicial dicta, arranged with a view to recreation rather than professional utility."

It was reprinted by Gale Research in Detroit in 1968.
