= Companies Registry =

Hong Kong government department

- 公司註冊處
- Emblem of the Hong Kong SAR

Agency overview
- Headquarters: 14th floor, High Block, Queensway Government Offices, 66 Queensway, Hong Kong
- Minister responsible: Ms. Kinnie Wong, J.P., Registrar of Companies
- Parent agency: Financial Services and the Treasury Bureau
- Website: cr.gov.hk

Companies Registry
- Traditional Chinese: 公司註冊處
Transcriptions
Yue: Cantonese
- Jyutping: Gung^{1} si^{1} zyu^{3} caak^{3} cyu^{3}

The Companies Registry (CR; Chinese: 公司註冊處) is a government department under the Financial Services and the Treasury Bureau of the Government of Hong Kong. Its responsibilities include the registration of Hong Kong companies and non-Hong Kong companies under the Companies Ordinance, open-ended fund companies under the Securities and Futures Ordinance and limited partnership funds under the Limited Partnerships Funds Ordinance. It administers the licensing regime for trust and corporate service providers under the Anti-Money Laundering and Counter-Terrorist Financing Ordinance as well as the licensing regime for money lenders under the Money Lenders Ordinance.

Its headquarters is located at Queensway Government Offices in Hong Kong Island.

== History ==
The previous form of the Companies Registry was formed in 1865 with the enforcement of the first Companies Ordinance which was based on the 1862 Act in the United Kingdom and was governed by the Registrar of the Supreme Court. Before 1865, the companies in Hong Kong were restricted by the British Law introducing from the 29 January 1841 by Sir James John Gordon Bremer and Captain Charles Elliot. However, the British Law was not designed for the nature of the economic system in Hong Kong.

Until 1949, the administration of the Companies Registry was passed to the Registrar General’s Department under the introduction of Registrar General (Establishment) Ordinance. In 1962, the Companies Law Revision Committee was formed to review and improve the company legislation in Hong Kong in order to establish a more comprehensive rules regarding to the characteristics of the Hong Kong economic environment.

After years of revision of the Companies Ordinance, a system of reserving company’s name had been introduced in Section 20A of the Companies Ordinance in 1977. The period of reservation for both newly established company and existing company was three months. Extending for extra three months of the period of reservation could be applied.

In 1984, there were major and important laws established by the Standing Committee. Power was given to the company by the Companies Ordinance to manage the operation of the company, the minimum number of individuals to establish a public company was reduced from 7 to 2, the explanation of a company limited by shares had been updated etc.

The Companies Registry was then established on 1 May 1993 headed by the Financial Services and the Treasury Bureau and the trading fund of the Companies Registry was set up on 1 August 1993, being one of the earliest government department which operated with trading fund.

In March 2021, the Financial Services and the Treasury Bureau proposed changes to the Companies Registry that would begin to restrict access to some of its data to the public. In October 2021, the government announced that the system would require users to enter in their personal information.

== Background ==
=== Past Secretaries ===
Title	Name	Term
Registrar, Supreme Court	William Hastings Alexander	29 April 1865 – 12 May 1876
Registrar, Supreme Court	Charles Bushe Plunket	12 May 1876 – 14 April 1880
Registrar, Supreme Court	Henry Frederick Gibbons	14 April 1880 – 27 February 1882
Registrar, Supreme Court	Edward James Ackroyd	27 February 1882 – 24 March 1893
Registrar, Supreme Court	Alfred Gascoyne Wise	24 March 1893 – 28 September 1895
Registrar, Supreme Court	James William Norton-Kyshe	28 September 1895 – 19 May 1904
Registrar, Supreme Court	Arathoon Seth, I.S.O.	19 May 1904 – 30 October 1909
Registrar, Supreme Court	Joseph Horsford Kemp	30 October 1909 – 15 August 1911
Registrar, Supreme Court	Hugh Adair Nisbet	15 August 1911 – 20 October 1928
Registrar, Supreme Court	Charles Alexander Dick Melbourne	20 October 1928 – 1 October 1929
Registrar, Supreme Court	Thomas Maynard Hazlerigg, M.C.	1 October 1929 – 12 October 1935
Registrar, Supreme Court	Ernest Philip Henry Lang	12 October 1935 – 21 April 1940
Registrar, Supreme Court	Lancelot Ruggles Andrewes	21 April 1940 – 1 May 1946
Registrar, Supreme Court	Henrique Alberto de Barros Botelho	1 May 1946 – 1 January 1949
Registrar, Supreme Court	Christopher Paul D’Amadai e Castro	1 January 1949 – 1 April 1949
Registrar General	Christopher Paul D’Amadai e Castro	1 January 1949 – 1 April 1949
Registrar General	William Aneurin Jones, J.P.	1 April 1949 – 1 August 1958
Registrar General	William Kirk Thomson, O.B.E., J.P.	1 August 1958 – 10 April 1968
Registrar General	Walter Hume, O.B.E., J.P.	10 April 1968 – 1 March 1976
Registrar General	Piers Jacobs, O.B.E., J.P.	1 March 1976 – 20 September 1982
Registrar General	Noel Martin Geesoni, O.B.E., J.P.	20 September 1982 – 1 May 1993
Registrars of Companies	Noel Martin Geesoni, O.B.E., J.P.	20 September 1982 – 1 May 1993
Registrars of Companies	Mr. Gordon William Ewing Jones, B.B.S.	1 May 1993 – 27 August 2007
Registrars of Companies	Ms. Ada Chung Lai Ling, J.P.	27 August 2007 – 4 September 2020
Registrars of Companies	Ms. Kitty Tsui	4 September 2020 – 24 July 2022
Registrars of Companies	Miss Helen Tang, J.P.	25 July 2022 – 2 July 2025
Registrars of Companies	Ms. Kinnie Wong, J.P.	3 July 2025 – present

=== Roles ===
- Registration for companies, limited partnerships, trust companies and registered trustees.

- Let public to access the information held by the Companies Registry.

- Make sure the registered company following the related Ordinances.

- Management of Trust or Company Service Provider’s licence.

- Give advice to the Government and the Legislative Council regarding to the company law.

== Companies Ordinance ==
=== 1865 – 1948 ===
The first Companies Ordinance was established in 1865 after the British colonized Hong Kong in 1842. The Companies Ordinance 1865 was written based on the 1862 Act in the United Kingdom which benefited the English companies to develop business in Hong Kong. It introduced numbers of rules regarding to the incorporation of companies, major restrictions were the minimum number of members to start a business, kinds of limited liability, name changing etc.

Till 1911, a new Companies Ordinance was issued under the 1908 Act in the United Kingdom. Major changing from the previous Companies Ordinance were lowering the minimum person of starting private company, penalties and restriction to company’s operation.

A revised 1932 Ordinance was formed with the Companies Act 1929 which was mainly to incorporate the rising of China companies.

=== 1948 – 1984 ===
In 1949, the 1949 Amendment Ordinance was constructed which let the companies in Hong Kong to expand and develop business outside the British-Hong Kong colony. The 1958 Ordinance was followed by the previous law, mainly to define “charitable purpose”, which the meaning was unclear before it.

Till 1970s, the Companies (Amendment) Bill gave power to the Companies Law Revision Committee which was aimed to protect the interest of the investors in Hong Kong by giving suggestion to revise the law from British so that the law could be more suitable for the socio-economic environment in Hong Kong. There were different versions of the Companies (Amendment) Bill in 1972, 1974, 1977, 1978 and 1979.

=== 1984 – 2014 ===
The Companies Law Revision Committee kept editing and improving the law under the introduction of the Companies (Amendment) Bill 1984. In the same year, the Companies (Amendment) Ordinance 1984 was published. Alternation of the memorandum, power of companies, definition of company limited by shares etc. were added into the Ordinance. the Companies (Amendment) Ordinance of 1990 and 1995 adjusted certain fee charges and started to introduce documents in Chinese.

In 1997, Hong Kong was officially handover to China from British colony, the Companies (Amendment) Ordinance of 1997 further translated the details of law to Chinese. A new function of deregistration was first introduced by the Ordinance 1999.

Until 2 July 2003, the Companies (Amendment) Ordinance 2003 established and the main change was the forbiddance of starting a company limited by guarantee with a share capital.

On 10 December 2010, a revised version, Companies (Amendment) Ordinance 2010 was introduced which the Ordinance gave a larger extent of power to penalize the violation of rules.

=== Since 2014 ===
The new Companies Ordinance 2014 which include 921 sections and 11 schedules was commenced on 3 March 2014. There were few changes on deregistration, General meetings, corporate director etc. Some details were extending the application of deregistration from private companies only to also companies limited by guarantee, the name of Extraordinary General Meeting was changed to General Meeting, lowered the restriction of corporate director which needed at least one director to one natural person.

== Services ==
=== New company registration ===
==== Local company ====
Local companies may be unlimited companies or limited companies. Two types of limited company are opened for registration in Hong Kong, company limited by shares and company limited by guarantee, depending on the purpose of starting a company. A company limited by shares is the most common type of company in Hong Kong. Three documents will be needed for the application, Form NNC1 for company limited by shares or Form NNC1G for company not limited by shares, a copy of the company's articles of association and a Notice to Business Registration Office (IRBR1). Certificate will be established once all the procedure completed. The fee of registering a company limited by shares would be HKD$1,720 and the price of registering a company limited by guarantee would vary from HKD$170 to 340 or even more, depending on the number of members the company has.

==== Non-Hong Kong company ====
All non-Hong Kong companies with a place of business in Hong Kong should register in the Companies Registry not later than one month after establishing that place of business in Hong Kong. Registration creates a branch of that non-Hong Kong company in Hong Kong. Application requires five documents, the Form NN1, a certified copy of the instrument defining the company's constitution, a certified copy of the company's certificate of incorporation, a certified copy of the company's latest published accounts and a Notice to Business Registration Office (IRBR2). Certificate will be established once all the procedure completed. The fee of registering a non-Hong Kong company will all be the same price of HKD$1,720.

=== Change of company name ===
==== Local company ====
Before starting the application, checking of the existing name of other registered companies may be needed as the Companies Registry will reject the request if the name has already been taken. There is a requirement for local companies to change the company name, they must qualify the “Special Resolution” and the intellectual property rights. Form NNC2 and a new name of company must be handed to the office of Companies Registry with HKD$295 either in electronic or hard copy within 15 days after the qualification of the above requirement.

==== Non-Hong Kong company ====
Checking of the existing name of other registered companies is also needed no matter the type of company to avoid being rejected. Two documents are required for registered non-Hong Kong company to change name, Form NN10 and a certified copy of any official document from the Government of Hong Kong. The fee of changing a non-Hong Kong company’s name is HKD$1425. Once the application is approved, the Certificate of Registration of Alteration of Name of Registered Non-Hong Kong Company will be issued by the Companies Registry.

=== Registration of documents ===
Annual Return and statutory documents are required for both non-Hong Kong and local companies to submit to the Companies Registry such as notice of appointment of receiver or manager, notice of mortgagee entering possession of property or notification of payment. The fee of them varies from HKD$40 to HKD$4,800.

=== Public Search Services ===
With the restriction of Companies Ordinance, Limited Partnerships Ordinance, Registered Trustees Incorporation Ordinance and Miscellaneous Incorporation Ordinances, information should be disclosed to the public in certain extent. Information of company and records of licensed money lender can be searched at the Cyber Search Centre located in the office of Companies Registry. Some of the searching are not charged which include company name, document index, register of disqualification orders index and register of charges index. For charged document such as principal account, directors index search or obtaining certificate etc. The price of these documents varies from HKD$9 to HKD$500.

=== Deregistration of a defunct solvent company ===
“Notice of No Objection to a Company being Deregistered” should be first applied from the Commissioner of Inland Revenue. After the authority approved the application. A Form NDR1 from the Companies Registry and the approval notice must be submitted with a fee of HKD$420 within 3 months from the approval.

== Current Organisation and Distribution ==
Office title	Officeholder
Registrar of Companies	Ms. Ada Chung Lai Ling, J.P.
Registry Manager	Ms. Marianna Yu Shuk Fong
Registry Solicitor	Ms. Kitty Tsui Lai Ching
Deputy Principal Solicitor	Ms. Ellen Chan
Business Manager	Mr. Richard So Shun Kin

== See also ==
- Government of Hong Kong
- Legislative Council
- Financial Services and the Treasury Bureau
