= High Court Building (Hong Kong) =

Building in Central and Western District, Hong Kong

Coordinates: 22.27824°N 114.16324°E

- 高等法院大樓
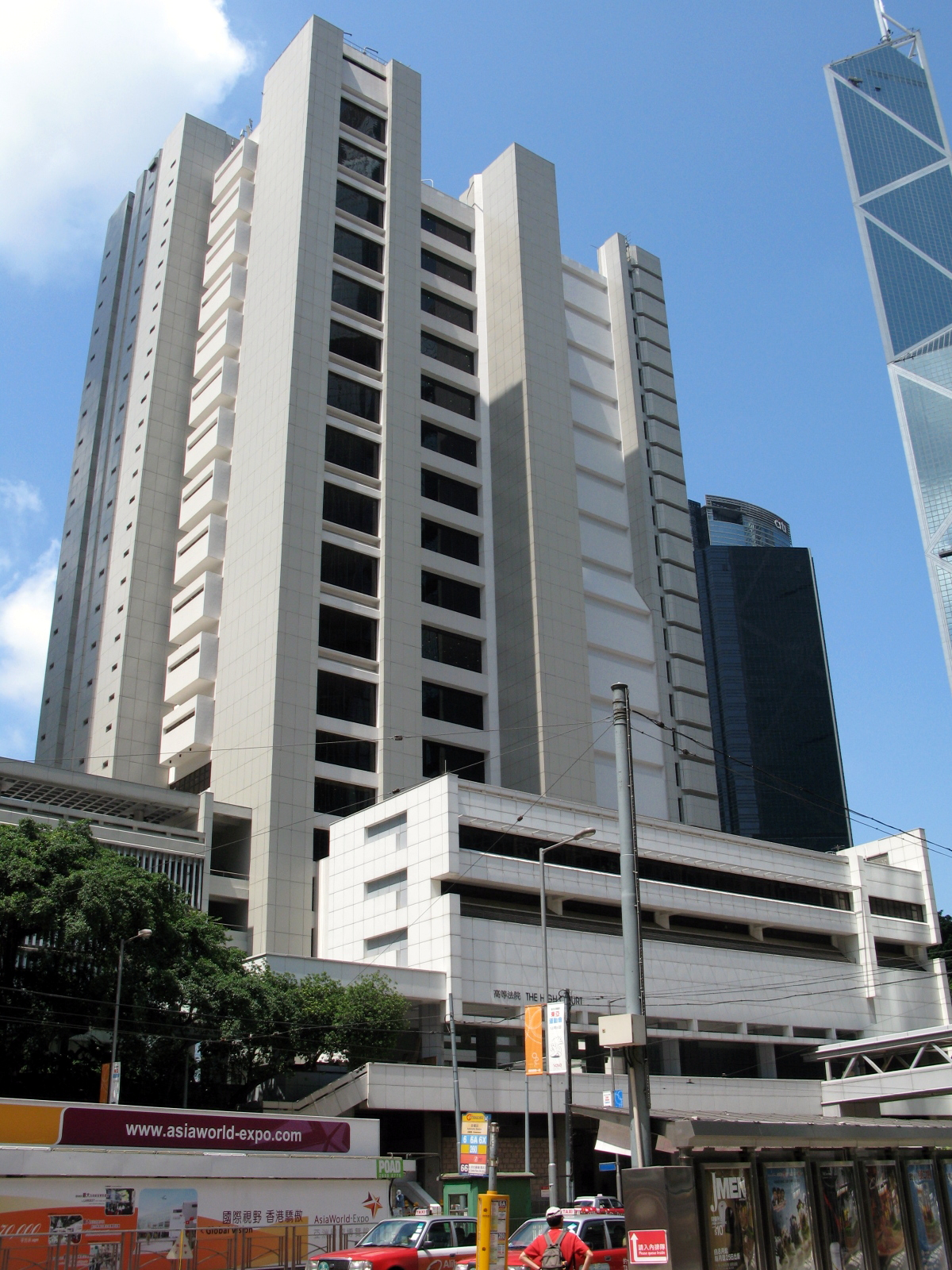
- High Court Building
- Interactive map of the High Court Building area
- Former names: Supreme Court Building

General information
- Status: Completed
- Type: Courthouse
- Location: Admiralty, 38 Queensway, Hong Kong
- Current tenants: High Court
- Completed: 1985; 41 years ago

Technical details
- Material: Concrete and glass
- Floor count: 20

Design and construction
- Architect: K. M. Tseng

Other information
- Public transit: Admiralty MTR

High Court Building
- Traditional Chinese: 高等法院大樓
- Simplified Chinese: 高等法院大楼
Transcriptions
Standard Mandarin
- Hanyu Pinyin: Gāoděngfǎyuàn Dàlóu
Yue: Cantonese
- Yale Romanization: Gōu dáng faat yún daaih làuh
- Jyutping: Gou1 dang2 faat3 jyun2 lau4

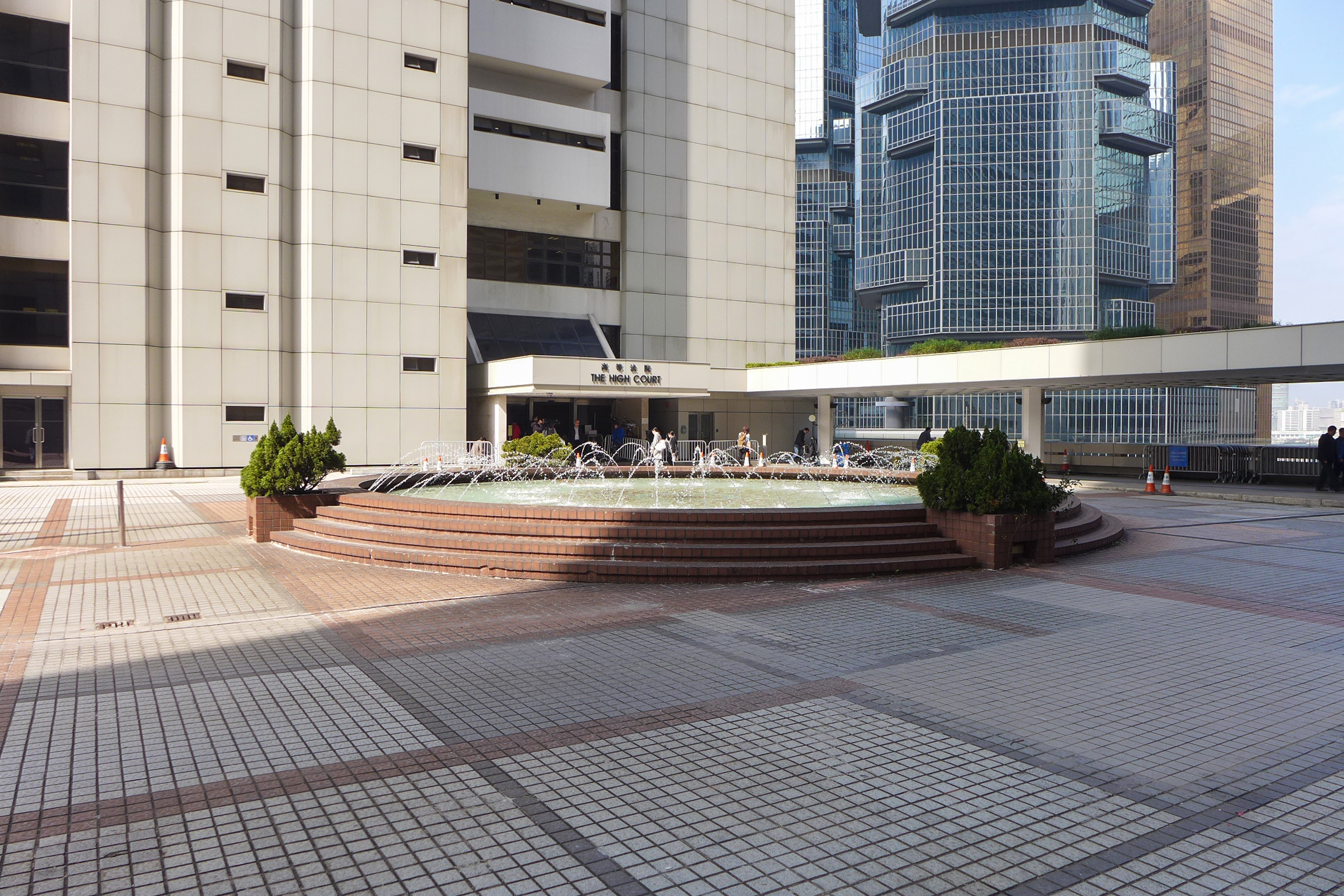
Entrance of the High Court in Admiralty

The High Court Building is the seat of the High Court of Hong Kong. It is located at 38 Queensway, Admiralty. The building was completed in 1985 as the home of the then-Supreme Court.

== History ==
The first-generation Supreme Court Building was located on Pedder Street in Central, where the China Building stands today. In 1912, the court moved to the newly constructed Supreme Court building on Jackson Road, where it remained until 1983, when it was temporarily moved to the former French Mission Building for emergency repairs caused by the construction of the MTR. The Supreme Court then moved to the present building, now the High Court Building, in 1985.

The Supreme Court Building was renamed the High Court Building in 1997 following the Handover of Hong Kong. However, the road leading to its main entrance still bears the Supreme Court name.

== Structure ==
The 20 storey building was built in 1985 as the home of the then Supreme Court of Hong Kong, which was renamed in 1997. The structure is a white clad tower and has a water fountain outside its front door. Demonstration and media coverage take place at the entrance of the building.

As of 2020, the building contains a total of 46 courtrooms, with plans to build an additional 6 civil courtrooms on the site of the High Court Library, which is to be relocated to the adjacent Queensway Government Offices.

== Proposed relocation ==
In 2017, the Judiciary announced plans to construct a new High Court building in the Central Harbourfront, next to the Legislative Council Complex.

In January 2024, the Chief Justice announced plans for the new High Court complex to be built on the site of the adjacent Queensway Government Offices instead, while retaining the current High Court site as well. The current High Court Building is expected to be demolished and rebuilt after the opening of the new premises.

== In popular culture ==
While filming in courtrooms is not permitted, the exterior of the building, in particular its forecourt and water fountain, is frequently featured in legal and crime-themed films and television shows set in Hong Kong. Films and television shows featuring the building include The Prosecutor (2024), A Guilty Conscience (2023), The Sparring Partner (2022), and Legal Mavericks (2017).
