= Registrar (law) =

Chief executive officer of a judicial forum

The registrar is a chief executive officer of a judicial forum. They are in charge of the entire registry of the department.

In common law jurisdictions, registrars are usually judicial officers with the power to hear certain civil matters such as interlocutory applications and assessment of damages. In some jurisdictions, they may also hear trials of cases if both parties consent. Registrars are assisted by deputy-registrars, who in common law jurisdictions are sometimes called masters.

The registrar is the chief administrator of the department, normally they happen to be the head of the department. The posts of the registrar are generally created in a judicial forums such as tribunals, high courts and supreme courts and in educational universities. In the judicial forum, they manage both administrative and judicial sides in departments under the authority of the president/chairman of the tribunals and chief justices of the high courts and supreme courts. The government may also appoint one or more assistant/deputy registrars. They help the courts, the registrar, the president/chairperson, and the judges in all their official/judicial functions. They are exercising delegated powers of the Registrar. They are guardian of the seals and responsible for the court's archives and publications.

The registrar is responsible for the administrative and judicial work as are assigned by the president/chairman/judges of the tribunal/court. In the event of necessities, the registrar may pass interlocutory orders for staying the proceedings as they deem fit until the appeal is heard by the other courts.

In other jurisdictions, the registrar exercises his powers with the change of nomenclature. Normally, the status of the registrar is equal to that of the district judge of Higher Judicial Service.

== Jurisdictions ==
=== Canada ===
In the Supreme Court of British Columbia, the Registrar of the Supreme Court oversees deputy district registrars who work in the various court registries in British Columbia. The deputy district registrars hold hearings and decide various registrars' matters; these include fixing party costs in court proceedings and settling the wording of a court order.

In the British Columbia Court of Appeal, the Registrar decides the contents of an appeal record, party costs and order wordings, when they are disputed by the parties in a proceeding.

=== Hong Kong ===
The Court of Final Appeal, High Court, and District Court each have a registrar, who is supported by deputy registrars. Registrars are judicial officers with case management powers and serve as masters in their respective courts. The magistrates' courts do not have registrars, but have registries, which are headed by senior judicial clerks, known as "first clerks".

=== Singapore ===
The Supreme Court Registry is currently headed by the Registrar of the Supreme Court. He is assisted by the deputy registrar, senior assistant registrars and the assistant registrars who perform judicial functions. Certain civil proceedings in the High Court, which are heard in chambers, are dealt with by the registrars.
