= William Hastings Alexander =

Hong Kong government official

William Hastings Alexander (c. 1823 – 22 February 1876) was a Hong Kong judiciary officer and acted in many positions including Colonial Secretary, Colonial Treasurer, member of the Legislative Council and Executive Council.

== Career ==
W. H. Alexander went to Hong Kong in 1845 as a clerk of the Supreme Court. He was appointed deputy-registrar in 1850 and subsequently registrar of the Court in 1856.

He acted as Chief Magistrate in 1860 and acted as Colonial Secretary from 1861 to February 1864 and again from 15 March 1865 to 11 March 1866. He also acted as Colonial Treasurer from 14 December 1867 to December 1868. In 1872, he was appointed to the Legislative Council as an unofficial member and to the Executive Council in 1875.

== Personal life ==
Alexander married Caroline Theophila Cole, the second daughter of John William Cole, on 19 July 1858.

Alexander died on 22 February 1876 at Chefoo.
