= Open-ended fund company =

Collective investment scheme

An open-ended fund company (OFC) (Chinese: 開放式基金型公司) is an open-ended collective investment scheme structured in the form of a company with limited liability and variable share capital. An OFC provides flexibility for investors (namely shareholders of the OFC) to trade their interests in the fund through the creation, redemption and cancellation of shares. OFCs could be set up as public or private funds in Hong Kong.

== History ==
The OFC structure was introduced in Hong Kong in July 2018 under the Securities and Futures Ordinance (Cap. 571). Historically, open-ended investment funds in Hong Kong were commonly established in the form of unit trusts but not in corporate forms. This is due to various capital reduction restrictions applicable in Hong Kong which restrict a company from reducing or making distributions out of its share capital unless certain procedures specified in the Companies Ordinance (Cap. 622) are followed.

As corporate fund structures are becoming more popular internationally, in 2014, the Financial Services and the Treasury Bureau (FSTB) published a consultation paper to consult the public on the proposed introduction of the OFC structure in Hong Kong to expand the city’s legal structure for investment fund vehicles. This proposal was made with a view to further developing Hong Kong as a full-service international asset management centre and a preferred fund domicile. Eventually, the OFC structure was introduced by the Securities and Futures (Amendment) Ordinance 2016 and the new OFC regime came into effect on 30 July 2018.

== Key Features ==
Unlike a unit trust which is essentially a trust arrangement, an OFC is a separate legal entity in corporate form. It has a board of directors who, though not required to be licensed with the Securities and Futures Commission (SFC), owe statutory and fiduciary duties to the OFC. The assets of an OFC will be segregated and entrusted to the custodian for safekeeping. An OFC is also subject to a mandatory requirement to delegate its investment management functions to an investment manager, who must be licensed or registered with the SFC for conducting asset management activities.

An OFC may be created as an umbrella fund consisting of a number of separately pooled sub-funds. Operationally, each sub-fund will be distinct, and the assets of each sub-fund will be managed according to the investment management policies and objectives specific to that sub-fund. Sub-funds will be subject to a “protected cell” regime which segregates the assets and liabilities of each sub-fund in order to minimize the risk of insolvency of a sub-fund affecting other sub-funds.

== Advantages ==
OFCs offer three main advantages. First, they allow for the redemption of shares from paid-up capital, thus providing for the first time a Hong Kong domiciled corporate vehicle suitable for open-ended investment funds. Secondly, as corporate vehicles, OFCs offer not only limited liability but statutory segregation of assets and liabilities between sub-funds so that the liabilities of one sub-fund cannot be satisfied from the assets of another sub-fund. Finally, as corporate vehicles, OFCs benefit from a wider range of exemptions from authorization by the SFC and thus, can raise capital more flexibly than unit trusts or limited partnerships.

== Key Regulators ==
Under the OFC regime in Hong Kong, the registration and regulation of OFCs will be overseen by the SFC. Separately, the incorporation and statutory corporate filings of OFCs will fall within the ambit of the Hong Kong Companies Registry.
