= Court of Final Appeal Building =

Home to Hong Kong's highest court

- 終審法院大樓
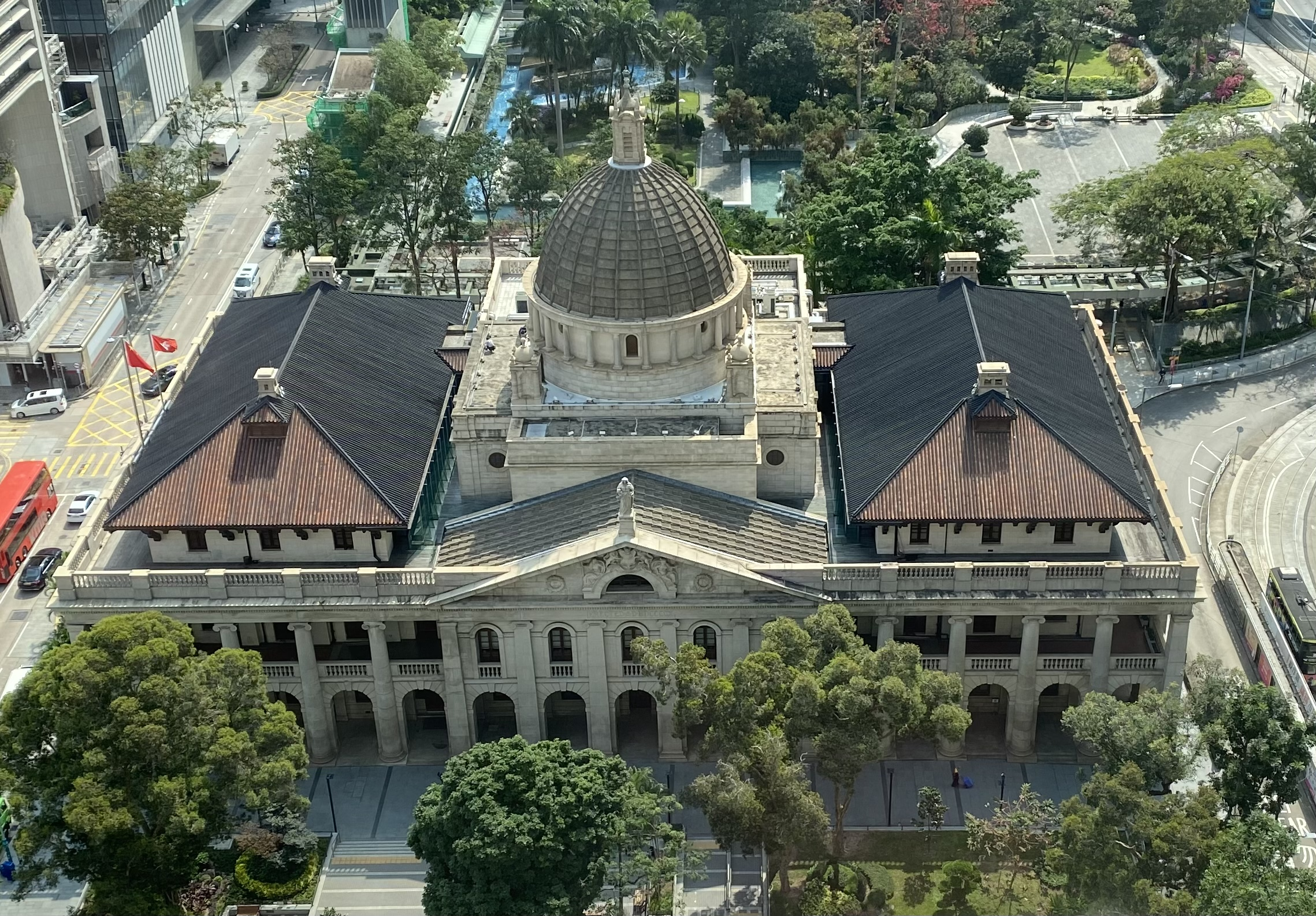
- Court of Final Appeal Building
- Interactive map of the Court of Final Appeal Building area
- Former names: Supreme Court Building; Legislative Council Building

General information
- Type: Court building
- Architectural style: Neo-classical
- Location: Hong Kong, 8 Jackson Road, Central
- Coordinates: 22.280996°N 114.160116°E
- Completed: 15 January 1912; 114 years ago
- Opened: 7 September 2015; 10 years ago (current use)
- Renovated: 2013–2015
- Renovation cost: $463.6 million HKD
- Owner: Judiciary of Hong Kong

Height
- Height: 40 m

Dimensions
- Diameter: 70 m × 38 m (230 ft × 125 ft)

Technical details
- Floor count: 3

Design and construction
- Architects: Sir Aston Webb; Ingress Bell

Website
- https://www.hkcfa.hk/en/visiting/cfa_building/index.html

Declared Monument of Hong Kong
- Official name: Exterior of the Old Supreme Court Building
- Designated: 1984

Hong Kong Graded Building – Grade I
- Designated: 1980

Court of Final Appeal Building
- Traditional Chinese: 終審法院大樓
- Simplified Chinese: 终审法院大楼
Transcriptions
Standard Mandarin
- Hanyu Pinyin: Zhōngshěnfǎyuàn Dàlóu
Yue: Cantonese
- Yale Romanization: Jūng sám faat yuhn daaih làuh
- Jyutping: Zung^{1} sam^{2} faat^{3} jyun^{6} daai^{6} lau^{4}

Old Supreme Court Building
- Traditional Chinese: 舊最高法院大樓
- Simplified Chinese: 旧最高法院大楼
Transcriptions
Standard Mandarin
- Hanyu Pinyin: Jiù Zuìgāofǎyuàn Dàlóu
Yue: Cantonese
- Yale Romanization: Gauh jeui gōu faat yuhn daaih làuh
- Jyutping: Gau^{6} zeoi^{3} gou^{1} faat^{3} jyun^{6} daai^{6} lau^{4}

On the south side [of Statue Square] stands the New Law Courts. It was designed in England, and the only feature of note is the inartistic roof. Like all buildings erected by the Government, the edifice has been in course of construction nearly 15 years, and is still not completed. All the granite used in the construction of this massive block of buildings is the product of the Island and the mainland.

— Picturesque Hong Kong: a handbook for travellers. Hong Kong: Tillotson & Sons. 1911. pp.67–68

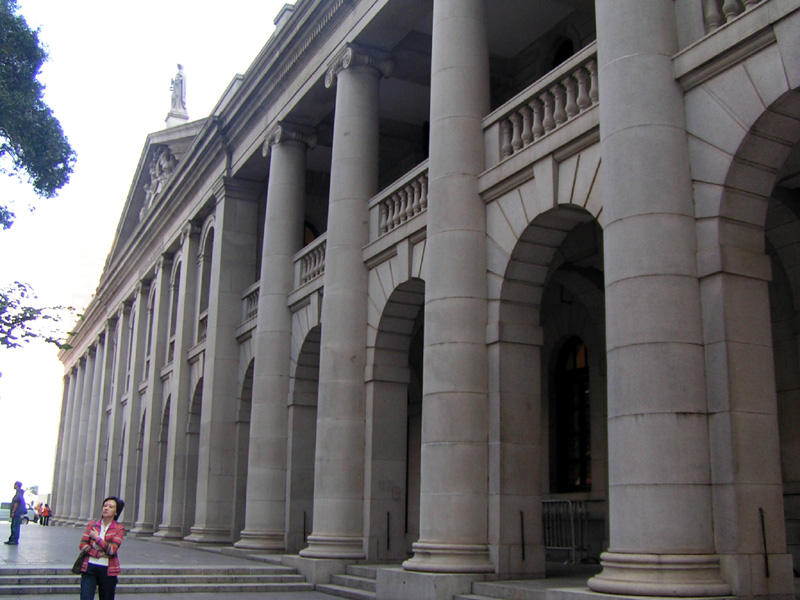
Classical architecture was used in the design of the building.

The Court of Final Appeal Building, also known as the Old Supreme Court Building, is located at 8 Jackson Road, in Central, along the eastern side of Statue Square, directly west of Chater Garden. It housed the former Supreme Court from 1912 to 1983 and the Legislative Council from 1985 to 2011. It is now the home of the Hong Kong Court of Final Appeal.

Completed in 1912, the building was designed in the Neo-classical style. Atop the building stands a blindfolded statue of Lady Justice, holding a pair of scales in her right hand and a sword in her left, symbolizing impartiality and fairness. Since 1984, its exterior is one of the declared monuments of Hong Kong.

== History ==
=== Construction (1900–1912) ===
The Supreme Court of Hong Kong was originally housed in a building at the junction of Wellington Street and Wyndham Street in 1844. In 1848, it moved to a two-storey building at 7 Queen's Road Central. After the completion of the Praya Reclamation Scheme in 1904, which created new reclaimed land along what is now Gloucester Road, a committee established by then-Governor Sir William Robinson recommended constructing a new courthouse and General Post Office (Note: Third generation of General Post Office (1911－1976) located at the junction of Pedder Street and Des Voeux Road Central. The site is now occupied by the World-Wide House.). The committee initially proposed holding a public design competition, but the government instead preferred to entrust the project to experienced architects. The commission was ultimately awarded to Sir Aston Webb and Ingress Bell, the British architects responsible for the eastern façade of Buckingham Palace and the Cromwell Road frontage of the Victoria and Albert Museum in London.

On 28 February 1898, the Legislative Council approved the construction of the new building. The design underwent several revisions. For example, the main façade was reoriented from facing the Hong Kong Cricket Club (now Chater Garden) on the east to facing Statue Square on the west. The Public Works Department also modified the plans by adding a basement to accommodate a heating system. The final design was completed in 1899.

In 1899, workers first had to remove the old seawall along the original shoreline, and pile-driving progressed slowly. Construction of the building officially began in 1900, and by April 1903, they had completed the foundation using 1,447 fir timber piles. The foundation stone was laid on 12 November 1903 by Governor Sir Henry Arthur Blake. Owing to shortages of skilled stonemasons and suitable granite, construction was delayed until 1911.

The Supreme Court building was officially opened on 15 January 1912 by the Governor Sir Frederick Lugard. The two-storey granite building is neo-classical in style supported by Ionic columns. It is surmounted by a 2.7 m high blindfolded statue of Justice, represented by Themis, the Greek goddess of justice and law. This statue was inspired by the one erected at London's Old Bailey.

=== As the Supreme Court (1912–1941, 1945–1978, 1982–1984) ===
From 1912 to 1941, the building was used as the Supreme Court and as the offices of the Attorney General and Crown Solicitor. During the Japanese occupation of Hong Kong (December 1941 to August 1945), the building was used as the headquarters of the Kempeitai (Military Police). Following the Japanese surrender and restoration of British rule in 1945, the Supreme Court resumed use of the building, which was shared at various times with the Tenancy Tribunal, the Victoria District Court, and the Legal Department.

In 1978, this building was severely affected by the construction of the MTR, requiring restoration work. The changes in the groundwater level and the resulting subsidence created cracks in the building. As a consequence, the Supreme Court had to be relocated in July 1978 to the former Central Magistracy, the old Fire Brigade Building, and the Former French Mission Building, which was then used by the Victoria District Court. The building was given Grade 1 historic building status in 1980. The Supreme Court briefly reoccupied the building from 1982 to 1984 before moving to its current location in Admiralty in July 1984.

=== As the Legislative Council (1985–2011) ===
In 1983, the Executive Council authorised the conversion of the former Supreme Court Building into the Legislative Council Building, a move that was described by the then-Chief Secretary Sir Philip Haddon Cave as giving the Legislative Council "a new and clearer identity, emphasising its separation from the Executive Council and the Administration". The Architectural Services Department began the conversion works in 1984, the same year the exterior of the building was declared a monument.

The renovations involved the conversion of the court's library into the Council Chamber, the construction of a mezzanine floor to accommodate public galleries, and the conversion of courtrooms and ancillary rooms into conference rooms and a dining hall, with judges' chambers repurposed to become the offices of legislators.

In October 1985, the building took up service as the seat of the Legislative Council, when it was known as 'the Legislative Council Building', while the Supreme Court moved to the Supreme Court Building in Admiralty, which was renamed the High Court Building in 1997.

In 2011, the Legislative Council moved into the new Legislative Council Complex within the Central Government Complex at Tamar.

=== As the Court of Final Appeal (2015–present) ===
In March 2013, the Government submitted a proposal to the Legislative Council to relocate the Court of Final Appeal from its "manifestly inadequate" premises in the former French Mission Building to the old Supreme Court Building at 8 Jackson Road. The move, which was estimated to cost $463.6 million HKD, would double the net operational floor area of the CFA, and involve the construction of two courtrooms, two exhibition galleries, a library, and other facilities.

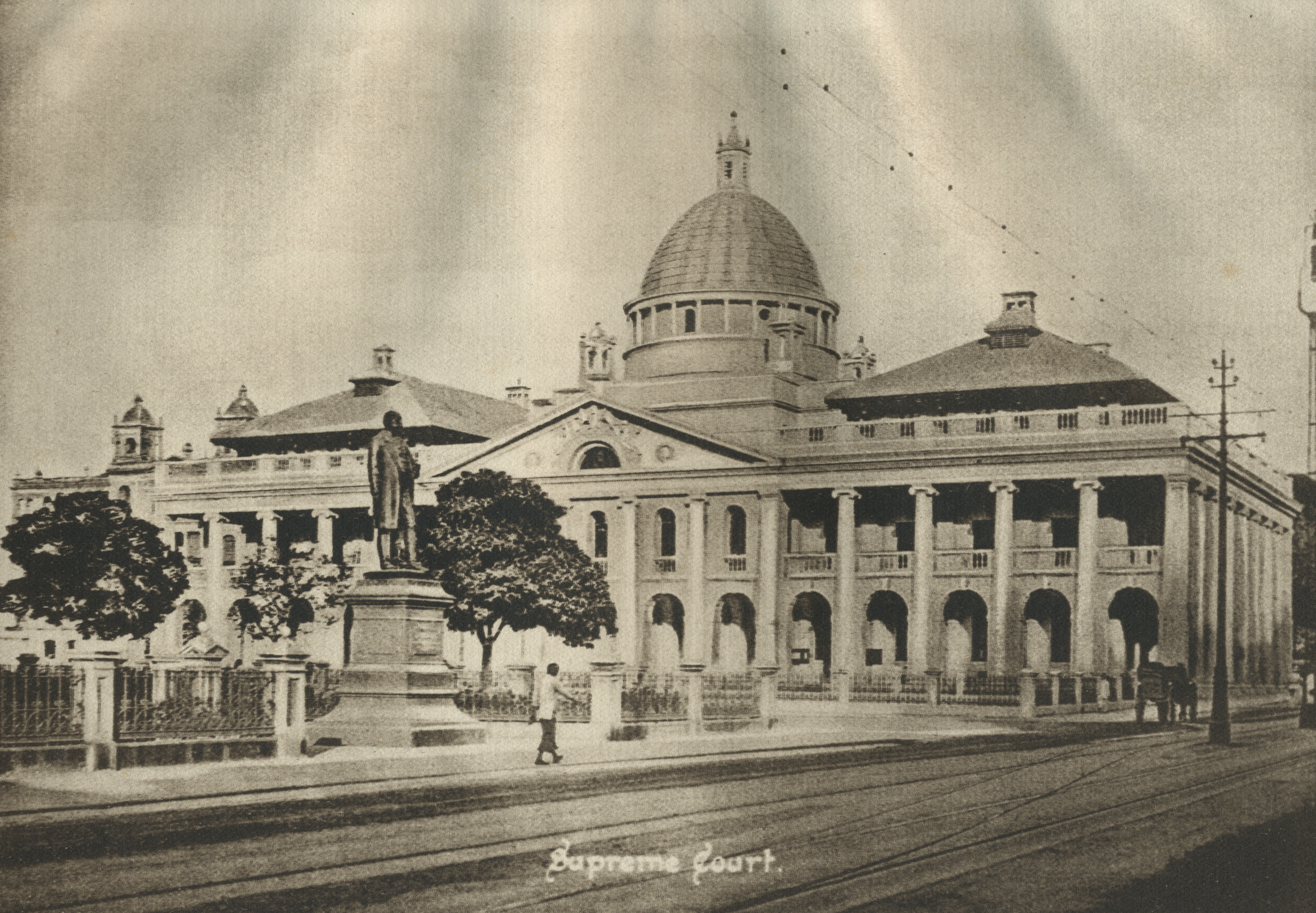
The building in service as the seat of the Supreme Court.

On 7 September 2015, the building reverted to its former judicial function. It now houses the Hong Kong Court of Final Appeal. The opening ceremony was held on 25 September 2015 by the Chief Justice of the Court of Final Appeal Geoffrey Ma Tao-li.

== Architectural features ==
The building was erected on reclaimed land. Its foundation was formed by driving hundreds of Chinese fir tree trunks into the mixture of reclamation materials and silt on the site. As a consequence, the building is in effect "floating" on a timber raft. Such a foundation system requires the groundwater level to be maintained at a constant level, and a groundwater replenishment system is installed to replace groundwater as required.

The plan of the building follows a rectangular pattern and is symmetrical. The building occupies an area of around 2,660 square metres (28,600 sq ft) (about 70 by 38 metres (230 ft × 125 ft)) and is surrounded by columns. Its height, fronze Tudor Crown, is about 40 metres (130 ft).

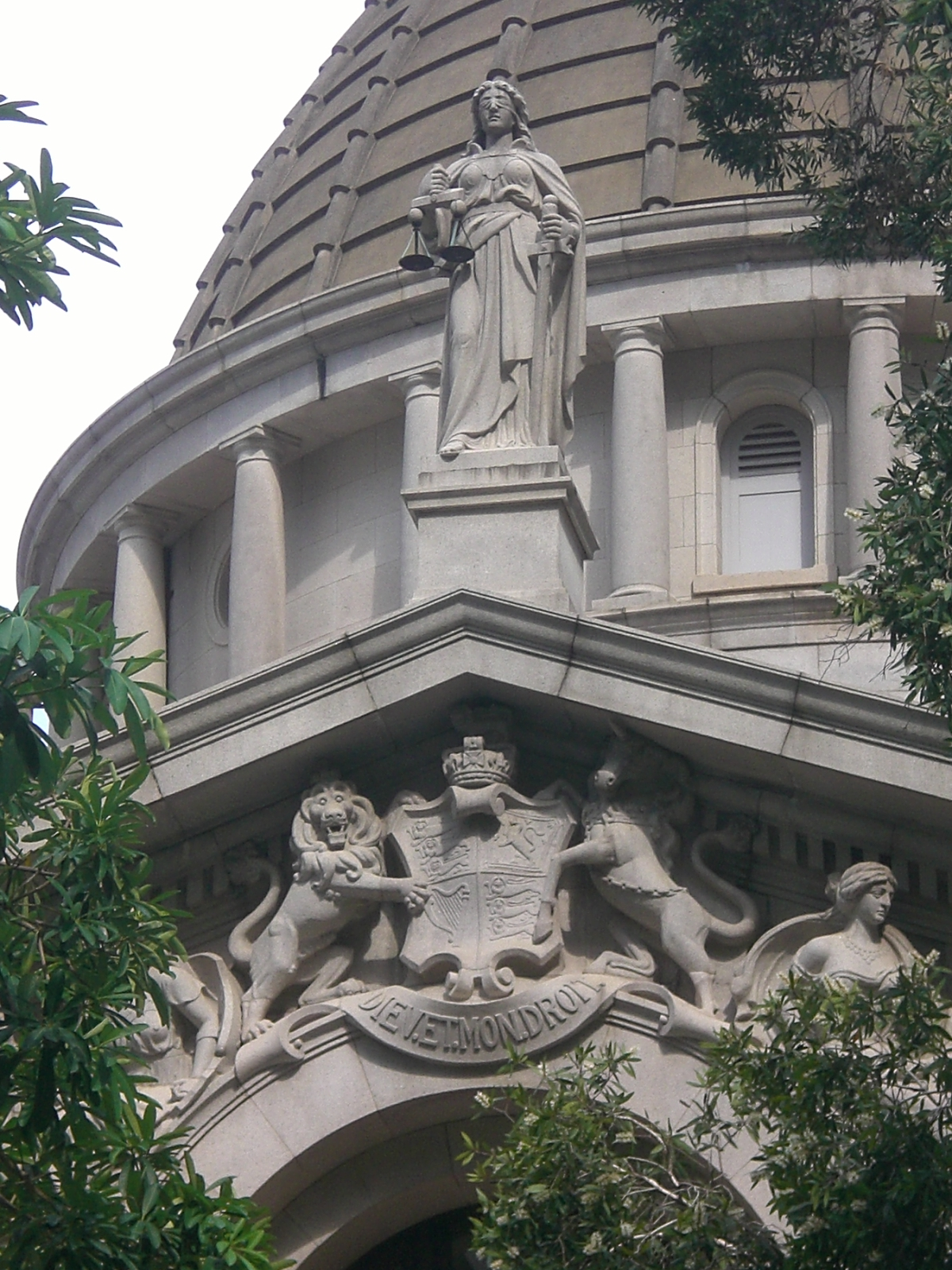
Themis and the royal coat of arms

A pediment surmounts the central section of the building facing Statue Square. The pediment is topped by a Statue of Justice and under it is the inscription "Erected AD MDCCCCX" (Erected AD 1910). The pediment incorporates a semi-circular window and the carving of the British royal coat of arms is above it. The shield shows the various royal emblems of the various parts of the United Kingdom: the three lions of England in the first and fourth quarters, the lion of Scotland in the second and the harp of Ireland in the third. The shield is supported by the English lion and Scottish unicorn and is surmounted by the royal crown. The motto of the sovereign, Dieu et mon droit (God and my right), is displayed underneath it. The figures of Mercy and Truth are located on both sides of the British royal arms.

== Gallery ==
=== Interior of the building as the Legislative Council Building (1985–2011) ===
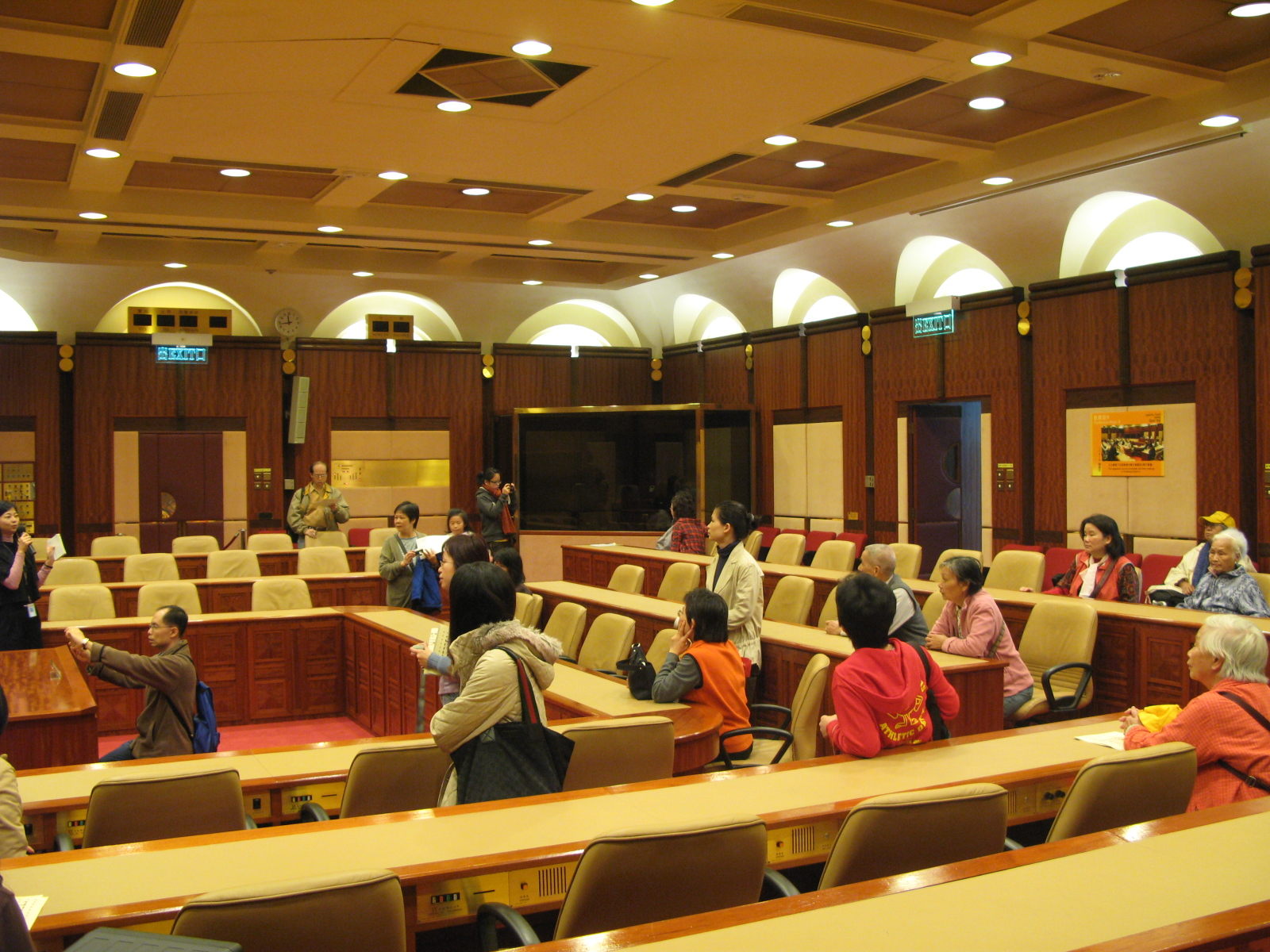
Conference Room A

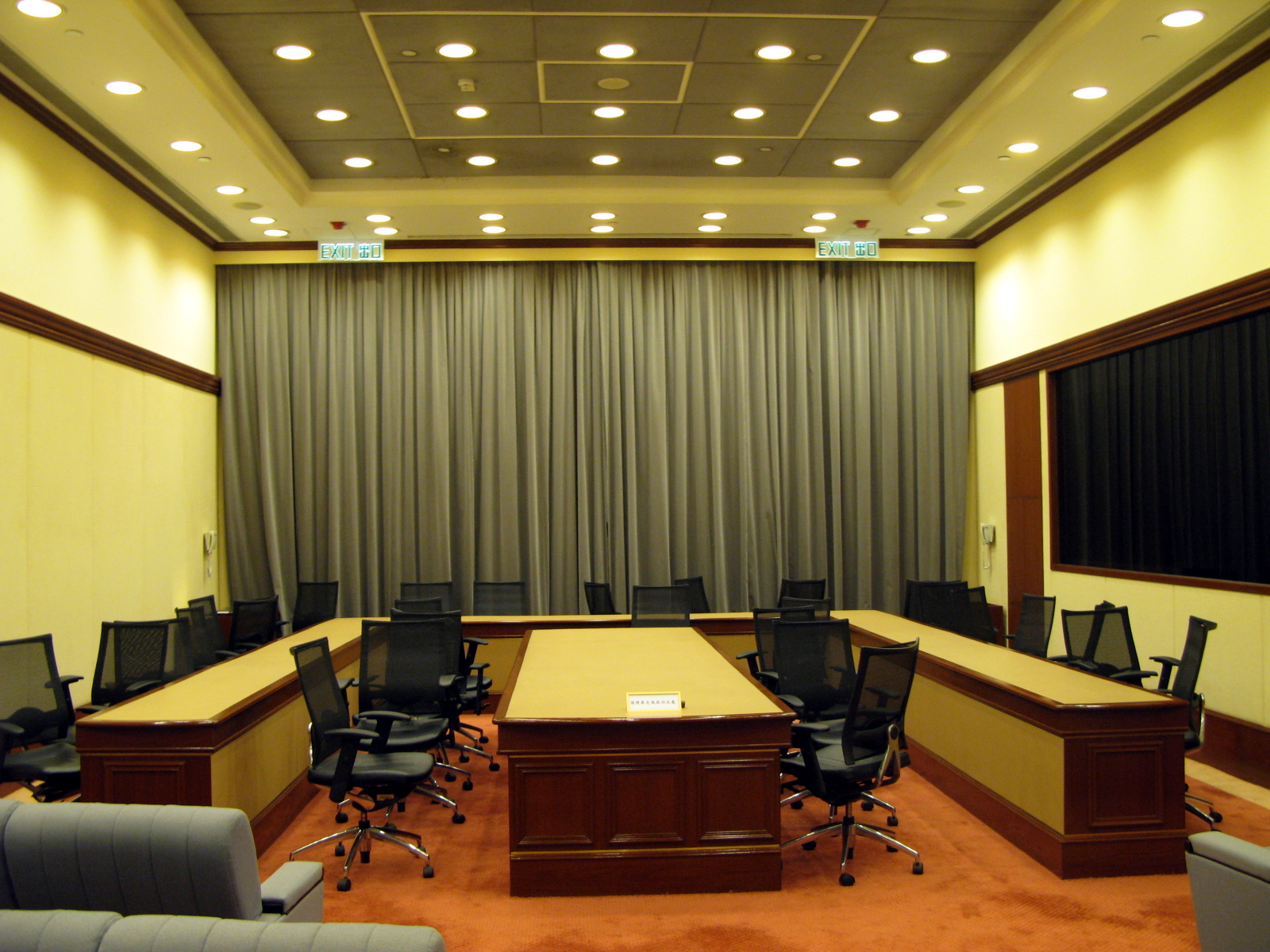
Conference Room B

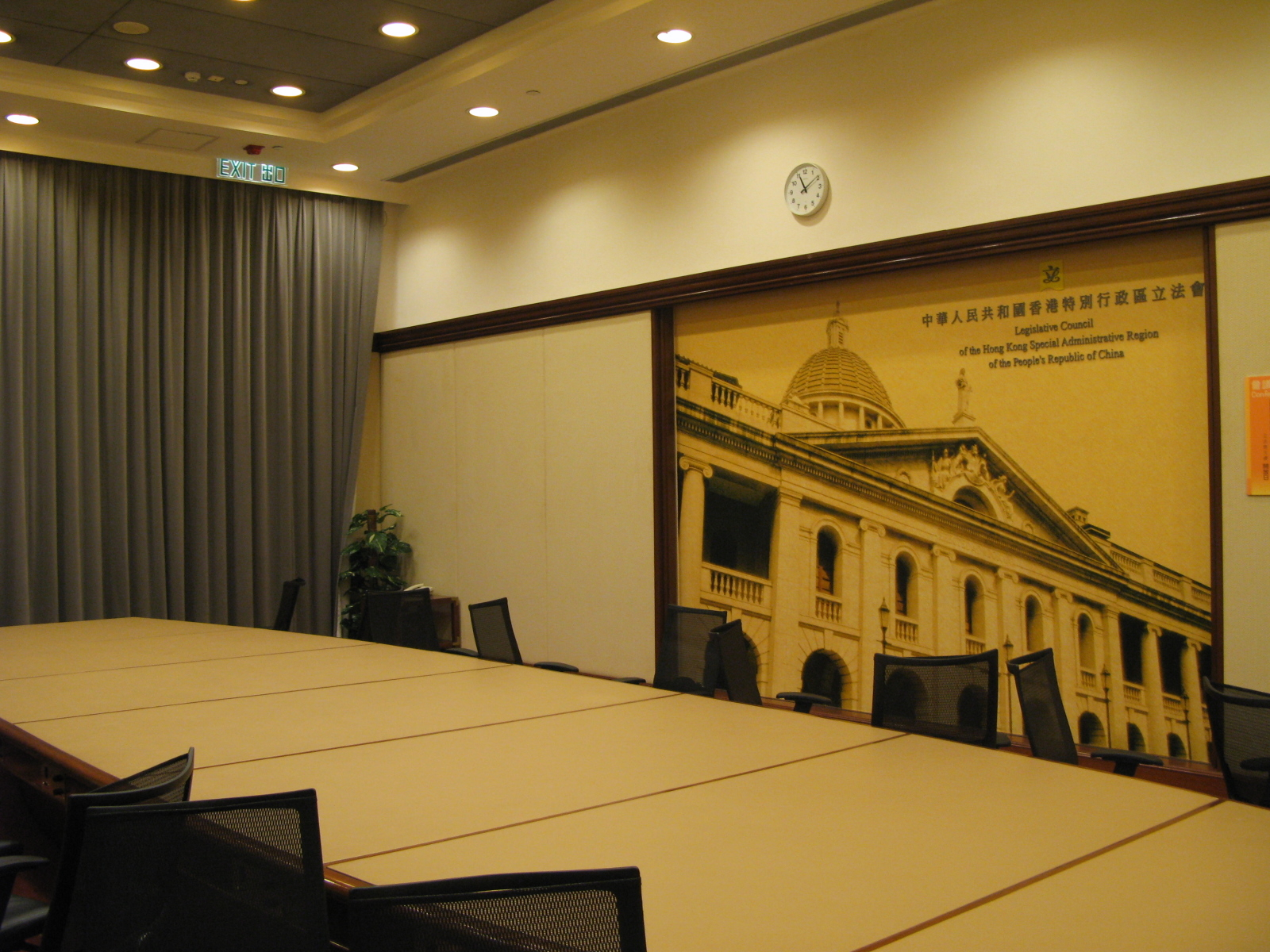
Conference Room C

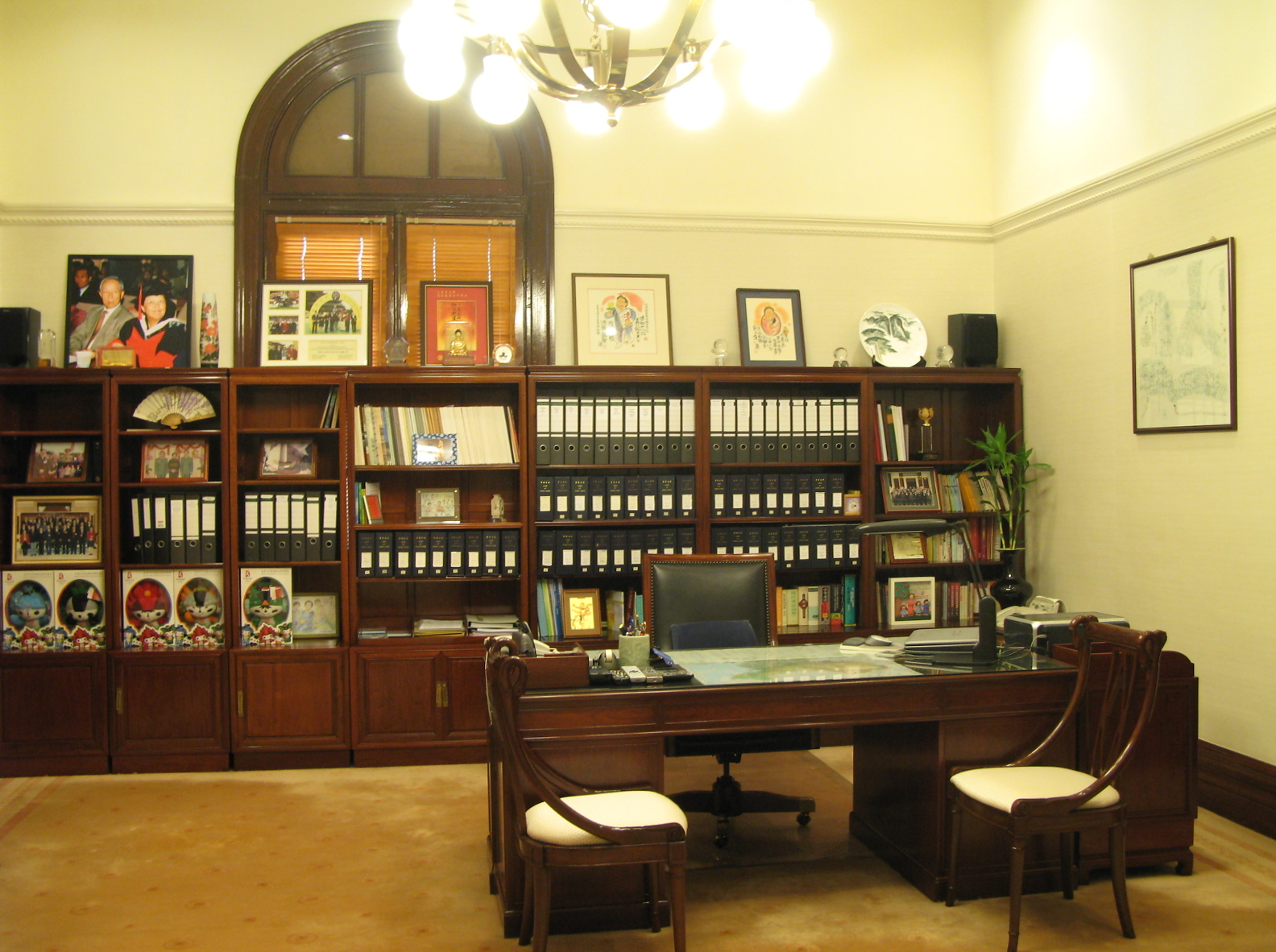
President's office

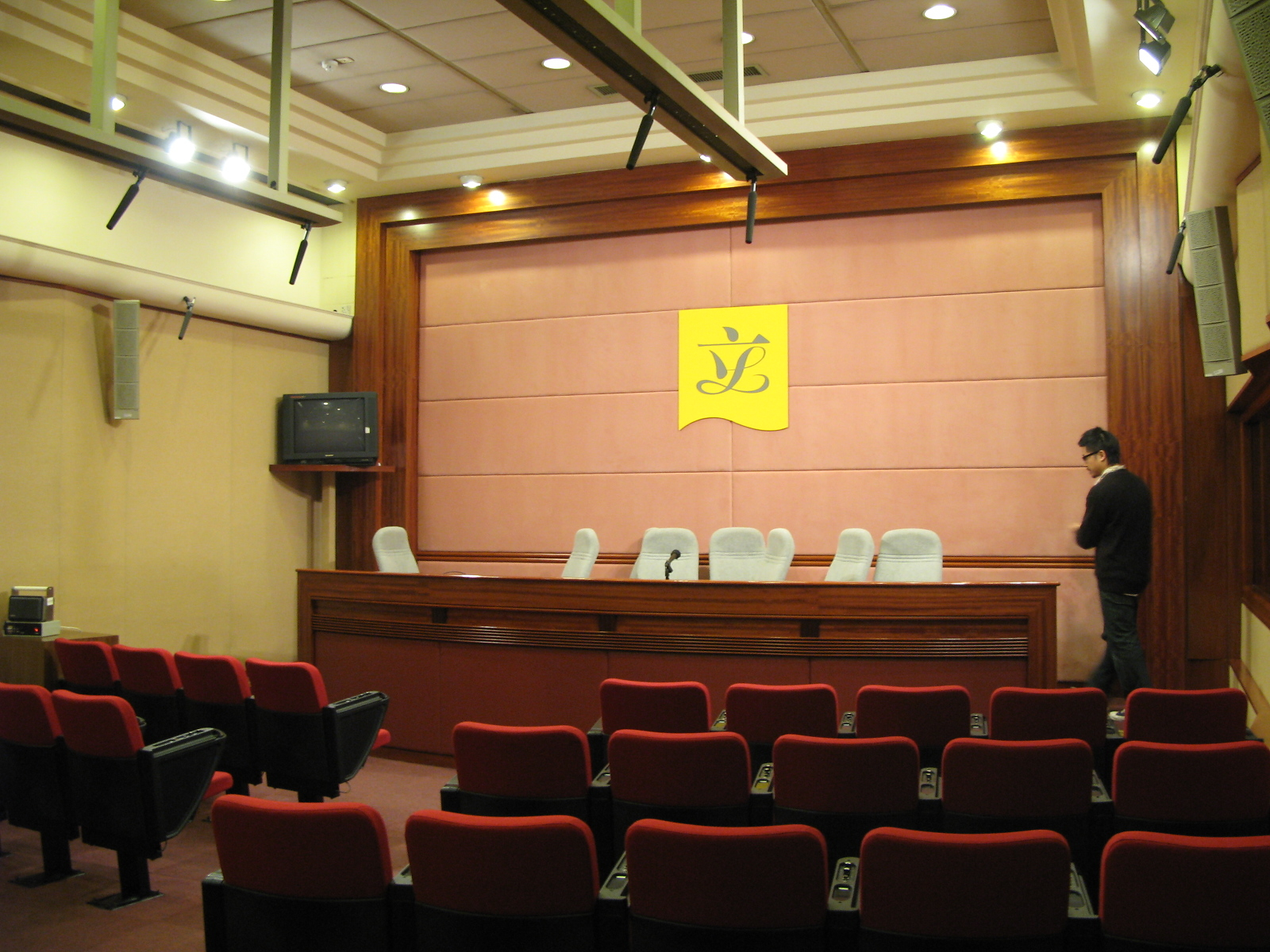
Press Conference Room

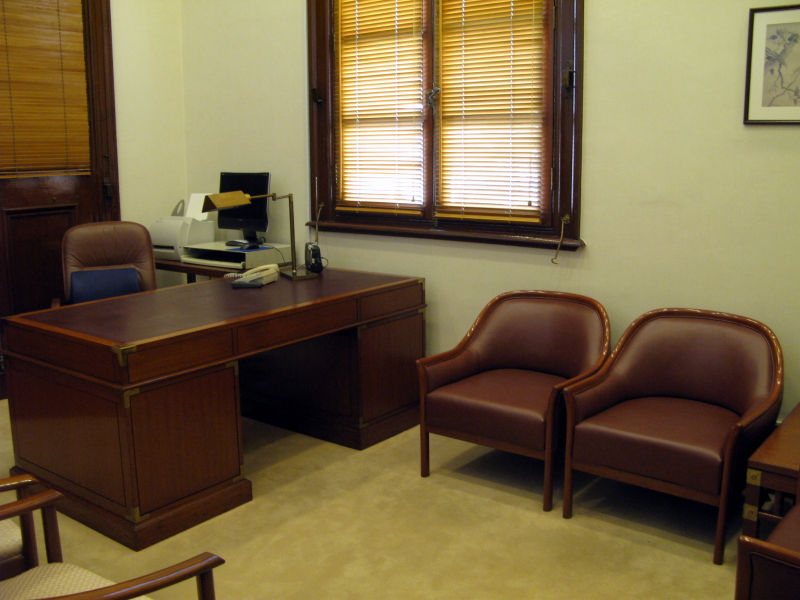
Office for the members of the Legislative Council

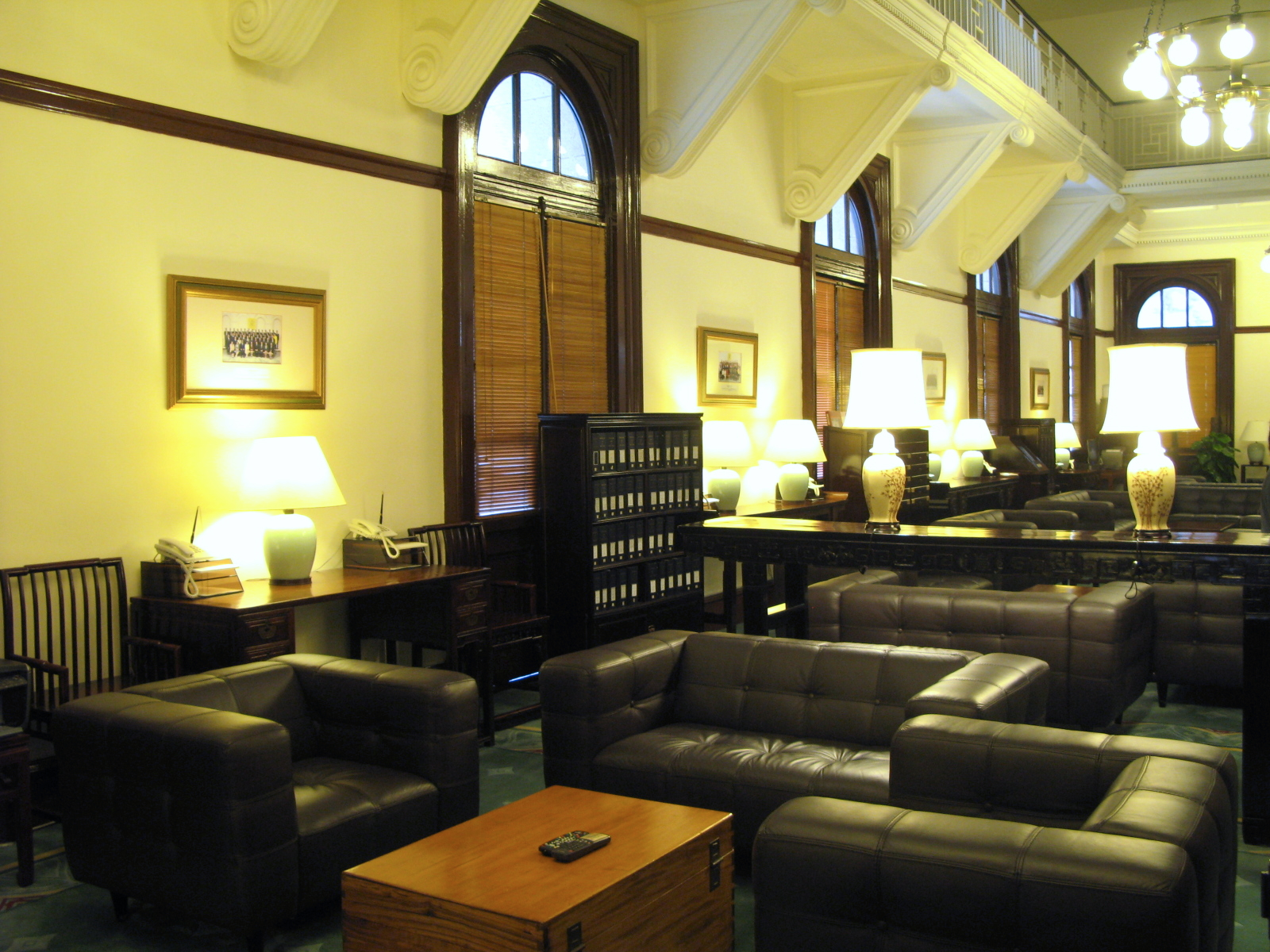
Ante Chamber

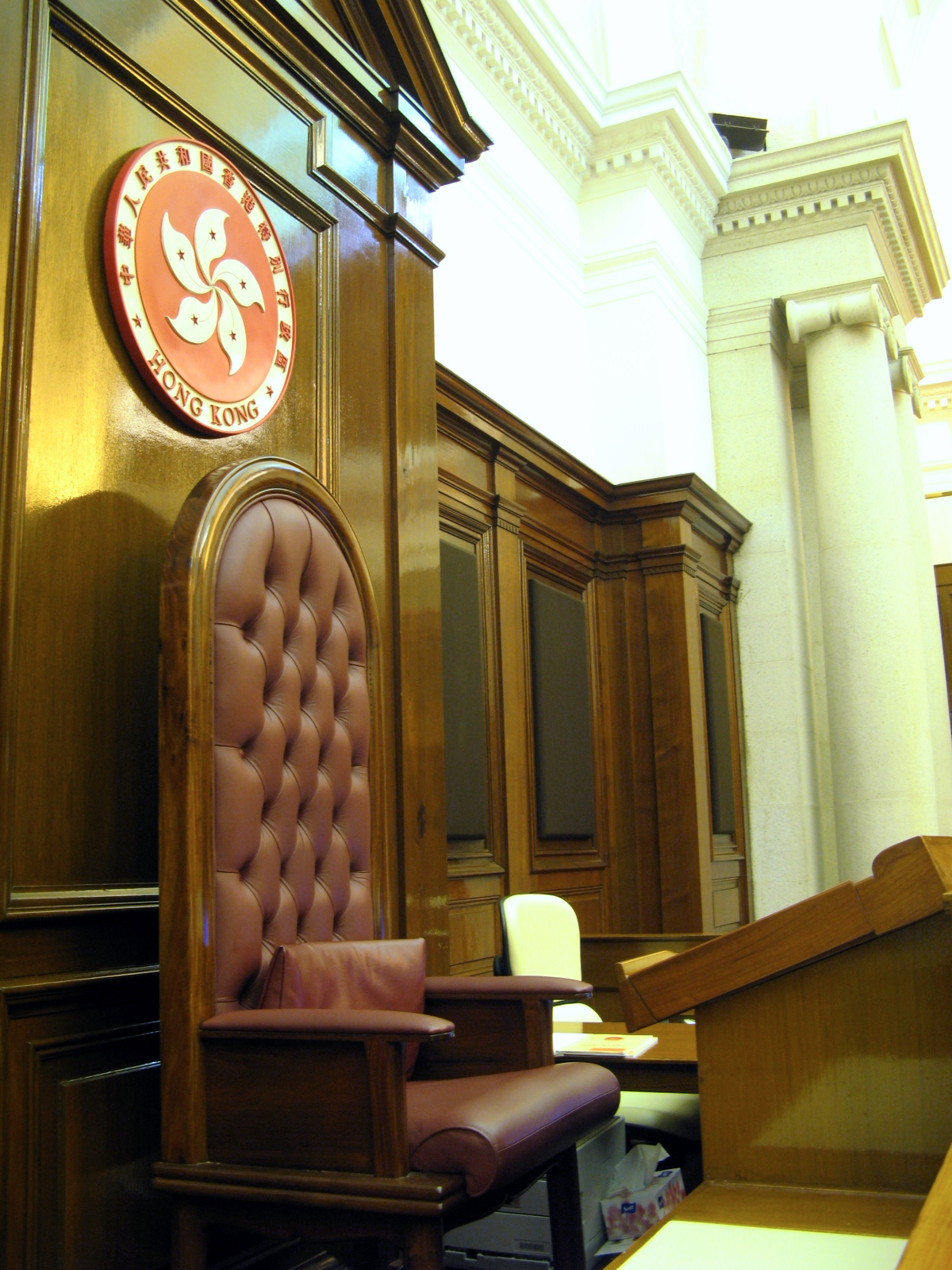
President's seat

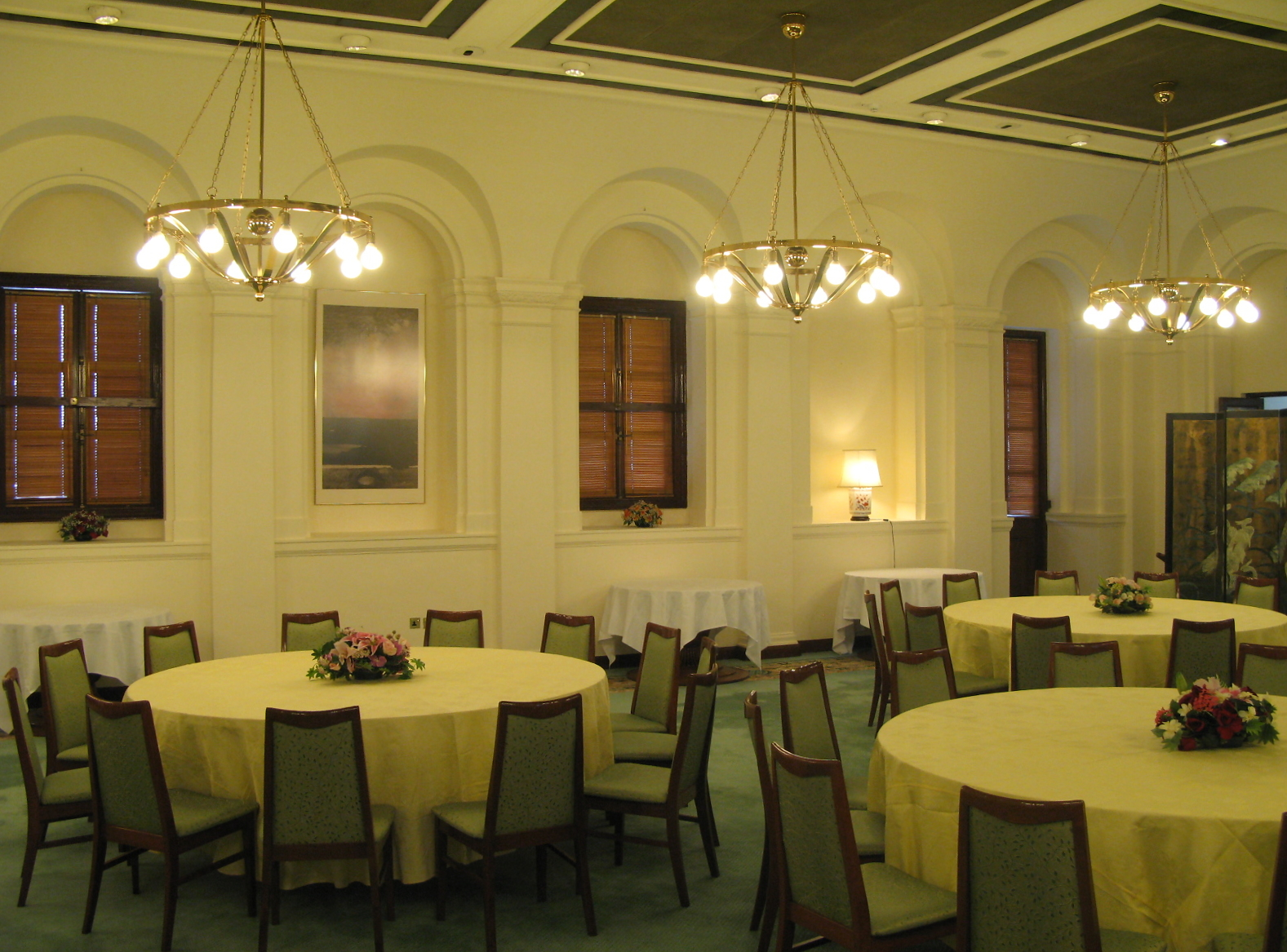
Dining Hall

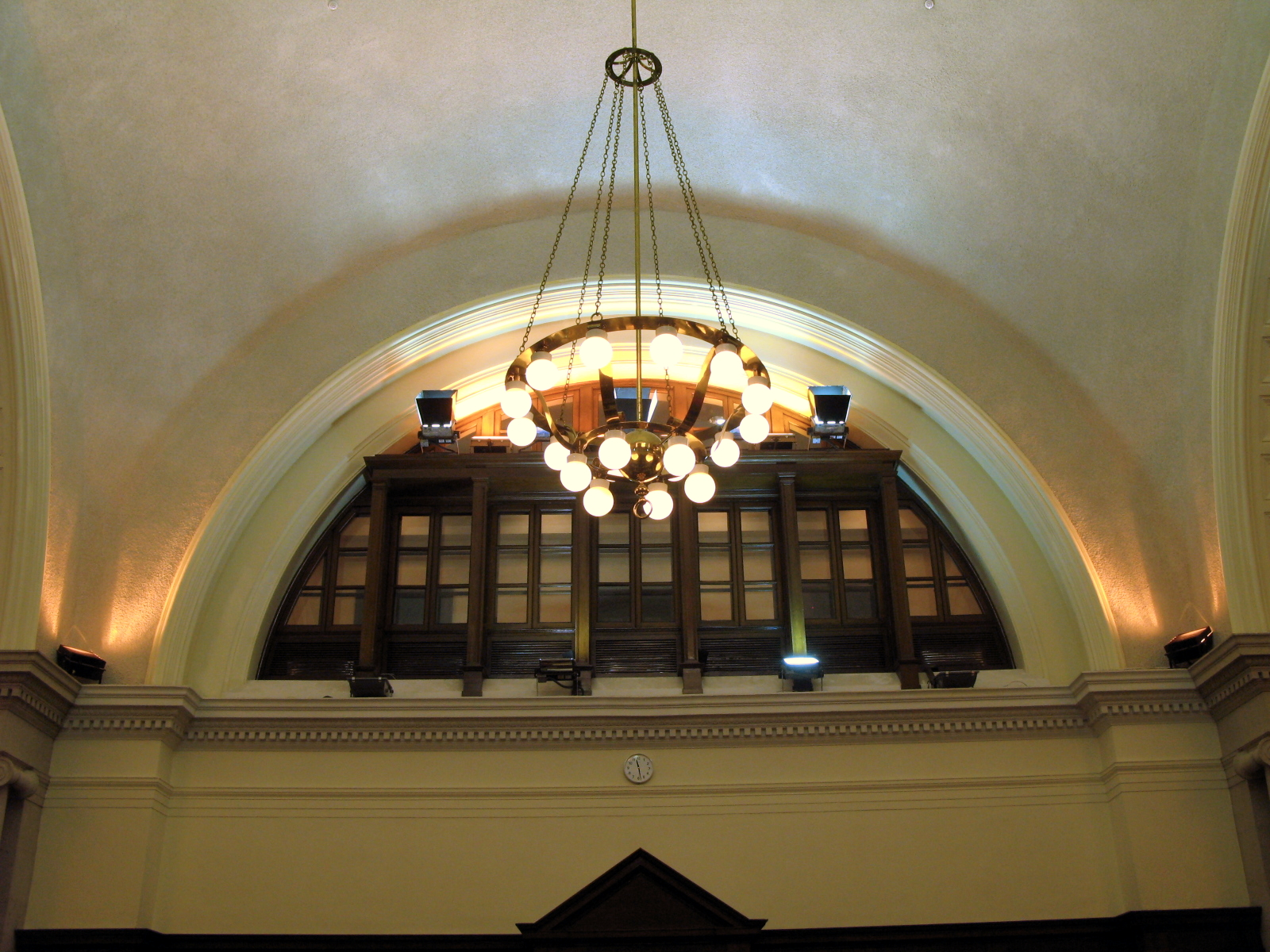
Ceiling of the Main Chamber

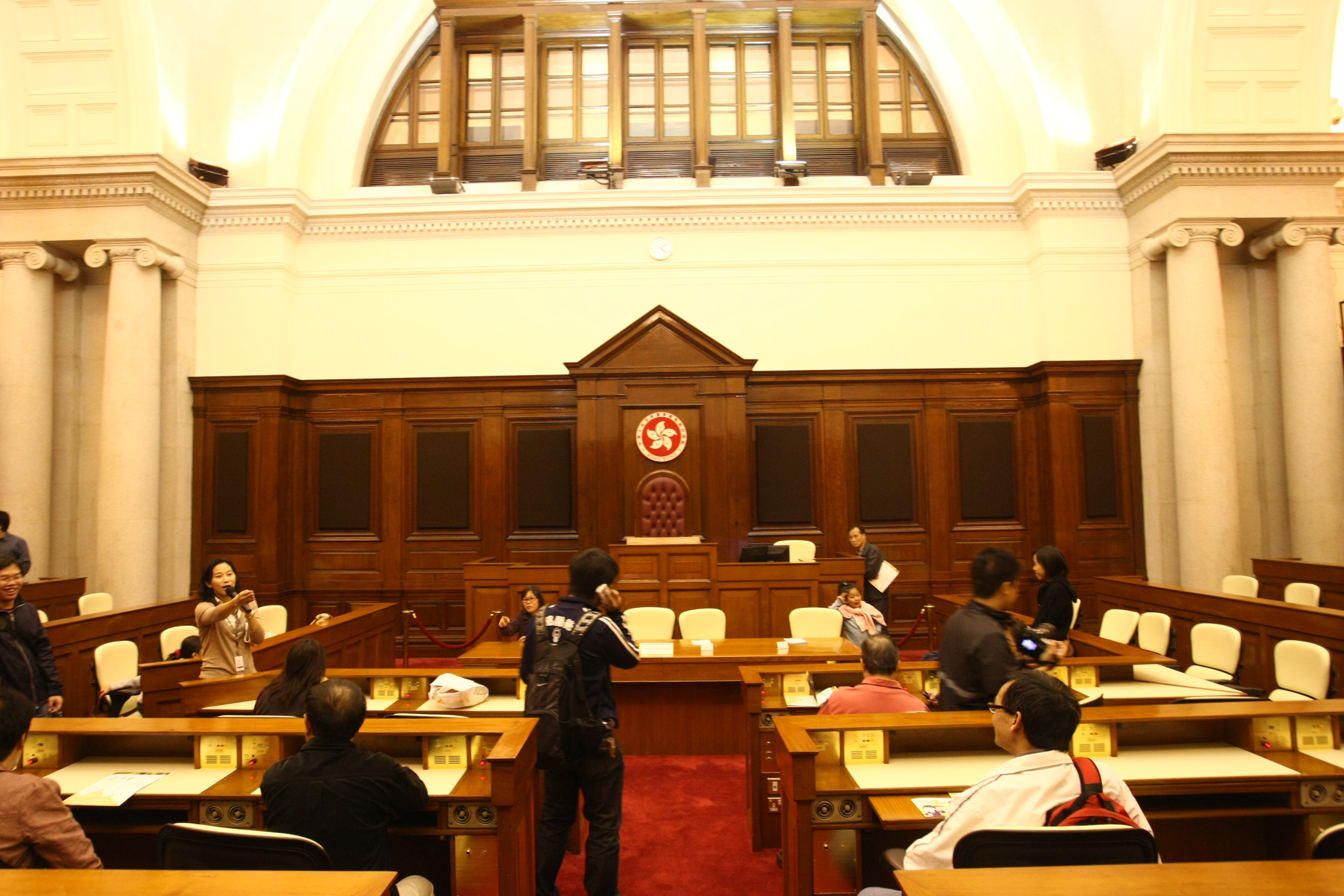
Chamber interior

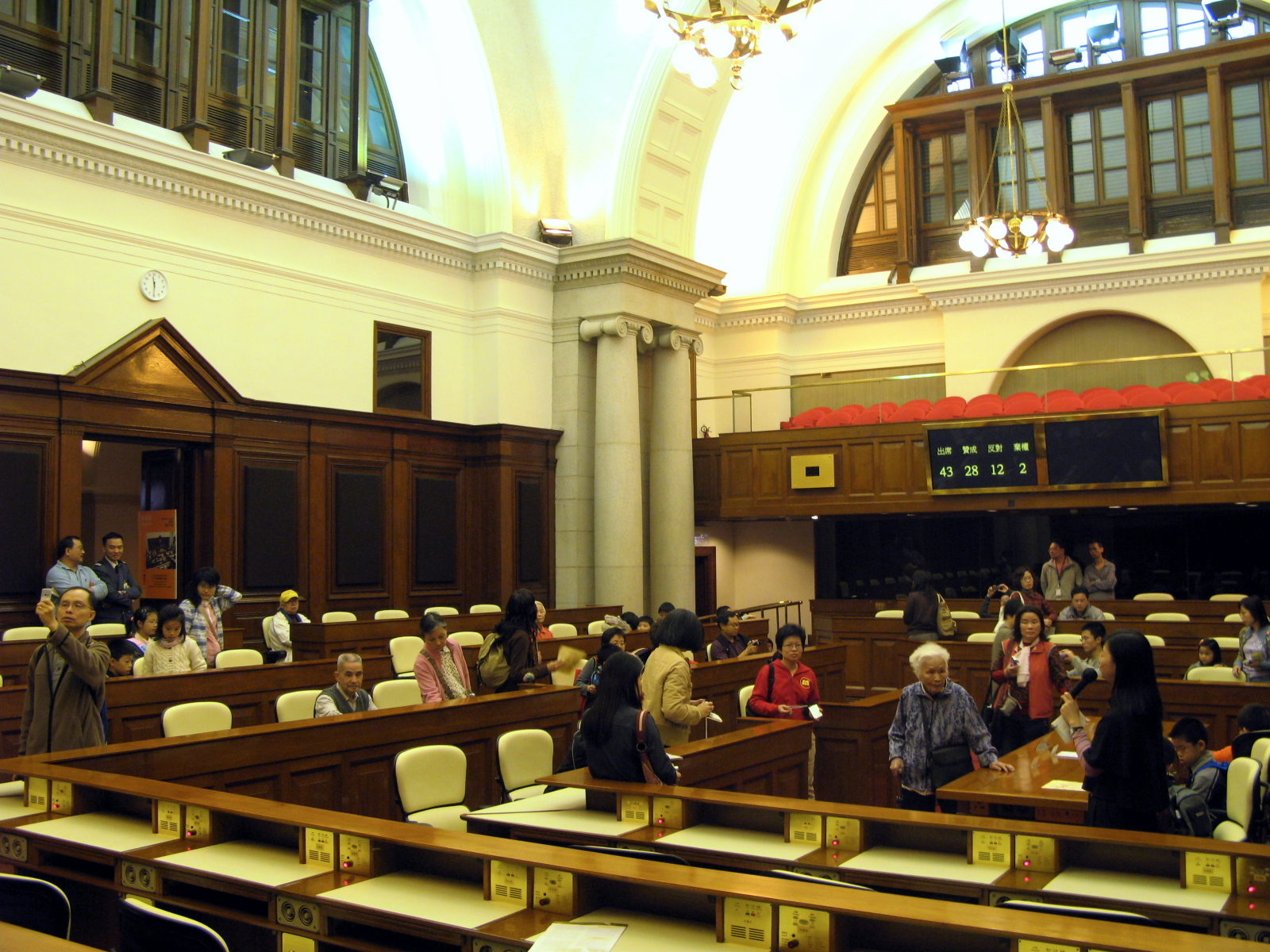
Chamber interior

== See also ==
- Hong Kong Court of Final Appeal
- Supreme Court (Hong Kong)
- Legislative Council Complex
- Central and Western Heritage Trail
- Former Central Magistracy
- List of buildings and structures in Hong Kong

== Notes ==
Preceded by Exchange Building	Home of the Supreme Court of Hong Kong; 1912–1981	Succeeded by Former French Mission Building
Preceded by Central Government Offices – Main Wing	Home of the Legislative Council of Hong Kong; 1985–1997	Succeeded by None – see Provisional Legislative Council
Preceded by Shenzhen Guesthouse Hotel	Home of the Provisional Legislative Council of Hong Kong; 1997–1998	Succeeded by Legislative Council Building as home to Legislative Council of Hong Kong SAR
Preceded by None – refer to Provisional Legislative Council	Home of the Legislative Council of Hong Kong SAR; 1998–2011	Succeeded by Legislative Council Complex
Preceded by Former French Mission Building	Home of the Court of Final Appeal of Hong Kong SAR; 2015 – present	Succeeded by current
