= Queensway Government Offices =

Building in Admiralty, Hong Kong

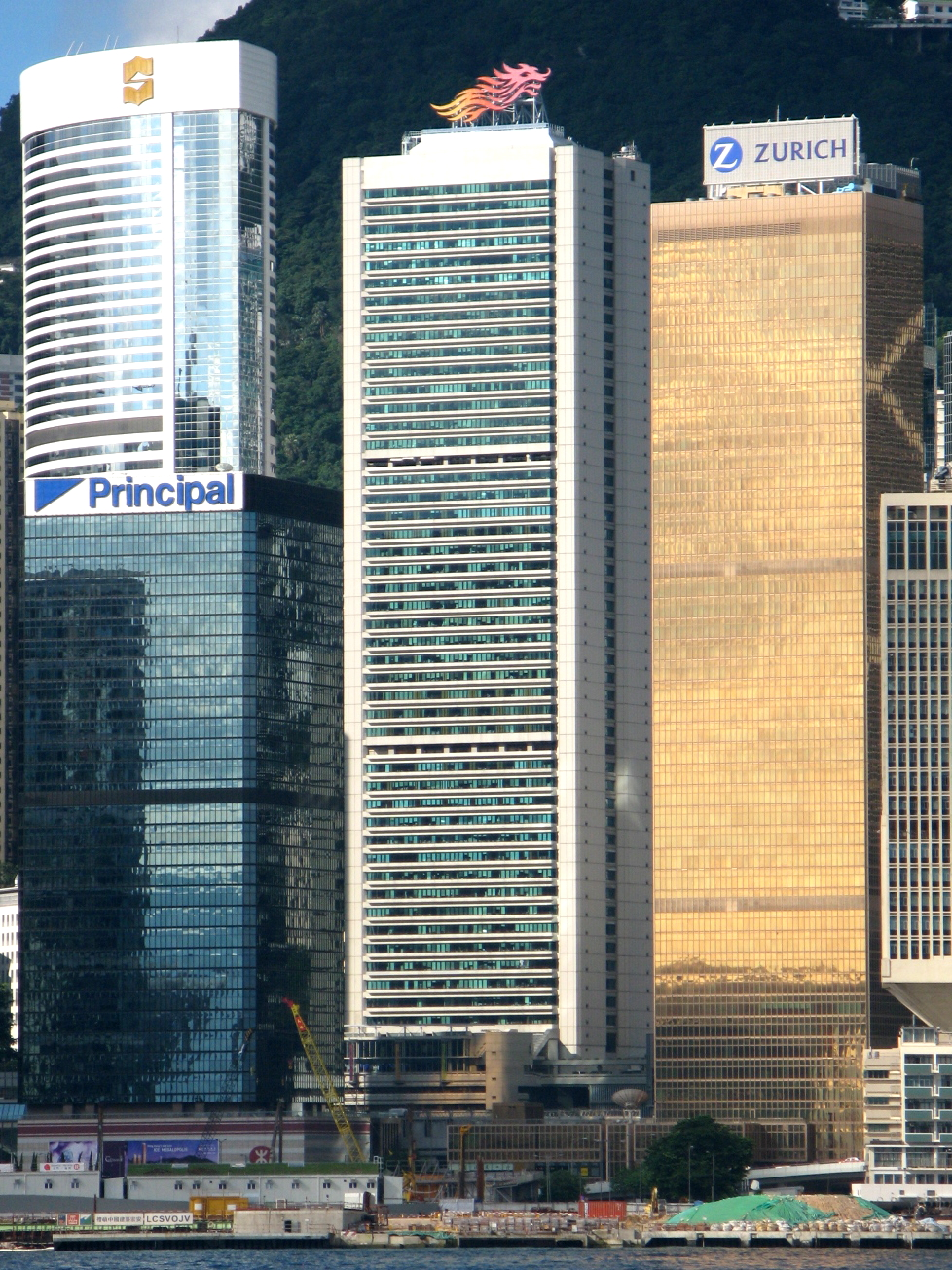
- Interactive map of the Queensway Government Offices area

General information
- Status: Completed
- Type: Office
- Location: 66 Queensway, Admiralty, Hong Kong
- Coordinates: 22°16′40″N 114°09′50″E
- Completed: 1985; 41 years ago
- Opening: 1986; 40 years ago

Height
- Roof: 199 m (653 ft)

Technical details
- Floor count: 56

Design and construction
- Architect: K.M Tseng of the Hong Kong Architectural Services Department
- Main contractor: Gammon

Queensway Government Offices
- Traditional Chinese: 金鐘道政府合署
- Simplified Chinese: 金钟道政府合署
- Jyutping: Gam1 zung1 dou6 zing3 fu2 hap6 cyu5
Transcriptions
Standard Mandarin
- Hanyu Pinyin: Jīnzhōngdào Zhèngfǔhéshǔ
Yue: Cantonese
- Jyutping: Gam1 zung1 dou6 zing3 fu2 hap6 cyu5

The Queensway Government Office Building (in short form QGO) is a skyscraper located in the Admiralty district of Hong Kong near Admiralty station. The tower rises 56 floors and 199 metres (653 ft) in height. The building was completed in 1985. It was designed by Mr K.M. Tseng of the Architectural Services Department. The Queensway Government Offices, which stands as the 54th-tallest building in Hong Kong, is a Hong Kong government office building. The roof of the Queensway Government Office Building is adorned with a dragon logo, the symbol of Hong Kong; the structure was added in 2002.

== History ==
The site of the office building was part of the larger Victoria Barracks site, which was transferred from the British Forces to the Hong Kong Government for redevelopment. The Victoria Barracks Planning Committee proposed building a "large secretariat building" in the vicinity of Flagstaff House, but the government instead decided to build a courthouse and the government office building on Queensway.

Contracts to construct the building were signed on 1 August 1983 by Gammon, the contractor, and the government.

== Agencies ==
- 1/F - 9/F – Department of Justice
- 12/F - 15/F – Companies Registry
- 24/F - 27/F – Legal Aid Department
- 28/F – Land Registry
- 36/F – Architectural Services Department
- 42/F - 45/F – Food and Environmental Hygiene Department

Former agencies:

- Civil Aviation Department (CAD) (46/F) – now located at Hong Kong International Airport

== See also ==
- List of tallest buildings in Hong Kong
