= Fundamental =

Fundamental may refer to:

- Fundamental frequency, often referred to as simply a "fundamental"
- Fundamentalism, the belief in, and usually the strict adherence to the simple or "fundamental" ideas based on faith in a system of thought
- Fundamentals: Ten Keys to Reality, a 2021 popular science book by Frank Wilczek
- The Fundamentals, a set of books important to the Christian fundamentalism
- Any of a number of fundamental theorems identified in mathematics, such as:
  - Fundamental theorem of algebra, a theorem regarding the factorization of polynomials
  - Fundamental theorem of arithmetic, a theorem regarding prime factorization
- Fundamental analysis, the process of reviewing and analyzing a company's financial statements to make better economic decisions

== Music ==
- Fun-Da-Mental,
- Fundamental (Bonnie Raitt album), 1998
- Fundamental (Pet Shop Boys album), 2006
- Fundamental (Puya album) or the title song, 1999
- Fundamental (Mental As Anything album), 1985
- The Fundamentals (album), by Juvenile, 2014
- The Fundamentals, by Theo Croker, 2006
- Fundamentals, an EP by Raheem Jarbo, 2005

== Other uses ==
- "Fundamentals" (Arrow), an episode of the television show Arrow

== See also ==
- Fundamental Articles (disambiguation)
- Fundamental constant (disambiguation)
- Fundamental law (disambiguation)
- Fundamental matrix (disambiguation)
- Fundamental parallelogram (disambiguation)
- Fundamental physical constant (disambiguation)
- Fundamental plane (disambiguation)
