= Book censorship in Hong Kong =

Since the Law of the People's Republic of China on Safeguarding National Security in the Hong Kong Special Administrative Region came into effect on July 1, 2020, media reports have highlighted that Hong Kong Public Libraries and school libraries have removed numerous books and periodicals from their shelves. Concurrently, the Correctional Services Department (CSD) has designated specific books and publications as banned materials. Following complaints and reports from certain organizations alleging that some literature violated the national security law, several distributors and publishers have been convicted and sentenced to imprisonment.

As of July 13, 2026, no fewer than 600 titles are reported to have been banned, censored, or subjected to complaints.

== Policy and Environment Prior to 2020 ==
On October 2, 2007, the Leisure and Cultural Services Department (LCSD) clarified the acquisition policy of public libraries, stating:

"Hong Kong Public Libraries selects and purchases library materials in accordance with the principles of the UNESCO Public Library Manifesto to meet the needs of different people in the society for lifelong learning, academic research, access to information and the best use of spare time. In the spirit of the Manifesto, the Hong Kong Public Libraries adheres to the principle of safeguarding information freedom when purchasing books and newspapers and will not censor publications."

On June 24, 2009, the Home Affairs Department stated in the Legislative Council of the Hong Kong Special Administrative Region:

"As at June 15, 2009, the Hong Kong Public Libraries (HKPL) holds 149 titles of books on the 1989 Tiananmen Square protests and massacre and related topics and the number of copies totals 1,162. In response to the demand of the readers, HKPL has ordered an addition of 250 copies of these books. By then, the percentage of the relevant books available for loan will be 82%."

Despite having 149 such titles in 2009, by May 2023, only three titles related to the event remained in the public library collection.

=== The A Concise History of Hong Kong abridged edition incident (2013) ===
In 2013, it was revealed that historian John M. Carroll’s book A Concise History of Hong Kong existed in both an "original version" and an abridged Chinese edition. While the covers, translators, and publishing details of both versions were largely identical, the abridged version omitted numerous paragraphs concerning the Chinese government and Hong Kong politics. Carroll stated that he had no prior knowledge of the abridged version's existence, expressed shock and disappointment, and demanded that the publisher recall it.

Chung Hwa Book Company (Hong Kong) Limited, the publisher, responded that the abridged edition was merely a "sample copy" produced for copyright negotiations with mainland China, which leaked into the market due to being mistakenly sent to the Hong Kong Book Fair for sale. However, media reports pointed out that the abridged version had also been sold in other bookstores across Hong Kong, conflicting with the publisher's account. The incident sparked widespread public discussion regarding whether the publisher altered content due to political factors and raised concerns about self-censorship within the publishing industry.

== Post-2020 developments ==
=== Public Library collection removals and government response ===
On 4 July 2020, media outlets first reported that several titles in the Hong Kong Public Libraries (HKPL) collections had been removed from shelves following the enactment of the National Security Law. An investigation by Stand News revealed that the Leisure and Cultural Services Department (LCSD) had issued directives to "review" works by certain pro-democracy political figures and columnists, including Joshua Wong (Huang, Zhifeng.), Tanya Chan (Chen, Shuzhuang.), and Chin Wan (Chen, Yun.). The books were suspended from circulation and removed from public shelves while the review was pending.

The LCSD subsequently responded that since the implementation of the law in late June 2020, public libraries had incorporated the safeguarding of national security as a key consideration in acquiring books and accepting donations. The department added that it would review materials upon receiving public complaints, implementing suspensions or removals as necessary. While authorities emphasized that any books suspected of violating local legislations would be immediately taken down for review, they consistently declined to disclose specific figures or a checklist of the removed titles.

Following a report by the Audit Commission urging stronger vetting procedures, the LCSD stated it had completed the removal of books "manifestly contrary to national security." The department revealed that the comprehensive assessment of its collections commenced in 2021. However, due to the growing volume of books requiring inspection and the complexity of the follow-up work, the review remained incomplete as of the first quarter of 2023. Consequently, the LCSD stated it was "impossible to set a definitive completion date" for the entire vetting process.

On May 16, 2023, Chief Executive John Lee Ka-chiu responded to the controversy surrounding the Leisure and Cultural Services Department (LCSD) removing a large number of public library books from its shelves. He emphasized that the LCSD has a responsibility to ensure that borrowed books serve Hong Kong's interests and do not violate Hong Kong law, which includes reviewing whether books disseminate information detrimental to Hong Kong or involve copyright issues. He stated that he has confidence in the professional judgment of the department's staff, and added that if citizens wish to read these books, they can still purchase them through private bookstores.

=== Criticisms and international response ===
Some scholars argue that the government's current library policies violate the UNESCO Public Library Manifesto, which asserts that "collections and services should not be subject to any form of ideological, political or religious censorship, nor commercial pressures." Critics have expressed concern that these measures undermine the fundamental role of public libraries.

On November 11, 2022, the United Nations Human Rights Committee issued its "Concluding observations on the fourth periodic report of Hong Kong, China," evaluating the region's compliance with the International Covenant on Civil and Political Rights. In Article C, Paragraph 44, the Committee recommended that Hong Kong should:

- (a) Immediately stop censoring books and other material in public libraries, including school libraries, and reinstate the books and other material that have been removed for allegedly breaching the National Security Law or for being contrary to the interests of national security;
- (b) Publish a list of the books and materials that have been removed;
- (c) Take concrete steps necessary to ensure non-recurrence.

To date, the Hong Kong government and school management bodies have not implemented these recommendations. Observers argue this lack of compliance conflicts with the Universal Declaration of Human Rights and associated international treaties.

On July 30, 2026, Choi Chi-sum, general secretary of the Society for Truth and Light, commented on bookstores in Hong Kong facing obstruction for selling books that have not been ruled illegal by a court, emphasizing that reading books from diverse perspectives is vital for building critical thinking and strengthening convictions. He pointed out that bookstore staff and owners cannot possibly read every single line of every book, making it completely normal to sell books not yet ruled illegal, and noted that Hong Kong has never had a prior censorship system for newspapers and publications, which is the true embodiment of freedom of speech and publication. He believes that under "One Country, Two Systems," Hong Kong's bottom line lies in freedom of speech and publication, meaning citizens should not live in fear of possessing unconvicted books, and business operations require clear legal bases rather than relying solely on officials' subjective views. Choi reiterated that if law enforcement agencies believe someone has broken the law, they must publicly disclose the reasons for prosecution and must never arrest, seize, or ban sales based on unwarranted charges or undisclosed reasoning, as doing so would constitute an abuse of power and undermine the rule of law, given that the purpose of the law is to provide citizens with predictable rules and restrain government behavior rather than suppress dissidents.

=== School library restrictions and self-censorship ===
In 2024, reports emerged that school administrators and educators responsible for national security education had escalated self-censorship efforts. Books published in Taiwan became a primary focus due to printed terms such as "Taiwan," "Country," or "National Library Cataloging in Publication." Schools adopted various containment measures, including using stickers or black markers to cover up the terms "Taiwan" and "country," or removing Taiwan-published books entirely from library shelves.

These developments parallel earlier actions in 2023, where the Hong Kong Government and the Liaison Office of the Central People's Government of China barred Taiwanese universities from using the term "national" during the Taiwan Education Exhibition in Hong Kong, leading some institutions to withdraw from the event.Such practices have been described as similar to earlier censorship methods used by mainland China to remove politically sensitive terms, such as the "Republic of China calendar era" (Minguo era), from Taiwanese books.

Additionally, reports indicate that some government schools in Hong Kong have discontinued the use of the HyRead e-book platform, provided by Taiwan’s Hyweb Technology. Furthermore, they have canceled certain online reading platforms for Chinese and English subjects to prevent teachers and students from accessing content alleged to violate the National Security Law or the Basic Law.

=== Inaction by library professional associations ===
Beyond the high volume of books and periodicals actively removed from libraries, numerous other publications have never reached shelves due to preemptive censorship or self-censorship. Critics argue this silently deprives readers of information freedom.

During this period, major local library associations, such as the Hong Kong Library Association and the Hong Kong Teacher-Librarians' Association, did not issue public concerns or take collective professional action. This lack of response has been described by some as a collapse of professional standards. Observers note that local librarians, teacher-librarians, school quality-assurance personnel (inspectors) of the Education Bureau, school management, and teachers have struggled to uphold established codes of professionalism and safeguard the free flow of information.

Additionally, literature regarding the 1989 Tiananmen Square protests and massacre has become increasingly scarce across libraries and mainstream retail bookstores in Hong Kong.

=== Government response and blacklist controversy ===
In response to repeated calls from the public and the publishing industry to release an official list of banned books, the Hong Kong government has consistently declined to do so.

Following law enforcement actions involving independent bookstores, including "Book Punch" in April 2026, as well as "Have A Nice Stay" and "Greenfield Bookstore" in July 2026, Secretary for Security Chris Tang Ping-keung reiterated the government's stance during media briefings. Tang maintained that establishing a "blacklist" would "facilitate lawbreakers" by allowing them to circumvent regulations, suggesting that offenders might exploit loopholes simply by changing book titles to evade liability. He emphasized that law enforcement focuses on whether the underlying content harbors seditious intent, such as inciting hatred against the government or the judiciary, rather than the titles themselves, asserting that "the law is very clear; if you break the law, you have crossed the red line."

Tang further argued that booksellers bear an inherent responsibility to vet their inventory to ensure compliance with national security laws, drawing a parallel to the catering industry:

"If you sell food, you make sure that the food you sell won't give people stomach aches, isn't poisonous, and isn't illegal. I believe that booksellers, likewise, have a responsibility [to ensure that their books do not endanger national security]."

Expanding on the analogy, Tang noted that while food merchants might not personally taste every product, they retain methods to verify sources and ingredients. Consequently, he stated it is implausible for bookstore owners to sell literature without any knowledge of its contents, concluding that claiming not to have opened or read a book does not constitute a valid legal defense.

=== Independent publishers and bookstore closures ===
==== Book Fair exclusions ====
Independent publishers participating in the Hong Kong Book Fair have encountered rising levels of censorship. At least three independent publishers, including "Bbluesky" (藍藍的天) and "Boundary Bookstore" (界限書店), were denied exhibition booths at the 2025 Hong Kong Book Fair. The publishers linked this rejection to their refusal to withdraw "sensitive" books from their displays during the previous year's event. Although the publishers maintained their books were legal and appropriate, the organizer, the Hong Kong Trade Development Council (HKTDC), declined their applications without providing specific reasons, leading to public concern over freedom of publication.

On June 29, 2026, two prominent local independent bookstores, "Elmbook" (榆林書店, est. 1997) and "Luckwin Bookstore" (樂文書店, est. 1984), were disqualified from participating in the 2026 Hong Kong Book Fair, marking their first rejection as regular exhibitors. Both bookstores declined to comment in detail. The HKTDC defended its decision by stating it maintains "sole and absolute discretion" over admission without the need to provide explanations.

This occurred despite statement by HKTDC Deputy Executive Director Sophia Chong earlier that month asserting they "would not censor booksellers." Commentators noted that both bookstores had previously been criticized by pro-Beijing media such as Wen Wei Po for selling books deemed to be of "soft resistance" or in alleged violation of the National Security Law, including the former Hong Kong Governor Chris Patten's memoir, The Hong Kong Diaries.

At the 2026 Hong Kong Book Fair, several books and literary magazines from Book Matter (本事出版) were ordered to be removed from the shelves, leaving their booth with no books on display or for sale.

Having operated for 29 years, "Elmbook" announced via social media on July 8 that it will close its physical store after its lease expires in April 2027, following the rejection of its book fair application (commonly known as "DQ").

==== National Security raids and arrests ====
In early-to-mid 2026, the National Security Department carried out several high-profile enforcement operations targeting independent booksellers:

- March 24, 2026: Police raided the independent bookstore "Book Punch" (一拳書館), arresting its founder Pong Yat-ming (龐一鳴) and three staff members. They were accused of selling "seditious publications," which included The Troublemaker, a biography of jailed media tycoon Jimmy Lai. This was the first enforcement action against a retail bookstore under Section 24 of the Safeguarding National Security Ordinance.
- June 24, 2026: Authorities searched "Hunter Bookstore" (獵人書店) in Mong Kok and arrested its operators, including former pro-democracy district councillor Wong Man-huen (黃文萱). The operators were accused of committing "acts with seditious intention" under the Safeguarding National Security Ordinance, along with "money laundering" allegations involving foreign funds. Seized books included copies of The Troublemaker, a biography of jailed media tycoon Jimmy Lai and cartoon compilations by political satirist Zunzi. International human rights organizations criticized the operations as damaging to the Hong Kong's atmosphere of openness and intellectual diversity.
- July 15, 2026: On the opening day of the 36th Hong Kong Book Fair, a joint operation by the National Security Department and the Customs and Excise Department was conducted at "Have A Nice Stay" (留下書舍) in Prince Edward and "Greenfield Book Store" (田園書屋) in Mong Kok. Five people were arrested for alleged seditious acts. "Have A Nice Stay" (founded by former journalists) had announced the previous day that it would shut down on August 30 due to financial strain and the prevailing political climate. Authorities reportedly acted after intercepting an overseas cargo shipment containing Let Only Red Flowers Bloom, published by Taiwan's Acropolis, which was suspected of carrying seditious intent."Greenfield Book Store" (田園書屋), a long-standing independent bookstore that operated in Hong Kong for 50 years, announced via social media in the early hours of July 29 that it will officially close its doors once its current lease expires. This decision follows a search conducted by officers from the National Security Department of the Hong Kong Police Force and the subsequent arrest of related personnel in mid-July.

The July 2026 raids and arrests drew sharp condemnation from international human rights organizations and regional leaders, who viewed the operations as a severe blow to freedom of expression and independent publishing in Hong Kong. The Committee to Protect Journalists (CPJ) condemned the enforcement of national security legislation against venues managed by former members of the press, classifying it as a direct assault on journalism and calling for the immediate release of detained freelance journalist Sum Wan-wah and bookstore staff member Mandy Lau. Amnesty International accused Hong Kong authorities of deliberately weaponizing "sedition" offenses to eliminate spaces for free thought and open debate, emphasizing that the ambiguous, shifting legal boundaries surrounding banned literature have intensified self-censorship within the city.

Concurrently, Taiwan's President Lai Ching-te publicly expressed concern on social media over the shrinking sphere for public discourse, describing bookstores as critical spaces for intellectual intersection and the preservation of social memory. He noted that when "books can become criminal evidence and bookstores are forced to repeatedly second-guess invisible red lines," the public can no longer think and express themselves freely. Comparing the political pressure to Taiwan's past martial law era, Lai paid tribute to Hong Kong cultural workers striving to hold their ground under difficult circumstances, emphasizing that thought and words should not be imprisoned due to political pressure, and stating his hope that Hong Kong's diverse voices and fundamental rights would be respected and protected.

=== Logistics and Supply Chain Censorship ===
In July 2026, the Taiwan branch of the Hong Kong-headquartered logistics company Jaguar Logistics Co., Ltd. (嘉達國際物流) issued an internal notice announcing that, in order to comply with the Hong Kong National Security Law and mitigate operational risks, it was immediately tightening screening regulations for shipping books from Taiwan to Hong Kong.

The notice explicitly stated that transportation services would be refused for four independent Hong Kong bookstores recently investigated by the National Security Department: "Greenfield Book Store" (田園書屋), "Have A Nice Stay" (留下書舍), "Book Punch" (一拳書館), and "Hunter Bookstore" (獵人書店). It also required other publishers and clients to submit detailed book lists prior to shipment, ensuring no "violating" books were included before arranging delivery.

Although the Hong Kong Security Bureau stated that authorities had not established an official "banned book list," logistics company staff indicated that items involving national security cases, sensational titles (such as "Let only red flowers bloom: identity and belonging in Xi Jinping’s China" and "The Troublemaker, a biography of jailed media tycoon Jimmy Lai"), or books previously pulled from the Hong Kong Book Fair were placed on the restricted shipping list. Staff even suggested that if there were doubts regarding whether a book constituted a banned item, it could be submitted to Xiamen International Book Company Limited (廈門圖書 / 廈門外圖集團有限公司) for review, reasoning that "Hong Kong already belongs to Mainland governance and is considered part of the Mainland region." This approach drew criticism from Taiwan's publishing industry for shifting the burden of self-censorship onto the sector.

=== Overseas Hong Kong Publishers and Self-Censorship ===
Beginning in the 2020s, several Hong Kong publishers relocated overseas and established new publishing houses with the aim of upholding freedom of publication and preserving Hong Kong history. Among them is "Gotta Press （應該出版）," established in Taiwan with Deng Xiaohua (Tang Siu-wa) as editor-in-chief, alongside veteran publisher Chen Hui-hui, writers Chen Hui (Chan Wai) and Juanita Cheng (aka Missy Hyper), and lyricist Calvin Poon Yuen-leung serving as president.

In 2025, during the publication of philosopher Cheung Chan-fai's (Zhang Canhui) book Xi yang xi xia ji shi hui: ji nian lao ming hui de er shi feng xin (夕陽西下幾時回：給年老明慧的二十封信), the publisher refused to include a foreword written by Chung Kim-wah on the grounds that his "status was sensitive," sparking public skepticism over whether overseas publishers are similarly prone to self-censorship. Subsequently, publications by Gotta Press were reportedly restricted at the Hong Kong Book Fair, prompting the publisher's leadership to publicly state their opposition to book bans and their support for freedom of publication.

Following the incident, Chung Kim-wah publicly criticized the publisher for advocating freedom of the press and publication on one hand while restricting content out of fear of political risks on the other, questioning whether such actions constituted self-censorship. However, Gotta Press did not publicly state that its decision involved political considerations, leaving the underlying reasons and nature of the publisher's decision open to differing interpretations in public opinion.

== List of banned books ==
Disclosure date	Title	Author	Banned by Public Libraries	Banned by school libraries	Banned in ebook or e-databases	Banned by CSD	Complained	Ref.
2020-07-04	香港城邦論 : 一國兩制, 城邦自治, 是香港生死攸關之事 / Xianggang cheng bang lun : yi guo liang zhi, cheng bang zi zhi, shi Xianggang sheng si you guan zhi sh	陳雲 / Chen, Yun.	check					
2020-07-04	香港城邦論. II, 光復本土 / Xianggang cheng bang lun. II, Guang fu ben tu	陳雲 / Chen, Yun.	check					
2020-07-04	城邦主權論 / Cheng bang zhu quan lun	陳雲 / Chen, Yun.	check					
2020-07-04	香港保衛戰 / Xianggang bao wei zhan	陳雲 / Chen, Yun.	check					
2020-07-04	香港遺民論 / Xianggang yi min lun	陳雲 / Chen, Yun.	check					
2020-07-04	身土不二 / Shen tu bu er	陳雲 / Chen, Yun.	check					
2020-07-04	我不是英雄 : 黃之鋒政論集 / Wo bu shi ying xiong : Huang Zhifeng zheng lun ji	黃之鋒 / Huang, Zhifeng.	check					
2020-07-04	我不是細路 : 十八前後 / Wo bu shi xi lu : shi ba qian hou	黃之鋒 / Huang, Zhifeng.	check					
2020-07-04	邊走邊吃邊抗爭 / Bian zou bian chi bian kang zheng	陳淑莊 / Chen, Shuzhuang.	check		check	check		
2021-02-19	羊村守衛者 / Yang cun shou wei zhe	香港言語治療師總工會 / Xianggang yan yu zhi liao shi zong gong hui					check	
2021-02-19	羊村十二勇士 / Yang cun shi er yong shi	香港言語治療師總工會 / Xianggang yan yu zhi liao shi zong gong hui					check	
2021-02-19	羊村清道夫 / Yang cun qing dao fu	香港言語治療師總工會 / Xianggang yan yu zhi liao shi zong gong hui					check	
2021-05-08	香港民族論 / Xianggang min zu lun	二零一三年度香港大學學生會學苑 (Editor) / Er ling yi san nian du Xianggang da xue xue sheng hui xue yuan bian	check					
2021-05-08	我向霸權宣戰 / Wo xiang ba quan xuan zhan	何俊仁 / He, Junren.	check					
2021-05-08	陳淑莊敏感地帶 / Chen Shuzhuang min gan di dai	陳淑莊 / Chen, Shuzhuang.	check					
2021-05-08	卑賤的中國人 / Bei jian de Zhongguo ren	余杰 / Yu, Jie.	check					
2021-05-08	納粹中國 / Na cui Zhongguo	余杰 / Yu, Jie.	check					
2021-05-08	香港公民抗爭運動史 : 挫敗的三十年剖析 / Xiang gang gong min kang zheng yun dong shi : cuo bai de san shi nian pou xi	林匡正 / Lin, Kuangzheng.	check					
2021-05-08	中港對决 : 香港抗争運動史. 2 / Zhong Gang dui jue : Xianggang kang zheng yun dong shi. 2	林匡正 / Lin, Kuangzheng.	check					
2021-05-08	激進 : 香港進步民主運動史 / Ji jin : Xianggang jin bu min zhu yun dong shi	林匡正 / Lin, Kuangzheng.	check					
2021-05-08	這個帝國必須分裂 / Zhe ge di guo bi xu fen lie	廖亦武 / Liao, Yiwu.	check					
2021-05-29	公民抗命 / Gong min kang ming	丁若芝 / Ding, Ruozhi.	check					
2021-05-29	公民抗命 / Gong min kang ming	Kirk, Andrew.	check					
2021-05-29	公民抗命與佔領中環 : 香港基督徒的信仰省思 / Gong min kang ming yu zhan ling zhong huan : xiang gang ji du tu di xin yang xing si	戴耀廷、朱耀明、龔立人等 / Dai, Yaoting., Zhu, Yaoming., Gong, Li., et al.	check					
2021-05-29	72511見證公民抗命 / 72511 jian zheng gong min kang ming	2014年7月2日公民抗命被捕者及支援者 / 2014 nian 7 yue 2 ri gong min kang ming bei bu zhe ji zhi yuan zhe	check					
2021-05-29	公民抗命三巨人 : 甘地, 馬丁路德 ・ 金, 曼德拉 = 3 giants of civil disobedience / Gong min kang ming san ju ren : Gandi, Madinglude Jin, Mandela = 3 giants of civil disobedience	彭順強 = Pang, Daniel S. K. / Peng, Shunqiang.	check					
2021-05-29	來生不做中國人 = I don't want to be Chinese again / Lai sheng bu zuo Zhongguo ren	鍾祖康 = Chung, Joe / Zhong, Zukang.	check	check				
2021-05-29	給穿過黑衣的人 / Gei chuan guo hei yi de ren	學民思潮 / Xue min si chao	check					
2021-05-29	予豈好辯哉 : 毓民議壇搞事錄續篇 / Yu qi hao bian zai : Yumin yi tan gao shi lu xu pian	黃毓民 / Huang, Yumin.	check					
2021-05-29	愛港, 是咁的! / Ai Gang, shi gan de!	陳聰 / Chen, Cong.	check					
2021-05-29	釋放香港 : 讓我們活得更好! / Shi fang Xianggang : rang wo men huo de geng hao!	黎廣德 / Li, Guangde.	check					
2021-05-29	Breakazine! 059，催淚香港 / Breakazine! 059, cui lei Xianggang	Breakzine! 創作小組等 / Breakazine! chuang zuo xiao zu et al.	check	check	check	check		
2021-05-29	Breakazine! 060，勇氣不滅 － 在極權時代直面恐懼 / Breakazine! 060, yong qi bu mie zai ji quan shi dai zhi mian kong ju	Breakzine! 創作小組等 / Breakazine! chuang zuo xiao zu et al.	check	check	check			
2021-05-29	愛香港不愛黨白皮書 / Ai Gang bu ai dang bai pi shu	彭志銘 / Peng, Zhiming.	check					
2021-05-29	生於亂世, 有種責任 = Our responsibility / Sheng yu luan shi, you zhong ze ren	周淑屏 / Zhou, Shuping.	check					
2021-05-29	棕國好狗 = Brown Morning / Zong guo hao gou	Pavloff, Franck.	check					
2021-05-29	社運心理學 = The psychology of social movement / She yun xin li xue	Lo's Psychology	check					
2021-06-24	你夠拼命嗎：黎智英的創業心法 / Ni gou pin ming ma : Li Zhiying de chuang ye xin fa	黎智英 / Li, Zhiying.	check					
2021-06-24	我是黎智英：白手起家的創業告白 / Wo shi Li Zhiying : bai shou qi jia de chuang ye gao ba	黎智英 / Li, Zhiying.	check					
2021-06-24	我是黎智英 : 從一元港幣到五億美金的創業傳奇 / Wo shi Li Zhiying : cong yi yuan Gang bi dao wu yi Mei jin de chuang ye chuan qi	黎智英 / Li, Zhiying.	check					
2021-06-24	生意 : 黎智英如何打造大眾商品 / Sheng yi : li zhi ying ru he da zao da zhong shang pin	黎智英 / Li, Zhiying.	check					
2021-06-24	人生不是名利場 / Ren sheng bu shi ming li chang	黎智英 / Li, Zhiying.	check					
2021-06-24	樂觀是我最大的本錢 / Le guan shi wo zui da de ben qian	黎智英 / Li, Zhiying.	check					
2021-06-24	我做生意的心得 / Wo zuo sheng yi de xin de	黎智英 / Li, Zhiying.	check					
2021-06-24	肥佬黎學習做個快樂人 / Fei lao Li xue xi zuo ge kuai le ren	黎智英 / Li, Zhiying.	check					
2021-06-24	肥佬黎創新求存 / Feilaoli chuang xin qiu cun	黎智英 / Li, Zhiying.	check					
2021-06-24	肥佬黎食遍天下 / Fei lao Li shi bian tian xia	黎智英 / Li, Zhiying.	check					
2021-06-24	我退休失敗了 / Wo tui xiu shi bai le	黎智英 / Li, Zhiying.	check					
2021-06-24	我已無求 : 黎智英超越狂人的人生智慧 / Wo yi wu qiu : Li Zhiying chao yue kuang ren de ren sheng zhi hui	黎智英 / Li, Zhiying.	check					
2021-06-24	夠了!退休! / Gou le! Tui xiu!	黎智英 / Li, Zhiying.	check					
2021-06-24	我的理想是隻糯米雞 : 事實與偏見III / Wo de li xiang shi zhi nuo mi ji : Shi shi yu pian jian III	黎智英 / Li, Zhiying.	check					
2021-06-24	期待 / Qi dai	黎智英 / Li, Zhiying.	check					
2021-06-24	靈感的拓荒者 / Ling gan de tuo huang zhe	黎智英 / Li, Zhiying.	check					
2021-06-24	肥佬黎打眞軍 / Fei lao Li da zhen jun	黎智英 / Li, Zhiying.	check					
2021-06-24	門窄路狹出生天 / Men zhai lu xia chu sheng tian	黎智英 / Li, Zhiying.	check					
2021-06-24	時代, 請等等。 / Shi dai, qing deng deng.	黎智英 / Li, Zhiying.	check					
2021-06-24	自己的聲音 / Zi ji de sheng yin	黎智英 / Li, Zhiying.	check					
2021-06-24	狂人遇上新經濟 / Kuang ren yu shang xin jing ji	黎智英 / Li, Zhiying.	check					
2021-06-24	我是個吃過苦頭的父親 : 肥佬黎 / Wo shi ge chi guo ku tou de fu qin : Fei lao Li	黎智英 / Li, Zhiying.	check					
2021-06-24	經驗出智慧 : 黎智英扭轉乾坤的試誤哲學 / Jing yan chu zhi hui : Li Zhiying niu zhuan qian kun de shi wu zhe xue	黎智英 / Li, Zhiying.	check					
2021-07-24	一讀就懂 : 孩子必須知的法律常識 / Yi du jiu dong : hai zi bi xu zhi de fa lu chang shi	梅碧思, 翁達揚 / Mei, Bisi., Weng, Dayang.	check				check	
2021-07-28	向中国低文明說不 = Say no to uncivilized China / Xiang Zhongguo di wen ming shuo bu	鍾祖康 / Zhong, Zukang.	check					
2021-07-28	雨傘運動的思考之旅 / Yu san yun dong de si kao zhi lü	鄧偉棕 / Deng, Weizong.	check					
2021-07-28	畸形國情 : 強國不強民 / Ji xing guo qing : qiang guo bu qiang min	潘小濤 / Pan, Xiaotao.	check					
2021-07-28	街道上・帳篷人 / Jie dao shang, zhang peng ren	佔領區的抗爭者 / Zhan ling qu de kang zheng zhe	check					
2021-07-28	佔中, 我識條鐵 / Zhan Zhong, wo shi tiao tie	邵家臻 / Shao, Jiazhen.	check					
2021-07-28	雨傘政治四重奏 / Yu san zheng zhi si zhong zou	陳景輝, 何式凝, 小小, Anthony / Chen, Jinghui., Ho, Petula Sik Ying., Xiaoxiao., Anthony.	check					
2021-07-28	法治的未來 / Fa zhi de wei lai	戴耀廷 / Dai, Yaoting.	check					
2021-07-28	民主的未來 / Min zhu de wei lai	戴耀廷 / Dai, Yaoting.	check					
2021-07-28	「兩制」與「一國」的未來 / "Liang zhi" yu "yi guo" de wei lai	戴耀廷 / Dai, Yaoting.	check					
2021-07-28	繼續運動 : 八十後自我研究青年2012 / Ji xu yun dong : ba shi hou zi wo yan jiu qing nian 2012	吳國偉等 / Wu, Guowei et al.	check					
2021-07-28	走出政府總部 : 做個快樂的抗爭者 / Zou chu zheng fu zong bu : zuo ge kuai le de kang zheng zhe	陳雲 / Chen, Yun.	check					
2021-07-28	終極評論, 快樂抗爭 / Zhong ji ping lun, kuai le kang zheng	陳雲 / Chen, Yun.	check					
2021-10-13	香港, 鬱躁的家邦 : 本土觀點的香港源流史 / Xianggang, yu zao de jia bang : ben tu guan dian de Xianggang yuan liu shi	徐承恩 = Tsui, Sing Yan Eric. / Xu, Cheng'en.	check					
2021-10-13	城邦舊事 : 十二本書看香港本土史 / Cheng bang jiu shi : shi er ben shu kan Xianggang ben tu shi	徐承恩 = Tsui, Sing Yan Eric. / Xu, Cheng'en.	check		check			
2021-10-13	佔領中環 : 和平抗爭心戰室 / Zhan ling Zhonghuan : he ping kang zheng xin zhan shi	戴耀廷 / Dai, Yaoting.	check		check			
2021-10-13	對話 x 佔領 = Occupy / Dui hua x zhan ling	戴耀廷, 譚蕙芸 / Dai, Yaoting., Tan, Huiyun.	check		check			
2021-10-17	八國聯軍乃正義之師 = Eight-nation alliance / Ba guo lian jun nai zheng yi zhi shi	劉淇昆 / Liu, Qikun.					check	
2021-11-21	六四日記 : 廣場上的共和國 / Liu si ri ji : guang chang shang de gong he guo	封從德 / Feng, Congde.	check					
2021-11-21	六四屠殺內幕解密 : 六四事件中的戒嚴部隊 / Liu si tu sha nei mu jie mi : Liu si shi jian zhong de jie yan bu dui	吳仁華 / Wu, Renhua.	check					
2021-11-21	從六四到伊拉克戰場 : 熊焱牧軍日記 / Cong liu si dao Yilake zhan chang : Xiong Yan mu jun ri ji	熊焱 / Xiong, Yan.	check					
2021-11-21	六四天安門血腥清場內幕 / Liu si Tiananmen xue xing qing chang nei mu	吳仁華 / Wu, Renhua.	check					
2021-11-21	天安門之子 : 最新政治評論集 / Tiananmen zhi zi : zui xin zheng zhi ping lun ji	余杰 / Yu, Jie.	check					
2021-11-21	中國「六四」眞相 = June Fourth : the true story / Zhongguo "Liu si" zhen xiang	張良 / Zhang, Liang.	check					
2021-11-21	天安門不真相 / Tian'anmen bu zhen xiang	陳敏生 / Chen, Minsheng.	check					
2021-11-21	天安門事件後中共與美國外交內幕 : 一位中國大陸外交官的歷史見證 = The inside stories of the diplomacy between communist China and America / Tian'anmen shi jian hou Zhong gong yu Meiguo wai jiao nei mu : yi wei Zhongguo da lu wai jiao guan de li shi jian zheng	陳有為 / Chen, Youwei.	check					
2021-11-21	見証屠殺尋求正義 : 六四傷殘者和死難者家屬証詞 / Jian zheng tu sha xun qiu zheng yi : liu si shang can zhe he si nan zhe jia shu zheng ci	中國人權 (組織) = Human Rights in China (Organization) / Zhongguo ren quan	check					
2021-11-21	六四的內情 : 未完成的涅槃 / Liu si de nei qing : wei wan cheng de nie pan	包遵信 / Bao, Zunxin.	check					
2021-11-21	王丹獄中回憶錄 / Wang Dan yu zhong hui yi lu	王丹 / Wang, Dan.	check					
2021-11-21	脚印與戰叫 : 支聯會「六四」七周年紀念圖片集 / Jiao yin yu zhan jiao : Zhi lian hui "liu si" qi zhou nian ji nian tu pian ji	麥海華等 / Mai, Haihua. et al.	check					
2021-11-21	末日倖存者的獨白 : 關於我和「六・四」 / Mo ri xing cun zhe de du bai : guan yu wo he "liu, si"	劉曉波 / Liu, Xiaobo.	check					
2021-11-21	天安門廣場淸場紀實 / Tian'an men guang chang qing chang ji shi	吳仁華 / Wu, Renhua.	check					
2021-11-21	漆黑將不再面對 : 八九中國民運專輯 : 香港支援民運圖片集 / Qi hei jiang bu zai mian dui : ba jiu Zhongguo min yun zhuan ji : Xianggang zhi yuan min yun tu pian ji	香港市民支援愛國民主運動聯合會 / Xianggang shi min zhi yuan ai guo min zhu yun dong lian he hui	check					
2021-11-21	八九中國民運見証報告專輯 = Witness reports on the democratic movement of China ʼ89 / Ba jiu Zhongguo min yun jian zheng bao gao zhuan ji = Witness reports on the Democratic Movement of China ʼ89	中國民主運動資料中心 / Zhongguo min zhu yun dong zi liao zhong xin	check					
2021-11-21	八九中國民運報章廣告專輯 / Ba jiu Zhongguo min yun bao zhang guang gao zhuan ji	香港市民支援愛國民主運動聯合會中國民主運動資料中心 / Xianggang shi min zhi yuan ai guo min zhu yun dong lian he hui Zhongguo min zhu yun dong zi liao zhong xin	check					
2021-11-21	八九中國民運鎭壓迫害專輯 : 期刊資料 / Ba jiu Zhongguo min yun zhen ya po hai zhuan ji : qi kan zi liao	香港市民支援愛國民主運動聯合會中國民主運動資料中心 / Xianggang shi min zhi yuan ai guo min zhu yun dong lian he hui Zhongguo min zhu yun dong zi liao zhong xin	check					
2021-11-21	天安門血案經緯 / Tian an men xue an jing wei	胡志偉 / Hu, Zhiwei.	check					
2021-11-21	柴玲 : 中國的和平鬥士 / Chai Lin : Zhongguo de he ping dou shi	陳靖偉 / Chen, Jingwei.	check					
2021-11-21	「6.4大屠殺」評析 / "6.4 da tu sha" ping xi	梁文貴 / Liang, Wengui.	check					
2021-11-21	八九中國民運報章頭版專輯 / Ba jiu Zhongguo min yun bao zhang tou ban zhuan ji	香港市民支援愛國民主運動聯合會中國民主運動資料中心 \ Xianggang shi min zhi yuan ai guo min zhu yun dong lian he hui Zhongguo min zhu yun dong zi liao zhong xin	check					
2021-11-21	對中國民運的認識與反省資料選輯 / Dui Zhongguo min yun de ren shi yu fan xing zi liao xuan ji	《對中國民運的認識與反省資料選輯》編輯小組 / "Dui Zhongguo min yun de ren shi yu fan xin zi liao xuan ji" bian ji xiao zu	check					
2021-11-21	歷史的創傷 : 1989中國民運史料彙編 / Li shi de chuang shang : 1989 Zhongguo min yun shi liao hui bian	寒山碧 (編輯) / Han, Shanbi. (Editor)	check					
2021-11-21	柴玲自白書 : 民運鬥士的自白書 / Chai Ling zi bai shu : Min yun dou shi di zi bai shu	柴玲 / Chai, Ling.	check					
2021-11-21	The factual account of a search for the June 4 victims	Ding, Zilin.	check					
2021-11-21	The eyes have it : 48 eyewitness accounts on the 1989 June 4 Incident in Beijing = 六四見證 : 四十八名目擊證人的報告	六四見證編輯委員會 / "Liu si jian zheng" bian ji wei yuan hui	check					
2021-11-21	June Four : a chronicle of the Chinese democratic uprising	Jiang, Jin . Zhou, Qin.	check					
2021-11-22	二十道陰影下的自由 : 香港新聞審查日常 / Er shi dao yin ying xia de zi you : Xianggang xin wen shen cha ri chang	區家麟 / Ou, Jialin.	check					
2021-11-27	大時代的哲學 / Da shi dai de zhe xue	好青年荼毒室 / Hao qing nian tu du shi	check		check	check		
2022-10-26	光隱於塵 : 周漢輝詩集 / Guang yin yu chen: Zhou Hanhui shi ji	周漢輝 / Zhou, Hanhui.	disqualified from the award (The 16th Hong Kong Biennial Awards for Chinese Literature in 2023)					
2022-10-26	戒和同修 : 曾詠聰詩集 / Jie he tong xiu : Ceng Yongcong shi ji	曾詠聰 / Ceng, Yongcong.	disqualified from the award (The 16th Hong Kong Biennial Awards for Chinese Literature in 2023)					
2022-10-26	漫長的霧, 黝黑的光 : 陳李才詩集 / Man chang de wu, you hei de guang : Chen Licai shi ji	陳李才 / Chen, Licai.	disqualified from the award (The 16th Hong Kong Biennial Awards for Chinese Literature in 2023)					
	政・戲・人 / Zheng, xi, ren	陳淑莊 / Chen, Shuzhuang.	check					
	常識革命 : 否想「雨傘運動」的三宗罪 / Chang shi ge ming : fou xiang "Yu san yun dong" de san zong zui	許寶強 / Xu, Baoqiang.	check					
2021-12-01	恐懼與希望 : 寫在亂世的心理學 / Kong ju yu xi wang : xie zai luan shi de xin li xue	樹洞香港 / Shu dong Xianggang				check		
2021-12-01	千日無悔 : 我的心路歷程 / Qian ri wu hui : wo de xin lu li cheng	程翔 = Ching, Cheong. / Cheng, Xiang.				check		
2021-12-01	坐監記 / Zuo jian ji	邵家臻 / Shao, Jiazhen.				check		
2021-12-01	榮光歲月 : 2019逆權運動回顧 / Rong guang sui yue : 2019 ni quan yun dong hui gu	蘋果日報有限公司 / Ping guo ri bao you xian gong si				check		
2021-12-01	自由六月：2019年香港「反送中」與自由運動的開端	22 Hongkongers				check		
2021-12-01	奴教 = Yes sir / Nu jiao	為別人 / Weibieren.				check		
2021-12-01	囚徒健身 : 60項徒手健身技法, 激發身體潛在能量 = Convict conditioning / Qiu tu jian shen : 60 xiang tu shou jian shen ji fa, ji fa shen ti qian zai neng liang = Convict conditioning	Wade, Paul.				check		
2021-12-01	元朗黑夜 : 我的記憶和眾人的記憶 / Yuanlang hei ye : Wo de ji yi he zhong ren de ji yi	柳俊江 / Liu, Junjiang.		check		check	check	
2021-12-01	天空下 : 中大人反送中運動訪談集 = Beneath the skies / Tian kong xia : Zhong da ren fan song Zhong yun dong fang tan ji	山城記事 / Shan cheng ji shi				check		
2021-12-01	香港人2.0 : 事件尚未結束, 進化已經完成 / Xianggang ren 2.0 : shi jian shang wei jie shu, jin hua yi jing wan cheng	邢福増, 羅秉祥, 余震宇等 / Xing, Fuzeng., Luo, Bingxiang., Yu, Zhenyu. et al.				check		
2021-10-05	獄文字 = Unfree speech / Yu wen zi	黃之鋒 = Wong, Joshua. / Huang, Zhifeng.				check		
2021-10-05	審判愛與和平 : 雨傘運動陳詞 / Shen pan ai yu he ping : yu san yun dong chen ci	陳健民 (主編) / Chen, Jianmin. (Editor)				check		
2021-10-05	受苦與反抗 : 陳健民・獄中書簡 / Shou ku yu fan kang : Chen Jianmin, Yu zhong shu jian	陳健民 / Chen, Jianmin.				check		
2021-10-05	德蘭修女來作我的光 : 加爾各答聖人的私人書札 = Mother Teresa : come be my light : the private writings of the Saint of Calcutta	Teresa., Kolodiejchuk, Brian.				check		
2021-10-05	聖女大德蘭的靈心城堡 / Sheng nu da de lan de ling xin cheng bao	Teresa of Avila				check		
2021-10-05	犹太人3000年 / Youtai ren 3000 nian	张倩红, 张少华 / Zhang, Qianhong., Zhang, Shaohua.				check		
2021-10-05	大江東去 : 司徒華回憶錄 / Da jiang dong qu : Situ Hua hui yi lu	司徒華 / Situ, Hua.	check	check		check		
2021-10-05	天安门一九八九 / Tian an men 1989	聯合報編輯部 / Lian he bao bian ji bu				check		
2021-10-05	守護者司徒華, 1931-2011 / Shou hu zhe Situ Hua, 1931-2011	明報編輯部 / Ming bao bian ji bu	check			check		
2023-01	定见之外 : 生活日常的哲学短篇 / Ding jian zhi wai : sheng huo ri chang de zhe xue duan pian	郭柏年 / Guo, Bainian.				check		
2021-07-16	每一把傘 / Mei yi ba san	李鴻彦 / Li, Hongyan.					check	
2021-07-16	逆權教師 = A journey through the brick wall / Ni quan jiao shi	良臻 / Liangzhen.					check	
2021-07-16	香港/十年 : 抗爭記錄明信片, 2005-2015 / Xianggang/shi nian : kang zheng ji lu ming xin pian, 2005-2015	朱迅 / Chu, Birdy.					check	
2021-07-16	記者上返行人路 : 14個網媒的採訪反修例運動手記 / Ji zhe shang fan xing ren lu : 14 ge wang mei de cai fang fan xiu li yun dong shou ji	鄧雅凝 (責任編輯) / Deng, Yaning. (Editor)					check	
2021-07-16	我們的價值 : 香港雨傘運動相片記錄 = WITNESS : Documentary Photography of Hong Kong's Umbrella Movement / Wo men de jia zhi : Xianggang yu san yun dong xiang pian ji lu	馬丁 = Martin / Ma Ding.					check	
2021-07-16	石墻生花 : 坐監記及其他 = Voices from within / Shi qiang sheng hua : zuo jian ji ji qi ta	邵家臻 / Shao, Jiazhen.		check			check	
2021-07-16	假如讓我畫下去 / Jia ru rang wo hua xia qu	vawongsir					check	
2021-07-16	有病童話 : 善忘的人有福了 / You bing tong hua : shan wang de ren you fu le	蔡妙雪 / Cai, Miaoxue.					check	
2021-07-16	如水赴壑 : 香港歷史與意識之流 / Ru shui fu he : Xianggang li shi yu yi shi zhi liu	盧斯達 / Lu, Sida.					check	
2021-07-16	捍衛自由 : 和平示威簡史 = Raising freedom's banner : how peaceful demonstrations have changed the world / Han wei zi you : he ping shi wei jian shi	夏博義 / Harris, Paul.					check	
2022-06-27	外參 / Wai shen	外參雜誌社 (出版社) / Wai shen za zhi she (Publisher)			check			
2022-06-27	Beijing Review	China International Publishing Group (Publisher)			check			
2022-06-27	台灣醒報 = Awakening News Networks / Tai wan xing bao	台灣醒報股份有限公司 (出版社) / Tai wan xing bao gu fen you xian gong si (Publisher)			check			
2022-06-27	内幕 = Inside scoop / Nei mu	內幕雜誌社 (出版社) / "Nei mu" za zhi she (Publisher)			check			
2022-06-27	明鏡月刊 / Ming jing yue kan	明鏡月刊雜誌社 (出版社) / Ming jing yue kan za zhi she (Publisher)			check			
2022-06-27	中國密報 = China secret files / Zhongguo mi bao	"中國密報"雜誌社 (出版社) / "Zhongguo mi bao" za zhi she (Publisher)			check			
2022-06-27	天下雜誌 = CommonWealth / Tian xia za zhi	天下雜誌社 (出版社) / Tian xia za zhi she (Publisher)			check			
2022-06-27	兩岸商情 / Liang an shang qing	卓越全球傳媒股份有限公司 (出版社) / Zhuo yue quan qiu chuan mei gu fen you xian gong si (Publisher)			check			
2022-06-27	蘋果日報 = Apple daily / Ping guo ri bao	蘋果日報 (出版社) = Apple daily / Ping guo ri bao (Publisher)			check			
2022-06-27	王丹回憶錄 : 從六四到流亡 / Wang Dan hui yi lu : cong liu si dao liu wang	王丹 / Wang, Dan.			check			
2022-06-27	關於中國的70個問題 / Guan yu Zhongguo de 70 ge wen ti	王丹 / Wang, Dan.			check			
2022-06-27	末日倖存者的獨白 : 劉曉波的「六四」回憶錄 / Mo ri xing cun zhe de du bai : Liu Xiaobo de "liu si" hui yi lu	劉曉波 / Liu, Xiaobo.			check			
2022-06-27	六四前後 / 上, 對八九民運前後的政治分析 / Liu si qian hou / shang, Dui ba jiu min yun qian hou de zheng zhi fen xi	丁望 / Ding, Wang.			check			
2022-06-27	六四前後 / 下, 附錄:文件與參考資料(1985–1995) / Liu si qian hou / xia, Fu lu:wen jian yu can kao zi liao(1985–1995)	丁望 / Ding, Wang.			check			
2022-06-27	抗惡法, 護孩子 : 廣場絶食日記 / Kang e fa, hu hai zi : guang chang jue shi ri ji	韓連山 / Han, Lianshan.			check			
2022-06-27	法治心超越法律條文與制度的價值 : Liberal 系列 / Fa zhi xin: chao yue fa lü tiao wen yu zhi du de jia zhi : Liberal xi lie	戴耀廷 / Dai, Yaoting.			check			
2022-06-27	生於亂世, 有種責任 = Our responsibility / Sheng yu luan shi, you zhong ze ren	周淑屏 / Zhou, Shuping.			check			
2022-06-27	抗命時代的日常 / Kang ming shi dai de ri chang	何式凝 = Ho, Sik Ying Petula. / He, Shining.			check			
2022-06-27	謙卑的奮鬥 / Qian bei de fen dou	何俊仁 / He, Junren.			check			
2022-06-27	城邦舊事 : 十二本書看香港本土史 / Cheng bang jiu shi : shi er ben shu kan Xianggang ben tu shi	徐承恩 = Tsui, Sing Yan Eric. / Xu, Cheng'en.			check			
2022-06-27	傘聚 / San ju	區家麟 / Ou, Jialin.		check	check			
2022-06-27	踢爆國情 / Ti bao guo qing	呂秉權 / Lü, Bingquan.			check			
2022-06-27	踢爆國情. II, 天下危城 / Ti bao guo qing. II, tian xiawei cheng	呂秉權 / Lü, Bingquan.			check			
2022-06-27	重構台灣 : 當代民族主義的文化政治 = Reconstructing Taiwan:the cultural politics of contemporary nationalism / Chong gou tai wan : dang dai min zu zhu yi de wen hua zheng zhi	蕭阿勤 / Hsiau, A-chin.			check			
2022-06-27	Xianggang jian shi : cong zhi min di zhi te bie xing zheng qu	高馬可 / Carroll, John M.			check			
2022-06-27	向中国低文明說不 = Say no to uncivilized China / Xiang Zhongguo di wen ming shuo bu	鍾祖康 / Zhong, Zukang.			check			
2022-06-27	Breakazine! 048, 香港命水 / Breakazine! 048, Xianggang ming shui	Breakazine! 創作小組 / Breakazine! chuang zuo xiao zu			check			
2022-06-27	Breakazine! 045, 不如我哋重頭嚟過？給下一輪亂世的備忘錄 / Breakazine! 045, bu ru wo di zhong tou li guo? ji xia yi lun luan shi de bei wang lu	Breakazine! 創作小組 / Breakazine! chuang zuo xiao zu			check			
2022-06-27	Breakazine! 044, 速食新聞：如何對抗被餵飼的命運 / Breakazine! 044, su shi xin wen: ru he dui kang bei wei si de ming yun	Breakazine! 創作小組 / Breakazine! chuang zuo xiao zu			check			
2022-06-27	Breakazine! 050, 仆直 / Breakazine! 050, puzhi	Breakazine! 創作小組 / Breakazine! chuang zuo xiao zu			check			
2022-06-27	Breakazine! 051, game is not over	Breakazine! 創作小組 / Breakazine! chuang zuo xiao zu			check			
2023-05-17	城之迷 / Cheng zhi mi	七等生 / Qidengsheng			check			
2023-05-17	2017年的權力遊戲 / 2017 nian de quan li you xi	吳子諭 / Wu, Ziyu.			check			
2023-05-17	中國大風險 / Zhongguo da feng xian	劉曉嵐 / Liu, Xiaolan.			check			
2023-05-17	中國内憂外患 : 強大的背後 / Zhongguo nei you wai huan : qiang da de bei hou	柯宇倩 / Ke, Yuqian.			check			
2023-05-17	中國民主運動史. 從中國之春到茉莉花革命潮 = History of Chinese democracy movement / Zhongguo min zhu yun dong shi. Cong Zhongguo zhu chun dao mo li hua ge ming chao	翁衍慶 / Weng, Yanqing.			check			
2023-05-17	中國民主運動史. 從延安王實味爭民主到西單民主牆 = History of Chinese democracy / Zhongguo min zhu yun dong shi. Cong Yan'an Wang Shiwei zheng min zhu dao Xidan min zhu qiang	翁衍慶 / Weng, Yanqing.			check			
2023-05-17	中國對抗世界 : 孕育中的戰爭 / Zhongguo dui kang shi jie : yun yu zhong de zhan zheng	周夷遠 / Zhou, Yiyuan.			check			
2023-05-17	中國錢局 / Zhongguo qian ju	郭長海 / Guo, Changhai.			check			
2023-05-17	出賣中國：權貴資本主義的起源與共產黨政權的潰敗	裴敏欣			check			
2023-05-17	中國改革的歧路 / Zhongguo gai ge de qi lu	朱嘉明 / Zhu, Jiaming.			check			
2023-05-17	中國的南海戰略 / Zhongguo de Nan Hai zhan lüe	蘇冠群 / Su, Guanqun.			check			
2023-05-17	中國新震盪 / Zhongguo xin zhen dang	中國研究院 / Zhongguo yan jiu yuan			check			
2023-05-17	毛澤東與周恩來 / Mao Zedong yu Zhou Enlai	辛史仁 / Xin, Shiren.			check			
2023-05-17	正在結束的中國奇蹟 / Zheng zai jie shu de Zhongguo qi ji	姚君安 (編輯) / Yao, Jun'an. (Editor)			check			
2023-05-17	周永康內部案卷 / Zhou Yongkang nei bu an juan	石光劍, 紀偉仁 / Shi, Guangjian., Ji, Weiren.			check			
2023-05-17	把脈中國 : 對習近平的第一手觀察 / Ba mai Zhongguo : dui Xi Jinping de di yi shou guan cha	林洸耀 / Lin, Guangyao.			check			
2023-05-17	民主, 民意與民粹 : 中港台觀察與批判 = Democracy, public opinion and populism : social observations and critiques of China, Hong Kong and Taiwan / Min zhu, min yi yu min cui : Zhong Gang Tai guan cha yu pi pan	張讚國 / Zhang, Zanguo.			check			
2023-05-17	中國對外政策 : 從江澤民到習近平 / Zhongguo dui wai zheng ce : cong Jiang Zemin dao Xi Jinping	胡聲平 / Hu, Shengping.			check			
2023-05-17	中國部委高官 / Zhongguo bu wei gao guan	杜菲 / Du, Fei.			check			
2023-05-17	南海之戰 : 決定中共生死 / Nan hai zhi zhan : jue ding zhong gong sheng si	牛大軍 / Niu, Dajun.			check			
2023-05-17	紅色滲透 : 中國媒體全球擴張的真相 / Hong se shen tou : Zhongguo mei ti quan qiu kuo zhang de zhen xiang	何清漣 / He, Qinglian.			check			
2023-05-17	美國新總統，中國新核心 : 川普PK習近平 / Meiguo xin zong tong, Zhongguo xin he xin : Chuanpu PK Xi Jinping	姚仲文 / Yao, Zhongwen.			check			
2023-05-17	習近平家事 / Xi Jinping jia shi	丁守誠 / Ding, Shoucheng.			check			
2023-05-17	最高層腐敗 : 政治局常委家族 / Zui gao ceng fu bai : zheng zhi ju chang wei jia zu	魯川海 / Lu, Chuanhai.			check			
2023-05-17	從胡錦濤到習近平 / Cong Hu Jintao dao Xi Jinping	李丹青 / Li, Danqing.			check			
2023-05-17	《美國肢解中國?》 : 解放軍第一鷹派夢囈與強國玻璃心的夢魘 / "Meiguo zhi jie Zhongguo?" : jie fang jun di yi ying pai meng yi yu qiang guo bo li xin de meng yan	袁紅冰 / Yuan, Hongbing.			check			
2023-05-17	抓捕徐才厚 / Zhua bu Xu Caihou	程君姬 / Cheng, Junji.			check			
2023-05-17	爭當老大 : 習近平的南中國海棋局 ; Zheng dang lao da : Xi Jinping de nan Zhongguo hai qi ju	伍君行 / Wu, Junxing.			check			
2023-05-17	習近平開明專制 / Xi Jinping kai ming zhuan zhi	陳小平 / Chen, Xiaoping.			check			
2023-05-17	習近平不是一個謎 / Xi Jinping bu shi yi ge mi	陳小平 / Chen, Xiaoping.			check			
2023-05-17	習近平權勢升級版 / Xi Jinping quan shi sheng ji ban	廖夢秋 / Liao, Mengqiu.			check			
2023-05-17	新"四人幫"和"太上皇" : 沒有結束的權鬥 / Xin "si ren bang" he "tai shang huang" : mei you jie su de quan dou	謝子長 / Xie, Zichang.			check			
2023-05-17	總理爭奪戰 / Zong li zheng duo zhan	謝凡平 / Xie, Fanping.			check			
2023-05-17	習近平川普的贏局 / Xi Jinping Chuanpu de ying ju	何頻 / He, Pin.			check			
2023-05-17	習近平的下一步 / Xi Jinping de xia yi bu	楊三運 / Yang, Sanyun.			check			
2023-05-17	習近平的政治試驗 / Xi Jinping de zheng zhi shi yan	周南欣 / Zhou, Nanxin.			check			
2023-05-17	幕後大佬曾慶紅 / Mu hou da lao ceng qing hong	于石坪 / Yu, Shiping.			check			
2023-05-17	中國經濟學家不敢告訴你的50個真相 / Zhongguo jing ji xue jia bu gan gao su ni de 50 ge zhen xiang	段育文 / Duan, Yuwe.			check			
2023-05-17	解放軍與文化大革命 / Jie fang jun yu wen hua da ge ming	丁凱文 / Ding, Kaiwen.			check			
2023-05-17	習近平的政治公關 / Xi Jinping de zheng zhi gong guan	黃博 / Huang, Bo.			check			
2023-05-17	左右大局 / Zuo you da ju	李慧玲 / Li, Huiling.			check			
2023-05-17	星火 / Xing huo	張仁星 / Zhang, Renxing.			check			
2023-05-17	香港正變 : 2017 普選的命運 / Xianggang zheng bian : 2017 pu xuan de ming yun	劉文策 / Liu, Wence.			check			
2023-05-17	死撐 / Si cheng	韓連山 / Han, Lianshan.			check			
2023-05-17	政海一聲笑 / Zheng hai yi sheng xiao	鄭家富 / Zheng, Jiafu.			check			
2023-05-17	爸爸媽媽上戰場 / Ba ba ma ma shang zhan chang	國民教育家長關注組 / Guo min jiao yu jia chang guan zhu zu			check			
2023-05-17	特區管治的挑戰 = Challenges in governance in Hong Kong / Te qu guan zhi de tiao zhan	葉健民 = Yep, Ray. , 公婷等 / Ye, Jianmin., Gong, Ting.			check			
2023-05-17	草木皆兵 邁向全面政治化社會 / Cao mu jie bing mai xiang quan mian zheng zhi hua she hui	陳景輝 / Chen, Jinghui.			check			
2023-05-17	感情缺失 : 香港情緖學 / Gan qing que shi : xiang gang qing xue	邵家臻 / Shao, Jiazhen.			check			
2023-05-17	一枝草一點露 / Yi zhi cao yi dian lu	顏純鈎 / Yan, Chungou.			check			
2023-05-17	教學小品 / Jiao xue xiao pin	趙志成 / Zhao, Zhicheng.			check			
2023-05-17	學習點點心 / Xue xi dian dian xin	趙志成 / Zhao, Zhicheng.			check			
2023-05-17	性教育是咁的 / Xing jiao yu shi han de	邵家臻, 鄭文 / Shao, Jiazhen., Zheng, Wen.			check			
2023-05-17	我係何式凝, 今年五十五歲 / Wo xi He Shining, jin nian wu shi wu sui	何式凝 = Ho, Sik Ying Petula. / He, Shining.			check			
2023-05-17	生鬼英語 = The power of practice / Sheng gui Ying yu	韓連山 / Han, Lianshan.			check			
2023-05-17	生鬼英語 = The power of practice. 2 / Sheng gui Ying yu = The power of practice. 2	韓連山 / Han, Lianshan.			check			
2023-05-17	生鬼英語. 3, 學而時習之 / Sheng gui Ying yu. 3, Xue er shi xi zhi	韓連山 / Han, Lianshan.			check			
2023-05-17	醫學霸權與香港醫療制度 / Yi xue ba quan yu xiang gang yi liao zhi du	佘雲楚 / She, Yunchu.			check			
2023-05-17	指罵詞彙裡的「八十前後」 / Zhi ma ci hui li de "ba shi qian hou"	邵家臻 / Shao, Jiazhen.			check			
2023-05-17	時代廢青 / Shi dai fei qing	邵家臻 / Shao, Jiazhen.			check			
2023-05-17	廢青救地球 / Fei qing jiu di qiu	邵家臻 / Shao, Jiazhen.			check			
2023-05-17	最壞的年代 : 最好的記者 = Finest Hour / Zui huai de nian dai : zui hao de ji zhe	蔡子強, 安裕 / Cai, Ziqiang., Anyu			check			
2023-05-17	八十後的生存與生活. 2 / Ba shi hou de sheng cun yu sheng huo. 2	健吾 / Jianwu.			check			
2023-05-17	這十年來著緊過的事 / Zhe shi nian lai zhe jin guo de shi	健吾 / Jianwu.			check			
2023-05-17	港事・港情・港議 / Gang shi, Gang qing, Gang yi	劉培榮 / Liu, Peirong.			check			
2023-05-17	性/别政治與本土起義 / Xing / bie zheng zhi yu ben tu qi yi	黃慧貞 = Wong, Wai-Ching Angela. (Editor), 蔡寶瓊 (Editor) / Huang, Huizhen., Cai, Baoqiong.			check			
2023-05-17	香港怎麼了? = What's going on in Hong Kong? / Xianggang zen me le?	王緝憲 / Wang, Jixian.			check			
2023-05-17	医学营养学 / Ko xue ying yang xue	郭红卫 (主编) / Guo, Hongwei. (Editor)			check			
2023-05-17	尋花 : 香港原生植物手札 / Xun hua : Xianggang yuan sheng zhi wu shou zha	葉曉文 / Ye, Xiaowen.			check			
2023-05-17	看見生命的火花：德國高齡社會紀行 / Sparks of life : the German experience with ageing / Kan jian sheng ming de huo hua : Deguo gao ling she hui ji xing	陳伊敏 / Chen, Yimin.			check			
2023-05-17	蔡英文與習近平的彼岸 / Cai Yingen yu Xi Jinping de bi an	江丁丁 / Jiang, Dingding.			check			
2023-05-17	當「崛起中國」遇上「太陽傘」 : 透視廿一世紀兩岸三地新關係 / Dang "Jue qi Zhongguo" yu shang "Tai yang san" : tou shi nian yi shi ji liang an san di xin guan xi	林泉忠 / Lin, Quanzhong.			check			
2022-06-22	一國兩制知多少 / Yi guo liang zhi zhi duo shao	劉清泉, 賴其之 / Liu, Qingquan., Lai, Qizhi.		check				
2022-06-22	官商同謀 : 香港公義私利的矛盾 = Uneasy partners : the conflict between public interest and private profit in Hong Kong / Guan shang tong mou : Xianggang gong yi si li de mao dun	顧汝德 / Goodstadt, Leo F.		check				
2022-06-22	23條立法日誌 / 23 tiao li fa ri zhi	吳靄儀 = Ng, Oi-yee = Ng, Margaret. / Wu, Aiyi.		check				
2022-06-22	滋蘭又樹蕙 / Zi lan you shu hui	司徒華 / Situ, Hua.		check				
2022-06-22	悲欣交集 / Bei xin jiao ji	司徒華 / Situ, Hua.		check				
2022-06-22	欄干拍遍 / Lan gan pai bian	司徒華 / Situ, Hua.		check				
2022-06-22	政治的道德 : 從自由主義的觀點看 / Zheng zhi de dao de : cong zi you zhu yi de guan dian kan	周保松 / Zhou, Baosong.		check				
2022-06-22	文字欲 : 回應時代的特寫新聞 = The writaholic : Hong Kong features / Wen zi yu : hui ying shi dai de te xie xin wen	譚蕙芸 = Tam, Wai-wan Vivian. / Tan, Huiyun.		check				
2022-06-22	勝讀十年書：毛孟靜名人專訪錄 / Sheng du shi nian shu : Mao Mengjing ming ren zhuan fang lu	毛孟靜 / Mao, Mengjing.		check				
2022-06-22	香港教育大零落 / Xianggang jiao yu da ling luo	彭志銘 / Peng, Zhiming.		check				
2022-06-22	守住這一代的思考 : 給公民社會的通識教育 = Guarding our mind : liberal studies for civil society / Shou zhu zhe yi dai de si kao : gei gong min she hui de tong shi jiao yu	教育工作關注組編輯小組 (編著) / Jiao yu gong zuo guan zhu zu bian ji xiao zu (Editor)		check				
2022-06-22	香港人的身份認同和價值觀 ; Xianggang ren de shen fen ren tong he jia zhi guan	周永新 / Zhou, Yongxin.		check				
2022-06-22	民主十問 = Ten questions on democracy / Min zhu shi wen	馬嶽 = Ma, Ngok. / Ma, Yue.		check	check			
2022-06-22	香港政治：發展歷程與核心課題 / 香港政治 : 發展歷程與核心課題 / Xianggang zheng zhi : fa zhan li cheng yu he xin ke ti	馬嶽 = Ma, Ngok. / Ma, Yue.		check				
2022-06-22	我的奇幻國情教育 / Wo de qi huan guo qing jiao yu	區家麟 / Ou, Jialin.		check				
2022-06-22	黃絲帶與傘，及小雞蛋 / Huang si dai yu san, ji xiao ji dan	江瓊珠 / Jiang, Qiongzhu.		check				
2022-06-22	被時代選中的我們 / Bei shi dai xuan zhong de wo men	傘下的人 / Sanxiaderen		check				
2022-06-22	正道·法治 : 寫在黎明之前 / Zheng dao, fa zhi : xie zai li ming zhi qian	陳文敏 = Chan, Man-mun Johannes. / Chen, Wenmin.		check				
2022-06-22	醜陋的中國人 / Chou lou de Zhongguo ren	柏楊 / Boyang		check				
2022-06-22	毛澤東的大饑荒 : 1958-1962年的中國浩劫史 = Mao's great famine : the history of China's most devastating catastrophe / Mao Zedong de da ji huang : 1958-1962 nian de Zhongguo hao jie shi	馮客 / Dikötter, Frank.		check				
2022-06-22	中國政治與文化 / Zhongguo zheng zhi yu wen hua	金耀基 / Jin, Yaoji.		check				
2022-06-22	十年動亂 / Shi nian dong luan	黑雁男 / Heiyannan		check				
2022-06-22	中國與民主 / Zhongguo yu min zhu	余英時 / Yu, Yingshi.		check				
2022-06-22	悲壯的民運 / Bei zhuang di min yun	方良柱等 (編輯) / Fang, Liangzhu. et al.		check				
2022-06-22	血洗京華實錄 : 香港文匯報記者組直擊報導 / Xue xi Jing hua shi lu : Xianggang wen hui bao ji zhe zu zhi ji bao dao	香港文滙報記者組 / Xianggang wen hui bao ji zhe zu		check				
2022-06-22	血沃中華 : 八九年北京學潮資料集續編 / Xue wo Zhonghua : ba jiu nian Beijing xue chao zi liao ji xu bian	何芝洲 / He, Zhizhou.		check				
2022-06-22	歲月蒼茫 : 我與兒子王丹 / Sui yue cang mang : wo yu er zi Wang Dan	王凌雲 / Wang, Lingyun.		check				
2022-06-22	血染的歷史 : 八九民運 / Xue ran de li shi : ba jiu min yun	馬龍 / Ma, Long.		check				
2022-06-22	改革歷程 = The secret journal of Zhao Ziyang / Gai ge li cheng	趙紫陽 / Zhao, Ziyang.		check				
2022-06-22	「文革」中的周恩來 / "Wen ge" zhong de Zhou Enlai	劉武生 / Liu, Wusheng.		check				
2022-06-22	是荒誕又如何 / Shi huang dan you ru he	陳冠中 / Chen, Guanzhong.		check				
2022-06-22	裸命 / Luo ming	陳冠中 / Chen, Guanzhong.		check				
2022-06-22	中共在香港 / Zhong gong zai Xianggang	江關生 / Jiang, Guansheng.		check				
2022-06-22	釋放香港 : 讓我們活得更好! / Shi fang Xianggang : rang wo men huo de geng hao!	黎廣德 / Li, Guangde.		check				
2022-06-22	我們的日子為什麼這麼難 / Wo men de ri zi wei shen me zhe me nan	郎咸平 / Lang, Xianping.		check				
2022-06-22	香港選舉制度透視 / Xianggang xuan ju zhi du tou shi	蔡子強 / Cai, Ziqiang.		check				
2022-06-22	選舉制度的政治效果 : 港式比例代表制的經驗 / Xuan ju zhi du de zheng zhi xiao guo : Gang shi bi li dai biao zhi de jing yan	馬嶽 = Ma, Ngok., 蔡子強 / Ma, Yue., Cai, Ziqiang.		check				
2022-06-22	國家的囚徒 : 趙紫陽的秘密錄音 = Prisoner of the state / Guo jia de qiu tu : Zhao Ziyang de mi mi lu yin	趙紫陽 / Zhao, Ziyang.		check				
2022-06-22	新聞與香港社會真相 / Xin wen yu Xianggang she hui zhen xiang	黃天賜 / Huang, Tianci.		check				
2022-06-22	中華人民共和國史. 第4卷, 烏托邦運動 : 從大躍進到大饑荒, 1958-1961 / Zhonghua Renmin Gongheguo shi. Di 4 juan, Wutuobang yun dong : cong da yue jin dao da ji huang, 1958-1961	林蘊暉 / Lin, Yunhui.		check				
2022-06-22	中華人民共和國史. 第5卷, 歷史的變局 : 從挽救危機到反修防修, 1962-1965 / Zhonghua Renmin Gongheguo shi. Di 5 juan, Li shi de bian ju : cong wan jiu wei ji dao fan xiu fang xiu, 1962-1965	錢庠理 / Qian, Xiangli.		check				
2022-06-22	中華人民共和國史. 第8卷, 難以繼續的「繼續革命」 : 從批林到批鄧, 1972-1976 / Zhonghua Renmin Gongheguo shi. Di 8 juan, Nan yi ji xu de "ji xu ge ming" : cong pi Lin dao pi Deng, 1972-1976	史雲, 李丹慧 / Shi, Yun., Lim Danhui.		check				
2022-06-22	我在哈佛的日子 / Wo zai Hafo de ri zi	王丹 / Wang, Dan.		check				
2022-06-22	紅色滲透 : 中國媒體全球擴張的真相 / Hong se shen tou : Zhongguo mei ti quan qiu kuo zhang de zhen xiang	何清漣 / He, Qinglian.		check				
2022-06-22	開拓通識 : 知識份子的香港路 / Kai tuo tong shi : zhi shi fen zi de Xianggang lu	陳智傑 / Chen, Zhijie.		check				
2022-06-22	潮爆中国 : 新新中国城市文化笔记 = Chic China chic / Chao bao Zhongguo : Xin xin Zhongguo cheng shi wen hua bi ji = Chic China chic	李照兴 / Li, Zhaoxing.		check				
2022-06-22	你不敢正視的超級中國 : 看13億人口、中國錢如何吞下全世界 = Super China / Ni bu gan zheng shi de chao ji Zhongguo : kan 13 yi ren kou, Zhongguo qian ru he tun xia quan shi jie	KBS《超級中國》製作團隊 / KBS "Chao ji Zhongguo" zhi zuo tuan dui		check				
2022-06-22	陌生的中国人 = The Strange Chinese People / Mo sheng de Zhongguo ren	楊猛 / Yang, Meng.		check				
2022-06-22	鍍金中國 : 大國雄起的虛與實 / Du jin Zhongguo : da guo xiong qi de xu yu shi	許知遠 / Xu, Zhiyuan.		check				
2022-06-22	中國 : 練乙錚文集 I / Zhongguo : Lian Yizheng wen ji I	練乙錚 = Lian, Y. Joseph. / Lian, Yizheng.		check				
2022-06-22	香港 : 練乙錚文集 II / Xianggang : Lian Yizheng wen ji II	練乙錚 = Lian, Y. Joseph. / Lian, Yizheng.		check				
2022-06-22	國力 : 練乙錚文集 III / Guo li : Lian Yizheng wen ji III	練乙錚 = Lian, Y. Joseph. / Lian, Yizheng.		check				
2022-06-22	港理 : 練乙錚文集 IV / Gang li : Lian Yizheng wen ji IV	練乙錚 = Lian, Y. Joseph. / Lian, Yizheng.		check				
2022-06-22	人民 : 練乙錚文集 V / Ren wen : Lian Yizheng wen ji V	練乙錚 = Lian, Y. Joseph. / Lian, Yizheng.	check	check				
2022-06-22	博弈 : 練乙錚文集 VI / Bo yi : Lian Yizheng wen ji VI	練乙錚 = Lian, Y. Joseph. / Lian, Yizheng.		check				
2022-06-22	国情. 2, 黨国體制 / Guo qing. 2, Dang guo ti zhi	潘小濤 / Pan, Xiaotao.		check				
2022-06-22	国情. 3, 維穩壓倒一切 / Guo qing. 3, Wei wen ya dao yi qie	潘小濤 / Pan, Xiaotao.		check				
2022-06-22	中國恐怖嗎? : 內地八〇後青年如何反洗腦 / Zhongguo kong bu ma? : nei di ba ling hou qing nian ru he fan xi nao	許驥 / Xu, Ji.		check				
2022-06-22	這就是中國 : 拆穿黨國謊言 / Zhe jiu shi Zhongguo : chai chuan dang guo huang yan	呂秉權 / Lü, Bingquan.		check				
2022-06-22	中國無法偉大的50個理由 = Fault lines on the face of China : 50 reasons why China may never be great / Zhongguo wu fa wei da de 50 ge li you	Marriott, David., Lacroix, Karl.		check				
2022-06-22	細良好讀, 看中國 / Xiliang hao du, kan Zhongguo	劉細良 / Liu, Xiliang.		check				
2022-06-22	出賣中國 : 權貴資本主義的起源與共產黨政權的潰敗 / Chu mai Zhongguo : quan gui zi ben zhu yi de qi yuan yu Gong chan dang zheng quan de kui bai	裴敏欣 / Pei, Minxin.		check				
2022-06-22	中國悄悄占領全世界 = China's silent army : the pioneers, traders, fixers, and workers who are remaking the world in Beijing's image / Zhongguo qiao qiao zhan ling quan shi jie	Cardenal, Juan Pablo., Araújo, Heriberto.		check				
2022-06-22	一包內褲看中國 = Where underpants come from : from checkout to cotton field : travels through the new China and into the new global economy / Yi bao nei ku kan Zhongguo	Bennett, Joe.		check				
2022-06-22	我不信中國模式 / Wo bu xin Zhongguo mo shi	蔡東豪 / Cai, Donghao.		check				
2022-06-22	如水赴壑 : 香港歷史與意識之流 / Ru shui fu he : Xianggang li shi yu yi shi zhi liu	盧斯達 / Lu, Sida.		check				
	自由山岳 / Xi you shan yue	陳以晉 / Chen, Yijin.		check				
	消失了的連儂牆 / Xiao shi liao de lian nong qiang	愛護香港的人 (主編) / Ai hu Xianggang de ren (Editor)		check			check	
	Add ink : cartoon chronicles of life in Hong Kong	Harrison, Harry.		check				
	六四詩選 = An anthology of June Fourth poetry / Liu si shi xuan	孟浪 (主輯) / Meng, Lang.		check				
		陶傑 / Tao, Jie.		criticized by Education Bureau inspectors				
		李碧華 / Li, Bihua.		criticized by Education Bureau inspectors				
		龍應台 / Long, Yingtai.		criticized by Education Bureau inspectors				
		陳冠中 / Chen, Guanzhong.		criticized by Education Bureau inspectors				
		顧汝德 / Goodstadt, Leo F.		criticized by Education Bureau inspectors				
		魯迅 / Lu Xun		criticized by Education Bureau inspectors				
2022-06-27	中華人民共和國史十五講 / Zhonghua Renmin Gongheguo shi shi wu jiang	王丹 / Wang, Dan.			check			
2022-06-27	末日倖存者的獨白 : 劉曉波的「六四」回憶錄 / Mo ri xing cun zhe de du bai : Liu Xiaobo de "liu si" hui yi lu	劉曉波 / Liu, Xiaobo.			check			
2022-05-27		山道文化 (出版社) = Hillway Culture / Shan dao wen hua (Publisher)	disqualified from participating in Hong Kong Book Fair					
2022-05-27		有種文化 (出版社) = Kind of Culture / You zhong wen hua (Publisher)	disqualified from participating in Hong Kong Book Fair					
2022-05-27		蜂鳥出版 (出版社) = Humming Publishing / Feng niao chu ban (Publisher)	disqualified from participating in Hong Kong Book Fair					
2022-09-06	時代的行動者 : 反修例運動群像 = Actors in the contention of our time : portraits of the Anti-ELAB Movement / Shi dai de xing dong zhe : fan xiu li yun dong qun xiang	李立峯 (編輯) = Lee, Francis L. F. / Li, Lifeng (Editor)					banned by bookstores under Sino United Publishing	
2022-09-06	社運年代 : 香港抗爭政治的軌跡 / She yun nian dai : Xianggang kang zheng zheng zhi de gui ji	鄭煒 (編輯), 袁瑋熙 (編輯) / Yuan, Weixi. (Editor), Zheng, Wei. (Editor)					banned by bookstores under Sino United Publishing	
2022-09-06	文革時期中國農村的集體殺戮 / Wen ge shi qi Zhongguo nong cun de ji ti sha lu	蘇陽 / Su, Yang.					banned by bookstores under Sino United Publishing	
2022-09-06	盛世 : 中國· 2013年 / Sheng shi : Zhongguo, 2013 nian	陳冠中 / Chen, Guanzhong.					banned by bookstores under Sino United Publishing	
2022-09-06	裸命 / Luo ming	陳冠中 / Chen, Guanzhong.					banned by bookstores under Sino United Publishing	
2022-09-06	建豐二年 : 新中國烏有史 = The second year of Jianfeng : an alternative history of new China	陳冠中 / Chen, Guanzhong.					banned by bookstores under Sino United Publishing	
2022-09-06	北京零公里 / Beijing ling gong li	陳冠中 / Chen, Guanzhong.					banned by bookstores under Sino United Publishing	
2022-09-06	眾裏尋她 : 公義在香港 / Zhong li xun ta : gong yi zai Xianggang	陳文敏 = Chan, Johannes Man-mun. / Chen, Wenmin.					banned by bookstores under Sino United Publishing	
2021-04-06	夏愨佔領圖 = Harcourt Village scroll / Xiaque zhan ling tu	貓珊 / Maoshan Connie					check	
2021-04-06	年初一紀事相集 / Nian chu yi ji shi xiang ji	90後社會紀實 / 90 hou she hui ji shi					check	
2021-04-06	雨傘見聞錄 = "Umbrella chronicle" / Yu san jian wen lu	Chow, Simon.					check	
2021-04-06	反送中攝影集 : 年輕的苦難 / Fan song Zhong she ying ji : nian qing de ku nan	天爸 / Tianba					check	
2021-04-06	反抗的共同體 二0一九香港反送中運動 / Fan kang de gong tong ti : er ling yi jiu Xianggang fan song Zhong yun dong	馬嶽 = Ma, Ngok. / Ma, Yue.					check	
2021-04-06	死水的漪淪 : 反送中運動攝影集 / Si shui de yi lun : fan song Zhong yun dong she ying ji	黃慧而等 (編輯) / Huang, Hui'er. et al. (Editor)					check	
2022-11-10	神州故國遊 / Shenzhou gu guo you	陳雲 / Chen, Yun.					check	
2022-11-10	溫水劇場 : 歡迎來到新時代! / Wen shui ju chang : huan ying lai dao xin shi dai!	白水 / Bai, Shui.					check	
2022-11-10	溫水劇場二零一四 : 高溫派對 / Wen shui ju chang er ling yi si : gao wen pai dui	白水 / Bai, Shui.					check	
2022-11-10	爆笑教室. 8 = Funny classroom. 8 / Bao xiao jiao shi. 8	葛雋 / Ge Juan.					check	
2022-11-10	爆笑教室. 11 = Funny classroom. 11 / Bao xiao jiao shi. 11	葛雋 / Ge Juan.					check	
2022-11-10	漫畫爆笑教室 : 小學雞·大作戰 / Man hua bao xiao jiao shi：xiao xue ji, da zuo zhan = Funny classroom	葛雋 / Ge Juan.					check	
2022-11-10	國民教育謀殺案 / Guo min jiao yu mou sha an	葛雋 / Ge Juan.					check	
2022-11-10	政總留守抗爭日記 / Zheng zong liu shou kang zheng ri ji	留守十子 / Liushoushizi					check	
2022-11-10	殖民地美學 / Zhi min di mei xue	陳雲, 甄小慧 / Chen, Yun., Zhen, Xiaohui.					check	
2023-02-04	去過北韓 50 次, 你問我答 / Qu guo Bei Han 50 ci, ni wen wo da	陳成軍, 張振華 / Chen, Chengjun., Zhang, Zhenhua.					check	
2023-05-12	九七劇場 / Jiu qi ju chang	尊子等 / Zunzi. et al.	check					
2023-05-12	教育眼 / Jiao yu yan	鍾明新等 / Zhong, Mingxin. et al.	check					
2023-05-12	紐紐約約 / Niu niu yue yue	尊子, 陳也 / Zunzi., Chen, Ye.	check					
2023-05-12	拜拜巴黎 = Au revoir Paris / Bai bai Bali	尊子, 陳也 / Zunzi., Chen, Ye.	check					
2023-05-12	黑材料 : 尊子漫畫集 / Hei cai liao : Zunzi man hua ji	尊子 / Zunzi	check					
2023-05-12	混帳東西 : 尊子漫畫二集 / Hun zhang dong xi : Zunzi man hua er ji	尊子 / Zunzi	check					
2023-05-12	過渡期'91 - '92漫畫集 / Guo du qi '91 - '92 man hua ji	尊子, 馬龍, 一木 / Zunzi, Yimu, Ma, Long.	check					
2023-05-12	黑旋風 / Hei xuan feng	黃琉 / Huang, Liu.	check					
2023-05-12	七情上面 : 中港台一百政治人物漫像 = Politicians : 100 caricatures of China, Taiwan & Hong Kong / Qi qing shang mian : Zhong Gang Tai yi bai zheng zhi ren wu man xiang	尊子 / Zunzi.	check					
2023-05-12	鄧伯爺 / Deng bo ye	尊子 / Zunzi.	check					
2023-05-12	乜議員正傳 : 1993.6-1997.3 / Mie yi yuan zheng zhuan : 1993.6-1997.3	尊子 / Zunzi.	check					
2023-05-12	1997.9977	王亥等 / Wang, Hai. et al.	check					
2023-05-12	長者10大喜愛政治人物調查報告 / Zhang zhe 10 da xi ai zheng zhi ren wu diao cha bao gao	基督教香港信義會沙田長者綜合服務 = Evangelical Lutheran Church Social Service of Hong Kong, 香港浸會大學社會工作系 = Hong Kong Baptist University Department of Social Work / Jidu jiao Xianggang xin yi hui Shatian zhang zhe zong he fu wu, Xianggang jin hui da xue she hui gong zuo xi	check					
2023-05-12	媽媽的好幫手 / Ma ma de hao bang shou	香港中文大學手語及聾人研究中心, 尊子 / Xianggang Zhong wen da xue shou yu ji long ren yan jiu zhong xin, Zunzi.	check					
2023-05-12	媽媽的生日禮物 / Ma ma de sheng ri li wu	香港中文大學手語及聾人研究中心, 尊子 / Xianggang Zhong wen da xue shou yu ji long ren yan jiu zhong xin, Zunzi.	check					
2023-05-12	超市好節目 / Chao shi hao jie mu	香港中文大學手語及聾人研究中心, 尊子 / Xianggang Zhong wen da xue shou yu ji long ren yan jiu zhong xin, Zunzi.	check					
2023-05-12	到公園去散步 / Dao gong yuan qu san bu	香港中文大學手語及聾人研究中心, 尊子 / Xianggang Zhong wen da xue shou yu ji long ren yan jiu zhong xin, Zunzi.	check					
2023-05-12	物歸原主 / Wu gui yuan zhu	香港中文大學手語及聾人研究中心, 尊子 / Xianggang Zhong wen da xue shou yu ji long ren yan jiu zhong xin, Zunzi.	check					
2023-05-12	人民不會忘記 : 八九民運實錄 / Ren min bu hui wang ji : ba jiu min yun shi lu	六十四名香港記者 / Liu shi si ming Xianggang ji zhe	check			check		
2023-05-12	六四餘震︰中國民運夭折, 東歐怒潮澎湃 六四餘震 : 中國民運夭折, 東歐怒潮澎湃 / Liu si yu zhen : Zhongguo min yun yao zhe, Dong Ou nu chao peng pai	陸斯 / Lu, Si.	check					
2023-05-12	天安門的反思 / Tian'anmen de fan si	程翔 / Ching, Cheong.	check					
2023-05-12	歷史的見證 : 天安門廣塲1989.4.15-6.4 = Testimonial to history / Li shi de jian zheng : Tian'an men guang chang 1989.4.15-6.4	大公報 (主編) / Da gong bao (Editor)	check					
2023-05-12	我是記者 : 六四印記 / Wo shi jizhe : liu si yinji	60名新聞工作者 / 60 ming xinwen gongzuo zhe	check					
2023-05-12	六四二〇 / Liu si er ling	陳潤芝 / Chen, Runzhi.	check					
2023-05-12	一個解放軍的1989 / Yi ge jie fang jun de 1989	蔡錚 / Cai, Zheng.	check					
2023-05-12	民運精英大起底 / Min yun jing ying da qi di	武聞 / Wuwen	check					
2023-05-12	再回家 / Zai hui jia	麥燕庭 / Mai, Yanting.	check					
2023-05-12	血路1989 / Xue lu 1989	孔捷生 / Kong, Jiesheng.	check					
2023-05-12	我要回家—我要回家—我 / Wo yao hui jia—wo yao hui jia—Wo	張炳玲 / Zhang, Bingling.	check					
2023-05-12	和天安門母親一起 / He Tiananmen mu qin yi qi	許朗養, 區美寳, 陳詩韻 / Xu, Langyang., Ou, Meibao., Chen, Shiyun.	check					
2023-05-12	趙紫陽的秘密 / Zhao Ziyang de mi mi	吳曉璐 / Wu, Xiaolu.	check					
2023-05-12	歷史的大爆炸 : 「六四」事件全景實錄 / Li shi de da bao zha : " Liu si " shi jian quan jing shi lu	張萬舒 / Zhang, Wanshu.	check					
2023-05-12	天安門 : 中國的知識份子與革命 = The gate of heavenly peace : the Chinese and their revolution 1895-1980 / Tian'anmen : Zhongguo de zhi shi fen zi yu ge ming	史景遷 / Spence, Jonathan D.	check					
2023-05-12	我在寒冷中獨行 : 王丹獄中詩 / Wo zai han leng zhong du xing : Wang Dan yu zhong shi	王丹 / Wang, Dan.	check					
2023-05-12	六四十三週年特刊 / Liu si shi san zhou nian te kan	第三十二屆香港中文大學學生會中大學生報出版委員會 / Di san shi er jie Xianggang Zhong wen da xue xue sheng hui Zhong da xue sheng bao chu ban wei yuan hui	check					
2023-05-12	六四未圓永沒完 : 六四十二年特刊 / Liu si wei yuan yong mei wan : liu si shi er nian te kan	鄧小樺等 / Deng, Xiaohua. et al.	check					
2023-05-12	天安門盲點 / Tian'an Men mang dian	白日見 / Bai, Rijian.	check					
2023-05-12	目击天安门. 第一卷 / Mu ji tian an men. Di yi juan	韩泰伦 (主编) / Han, Tailun. (Editor)	check					
2023-05-12	目击天安门. 第二卷 / Mu ji tian an men. Di er juan	韩泰伦 (主编) / Han, Tailun. (Editor)	check					
2023-05-12	目击天安门. 第三卷 / Mu ji tian an men. Di san juan	韩泰伦 (主编) / Han, Tailun. (Editor)	check					
2023-05-12	目击天安门. 第四卷 / Mu ji tian an men. Di si juan	韩泰伦 (主编) / Han, Tailun. (Editor)	check					
2023-05-12	相信 : 六四十一周年專號 / Xiang xin : liu si shi yi zhou nian zhuan hao	香港中文大學學生會中大學生報 / Xianggang Zhong wen da xue xue sheng hui Zhong da xue sheng bao	check					
2023-05-12	六・四民運史 / Liu si min yun shi	韓文甫 / Han, Wenfu.	check					
2023-05-12	血染的歷史 : 八九民運 / Xue ran de li shi : ba jiu min yun	馬龍 / Ma, Long.	check					
2023-05-12	天安门上看中国 = China seen from Tiananmen / Tian'anmen shang kan Zhongguo	黄彦 (主编), 安庆国 (主编) / An, Qingguo. (Editor), Huang, Yan. (Editor)	check					
2023-05-12	王丹獄中家書 / Wang Dan yu zhong jia shu	王丹 / Wang, Dan.	check					
2023-05-12	聽風隨筆 : 王丹獄中詩文集 / Ting feng sui bi : Wang Dan yu zhong shi wen ji	王丹 / Wang, Dan.	check					
2023-05-12	六四追擊漫畫冊 : 時光倒流八九年 / Liu si zhui ji man hua ce : shi guang dao liu ba jiu nian	香港天主教正義和平委員會國是組 / Xianggang tian zhu jiao zheng yi he ping wei yuan hui guo shi zu	check					
2023-05-12	天安門：中國的知識分子與革命 / Tian'anmen : Zhongguo di zhi zhi fen zi yu ge ming	史景遷 / Spence, Jonathan D.	check					
2023-05-12	天安門悲歌 / Tia nan men bei ge	師東兵 / Shi, Dongbing.	check					
2023-05-12	天安门广场历史档案 / Tian'an Men guang chang li shi dang an	树军 / Shu, Jun.	check					
2023-05-12	走上天安门 / Zou shang Tian'anmen	董保存 / Dong, Baocun.	check					
2023-05-12	天安门广场风云录 / Tian an men guang chang feng yun lu	金岸 / Jin, an.	check					
2023-05-12	天安門之變 : 八九民運史 / Tian'an Men zhi bian : ba jiu min yun shi	陳小雅 / Chen, Xiaoya.	check					
2023-05-12	「六四」受難者名册 / "Liu si" shou nan zhe ming ce	丁子霖 / Ding, Zilin.	check					
2023-05-12	六四受難者尋訪實錄 : 永誌不忘 / Liu si shou nan zhe xun fang shi lu : yong zhi bu wang	丁子霖 / Ding, Zilin.	check					
2023-05-12	中國民運反思 / Zhongguo min yun fan si	胡平 / Hu, Ping.	check					
2023-05-12	天安门下的握手 : 北平和平解放内幕 / Tian'an Men xia di wo shou : Beiping he ping jie fang nei mu	舒云 / Shu, Yun.	check					
2023-05-12	天安門評論 = Tiananmen review / Tian'an men ping lun	天安門民主大學海外復校計劃香港籌備處 / Tia nan men min zhu da xue hai wai fu jiao ji hua Xianggang chou bei chu	check					
2023-05-12	八九中國民運資料册 / Ba jiu Zhongguo min yun zi liao ce	香港中文大學學生會 / Xianggang Zhong wen da xue xue sheng hui	check					
2023-05-12	六四血紅的黎明 : 加拿大華人紀念八九民運詩文及圖片選集 = The blood red dawn on June 4 : selected essays of Chinese Canadians supporting the pro-democracy movement in China (with photographs) 加拿大華人紀念八九民運詩文及圖片選集 / Jianada Hua ren ji nian ba jiu min yun shi wen ji tu pian xuan ji	多倫多支援中國民運出版基金 / Duolunduo zhi yuan Zhongguo min yun chu ban ji jin	check					
2023-05-12	八九民運的回顧與前瞻 : 六四週年紀念特輯 / Ba jiu min yun de hui gu yu qian zhan : Liu si zhou nian ji nian te ji	新苗社 / Xin miao she	check					
2023-05-12	血與淚 : 八九學運札記 / Xue yu lei : ba jiu xue yun zha ji	凌峰 / Ling, Feng.	check					
2023-05-12	天安門之火 : 一九八九中國民主運動畫册 / Tian'an men zhi huo : yi jiu ba jiu Zhongguo min zhu yun dong hua ce	利志達 / Li, Zhida.	check					
2023-05-12	火在燒. 血在燒 : 獻給天安門勇士 / Huo zai shao, xue zai shao : xian gei Tian'an men yong shi	行政院新聞局 (編印) / Xing zheng yuan xin wen ju (Editor)	check					
2023-05-12	北京學運 : 歴史的見證 / Beijing xue yun : li shi de jian zheng	《北京學運》編輯委員會 / "Beijing xue yun" bian ji wei yuan hui	check					
2023-05-12	血洗京華實錄 : 香港文匯報記者組直擊報導 / Xue xi Jing hua shi lu : Xianggang wen hui bao ji zhe zu zhi ji bao dao	香港文滙報記者組 / Xianggang wen hui bao ji zhe zu	check					
2023-05-12	兩次天安門事件 / Liang ci Tian'anmen shi jian	刑天 (編輯), 一葉 (編輯) / Xing, Tian. (Editor), Yi, Ye. (Editor)	check					
2023-05-12	嘶叫與回響／ / Si jiao yu hui xiang	「香港電台」記者, 馮玉蓮等 / "Xianggang dian tai" ji zhe, Feng, Yulian.	check					
2023-05-12	天安门一九八九年 / Tian'an men yi jiu ba jiu nian	聯合報編輯部編 / Lian he bao bian ji bu	check					
2023-05-12	Prisoner of the State: The Secret Journal of Premier Zhao Ziyang	Ziyang, Zhao.	check					
2023-05-12	China since Tiananmen : from Deng Xiaoping to Hu Jintao	Fewsmith, Joseph.	check					
2023-05-12	Living with Reform : China since 1989	Cheek, Timothy.	check					
2023-05-12	Beyond Tiananmen : the politics of U.S.-China relations, 1989-2000	Suettinger, Robert.	check					
2023-05-12	The Tiananmen Square massacre	Barth, Kelly.	check					
2023-05-12	Chinese Democracy after Tiananmen	Ding, Yijiang.	check					
2023-05-12	After the Fall : 1989 and the Future of Freedom	Katsiaficas, George.	check					
2023-05-12	China since Tiananmen : the politics of transition	Fewsmith, Joseph.	check					
2023-05-12	Lili : a novel of Tiananmen	Wang, Ban.	check					
2023-05-12	The power of Tiananmen : state-society relations and the 1989 Beijing student movement	Zhao, Dingxin.	check					
2023-05-12	The Tiananmen papers	Zhang, Liang., Nathan, Andrew J., Link, Perry.	check					
2023-05-12	Quelling the People : The Military Suppression of the Beijing Democracy Movement	Brook, Timothy.	check					
2023-05-12	China live : two decades in the heart of the dragon	Chinoy, Mike.	check					
2023-05-12	Hong Kong's social movements : forces from the margins	Woodman, Sophia.	check					
2023-05-12	Summer of betrayal : a novel	Hong, Ying., Avery, Martha.	check					
2023-05-12	Political pragmatism on the Chinese campus since 1989	Chan, Che-po.	check					
2023-05-12	鄧小平的遺產 ; 江澤民的困境 = The legacy of Tiananmen: China in disarray / Deng Xiaoping de yi chan ; Jiang Zemin de kun jing	Miles, James A. R.	check					
2023-05-12	The ordinary and the extraordinary : an anthropological study of Chinese reform and the 1989 People's Movement in Beijing	Pieke, Frank N.	check					
2023-05-12	China after Deng Xiaoping : the power struggle in Beijing since Tiananmen	Lam, Wo-Lap Willy.	check					
2023-05-12	China and the American dream : a moral inquiry	Madsen, Richard.	check					
2023-05-12	China Since Tiananmen : Political, Economic and Social Conflicts - Documents and Analysis	Sullivan, Nancy.	check					
2023-05-12	Wild Lily, Prairie Fire : China's Road to Democracy, Yan'an to Tian'anmen, 1942-1989	Benton, Gregor., Hunter, Alan.	check					
2023-05-12	The factual account of a search for the June 4 victims	Ding, Zilin.	check					
2023-05-12	The Chinese People's Movement : perspectives on spring, 1989	Saich, Tony. (Editor)	check					
2023-05-12	Mandate of heaven : a new generation of entrepreneurs, dissidents, Bohemians and technocrats lays claim to China's future	Schell, Orville.	check					
2023-05-12	Neither gods nor emperors : students and the struggle for democracy in China	Calhoun, Craig J.	check					
2023-05-12	Popular protest and political culture in modern China	Wasserstrom, Jeffrey N. (Editor), Perry, Elizabeth J. (Editor)	check					
2023-05-12	Resistance, chaos, and control in China : Taiping rebels, Taiwanese ghosts, and Tiananmen	Weller, Robert P.	check					
2023-05-12	Black hands of Beijing : lives of defiance in China's democracy movement	Black, George., Munro, Robin.	check					
2023-05-12	Chinese democracy and the crisis of 1989 : Chinese and American reflections	Des Forges, Roger V., Luo, Ning., Wu, Yen-bo.	check					
2023-05-12	北京風波紀實 = The truth about the Beijing turmoil / Beijing feng bo ji shi	《北京風波紀實》編委會 (編輯) / "Beijing feng bo ji shi" bian wei hui (Editor)	check					
2023-05-12	Popular protest and political culture in modern China	Wasserstrom, Jeffrey N. (Editor), Perry, Elizabeth J. (Editor)	check					
2023-05-12	The aftermath of the 1989 Tiananmen crisis in mainland China	Lin, Bih-jaw.	check					
2023-05-12	The dragon's brood : conversations with young Chinese	Rice, David.	check					
2023-05-12	The struggle for Tiananmen : anatomy of the 1989 mass movement	Lin, Nan.	check					
2023-05-12	Tiananmen Square, spring 1989 : a chronology of the Chinese democracy movement	Han, Theodore., Li, John.	check					
2023-05-12	Almost a revolution	Shen, Tong., Yen, Marianne.	check					
2023-05-12	Chaos Under Heaven : the Shocking Story of China's Search for Democracy	Thomas, Gordon.	check					
2023-05-12	China's students : the struggle for democracy	Cherrington, Ruth.	check					
2023-05-12	The dragons of Tiananmen : Beijing as a sacred city	Meyer, Jeffrey F.	check					
2023-05-12	Lee Kuan Yew on China and Hongkong after Tiananmen	Lee, Kuan Yew.	check					
2023-05-12	Worm-eaten hinges : tensions and turmoil in Shanghai, 1988-9	Grant, Joan.	check					
2023-05-12	Behind the Tiananmen Massacre : Social, Political, and Economic Ferment in China	Zheng, Zhuyuan.	check					
2023-05-12	Beijing Spring 1989: Confrontation and Conflict - The Basic Documents	Oksenberg, Michel C.	check					
2023-05-12	China : from the Long March to Tiananmen Square	Associated Press	check					
2023-05-12	Chinese society on the eve of Tiananmen : the impact of reform	Davis, Deborah., Vogel, Ezra F.	check					
2023-05-12	Cries For Democracy : Writings and Speeches from the Chinese Democracy Movement	Han, Minzhu.	check					
2023-05-12	Moving the mountain : my life in China from the cultural revolution to Tiananmen Square	Li, Lu.	check					
2023-05-12	The Broken mirror : China after Tiananmen	Hicks, George L., Asai, Motofumi.	check					
2023-05-12	Beijing spring	Turnley, David C., Turnley, Peter., Liu, Melinda.	check					
2023-05-12	Crisis at Tiananmen : reform and reality in modern China	Yi, Mu., Thompson, Mark V.	check					
2023-05-12	Massacre in Beijing : China's struggle for democracy	Morrison, Donald.	check					
2023-05-12	Tiananmen	Chua, Morgan.	check					
2023-05-12	Tiananmen : the rape of Peking	Fathers, Michael., Higgins, Andrew., Cottrell, Robert.	check					
2023-05-12	Tiananmen diary : thirteen days in June	Salisbury, Harrison E.	check					
2023-05-12	Tiananmen Square = Tʻien-an-men	Simmie, Scott., Nixon, Bob.	check					
2023-05-15		吳靄儀 = Ng, Oi-yee = Ng, Margaret. / Wu, Aiyi.	all works banned					
2023-05-15		區家麟 / Ou, Jialin.	all works banned					
2023-05-15		許寶強 / Xu, Baoqiang.	all works banned					
2023-05-15		程翔 / Ching, Cheong.	all works banned					
2023-05-15		呂秉權 / Lü, Bingquan.	all works banned					
2023-05-15		馬嶽 = Ma, Ngok. / Ma, Yue.	all works banned					
2023-05-15		李怡 / Li, Yi.	all works banned					
2023-05-15		戴耀廷 / Dai, Yaoting.	all works banned					
2023-05-15		徐承恩 = Tsui, Sing Yan Eric. / Xu, Cheng'en.	all works banned					
2023-05-15		沈旭暉 = Shen, Simon. / Shen, Xuhui.	all works banned					
2023-05-15		廖亦武 / Liao, Yiwu.	all works banned					
2023-05-15		吳志森 = Ng, Chi-sum. / Wu, Zhisen.	all works banned					
2023-05-15		曾志豪 / Zeng, Zhihao.	all works banned					
2023-05-15		黃照達 / Huang, Zhaoda.	all works banned					
2023-05-15		毛孟靜 / Mao, Mengjing.	all works banned					
2023-05-15		鄺俊宇 / Kuang, Junyu.	all works banned					
2023-05-15		梁家傑 / Leong, Kah-kit Alan.	all works banned					
2023-05-15		司徒華 / Situ, Hua.	all works banned					
2023-05-15		許知遠 / Xu, Zhiyuan.	all works banned					
2023-05-15		余杰 / Yu, Jie.	all works banned					
2023-05-15		劉仲敬 / Liu, Zhongjing.	all works banned					
2023-04-29		李登輝 / Li, Denghui.	all works banned					
2023-05-14	對基本法的基本看法 / Dui ji ben fa de ji ben kan fa	司徒華, 李柱銘 / Situ, Hua., Li, Juming.	check					
2023-05-14	永遠懷念司徒華 = In memory of Szeto Wah	司徒華家人 (編印) / Szeto Wah jia ren (Editor)	check					
2023-05-14	躁動的帝國 : 從清帝國的普世主義, 到中國的民族主義, 一部250年的中國對外關係史 = Restless empire : China and the world since 1750 / Zao dong de di guo : cong Qing di guo de pu shi zhu yi, dao Zhongguo de min zu zhu yi, yi bu 250 nian de Zhongguo dui wai guan xi shi	Westad, Odd Arne.	check					
2023-05-14	素顏的孫文 : 遊走東亞的獨裁者與職業革命家 / Su yan de sun wen : you zou dong ya de du cai zhe yu zhi ye ge ming jia	橫山宏章 = Yokoyama, Hiroaki.	check					
2023-05-14	百年追求. 卷一, 自治的夢想 臺灣民主運動的故事 / Bai nian zhui qiu. juan yi, Zi zhi de meng xiang tai wan min zhu yun dong de gu shi	陳翠蓮 / Chen, Cuilian.	check					
2023-05-14	百年追求. 卷二, 自由的挫敗 臺灣民主運動的故事 / Bai nian zhui qiu. juan er, Zi you de cuo bai tai wan min zhu yun dong de gu shi	吳乃德 / Wu, Naide.	check					
2023-05-14	百年追求. 卷三, 民主的浪潮 臺灣民主運動的故事 / Bai nian zhui qiu. juan san, Min zhu de lang chao tai wan min zhu yun dong de gu shi	胡慧玲 / Hu, Huiling.	check					
2023-05-14	中華秩序 : 中原, 世界帝國與中國力量的本質 = The China order : Centralia, world empire, and the nature of Chinese power / Zhonghua zhi xu : zhong yuan, shi jie di guo yu Zhongguo li liang de ben zhi	王飛凌 / Wang, Feiling.	check					
2023-05-14	限富扶貧 : 富裕中的貧乏 / Xian fu fu pin : fu yu zhong de pin fa	許寶強 / Xu, Baoqiang.	check					
2023-05-14	告別犬儒 : 香港自由主義的危機 / Gao bie quan ru : Xianggang zi you zhu yi de wei ji	許寶強 / Xu, Baoqiang.	check					
2023-05-14	批判式教學碰上新世代青年 : 中港台教育研究 = Critical pedagogy for the new generation : case studies in mainland China, Hong Kong and Taiwan / Pi pan shi jiao xue peng shang xin shi dai qing nian : Zhong Gang Tai jiao yu yan jiu	許寶強 / Xu, Baoqiang.	check					
2023-05-14	香港 80 年代民主運動口述歷史 / Xianggang 80 nian dai min zhu yun dong kou shu li shi	馬嶽 = Ma, Ngok. / Ma, Yue.	check					
2023-05-14	亞洲政治運動場 : 從體育看亞洲國際關係 / Ya Zhou zheng zhi yun dong chang : cong ti yu kan Ya Zhou guo ji guan xi	沈旭暉 = Shen, Simon. / Shen, Xuhui.	check					
2023-05-14	平行時空I. 立足本土的國際視野 / Ping xing shi kong I. Li zu ben tu de guo ji shi ye	沈旭暉 = Shen, Simon. / Shen, Xuhui.	check					
2023-05-14	拱心石下 : 從政十八年 / Gong xin shi xia : cong zheng shi ba nian	吳靄儀 = Ng, Oi-yee = Ng, Margaret. / Wu, Aiyi.	check					
2023-05-14	金庸小說看人生 / Jin Yong xiao shuo kan ren sheng	吳靄儀 = Ng, Oi-yee = Ng, Margaret. / Wu, Aiyi.	check					
2023-05-14	23條立法日誌 / 23 tiao li fa ri zhi	吳靄儀 = Ng, Oi-yee = Ng, Margaret. / Wu, Aiyi.	check					
2023-05-14	劍橋歸路 / Jianqiao gui lu	吳靄儀 = Ng, Oi-yee = Ng, Margaret. / Wu, Aiyi.	check					
2023-05-14	我們在一起 / Wo men zai yi qi	鄺俊宇 / Kuang, Junyu.	check					
2023-05-14	有一種幸福叫守護 / You yi zhong xing fu jiao shou hu	鄺俊宇 / Kuang, Junyu.	check					
2023-05-14	謝謝你傷過我 / Xie xie ni shang guo wo	鄺俊宇 / Kuang, Junyu.	check					
2023-05-14	我在民主黨的日子 / Wo zai min zhu dang de ri zi	劉慧卿 / Liu, Huiqing.	check					
2023-05-14	粤語學中文, 愈學愈精神 / Yue yu xue Zhong wen, yu xue yu jing shen	陳雲 / Chen, Yun.	check					
2023-05-14	危城記 / Wei cheng ji	毛孟靜 / Mao, Mengjing.	check					
2023-05-14	容身處 / Rong shen chu	吳靄儀 = Ng, Oi-yee = Ng, Margaret. / Wu, Aiyi.	check					
2023-05-14	潮池 : 浪遊二十國度的故事 / Chao chi : lang you er shi guo du de gu shi	區家麟 / Ou, Jialin.	check					
2023-05-14	他他巴 : 走在絢麗與荒涼 / Ta ta ba : zou zai xuan li yu huang liang	區家麟 / Ou, Jialin.	check					
2023-05-14	Hello World	黃照達 / Huang, Zhaoda.	check					
2023-05-14	Hello World. 2	黃照達 / Huang, Zhaoda.	check					
2023-05-14	Lonely Planet	黃照達 / Huang, Zhaoda.	check					
2023-05-14	曾特首・你會做好呢份工? / Zeng te shou, ni hui zuo hao ne fen gong?	吳志森 = Ng, Chi-sum. / Wu, Zhisen.	check					
2023-05-14	大國勃起 / Da guobo qi	曾志豪 / Zeng, Zhihao.	check					
2023-05-14	香港粵語頂硬上 / Xianggang yue yu ding ying shang	彭志銘, 鄭政恆 / Peng, Zhiming., Zheng, Zhengheng.	check					
2023-05-14	香港粵語撐到底 / Xianggang yue yu cheng dao di	彭志銘, 鄭政恆 / Peng, Zhiming., Zheng, Zhengheng.	check					
2023-05-14	正字正確 = Cantonese Orthography / Zheng zi zheng que	彭志銘 / Peng, Zhiming.	check					
2023-05-14	正字審查 / Zheng zi shen cha	彭志銘 / Peng, Zhiming.	check					
2023-05-14	廣東俗語正字考 / Guangdong su yu zheng zi kao	彭志銘 / Peng, Zhiming.	check					
2023-05-14	香港潮語話齋 / Xianggang chao yu hua zhai	彭志銘 / Peng, Zhiming.	check					
2023-05-14	粵港歇後語鈎沉 / Yue gang xie hou yu gou chen	彭志銘 / Peng, Zhiming.	check					
2023-05-14	老師怕問字 / Lao shi pa wen zi	彭志銘 / Peng, Zhiming.	check					
2023-05-14	給年輕人的十三信念 / Gei nian qing ren de shi san xin nian	彭志銘 / Peng, Zhiming.	check					
2023-05-14	選舉制度的政治效果 : 港式比例代表制的經驗 / Xuan ju zhi du de zheng zhi xiao guo : Gang shi bi li dai biao zhi de jing yan	馬嶽 = Ma, Ngok., 蔡子強 / Ma, Yue., Cai, Ziqiang.	check					
2023-05-14	世說短語300篇 / Shi shuo duan yu 300 pian	李怡 / Li, Yi.	check					
2023-05-14	通識概念攻略 / Tong shi gai nian gong lüe	許承恩 / Xu, Cheng'en.	check					
2023-05-14	同途殊歸 : 前途談判以來的香港學運 / Tong tu shu gui : qian tu tan pan yi lai de Xianggang xue yun	蔡子強等 / Cai, Ziqiang. et al.	check					
2023-05-15	通識我主場 / Tong shi wo zhu chang	庫斯克 / Kusike	check		check			
2023-05-15	反修例風暴採訪戰場 ; Fan xiu li feng bao cai fang zhan chang	42名新聞工作者 / 42 ming xin wen gong zuo zhe.	check					
2023-05-15	起看星斗 / Qi kan xing dou	司徒華 / Situ, Hua.	check					
2023-05-15	捨命陪君子 / She ming pei jun zi	司徒華 / Situ, Hua.	check					
2023-05-15	猶吐靑絲 / You tu qing si	司徒華 / Situ, Hua.	check					
2023-05-15	胸中海嶽 / Xiong zhong hai yue	司徒華 / Situ, Hua.	check					
2023-05-15	去尚纏綿 / Qu shang chan mian	司徒華 / Situ, Hua.	check					
2023-05-15	望斷天涯 / Wang duan tian ya	司徒華 / Situ, Hua.	check					
2023-05-15	夜聽春雨 / Ye ting chun yu	司徒華 / Situ, Hua.	check					
2023-05-15	滄浪之水 / Cang lang zhi shui	司徒華 / Situ, Hua.	check					
2023-05-15	江山無限 / Jiang shan wu xian	司徒華 / Situ, Hua.	check					
2023-05-15	化作春泥 / hua zuo chun ni	司徒華 / Situ, Hua.	check					
2023-05-15	山鳥山花 / Shan niao shan hua	司徒華 / Situ, Hua.	check					
2023-05-15	塵土雲月 / Chen tu yun yue	司徒華 / Situ, Hua.	check					
2023-05-15	橙黃橘綠 / Cheng huang ju lu	司徒華 / Situ, Hua.	check					
2023-05-15	弦斷誰聽 / Xian duan shui ting	司徒華 / Situ, Hua.	check					
2023-05-15	煙雨平生 / Yan yu ping sheng	司徒華 / Situ, Hua.	check					
2023-05-15	青山不老 / Qing shan bu lao	司徒華 / Situ, Hua.	check					
2023-05-15	一寸春心 / Yi cun chun xin	司徒華 / Situ, Hua.	check					
2023-05-15	竦聽荒雞 / Song ting huang ji	司徒華 / Situ, Hua.	check					
2023-05-15	回眸時看 / Hui mou shi kan	司徒華 / Situ, Hua.	check					
2023-05-15	隨風潛入夜 / Sui feng qian ru ye	司徒華 / Situ, Hua.	check					
2023-05-15	一枝清采 / Yi zhi qing cai	司徒華 / Situ, Hua.	check					
2023-05-15	俯首甘為 / Fu shou gan wei	司徒華 / Situ, Hua.	check					
2023-05-15	又綠江南 / You lu Jiang nan	司徒華 / Situ, Hua.	check					
2023-05-15	史學與傳統 / Shi xue yu chuan tong	余英時 / Yu, Yingshi.	check					
2023-05-15	士与中国文化 / Shi yu Zhongguo wen hua	余英时 / Yu, Yingshi.	check					
2023-05-15	挑戰與再生 / Tiao zhan yu zai sheng	余英時等 / Yu, Yingshi. et al.	check					
2023-05-15	那些忧伤的年轻人 = Born in the 1970s / Nei xie you shang de nian qing ren	许知远 / Xu, Zhiyuan.	check					
2023-05-15	抗爭者 / Kang zheng zhe	許知遠 / Xu, Zhiyuan.	check					
2023-05-15	中国纪事 / Zhongguo ji shi	许知远 / Xu, Zhiyuan.	check					
2023-05-15	我要成为世界的一部分 / Wo yao cheng wei shi jie de yi bu fen	许知远 / Xu, Zhiyuan.	check					
2023-05-15	这一代人的中国意识 / Zhe yi dai ren de Zhongguo yi shi	许知远 / Xu, Zhiyuan.	check					
2023-05-15	近代史的墮落 : 劉仲敬點評近現代人物. 國共卷 / Jin dai shi de duo luo : Liu zhong jing dian ping jin xian dai ren wu. Guo Gong juan	劉仲敬 / Xu, Zhiyuan.	check					
2023-05-15	廣東雅言 / Guangdong ya yan / Jin dai shi de duo luo : Liu zhong jing dian ping jin xian dai ren wu. Guo Gong juan	陳雲 / Chen, Yun.	check					
2023-05-15	保衛香港官話 / Bao wei Xianggang guan hua	陳雲 / Chen, Yun.	check					
2023-05-15	今生不做中國人 = I don't want to be Chinese / Jin sheng bu zuo Zhongguo ren	余杰 / Yu, Jie.	check					
2023-05-15	我無罪 : 劉曉波傳 / Wo wu zui : Liu Xiaobo zhuan	余杰 / Yu, Jie.	check					
2023-05-15	香港獨立 = Liberate Hong Kong, the revolution of our times / Xianggang du li	余杰 / Yu, Jie.	check					
2023-05-15	沒有抗爭哪有改變 / Mei you kang zheng na you gai bian	黃毓民 / Huang, Yumin.	check					
2023-05-15	本土, 民主, 反共 : 黃毓民政論集 / Ben tu, min zhu, fan gong : Huang Yumin zheng lun ji	黃毓民 / Huang, Yumin.	check					
2023-05-15	妖風 : 全球民主危機與反擊之道 = Ill winds : saving democracy from Russian rage, Chinese ambition, and American complacency / Yao feng : quan qiu min zhu wei ji yu fan ji zhi dao	Diamond, Larry.	check					
2023-05-13	中國, 潰而不崩 / Zhongguo, kui er bu being	何清漣, 程曉農 / He, Qinglian., Cheng, Xiaonong.	check					
2023-05-13	她們的征途 : 直擊、迂迴與衝撞, 中國女性的公民覺醒之路 / Ta men de zheng tu : zhi ji, yu hui yu chong zhuang, Zhongguo nü xing de gong min jue xing zhi lu	趙思樂 / Zhao, Sile.	check					
2023-05-13	完美的獨裁 : 二十一世紀的中國 = The perfect dictatorship : China in the 21st century / Wan mei de du cai : er shi yi shi ji de Zhongguo	Ringen, Stein.	check					
2023-05-13	中國文明の歷史 : 非漢中心史觀的建構 / Zhongguo wen ming no li shi : fei Han zhong xin shi guan de jian gou	岡田英弘 / Okada, Hidehiro.	check					
2023-05-13	重構二二八：戰後美中體制、中國統治模式與臺灣 / 重構二二八 : 戰後美中體制, 中國統治模式與臺灣 / Chong gou er er ba : zhan hou Mei Zhong ti zhi, Zhongguo tong zhi mo shi yu Taiwan	陳翠蓮 / Chen, Cuilian.	check					
2023-05-23	西藏 : 2008 / Xizang : 2008	唯色 / Weise.	check					
2023-05-23	看不見的西藏 / Kan bu jian de Xizang	唯色 / Weise.	check					
2023-05-23	聽說西藏 = Voices from Tibet / Ting shuo Xizang	唯色、王力雄 / Weise., Wang, Lixiong.	check					
2023-05-23	天葬 : 西藏的命運 = The Destiny of Tibet / Tian zang : Xizang de ming yun	王力雄 / Wang, Lixiong.	check					
2023-05-19	香港人・不高興 / Xianggang ren, bu gao xing	吳志森 = Ng, Chi-sum. / Wu, Zhisen.	check					
2023-05-19	編者按 / Bian zhe an	吳志森 = Ng, Chi-sum. / Wu, Zhisen.	check					
2023-05-19	謊言治港 : 偽語廢話謊言騙語屁話妖言 / Huang yan zhi Gang : wei yu fei hua huang yan pian yu pi hua yue yan	吳志森 = Ng, Chi-sum. / Wu, Zhisen.	check					
2023-05-19	說不出對未來的感覺 / Shuo bu chu dui wei lai de gan jue	吳志森 = Ng, Chi-sum. / Wu, Zhisen.	check					
2023-05-19	明知會輸, 我哋都一定要贏 / Ming zhi hui shu, wo die dou yi ding yao ying	吳志森 = Ng, Chi-sum. / Wu, Zhisen.	check					
2023-05-19	1720	吳志森 = Ng, Chi-sum. / Wu, Zhisen.	check					
2023-05-19	掛住太后 / Gua zhu tai hou	吳志森 = Ng, Chi-sum. / Wu, Zhisen.	check					
2023-05-19	這一天, 終於來了 / Zhe yi tian, zhong yu lai le	吳志森 = Ng, Chi-sum. / Wu, Zhisen.	check					
2023-05-19	天佑香港 / Tian you Xianggang	吳志森 = Ng, Chi-sum. / Wu, Zhisen.	check					
2023-05-19	花開花落兩由之 : 雨傘・時局 / Hua kai hua luo liang you zhi : yu san, shi ju	黃天任 / Huang, Tianren.	check					
2023-05-19	畸變・中港和合的軌跡 / Ji bian, Zhong Gang he de gui ji	李怡 / Li, Yi.	check					
2023-05-19	放逐 : 愛國愛港的懸念 / Fang zhu : Ai guo ai Gang de xuan nian	李怡 / Li, Yi.	check					
2023-05-19	世道人生之往事近事 / Shi dao ren sheng zhi wang shi jin shi	李怡 / Li, Yi.	check					
2023-05-19	最壞的時代, 最好的時代 / Zui huai de shi dai, zui hao de shi dai	李怡 / Li, Yi.	check					
2023-05-19	李怡語粹 : 走過悲觀而積極的人生 / Li Yi yu cui : zou guo bei guan er ji ji de ren sheng	李怡 / Li, Yi.	check					
2023-05-19	知識分子與中國 / Zhi shi fen zi yu Zhongguo	李怡 / Li, Yi.	check					
2023-05-19	批判香港 = Critique of Hong Kong / Pi pan Xianggang	黃盛 / Huang, Sheng.	check					
2023-05-19	本是老土 = Oldcalism : Made in Hong Kong / Ben shi lao tu	黃琛喻 / Huang, Chenyu.	check					
2023-05-19	政海觀瀾 : 六四後的香港政爭 / Zheng hai guan lan : liu si hou de Xianggang zheng zheng	高繼標 / Gao, Jibiao.	check					
2023-05-19	袋巾背後 : 2007特首選戰140天 / Dai jin bei hou : 2007 te shou xuan zhan 140 tian	梁家傑 = Leong, Kah-kit Alan. / Liang, Jiajie.	check					
2023-05-19	香港政治參與新型態 / Xianggang zheng zhi can yu xin xing tai	鄭宇碩 / Zheng, Yushuo.	check					
2023-05-19	假如我不是余若薇 / If I were not Yu Ruowei	余若薇 / Yu, Ruowei.	check					
2023-05-19	抽乾香港 / Chou gan Xianggang	曾志豪 / Zeng, Zhihao.	check					
2023-05-19	2017普選中共的大戰略 : 梁振英上台及黨人治港 / 2017 pu xuan zhong gong de da zhan lüe : Liang Zhenying shang tai ji dang ren zhi Gang	周顯 / Zhou, Xian.	check					
2023-05-19	梁振英出任行政長官的前因後果 : 中國共產黨收回香港的70年大戰略 (1977–2047) / Liang Zhenying chu ren xing zheng zhang guan de qian yin hou guo : Zhongguo gong chan dang shou hui Xianggang de 70 nian da zhan lüe (1977–2047)	周顯 / Zhou, Xian.	check					
2023-05-19	偏向虎山行 / Pian xiang hu shan xing	劉慧卿 / Liu, Huiqing.	check					
2023-05-19	香港無得救 / Xianggang wu de jiu	呂志華 / Lü, Zhihua.	check					
2023-05-19	港式法團主義 : 功能界別25年 = Corporatism in Hong Kong : 25 years of functional constituencies / Gang shi fa tuan zhu yi : gong neng jie bie 25 nian	馬嶽 = Ma, Ngok. / Ma, Yue.	check					
2023-05-19 & 2023-04-29	香港思潮：本土意識的興起與爭議 / Xiang gang si chao : ben tu yi shi de xing qi yu zheng yi	李怡, 林玉儀 / Li, Yi., Lin, Yuyi.	check					
2023-05-28	致富活着 : 非凡的獨門實戰寶典 / Zhi fu huo zhe : fei fan de du men shi zhan bao dian	錢志健 / Qian, Zhijian.					check	
2023-05-28	致富活着. II, 對沖策略王 : 順勢而行, 無量境界 : 非凡的獨門實戰寶典 / Zhi fu huo zhe. II, Dui chong ce lüe wang : shun shi er xing, wu liang jing jie : fei fan de du men shi zhan bao dian	錢志健 / Qian, Zhijian.					check	
2023-05-28	致富活着. III, 從十萬到過億, 好股票是王道 / Zhi fu huo zhe. II, cong shi wan dao guo yi, hao gu piao shi wang dao	柳廣成 / Liu, Guangcheng.					check	
2023-05-28	被消失的香港被消失的香港 = The fallen city : Hong Kong / Bei xiao shi de Xianggang	錢志健 / Qian, Zhijian.					check	
2023-05-28	台灣歴史一本通 = Taiwan history / Taiwan li shi yi ben tong	黃淑鈴 / Huang, Shuling.					check	
2023-05-28	朱薰e潮語新聞字 / Zhu Xun e chao yu xin wen zi	朱薰 / Zhu, Xun.					check	
2023-05-28	六四二〇 / Liu si er ling	陳潤芝 / Chen, Runzhi.	check					
2023-05-28	執正中文 : 對治壞鬼公文學好中文章法 / Zhi zheng Zhong wen : dui zhi huai gui gong wen xue hao Zhong wen zhang fa	陳雲 / Chen, Yun.	check					
2023-05-28	從柏林圍牆到天安門 : 從德國看中國的現代化之路 = From Berlinwall to Tiananmen / Cong Bolin wei qiang dao Tian'an Men : cong Deguo kan Zhongguo de xian dai hua zhi lu	余杰 / Yu, Jie.	check					
2023-05-28	鍍金中國 : 大國雄起的虛與實 / Du jin Zhongguo : da guo xiong qi de xu yu shi	許知遠 / Xu, Zhiyuan.	check					
2023-06-13	我的西域, 你的東土 = My West land, your East country / Wo de Xiyu, ni de dong tu	王力雄 / Wang, Lixiong.					check	
2023-06-13	失治之城 : 掙扎求存的香港 = A city mismanaged : Hong Kong's struggle for survival / Shi zhi zhi cheng : zheng zha qiu cun de Xianggang	顧汝德 / Goodstadt, Leo F.					check	
2023-06-13	未竟的快樂時代 : 香港民主回歸世代精神史 = Neverland never more : the intellectual history of Hong Kong's "Democratic Reunion" generation / Wei jing de kuai le shi dai : Xianggang min zhu hui gui shi dai jing shen shi	徐承恩 = Tsui, Sing Yan Eric. / Xu, Cheng'en.					check	
2023-06-13	香港日記 = The Hong Kong diaries / Xianggang ri ji	彭定康 / Patten, Chris.					check	
2023-04-29	中共崛起 : 亞洲的和戰難局 = China's coming war with Asia / Zhong gong jue qi : Ya Zhou de he zhan nan ju	強納森．霍斯雷格 / Holslag, Jonathan.					check	
2023-04-29	中國霸權的論理與現實 / Zhongguo ba quan de lun li yu xian shi	中西輝政 / Nakanishi, Terumasa.					check	
2023-04-29	七月十四, 我在旺角火都嚟!!! / Qi yue shi si, wo zai Wangjiao huo dou li!!!	林慧思 / Lin, Huisi.					check	
2023-04-29	酒神的抗爭 : 絶望香港的哲學出路 / Jiu shen de kang zheng : jue wang Xianggang de zhe xue chu lu	黃國鉅 / Huang, Guoju.					check	
2023-04-29	香港宿命與台灣 / Xianggang su ming yu Taiwan	廖建龍 / Liao, Jianlong.					check	
2023-04-29	獨立之精神 : 自由之思想 / Du li zhi jing shen : zi you zhi si xiang	李怡 / Li, Yi.					check	
2023-04-29	新・台灣的主張 / Xin, Taiwan de zhu zhang	李登輝 = Lee, Teng-hui. / Li, Denghui.					check	
2023-04-29	專治政無能之起你個錨 / Zhuan zhi zheng wu neng zhi qi ni ge mao	毛小璐 / Mao, Xiaolu.					check	
2023-10-13	香港遊 = A tour of Hong Kong / Xianggang you	孫心瑜 / Sun, Xinyu.	check					
2023-10-13	北京遊 = A tour of Beijing / Beijing you	孫心瑜 / Sun, Xinyu.	check					
2023-02-28	Tiananmen exiles : voices of the struggle for democracy in China	He, Xiaoqing Rowena.	check				check	
2022-09-02	香港祕密行動 = Clandestine in Hong Kong : the unfinished journey of the valiant / Xianggang mi mi xing dong	楊威利修 = Yeung, Willie Sau. / Yang, Weili Xiu.					check	
2024-01-19	鬼故散打 : 50篇懸疑靈異個案解密 / Gui gu san da : 50 pian xuan yi ling yi ge an jie mi	雲海 / Yun hai.					check	
2024-01-19	靈異月桂 : 異境謎途小品超短篇 / Ling yi yue gui : yi jing mi tu xiao pin chao duan pian	雲海 / Yun hai.					check	
2024-04-22	中國知識分子淪亡史 : 在功名和自由之間的掙扎與抗爭 / Zhongguo zhi shi fen zi lun wang shi : zai gong ming he zi you zhi jian de zheng zha yu kang zheng	周非 / Zhou, Fei.		check				
2024-04-22	中共祕密檔案 / Zhong gong mi mi dang an	李明 / Li, Ming.		check				
2024-04-22	太子黨盟主之戰 / Tai zi dang meng zhu zhi zhan	南邡龍 / Nan, Fanglong.		check				
2024-04-22	胡溫風險, 2005 / Hu Wen feng xian, 2005	揚善 / Yang, Shan.		check				
2024-04-22	金權太子黨 / Jin quan tai zi dang	孟君 / Meng, Jun.		check				
2024-04-22	餐桌上的中共領袖 = CCP leaders on dinner table / Can zhuo shang de Zhong gong ling xiu	權延赤 / Quan, Yanchi.		check				
2024-04-22	毛澤東和他的女人們 / Mao Zedong he ta de nu ren men	京夫子 / Jingfuzi.		check				
2024-07-19	走着瞧. 貳 = Snapshots across Hong Kong. II / Zou zhu qiao. Er = Snapshots across Hong Kong. II	姜建 / Jiang, Jian.					check	
2024-07-19	異鄉港孩 : 願歸來仍是少年 : 30個移民家庭的教養歷險記 / Yi xiang Gang hai : yuan gui lai reng shi shao nian : 30 ge yi min jia ting de jiao yang li xian ji	希望學編輯團隊 / Xie Aoshuang Xi wang xue bian ji tuan dui					check	
2024-07-19	末日練習 : 廖偉棠短篇小說集 / Mo ri lian xi : Liao Weitang duan pian xiao shuo ji	廖偉棠 / Liao, Weitang.					check	
2024-07-19	最後的信仰 : 新聞倫理十二講 / Zui hou de xin yang : xin wen lun li shi er jiang	區家麟 / Ou, Jialin.					check	
2024-07-20	亂流 : 浪花水滴的搏鬥 / Luan liu : lang hua shui di de bo dou	區家麟 / Ou, Jialin.					check	
2024-07-20	二千零四十七夜 / Er qian ling si shi qi ye	區家麟 / Ou, Jialin.					check	
2024-07-20	坐監情緒學 / Zuo jian qing xu xue	邵家臻 / Shao, Jiazhen.					check	
2024-07-20	字裡囚間 : 明就明, 唔明就黎明 / Zi li qiu jian : ming jiu ming, wu ming jiu li ming	邵家臻 / Shao, Jiazhen.					check	
2024-07-20	日常運動 / Ri chang yun dong	梁莉姿 / Liang, Lizi.					check	
2024-07-31	弟弟 / Di di	陳慧 / Chen, Hui.				check		
2024-07-31	敲鐘者言 : 朱耀明牧師回憶錄 / Qiao zhong zhe yan: Zhu Yaoming mu shi hui yi lu	朱耀明 / Zhu, Yaoming.				check		
2024-08-24	香港是我家. 單元一, 香港是何地 / Xiang gang shi wo jia. dan yuan yi, Xianggang shi he di	思故鄉港教材企劃團隊 / Si gu xiang gang jiao cai qi hua tuan dui		check				
2024-09-02	雨中的香港 / Yu zhong de Xianggang	吳靄儀 = Ng, Oi-yee = Ng, Margaret. / Wu, Aiyi.					check	
2025-07-21	香港我的愛與痛 / Xianggang wo de ai yu tong	顏純鈎 / Yan, Chungou.					check	
2025-07-25	獄外之囚 / Yu wai zhi qiu	邵家臻 / Shao, Jiazhen.					check	
2025-07-25	留下 = Stay here / Liu xia	劉慧卿 / Liu, Huiqing.					check	
2026-03-24	黎智英傳 : 從億萬富翁, 到中國最懼怕的批評者 = The Troublemaker: How Jimmy Lai Became a Billionaire, Hong Kong's Greatest Dissident, and China's Most Feared Critic	祁福德 / Clifford, Mark L..	Booksellers arrested					
2026-07-13	留下，留下…… / Liu xia, liu xia……	楊健興 / Yang, Jianxing.					check	
2026-07-13	崢嶸歲月 / Zheng rong sui yue	曾鈺成 / Zeng, Yucheng.	Rejected for printing by Chung Hwa Book Company (Hong Kong) Limited					
2026-07-15	唯紅花綻放：習近平時代的認同與歸屬 / Let only red flowers bloom: identity and belonging in Xi Jinping’s China	馮哲芸 / Feng, Emily.	Booksellers arrested					
2026-07-20	不來也不去 / Bu lai ye bu qu	林夕 / Lin, Xi.					Removed by the publisher during the Hong Kong Book Fair	
2026-07-21	賣書者言 = Where books and lives meet / Mai shu zhe yan	陳璇等 / Chen, Xuan., et al.					Banned from sale at the Hong Kong Book Fair by the HKTDC	
2026-07-21	編輯人說 = Monologues from the editorial desk / Bian ji ren shuo	張小鳴等 / Zhang, Xiaomíng., et al.					Banned from sale at the Hong Kong Book Fair by the HKTDC	
2026-07-21	無憂花 / Wu you hua	鄧小樺 / Deng, Xiaohua.					Banned from sale at the Hong Kong Book Fair by the HKTDC	
2026-07-21	今天 = Today = Jintian / Jin tian	北島 (編輯) / Beidao (Editor)					Banned from sale at the Hong Kong Book Fair by the HKTDC	
2026-07-23	在加多利山尋找張愛玲 / Zai Jiaduoli Shan xun zhao Zhang Ailing	馮睎乾 / Feng, Xiqian.	Banned in mainland China and Hong Kong					

== See also ==
- Causeway Bay Books disappearances
- 2020 Hong Kong national security law
- Book censorship
- Lists of banned books
- List of books banned by governments
- Censorship in Hong Kong
- Internet censorship in Hong Kong
