= Greenfield Bookstore =

Independent book store in Hong Kong

- Founded: 1976; 50 years ago
- Founder: Wong Seung-wai (黃尚偉)
- Defunct: July 31, 2026
- Headquarters: 46 Sai Yeung Choi Street, Mong Kok, Hong Kong

Greenfield Bookstore (Chinese: 田園書屋) was an independent bookstore in Hong Kong. Founded in 1976, it operated in Mong Kok for five decades. It announced its closure in July 2026, following the arrest of two employees.

== History ==
Greenfield Bookstore was established in 1976 by Wong Sheung-wai (黃尚偉), a Hongkonger, after graduating from National Taiwan University. Located on Sai Yeung Choi Street in Mong Kok, it was the first bookstore in the area that would later became known for its concentration of upstairs bookstores. Other bookstores in the area included Hong Kong Reader Bookstore, Boundary Bookstore and Have A Nice Stay. The bookstore occupied a premises of approximately 600 square feet and housed tens of thousands of books. It also developed publishing and book-distribution operations.

Greenfield became particularly associated with books on Chinese history, politics, literature and philosophy, as well as translated works published in Taiwan. In the 1990s, it expanded its selection of books concerning politically sensitive subjects in China. In 1994, the bookstore imported 300,000 copies of The Private Life of Chairman Mao, the memoir of Mao Zedong's physician Li Zhisui, and they sold out. From then, Greenfield began importing and self-publishing politically sensitive books. In 2009, it collaborated with Bao Pu, the son of the former secretary of Zhao Ziyang, and sold Bao's publication Prisoner of the State: The Secret Journal of Premier Zhao Ziyang at the Hong Kong Book Fair.

Lam Wing-kee, the late founder of Causeway Bay Books, also worked at Greenfield Bookstore in the past.

=== Arrests ===
On 15 July 2026, Greenfield Bookstore and fellow independent bookstore Have a Nice Stay were raided by Hong Kong Police on grounds of national security. Two Greenfield Bookstore employees were arrested for allegedly displaying seditious materials and selling seditious publications.

After the raid, Greenfield Bookstore announced on social media on 29 July at 2 a.m. that it would close once its lease expires.

== See also ==
- Book censorship in Hong Kong
