= Have A Nice Stay =

Independent bookstore in Hong Kong

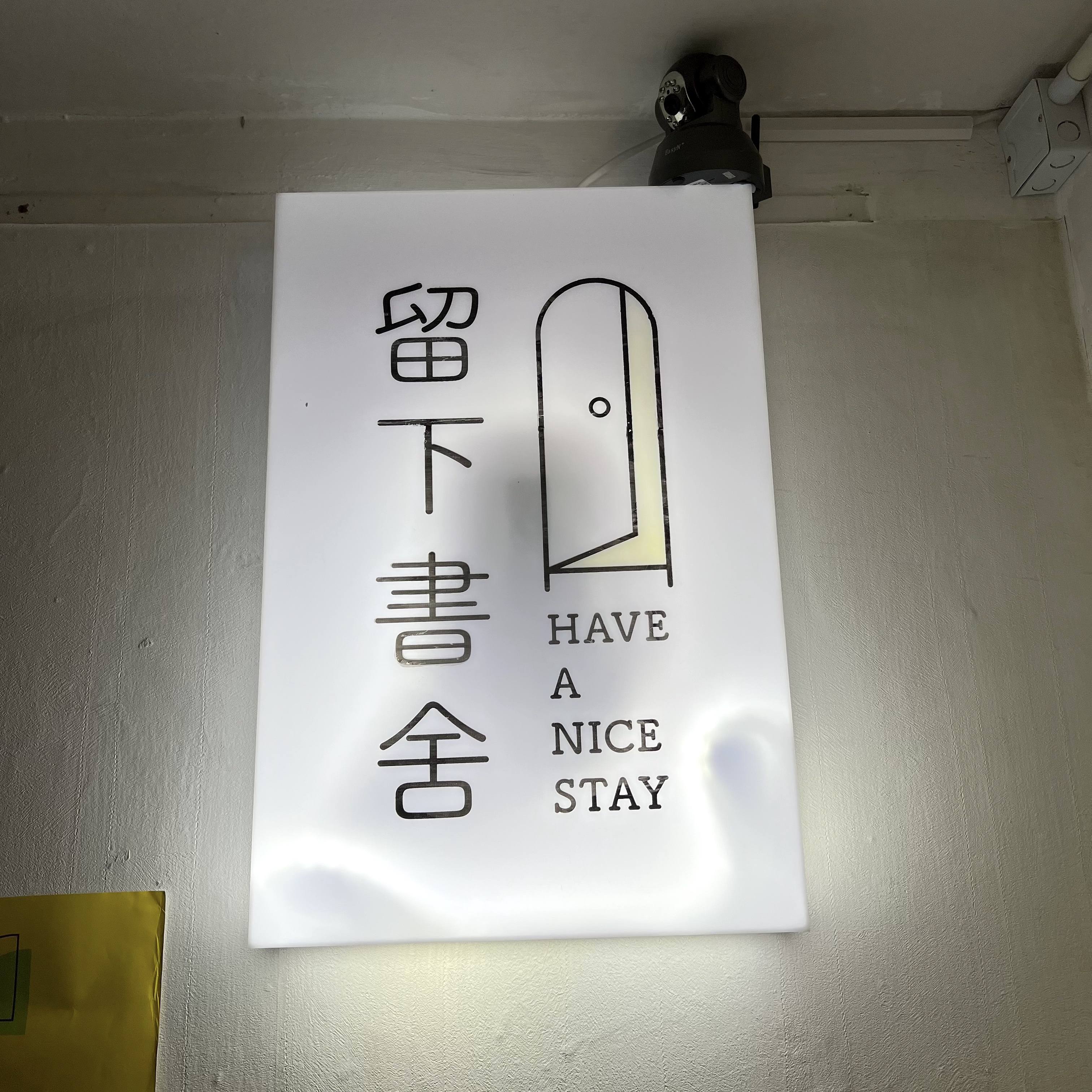

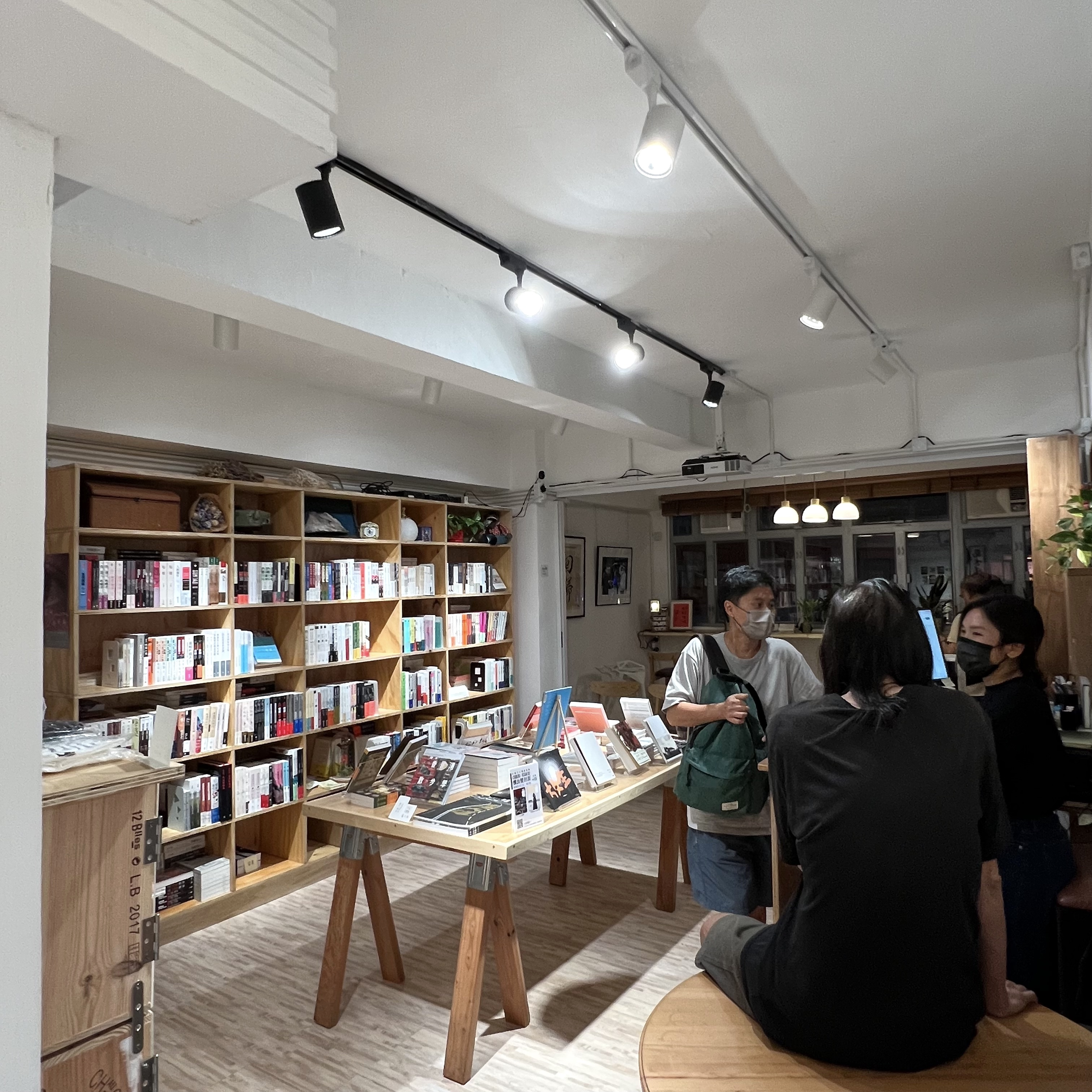
- Interior in August 2022
- Founded: May 25, 2022; 4 years ago
- Headquarters: 4/F, 228 Sai Yeung Choi Street South, Hong Kong

Have A Nice Stay (Chinese: 留下書舍) is an independent bookstore in Prince Edward, Hong Kong. Founded by five former journalists, the bookstore sought to provide a space for "those who remain" (Note: Chinese 留下來的人, lit. 'people who stayed'. The term describes Hongkongers who didn't emigrate despite the 2019 anti-ELAB movement.) to rest and gather, while promoting journalism knowledge and media literacy through its book selection. However, following the police raid and arrest, the store announced it would close on 30 August 2026, citing Hong Kong's social environment, its financial situation and "the elusive red line."

== History ==
=== Origins ===
The five founders were all former journalists who lost their jobs after the media outlets they worked for shut down following the passage of Hong Kong national security law. They considered whether to leave Hong Kong, but uncertainty about employment overseas, combined with their attachment to the city, led them to embrace the idea of "staying." According to co-founder Kris, Hong Kong needed a place for media workers to rest after work and share their thoughts. He also believed that many Hongkongers shared the desire to "provide a place for those who remain." They chose Prince Edward for its convenient transport links, which could attract visitors from across the city.

For this reason, the five founders invested HK$100,000 to open the bookstore. During the site-selection process, they searched Land Registry records and other sources to understand the ownership and future development plans of prospective buildings. However, as former journalists, they had little experience with electrical work or carpentry. Online tutorials proved little help, so former classmates and journalist colleagues stepped in to assist with moving and renovations, which deeply moved the founders. They also visited independent bookstores to learn about different approaches to running a bookstore. After months of preparation, the bookstore officially opened on 25 May 2022.

According to the founders, they initially wanted a name related to "news" or "documentation," reflecting the bookstore’s focus. However, adding "bookstore" to such a name felt awkward. One evening, they began reflecting on the question, "What is a journalist’s responsibility?" This led them to the word "stay" or "leave something behind" (留下). The words "書舍" (syu1 se3) also sound similar in Cantonese to "書寫" (syu1 se2), meaning "to write." Combining the two gave the bookstore its name, "留下書舍".

=== July 2026 police raid ===
On 15 July 2026, the store, along with fellow independent bookstore Greenfield Book Store were raided by Hong Kong Police on national security grounds. Five people were arrested on suspicion of selling allegedly seditious publications. The raid occurred on the first day of the 2026 Hong Kong Book Fair, a government-organized event that has barred independent bookstores from participating.

Following the raid, Have a Nice Stay closed ahead of schedule.

==== Reaction ====
Hong Kong's Secretary for Security Chris Tang subsequently told lawmakers that "If you are a bookseller, you have the responsibility to make sure the books you sell won't endanger national security."

Amnesty International wrote, "This year's escalating attacks on Hong Kong's independent bookstores hammer home the chilling reality of what the city has become: a place where you can be criminalized simply for what's on your bookshelf."

The slogan "I am a bookstore employee" subsequently went viral on social media in Taiwan. Taiwan's president Lai Ching-Te wrote on Facebook, "Ideas and words should never be silenced by political pressure".

== See also ==
- Book censorship in Hong Kong
