= Fundamental physical constant =

Fundamental physical constant may refer to:

- A dimensionless physical constant, one that is independent of the system of units used
- A physical constant that is a member of a set of universal constants containing the minimum number of such constants needed to define a physical theory
