= Fundamental Articles =

Fundamental Articles may refer to:

- Fundamental articles (theology), a concept in Protestant theology
- Fundamental Articles of 1871, proposed constitutional reform in Austria-Hungary concerning Bohemia
