= Fundamental law =

Fundamental law(s) may refer to:

- Organic law, in particular,
  - Constitution, in particular,
    - The Russian Constitution of 1906
    - The German Grundgesetz (more commonly translated as "Basic Law")
    - The four individual laws that together make up the Constitution of Sweden
    - The Fundamental Laws of England
    - The Fundamental Law of Vatican City State
    - The Fundamental Law of Hungary
  - The Basic Laws of a country that does not use the term "constitution" or has an uncodified constitution
- Any of the fundamental physical laws of the universe
- In Abrahmic religions, The Ten Commandments
