= Fundamental matrix =

Fundamental matrix may refer to:

- Fundamental matrix (computer vision)
- Fundamental matrix (linear differential equation)
- Fundamental matrix (absorbing Markov chain)
