= Basic law =

Codified constitution or a law given to have such powers and effect

A basic law is a law designed to have the effect of a constitution, but is not named as one to indicate its provisional or inferior status. The term basic law is used in some places as an alternative to "constitution" and may be intended as a temporary but necessary measure, until the formal enactment of a constitution. "Basic law" is sometimes used to avoid it being taken to be, like a constitution, "the highest law". There may be various reasons, such as religion, for this.

== Germany ==
In West Germany the term "Basic Law" (German: Grundgesetz) was used to indicate that the Basic Law was provisional until the ultimate reunification of Germany. However, when Germany finally reunified in 1990, no new constitutions were adopted and instead the Basic Law was adopted throughout the entire German territory.

== Hong Kong and Macau ==
The Special Administrative Regions of the People's Republic of China, namely Hong Kong and Macau, have basic laws as their constitutional documents. The basic laws are the highest authority, respectively, in the territories, while the rights of amendment and interpretation rest with the Standing Committee of the National People's Congress of the People's Republic of China.

== Israel ==
The Basic Laws of Israel are fourteen quasi-constitutional laws of the State of Israel, were originally intended to be draft chapters of a future Israeli constitution, which has been indefinitely postponed since 1950.

== Saudi Arabia ==
Promulgated in 1992, the Basic Law of Saudi Arabia has nine chapters, consisting of 83 articles without a separate preamble. While the Saudi king exercises sovereign authority, the constitutional principles are explicitly tied to Islamic theology and Sharia law. Following the issuance of the basic law, an advisory consultative council was established in 1993.

== List of basic laws ==
- Basic Law for the Federal Republic of Germany
- Basic Law of Saudi Arabia
- Basic Law, Fundamental Law or Constitution of Hungary
- Basic Laws of Israel
- Basic Laws of Sweden
- Basic Statute of Oman
- Hong Kong Basic Law
- Macao Basic Law
- Constitution of the Philippines
  - Philippine Bangsamoro Organic Law (sometimes called the Bangsamoro Basic Law); basic law of the Bangsomoro Autonomous Region in Muslim Mindanao
- Constitution of the Ottoman Empire, also called as the Basic Law (Ottoman Turkish: قانون أساسي, romanized: Kānûn-ı Esâsî)

== See also ==
- Constitution
- Rule according to higher law
- Fundamental law (disambiguation)
