= Fei-Ling Wang =

Fei-Ling Wang (Chinese: 王飞凌; born December 6, 1959) is a Chinese-American political scientist. He is currently a professor at the Sam Nunn School of International Affairs at the Georgia Institute of Technology. His research primarily focuses on international political economy, East Asian studies, and the politics of China.

== Life ==
Wang was born in Anhui, China, in 1959. Following the restoration of the National College Entrance Examination, he attended Anhui Normal University. He later earned a master’s degree from the University of International Relations in Beijing. In the late 1980s, Wang moved to the United States to continue his studies. He earned his PhD in political science from the University of Pennsylvania in 1992.

Wang began his teaching career as an instructor at the United States Military Academy. In 1993, he joined the faculty of the Sam Nunn School of International Affairs at the Georgia Institute of Technology as an assistant professor. He was promoted to associate professor in 1999 and has served as a full professor since 2005. His academic work is noted for its analysis of China’s socio-political systems, including the hukou (household registration) system and China's role in the international order.

On July 25, 2004, while on a visit to China, Wang was secretly detained by Chinese authorities on suspicion of "stealing state secrets." His disappearance became a diplomatic issue when his family contacted the U.S. Consulate in Shanghai on July 30 after he failed to return home as scheduled.

The U.S. State Department filed a formal protest, accusing China of violating the U.S.-China Consular Convention, which requires notification of the arrest of a U.S. citizen within four days. During his detention, Wang reported being held in solitary confinement for four days and subjected to sleep and water deprivation. Following significant diplomatic pressure, Wang was released on August 8, 2004, and allowed to return to the United States.

== Selected bibliography ==
- From Family to Market: Labor Allocation in Contemporary China (Rowman & Littlefield, 1998).
- Organization through Division and Exclusion: China’s Hukou System (Stanford University Press, 2005).
- The China Order: Centralia, World Empire, and the Nature of Chinese Power (SUNY Press, 2017). The Chinese version of the book is banned in China.
- The China Record: An Assessment of the People’s Republic (SUNY Press, 2023).
- The China Race: The Global Competition for the World Order (SUNY Press, 2024).
