= Fundamental parallelogram =

Fundamental parallelogram may mean:

- Fundamental pair of periods on the complex plane
- Primitive cell on the Euclidean plane
