= Fundamental plane =

The fundamental plane may refer to:

- Fundamental plane (spherical coordinates), which divides a spherical coordinate system
- Fundamental plane (elliptical galaxies), which shows an empirical relationship among mean surface brightness, velocity dispersion and effective radius of an elliptical galaxy
