= Fundamental constant =

In physics, the term fundamental constant may refer to:

- Any physical constant which is part of an equation that expresses a fundamental physical law
- One of the fundamental dimensionless physical constants
