= 2020 Hong Kong national security law =

Law of the People's Republic of China on Safeguarding National Security in the Hong Kong Special Administrative Region

Standing Committee of the National People's Congress
- Territorial extent: Worldwide (see Extraterritoriality)
- Passed by: Standing Committee of the National People's Congress
- Passed: 30 June 2020
- Signed by: President Xi Jinping
- Signed: 30 June 2020
- Commenced: 30 June 2020
- Effective: 30 June 2020

Legislative history
- Introduced by: Council of Chairpersons
- First reading: 18–20 June 2020
- Second reading: 28–30 June 2020
- Voting summary: 162 voted for; None voted against; None abstained
- Status: In force

2020 Hong Kong national security law
- Traditional Chinese: 香港國家安全法
- Simplified Chinese: 香港国家安全法
Transcriptions
Standard Mandarin
- Hanyu Pinyin: Xiānggǎng guójiā ānquán fǎ
- Wade–Giles: Hsiang^{1}-kang^{2} kuo^{2}-chia^{1} an^{1}-chʻüan^{2} fa^{3}
Yue: Cantonese
- Jyutping: Hoeng1 gong2 gwok3 gaa1 on1 cyun4 faat3

Law of the People's Republic of China on Safeguarding National Security in the Hong Kong Special Administrative Region
- Traditional Chinese: 中華人民共和國香港特別行政區維護國家安全法
- Simplified Chinese: 中华人民共和国香港特别行政区维护国家安全法
Transcriptions
Standard Mandarin
- Hanyu Pinyin: Zhōnghuá rénmín gònghéguó xiānggǎng tèbié xíngzhèngqū wéihù guójiā ānquán fǎ
- Wade–Giles: Chung^{1}-hua^{2} jên^{2}-min^{2} kung^{4}-ho^{2}-kuo^{2} hsiang^{1}-kang^{2} tʻê^{4}-pieh^{2} hsing^{2}-cheng^{4}-chü^{1} wei^{2}-hu^{4} kuo^{2}-chia^{1} an^{1}-chʻüan^{2} fa^{3}
Yue: Cantonese
- Jyutping: Zung1 waa4 jan4 man4 gung6 wo4 gwok3 Hoeng1 gong2 Dak6 bit6 hang4 zing3 keoi1 wai4 wu6 gwok3 gaa1 on1 cyun4 faat3

The Law of the People's Republic of China on Safeguarding National Security in the Hong Kong Special Administrative Region is a national law of China on Hong Kong national security passed on 30 June 2020. It is implemented in Hong Kong in accordance with Hong Kong Basic Law Article 18, which allows for China's national laws to be valid in Hong Kong if they are included in Annex III. It was formulated under the authorization of the National People's Congress decision on Hong Kong national security legislation. The law was passed on 30 June 2020 by the Standing Committee of the National People's Congress as a means of resolving the anti-extradition bill protests instigated by a Hong Kong local bill proposed in 2019 to enable extradition to other territories including the mainland. The law came into force on the same day it was passed.

Among others, the national security law established four particular crimes of secession, subversion, terrorism, and collusion with foreign organisations; any open speech, verbal promotion or intention of Hong Kong's secession from China is considered a crime as well. The implementation of the law entitles authorities to surveil, detain, and search persons suspected under its provisions and to require publishers, hosting services, and internet service providers to block, remove, or restrict content which the authorities determine to be in violation thereof. The law established the Office for Safeguarding National Security outside of Hong Kong jurisdiction to administer enforcement of the law.

Article 23 of the Hong Kong Basic Law, which came into force with the British handover of Hong Kong in 1997, required that a national security law with some of these provisions be enacted by the Hong Kong Special Administrative Region. Before the 2019–2020 protests and passage of the law, a 2003 attempt by the Hong Kong Legislative Council to satisfy Article 23 failed after mass demonstrations. Both the 2003 attempt at and the 2020 passage of legislation occurred during outbreaks of a novel coronavirus (SARS and COVID-19, respectively), which affected the actions of both protesters and authorities. Article 23 was implemented in March 2024 with the enactment of the Safeguarding National Security Ordinance.

The United Kingdom and 26 other countries condemned the national security law; the United Kingdom called it a breach of the 1984 Sino-British Joint Declaration, which provided autonomy for Hong Kong to be retained for 50 years. Following the imposition of the national security law, countries such as Australia, Canada, the United Kingdom, and the United States introduced relaxed immigration policies for migrants from Hong Kong. Article 38 of the law has drawn significant attention due to stating that it is applicable to those who are neither permanent residents nor residents of Hong Kong. This provision has been interpreted by some as saying that it is applicable to every individual in the world.

== Background ==
Article 23 of Hong Kong's Basic Law states that Hong Kong Special Administrative Region will "enact laws on its own" for the Region's security and to prevent political bodies outside the Region from "conducting political activities in the Region" or otherwise interfering with Hong Kong's independent security:

The Hong Kong Special Administrative Region shall enact laws on its own to prohibit any act of treason, secession, sedition, subversion against the Central People's Government, or theft of state secrets, to prohibit foreign political organisations or bodies from conducting political activities in the Region, and to prohibit political organisations or bodies of the Region from establishing ties with foreign political organisations or bodies.

A national security law would relate to three ordinances that make up Hong Kong's penal law, the Official Secrets Ordinance, Crimes Ordinance and Societies Ordinance. The Societies Ordinance in particular covers elements of security, as it was intended to prevent the creation of criminal secret societies and triads. In 1949, with the influx of migrants from China, it was reintroduced and amended to specifically mention "foreign political organisations". The Crimes Ordinance covers the handling of dissent within the region. In place since 1971, and never amended, the ordinance sets a legal standard allowing people to be imprisoned simply for handling material deemed to be against the government, without need for evidence.

The Hong Kong Bill of Rights ensures freedom of speech, but Hong Kong barrister Wilson Leung has said that China may find a way to override this in legislation they introduce. Leung cites the fact a law imposed by China would be considered national law – while the Hong Kong Bill of Rights is "local" and so would be deemed subordinate by Beijing – and that the Standing Committee of the National People's Congress (NPCSC) is the highest authority on interpreting the Basic Law, and so could "say that the new security law cannot be restrained by the Bill of Rights" if they want.

National security legislation in mainland China is controversial outside the country. First implemented in 1993, China's national security law became more restrictive under Chinese Communist Party general secretary Xi Jinping, who set up a National Security Commission (that he heads himself) shortly after he came to power.

== Past legislation attempts ==
=== 1992–1997 ===
==== Societies Ordinance ====
After the 1989 Tiananmen Square protests and massacre, with Hong Kong residents concerned over their civil liberties, the Societies Ordinance was reviewed; it was amended in 1992, relaxing some of the restrictions against being able to register some societies, but this was repealed after the handover in 1997. According to the Hong Kong Human Rights Monitor (HRM), China amended the ordinance in 1997 "as part of a package of China's effort to emasculate the Hong Kong Bill of Rights". The 1997 amendments include the proviso that should the relevant officials "reasonably believe" that prohibiting a society "is necessary in the interests of national security or public safety, public order (ordre public) or the protection of the rights and freedoms of others", it can be banned without evidence. HRM said that:

The use of the term "national security" is particularly objectionable because the concept has frequently been used in China to criminalise the peaceful exercise of the rights of expression and to persecute those with legitimate demands like democracy and human rights. Its inclusion raises fears of extension of such Mainland Chinese practices to Hong Kong especially in the light of Article 23 of the Basic Law.

— 1997–98 Memorandum submitted by the Hong Kong Human Rights Monitor, Appendix 5, paragraph 136

The international response to this 'national security law' was to invoke the Siracusa Principles, which say that national security "cannot be invoked as a reason for imposing limitations to prevent merely local or relatively isolated threats to law and order", only against outside threats. International jurists declared that including 'national security' in the ordinance dealing with local societies was unwarranted and inappropriate because "it is difficult to suggest that a society or a demonstration in Hong Kong will threaten the existence of China", and any local threat can be handled with normal public order laws. Despite this, the 'national security' ground was introduced. While "national security" was defined as "safeguarding of the territorial integrity and the independence of the People's Republic of China", there was no explanation of what constituted a threat to this, nor how it should be implemented.

==== Crimes Ordinance ====
In December 1996, the Hong Kong Legislative Council (as part of the British colonial government) introduced the Crimes (Amendment)(No.2) Bill 1996. The catalyst for introduction was the forthcoming handover, with the initial amendments being mostly technical and removing reference to the monarchy. In turn, it sought proposals to change the articles on treasonable offences. This bill would have amended the Crimes Ordinance, changing sedition legislation that had existed since 1971 and was described by Hong Kong as "archaic". Specifically, the bill proposed legalising dissent of the government, with the council declaring that the existing ordinance "[was] contrary to the development of democracy [as it] criminalises speech or writing and may be used as a weapon against legitimate criticism of the government". The bill failed as it was strongly opposed by Beijing, leaving a gap in national security legislation.

A "scaled-down" version of the Crimes Ordinance amendment was pushed through. It gave a more limited definition of "sedition" and increased territorial defences; it was signed by Hong Kong Governor Chris Patten days before the 1997 handover, but was quickly discarded by the Chinese before it could ever come into effect.

=== 2003 ===
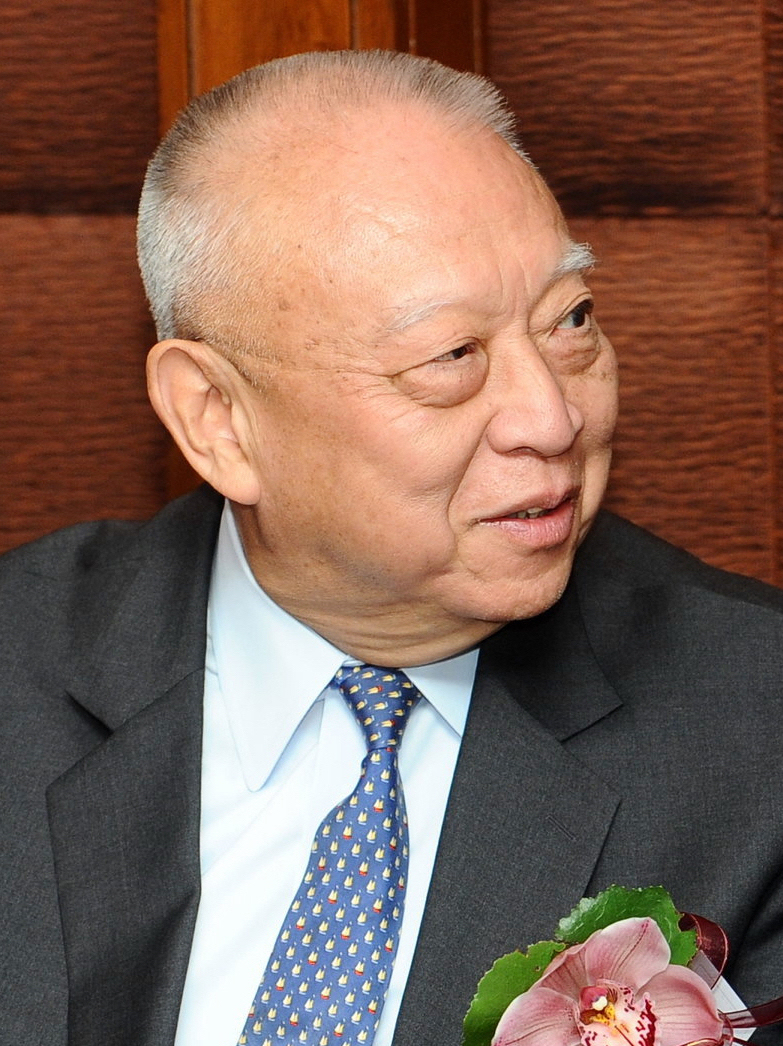
Tung Chee-hwa was responsible for Hong Kong's failed legislation attempt. Protests in June and July 2003 were in part due to the economic downturn after, and mishandling of, the 2002–2004 SARS outbreak.

In September 2002, the Hong Kong government released its "Proposals to Implement Article 23 of the Basic Law" Consultation Document. Consultation lasted until December 2002, being concluded early after protests drew tens of thousands of people against the proposal; concessions were made, but the proposals did not return to public consultation. The National Security (Legislative Provisions) Bill 2003 was introduced in February 2003, aiming to comply with the requirement under Article 23 that the Hong Kong government should enact national security legislation "on its own". However, the bill was abandoned due to overwhelming opposition, noting the unprecedented number of protesters.

The 2003 bill would introduce sedition legislation, as well as offer amendments to the ordinances. While the Region was being encouraged to create legislation in line with the Johannesburg Principles, it did not, and the 2003 provisions would have been more restrictive of civil liberties. The changes were: to narrow the definition of "sedition", requiring someone to deliberately commit acts against the government; to add a 'likelihood' clause, requiring a burden of proof; and to add subversion and secession offences. This last addition was the most problematic part of the bill, with the others seen as steps towards protection. The subversion and secession legislation would make it illegal to threaten the presence and stability of the People's Republic of China (PRC) under laws handling treason and war, and also used vague and undefined terms that left the legal threshold for prosecution unclear.

Though the bill had been introduced in February 2003, major protest towards it did not happen for several months, as Asia was experiencing the SARS epidemic. In June, as the city had recovered, the pro-democracy camp mobilised the public to oppose the bill, and on 1 July, the sixth anniversary of the handover, more than a half million Hong Kong residents took to the streets against Chief Executive Tung Chee-hwa and Secretary for Security Regina Ip, who was in charge of the bill. In the evening of 6 July, Liberal Party chairman James Tien decided to withdraw from the "governing coalition" by resigning from the Executive Council in protest. Knowing that the bill would not be passed without the Liberal Party, the government finally decided to postpone it, before it was shelved indefinitely.

Differences between the 2003 National Security Bill and the 2020 National Security Law
	2003 National Security Bill	2020 National Security Law
Procedure of enactment	Government released consultation document and went through local consultations. Debated and scrutinised in the Hong Kong Legislative Council. Government offered modifications after backlash.	Passed by the National People's Congress (NPC) Standing Committee, pursuant to NPC authorisation. No widespread consultation or release of contents prior to passage.
Police search powers without a court warrant	Authorised under the initial bill, removed by the government as a concession.	Authorised.
Definition of the crime of secession	The use of "force or serious criminal means" that "seriously endangers the stability" of China or engaging in war is necessary to constitute secession.	Secession includes acts "whether or not by force or threat of force".
Actors subject to the law	Subversion and secession are limited to Hong Kong permanent residents, and treason to Chinese nationals regardless of where the crime was committed.	Covers anyone in Hong Kong regardless of nationality or residency status, and also applies to offences committed from outside Hong Kong by a person who is not a permanent resident.
Jurisdiction for prosecution	Hong Kong government and courts retain jurisdiction.	The central government's Office for Safeguarding National Security and the Supreme People's Court may exercise jurisdiction in certain circumstances.

=== 2010s ===
Pro-Beijing Hong Kong politicians have spoken about the proposed law since independence movements grew in Hong Kong. When China announced that "[Beijing] will absolutely neither permit anyone advocating secession in Hong Kong nor allow any pro-independence activists to enter a government institution", Chief Executive Leung Chun-ying said Hong Kong would enact a security law targeting pro-independence movement in Hong Kong. In 2018 Wang Zhimin, director of the Liaison Office of the Central People's Government in Hong Kong, urged the Hong Kong government to enact national security legislation as he said "Hong Kong is the only place in the world without a national security legislation – it's a major weakness in the nation's overall security, and it has a direct impact on residents".

== Prelude to legislation ==
When I reported in 1997 on the Hong Kong celebrations bidding farewell to British rule, there was one question on all lips. It was: how long would Beijing's 50-year pledge of "one nation, two systems" survive? The guesses were five years, perhaps 10. China would surely milk the cash cow for all it was worth, but any sign of trouble and Beijing would instantly wipe this "imperialist pimple" off the map. No one dreamed China's patience would last 23 years.

— Simon Jenkins

In 2019, the Hong Kong government introduced an extradition law amendment bill proposing to allow extradition to countries and territories that have no formal extradition agreements with Hong Kong, including Taiwan and mainland China, in certain circumstances.

The bill sparked continuing protests, and was later withdrawn. The Chinese authorities attributed the instability to failing to exert critical influence over local affairs. The South China Morning Post reported that the Chinese central government believed that the political climate in Hong Kong, due to the protests, precludes the passage of national security legislation under Article 23, while Chief Executive Carrie Lam added that the protests made the law more necessary than before, and so China resorted to enactment of security measures through the National People's Congress (NPC) instead. On 15 April, the head of the Hong Kong Liaison Office, Luo Huining, called for the rapid passing of a national security law for the city.

On 18 June 2020, the Chinese government introduced a draft to the NPC, aiming for the session to take three days. This is a much more rapid process than bills in the NPC, which go through three different rounds of approval.

=== NPCSC decision ===
On 22 May 2020, the NPC approved a decision to authorise the NPCSC to enact a national security law for Hong Kong if Hong Kong did not "legislate national security law according to the Basic Law as soon as possible".

The decision authorises the NPCSC to enact laws for "a sound legal system" in the territory. An NPCSC deputy claims that the Article 23 legislative provisions still have to be passed by August 2021.

== Initial responses and analyses ==
=== Analysis of Chinese government involvement ===
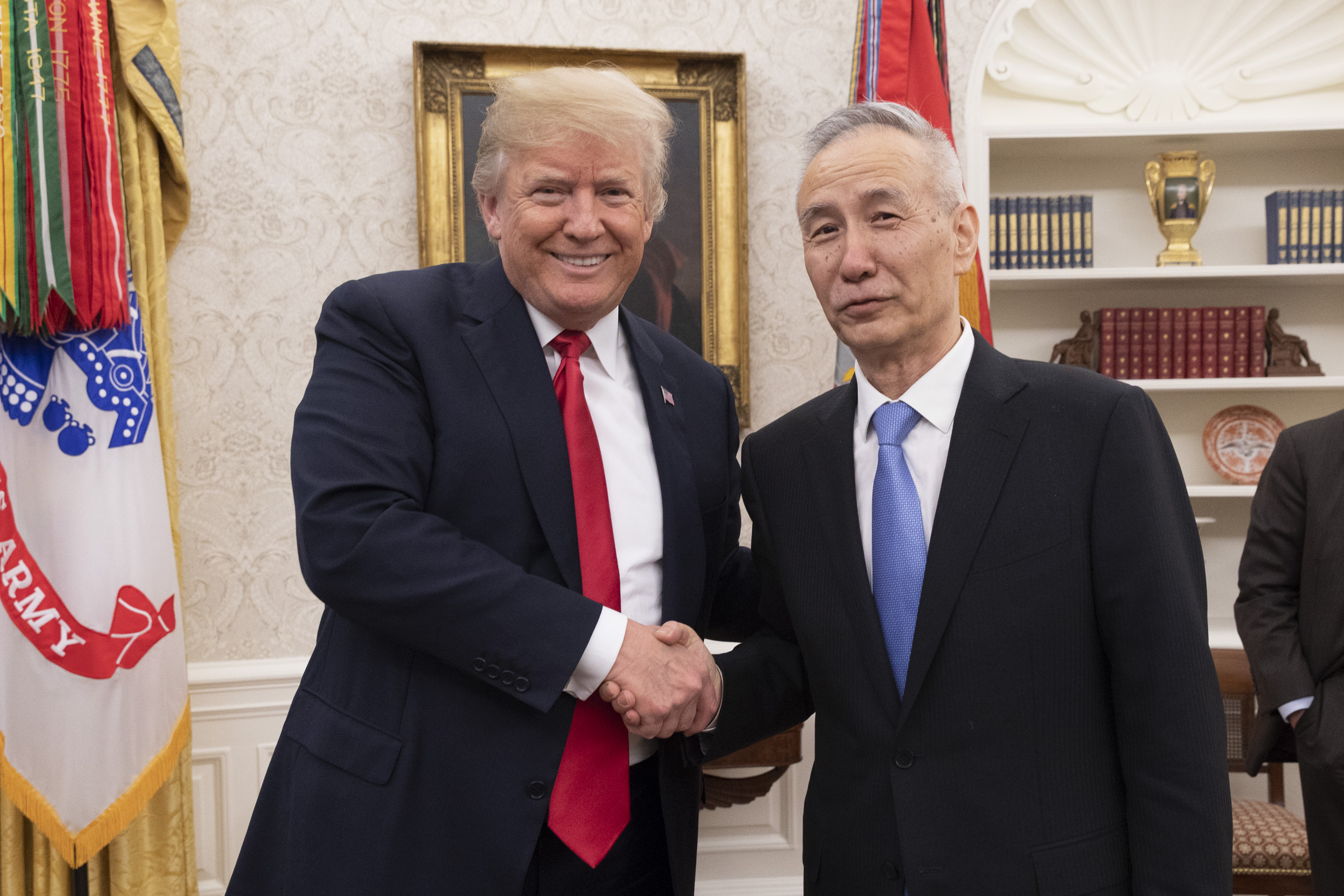
Chinese vice premier Liu He meeting with US president Donald Trump in May 2018. The two nations' deteriorating relations have been suggested as a cause for the Chinese government imposing more restrictions on Hong Kong.

Brian Fong, a political analyst in Hong Kong-Mainland Chinese relations, explains that the move is a dramatic change in Chinese policy, and a risky one that could lead to Beijing "losing access to foreign capital and technology through Hong Kong".

The American diplomat of Asian affairs Daniel R. Russel wrote in The Diplomat on 3 June 2020 that China was "fully aware of both the local and the international reaction it could expect" when the NPC passed its decision about the legislation. Russel explained that the reaction in 2003, the 2019 protests, and some US sanctions favouring Hong Kong over mainland China set the baseline for response to the decision. He also noted that China's reputation was already low internationally because of the COVID-19 pandemic (noting that, "ironically", it was in the same position as in 2003 with SARS and the legislation), especially in the US where "public attitudes toward the other nation have taken a sharp turn for the worse" because of the pandemic that originated in China. However, he added that Beijing had at the time an "increased level of resolve [and] tolerance for negative consequences"; he wrote that forceful economic action from the US may prompt the Chinese government to retaliate with military action in Hong Kong, suggesting that both nations have a disregard for the territory if it can be used for benefit in their trade war and warning that "Hong Kong may be martyred in the process".

On 9 June 2020, The Guardian's China specialists Tania Branigan and Lily Kuo published a report titled "How Hong Kong caught fire: the story of a radical uprising". In it, they wrote that "the nature of [Chinese government involvement] is as alarming as its content: it sets a precedent of Beijing forcing unpopular legislation on Hong Kong", in open defiance of the handover terms. They also look at the approach of the law, explaining that Beijing has given "material security in place of political freedoms" to its people in mainland China, and plans to do the same in Hong Kong because it sees all issues as purely economical and protests only escalating because of "troublemakers and hostile foreign powers". In terms of how it is being executed, the pair assert that in 2020, "Beijing has abandoned any pretence of winning hearts and minds", instead using force to prevent democracy politicians and activists from having platforms, which Branigan and Kuo say is a plan to use fear to suppress Hong Kong, as "persuasion" has not worked.

The Chinese government's legal basis for involvement comes from the Chinese constitution declaring Hong Kong part of China, and Article 18 of the Hong Kong Basic Law allowing for Chinese laws to be valid in Hong Kong if they are included in Annex III. Deutsche Welle expects that the NPCSC national security law will stand as a Chinese national law that applies to Hong Kong, as it will be added to Annex III; Dang Yuan wrote for Deutsche Welle that "Beijing wants to maintain the appearance of Hong Kong's autonomy and continues to insist that Hong Kong pass its 'own' corresponding law" in alignment with the NPCSC legislation. Deutsche Welle wrote that China chose mid-2020 as the time to intervene with a restrictive law because of the likelihood of a democratic majority winning in the Hong Kong elections in September, meaning another Hong Kong attempt at a national security law would be unlikely.

=== Hong Kong ===
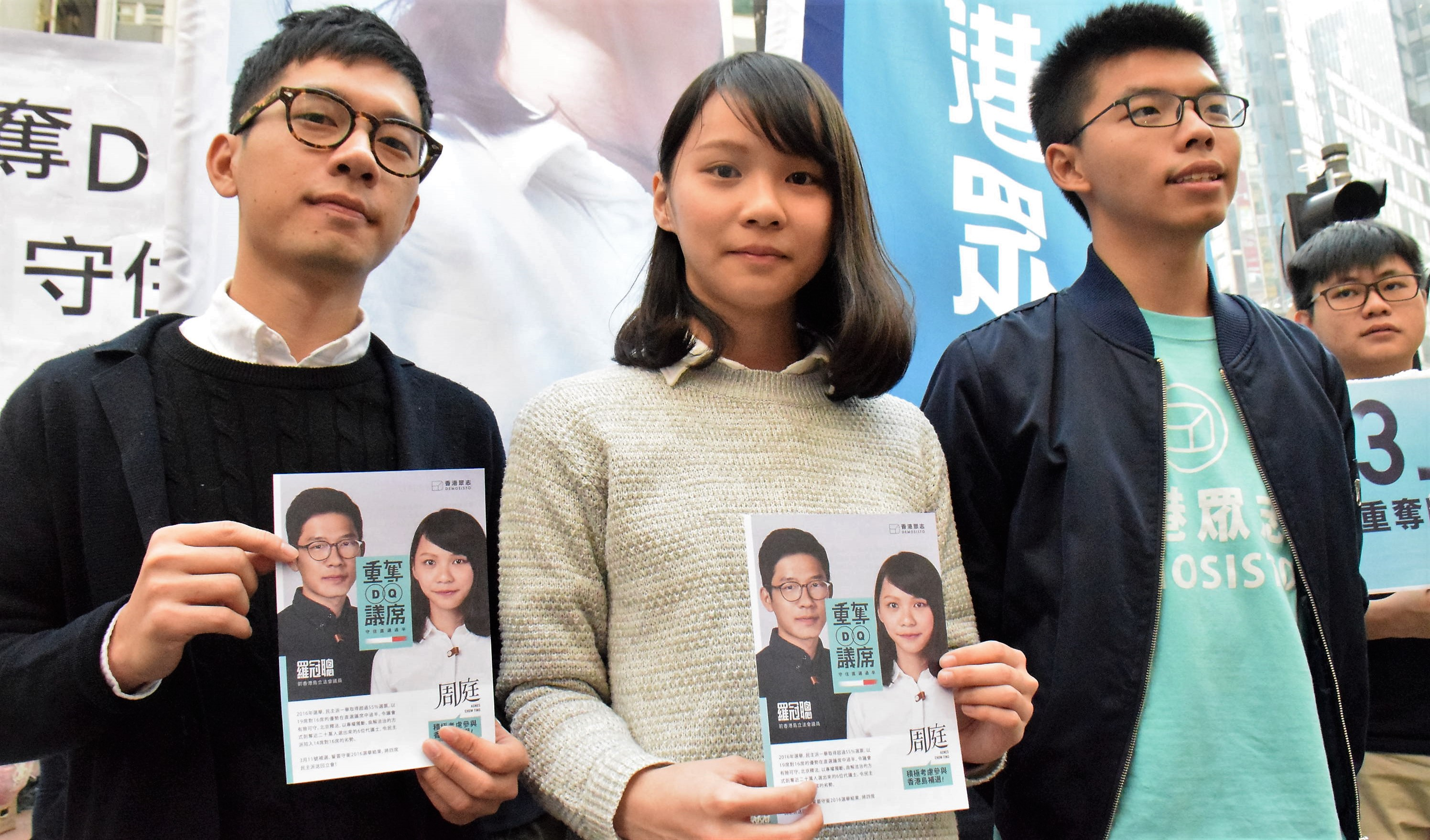
Three prominent pro-democracy activists Nathan Law (left), Agnes Chow (middle), and Joshua Wong (right) left their party Demosistō on 30 June. Later that day, the party announced that it would disband with immediate effect.

A large number of Hong Kong residents opposed the Chinese government proposals. The prospect of any national security law has always been unpopular, but protesters in 2020 said that the new proposals "strikes at the heart of Hong Kong's civic political identity, its success as an international hub. But most of all it strikes at people's sense of belonging". Some Hong Kong opponents of the law hope it will cause other countries to revoke their special treatment toward Hong Kong, which will in turn damage China's economy, using the Cantonese slang term lam chau to describe this.

The Hong Kong Bar Association, the city's professional body representing its barristers, issued a statement saying that it was "gravely concerned with both the contents of the [national security law] and the manner of its introduction." The statement noted that the law was enacted in a way that prevented the city's lawyers, judges, police and residents from understanding its contents in any way prior to its coming into force. The Hong Kong politician Margaret Ng believes that the Chinese government has wanted to implement a national security law in Hong Kong under their terms for years, and are using the 2019 protests as an excuse, saying that "China has always found it difficult to accept the kind of freedom and restraint to power that Hong Kong has under a separate system". Man-Kei Tam, the Hong Kong director of Amnesty International, described the Chinese legislation as "Orwellian".

In light of the passing of the national security law on 30 June, prominent democracy activists Joshua Wong, Nathan Law, Agnes Chow, and Jeffrey Ngo announced that they would be leaving Demosistō, which had been involved in lobbying in the US for the passing of the Hong Kong Human Rights and Democracy Act and the suspension of the city's special trade status. Shortly afterward, Demosistō was disbanded and all operations were ceased. Two other pro-independent groups announced that they had ended their operations in Hong Kong, fearing that they would be the targets of the new law. Nathan Law fled the country shortly afterwards. Adrian Brown from Al Jazeera observed the passing of the law created a chilling effect in the city. According to him, when his team began interviewing ordinary people about their opinions on the passing of the law, many of them declined to comment, a phenomenon which he perceived to be "unusual".

Though the law was not retroactive, many Hong Kong people deleted pro-democracy social media posts and accounts, and asked journalists to destroy evidence of previous conversations. Businesses participating in the yellow economy removed pro-democracy posters, Lennon Walls, and pro-democracy social media posts.

Already after the passage of the NPCSC decision on 22 May, Hong Kong citizens began looking for ways to emigrate and leave Hong Kong, feeling that the law would fundamentally damage their rights of expression and freedom. Ten times the usual number of web searches about emigration were recorded after the decision was announced. Following the British announcement that it would open a route to British citizenship for Hong Kongers born under British rule, a spike in interest in properties in the United Kingdom, Australia, and Canada occurred.

Reuters held a poll of local opinion towards the law, in June before it was implemented. The result showed that a majority of Hong Kongers opposed the law, with 49% strongly opposing it and 7% somewhat opposing it. About a third of Hong Kongers said they supported the law, with 27% strongly supporting it and 7% somewhat supporting it. Reuters conducted another poll after the law was implemented in late August, which showed that 60% of respondents opposed the law and slightly over 31% supported the law. The Hong Kong Research Association interviewed 1,097 adult citizens by telephone on 2–5 July. 66% of the respondents support the National People's Congress Standing Committee's enactment of the "Hong Kong National Security Law" and its implementation in Hong Kong in Annex III of the Basic Law, while 31% do not support it; the survey also shows that 47% of the respondents believe The "Hong Kong National Security Law" has a positive impact on Hong Kong's prospects, 32% of the respondents have no impact, and 17% think it has a negative impact.

The One Country Two Systems Research Institute, a pro-Beijing think tank, conducted a telephone sampling survey in May 2020 and interviewed 963 adult citizens in Hong Kong. The institution reported that to the question "Do you think Hong Kong is responsible for safeguarding the country's security?", 74% of those who answered "Responsible", 16.6% of "No responsibility", and 9.5% of "Don't know/difficult to tell".

On 1 June, a pro-Beijing group claimed it had gathered more than 2.9 million signatures supporting the legislation, through a website and street booths. Around the same time, the heads of the governing council of Hong Kong's eight publicly funded universities jointly backed Beijing's plan to impose a national security law on the city, specifically "the introduction of legislation which prohibits criminal acts that threaten the existence of the state".

=== Republic of China (Taiwan) ===
Taiwanese President Tsai Ing-wen expressed her disappointment with the controversial law and announced that a special office for coordinating humanitarian assistance to the Hong Kong people would officially open on the first of July in response to the law's passage. The Democratic Progressive Party warned that this was the end of the "one country, two systems" policy for Hong Kong and that Taiwanese people travelling to Hong Kong should take care. The head of the Mainland Affairs Council Chen Ming-tong described the law as "a decree issued by the Celestial Empire to the people of the world" due to its impacts on people worldwide not just in Hong Kong.

=== United Kingdom ===
Sure, handover promises to the UK were made but [Xi Jinping] was not going to let some Western attachment to liberty trump loyalty to the motherland. Not on his watch. Enter the security law.

— Stephen McDonell, 30 June 2020

The UK, of which Hong Kong is a former colony, encouraged China to back down on the security law per the provisions of the Sino-British Joint Declaration: terms of the UK handing sovereignty of Hong Kong to China included allowing Hong Kong to maintain autonomy and its British-based form of governance. British First Secretary and Foreign and Commonwealth Secretary Dominic Raab stated that China was violating the Joint Declaration in their attempts to pursue the law. On 3 June, the Chinese government announced that they consider the Joint Declaration to have become void as soon as power was transferred in 1997.

At the start of June 2020, Raab and former Foreign Secretaries called for a formation of a large international alliance to exert pressure on Beijing.

The biannual 11 June 2020 UK Report on Hong Kong (covering the last six months of 2019) had Raab more firmly warn China against interference, as well as reiterating the UK's right to comment on Hong Kong. The report requests that China abstain from interfering in the September elections in Hong Kong, and accuses the Chinese government of torturing a former employee of the British Consulate in Hong Kong, Simon Cheng, who visited the Mainland when working at the British Consulate in Hong Kong. Six days later, the UK said that a new human rights law, which has been stalled in Whitehall for several months, could be used to "sanction Chinese officials if Beijing presses ahead" with the national security law. The British law is to be a form of Magnitsky legislation, for the government to sanction those who commit acts repressing human rights.

The 10 June 2021 semiannual report (covering the last six months of 2020) stated that Beijing had used the national security law in that period to "drastically curtail" free speech and to "stifle political opposition". It further raised concerns about "increasing pressure" on foreign judges. A spokesperson of the Hong Kong government said in response that the report was "inaccurate", a "smearing" of the national security law, and "adopting double standards".

==== Extending Hong Kong British National (Overseas) rights ====
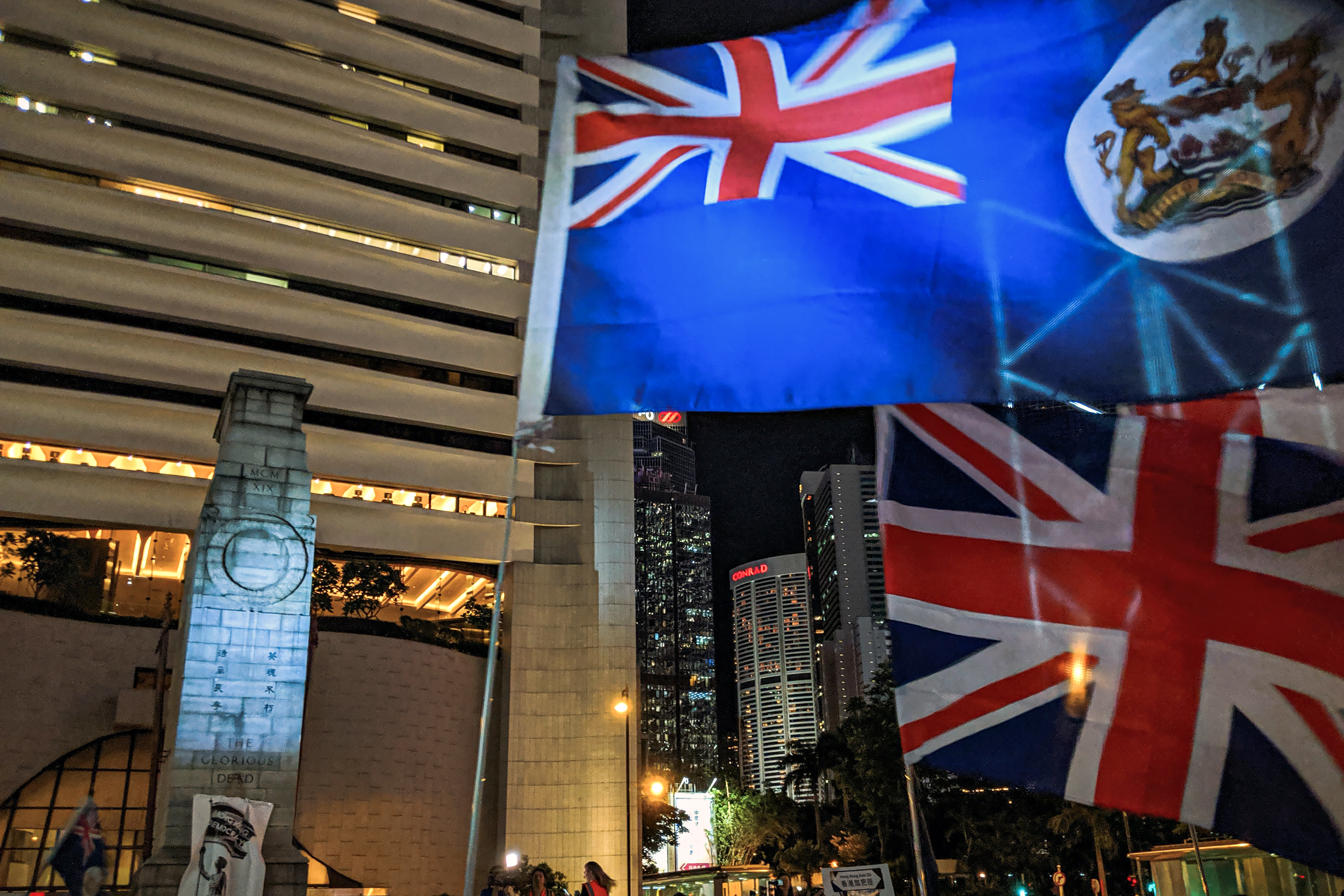
Hong Kong protesters flying both the Union Jack and the colonial Dragon and Lion flag in 2019

In late May and early June 2020, members of the British Cabinet also announced measures to provide a route to British citizenship for 3 million Hong Kong residents. On 3 June, Prime Minister Boris Johnson announced that if China were to continue pursuing the law, he would allow Hong Kong residents with British National (Overseas) passports to claim a visa and open a path to British citizenship for them. Raab said that the UK would sacrifice trade deals with China to support Hong Kong.

Raab delivered a proposal on right of abode legislation to the House of Commons on 2 June. His measure planned to allow BN(O) passport holders to apply for a visa, remain in the UK for an initial period of twelve months instead of six as previously, allow them to apply to study and work, and thereby provide them a path to citizenship. Further to this proposal, Johnson's 3 June announcement would cover all of the approximately 3 million Hong Kong residents with BN(O) status born before 1997.

The extent of the scheme was clarified on 12 June 2020 by Home Secretary Priti Patel in correspondence with Johnson. All people eligible for BN(O) status, as well as their dependents, would be allowed to enter the UK under the scheme. This extent was still criticised for leaving a gap of young adults born after 1997 who were no longer dependents of a BN(O) and thus would not be able to access the scheme. She added that Hong Kong residents could start to come to the UK without restrictions while the scheme was still being set up, if the national security law were passed.

On 1 July, Johnson announced the full plans. BN(O)s and their dependents will be able to apply for a visa allowing them to remain in the UK for 5 years, including being free to work and study. After 5 years they can, under normal British nationality law, apply for settled status and then, a year later, for citizenship. Applications for the BN(O) visa opened on 31 January 2021. By the end of 2022 there had been around 161,000 applications for the BN(O) route.

=== Other countries ===
The UK held a teleconference with its allies in the Five Eyes alliance (the US, Canada, Australia, and New Zealand) in the first few days of June, where they discussed the Hong Kong situation and requested that should the BNO extension go ahead, the other countries would share the burden of taking in Hong Kongers in the resulting exodus. Foreign ministers from the Five Eyes members and Commonwealth realms of Australia, Canada, New Zealand, and the UK jointly wrote a letter to the United Nations requesting "a new special envoy to monitor the impact of the law on Hong Kong", especially noting the national security law proposal came in the week of the anniversary of the Tiananmen Square massacre. Following persuasion from the UK, all members of the G7, notably including Japan, signed an official statement both urging China to reconsider the national security law and expressing concerns about human rights in Hong Kong on 17 June 2020.

==== Australia ====
Australia, with strong ties to Hong Kong, delayed action until 9 July, when the country announced new visa and permit schemes for Hong Kongers to match the UK's offer. That same day, the Australian Government suspended Australia's extradition agreement with Hong Kong. In retaliation, China suspended its extradition agreement with Australia. Beijing also suspended its extradition agreements with the United Kingdom and Canada, which had suspended their extradition agreements with Hong Kong in response to the national security law.

==== New Zealand ====
On 9 July, New Zealand Foreign Minister Winston Peters announced that New Zealand would review "the setting of its relationship" with Hong Kong in response to the introduction of the national security law. On 28 July, New Zealand suspended its extradition treaty with Hong Kong on the grounds that it "eroded rule-of-law principles" and undermined the "one country, two systems" rule. In retaliation, China severed its extradition agreement with New Zealand on 3 August.

==== Japan ====
In Japan, Gen Nakatani, of the Liberal Democratic Party, and Shiori Yamao set up a nonpartisan group, on 29 July, with the aim of easing visa requirements for any Hong Kong citizens leaving the city due to the national security law, and making it easier for Hong Kongers to work and immigrate to Japan. It also urges the Japanese Government to not extradite any potential offenders of the national security law. Under the provisions of the Extradition Act, the general framework for extradition by Japanese Law, political prisoners cannot be extradited to foreign countries, and offenders of the national security law are considered to fall under such status.

==== United States ====
United States President Donald Trump declared that the administrative principle of ''One country, two systems,'' which acted to guide Hong Kong policy as separate from mainland China, was no longer in effect, and issued Executive Order 13936, which terminated Hong Kong's special trade status with the United States. Trump also canceled Fulbright Programs with China.

US Congress passed the Hong Kong Autonomy Act, which in August 2020 issued sanctions on several Hong Kong officials deemed responsible for "undermining the autonomy of Hong Kong," via the National Security Law, including Chief Executive Carrie Lam. Citing human rights concerns, it cancelled its extradition treaty and suspended cooperation on training police and military. On 14 October 2020, the United States Department of State released a report on 10 individuals who it deemed to have "materially" contributed in the past or present to "the failure of [China] to meet its obligations under the Sino-British Joint Declaration and Hong Kong's Basic Law", or attempted to do so. Xia Baolong, Zhang Xiaoming, Luo Huining, Carrie Lam, Teresa Cheng, Erick Tsang, Zheng Yanxiong, Eric Chan, John Lee, and Chris Tang were on the list. Four more officials were sanctioned by the Department of State on 9 November, including Edwina Lau Chi-wai, head of the Committee for Safeguarding National Security; and Li Jiangzhou, deputy director of the Hong Kong Office for Safeguarding National Security. On 7 December 14 vice chairs of the NPCSC were sanctioned by freezing any US assets and barring travel to the United States, a move which China's foreign ministry spokeswoman Hua Chunying strongly condemned on 8 December at a regular press briefing as "vile intention to grossly interfere in internal affairs".

==== Ireland ====
Ireland announced that from 23 October 2020, the extradition treaty to Hong Kong will be suspended due to the implementation of the NSL.

=== Business community ===
On 3 June, the banks HSBC and Standard Chartered gave their backing to the law. HSBC made a post stating the company "respects and supports all laws that stabilise Hong Kong's social order". Standard Chartered stated they believe the law can "help maintain the long-term economic and social stability of Hong Kong". In response, British Foreign Secretary Dominic Raab criticised HSBC's statements, saying "ultimately businesses will make their own judgement calls, but let me just put it this way, we will not sacrifice the people of Hong Kong over the altar of banker bonuses".

Over 61% of the responses in a business community survey said that the law would either have a positive or no impact at all on their businesses over the long term, according to the Hong Kong General Chamber of Commerce. Some 54% viewed the law as "controversial", with the threat of foreign sanctions being seen as their biggest concern, though only affecting business in the short term.

=== Educational community ===
Following the implementation of the national security law Oxford University, along with a number of other universities, took measures to protect their students and faculty from it. Recording of classes was prohibited, work was anonymised, and small group tutorials were replaced with one-on-one meetings with faculty.

In 2021, SOAS University of London warned students and faculty that they could face arrest and prosecution if they brought copies of their lecture notes to Hong Kong or mainland China in either physical or electronic form.

=== Political analysis of British and international responses ===
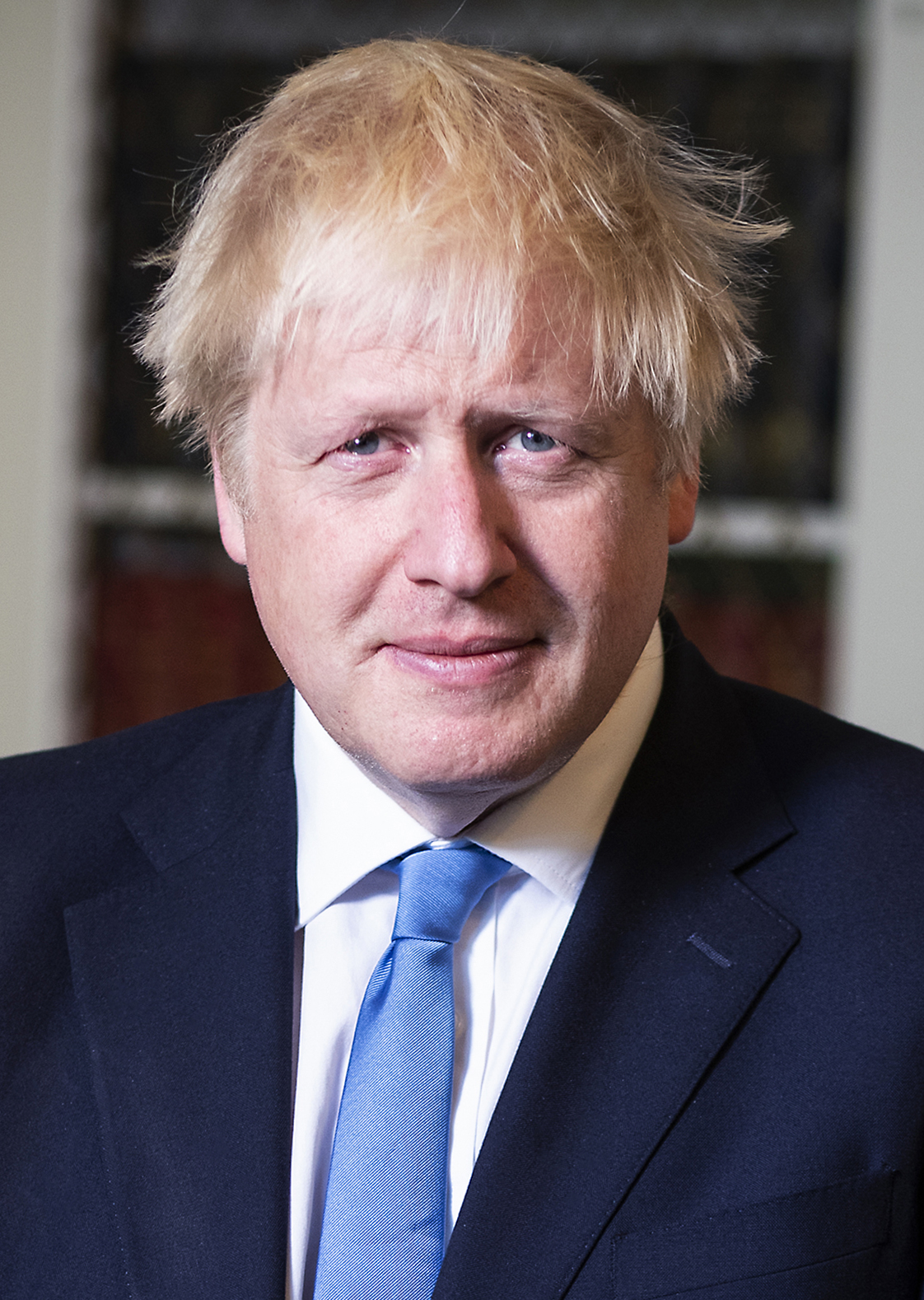
Boris Johnson's stance on Hong Kong is considered firm. Hong Kong Free Press notes that Johnson was once an editor for The Spectator, a British politics magazine that "has for decades campaigned in favour of standing up for Hong Kong and making its citizens British".

Johnson had previously voiced support for Hong Kong autonomy against the proposed extradition bill that incited the protests in 2019. Johnson is seen as taking a more forceful approach to Hong Kong autonomy than former Prime Minister David Cameron; The Guardian's diplomatic editor Patrick Wintour wrote on 3 June 2020 that Cameron had been scared of the public perception of an influx of Hong Kong nationals to the UK in 2015 (when he encouraged China to allow Hong Kong to elect its leader without Beijing interference but went no further), while Johnson's hard stance to allow such mass migration is seen as a risk worth taking because it would also fundamentally undermine China's economy.

Wintour and Guardian journalist Helen Davidson suggested that the ambiguity and possible conflicting statements on the number of Hong Kong residents the BNO measures will be extended to could reflect several things. One reason may be differences in opinion within the Cabinet, but Wintour and Davidson also write that it may be a tactic "to leave China guessing about the potential scale of a British-enabled brain drain from Hong Kong, if Beijing seeks to suppress human rights in the territory".

The director of Hong Kong Watch, a human rights NGO, Johnny Patterson, felt that Johnson's announcement was "a watershed moment in Sino-British relations [because] no sitting PM has made a statement as bold as this on Hong Kong since the handover". Patterson added that it shows "the severity of the situation on the ground [and] the fact that the British government genuinely, and rightly, feel a sense of duty to citizens of Hong Kong and are going to do all they can to stop them becoming the collateral damage of escalating geopolitical tensions".

Davidson and Guardian Australia journalist Daniel Hurst note that despite powerful political calls in the country, and a precedent of good relations with Hong Kong and helping evacuate Chinese people in times of emergency, Morrison had a detached approach to the issue of welcoming fleeing Hong Kongers. They said Australia was "issuing statements of concern jointly with likeminded countries including the US, the UK and Canada, rather than speaking out on its own", and said this was because Australia had recently strained its relations with China when it was early to call for an inquiry related to the spread of COVID-19.

Japan, which signed a statement with the G7 condemning China in relation to imposition of the law on 17 June, is typically neutral to Chinese politics. Wintour suggested that Japan decided to add their voice to the international dissent because of "a growing Japanese perception of the technological threat to Japanese security posed by China". Shinzo Abe said that he wanted Japan to take the lead on the G7's statement, an announcement that drew criticism from China.

In the wake of the new security law implemented in Hong Kong by China, the United Kingdom suspended its extradition treaty with Hong Kong on 20 July 2020. The UK Foreign Secretary Dominic Raab suggested that the revocation of extradition treaty will prevent its misuse.

South Korea has not taken a clear position for or against the national security law. Experts believe that outright support for China on these issues would damage South Korea's vital diplomatic relationship with the US and would also run counter to South Korea's pro-democracy views. At the same time, vocally opposing China would risk damaging South Korea economically, since China is their most prominent trading partner and had already placed informal sanctions on South Korea in the past regarding their participation in the US-led Terminal High Altitude Area Defense (THAAD) missile defence programme announced in July 2016.

== Legislation ==
=== Initial plans ===
...the full text of the law doesn't really matter: the national security law is not an end in itself but a means for China to bring Hong Kong to heel. The law means whatever Beijing wants it to mean...

— Tom Cheshire, Sky News Asia correspondent

Chinese plans for the legislation included most prominently criminalising "separatism, subversion, terrorism and foreign interference", which many interpreted as a crackdown on civil liberties, government critics, and the independence movement. China also planned to implement an intelligence service in Hong Kong under the law, using the PRC's own Ministry of Public Security police force that previously had no power or influence in Hong Kong. Various national governments expressed concern that the Chinese plans would undermine Hong Kong autonomy and the "one country, two systems" policy. The NPC approved the Chinese plans on 29 May 2020, with state media outlet People's Daily declaring that the approval "sends a strong signal [...] to anti-China forces in Hong Kong desperately fighting like a cornered wild beast: your defeat has already been decided".

After gatherings marking the one-year anniversary of the extradition law protest movement on 8 June 2020, Zhang Xiaoming, deputy director of China's Hong Kong and Macau Affairs Office who had been demoted from the director position in February 2020, said that the national security law would only give Hong Kong residents more freedom, saying: "They can be free from the fear of violence. They can ride the train and go shopping freely. They can speak the truth on the street without the fear of being beaten up. In particular, they no longer have to worry about young people being brainwashed."

Carrie Lam refused to rule out that the law could be applied retroactively. The Global Times, controlled by the People's Daily, suggested that past tweets from the pro-democracy Hong Kong businessman Jimmy Lai may be used as evidence to prosecute Lai under the law. Former Chief Executive CY Leung also suspected it may be used to ban Tiananmen Square massacre vigils. On 10 June 2020, Hong Kong police began "establishing dedicated unit to enforce the new law", which had not been formally announced at that point; the next day, the British government revealed that an outline of the Chinese legislation "includes provision for the authorities in Hong Kong to report back to Beijing on progress in pursuing national security education of its people".

While Hong Kong's public universities publicly supported the law and said it will not affect academia and research, scientists in the territory feared that China's censorship of COVID-19 research publication would be extended to Hong Kong under the law. They also expressed concern that Hong Kong will likely be stripped of international funding within academia. A further worry within the field was the growth of self-censorship as a defensive response to fear of being punished for "publishing research that could upset the central government", citing unsuccessful trials as something that could harm market prospects, making scientists fear continuing to work at all. One dean, speaking to Nature in June 2020, insisted the law would not affect publishing, but did acknowledge that access to US data would become restricted.

On 15 June 2020, the 30th anniversary of the Basic Law being officially enacted, Beijing announced that the Chinese government reserves the right to deal with cases under the national security law, expecting the number to be low and in "very special circumstances", and that a mainland security office must be opened in Hong Kong as a demand of the government. The government refused to qualify what the exceptional circumstances may be, leading to fears that the law will be used to arrest critics of Beijing and then have them extradited to the mainland for prosecution. As well as the new mainland security office, Hong Kong must allow Chinese security agencies to operate in the region when needed, and accept that Chinese agencies "will supervise and guide the Hong Kong government". Controversy had already erupted the day before, after police arrested a teenage schoolgirl for protesting by using a knee to pin her neck to the ground, with another officer pinning her at the waist. This drew comparisons to the murder of George Floyd and prompted questions about the use of force on a non-violent minor.

The first concrete details of the legislation were announced on 15 June 2020, but by the time lawmakers in Beijing were approving final drafts on 29 June 2020, Carrie Lam had still not seen a draft of the law. The law went through initial stages of deliberation between 18 and 20 June.

=== Provisions ===
Hong Kong National Security Law (English translation – PDF)

The NPCSC passed the law unanimously, with 163 votes for and none against, on 30 June 2020 and listed it under Annex III of the Basic Law, bypassing Hong Kong approval. Xi Jinping, in his capacity as president, signed the law on the same day. According to media reports, the final law would criminalise secession of Hong Kong, subversion against the Chinese government, terrorism, and colluding with foreign forces. The law is broader than China's own criminal law.

The law came into effect at 2300 local time (1500 UTC) on 30 June and the full text of the law was only published at the time it became effective. BBC noted the significance of the law coming into effect just before the 23rd anniversary of the 1 July 1997 handover, an event that annually draws large pro-democracy protests. Despite this, political leader Wu Chi-wai (of the Hong Kong Democratic Party) said that he will still attend a march on 1 July. Al Jazeera's Katrina Yu said "It's very symbolic that this law has been passed just a day before the anniversary of Hong Kong's handover from Britain back to mainland China", saying it was a power play by China.

The law applies to Hong Kong permanent residents as well as non-residents, and those outside Hong Kong who violate the law. It has six chapters and a total of 66 articles, published in the Hong Kong Government Gazette solely in Chinese in violation of the Official Languages Ordinance, although a de facto official English translation was made available almost immediately afterwards, with the Chinese version prevailing. These cover the four crimes (secession, subversion, terrorism, collusion), which are all punishable with a maximum sentence of life in prison. The minimum sentence for "active participants" is set at 3 years, and under 3 years of detention or restriction for other participants or those that voluntarily surrender. The areas of treason, sedition and theft of state secrets are not covered by the new law, and remained to be implemented by the Hong Kong legislature until the enactment of the Safeguarding National Security Ordinance in March 2024. China announced that they will administer the law, and that it can also be used to prosecute people from other countries. Reviews of the content proved troubling to legal scholars and observers, as it is deemed to be "stronger than many feared, both in scope and penalties". While not carrying life sentences, peaceful protesters could see 10 years in prison if it is judged the protest movement has foreign links, and freedoms will be limited as all "foreign groups, organisations and media" will be subject to oversight from the Chinese government. Chinese intelligence agencies will be present in Hong Kong, and although they must abide by Hong Kong law, their actions are not subject to any form of oversight within Hong Kong. Any decisions made by the new Chinese national security commission will also be immune from facing legal challenge. Still, Reuters noted that the law explains it cannot be retroactively applied to actions that occurred before it was implemented.

Other specific offences are laid out in the law, such as the damage of transport facilities being considered a terrorism offence. Article 29 of the law criminalises "inciting hatred of the central government and Hong Kong's regional government". This also seems to cover written works: on 5 July, at least nine books about democracy were made unavailable in Hong Kong as they were removed or reviewed for violating the law. Article 38 details how foreign nationals committing acts outside of Hong Kong and China are criminally liable under the law, and that such foreigners could be arrested upon arrival in Hong Kong. Anyone found guilty under the law will be barred from public office for life. In respect to China taking control and extraditing suspects, Al Jazeera reported that: "The full text of the law gave three scenarios when China might take over a prosecution: complicated foreign interference cases, 'very serious' cases and when national security faces 'serious and realistic threats'." The law further explains that the action does not need to be violent, and that the minimum sentence in such cases will be 10 years. Emily Feng wrote for NPR that, because of this power, China was effectively installing "an extreme version" of the failed 2019 Hong Kong extradition bill.

As part of the Chinese security presence in Hong Kong, the law provides for the establishment of the Office for Safeguarding National Security of the CPG in the HKSAR, a bureau exempt from Hong Kong jurisdiction that can, if the Central People's Government of the PRC chooses to grant it jurisdiction, prosecute cases under the Criminal Procedure Law of the People's Republic of China. On 3 July 2020, Zheng Yanxiong was appointed head of the bureau. Zheng is considered to have strong nationalist views on national security, including a dislike for media. On 6 July 2020 the Hong Kong government published the Implementation Rules for Article 43. The rules enable the Hong Kong Police Force to conduct searches at private properties without a warrant, restrict suspects' movements, freeze their assets and intercept communications. The police can also require publishers, hosting providers and internet service providers to remove, or block or restrict access to, content that the police think is likely to constitute an offence under the national security law. If the providers do not co-operate immediately the police can seize equipment and remove the content themselves.

People prosecuted under the law will face different judges with special designation to the Hong Kong judiciary; BBC China correspondent Stephen McDonell wrote on 30 June that Hong Kong's judges are independent and can appropriately interpret the law, which the Chinese government will not accept, and so judges will be appointed for this matter by the Chief Executive directly. McDonell writes that this is "effectively installed by Beijing". This brought into question the role of Commonwealth of Nations, including many British, justices that hear cases in Hong Kong, though Chief Justice Geoffrey Ma spoke up on 2 July to say that judges will be chosen by merit rather than political affiliation, and foreign judges will be permitted. Some cases in Hong Kong can be held without juries if it is deemed they contain state secrets; similarly, the press and public will not be allowed to observe some court proceedings for some cases. The Guardian pointed out that closed-door trials are often used in mainland China in cases involving political dissidents. The law does not presume bail will be granted for those arrested under it, and there is no limit to how long these people may be held.

Amendments gazetted on 23 March 2026 were the first major amendments to the law since its enactment. Among other things it renders denying passwords or decryption tools during national security investigations punishable with up to a year of imprisonment. Comparatively the UK punishes the same offence with up to five years' imprisonment.Overseas political organisations or their agents that fail to provide information to authorities can now face a maximum of one year's imprisonment, up from six months. Those providing false or misleading information can face up to three years' imprisonment. Customs officers have also been empowered to seize articles, including books and publications, deemed seditious to prevent them from entering the city from overseas.

== International reactions ==
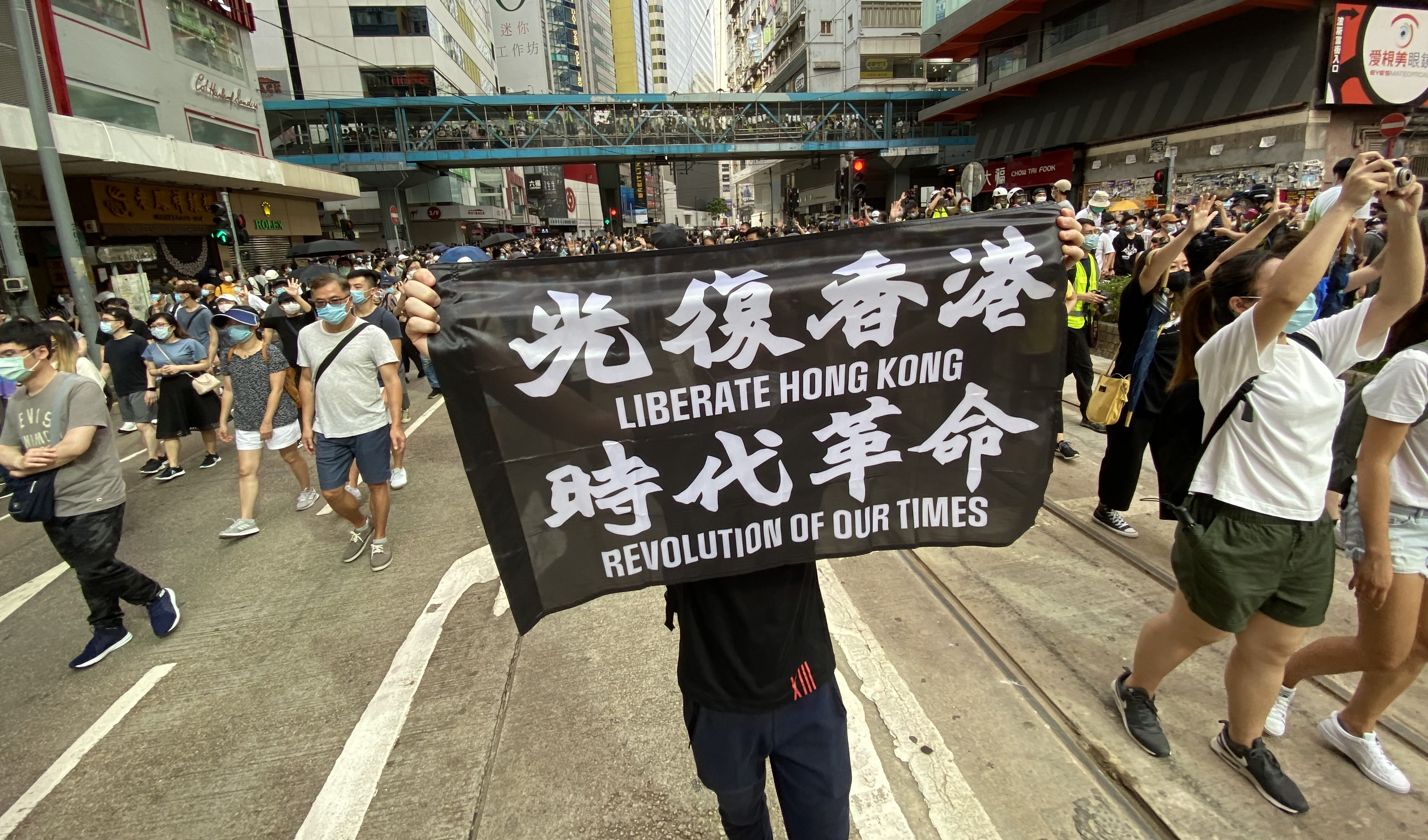
On 1 July 2020, the day after implementation of the security law, tens of thousands of Hong Kong people gathered on the streets in Causeway Bay to march. On 2 July, the Hong Kong government declared the 'Liberate Hong Kong, revolution of our time' slogan depicted on a banner here – "the most resonant slogan of its protest movement" – to be subversive and in violation of the law.

More countries and groups responded after the law was enacted on 30 June 2020. The UK, the President of the European Council, and NATO responded with statements that China was destroying the rule of law in Hong Kong, and the UK, Taiwan and Canada warned their citizens against visiting Hong Kong. Presidents Ursula von der Leyen of the European Commission and Charles Michel of the European Council announced that they would discuss within Europe whether to discredit China as a trading partner. Speaking in the UK House of Commons, Foreign Secretary Dominic Raab announced that the British National Overseas offer still stands, and saying that the UK may take further action if the full text of the law shows further breaches of the Joint Declaration. Germany also called for the postponed European Union-China summit to be rescheduled as soon as possible, while Japan spoke forcefully against China. France began more fervently reaching out to national leaders to create an international "anti-Chinese alliance".

A 30 June meeting of the United Nations Human Rights Council saw a majority of countries express support for the law. The British ambassador to the UN presented a statement on behalf of 27 other countries to the UN, criticising the law. The Cuban ambassador responded with a statement on behalf of 52 other countries in support of the law, stating that "Hong Kong affairs are China's internal affairs that brook no interference by foreign forces." The statement criticised the discussion of the law in the UNHRC itself, reasoning that "non-interference in internal affairs of sovereign states is an essential principle enshrined in the Charter of the United Nations and a basic norm of international relations." The China Media Project found that media reporting on the statement in the signatory countries besides China was scant, and in most cases ultimately sourced, through content sharing arrangements, from Chinese state media agency Xinhua.

Support and opposition to the law at the UNHRC on 30 June 2020 Supportive Opposed

Tom Cheshire, Sky News's Asia correspondent, wrote on 30 June 2020 that the law and its strength was evidence that the Chinese government does not care what the world thinks of its behaviour, that Xi Jinping could not wait until 2047 to take over Hong Kong, and that the timing suggests China felt the distraction of the COVID-19 pandemic on the rest of the world made it an easier moment to impose the law. The same view was expressed by the BBC's diplomatic correspondent on 2 July, who wrote that "the Covid-19 crisis gave Beijing the opportunity to bring the Hong Kong crisis to a head", while CNN expressed that the pandemic as well as "the antics of the Trump administration" were used as distraction, noting that the situation of world politics at the time was "discombobulated".

Both political parties in the US created bills to provide refugee status for Hong Kong residents, for those "at risk of persecution" because of the law, and a bill passed in the House of Representatives on 2 July to sanction US banks that deal with China. Titled the Hong Kong Autonomy Act, it will now pass to the US president. British journalist Simon Jenkins wrote an opinion piece on the law and its response, expressing pride at the democracy still shown in Hong Kong but also affirming that even these local democracy activists have long felt Hong Kong would end up a Chinese enclave. Jenkins suggested the law was damaging and inevitable, and the only appropriate response is to help the Hong Kongers who believe in democracy to leave. On 3 July, Canada announced that it would stop extraditing people to Hong Kong, stop exporting certain goods including weapons to the Region, and would consider introducing new Hong Kong immigration measures, and Taiwan's Mainland Affairs Council issued a formal warning which advised Taiwanese citizens against visiting China, Hong Kong, or Macao in light of the new security law so that they do not become a "second Lee Ming-che". On 9 July, Australia matched Canada in retracting its extradition deal, and matched the UK by establishing a path to permanent residency for Hong Kongers.

After being granted asylum by the UK, Simon Cheng suggested that he and other Hong Kong democracy activists may start a Hong Kong parliament-in-exile that would reflect the real and free views of the people of Hong Kong. Critics say the law marks Beijing's full takeover of Hong Kong, which was promised 50 years of a "high degree of autonomy" after the handover. Alvin Cheung, a legal scholar focusing on Hong Kong issues at New York University's US-Asia Law Institute, opined: "A national security law was imposed on Hong Kong through a process nobody in Hong Kong had any control over, with content nobody in Hong Kong was privy to. That should put an end to the notion that Hong Kong remains autonomous in any meaningful way". Rights advocates and legal scholars believe the law will be used broadly to stifle dissent. Joshua Rosenzweig, the head of Amnesty International's China Team, said, "The passing of the national security law is a painful moment for the people of Hong Kong and represents the greatest threat to human rights in the city's recent history. From now on, China will have the power to impose its own laws on any criminal suspect it chooses".

CNN also expressed concern for the freedom of speech of foreign media, as several companies – including itself, Bloomberg, and Agence France-Presse – have their Asian headquarters in Hong Kong.

As per an announcement by the United Nations Human Rights Council from October 2021, four of its human rights experts (Fionnuala Ní Aoláin, Clément Nyaletsossi Voule, Irene Khan and Mary Lawlor) had submitted a detailed analysis regarding the national security law to the central government. The experts called for "reinvigoration of an independent judiciary in Hong Kong, a pause in applying this law, and a fundamental reconsideration of its use". The United Nations Human Rights Committee stated in July 2022 that the national security law was incompatible with the International Covenant on Civil and Political Rights (ICCPR). It cited the "conundrum" of China not being a party of the ICCPR as one of the committee's reasons for calling for a "complete repeal" of the national security law. The Hong Kong government said in response that the report contained "unfair criticisms", and that its recommendations had been made "without giving due weight to the unique circumstances of Hong Kong".

On 15 June, the European Parliament passed a resolution concerning Hong Kong's shrinking rights to free speech, and specifically demanded the release of and the dropping of charges against media tycoon and pro-democracy activist Jimmy Lai.

== Extraterritoriality ==
Article 38 of the law exerts extraterritorial jurisdiction over persons outside of Hong Kong who are not Hong Kong residents, which criminalises acts of subversion as defined in the law by anyone anywhere in the world. The introduction of the law, and particularly Article 38, caused individuals and international organisations to scramble to adapt to China's increasing extraterritorial reach. A number of organisations closed down entirely and the exodus of refugees from Hong Kong has increased.

This Law shall apply to offences under this Law committed against the Hong Kong Special Administrative Region from outside the Region by a person who is not a permanent resident of the Region.

— Hong Kong national security law Chapter III, Part 6, Article 38

Taiwanese outlets reported that a Hong Kong legal scholar, Eric Cheung, sarcastically said "there are 8 billion people who will have to read the national security law" so that they do not break it, and asserted that they have the legal right to enforce it on anyone. A US-based China correspondent for the media outlet Axios, Bethany Allen-Ebrahimian, suggested that the inclusion of Article 38 was primarily targeting the Hong Kong diaspora and aiming to prevent dissident organisation within Hong Konger communities abroad.

The law, due to its wide spectrum, has impacted Hong Kong students living abroad. Some Hong Kong students studying abroad have reported that they fear returning home due to the possibility of being arrested under the national security law.

On 21 April 2023, an unnamed female Hong Kong student who came back from Japan to update her ID was detained due to online comments she made that are critical of the Hong Kong government. She made suggestions that Hong Kong should have independence. Her passport was temporarily confiscated, preventing her from going back to continue with her post-secondary education.

In July 2023, the Security Bureau said that extraterritoriality was a "common feature" of national security laws in other jurisdictions, and that "Extraterritorial application vested in the Hong Kong National Security Law (NSL) is in line with the well-recognised international law principle of 'protective jurisdiction' and international practice."

== Enforcement ==
On 1 July 2020, many protesters took to the streets despite the official 1 July march being banned by the police. Ten people were arrested for breaking the new law. Police were taking DNA samples of suspects arrested on suspicion of breaking the NSL.

On 29 July 19-year-old Tony Chung and three other former members of the pro-independence group "Studentlocalism" were arrested on suspicion of inciting secession, becoming the first political figures to be so arrested under the national security law. Chung said the men who abducted him took him to a shopping centre where his telephone was forcibly unlocked, and then went to search his home in Yuen Long. The three were later released on bail. On 27 October, Chung was again arrested and detained along with two other activists, and charged on 29 October with several offences, including the national security related charge of secession. He was refused bail. In November 2021, Chung was sentenced to a total of three years and seven months in jail, three years and four months of which were for a national security secession charge.

On 10 August, Apple Daily founder Jimmy Lai was arrested under the "collusion with foreign powers" charge, alongside six others associated with his enterprise Next Media. Over 200 police forces raided the Next Media headquarters in Tseung Kwan O. On the same day, activists Agnes Chow, Andy Li, and Wilson Li were also arrested on various national security charges. The raid on Apple Daily triggered mass outpouring of support for the newspaper, with share prices of Next Media soaring by 300% as supporters of the newspaper bought up shares of the company to show their support. Other independent local media companies that have reported negatively on the government over the past year, such as TVMost and i-Cable Communications, also saw significant share price rises as citizens flocked to invest in media companies to express their support for the freedom of the press.

Teachers have been investigated for being overly critical of the police, and some courses that might violate the new law have been cancelled. Opposition legislators fear if they vote in a way not aligned with the Beijing government, they may be prosecuted.

In October 2021, court rulings allowed authorities to probe acts that pre-date the security law under the Crimes Ordinance.

On 5 November, Hong Kong police opened a tip-off line for email, SMS as well as the mainland-based messaging platform WeChat, to allow members of the public to "provide or report national security related information", as per the police website. On social media, police urged citizens to share "information, photographs, audio or video". The anonymity of those reporting would be protected. Before the rollout, pro-democracy activist Joshua Wong opined that the line would be prone to misuse, and that it would encourage citizens to "snitch" on each other. By the morning of 6 November, police reported that it had received more than 2,500 pieces of information. In March 2022, police commissioner Raymond Siu said that over 210,000 pieces of information had been received, many of which had been useful in anti-violence and anti-terror operations. By June 2025, over 920,000 reports had been made to the hotline according to security chief Chris Tang.

As of 12 June 2025, and as per information from the Security Bureau, 326 people had been arrested under the Hong Kong national security law and the Safeguarding National Security Ordinance – including an unknown number of those held under the non-NSL charge of sedition prior to when the Ordinance was enacted in March 2024. As per the same date, of those, 165 had been convicted.

In June 2025, the Hong Kong government warned that celebrations of US Independence Day may violate the NLS.

=== International warrants ===
On 31 July, according to Chinese state media, the Hong Kong police issued arrest warrants for six activists outside of Hong Kong citing suspected violations of the law. These are Nathan Law, who left Hong Kong prior to the NSL coming into effect; Simon Cheng, a former employee by the British consulate in Hong Kong who was detained by the PSB and allegedly tortured, and who was granted asylum in the United Kingdom; Ray Wong, who skipped bail and was granted asylum in Germany in May 2018; and pro-independence activists Wayne Chan and Honcques Laus. Also on the wanted list is Samuel Chu, a naturalised American citizen and managing director of the Hong Kong Democracy Council in Washington. He reacted by saying that Hong Kong police were targeting a US citizen of 25 years for lobbying his own government, warning that although the first, he would not be the last non-Chinese citizen to be intimidated in this way.

On 11 August, the day after the arrest of Jimmy Lai under the law, Finn Lau, an ex–chartered surveyor living in the United Kingdom and known as the inventor of the concept of "lam chau", was listed as wanted by Hong Kong police under the national security law.

On 10 March 2022, the CEO and co-founder of UK-based NGO Hong Kong Watch, Benedict Rogers, was ordered to take down the organisation's website by the Hong Kong Police Force. Failure to comply would be liable to a fine and imprisonment.

== Self-assessed impact in Hong Kong ==
In an interview with mainland-owned newspaper Commercial Daily published on 19 October 2020, Hong Kong Chief Executive Carrie Lam spoke positively about the effects of the national security law, and about the progress of the integration of the CPGNSO Office for Safeguarding National Security with the Hong Kong police and the Department of Justice. She further said that the first "instant result" of the law was the "restoration of social stability". During a visit of Lam to Beijing, Senior Vice-Premier and Politburo member Han Zheng on 7 November commended her administration for achieving "notable results" in "implementing the national security law and safeguarding the stability of Hong Kong society".

On 15 April 2021, at a day of citywide activities to encourage residents to support the national security law, security office head Zheng Yanxiong thanked the Hong Kong people who, in his words, had "arrived through a very natural and reasonable process at acceptance, welcoming and support" for the law.

In a radio interview on 11 July 2021, Lam said that the national security law was "relatively mild by international standards", and that the understanding of citizens of the law had to be strengthened through education. In her annual policy address on 6 October 2021, Lam said that the national security law and the 2021 Hong Kong electoral changes had brought the city "back on the right track", and claimed that initial concerns in the business sector about the impact of the law had "notably subsided".

In September 2023, former Hong Kong politician Abraham Razack said that the government should focus less on national security issues and more on the economy.

== See also ==
- 2021 arrests of Hong Kong pro-democracy primaries participants
- 2021 Hong Kong electoral changes
- Censorship in Hong Kong
- HKSAR v Lai Chee Ying & Others
- Macau national security law
- One country, one system, although it is not a system implemented by the Chinese government, is being raised by Western critics.
- Separation of powers in Hong Kong
- Fragile Bard
- Democratic backsliding
