= Let Only Red Flowers Bloom =

Political book about China

- English original cover
- Author: Emily Feng
- Language: English; Chinese
- Subject: Xi Jinping
- Genre: Non-fiction
- Publisher: Crown Publishing Group (English); Acropolis Publish (Chinese)
- Publication date: March 2025 (English); April 2026 (Chinese)
- ISBN: 9780593594223 (English)

Let Only Red Flowers Bloom: Identity and Belonging in Xi Jinping's China (Chinese: 唯紅花綻放：習近平時代的認同與歸屬) is a book written by American journalist Emily Feng and translated into Chinese by Taiwanese translator Hung Hui-fang. The English edition was published in March 2025, and the Traditional Chinese edition was published in April 2026.

== Book title ==
In Let Only Red Flowers Bloom: Identity and Belonging in Xi Jinping's China, the phrase “let only red flowers bloom” serves as a metaphor for China under the general secretaryship of Xi Jinping, referring to the pursuit of ideological “purity” and the comprehensive exclusion of “heterogeneity”. In other words, it asks what society would become if only the Chinese Communist Party and a single ideology remained.

== Content ==
The book is primarily based on Feng's reporting in China between 2015 and 2022, covering topics such as COVID-19 lockdowns, religion, and the lives of ordinary people. It focuses on changes in national identity in China during Xi Jinping’s rule. The book recounts the stories of 20 individuals who resisted under the “national rejuvenation” (民族復興) project, including Uyghur families, human rights lawyers, teachers in Inner Mongolia, Hong Kong exiles, and figures such as the woman chained in Xuzhou. The narrative depicts experiences of identity, freedom of speech, and survival under a highly repressive political environment.

The book also documents various responses from those on the margins of the system: those who protested, those who stayed, those forced into diaspora, and those struggling between silence and self-preservation. It portrays both the rigidity of the system and the alienation of individuals under a powerful collective will.

The first four chapters describe how optimistic visions of China under Xi Jinping collapse amid shrinking political and economic space. Chapters five to seven examine how different ethnic groups in China are suppressed when their identities—shaped by religion and language—diverge from those defined by the Han majority and the Party. Chapters eight to ten focus on Hong Kong people’s identity under political pressure and changes following the 2019–2020 Hong Kong protests. Chapters eleven and twelve discuss those who fled, whose identities are shaped by historical factors and cross-strait politics, as well as those in Europe and the United States who face dilemmas of loyalty amid China–U.S. tensions.

== Author ==
The author, Emily Feng, is a China correspondent for National Public Radio (NPR). In 2019, she frequently traveled to Beijing and Hong Kong to cover the 2019–2020 Hong Kong protests. Each time she arrived at Beijing Capital International Airport, she was questioned about her work and had her phone and computer inspected. Chinese state media later labeled her a “traitor to the nation”, and in 2021 she was criticized by state media for colluding with foreign forces and breaching local national security rules. In 2022, she was denied entry into China after traveling internationally on vacation.

== Controversies ==
=== Hong Kong national security operation ===
On 15 July 2026, two Hong Kong independent bookstores, Have A Nice Stay (留下書舍) and Greenfield Bookstore, were searched by the Hong Kong Police Force National Security Department. Five staff members and persons in charge—three women aged between 30 and 59, and two men aged 37 and 57—were arrested under Article 24 of the Safeguarding National Security Ordinance for “doing an act or acts with seditious intent”. Those arrested included the founder of Have A Nice Stay, Sum Wan Wah.

The operation followed a referral from the Hong Kong Customs and Excise Department, which reported that a shipment from overseas contained publications with seditious intent, including this book. This marked the third time in 2026 that independent bookstore staff in Hong Kong were arrested by national security authorities, following cases involving Book Punch and Hunter Bookstore.

Police stated that the publications in question were suspected of “inciting hatred against the Hong Kong Special Administrative Region Government, the judiciary, and law enforcement agencies”, and thus conducted searches and seized evidence.

Secretary for Security Chris Tang responded that the government would not establish a “banned books list”, noting that the law clearly defines “seditious intent”. He added that publishing such a list could allow individuals to evade enforcement by changing book titles, thereby undermining the law. On 16 July 2026, he reiterated in the Legislative Council of Hong Kong that enforcement targets content rather than titles, and that booksellers are responsible for ensuring their products do not endanger national security.

=== Responses ===
Hung Shih-han, editor-in-chief of the Taiwanese publisher Acropolis Publish, described the book as “relatively moderate”, stating that it does not advocate overthrowing the Chinese Communist Party but instead portrays how ordinary people in China find their lives becoming increasingly difficult. He said he could not determine why the book was classified as a “seditious publication”, adding that political suppression often involves “countless unclear motives”. He also argued that red lines and banned books are deliberately ambiguous and rely heavily on self-censorship, while emphasizing that publishing should remain free, diverse, and flourishing.

On 16 July 2026, President of the Republic of China Lai Ching-te expressed concern, stating that independent bookstores are vital spaces for safeguarding ideas and that Hong Kong’s freedoms of publishing, reading, and expression face “sustained and severe” pressure. He warned that if books become criminal evidence and bookstores must guess invisible red lines, public discourse will be increasingly constrained. Citing martial law in Taiwan, he stressed that “thought and writing should not be restricted by political pressure”. Mainland Affairs Council spokesperson Liang Wen-chieh stated that the incident shows restrictions on freedom of speech and publication in Hong Kong after the implementation of national security laws, warning that “Hong Kong is no longer the Hong Kong it once was”.

Democratic Progressive Party legislator Huang Jie criticized the Chinese Communist Party for depriving Hong Kong people of freedom of thought and reading, stating that the Hong Kong government “fears even a single book” and that this demonstrates that one country, two systems is a “century-long deception”.

Images of arrested staff from Greenfield Bookstore circulated widely on social media, showing them wearing shirts reading "I am a bookstore clerk" (我是書店店員). These were shared by Feng and Chinese democracy activist Wang Dan. Wang described the image as the “photo of the year in Hong Kong”, symbolizing courage, and remarked that "only courage can change the world".

Hong Kong commentator Fung Hei-kin wrote in a satirical article that the operation intensified international criticism of China and undermined efforts toward peaceful reunification. He suggested that if such widely reported issues are deemed seditious, authorities would effectively need to block the internet, and that the action contradicts the State Council white paper on Hong Kong’s national security, which opposes the overexpansion of security concepts.

Human Rights Watch China researcher Yalkun Uluyol stated that the incident reveals that what the Chinese government fears most is "people thinking freely", arguing that authorities seek to confine thought within permitted boundaries. He called on democratic governments to pressure Hong Kong authorities to release the arrested bookstore staff and continue advocating for detained journalists and Jimmy Lai.

=== Buying surge ===
Following the incident, the book quickly topped bestseller charts in Taiwan, including first place on Books.com.tw, fourth on Eslite Bookstore’s daily rankings, and second on Kingstone’s real-time list. Taiwan Democratic Progressive Party councilor Hsu Chia-Jui remarked: “There is a book that cannot be bought in China or Hong Kong, and now cannot be bought in Taiwan either. In Hong Kong it was removed by an authoritarian government; in Taiwan it was sold out by a free society. That is our greatest difference.”

The book sold out within a day of the incident. Acropolis Publish announced an emergency reprint on 17 July 2026, with restocking expected around 22 July 2026.
