= Finn Lau =

Hong Kong activist

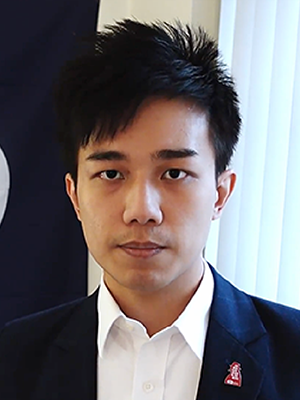
- Lau in 2020
- Born: Lau Cho-dik; 25 October 1993 (age 31)
- Other names: I want Lam Chau (Chinese: 我要攬炒)
- Occupation: Political Activist (Former: Chartered Surveyor)
- Organization(s): Founder of Hong Kong Liberty and Stand with Hong Kong
- Known for: Popularising the doctrine Lam Chau

Finn Lau Cho-dik
- Traditional Chinese: 劉祖廸
- Simplified Chinese: 刘祖廸
Transcriptions
Standard Mandarin
- Hanyu Pinyin: Liú Zǔdí
Yue: Cantonese
- Jyutping: lau4 zou2 dik6

"I want Lam Chau"
- Traditional Chinese: 我要攬炒
- Simplified Chinese: 我要揽炒
Transcriptions
Standard Mandarin
- Hanyu Pinyin: Wǒ yào lǎnchǎo
Yue: Cantonese
- Jyutping: ngo5 jiu3 laam5-2 caau2

Finn Lau Cho-dik (Chinese: 劉祖廸; born 25 October 1993) is a political activist from Hong Kong known for popularising a protesting strategy coined "Lam Chau" and being the founder of Hong Kong Liberty and Stand with Hong Kong. He was previously only known as the LIHKG user with the username "I want Lam Chau". On 5 October 2020, he publicised his real identity as Finn Lau and announced that he, as the founder of both teams, would split Hong Kong Liberty and Stand with Hong Kong. The two organisations are currently operating separately.

== Early life and surveyor career ==
Lau was originally a surveyor who claimed to have no political background or association with any political parties at all, and said that he was "only a Hong Konger who loves Hong Kong". He qualified as a surveyor and worked in Hong Kong, Singapore, and the United Kingdom. He has been based in London, UK since 2019.

In November 2023, Lau wrote the foreword of the book The Mosaic Effect, co-authored by Canadian Military Intelligence Analyst, Scott McGregor and Journalist Ina Mitchell.

== 2019–20 protests ==
=== Lam Chau strategy ===
During the early stage of the 2019–2020 Hong Kong protests, he suggested the strategy Lam Chau as the user "I want Lam Chau" on the forum LIHKG and gained attention for it. He called for the citizens to request foreign governments to cancel the passports of Hong Kong government officials, pro-China personnel, and their families. He reasoned that as many of the Hong Kong government officials and pro-China legislators were holding foreign passports, they would be able to disregard the long term effects their policies may have on Hong Kong, thus cancelling their passports would force them to reconsider the potential harm in legislating the anti-extradition bill. The concept of Lam Chau since then went popular among protesters, with many citing the line in The Hunger Games "If we burn, you burn with us" to rally for the concept. The line later became a popular slogan in the movement, often appearing on different Lennon Walls.

=== Founding Stand with Hong Kong ===
After gaining widespread support on the forum LIHKG, Lau proposed and founded Hong Kong Liberty on 10 June 2019 and Stand with Hong Kong in early July 2019, recruiting its members on the forum and Telegram, with himself aiming to implement the doctrine of Lam Chau. The team later launched a series of campaigns throughout the anti-extradition movement, seeking to rally the international community to support the protest in Hong Kong. Some of the team's more prominent campaigns including the global rally across 15 countries in August 2019, advertisements on the headlines of popular newspapers such as the Guardian or the Spectator, and the sanction report in November 2019 that proposed a name list of human right abusers to be sanctioned by the Hong Kong Human Rights and Democracy Act.

=== Arrest and self-exile ===
On 1 January 2020, Finn was arrested in the 2020 New Year's Day March but was released after being detained for 48 hours, as the police did not know at that time that he was a member of Stand with Hong Kong but thought he was a common protester. After being released, Finn returned to London, where he was working as a surveyor, and continued his activism there. In August 2020, an arrest warrant for Lau was issued under the newly promulgated Hong Kong national security law.

In July 2023, the Hong Kong government offered a HK$ one million bounty for Lau's capture and said that Lau and other exiled activists would be "pursued for life." In June 2024, the Hong Kong government revoked the passport of Lau, exercising powers that it had been granted under the Safeguarding National Security Ordinance. Lau said in response that he had never owned or applied for a Hong Kong passport.

== Hong Kong Liberty ==
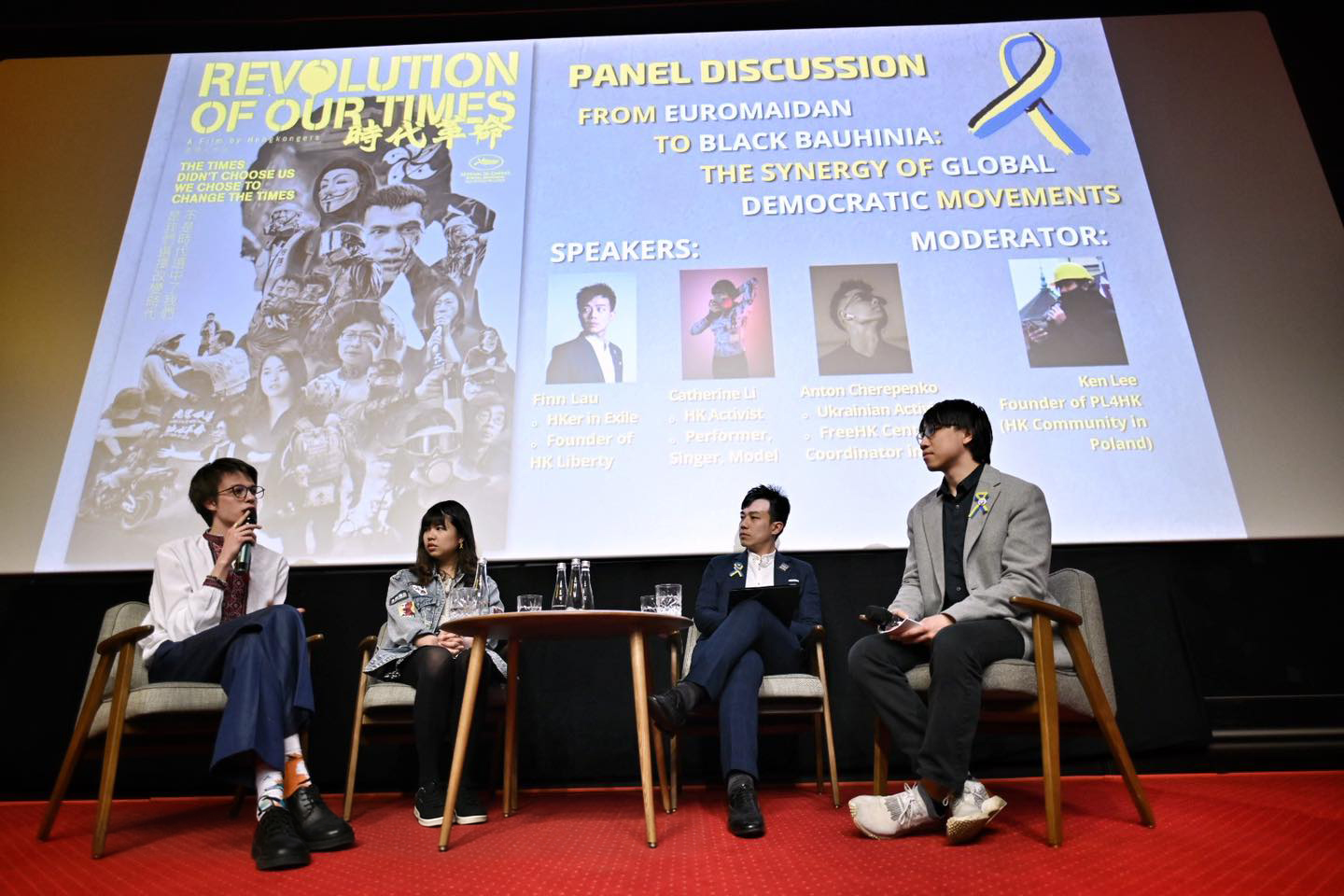
Finn Lau in the panel discussion of Revolution of Our Times in Poland, April 2022

On 5 October 2020, Lau publicised his real identity in a video, as he was only previously known by his online alias "I want Lam Chau". He also announced that he will split the "Hong Kong Liberty" team and "Stand with Hong Kong" team, and continue to lead the former. The two organisations will operate separately with different focuses. He stated that his future work to liberate Hong Kong will revolve around four axes:

1. To act as an intermediary between activist groups, frontline support workers in Hong Kong, foreign government, and overseas lawmakers
2. To perfect the doctrine of Lam Chau and lobby the international community against the CCP
3. To push for Hong Kong's autonomy under international jurisdiction like the UN, G7, or D10. And to push the British government to open up the disputes on the Sino-British Joint Declaration at the International Court of Justice.
4. To join forces with international allies to push for the right of national self-determination as a basic human right, starting with formally engaging with the UNPO.

Lau revealed that he had been assaulted by a gang of three people in London in late 2020, and believed that the attack had been politically motivated.

In April 2021, Lau announced that he would take a break from his surveyor career for "at least one or two years" and become a full-time political activist focusing on Hong Kong issues.
