= National People's Congress decision on Hong Kong national security legislation =

2020 Chinese congressional resolution

Decision on Hong Kong national security legislation

National People's Congress
- Long title: Decision of the National People's Congress on Establishing and Improving the Legal System and Enforcement Mechanisms for the Hong Kong Special Administrative Region to Safeguard National Security
- Territorial extent: People's Republic of China (including Hong Kong)
- Passed by: National People's Congress
- Passed: 28 May 2020

Legislative history
- Introduced by: Standing Committee of the National People's Congress
- Introduced: 21 May 2020

Full text
- Decision of the National People's Congress on Establishing and Improving the Legal System and Enforcement Mechanisms for the Hong Kong Special Administrative Region to Safeguard National Security at Wikisource
- Status: In force

National People's Congress decision on Hong Kong national security legislation
- Simplified Chinese: 全国人民代表大会关于建立健全香港特别行政区维护国家安全的法律制度和执行机制的决定
- Traditional Chinese: 全國人民代表大會關於建立健全香港特別行政區維護國家安全的法律制度和執行機制的決定
Transcriptions
Standard Mandarin
- Hanyu Pinyin: Quánguó Rénmín Dàibiǎo Dàhuì guānyú jiànlì jiànquán Xiānggǎng Tèbié Xíngzhèngqū wéihù guójiā ānquán de fǎlǜ zhìdù hé zhíxíng jīzhì de juédìng
- Wade–Giles: Chʻüan2-kuo2 Jên2-min2 Tai4-piao3 Ta4-hui4 kuan1-yü2 chien4-li4 chien4-chʻüan2 Hsiang1-kang2 Tʻê4-pieh2 Hsing2-cheng4-chʻü1 wei2-hu4 kuo2-chia1 an1-chʻüan2 tê fa3-lü4 chih4-tu4 ho2 chih2-hsing2 chi1-chih4 tê chüeh2-ting4
Yue: Cantonese
- Jyutping: cyun4 gwok3 jan4 man4 doi6 biu2 daai6 wui6*2 gwaan1 jyu1 gin3 laap6 gin6 cyun4 hoeng1 gong2 dak6 bit6 hang4 zing3 keoi1 wai4 wu6 gwok3 gaa1 on1 cyun4 dik1 faat3 leot6 zai3 dou6 wo4 zap1 hang4 gei1 zai3 dik1 kyut3 ding6

The Decision of the National People's Congress on Establishing and Improving the Legal System and Enforcement Mechanisms for the Hong Kong Special Administrative Region to Safeguard National Security is a congressional resolution passed by the third session of the 13th National People's Congress on 28 May 2020. This resolution authorises the National People's Congress Standing Committee to promulgate a national security law in Hong Kong.

According to the decision, the proposed national security law seeks to prevent external interference in Hong Kong's affairs, criminalise acts that threaten national security such as subversion and secession, allow the State Council of the People's Republic of China to establish a national security agency in Hong Kong when necessary and require the Chief Executive to send the central government periodic reports on national security.

The pan-democratic camp, legal professionals, human rights organisations and politicians abroad have criticised the decision as a threat to the "one country, two systems" principle, the rule of law and civil liberties. In late May 2020, Chinese diplomat Xie Feng said that the laws would only target a minority of "troublemakers" who had endangered Chinese national security. Around the same time, Hong Kong Secretary for Security John Lee said regarding the Hong Kong situation that “terrorism is growing” and calls for Hong Kong independence had become more frequent, which necessitated the bill. Several Hong Kong government officials strove to reassure investors, with Financial Secretary Paul Chan writing on his blog that any harm to investor confidence was due to "misunderstanding" of the law.

== Background and legal authority ==
The Hong Kong government in 2003 attempted to enact the National Security (Legislative Provisions) Bill 2003 to comply with the requirement under Article 23 of the Basic Law that it should enact national security legislation "on its own". However, the bill was abandoned after mass demonstrations.

An extradition law amendment bill proposing to allow extradition to China was proposed in 2019, sparking the 2019–2020 Hong Kong protests, later to be withdrawn. The South China Morning Post reported that the central government of the People's Republic of China was of the view that the political climate in Hong Kong would preclude the passage of a bill under Article 23, and so resorted to enactment through the National People's Congress instead.

Unlike the National Security (Legislative Provisions) Bill 2003, an ordinary piece of legislation submitted to the Legislative Council (LegCo) to comply with the constitutional requirements of Article 23 of the Basic Law to enact laws in that connection, the law whose enactment is authorised by the decision would be enacted by inclusion in Annex III, which does not require a vote in the LegCo. The constitutionality of the inclusion of such laws in Annex III, whilst defended in a press release by the Department of Justice and by some members of the legal community, had been disputed by the Hong Kong Bar Association (HKBA).

The dispute concerns what authority Article 18(3) of the Basic Law provides to the Standing Committee (NPCSC) of the National People's Congress. Article 18(3) provides for such enactments in cases concerning defence and foreign affairs, as well as other matters outside the limits of the autonomy of the Region. The Department of Justice's press release, however, stated that "national security is outside the limits of the autonomy of the HKSAR". The HKBA responded that in view of Article 23 of the Basic Law, which requires Hong Kong inter alia to enact laws on its own to prohibit any act of treason, secession, sedition, national security is "within" the limits of Hong Kong's autonomy. The Department of Justice maintained nevertheless that Article 23 authorises national security legislation but "does not preclude" additional legislation by the Central Authorities.

== Decision details ==
The decision, that may be translated from Chinese language as "Decision of the National People's Congress on Establishing and Perfecting the Legal System and Enforcement Mechanism of the Hong Kong Special Administrative Region to Maintain National Security" (全国人民代表大会关于建立健全香港特别行政区维护国家安全的法律制度和执行机制的决定), comprises 7 articles, the Chinese text was published by state papers on 28 May 2020. Article 1 restates the importance of one country, two systems and the rule of law, and states that the "state" will "complete" legal and enforcement mechanisms to preserve national security. Article 2 says that the state will stop and punish "overseas forces' use of Hong Kong" for separatist, subversive or destructive activities. Article 3 states that maintaining China's sovereignty is Hong Kong's constitutional responsibility. It further requires Hong Kong to enact national security legislation "as soon as possible", and its executive, legislature and judiciary to "stop and punish conduct endangering national security".

Article 4 requires Hong Kong to establish institutions to protect national security, and provides for a central government presence in Hong Kong to maintain national security. Article 5 requires regular reports from the Chief Executive of Hong Kong on national security. Article 6 authorises the Standing Committee of the National People's Congress to draft a national security law, and then to include it in Annex III of the Basic Law. Article 7 provides that the decision as a whole shall take effect on promulgation.

== Chronology ==
=== Decision ===
The decision to impose the new law was approved on 28 May 2020 by a vote of 2878 to 1, with 6 abstentions. The NPCSC was therefore authorised to draft the official text of a national security law, and to enact it by including it in the Annex III of the Hong Kong Basic Law; Beijing has said the process will be completed by an "early date". A draft law was submitted to the NPCSC and reviewed on its 19th session from 18 June 2020 to 20 June 2020, details of which were released by state-run Xinhua news agency on 20 June.

=== Published draft details of the preparing law ===
On 20 June 2020, after a three-day meeting of the Standing Committee – which had been tasked with preparing the new legislation –, Xinhua newspaper published draft details that the Standing Committee had elaborated: presumed settling China's security office in Hong Kong to monitor security, as well as rules about monitoring education regarding national security aspects, prime importance of China's government decisions above Hong Kong government: "If the local laws... are inconsistent with this Law, the provisions of this Law shall apply. The power to interpret this law belongs to the Standing Committee of the National People's Congress."

=== Enactment ===
On 30 June 2020, the NPCSC unanimously passed the Hong Kong national security law, which was subsequently gazetted on the same day and officially came into force.

=== Official text of the security law published ===
The details of the new legislation were kept in secret, even Hong Kong's Chief Executive Carrie Lam did not see it, until the new law was published only in Chinese language at 11 o'clock in the evening Beijing time on 30 June 2020. The new law in the Chinese language took effect immediately after publishing, the China's State paper Xinhua also supplied text, translated in English "for reference only" under title "The Law of the People’s Republic of China on Safeguarding National Security in the Hong Kong Special Administrative Region". The main articles of the new law can be paraphrased as follows:

- Chinese government has to set up security office in Hong Kong with its own personnel;
- The Hong Kong Chief Executive can designate incumbent judges to hear national security cases;
- Foreign news media and organisations are to be closely monitored;
- The Chinese government has the right to conduct trials behind closed doors in serious cases;
- Article 29 must be in effect to prevent inciting hatred against the Chinese or local government;
- Secession, subversion, terrorism and colluding with foreign countries is to be punished with imprisonment from 3 years to life;
- Serious interruption or sabotage of electronic control systems for providing and managing public services such as water, electric power, gas, transport, may be considered as terrorism.

Added details about Article 43 emerged after the meeting of the Committee for Safeguarding National Security of the Hong Kong Special Administrative Region (HKSAR), headed by Carrie Lam, and were published on 6 July 2020; the added details state that:

- Police can search a suspect's home without a warrant in case of urgency;
- Police can ban a suspect from leaving Hong Kong;
- Government can freeze assets of a suspect;
- Government can monitor the web and ask internet providers to remove information.

The same day, 6 July 2020, Facebook and WhatsApp said they suspended requests from Hong Kong Government about user data.

== Domestic responses ==
=== Protests ===
On 24 May 2020 a rally occurred to protest against the proposed security law. It was the biggest protest in Hong Kong since the beginning of the coronavirus pandemic. For the first time in two months, the police deployed tear gas in an attempt to disperse the protesters.

On 27 May 2020, protesters gathered again on the streets to protest against the proposed national security law and the national anthem bill, which underwent its second reading on that day. Demonstrations of varying scale occurred in different districts including Causeway Bay, Central, and Mong Kok. Tear gas and pepper balls were fired and 360 people were arrested that day for unauthorised assembly and other charges.

==== Analysis of the change in Hong Kong protests ====
The Guardian's China specialists Tania Branigan and Lily Kuo wrote that the protest movement in Hong Kong changed after the NPC announcement of the law, with the mood shifting to one where many Hong Kong protestors are willing and prepared to die for the cause of keeping mainland Chinese influence out, and with calls to find an impactful and permanent solution to mainland Chinese interference, rather than small-scale measures. A rare slogan, calling for complete independence rather than more control, became the unifying chant of the protests, while the concept of "laam chau" gained momentum. This is the ideology of taking Hong Kong down and dragging mainland China with it. One protestor said: "If the Chinese army comes out, we will celebrate. The entire Hong Kong business environment will collapse. If they call the military here, it would ruin Hong Kong and also mainland China's economy".

==== Crimes committed ====
On 1 July 2021, a Hong Kong police officer barely survived a knife attack from Leung Kin-fai, a Vitasoy purchasing agent and former information officer for Apple Daily. Leung later killed himself, and his suicide note expressed his hatred toward the police, opposition to the National Security Law, and intention to kill an officer. Some Hongkongers saw Leung as a martyr and offered flowers as tribute. The police officer underwent seven hours of surgery and was hospitalised for 19 days.

=== Economy and stock market ===
Losses of about 5% were recorded in on the Hang Seng Index (the worst day since 2015), and some Japanese stocks also fell. Carrie Lam denied that the losses were due to the decision, attributing them to usual "ups and downs" in the market. China has sought to assure international investors that they will not be affected. Hang Seng Index regained lost ground a week later.

=== Migration ===
Some Hong Kong citizens began looking for ways to emigrate and leave Hong Kong, feeling that the law would fundamentally damage their rights of expression and freedom. 10 times the usual number of web searches about emigration were recorded after the decision was announced. The Taiwanese government said that they would help anyone leaving Hong Kong find passage away; China threatened "all means" against Taiwan but also said violence would be a last resort.

SCMP reported that after the decision on the law, the number of Hong Kong residents speaking to estate agents about properties in the United Kingdom (UK) rose rapidly. One article compared it to the mass exodus seen before the 1997 handover, also saying that local estate agents were cutting the asking prices for Hong Kong properties to keep business. Another SCMP article noted that the British announcement of BNO extension plans likely contributed to the rise in searches for UK homes specifically, with properties in London, Birmingham and Manchester being especially desirable. It quoted an estate agent who said that the demand for UK properties had, over a few days, reached where it was at its peak during the 2019 protests and before the pandemic.

Immigration agencies in Hong Kong also saw a jump in inquiries, with one company seeing "a four to fivefold increase in cases", citing a new urgency, with people asking for the visa that will be approved the fastest. Estate agencies report an increase in interest in Singapore for high net worth individuals, with families increasingly asking about the UK, Australia, and Canada.

=== Statements ===
==== Supporters ====
Chief Executive Carrie Lam said that the Hong Kong government would fully cooperate with Beijing. Andrew Leung, the President of the LegCo, and Martin Liao, pro-establishment LegCo convener, also expressed support. Lam said that any national security law enacted would not affect the "legitimate rights and freedoms" of Hong Kong people, and said that its enactment by inclusion in Annex III of the Basic Law (see above) was entirely legitimate.

Paul Kwong the Archbishop and Primate of the Hong Kong Sheng Kung Hui (the Anglican province of Hong Kong), and Venerable Master Kuan Yun, the president of the Hong Kong Buddhist Association, called the decision a necessary move.

Chen Daoxiang, the PLA commander in Hong Kong, said that his garrison would safeguard "national sovereignty and development interests", and that the national security law to be drafted and enacted under the decision was "conducive to deter separatist forces and external intervention".

The New York Times reported that state media painted laws proposed by the decision as "necessary to protect the rule of the Communist Party" and were strongly supportive of the law.

==== Opponents ====
The Hong Kong Bar Association issued a statement raising two concerns as to the nature of the law proposed by the decision. First, the association suggested that consultation was inadequate and that there was no guarantee that any eventual law would comply with the International Covenant on Civil and Political Rights, which is "entrenched in the Basic Law". Second, the presence of mainland Chinese security organs mooted by Article 4 of the Decision did not make clear whether their agents would be required to comply with Hong Kong law, or how their deployment could be compatible with Article 22(1) of the Basic Law, which proscribes interference in affairs administered by the HKSAR 'on its own'.

On 6 June 2020, 17 out 18 District Councils unprecedentedly held a joint meeting to discuss the legislation of the national security law, with 329 out of 458 councillors attending. All 17 District Councils passed the motion to demand the withdrawal of the national security law. The convener Clarisse Yeung, who is also the chairwoman of the Wan Chai District Council, stated that the result of the meeting reflects the real public opinion in Hong Kong.

Several members of the pan-democratic camp expressed concern. Lee Cheuk-yan said that the law could be used as an arbitrary "one-size-fits-all" charge against activists, citing Nobel Peace Prize laureate Liu Xiaobo's prison sentence of 11 years for "inciting subversion". Tanya Chan, the convener of pro-democratic camp, commented that the drafted decision confirmed that Hong Kong is changing from "One country, Two systems" to "One country, One system", saying that the Chinese government is intervening in Hong Kong matters in all aspects. Social activist Joshua Wong said that China was trying to sever the connections of Hong Kong with the international community. Jimmy Sham, convener of the Civil Human Rights Front, also attacked the law, comparing it to a "nuclear weapon".

== International responses ==
Among other responses, the United States prominently announced that it would revoke Hong Kong's special trade status on 27 May. Pompeo called the NPCSC decision the "latest in a series of actions that fundamentally undermine Hong Kong's autonomy and freedoms".

On 19 June 2020, the European Parliament adopted a resolution condemning Beijing's introduction of the national security legislation in Hong Kong, and called for the finalizsation of the EU Global Human Rights Sanctions Mechanism, which could be used to impose Magnitsky-style sanctions, for example assets freezing, on Chinese officials responsible for the national security legislation.

== See also ==
- Anti-Secession Law, similar law regarding Taiwan
- 2014 NPCSC Decision on Hong Kong
- National People's Congress
- Standing Committee of the National People's Congress
- Hong Kong Basic Law
- Hong Kong Basic Law Article 23
- National Security (Legislative Provisions) Bill 2003
- Emergency Regulations Ordinance
