= Lam chau (doctrine) =

Hong Kong slang referring to mutual assured destruction

- Traditional Chinese: 攬炒
- Simplified Chinese: 揽炒
Transcriptions
Standard Mandarin
- Hanyu Pinyin: lǎnchǎo
Yue: Cantonese
- Jyutping: laam5-2 caau2

Lam chau, laam chau, or laam caau (Chinese: 攬炒; Jyutping: laam5-2 caau2; lit. 'embrace fry'), or burnism, is a Hong Kong Cantonese term referring to a concept of mutual assured destruction. The term was picked up by the 2019–2020 Hong Kong protesters as a doctrine against the ruling Chinese Communist Party (CCP).

== Etymology ==
The Hong Kong Cantonese phrase “lam chau” (攬炒) literally means 'embrace fry', which journalist and City, University of London lecturer Yuen Chan explained as meaning "if I'm gonna fry, I'm gonna drag you in with me", comparing it to the English language idiom "if we burn, you burn with us". Comparisons of the term to the English phrase also drew comparisons to the novel and film series The Hunger Games, where a longer phrase, "fire is catching and if we burn, you burn with us", is used as a mark of the revolution overturning the dystopian society. This English phrase has also been used by pro-independence protestors, and was used as the title of a 2020 documentary about the protests. Taiwanese magazine Commonwealth also suggested a literal translation of 攬炒 as the Chinese language idiom "jade and stone burning together" (玉石俱焚).

== Use ==
Popularized by activist Finn Lau, the term is most prominently used by Hong Kong scorched earth protesters to promote the "burn with us" strategy of achieving Hong Kong liberation from the CCP rule. They call for international sanctions intending to damage Hong Kong financially, which would moreover damage the economy of Mainland China, and undertake protest actions that aim to see retaliation that damages both Hong Kong and China at large. One member of the group said that it is a doctrine of "phoenixism" (scorched-earth defense), saying that Hong Kong will burn but rise again.

Other protesters have said that if Beijing feels a threat to their economy coming, they will give the Hong Kong protesters what they want so as to placate them and not receive the financial implications. After the Hong Kong national security law was enacted by China at the end of June 2020, the LA Times reported that the idea of lam chau was "radical" when it emerged in the protest movement in 2019, but "is becoming a reality [...] accelerating each day as China and the U.S. stoke the flames of a conflict that looks set to explode in Hong Kong". In June 2020, after the announcement of the security law, The Daily Beast reported that the term was being used as graffiti and a protest call, and that the ideology of it was being seen as a final resort.

It is also used more broadly to refer to the idea of sanctions against Hong Kong bringing down China in general. Nonviolent Hong Kong protest advocate and law professor at the University of Hong Kong Benny Tai had written in April 2020 that he then saw lam chau as inevitable but thought it would take years, expecting Beijing to start by restricting freedoms slowly before bringing in a national security law and causing international sanctions themselves; in May 2020, when the Chinese government approved a decision allowing them to make the security law, he wrote that "Beijing has skipped straight to the endgame" and that "the CPC [is] speeding up laam chau".

== Reactions ==
The Chinese Hong Kong Liaison Office responded negatively to the use of the term, telling protesters they "will only destroy Hong Kong". Chris Patten, the last Governor of Hong Kong before the UK handed the territory over to China, also criticised it. Patten supports Hong Kong protesters but felt that wanting to bring destruction "would only make the situation worse". Willy Lam of the Chinese University of Hong Kong described it as "a lose-lose situation for everyone".

After the Liaison Office publicly denounced the doctrine, it spread more. To oppose this, pro-Beijing groups in Hong Kong tried to push an opposite idea and started using the phrase "if you burn, you burn with them" to suggest the lam chau protesters were only hurting themselves. Hong Kong political scholar Brian Wong also argued, in a piece published in The Diplomat in September 2019, that lam chau is dangerous; he wrote that the protesters advocating it do not have enough experience of Mainland China to see the differences between Hong Kong and Mainland China and recognise that Beijing sees the territory as replaceable.
