= Brian C. H. Fong =

Hong Kong political scholar

- 方志恒
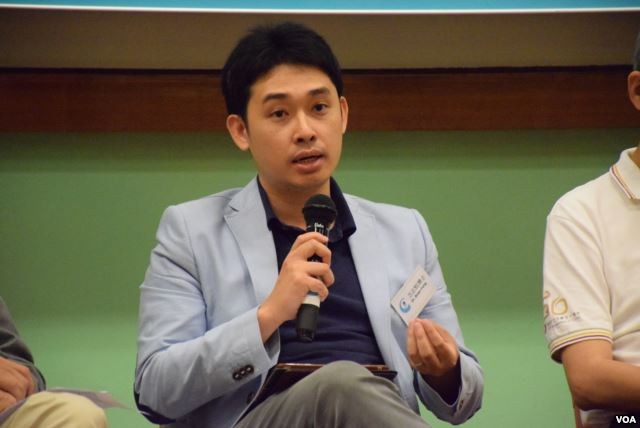
- Fong in 2015
- Born: December 5, 1978 (age 47); Hong Kong

Academic background
- Education: CUHK; CityU

Brian C. H. Fong (Chinese: 方志恒, born on 5 December 1978) is a Hong Kong political scholar. He is currently Professor in the College of Social Sciences at National Sun Yat-sen University, Taiwan. He found and led several civil society organizations in Hong Kong.

== Academic career ==
Brian C.H. Fong was graduated from the Department of Government and Public Administration at the Chinese University of Hong Kong. After graduation, he joined the Hong Kong Government as executive officer and subsequently left the civil service for academia in 2007. He was then a full-time Lecturer at the Community College of City University and obtained his doctoral degree at the Department of Public Policy of the City University of Hong Kong in 2012.

After obtaining his doctoral degree, Fong joined the Department of Asian and Policy Studies of the Education University of Hong Kong in 2013 as assistant professor. In 2015, Fong and Lui Tai-lok co-found the Academy of Hong Kong Studies, which is the first, and so far only, academy dedicated to fostering Hong Kong Studies within local tertiary institutions. Later Fong was promoted to associate professor and appointed as the associate director of the Academy of Hong Kong Studies. In August 2022, Fong took up the position of Professor in the College of Social Sciences at National Sun Yat-sen University, Taiwan.

== Social participation ==
Brian C.H. Fong focuses on studying Hong Kong's governance and constitutional reform, and he keeps participating in related advocacies.

He served as the vice chairman of SynergyNet from 2010 to 2019, publishing a number of research reports such as Review of the Governance Performance of the HKSAR Government and Review of Hong Kong's Public Finances.

After the Umbrella Movement, there was a rise of localist discourse. Fong edited two Chinese book volumes, namely the Theory of Reforming Hong Kong I in 2015 and the Theory of Reforming Hong Kong II in 2017.

Fong found several civil society organizations in Hong Kong. In 2015, Fong established the Project Civil Autonomy, a crowdsourcing platform for raising resources for civil society groups. In August 2017, Fong and several scholars setup the Progressive Scholars Group, which is a scholars network aiming at promoting “academic autonomy and a strong civil society” for Hong Kong. In January 2018, Fong found the Hong Kong Business Association of Sustainable Economy (HKBASE), an enterprise network which aims at promoting “a strong and sustainable economy for Hong Kong”.

Fong was once appointed to several government boards and committees in Hong Kong, including Part-time Member of Central Policy Unit of HKSAR Government (From January 2011 to December 2012) and Member of Subsidised Housing Committee of Housing Authority (From April 2014 to April 2018).

== Publications ==
=== Research book or monograph (editor) ===
- Fong, B. C. H. with Wu, J. M. and Nathan, A. J. (2020). China's Influence and the Centre-periphery Tug of War in Hong Kong, Taiwan and Indo-Pacific. London: Routledge.
- Fong, B. C. H. and Lui, T. L. (2018). Hong Kong: 20 Years After the Handover --- Emerging Social and Institutional Fractures After 1997. Basingstoke: Palgrave Macmillan.

=== Research book or monograph (author) ===
- Brian C.H. Fong (2023). Hong Kong Politics: In Search of Autonomy, Democracy and Governance. Basingstoke: Palgrave Macmillan.
- Brian C.H. Fong (2021). Hong Kong Public Finance: An Integrated Approach for Studying Budgetary Politics. Basingstoke: Palgrave Macmillan.
- Brian C.H. Fong (2014). Hong Kong's Governance Under Chinese Sovereignty: The Failure of the State-business Alliance After 1997. Abingdon, Oxon: Routledge.
