= Book Punch =

Independent book store in Hong Kong

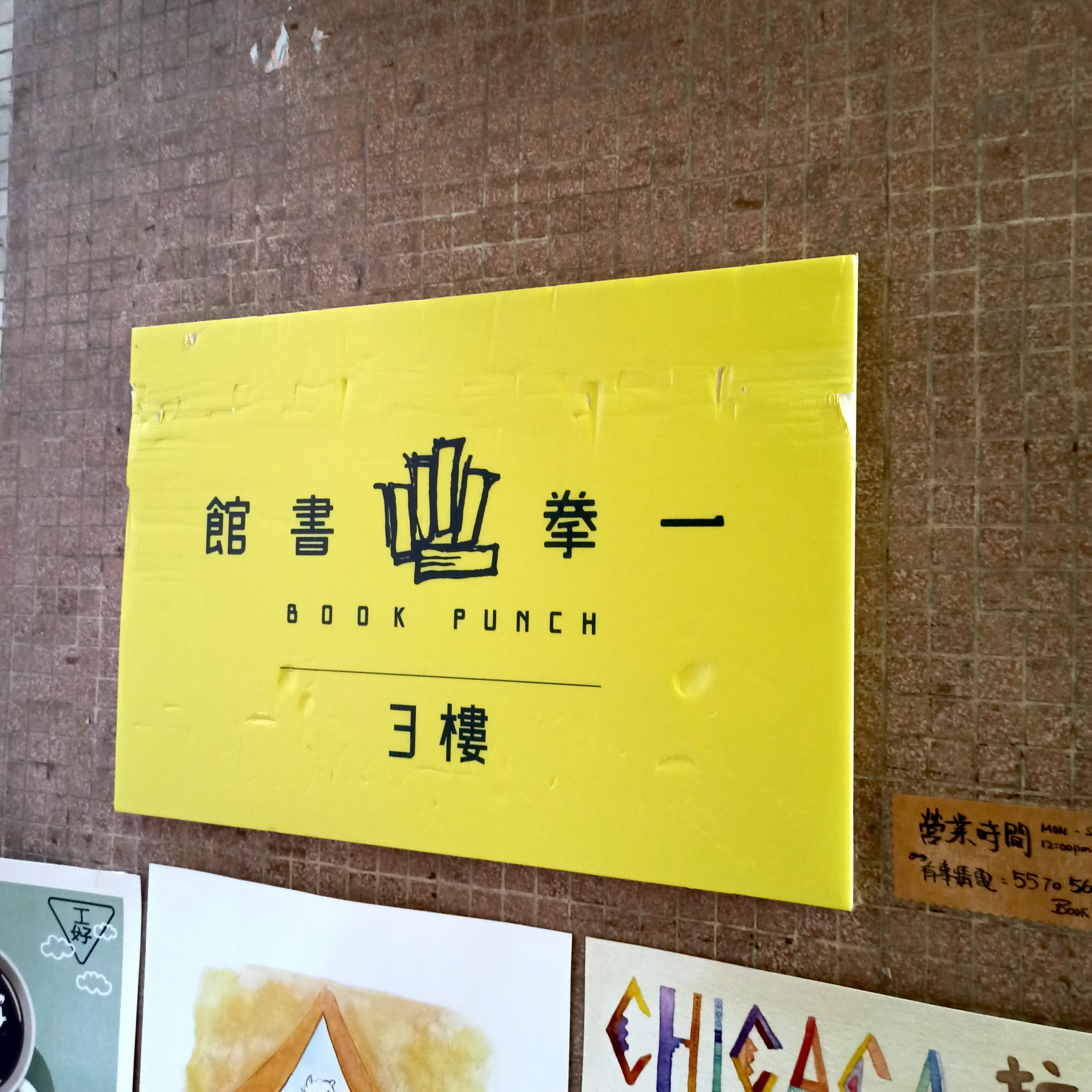

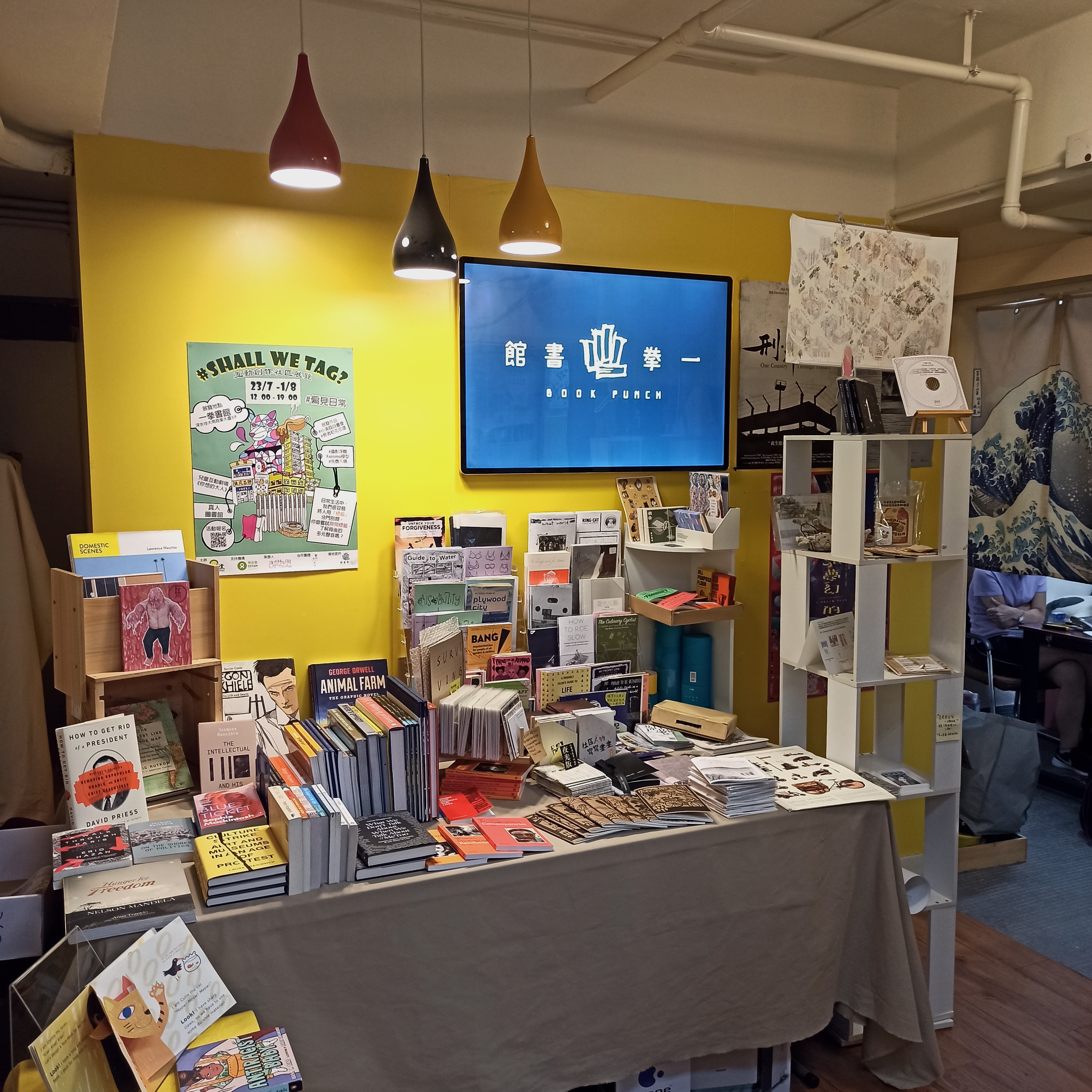
- Interior in July 2021
- Founded: October 1, 2020; 5 years ago
- Founder: Pong Yat-ming
- Headquarters: 3/F, 169-171 Tai Nan Street, Sham Shui Po, Hong Kong

Book Punch (Chinese: 一拳書館) is an independent book store in Sham Shui Po, Hong Kong. The bookstore's name was inspired by the Japanese manga One-Punch Man. Founded by Pong Yat-ming on 10 September 2020, its motto is "一拳驚醒讀書人", meaning "one punch to awaken readers", with the aim of using books to help the public realize that reading is not merely an activity for literary scholars and intellectuals.

== History ==
The founder of Book Punch, Pong Yat-ming, studied film in his early years. After graduation, he worked in education before moving into social work. He previously launched the "One Year Without Supporting Major Property Developers" campaign, using consumer action to oppose the dominance of large developers in various aspects of daily life. In 2020, the continued social impact of the 2019 Anti-ELAB movement and the COVID-19 pandemic, together with the removal of certain books from public libraries and major bookstores, revisions to textbook content, and the removal of George Orwell's Animal Farm and Nineteen Eighty-Four from some schools in mainland China, led Pang to view these developments as a form of "silent suppression" of social discourse. This experience indirectly motivated him to open a bookstore.

The idea for Book Punch took shape when Pang visited an exhibition at Form Society (合舍) on Tai Nan Street, Sham Shui Po, and noticed a nearby vacant unit for rent. Although the COVID-19 pandemic delayed negotiations, he eventually reached an agreement with the landlord on the lease and rent. Meanwhile, he created an Excel spreadsheet to plan the books he hoped to sell. Despite reaching out to various publishers through his personal network, responses were generally limited, with some publishers not replying. The store also contacted independent publishers in Taiwan and North America, while some self-published authors approached the bookstore to request consignment sales.

After renovations, Pang announced on social media on 10 September 2020, that he would establish Book Punch in Sham Shui Po. The store began a 10-day trial operation on 18 September and officially opened on 1 October 2020.

In January 2021, Book Punch was invited by the C.C. Wu Cultural & Education Foundation Fund (伍集成文化教育基金) to collaborate with a Hong Kong publisher on a one-month "Independent Small Book Fair" at C.C.Wu Building in Wan Chai. In July 2021, the bookstore participated as a bookstall vendor in the "Independent Publishing Mini Book Fair" held at Foo Tak Building, alongside other independent bookstores including jisaam.books and Mount Zero Bookstore.

== Incidents ==
On 22 July 2021, the National Security Department of the Hong Kong Police Force arrested five members of the General Union of Hong Kong Speech Therapists for allegedly publishing picture books that "inciting hatred." Between 2020 and 2021, the union had printed three children’s books—Guardians of the Sheep Village, 12 Warriors of the Sheep Village, and Scavengers of the Sheep Village—which were distributed at 18 shops, including Book Punch. In June 2021, the bookstore also hosted a parent-child reading session featuring the series. The store manager told the media that the books had been printed in small quantities and had already been fully distributed by the store, while the person in charge was overseas at the time and would not comment further.

On 2 September 2022, Book Punch held a sake-themed reading event, charging participants HK$350 to enjoy sake at the bookstore. Pang Yat-ming was subsequently prosecuted for selling alcoholic beverages without a license and for violating COVID-19-related regulations governing catering businesses, and was fined HK$12,000. WKCC864/2023

In April 2025, Book Punch held a Spanish-language interest class that allegedly violated the Education Ordinance. In June, the bookstore also hosted an unlicensed stand-up comedy performance and was charged with operating an unlicensed place of public entertainment. On 10 April, 2026, the bookstore was convicted and was fined HK$32,000.

In March 2026, Pang Yat-ming and three female employees were arrested by the National Security Department for allegedly violating Article 24 of the Safeguarding National Security Ordinance, concerning the offense of “knowingly selling publications with seditious intent.” The department searched Book Punch the same day and seized a number of books it deemed to have seditious intent, including a biography of Jimmy Lai.
