= Stand with Hong Kong =

Hong Kong political organisation

- 重光團隊
- Formation: 2019
- Founders: A group of anonymous Hongkongers
- Purpose: Fighting for democracy and freedom for Hong Kong
- Website: https://standwithhk.org/

Stand with Hong Kong ("SWHK"), an abbreviation of the official name "Fight for Freedom. Stand with Hong Kong.", is an independent grassroot political organisation dedicated to fighting for freedom of Hong Kong. Co-founded during the 2019-20 Hong Kong protests by a group of anonymous Hongkongers worldwide, it aims to rally the international community to support Hongkongers in their fight for democracy. Some of its major campaigns include a global rally across 15 countries in August 2019 and a sanction report in November 2019 in response to the Hong Kong Human Rights and Democracy Act. In 2025, Stand with Hong Kong EU was registered in Sweden.

== Campaigns ==
In July 2019, a group of anonymous volunteers around the world organised a crowdfunding campaign and founded Stand with Hong Kong to advertise on street ads in the UK and on multiple major UK newspapers including the Guardian, the Evening Standard, the Spectator, and the New Statesman, accusing in the advertisement that the CCP was violating the Sino-British Joint Declaration. In August, the Stand with Hong Kong team, together with another protester organisation named G20 team, crowd-funded to advertise on foreign newspapers in multiple countries including Japan, South Korea, America, Canada, the Netherlands, Spain, Germany, France, Switzerland, and Denmark, in order to expose how the Hong Kong government were oppressing the dissidents in Hong Kong.

In mid-2019, the team wrote to the United Nations and International Amnesty to accuse the Hong Kong Police Force of violating the International Bill of Human Rights in the 12 June 2019 Hong Kong protest. Furthermore, the team has also written to the EU requesting it to impose an arms embargo on Hong Kong.

On 16 August 2019, the team collaborated with several student unions of higher education institutions to host a campaign named “Stand With Hong Kong, Power to the People Rally”, aiming to call the UK’s attention to China’s violation of the Sino-British Joint Declaration and to urge the US to pass the Hong Kong Human Rights and Democracy Act.

The phrase “Fight for freedom. Stand with Hong Kong.” gained global attention in October 2019 after it was tweeted by Houston Rockets general manager Daryl Morey in support of the 2019–20 Hong Kong protests. The slogan had already been widely used by pro-democracy supporters internationally and is distinct from the organisation itself.

In late 2019, Stand with Hong Kong hosted a seminar in Japan displaying the tear gas shells and rubber bullets used by the HK Police Force in order to push for a Japanese version of the Hong Kong Human Rights and Democracy Act.

After the US legislated the Hong Kong Human Rights and Democracy Act in November 2019, Stand with Hong Kong collaborated with the Hong Kong Higher Institutions International Affairs Delegation to compile a sanction report, listing the names of about 140 government officials and pro-China personnel who abused human rights in Hong Kong, along with detailed accounts of their actions.

On 19 January 2020, Stand with Hong Kong worked together with activist Ventus Lau to launch a global rally in 22 cities across 12 countries including the US, the UK, and Australia, urging their governments to impose sanctions on Hong Kong in order to pressure the Hong Kong government.

In May 2020, the team put forward a crowd-funding proposal with a target budget of US$1,750,000, intending to launch lobbying campaigns in different countries and to publish advertisements to counter the propaganda spread by the Hong Kong government. The team emphasised that its members would not take any remuneration or salaries and that the budget will be used only for the necessary travelling, advertisements, and promotion expenses.

In 2024, the EU division worked with a local Swedish grassroots organisations to organise the inauguration of the 'Network in Riksdagen for Freedom of Speech and Democracy in Hong Kong', a cross-party parliamentary group for Hong Kong. This network has raised questions in parliament on Hong Kong and aided in advocating for democratic rights in Hong Kong.

In December 2025, Stand with Hong Kong EU published its sanctions submission to the European Union, recommending sanctions against 14 individuals responsible for a number of human rights violations committed during the 2019 - 2020 Hong Kong Protests. These recommendations were echoed soon after in a resolution adopted by the European Parliament in the days prior to the sentencing of Jimmy Lai.
