= Emily Feng =

American journalist

- Born: 1993 (age 32–33)
- Citizenship: United States
- Education: Duke University (BA)
- Occupations: Journalist, author
- Organization: NPR (2019–present)
- Awards: Shorenstein Journalism Award (2022)

Emily Feng (simplified Chinese: 冯哲芸; traditional Chinese: 馮哲芸; pinyin: Féng Zhéyún) is an American journalist and author who focuses on politics and human rights in China and travels frequently to conflicts and hotspots around the world.

== Early life and education ==
Feng was born and raised in Bethany, Connecticut, to Chinese parents. She says she considers herself Chinese and American in identity, "and that connection and those people and that world will always be accessible whether or not I am in China." Feng studied Public Policy and Asian and Middle Eastern Studies at Duke University and graduated in 2015.

== Journalism career ==
Feng is a White House reporter for NPR and previously served as an international correspondent for NPR from 2019 to 2024, based in Beijing and Taipei. Her work in Taiwan was among a package awarded a citation from the Overseas Press Club in 2025. Before joining NPR, she was a Beijing correspondent for the Financial Times.

Feng has covered semiconductors, Chinese surveillance of Uyghurs, and the coronavirus epidemic in China. Her work uncovering the contours of China's crackdown in Xinjiang won a Human Rights Press Award in 2021. She is known for her investigations across Asia and the Middle East.

She has also done reporting in conflict zones around the world, including the Middle East, Europe, and Asia. In 2025, she moved to Washington, D.C., for NPR, where she covers foreign policy and U.S.-China relations.

In 2022, Feng received the 2022 Shorenstein Journalism Award for her work in the Asia-Pacific. In 2023, Feng won the Daniel Schorr Journalism Prize for her reporting on Uyghur families in China.

In 2025, Feng published Let Only Red Flowers Bloom, a book that explores questions of identity in modern China under the general secretaryship of Xi Jinping. She said she wrote it because "she wanted to help people feel what it's like to live in their world, because that's what I've lost since leaving China — and, I think, what we've all lost now that there are fewer reporters on the ground in mainland China." In July 2026, Let Only Red Flowers Bloom was reportedly seized as "seditious material" by Hong Kong customs and prompted police raids on two independent book stores in Hong Kong, in which five bookstore employees were arrested under a National Security Law. The book's Chinese version quickly became a bestseller, with its publisher in Taiwan announcing emergency re-prints to meet demand.

== Awards and recognition ==
- 2024 Overseas Press Club Award Lowell Thomas Award citation, for NPR stories on Taiwan
- 2023 Daniel Schorr Award for a podcast series on Uyghurs
- 2022 Shorenstein Award for stories on the Asia Pacific
- 2021 Gracie Award for crisis coverage/breaking news during China's coronavirus pandemic
- 2021 Livingston Award finalist for international reporting

== Books ==
- Let Only Red Flowers Bloom (2025)
- Our Hearts Burned For Home: Uyghur Militants in Syria’s Civil War. Columbia Global Reports. October 13, 2026. ISBN 978-1967190188.
