= UKSCblog =

Blog covering the Supreme Court of the United Kingdom

- Website type: Blog
- Owner: Olswang
- Creators: Dan Tench, Ned Beale, Oliver Gayner, Hugh Tomlinson QC, Matthew Ryder and Anthony Fairclough (Editors)
- Website: ukscblog.com
- Commercial: No
- Launched: 2009
- Current status: Inactive

UKSCblog (The United Kingdom Supreme Court blog) is a law blog dedicated to the Supreme Court of the United Kingdom. The blog is based on the SCOTUSblog in the US which provides commentary and information about the United States Supreme Court.

== History ==
UKSCblog was created by, amongst others, Hugh Tomlinson QC of Matrix Chambers and Dan Tench, Head of Judicial Review and Public Law at law firm Olswang.

The establishment of the Supreme Court marks an important constitutional change for the UK, and to mark this development, the UKSC Blog has been set up to provide commentary on the court and its judgments.

== Recognition ==
Following the blog's launch on 1 October 2009, The Times called it an "exciting development", while the BBC noted that "one group of influential solicitors and barristers is launching a blog to monitor the Supreme Court's decision making". City AM has also commented on the blog.

== See also ==
- TaxProf Blog
