= Hugh Tomlinson =

English lawyer

Hugh Tomlinson KC
- Born: Hugh Richard Edward Tomlinson; January 1954 (age 72); Leeds, England
- Education: Balliol College, University of Oxford
- Occupation: Barrister

Hugh Richard Edward Tomlinson KC (born January 1954 in Leeds) is a barrister in England and Wales, an English translator of the philosopher Gilles Deleuze and a founding member of Matrix Chambers. He is a specialist in media and information law including defamation, confidence, privacy and data protection.

He acted in the litigation that sought the full disclosure of UK MP's parliamentary expenses and in the Phone hacking scandal case. He is known for his privacy work for celebrities who have included Lily Allen, David Beckham and Victoria Beckham, Rio Ferdinand, Ashley Cole, Ryan Giggs, as well as others such as retired banker (and ex-knight) Fred Goodwin and King Charles III. He is a visiting professor at the London School of Economics. He has been accused, in Parliament, of working on behalf of corrupt Russian clients to silence their critics.

== Early life ==
Tomlinson was born and grew up in a working-class area of Woodhouse in Leeds, West Yorkshire. After winning a place at Leeds Grammar School he went on to Balliol College, Oxford where he earned the top first in the University in PPE. After Oxford he continued his philosophical studies at the University of Sussex and in 1977 went to the University of Paris VIII, at the time notorious for its radical philosophy department. Tomlinson met the philosopher Gilles Deleuze there and went on to translate eight of his books.

== Legal career ==
In 1984 he joined New Court Chambers and according to Carman’s biographer, Dominic Carman, Tomlinson "made a deep impression" on George Carman who was then head of chambers. Carman regarded him as his star performer, insisting that he become his junior in the two Branson defamation cases - the British Airways "dirty tricks" campaign against Virgin Atlantic, and the case involving an alleged attempt to bribe Richard Branson by the head of the lottery company GTECH S.p.A.

In 2000 he became a founder member of Matrix Chambers. Other founding members included Cherie Booth KC, Lord Brennan KC, James Crawford SC, Professor Conor Gearty, Ben Emmerson KC, Lord Ken Macdonald KC, Clare Montgomery KC, Helen Mountfield KC, Tim Owen KC and Philippe Sands KC.

Tomlinson has had a very broad practice at the Bar. In addition to his work in privacy and media law he been instructed in public law, criminal law and commercial cases. His cases range from substantial Chancery Division cases such as that relating to Marlborough Fine Art and the Francis Bacon Estate to representing the DPP in the Criminal Court of Appeal in the first application on the changed law on double jeopardy.

In 2007 Tomlinson successfully represented Lord Baker a former Environment Secretary in a Freedom of Information request against John Prescott, the then Secretary of State for the Environment, Transport and the Regions. The Information Tribunal ruled that civil servants' advice to ministers on major planning decisions should be disclosed to anyone who asks for it once the decision is taken.

He represented Prince Charles in preventing the publication of the Prince’s Hong Kong travel diaries and claimed that any arguments that the journals should be published in the public interest were "far-fetched". He was the leading barrister in the campaign to force the public release of information relating to MPs' expenses.

Tomlinson is known as a "super injunction" specialist protecting celebrities from the disclosure of "private" information but in accordance with the bar’s taxi rank principle he works on both sides of this legal divide. In the case where England football captain John Terry went to court to protect details of a relationship with Vanessa Perroncel, (the ex-girlfriend of his England team-mate Wayne Bridge) Tomlinson represented Associated Newspapers. He also represented Jeremy Clarkson’s ex-wife Alex Hall where Clarkson was seeking (but subsequently dropped) efforts to prevent Hall from claiming that they had had an affair during his subsequent marriage. In Ntuli v Donald he again acted for the Defendant, Ntuli, a former partner of Take That’s Howard Donald, who had obtained a "super-injunction" to prevent her revealing details of their relationship (and preventing the reporting of the existence of the injunction itself). This was the first appeal against a "super-injunction". It was removed by the Court of Appeal who allowed the proceedings to be reported and Donald and Ntuli to be named. Tomlinson successfully represented the publisher HarperCollins when the BBC sought to prevent a publication revealing the identity of Top Gear’s secret racing-driver, The Stig.

Tomlinson represented Robert Murat in the defamation action against numerous British newspapers. Murat, an Anglo Portuguese local seeking to help was falsely accused by the British press of being involved in the disappearance of the three-year-old Madeleine McCann. Tomlinson also represented Christopher Jefferies, the retired Bristol school teacher and landlord of murder victim Joanna Yeates, over the lurid and malicious press coverage of Jefferies during the case. In both cases substantial damages were received.

In the News of the world phone-hacking scandal Tomlinson acted for Sienna Miller whose case led to the final admission by the News of the World that more than one journalist was involved in the hacking. He was the lead counsel for the claimants in the first and second rounds of the Mobile Telephone Voicemail Interception Litigation against the News of the World. His other phone-hacking clients include Jude Law, Ulrika Jonsson, Ashley Cole, Ryan Giggs, Pete Doherty, Leslie Ash, Lee Chapman, Chris Bryant MP, Simon Hughes MP, Brian Paddick, Tessa Jowell MP, John Prescott and Neil and Glenys Kinnock. He also acted in the phone hacking judicial review of the Metropolitan police.

In 2014 Tomlinson represented Amnesty International in the Investigatory Powers Tribunal in a case in which the Security Services were forced to concede that their arrangements for dealing with legally privileged material were unlawful and accepted that Amnesty’s communications had been illegally intercepted. He acted for Amnesty International in its subsequent challenge to the legality of the bulk interception of communications by UK intelligence agencies in the European Court of Human Rights.

Tomlinson represented the pianist James Rhodes in his successful 2015 appeal to the Supreme Court which led to the overturning of an injunction to prevent the publication of his autobiography, Instrumental. In 2017, Tomlinson represented the entertainer Michael Barrymore in his successful claim for wrongful arrest against the Essex Police.

== Blogging and Editing ==
Tomlinson is an active blogger. He represented Nightjack the police blogger whom The Times sought (successfully) to name and expose. He is a founding editor of the United Kingdom Supreme Court blog.

== Publications ==
- Lender Claims, with T Grant (Sweet & Maxwell, 2010)
- The Law of Human Rights, with R Clayton, (Oxford University Press, 2nd Edition, 2009)
- ‘Implications for the Private Sector’ in P Carey and M Turle eds, Freedom of Information Handbook (2nd Edn, Law Society, 2008)
- Civil Actions Against the Police, with R Clayton (Sweet & Maxwell, 3rd Edition, 2004)
- Online Publication Claims: A practical guide, with G Vassall-Adams (Matrix Chambers, 2017).

=== Translations of Gilles Deleuze ===
- Gilles Deleuze (2006). Nietzsche and Philosophy (Reprint. ed.). London: Continuum. ISBN 0-8264-9075-1.
- Gilles Deleuze (with Barbara Habberjam) (1984). Kant's Critical Philosophy : the doctrine of the faculties (4. printing. ed.). Minneapolis: University of Minnesota Press. ISBN 0-8166-1436-9.
- Gilles Deleuze (with Barbara Habberjam) (1991). Bergsonism (1. paperback ed., [Nachdr.] ed.). New York: Zone Books. ISBN 978-0-942299-07-6.
- Gilles Deleuze and Félix Guattari (with Graham Burchill) (2003). What is Philosophy? (2. impression. ed.). London: Verso. ISBN 978-0-86091-686-4.
- Gilles Deleuze and Claire Parnet (with Barbara Habberjam) (1987). Dialogues. New York: Columbia University Press. ISBN 0-231-06600-7.
- Gilles Deleuze and Claire Parnet (with Barbara Habberjam) (2006). Dialogues II (2nd ed.). London: Continuum. ISBN 0-8264-9077-8.
- Gilles Deleuze (with Barbara Habberjam) (1986). Cinema 1: the movement-image ([Online-Ausg.]. ed.). Minneapolis: University of Minnesota. ISBN 978-0-8166-1400-4.
- Gilles Deleuze (with Robert Galeta) (2007). Cinema 2: the time image ([Online-Ausg.]. ed.). Minneapolis: University of Minnesota Press. ISBN 0-8166-1677-9.
