= HKSAR v Lai Chee Ying (2025) =

2025 Hong Kong national security and sedition case

HKSAR v Lai Chee Ying & Others
- Judiciary of Hong Kong
- Court: Court of First Instance
- Full case name: HKSAR v Lai Chee Ying & Others
- Decided: 15 December 2025
- Citation: [2025] HKCFI 6291
- Transcript: [2025] HKCFI 6291

Case history
- Subsequent actions: Sentencing: HKSAR v Lai Chee Ying and Others [2026] HKCFI 854

Court membership
- Judges sitting: Toh Lye Ping Esther; Susana Maria D'Almada Remedios; Lee Wan Tang Alex

Case opinions
- Decision by: Toh, D'Almada Remedios and Lee JJ

Keywords
- National security; sedition; conspiracy; corporate criminal liability

Area of law
- Criminal law; national security; sedition

HKSAR v Lai Chee Ying & Others [2025] HKCFI 6291 was a Hong Kong Court of First Instance national security and sedition case concerning Jimmy Lai Chee-ying and three Apple Daily-related companies. The court convicted Lai and the three corporate defendants of conspiracy to publish seditious publications and conspiracy to commit collusion by requesting foreign sanctions, blockade or other hostile activities, and convicted Lai alone on a separate collusion conspiracy count.

The court found that Lai exercised substantial influence over Apple Daily and used the newspaper as a platform for his political objectives. It held that an agreement to seek foreign sanctions and other hostile activities pre-dated the National Security Law (NSL) and continued after it came into force. Although Lai ceased making direct or explicit requests for sanctions after 1 July 2020, the court found that he adopted a more indirect and subtle strategy while the substance of the campaign remained unchanged.

On 9 February 2026, Lai was sentenced to a total of 20 years' imprisonment in HKSAR v Lai Chee Ying and Others [2026] HKCFI 854. Apple Daily Limited, Apple Daily Printing Limited and AD Internet Limited were each fined HK$3,004,500. Lai subsequently decided not to appeal against either his convictions or sentence.

== Background ==
The case arose from the 2019 social unrest due to the proposal of the Fugitive Offenders and Mutual Legal Assistance in Criminal Matters Legislation Amendment Bill and the later enactment of the Hong Kong National Security Law (NSL) on 30 June 2020.

On 28 February 2020, Jimmy Lai, along with former Hong Kong Alliance in Support of Patriotic Democratic Movements of China chairman Lee Cheuk-yan and former Democratic Party chairman Yeung Sum, were arrested by the Hong Kong police at their homes. They were accused of participating in an unauthorised assembly on 31 August 2019. Lai was also charged with criminal intimidation for allegedly threatening a newspaper reporter on 4 June 2017.

On 18 April 2020, the Hong Kong police arrested Lai as part of a wider operation targeting pro-democracy figures over unauthorised assemblies in 2019. Lai was subsequently charged over his involvement in unauthorised assemblies on 18 August and 1 October 2019.

In July 2020, in an interview with Next Magazine, Lai criticised the CCP's enactment of the Hong Kong National Security Law and publicly denounced Xi Jinping, the general secretary of the CCP Central Committee. On 10 August 2020, the Hong Kong Police National Security Department arrested Lai and six others, including his sons and senior Next Digital personnel, on suspicion of offences including collusion with foreign forces under the NSL. Hundreds of officers subsequently entered the Apple Daily headquarters as part of an hours-long search. The search involved nearly 200 officers, lasted about nine hours and resulted in 25 boxes of evidence being removed.

On 17 June 2021, police arrested five Apple Daily executives, including editor-in-chief Ryan Law and associate publisher Chan Pui-man, under the NSL. Around 500 police officers raided and searched the newspaper's newsroom and seized computers. Following the arrests and the freezing of assets linked to the newspaper, Apple Daily ceased operations and published its final edition on 24 June 2021.

== Parties and charges ==
The prosecution alleged that Apple Daily was used as a platform for publications said to be seditious and for content that requested foreign states or external actors to impose "sanctions or blockade, or engage in other hostile activities" against the PRC and/or the HKSAR.

The prosecution proceeded on three conspiracy counts:

1. conspiracy to print, publish, sell, offer for sale, distribute, display and/or reproduce seditious publications, contrary to the Crimes Ordinance (Cap. 200);
2. conspiracy to commit collusion contrary to Article 29(4) of the NSL by requesting sanctions, blockade or other hostile activities against the HKSAR or PRC; and
3. a separate conspiracy to commit collusion charge against Lai involving specified external co-conspirators.

The indictment also contained a substantive collusion charge against Lai related to the third count. The prosecution elected to proceed on the conspiracy charge instead, and the substantive charge was left on the indictment with the court's leave.

== Pre-trial proceedings ==
=== Stay application and time-limit challenge ===
Before trial, Lai applied for a stay of proceedings on the grounds that the proceedings would violate his right to a hearing before an independent and impartial tribunal and that a fair-minded and informed observer would conclude that the trial would not be free from political interference. The court dismissed the application on 29 May 2023.

At the beginning of the trial, Lai and the corporate defendants also argued that Count 1, the sedition conspiracy charge, was time-barred. The court rejected the challenge in HKSAR v Lai Chee Ying and Others [2023] HKCFI 3337. Lai subsequently applied to reopen the issue, but the application was dismissed on 2 January 2024.

=== Tim Owen and NPCSC interpretation ===
Lai sought to instruct British barrister Tim Owen KC to represent him at trial. On 19 October 2022, the Court of First Instance granted Owen ad hoc admission under section 27(4) of the Legal Practitioners Ordinance in Re Timothy Wynn Owen KC [2022] HKCFI 3233. The Secretary for Justice appealed, but the Court of Appeal dismissed the appeal on 9 November in Re Timothy Wynn Owen KC [2022] HKCA 1689 and refused leave to appeal to the Court of Final Appeal on 21 November in [2022] HKCA 1751. On 28 November, the Appeal Committee of the Court of Final Appeal also refused leave to appeal in Secretary for Justice v Timothy Wynn Owen KC [2022] HKCFA 23.

In refusing leave, the Court of Final Appeal held that the Secretary for Justice's proposed national security arguments were substantially new points that had not been raised or explored in the courts below. It therefore declined to entertain them under the principles governing new points on appeal, while noting that national security considerations, where properly raised in an application for ad hoc admission, were of the highest importance.

Following the Court of Final Appeal's decision, Chief Executive John Lee Ka-chiu submitted a report to the Central People's Government recommending that an interpretation of the NSL be sought from the Standing Committee of the National People's Congress (NPCSC). On 30 December 2022, the NPCSC issued an interpretation of Articles 14 and 47 of the NSL. The interpretation provided that whether an overseas lawyer not qualified to practise generally in Hong Kong could act in a national security case was a question requiring certification by the Chief Executive under Article 47. Where a court had not requested or obtained such a certificate, the Committee for Safeguarding National Security was to make a judgment and decision on the question under Article 14.

Owen had applied to the Immigration Department for approval to undertake the case as sideline employment under his employment visa, but withdrew the application on 3 January 2023. On 11 January, the Committee for Safeguarding National Security decided that Owen's proposed representation of Lai concerned national security, was likely to constitute national security risks and was contrary to the interests of national security. It advised the Director of Immigration that any fresh application by Owen for approval to undertake the case should be refused.

Lai subsequently commenced proceedings seeking, among other things, a declaration that the NPCSC interpretation did not affect the earlier judgments admitting Owen, and separately sought leave to apply for judicial review of the decisions of the Committee and the Director of Immigration. On 19 May 2023, the Court of First Instance dismissed both proceedings in Lai Chee Ying v Secretary for Justice; Lai Chee Ying v Committee for Safeguarding National Security of the HKSAR and Others [2023] HKCFI 1382. The court held that the Hong Kong courts had no jurisdiction under Article 14 of the NSL to judicially review the work and decisions of the Committee. It also held that, although the NPCSC interpretation did not invalidate or overrule the earlier judgments admitting Owen, the interpretation and the subsequent decisions of the Committee and Director of Immigration governed the position following those judgments.

Lai appealed against the refusal of leave to challenge the decisions of the Committee and the Director of Immigration. On 16 April 2024, the Court of Appeal dismissed the appeal in Lai Chee Ying v Committee for Safeguarding National Security of the HKSAR [2024] HKCA 400. The court held that, when Article 14 was read together with the NPCSC interpretation, the Hong Kong courts had no jurisdiction to review any judgment, decision or act of the Committee.

=== Non-jury trial ===
In August 2022, the Secretary for Justice Paul Lam issued a certificate under Article 46 of the NSL directing that the case be tried without a jury. The certificate cited the involvement of foreign elements, the personal safety of jurors and their family members, and the risk of perverting the course of justice if the trial were conducted with a jury. The case was accordingly tried by a panel of three designated national security judges.

== Trial ==
The trial began on 18 December 2023 and concluded on 28 August 2025 after 156 hearing days. Lai and the three corporate defendants pleaded not guilty. Lai's defence team was led by Robert Pang Yiu-hung SC.

The prosecution closed its case on 11 June 2024, the 90th hearing day. After the court dismissed Lai's no-case submission on 25 July, the proceedings were adjourned until 20 November, when Lai began giving evidence.

=== Prosecution case ===
The prosecution alleged that Lai had used Apple Daily as a platform to pursue his political objectives during and after the anti-extradition-bill protests and had worked with overseas contacts and co-conspirators to seek foreign intervention against the PRC and HKSAR. It alleged that agreements underlying the collusion charges had been formed before the NSL came into force and continued afterwards.

For Count 1, the prosecution alleged that Lai and senior Apple Daily management had agreed to use the newspaper to publish seditious material. For Count 2, it alleged that Lai, the corporate defendants and senior management had agreed to use Apple Daily to request foreign sanctions, blockade or other hostile activities and continued that agreement after 30 June 2020. For Count 3, it alleged that Lai, Mark Simon, Chan Tsz-wah, Li Yu-hin, Lau Cho-dik and others had agreed to pursue international lobbying, including through Stand with Hong Kong, to obtain such foreign measures.

The prosecution called six accomplice witnesses: former Apple Daily executives Cheung Kim-hung, Chan Pui-man and Yeung Ching-kee; Li Yu-hin, also known as Andy Li; Chan Tsz-wah, also known as Wayland Chan; and Chow Tat-kuen, also known as Royston Chow.

=== Evidence concerning Apple Daily ===
Cheung, Chan Pui-man, Yeung and Chow gave evidence concerning Lai's role in the management and editorial direction of Apple Daily. Their evidence was that Lai was a hands-on proprietor whose political views influenced the newspaper's editorial policy through, among other things, lunchbox meetings, instructions to senior management, his own articles and the selection of contributors. During cross-examination of Chan Pui-man, the defence argued that Lai made general suggestions rather than specific editorial directions, while Chan maintained that Lai ultimately had the "final say" at the lunchbox meetings. Yeung described the newspaper's editorial independence as "independence in a birdcage", in which editorial staff retained a degree of discretion within the overall stance set by Lai.

The prosecution also relied on Lai's own articles, tweets and the Live Chat with Jimmy Lai programme, together with evidence concerning the launch of the newspaper's English-language news service and its response to the NSL. Cheung testified that the English edition was intended to reach a US audience and said that Lai wanted it to adopt a more strongly anti-China stance; Cheung characterised the project as an attempt to increase anti-China sentiment in the United States. The prosecution contended that these materials were relevant both to the alleged sedition conspiracy and to Lai's intention in relation to the collusion charges.

=== Foreign lobbying and Count 3 ===
The prosecution case on Count 3 concerned a separate international lobbying network involving Mark Simon, Andy Li, Wayland Chan, Finn Lau and others. It relied on Chan's evidence concerning his meetings and communications with Lai and Simon, together with WhatsApp and Signal messages, evidence of crowdfunding and overseas lobbying campaigns, and activities associated with Stand with Hong Kong and the Inter-Parliamentary Alliance on China. Andy Li testified under cross-examination that he had never met or contacted Lai and had never received money from Lai or from entities he believed were associated with him.

=== Lai's defence ===
Lai gave evidence in his defence and spent 52 days in the witness box. He denied that there was a conspiracy to publish seditious material and maintained that Apple Daily had editorial independence, although he accepted that he had occasionally given editorial directions. He said that his foreign relationships had developed naturally through business and shared political values and denied that those relationships involved agreements to solicit foreign intervention.

Lai accepted that before the NSL he had requested foreign countries to impose sanctions, blockade or other hostile activities, but maintained that he stopped doing so once the law came into force. His case was that later references to such measures were comments, opinions or predictions protected by freedom of expression rather than requests. He also denied that any pre-NSL agreement to seek such measures continued after 30 June 2020 and challenged the evidence of the prosecution accomplice witnesses. Lai denied trying to influence US foreign policy and said he had sought expressions of support rather than specific action from senior US officials.

The corporate defendants did not give evidence or call witnesses. Their case was that the senior managers relied upon by the prosecution did not constitute their "directing mind and will" and therefore their acts and intentions could not be attributed to the companies.

=== No-case submission ===
At the close of the prosecution case, Lai submitted that there was no case to answer. He argued that there was no evidence of an agreement continuing after 1 July 2020 to seek sanctions or other hostile activities, that the material relied upon for Count 2 did not amount to a "request", and that the accomplice witnesses' evidence showed that he had sought to operate within the law.

Applying the test in R v Galbraith [1981] 1 WLR 1039, the court rejected the submission. It held that there was sufficient evidence to support a prima facie case on Counts 2 and 3 and that whether the alleged agreements continued and whether the impugned material amounted to requests were matters for determination at the end of the trial. It also held that there was sufficient evidence to require Lai to answer Count 1. Lai was therefore called upon to answer all three counts.

== Decision and judgment ==
=== Conspiracy ===
The court held that criminal conspiracy is a continuing offence. An agreement made before a change in the law could therefore continue after the change if the agreement remained in existence and the defendant remained a party to it with the necessary intention. The prosecution did not have to prove that a new agreement had been reached after the NSL came into force, nor was it necessary to prove the precise date on which the conspiracy began, provided that it existed during the period charged.

The court rejected Lai's argument that the contractual doctrine of frustration applied to criminal conspiracy. It emphasised that Lai's conduct before the NSL came into force was not itself the subject of the national security charges, but could be considered as background when determining whether the alleged conspiracies continued after 30 June 2020.

=== Collusion offences ===
In construing Article 29(4) of the NSL, the court held that the terms "sanctions", "blockade", "hostile activities" and "request" should be given their plain and ordinary meanings. A request could be express or implied, oral or written. The court therefore rejected the submission from the defence that the law of "incitement" governed the meaning of "request".

The court held that the substantive offence under Article 29(4) did not require the requested sanctions, blockade or other hostile activities actually to occur. It described the offence as an "action crime" rather than a "result crime". For conspiracy to commit collusion, the prosecution was required to establish an agreement to make such a request, but was not required to prove that the accused knew that the agreement was unlawful.

=== Sedition ===
For Count 1, the court applied the Court of Final Appeal's decision in HKSAR v Tam Tak Chi (2025) 28 HKCFAR 122, holding that an intention to incite violence or public disorder was not an element of the sedition offence under the former section 10 of the Crimes Ordinance. The court held that the conspiracy charge did not require proof that a seditious publication had actually been published or that the accused knew that the agreement was unlawful.

=== Corporate criminal liability ===
The court applied the doctrine of attribution in determining the liability of the three corporate defendants. It held that the acts and intentions of persons constituting a company's "directing mind and will" could be attributed to the company for the purpose of criminal liability.

The court found that Lai exercised de facto control over the corporate defendants through his majority shareholding in Next Digital and substantial shareholder loans, despite not being a director of the three companies at the material time. It further found that senior executives responsible for implementing Lai's editorial policies and managing the companies collectively constituted their directing mind and will. Their intentions were therefore attributable to the corporate defendants.

=== Assessment of the evidence ===
The court accepted the factual evidence of the six accomplice witnesses, namely Cheung Kim-hung, Chan Pui-man, Yeung Ching-kee, Andy Li, Wayland Chan and Royston Chow, as credible and reliable. It distinguished their evidence of facts from opinions they had expressed while testifying. By contrast, it found Lai neither credible nor reliable and rejected the exculpatory parts of his evidence.

In assessing Lai's testimony, the court placed considerable weight on contemporaneous WhatsApp and Signal messages, emails, interviews and articles. It found that Lai had given inconsistent, contradictory and unreliable evidence on significant matters and, when confronted with documentary evidence inconsistent with his testimony, had at times offered explanations that the court considered implausible. The court also stated that it had taken into account the possibility that accomplice witnesses might have a motive to give evidence favourable to the prosecution in the hope of obtaining lighter sentences and had looked for documentary support for their testimony.

Among the matters rejected by the court was Lai's evidence that he and Mark Simon "seldom talk[ed] about politics"; the court found instead that they discussed political matters extensively and that Lai relied on Simon for information and input. It also rejected Lai's contention that his post-NSL references to sanctions and other foreign measures were merely descriptions or predictions rather than requests.

=== Findings and verdicts ===
On Count 1, the court found that Lai was a hands-on proprietor who gave editorial directions and whose political views bore heavily on Apple Daily's editorial policy. It adopted the description of Lai as the newspaper's "helmsman" and found that he had used Apple Daily as a platform for his political agenda. It ultimately found that Lai was the mastermind of an agreement involving senior management to pursue what the court characterised as a seditious campaign through the newspaper. Lai was found guilty of the sedition conspiracy, and the three corporate defendants were held liable through the doctrine of attribution.

On Count 2, the court found that before the NSL, Lai had openly campaigned, through Apple Daily, his personal Twitter account, foreign media articles and interviews, for sanctions and other hostile activities against the PRC and HKSAR. It found that senior management knowingly participated in that campaign and that an agreement to request such measures existed before the NSL came into force. Although Lai ceased making direct or explicit requests for sanctions after 1 July 2020 and senior management took steps intended to reduce legal risk, the court found that he continued the campaign by toning down his rhetoric and adopting a more indirect and subtle strategy. The court held that the change was one of form rather than substance and that the pre-NSL agreement continued after the law came into force. Lai and the three corporate defendants were convicted on Count 2.

On Count 3, the court found that before the NSL there was an agreement between Mark Simon, Andy Li, Wayland Chan, Finn Lau and others to engage in international lobbying to obtain foreign support for the Hong Kong resistance movement, including requests for sanctions and other hostile activities. It found that the campaign continued after the NSL came into force. Relying principally on Wayland Chan's evidence together with Lai's WhatsApp and Signal messages and other documentary evidence, the court found that Lai was also a party to the agreement and that the agreement continued after 30 June 2020. Lai was convicted on the count.

Accordingly, Lai was convicted on all three counts, while Apple Daily Limited, Apple Daily Printing Limited and AD Internet Limited were convicted on Counts 1 and 2.

== Sentencing ==
Mitigation was heard on 12 and 13 January 2026. On 9 February 2026, the court handed down its reasons for sentence in HKSAR v Lai Chee Ying and Others [2026] HKCFI 854.

For Counts 2 and 3, the court held that the conspiracies were offences "of a grave nature" under Article 29 of the NSL and adopted a starting point of 15 years' imprisonment for each count. For Count 1, it adopted a starting point of 21 months' imprisonment. After finding that Lai was the mastermind and driving force behind the conspiracies, the court increased the provisional sentence on Count 1 to 23 months and those on Counts 2 and 3 to 18 years each.

In mitigation, the court considered Lai's age, health and solitary confinement. It concluded that the combined effect of those circumstances would make imprisonment more burdensome for him than for other inmates, and reduced the sentence on Count 1 by one month and those on Counts 2 and 3 by one year each. Applying the totality principle, the court imposed an aggregate sentence of 20 years' imprisonment.

The court fined each of Apple Daily Limited, Apple Daily Printing Limited and AD Internet Limited HK$4,500 on Count 1 and HK$3 million on Count 2, producing a total fine of HK$3,004,500 for each company.

== Subsequent proceedings ==
At the time Lai was sentenced, he was serving a five-year-and-nine-month sentence imposed in a separate fraud case, DCCC 349/2021. The court directed that 18 years of his national security sentence be served consecutively to that sentence. On 26 February 2026, however, the Court of Appeal allowed Lai's appeal in HKSAR v Lai Chee Ying and Another [2026] HKCA 317, quashing his fraud convictions and setting aside the sentences.

On 6 March 2026, Lai's lawyers announced that he had instructed them not to appeal against either his convictions or the 20-year sentence in the present case.

== Reactions ==
The verdict attracted international criticism. On 17 December 2025, the foreign ministers of the G7 and the European Union High Representative condemned Lai's prosecution, expressed concern over deteriorating rights, freedoms and media freedom in Hong Kong, and called for his immediate release. The British government separately described the prosecution as politically motivated and summoned the Chinese ambassador following the verdict.

Press-freedom and human-rights organisations also criticised the verdict. Amnesty International said that the conviction "feels like the death knell for press freedom in Hong Kong", while the Committee to Protect Journalists condemned the conviction and called for Lai's immediate release.

Following the imposition of the 20-year sentence in February 2026, the European Union reiterated its call for Lai's immediate and unconditional release and said that the prosecution harmed Hong Kong's reputation. It also called on the Hong Kong authorities to restore confidence in press freedom and stop prosecuting journalists.

The Hong Kong government rejected the criticism. Following the verdict, it maintained that the court had reached its decision strictly on the basis of law and evidence and accused foreign governments, media and organisations of attempting to interfere with Hong Kong's judicial process. Following sentencing, Chief Executive John Lee Ka-chiu said that the 20-year sentence showed that the rule of law had been upheld and justice done, while the government again condemned foreign criticism of the case.

== See also ==
- Jimmy Lai
- Hong Kong National Security Law
- Apple Daily
- 2019–2020 Hong Kong protests
