= Jimmy Lai =

Hong Kong businessman and activist (born 1947)

- 黎智英
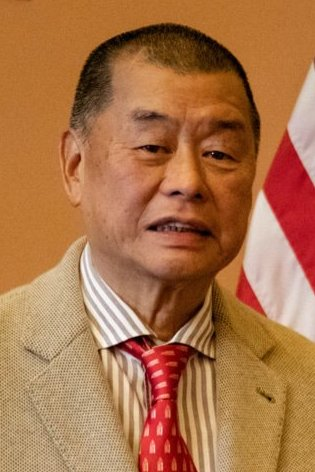
- Lai at the U.S. Capitol in 2019
- Born: Lai Chee-ying; 8 December 1947 (age 78); Canton, Guangdong, China
- Other name: Fatty Lai
- Occupations: Entrepreneur; activist
- Title: Founder and ex-chairman of Next Digital; Founder of Giordano International
- Criminal charges: Unauthorised assembly (convicted, 20-month jail); 18 August rally, 12-month jail; 31 August rally, 8-month jail; 1 October rally, 14-month jail; 2020 Tiananmen vigil, 14-month jail; Fraud (conviction quashed on appeal); Conspiracy to publish seditious publications (convicted); Conspiracy to collude with foreign forces (two counts; convicted, 20-year jail in total)

Jimmy Lai
- Chinese: 黎智英
Transcriptions
Standard Mandarin
- Hanyu Pinyin: Lí Zhìyīng
Yue: Cantonese
- Jyutping: Lai^{4} Zi^{3} Jing^{1}

Lai Chee-ying (Chinese: 黎智英; born 8 December 1947), also known as Jimmy Lai, is a Hong Kong businessman, politician, and political prisoner. He founded the clothing retailer Giordano, the media company Next Digital (formerly Next Media), and the newspaper Apple Daily. He is one of the main contributors to Hong Kong's pro-democracy camp, especially to the Democratic Party. A British citizen since 1994, he was imprisoned in 2020 and his business operations shuttered under pressure from the Chinese government.

A prominent critic of the Chinese Communist Party (CCP) who met with U.S. Vice President Mike Pence, Secretary of State Mike Pompeo, and National Security Advisor John Bolton during the Hong Kong protests of 2019–2020, Lai was arrested on 10 August 2020 by the Hong Kong Police Force on charges of violating the new national security law, an action which prompted widespread criticism. He was ultimately sentenced to 20 years in prison, a penalty Human Rights Watch called "both cruel and profoundly unjust" and Reporters Without Borders called bogus. As of September 2025, Lai remained imprisoned in solitary confinement at Hong Kong's Stanley Prison although this was at his own request to be segregated from other inmates, for reasons of his own. Lai regarded his imprisonment as "the summit of his own life".

In 2020, Lai was awarded the "Freedom of Press Award" by Reporters Without Borders for his role in founding Apple Daily, a news outlet under Lai's pro-democracy leadership that "still dares to openly criticise the Chinese regime and which widely covered last year's pro-democracy protests." That same month, Lai resigned from his roles with Next Digital as director and chairman of the board.

In 2026, Liberal International named Lai the laureate of its Prize for Freedom, awarded to individuals who had made exceptional contributions to human rights and political freedoms.

== Early life ==
Lai was born in Canton (Guangzhou), then part of the Republic of China, to a once-wealthy business family whose fortunes collapsed after the Communist takeover. When he was seven, his family was torn apart during the political turmoil of the early People's Republic. His father had left for Hong Kong, his mother was sent to labour reform, and his older siblings were dispersed, leaving Lai to fend largely for himself with his twin sister and a mentally disabled sister. Sustained at first by the charity of neighbours, he soon began bartering and selling household items to survive, later turning to petty trading and black-market hawking near cinemas and train stations to keep his siblings fed, all while dodging police raids and street violence. He continued working even after his mother's release, as the family still depended on his income.

Based on his own words, while earning money carrying luggage at a train station, he was once tipped with a piece of chocolate by a man from Hong Kong; starving, he was struck by its sweetness, began to see Hong Kong as a kind of paradise. Determined to reach that promised place, he stowed away alone at age 12 to Hong Kong, where he found work as a child labourer in a garment factory earning the equivalent of US$8 a month and taught himself English.

== Business career ==
=== Giordano ===
Lai's factory work saw him rise to the position of factory manager. In 1975, Lai used his year-end bonus on Hong Kong stocks to raise cash and bought a bankrupt garment factory, Comitex, where he began producing and exporting sweaters. Customers included J.C. Penney, Montgomery Ward, and other U.S. retailers.

In 1981, Lai founded Asian clothing retailer Giordano. By rewarding sellers with financial incentives in Hong Kong, he built the chain into an Asia-wide retailer. Giordano was said to have more than 8,000 employees in 2,400 shops in 30 countries.

In 1996, Lai sold his stake in Giordano, leaving the garment industry for media and politics, keeping Comitex active as a shell company. After his arrest under National Security Law in August 2020, Lai tried to sell his asset in Hong Kong, including the entire floor of Tai Ping Industrial Centre. Comitex, along with other private companies controlled by Lai, was reported to be the financial tools for his political activities and donations.

=== Other ventures ===
In 1997, Lai put up the capital for his twin sister, Lai Si-wai, to acquire numerous properties in the Southern Ontario wine and vacation region of Niagara-on-the-Lake. The Lais Group of Companies now owns additional properties in Caledon and Jordan, both in Ontario. Lai remains the owner despite his arrest.

During the dot-com boom of the late 1990s, Lai started an Internet-based grocery retailer that offered home delivery services, adMart. The business expanded its product scope beyond groceries to include electronics and office supplies, but was shut down after losing between $100 and $150 million. Lai attributed this business failure to overconfidence and a lack of viable business strategy.

In 2011, Lai's private company Sum Tat Ventures, based in British Virgin Islands, acquired the entirety of Next Media's subsidiary Colored World Holdings for US$120 million, shortly after which CWH ceased operations. Near the end of 2013, Lai spent approximately US$73 million (or NT$2.3 billion) to purchase a 2 per cent stake in Taiwanese electronics manufacturer HTC.

=== Activities in Myanmar ===
In 2014, leaked documents showed Lai paid former US deputy defence secretary and former World Bank president Paul Wolfowitz US$75,000 for his help with projects in Myanmar. Lai also reportedly remitted approximately US$213,000 to an NGO run by businessman Phone Win, with whom Lai's Hong Kong-registered Best Combo company reportedly collaborated on Yangon real estate projects.

== Media career ==
Lai emerged as one of the most influential and controversial media entrepreneurs in Hong Kong and Taiwan, pioneering a reader-centric, mass-market approach that blended tabloid energy with political reporting. Inspired by publications such as USA Today and The Sun, Lai introduced paparazzi journalism, bold graphics, and accessible language to his audience through Next Magazine and Apple Daily.

Lai has faced sustained pressure and attempts to silence him throughout his career, encompassing political, commercial, and physical intimidation. His publications were banned in mainland China since their inception, reportedly after he told then-premier Li Peng, often seen as the person behind the 1989 Tiananmen Square crackdown, to "drop dead" and called the Chinese Communist Party "a monopoly that charges a premium for lousy service" in a 1994 column. Beijing also exerted commercial pressure on his retail business, prompting him to sell his stake in Giordano. In addition, he was subjected to repeated acts of intimidation aimed at silencing him, including assault, vehicle ramming, weapons left at his residence, and multiple petrol bombings targeting his home and media headquarters.

Over the years, pro-Beijing tycoons and major corporations in Hong Kong were said to have avoided advertising in his outlets, a practice former Chief Executive Leung Chun-ying has publicly admitted that while in office he met major advertisers and helped drive Apple Daily’s ad revenue down, despite official denials at the time. Furthermore, Lai faced supplier boycotts and obstacles listing his company on the Hong Kong Stock Exchange, which he ultimately achieved in 1999 through a reverse takeover of Paramount Publishing Group.

=== Hong Kong publications ===
Following the 1989 Tiananmen Square crackdown, Lai became an outspoken advocate of democracy and critic of the Beijing government. In 1990, he founded Next Magazine, which fused tabloid sensationalism with hard-hitting political and business reporting. He later launched a string of other magazines, including Sudden Weekly (忽然一週), Eat & Travel Weekly (飲食男女), Trading Express/Auto Express (交易通/搵車快線) and the youth-oriented Easy Finder (壹本便利).

In 1995, as the city prepared for the 1997 handover, Lai invested US$100 million of his own funds to establish Apple Daily. By 1997, its circulation had reached 400,000 copies, making it the territory's second-largest newspaper. Lai positioned the paper as a defender of press freedom and democratic values, and it frequently exposed the personal dealings and political ties of Hong Kong tycoons, earning both public support and elite hostility. In 2003, ahead of the 1 July march, Next Magazine and Apple Daily featured a photo-montage of the territory's embattled chief executive Tung Chee-Hwa taking a pie in the face. The magazine openly urged citizens to take to the streets while distributing stickers calling for Tung to resign. By 2006, Next Magazine and Sudden Weekly ranked first and second in Hong Kong's magazine circulation, while Apple Daily became the city's No. 2 newspaper.

In 2020, amid escalating political tensions, Lai launched an English-language edition of Apple Daily. Same year, the English edition published a 64-page report by Typhoon Investigations alleging that Hunter Biden, son of Joe Biden, had problematic ties to the Chinese Communist Party; the claims were widely circulated by far-right figures including Steve Bannon. A subsequent investigation by NBC News questioned the report's credibility, linking it to a purportedly fake intelligence firm and a fabricated author identity, while Christopher Balding later acknowledged writing parts of it and said it had been commissioned by Apple Daily. Lai denied personal involvement, though senior executive Mark Simon resigned over the matter. The report was among many incidents that was said to be instrumental to the January 6, 2021 Capitol attack.

=== Taiwan publications ===
Lai expanded into Taiwan with a Taiwanese edition of Next Magazine in 2001 and Apple Daily in 2003, entering a competitive and politically charged market. Established rivals reportedly pressured advertisers and distributors to boycott his publications, and his offices were vandalized on several occasions. Despite early resistance, his outlets eventually became market leaders in their categories, significantly influencing Taiwan's previously more restrained media culture. In 2006, he launched Sharp Daily, a free commuter newspaper, along with Me! Magazine.

== Political activities ==
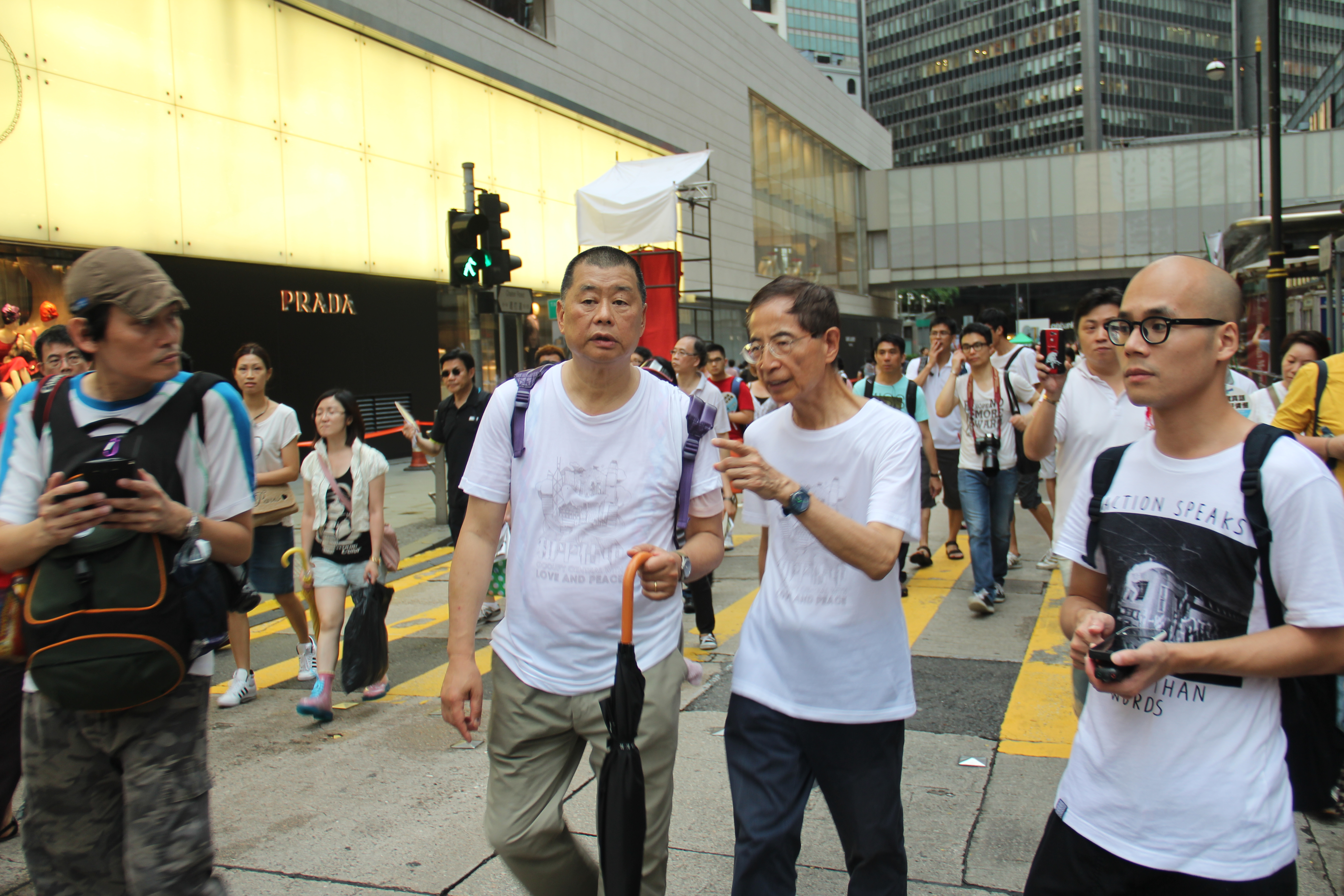
Lai and Martin Lee at 1 July marches, 2013

Lai is a longtime champion of the Hong Kong pro-democracy movement. According to Lai, The Road to Serfdom by Friedrich Hayek inspired him to fight for freedom. His advocacy had been expressed through his business ventures, such as distributing Giordano t-shirts with portraits of student leaders. His high-profile support for the pro-democracy movements came under strong condemnation from the Chinese government. As the proprietor of one of few that journals that has remained staunchly supportive of the pro-democracy cause, challenging Chinese Communist Party rule, Lai is considered an "anti-China troublemaker". In May 2020, Lai told CNN that US president Donald Trump was "the only one who can save us" from China, with Apple Daily publishing a similar plea addressed to Trump the same month. In the 2020 United States elections, Lai backed Trump, praising the latter for his "hardline approach" to Beijing.

On 13 December 2014, Lai was one of the pro-democracy leaders arrested during the clearance of the Admiralty protest site of the Umbrella Movement. On the following day, Lai announced he would step down as head of Next Media "to spend more time with his family and further pursue his personal interests."

Lai had been the target of hostile attacks and disturbances, including the leaving of machetes, axes and threatening messages in his driveway. He had been rammed by a car, and his home was firebombed several times, most recently in 2019. Lai's aide and Next Media spokesman Mark Simon condemned these attacks and stated, "This is a continual effort to intimidate the press in Hong Kong. This is raw and pure intimidation." Some activists felt that the Hong Kong Police Force and the Hong Kong government, which have been Chinese-controlled since the handover in 1997, did not always follow up on these misconducts against Lai, and that culprits are rarely found.

During the early hours of 12 January 2015, two masked men hurled petrol bombs at Lai's home on Kadoorie Avenue in Kowloon Tong. At the same time, a petrol bomb was thrown at the Next Media headquarters in Tseung Kwan O Industrial Estate. The fires were extinguished by security guards. The perpetrators fled and two cars used in the attacks were found torched in Shek Kip Mei and Cheung Sha Wan. The crimes were denounced as an "attack on press freedom".

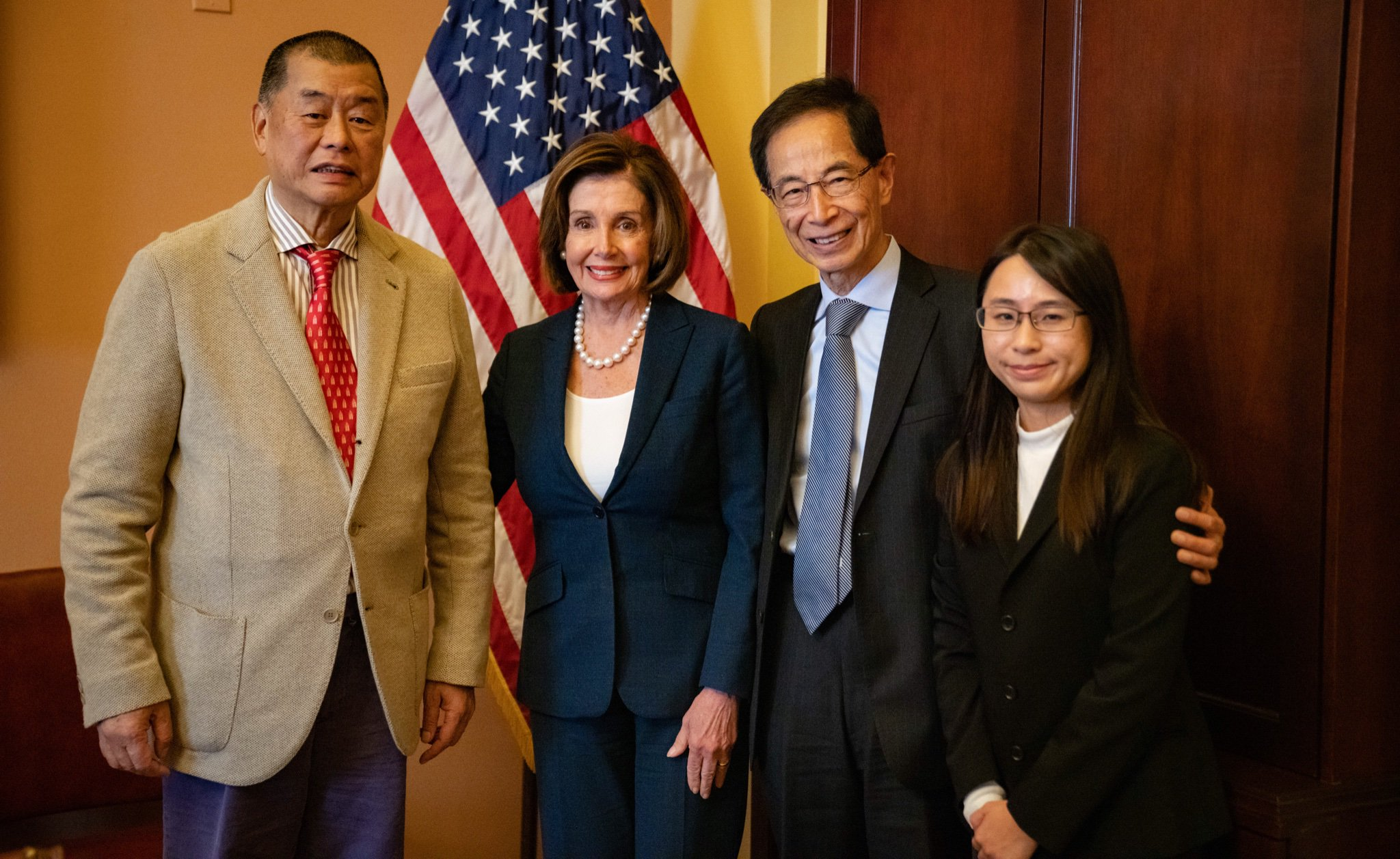
Meeting with US House Speaker Nancy Pelosi and Martin Lee on the topic of Hong Kong's pro-democracy protest. October 2019.

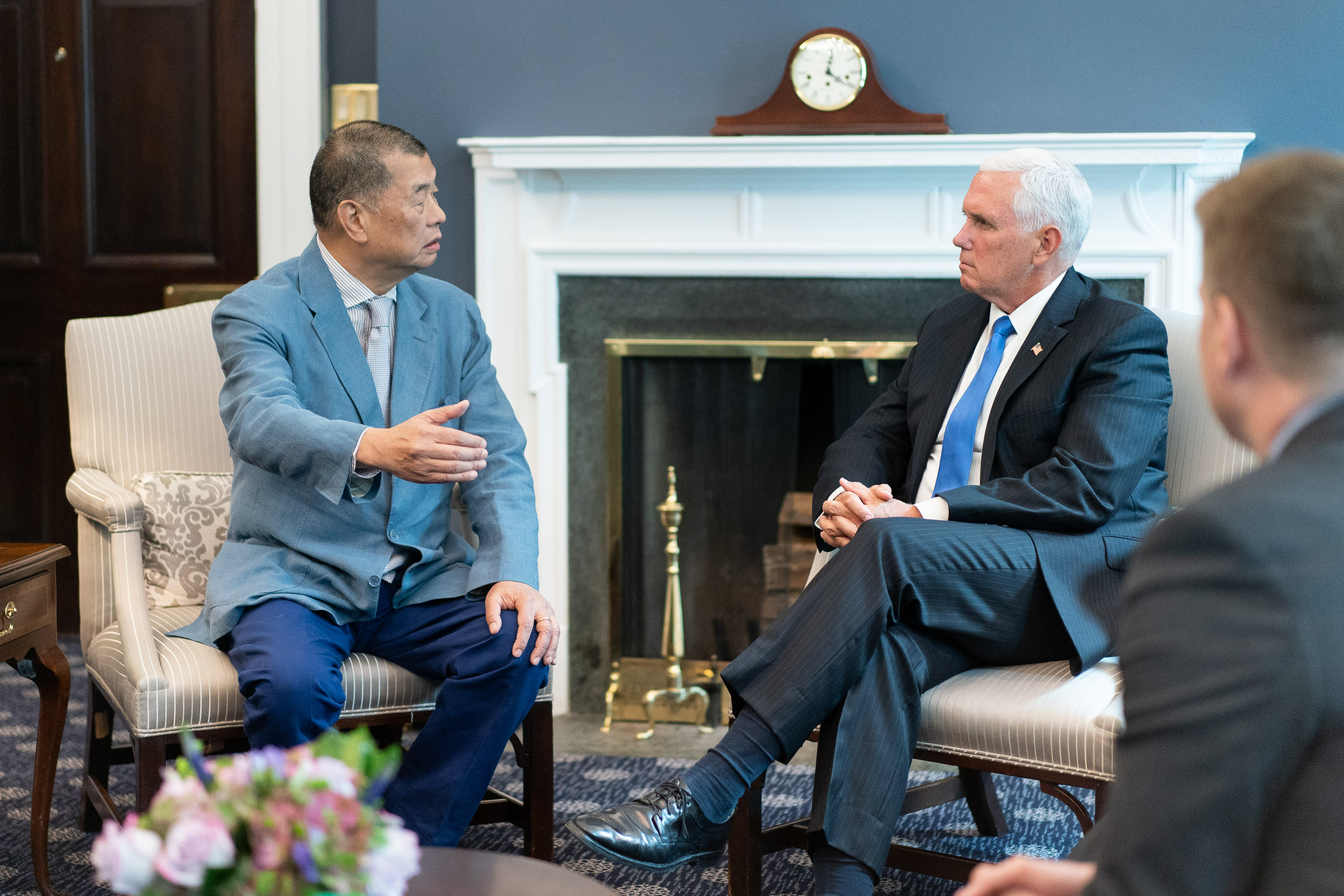
Lai met with US Vice President Pence to discuss Hong Kong pro-democracy protests. July 2019.

Between July and November 2019 Lai was able to meet with US Vice President Mike Pence and later with US House Speaker Nancy Pelosi to discuss the Hong Kong protests. Lai said, 'We in Hong Kong are fighting for the shared values of the US against China. We are fighting their war in the enemy camp.' Pelosi published a photograph of herself, Lai, along with Martin Lee and Janet Pang and supporting words to the Hong Kong protesters. Lai also later met with then US National Security Adviser John Bolton. Bloomberg reporter, Nicholas Wadham tweeted that the meeting was meant to send a signal to Beijing, as it was very "unusual for non governmental visitors to get this kind of access".

On 28 February 2020, Lai was arrested for illegal assembly during his attendance in the 2019–2020 Hong Kong protests, and for allegedly intimidating an Oriental Daily reporter after the reporter took photos of him in 2017. His case was scheduled to be heard at Eastern Law Court on 5 May. On 18 April 2020, Lai was among 15 high-profile democracy figures arrested in Hong Kong. According to a police statement, his arrest was based on suspicion of organising, publicising or taking part in several unauthorized assemblies between August and October 2019.

On 3 September 2020, Lai was found not guilty of the Oriental Daily criminal intimidation charge.

In December 2020, BBC News interviewed him when he was temporarily out on bail and continuing his activism from Apple Daily newsroom. Lai tearfully admitted his fear for his family as he continues his activism. He stated that if he ended up in jail, then he was living his life meaningfully. Lai stated that "If [the government] can induce fear in you, that's the easiest way to control you", adding that inducing fear was the cheapest and most effective way to control people.

=== National security law and prosecution ===
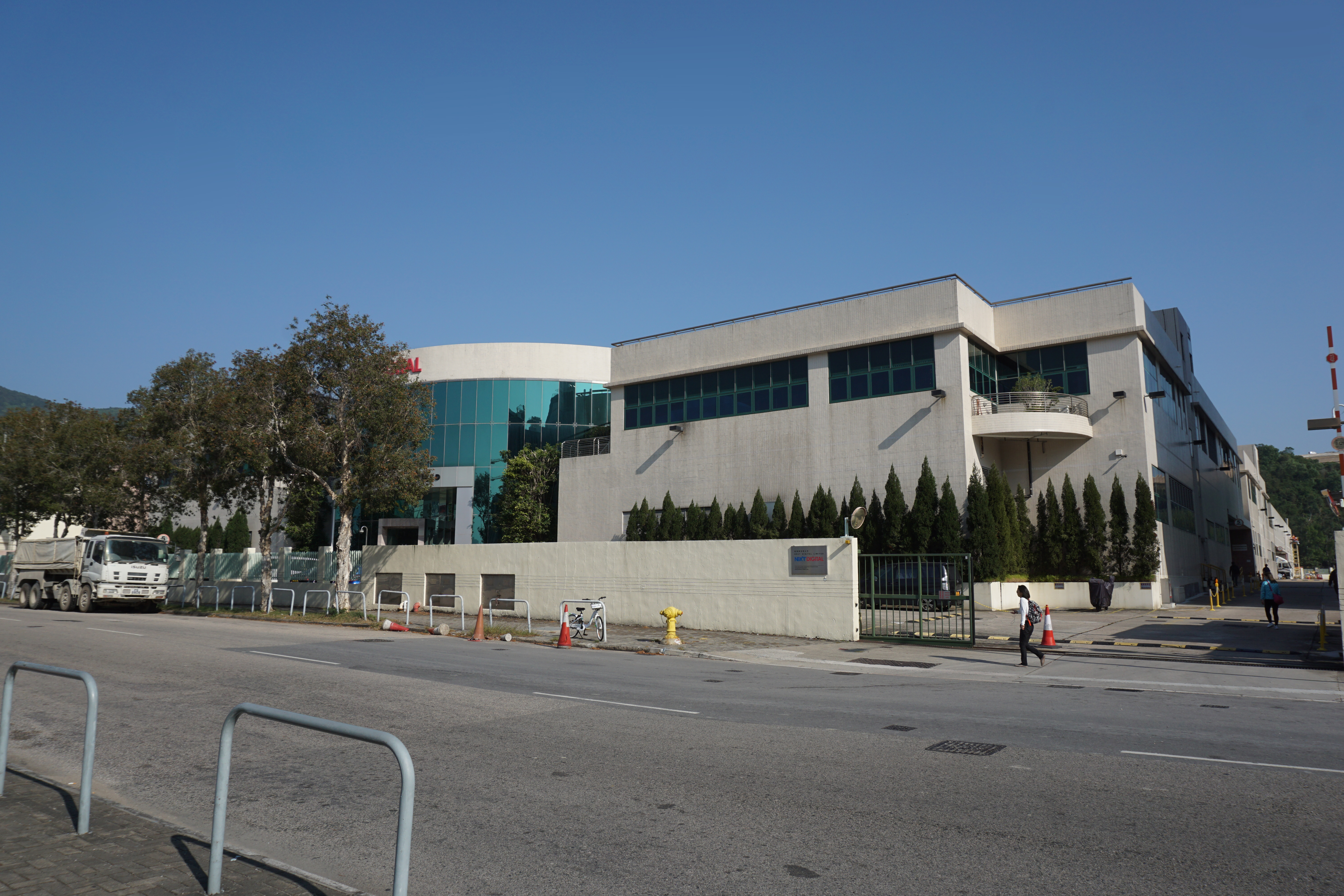
Next Digital offices, raided by police on 10 August 2020

On 30 June 2020, the Hong Kong national security law was enacted by China's parliament, by-passing the Legislative Council of Hong Kong. Before the law was enacted, Lai called it "a death knell for Hong Kong" and alleged that it would destroy the territory's rule of law.

On 10 August 2020, Lai was arrested at his home for alleged collusion with foreign forces (a crime under the new national security law) and fraud. Other Next Digital staff were also arrested, and police searched the home of both Lai and his son. Later in the morning, approximately 200 Hong Kong police officers raided the offices of Apple Daily in Tseung Kwan O Industrial Estate, seizing around 25 boxes of materials. HSBC took the step to freeze his bank account.

After Lai was arrested, the stock price of Next Digital rose as high as 331 per cent on 11 August. Bail was set at HK$300,000 (approx. US$38,705), with a surety of HK$200,000 (approx. US$25,803). Apple Daily said that more than 500,000 copies of its subsequent day's paper were printed, five times the usual number. The front page of Apple Daily showed an image of Lai in handcuffs with the headline: "Apple Daily must fight on."

The Hong Kong and Macao Affairs Office, an agency of mainland China, welcomed the arrest and called for Lai to be severely punished. The Hong Kong Journalists Association described the raid as "horrendous" and unprecedented in Hong Kong. The Democratic Party accused the government of trying to create a chilling effect in the Hong Kong media industry. Former governor Chris Patten called the events "the most outrageous assault yet" on Hong Kong's press. The head of the University of Hong Kong journalism department called the raid an "outrageous, shameful attack on press freedom".

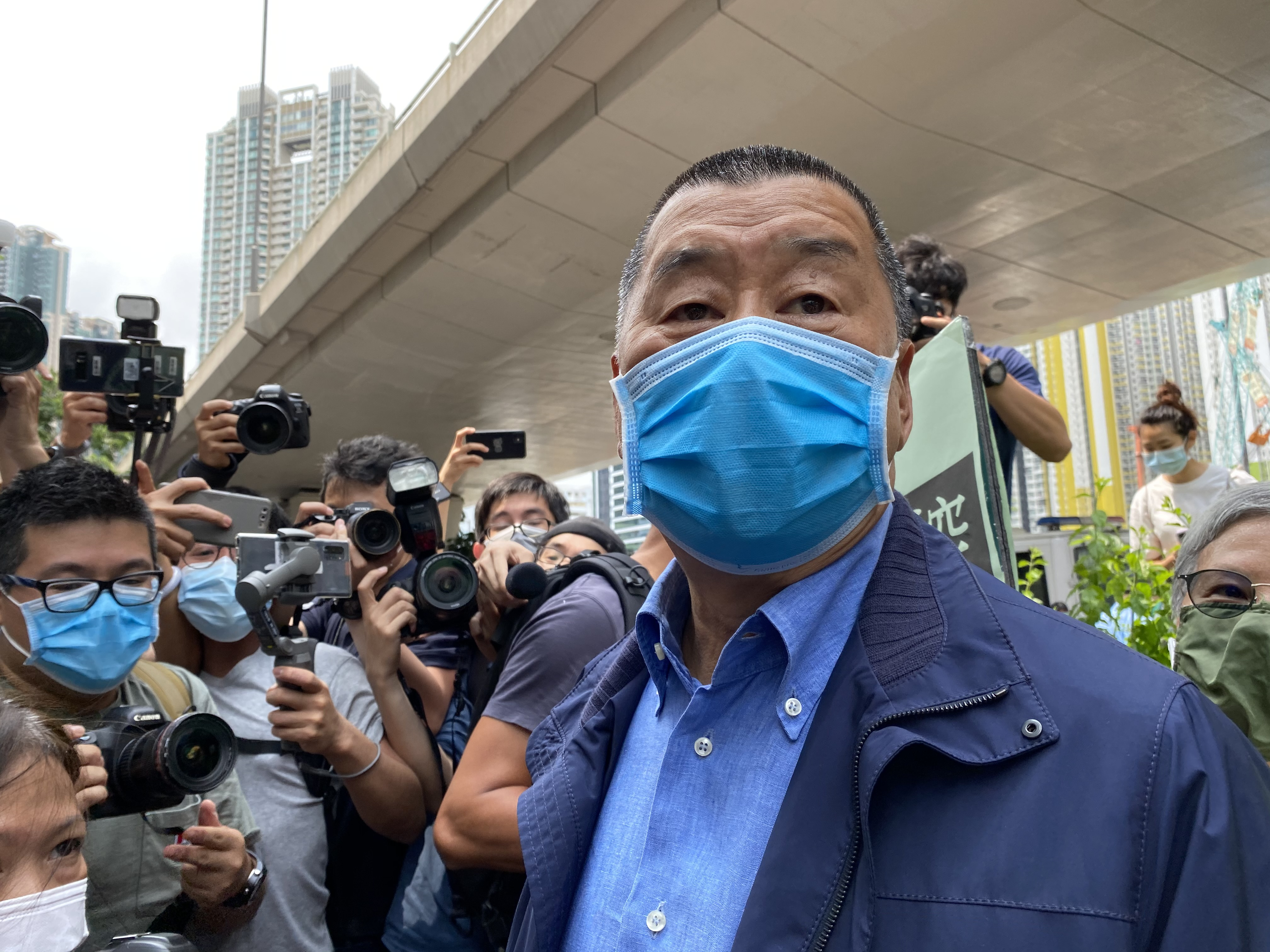
Photo of Lai as he was heading to court, 2 December 2020

On 2 December 2020, Lai reported to the police station as part of his bail condition for his August arrest related to ongoing national security law violation but was immediately arrested by police for alleged fraud, in that he and two Next Digital executives allegedly violated lease terms for Next Digital office space. Police referred to a further investigation into possible national security law violation against one of the three, apparently referring to Lai. The case was adjourned until April 2021, with Lai being denied bail.

On 11 December 2020, Lai became the first high-profile figure to be charged under the new national security law for allegedly conspiring and colluding with foreign forces to endanger national security. The main evidence for those charges, according to the prosecutors, consisted of statements that Lai had made on Twitter. He was accused of using Twitter and other media to request foreign sanctions against Hong Kong and mainland Chinese officials.

On 23 December 2020, Lai was granted bail by the High Court with the following conditions: HK$10 million deposit; HK$100,000 deposit by each of his three guarantors; To remain at his home at all times, except when reporting to police or attending court hearings (de facto house arrest); Surrender all travel documents; Banned from attending or hosting media interviews or programmes; Banned from publishing articles on any media, posting messages or comments on social media, including Twitter; Report to police thrice a week.

On 31 December 2020, the Hong Kong Court of Final Appeal ordered him back to prison after the Department of Justice, under prosecutor Anthony Chau Tin-hang, appealed his release on bail. On 9 February 2021, Hong Kong's top court denied his bail; a new bail application by Lai was rejected on 19 February.

On 16 February 2021, Lai was arrested while in prison for aiding activist Andy Li in his ill-fated attempt to escape to Taiwan with eleven others in August 2020.

On 1 April, he was convicted on a separate case over "unlawful assembly" during the 2019 protests along six other activists and politicians. On 16 April 2021, he was sentenced to 14 months in prison for the unauthorised assembly charge. As the sentencing was carried out, friends and family shouted "stand strong" and other words of support.

In May 2021, Lai's assets were all frozen by the Hong Kong government, including all the shares of Next Digital Limited and the property and local bank accounts of three companies owned by him. On 28 May 2021, Lai was sentenced to additional 14 months' imprisonment over his role in an unauthorised assembly in 2019. He must now serve 20 months in prison.

On 9 December 2021, (whilst serving his 21 April 2021 sentence) Lai and two others were convicted for their roles in the banned Tiananmen candlelight vigil in Hong Kong. Lai, together with Chow Hang-tung, a vice chairperson of the now-defunct vigil organiser the Hong Kong Alliance in Support of Patriotic Democratic Movements of China, and activist and former reporter Gwyneth Ho were convicted for either taking part in or inciting others to join the vigil. On 13 December 2021, Lai was sentenced to additional 13 months' imprisonment over his role in the banned vigil.

In 2022, the Acton Institute released a documentary about Lai's political activism, called The Hong Konger. In the film, Lai refers to how COVID-19 was used as a pretext for banning protesters from organising following the initial eruption of activity that came after the extradition law was first proposed in 2019. Lai went on to state that, "The younger generation and the older generation have never been so united." and that, "If we just surrender, we will lose everything." The documentary is also critical of the relationship between corporate investment and the lure to Western companies of Chinese markets and the potential for profit, as Jack Wolfsohn in the National Review wrote: "The documentary mentioned Wall Street's complicity in human-rights violations committed by China. Wall Street is so focused on making profits, the documentary points out, that it ignores blatant human-rights violations committed by the Chinese government against the Uyghurs, Tibetans, and the Hong Kongers. Yet, Wall Street continues to invest in China. Lai's reaction to this greed was predictable: "Any company that will bow down to China . . . that will hurt the dignity of the American people."

At an event screening the film, Mark Clifford, president of the Committee for Freedom in Hong Kong, warned of future conflicts, specifically speaking of Taiwan and beyond, "It won't stop in Taiwan. Totalitarianism is a cancer. It's spreading."

On 22 August 2022, Lai pled not-guilty to the charges related to "collusion with foreign forces."

In late 2022, Paul Lam and the Department of Justice made several appeals to the court system, in an attempt to disallow Lai from using a UK lawyer, Tim Owen. Upon rejection of the last appeal at the High Court on 28 November 2022, the government turned to the NPCSC to give an interpretation of the relevant passages of the National Security Law; on 30 December, the NPCSC ruled in favour of the government, giving the chief executive the power to bar foreign lawyers from cases related to national security.

On 10 December 2022, Lai was sentenced to five years and nine months, and fined 2 million Hong Kong dollars, over the fraud case.

On 17 December 2023, the U.S. State Department again called for Lai's release shortly before his trial was set to begin. Spokesperson Matthew Miller said: "We urge Beijing and Hong Kong authorities to respect press freedom in Hong Kong. Actions that stifle press freedom and restrict the free flow of information – as well as Beijing and local authorities’ changes to Hong Kong's electoral system that reduce direct voting and preclude independent and pro-democracy party candidates from participating – have undermined Hong Kong's democratic institutions and harmed Hong Kong's reputation as an international business and financial hub." In December 2023, British foreign secretary David Cameron called for the release of Lai, calling the charges against him politically motivated.

On 12 August 2024 the Hong Kong Court of Final Appeal rejected the appeals by Jimmy Lai and six others against conviction for taking part in an unauthorised procession. The appeal determined the scope of "operational proportionality" in relation to human rights in Hong Kong. The defendants were sentenced to imprisonment. Lai's sentence was not suspended. He remained in prison pending other charges related to national security. Lord Neuberger (former President of the UK Supreme Court) immediately became embroiled in controversy as to his presence as an overseas non-permanent judge on the Court of Final Appeal.

In September 2024, a group claiming to be Lai's international legal team stated that they had submitted an urgent complaint to the UN Special Rapporteur on Torture. The complaint alleged that Lai receives only 50 minutes of outdoor exercise daily in prison, lacking necessary physical activity and sunlight exposure. It was also claimed that Lai, who has diabetes, has experienced weight loss since incarceration and is not receiving adequate treatment. Additionally, the team asserted that as a devout Catholic, Lai has been denied the opportunity to receive Holy Communion since the start of his trial. This complaint garnered attention from overseas media outlets.

On 27 September 2024, Robertsons, the Hong Kong law firm representing Lai, issued a statement clarifying that Lai is receiving appropriate treatment in prison. The statement emphasised that although Lai cannot see the sky directly from his cell, he can still access sunlight through the corridor windows outside his cell. Furthermore, he is allowed approximately one hour of exercise daily in a designated area. The statement also noted that Lai is aware he can receive Holy Communion through special arrangements with the Correctional Services Department, which requires a priest to hold a Mass specifically for him. However, due to the inconvenience of this arrangement, no request has yet been made by the priest.

In October 2024, presidential candidate Donald Trump, during an interview with a host who said that Lai was "very important to America's Catholics and the world's Catholics" and asked whether Trump would speak to CCP general secretary Xi Jinping about "getting Jimmy Lai out and out of the country," replied "100 per cent yes." Trump said that it would be "so easy" to free Lai from prison.

Hong Kong activist Jimmy Lai denied allegations of seeking foreign interference during his national security trial, stating he only advocated for support of Hong Kong's freedoms. If convicted, he faces life imprisonment.

During his testimony in November 2024, Lai said he might have asked U.S. officials to sanction Beijing and Hong Kong. He has been asked to explain his meetings with then-U.S. Secretary of State Mike Pompeo and vice-president Mike Pence. According to Apple Daily, on a talk show hosted by former lawmaker Albert Ho, Lai said he asked the American government to sanction certain Chinese and Hong Kong politicians. Lai has also distanced himself from the international lobbying group "Fight for Freedom, Stand with Hong Kong", saying that he only met with the group's leaders to persuade them not to resort to violence during protests. Lai's attorneys have been targeted by phishing attempts, rape threats, and death threats.

Prior to his conviction in 2026, during custody for over five years, Lai suffered health issues including heart palpitations, high blood pressure and diabetes. The government claimed he had volunteered for solitary confinement.

==== Conviction and imprisonment ====
On 15 December 2025, Hong Kong's High Court found Jimmy Lai Chee-ying guilty of collusion and sedition in his national security trial. The judge said the evidence is clear that Lai conspired with others including Apple Daily staff to undermine national security. Jimmy Lai was sentenced to 20 years in prison on 9 February 2026.

The Asia director at Human Rights Watch called the sentence a "death sentence" which was "cruel and profoundly unjust." Kevin Yam, a democracy advocate and lawyer, also criticized the ruling, declaring it "effectively a life sentence by any other name." He stated that Hong Kong was even harsher than mainland China. Taiwan's Mainland Affairs Council condemned the sentence as "harsh," stating that it "tramples on freedom of speech." Reporters Without Borders stated that the ruling underscored "the complete collapse of press freedom" and "profound contempt for independent journalism." The Committee to Protect Journalists advocated for Lai's release. Jodie Ginsberg called the decision "the final nail in the coffin for freedom of the press."

Lai's son called it a "dark day for justice" and his daughter stated that he would "die a martyr behind bars."

Lin Jian, a spokesperson for China's foreign ministry, called Lai "a key planner and participant in a series of anti-China and disruptive activities in Hong Kong" and declared that his sentencing was legitimate and legal while stating that "there is no room for argument".

On 26 February 2026, the Hong Kong Court of Appeal overturned Lai's conviction for fraud in the subletting of office space.

== Films ==
=== The Hong Konger: Jimmy Lai's Extraordinary Struggle for Freedom ===
The Hong Konger: Jimmy Lai's Extraordinary Struggle for Freedom is a documentary film produced by American think tank Acton Institute. In the film, Lai's various businesses are highlighted, and Lai is shown to prioritise freedom of speech and pro-democracy stances over pure entrepreneurial or profit motives. Jack Wolfsohn of National Review said that the film "...sends a vital message about the importance of preserving liberty and fighting tyranny."

=== The Call of the Entrepreneur ===
The Call of the Entrepreneur is a documentary produced by Cold Water Media in which Jimmy Lai is one of the main subjects. The film premiered in Grand Rapids, Michigan, US on 17 May 2007.

== Personal life ==
Lai and his first wife, Judy, had three children. She left him for another man. In 1989 he met his current wife Teresa, then a 24-year-old college student; they married two years later, and have children together.

Lai is a practising Catholic, having converted to the faith as an adult. His daughter Claire has reported that his conditions in prison deny him access to Communion.

== Awards ==
In June 2021, Lai received the 2021 Gwen Ifill Press Freedom Award from the Committee to Protect Journalists, and in December that year, together with the staff of shuttered Apple Daily, the Golden Pen of Freedom Award from the World Association of Newspapers and News Publishers. Sebastien Lai received the latter award on behalf of his incarcerated father.

In April 2022, Lai was amongst five Hong Kong citizens to be nominated for the Nobel Peace Prize for "putting his freedom on the line".

In May 2022, Lai was awarded an honorary degree from the Catholic University of America for his faith and decision to remain in Hong Kong to fight for democracy. Due to his current imprisonment, the award was accepted by Lai's son, Sebastien.

Lai was a recipient of the Washington D.C.-based Transatlantic Leadership Network's "Freedom of the Media" award in 2024.

== See also ==
- Apple Daily (Taiwan)
- Apple Daily raids and arrests
- Giordano International
- HKSAR v Lai Chee Ying & Others
- Next Digital
- One country, two systems
- List of Chinese pro-democracy activists
- Pro-democracy camp (Hong Kong)
- Special administrative regions of China
- The Epoch Times
- Falun Gong
- Guo Wengui
- Steve Bannon
