= Giordano International =

Hong Kong clothing retailer

Giordano International Limited

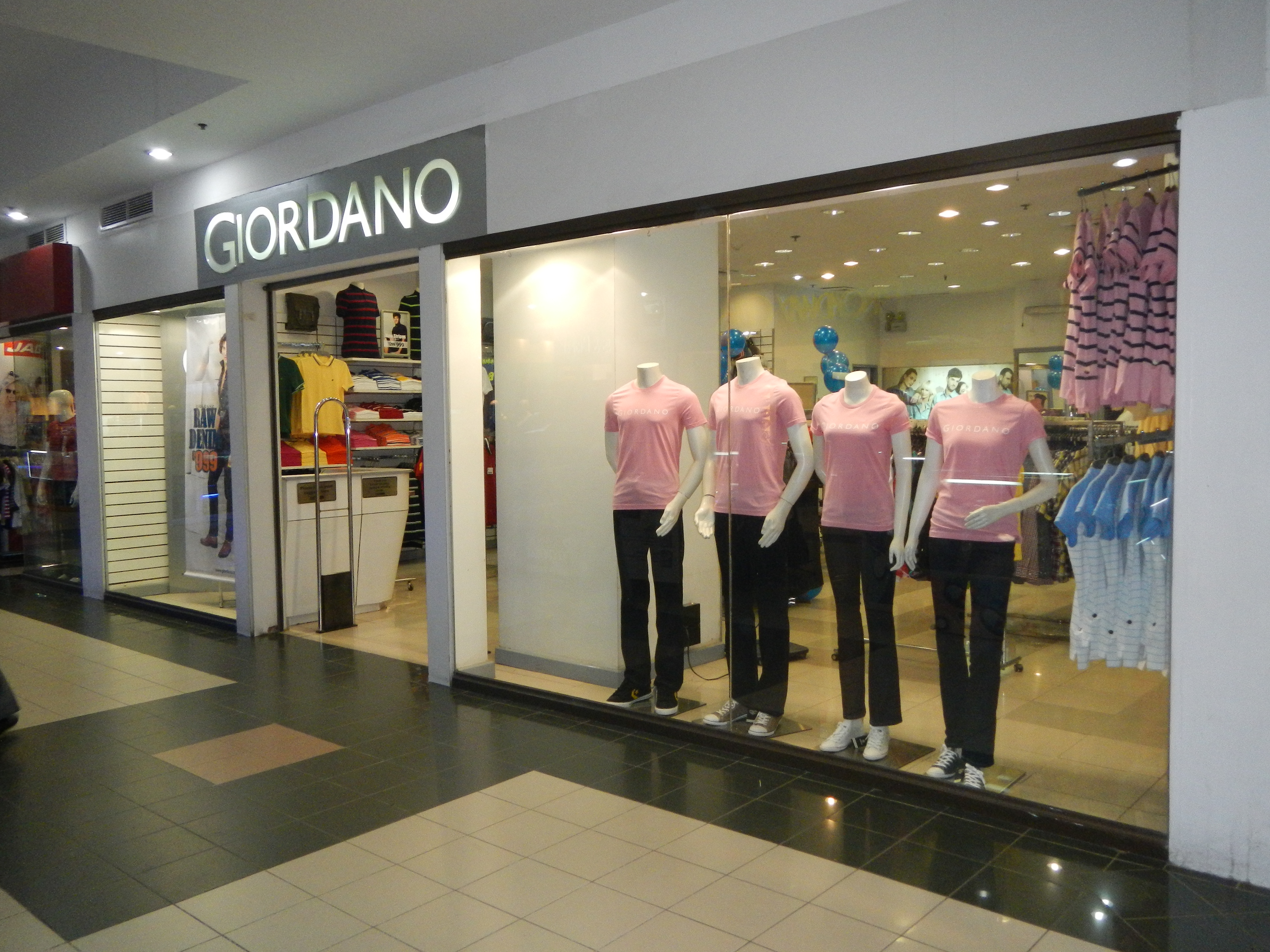
- Type: Public company
- Traded as: SEHK: 709
- Industry: Retail fashion
- Founded: 1981; 45 years ago
- Founder: Jimmy Lai
- Headquarters: Hong Kong
- Area served: Asia-Pacific; Middle East; Africa
- Key people: Colin Melville Kennedy Currie (CEO); Tsang On Tip, Patrick (Chairman)
- Products: Apparel
- Brands: Giordano, Giordano Women, Giordano Junior, Giordano Ladies, G-Motion, BSX, Beau Monde
- Revenue: ▲HK$ HK$3,873 million (2023)
- Net income: ▲HK$ HK$345 million (2023)
- Number of employees: ~6,500 (2023)
- Website: https://corp.giordano.com.hk/

Giordano International Limited is an international retailer of men's, women's and children's apparel and accessories founded in Hong Kong in 1981.

Giordano now employs over 6,500 staff, with around 1,800 shops operating in more than 30 countries and regions worldwide.

== History ==
Giordano was founded in 1981 in Hong Kong by Jimmy Lai. The inspiration for the company's name came during a business trip to New York City. Lai found himself at a Manhattan pizza shop by the same name and woke up the next day to find a napkin printed with the Giordano name in his pocket. It was decided that this name would work well as it would conjure up visions and feel of Italian fashion in the consumer's mind.

Jimmy Lai's association with the company ended in 1996. Peter Lau Kwok Kuen took over as the company's chairman and chief executive, leading Giordano until 2024.

In April 2024, former Adidas China managing director Colin Melville Kennedy Currie was appointed CEO by the family of Henry Cheng, which holds about 24.1 per cent of the company. Cheng's children, Sonia and Christopher, were also appointed non-executive directors. The move follows the Cheng family's failed attempt in 2022 to acquire full control of Giordano. As a result, the stock fell 7.4% that day.

The company now operates globally in more than 30 countries and regions worldwide, across Asia Pacific, the Middle East, Australia and Africa.

== Key international operations ==
Giordano operates around 1,800 stores in more than 30 countries.

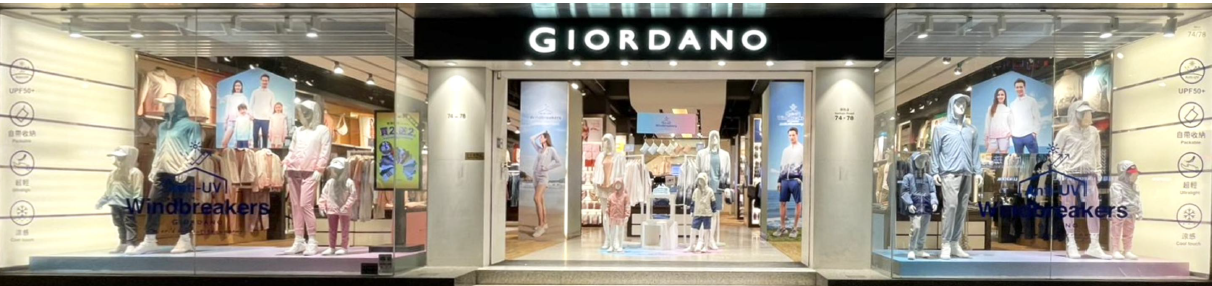
Giordano, Manson House, 2-storey Flagship Store, Tsim Sha Tsui, Hong Kong

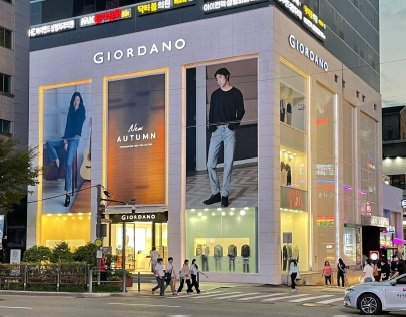
Giordano, Gangnam, 3-storey Flagship Store, Seoul, South Korea

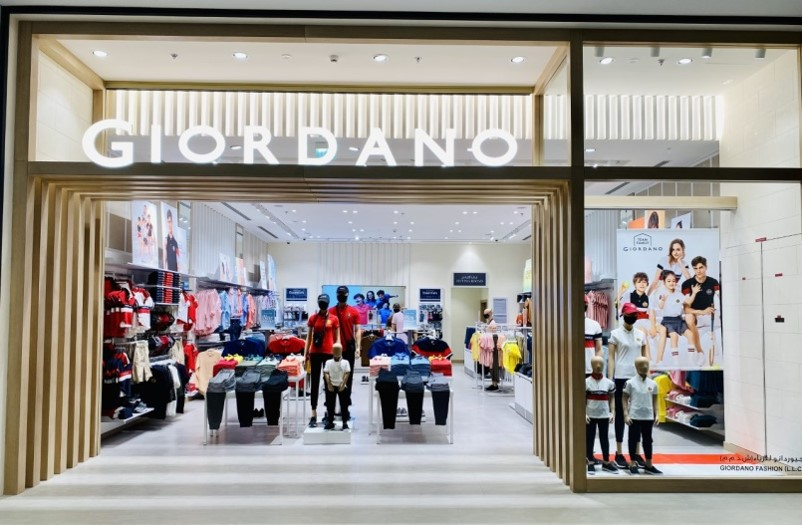
Giordano, Dubai Hills Mall, Dubai, United Arab Emirates (UAE)

=== Hong Kong ===
Giordano was founded in Hong Kong in 1981, where it is currently headquartered. The company now operates 38 shops in Hong Kong, including a two-storey flagship store in Tsim Sha Tsui.

=== Mainland China ===
Giordano entered mainland China market in 1991 and established regional office in 1992. In 1994, the Beijing shop was closed after Lai called Chinese Premier Li Peng as "son of a turtle's egg". It now operates 486 stores in all major cities in Greater China region.

=== Taiwan ===
Giordano entered Taiwan by distributing Giordano merchandise through a joint venture in 1983. Giordano operates 168 stores in Taiwan. Giordano's stores are located in Taipei City, Taichung, and Tainan.

=== Southeast Asia ===
==== Philippines ====
The first Giordano store in the Philippines opened in 1989.

==== Indonesia ====
Giordano has 238 stores in Indonesia. The brand is also available at premium locations across the country, including Jakarta and Bali.

==== Thailand ====
Giordano launched the brand through the establishment of joint ventures in 1994. The company has 156 stores in the country.

==== Singapore ====
The company entered Singapore in 1985 as Southeast Asia's first phase of expansion. The company has 30 stores in the market.

==== Vietnam and Cambodia ====
The group currently has 44 stores in Vietnam and 3 stores in Cambodia, all located in premium locations.

==== Malaysia ====
The Group entered the Malaysian market and opened its first outlet in Kuala Lumpur in 1991. In Malaysia, the brand is located in a number of premium locations, including Pavilion KL, Suria KLCC and the Exchange TRX. The group has 88 stores in Malaysia.

=== South Korea ===
The first retail store opened in 1994. Giordano's most prominent store is the three-storey flagship store in Gangnam. Other stores are located in prime locations, including Lotte World Mall. Currently, the group has 120 stores in the country.

=== India ===
Giordano first entered the Indian market in 2006, but relaunched in 2018 with a new franchise partner. The brand currently has 58 points of sale in India, mainly located in the states of Uttar Pradesh, Madhya Pradesh and Delhi.

=== Bangladesh ===
Giordano currently has six locations in Bangladesh, all located in Dhaka.

=== Gulf Cooperation Council ===
Giordano entered the Middle East market in 1995. Up to 2023, the company has 178 stores across the region in GCC. The brand is available in UAE, Saudi Arabia, Qatar, and Kuwait. The brand first launched in Dubai.

=== Africa ===
Giordano entered Africa in 2019. The company has since opened shops in Algeria, Egypt, Ghana, Kenya, and Mauritius.

== Brands ==
=== Giordano Men and Giordano Women ===
Launched in 1981, Giordano's house brand has been the company's core brand.

=== Giordano Junior ===
A kids wear line that offers children's wear.

=== Giordano Ladies ===
Designs targeting office ladies.

=== G-Motion ===
A sports and athleisure brand that offers functional lifestyle wear in 2016.

=== BSX ===
Launched in 2007, BSX is a contemporary streetwear brand.

=== Beau Monde ===
Launched in 2014, Beau Monde as the second line brand by Giordano, offers everyday clothing.
