= Raza Husain =

British King's Counsel lawyer

- Education: Exeter College, Oxford
- Occupation: human rights lawyer
- Known for: Human Rights, immigration and Palestine Action

Raza Husain KC is a British human rights lawyer who is known for his work in immigration law. He was a leading lawyer in the 2023 Supreme Court case which declared the UK government's plan to move asylum seekers to Rwanda illegal. He later supported Huda Ammori in her case to protest the government's 2025 declaration that Palestine Action was an illegal terrorist organisation.

== Life ==
Husain went to a state school and his interest in human rights is said to be more important to him than his interest in the law. He worked for Amnesty International. He had been the first person in his family to go to university and he studied law at Exeter College, Oxford in 1987. He graduated in 1990 and was called to the bar in 1993 where his special interests included immigration law.

Matrix Chambers was formed in 2000 with a number of high-profile British judges and lawyers. One of the first was Husain.

He was declared the Human Rights and Public Law Junior of the Year by Chambers Bar Awards in 2007. He successfully supported an Iranian's claim for asylum in 2010. It was agreed that the gay man faced persecution in Iran. Husain was declared "lawyer of the week". In 2010 he "took silk" and became a King's Counsel and by 2013 he was included in the top 100 lawyers.

He came to notice in 2022 when he became involved in the legalities of the UK government's plans to move asylum seekers to Rwanda. It was a high-profile case that moved from a British court to the European Court of Human Rights in three days. In 2023 he was a leading lawyer when the Supreme Court declared the UK governments Rwanda policy was illegal.

In 2025 he was the lawyer supporting Huda Ammori and her legal case to resist the government's announcement that the organisation she had co-founded, Palestine Action, was an illegal terrorist organisation. Husain argued that the new law was unfair and compared Palestine Action to the suffragettes who he said had an "equal claim to be terrorists". One the first day of the hearing nearly 150 were arrested outside the court for saying they supported Palestine Action. This brought the total number of people arrested for supporting the organisation to over 2,200.
