= Rhodri Thompson =

English barrister

Rhodri William Ralph Thompson KC
- Born: 5 May 1960 (age 66)
- Education: University College, Oxford
- Occupation: Barrister

Rhodri Thompson KC (born 5 May 1960) is an English barrister at Matrix Chambers.

== Early life ==
Rhodri Thompson was born in Farnborough, Kent.

== Education and career ==
Rhodri earned and MA (Oxon) and BPhil (Oxon) from University College, Oxford. Thomson was called to the Bar (Middle Temple) in 1989. He was a member of Monckton Chambers 1990–2000. He left in 2000 and became a founding Member of Matrix Chambers. Thomson was appointed Queen's Counsel in 2002. Rhodri is a specialist in competition law and European Community law. He is also a recognised leader in public law and sports law. He received the 2008 EU/Competition law Silk of the Year Award from Chambers and Partners.

== Professional reputation ==
- Chambers and Partners 2011 ranks Rhodri Thompson QC as a leading silk in EU/Competition law. Described as “the star competition lawyer”, Rhodri “has an enviable reputation for handling the thorniest of EU and competition issues...he is an extremely attractive advocate as he assimilates huge amounts of information easily, and presents responses in a superbly coherent way”.
- Legal 500 2010/2011 recommends Rhodri Thompson QC as a leading silk in Admin and Public law; Civil Liberties and Human Rights; EU and Competition, “tower of strength on complex matters”; and Media, Entertainment and Sport.
- Legal 500 describes Rhodri as a provider of “excellent advice”, with “excellent judgement”, and as a “tower of strength on complex matters”. According to Chambers & Partners, Rhodri is “good when under attack, which is a sign of great character and talent”.
- Legal 500 2009 recommends Rhodri as a leading silk in Competition/EU law (ranked 1st), appreciated for his “clarity of thinking and ability to structure and present complex arguments”. Griffin

== Publication ==
- Single Market for Pharmaceuticals (1994), EC Law of Competition (contrib, 4, 5 and 6 edns)
- Contributor to Bellamy & Child, Common Market Law of Competition, 4th-5th edition (on common horizontal agreements), 6th edition, 2008 (Article 82)(Sweet & Maxwell)
- "Dishonest agreements" [2003] Comp LR 94 (with Ken Macdonald QC)
- "Goodbye to the dominance test? Substantive appraisal under the new EC merger regime" [2004] Comp LJ
- "Community law and the limits of deference" [2005] EHRLR 24
