= Barbara Habberjam =

English translator

Barbara Habberjam is a prominent English translator of Gilles Deleuze's works. She often collaborates with the translator Hugh Tomlinson.

Prior to working as a translator, she had worked as a diplomat in both France and Russia.
