= Israeli Apartheid Week =

Annual series of university activities

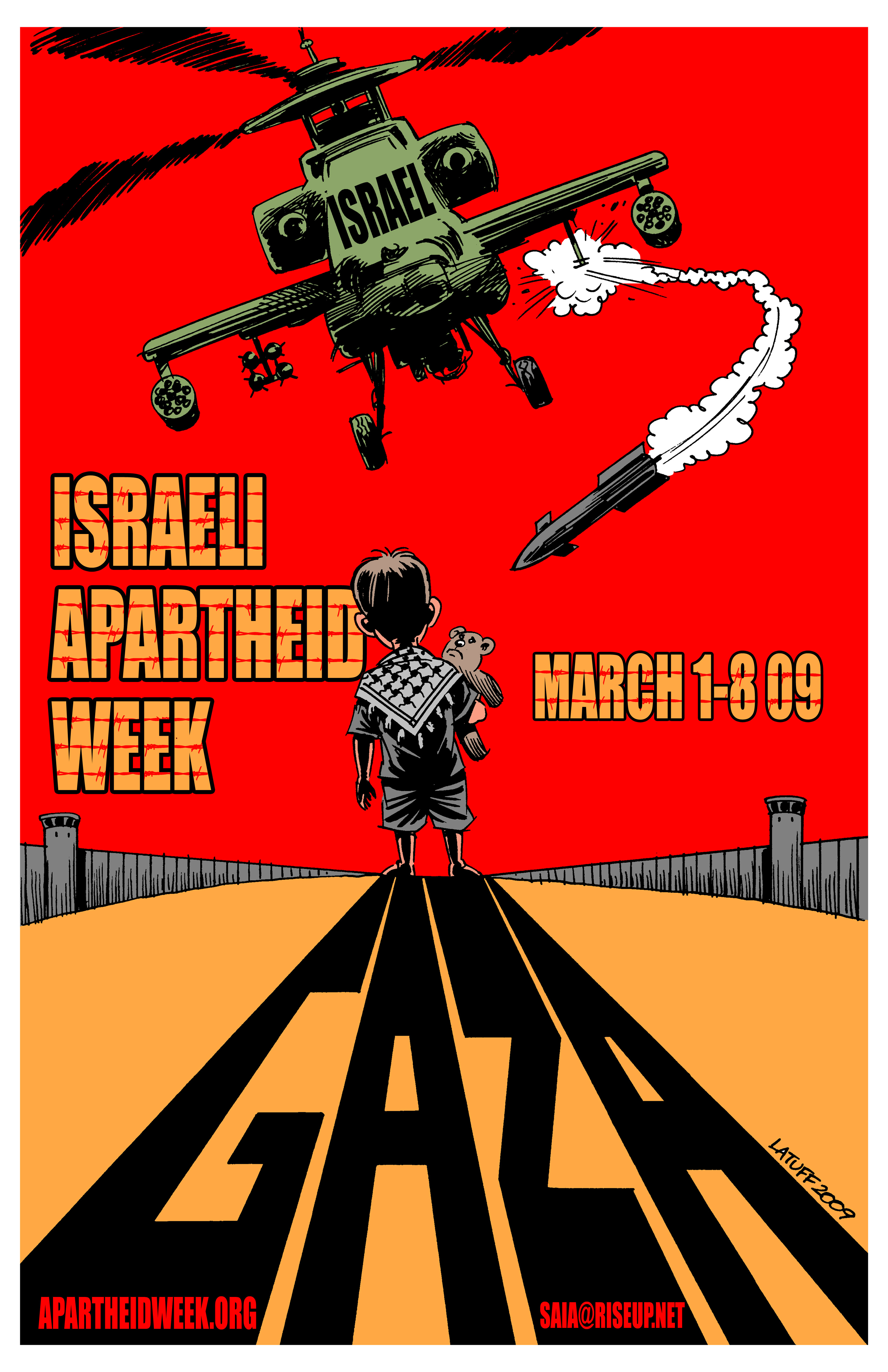
Poster for the 2009 Israeli Apartheid Week, artwork by Carlos Latuff

Israeli Apartheid Week (IAW) is an annual series of university lectures and rallies held in February or March. According to the organization, "the aim of IAW is to educate people about the nature of Israel as an apartheid system and to build Boycott, Divestment and Sanctions (BDS) campaigns as part of a growing global BDS movement." Since IAW began in Toronto in 2005, it has spread to at least 55 cities, including locations in Australia, Austria, Brazil, Botswana, Canada, France, Germany, India, Italy, Japan, Jordan, South Korea, Malaysia, Mexico, Norway, Palestine, South Africa, the United Kingdom, and the United States.

== Efficacy ==
The organizers have said the week has "played an important role in raising awareness and disseminating information about Zionism, the Palestinian liberation struggle and its similarities with the indigenous sovereignty struggle in North America and the South African anti-Apartheid movement." An international divestment campaign is also said to have gained momentum in response to the 2005 statement by over 170 Palestinian civil society organizations who called for boycotts, divestments and sanctions. They also claimed that important gains had been made in the campaign in countries like South Africa, the U.K., Canada and the U.S.

The years preceding 2008, a significant year marking the 60th anniversary of the establishment of the state of Israel, saw a sharp increase of literature and analysis that was said to have sought to document and challenge alleged Israeli apartheid, including reports by major international bodies and human rights organizations and findings published by political leaders, thinkers, academics, and activists. The efforts were also said to have highlighted the role that people and governments could play in providing "solidarity with the Palestinian struggle by exerting urgent pressure on Israel to alter its current structure and practices as an apartheid state."

=== Expanse ===
Cities and schools to have hosted an Israeli Apartheid Week include Oxford University, the University of Manchester, the University of Toronto, the University of Ottawa, Montreal, Hamilton, London, Cambridge, and Soweto, South Africa.

Speakers have included Balad MK Jamal Zahalka in 2007 and former MK Azmi Bishara, also of Balad, who began Israeli Apartheid Week 2008 with a live broadcast from Soweto.

In 2009, locations included Abu Dis, Berkeley, Boston College, Emory University, Bir Zeit, Edinburgh, Edmonton, Johannesburg, Oxford, Kalkilya, San Francisco, Soweto, Tulkarm and Washington, D.C.

In 2010, locations included Jerusalem, Amsterdam, Bard University, Beirut, Berkeley, Bethlehem, Bil'in, Bogota, Bologna, Boston, Cape Town, Caracas, Chicago, Connecticut, Duluth, Dundee, Durban, Eastern Cape, Edinburgh, Edmonton, Gaza, Glasgow, Guelph, Hamilton, Houston, Ireland, Jenin, Johannesburg, Kingston, London (Ontario), London (U.K.), Madrid, Melbourne, Minneapolis/St.Paul, Montréal, Nablus, New York City, Nil'in, Ottawa, Oxford, Peterborough, Pisa, Pretoria, Providence, Puebla, Roma, San Francisco, Seattle, Sudbury, Tilburg, Toronto, Truro (California), Utrecht, Vancouver, Waterloo and Winnipeg.

In 2014, locations included Vienna, Brussels, Ghent, Botswana, Cuiaba, Porto Alegre, São Paulo, Calgary, Edmonton, Hamilton, London, Montreal, Ottawa, Peterborough, Regina, Sudbury, Toronto, Vancouver, Waterloo, Winnipeg, Copenhagen, Helsinki, Joensuu, Bordeaux, Grenoble, Lille, Lyon, Marseille, Metz, Nantes, Paris, Strasbourg, Tours, Berlin, Freiberg, Stuttgart, Delhi, Cork, Dublin, Galway, Bologna, Cagliari, Rome, Venice, Japan, Amman, Irbid, Seoul, Kuwait, Lebanon, Malaysia, Morocco, Oslo, Jerusalem, Bethlehem, Gaza, Nablus, Naqab, Ramallah, Tulkarem, Yaffa (Jaffa), Aliwal North, Benoni, Cape Town, Durban, Fleurhof, Grahamstown, Johannesburg, Laudium, Mitchells Plain, Orange Farm, Pietermaritzburg, Polokwane, Port Elizabeth, Port Shepstone, Pretoria, Roshnee, Rustenburg, Soweto, Stellenbosch, Barcelona, Gijon, Irunea, Madrid, Palma, Sevilla, Valencia, Malmo, Stockholm, Basel, Berne, Geneva, Syria, Golan Heights, Bangkok, Birmingham, Bradford, Cambridge, Dundee, Durham, Edinburgh, Essex, Exeter, Glasgow, Kent, Lancaster, Leeds, Liverpool, Manchester, Northampton, Nottingham, Oxford, Sheffield, Southampton, Sussex, London, Albuquerque, Arizona, Beaumont, Boston, Cambridge, Chicago, Dearborn, Delaware, Louisville, Maryland, Massachusetts, Milwaukee, Minnesota, New Jersey, New York, Ohio, Olympia, Omaha, Philadelphia, Seattle, Toledo and Washington, D.C.

== Notable demonstrations and speakers ==
In 2012, the Palestine Society of the London School of Economics (LSE) erected an "Israeli Apartheid Wall", which led to a confrontation after pro-Israel students threw water balloons at it in protest.

In 2013, Harvard University's Palestine Solidarity Committee, which organizes IAW at Harvard, posted mock eviction notices on students' dorm room doors.

In 2017, Huda Ammori (who later co-founded Palestine Action) invited Marika Sherwood to Manchester University's week. Sherwood had been in Budapest's Jewish ghetto, and her talk was subtitled "You're doing to the Palestinians what the Nazis did to me." The subtitle attracted Israeli Ambassador Mark Regev's attention, and he requested that the university reconsider its support. The talk was held but the subtitle was removed.

U.S. scholar and MIT professor Noam Chomsky has spoken various times at many university campuses as part of IAW.

Ben White, a freelance journalist and author of two books on the Israeli–Palestinian conflict, has been an active speaker during IAW in both the U.S. and the U.K., including at his alma mater, Cambridge.

Israeli historian and Exeter professor Ilan Pappé has spoken at IAW events throughout the U.K.

Israeli historian and Oxford professor Avi Shlaim has given IAW speeches, including one at the London School of Economics.

== Views on the conference and its activities ==
=== Support ===
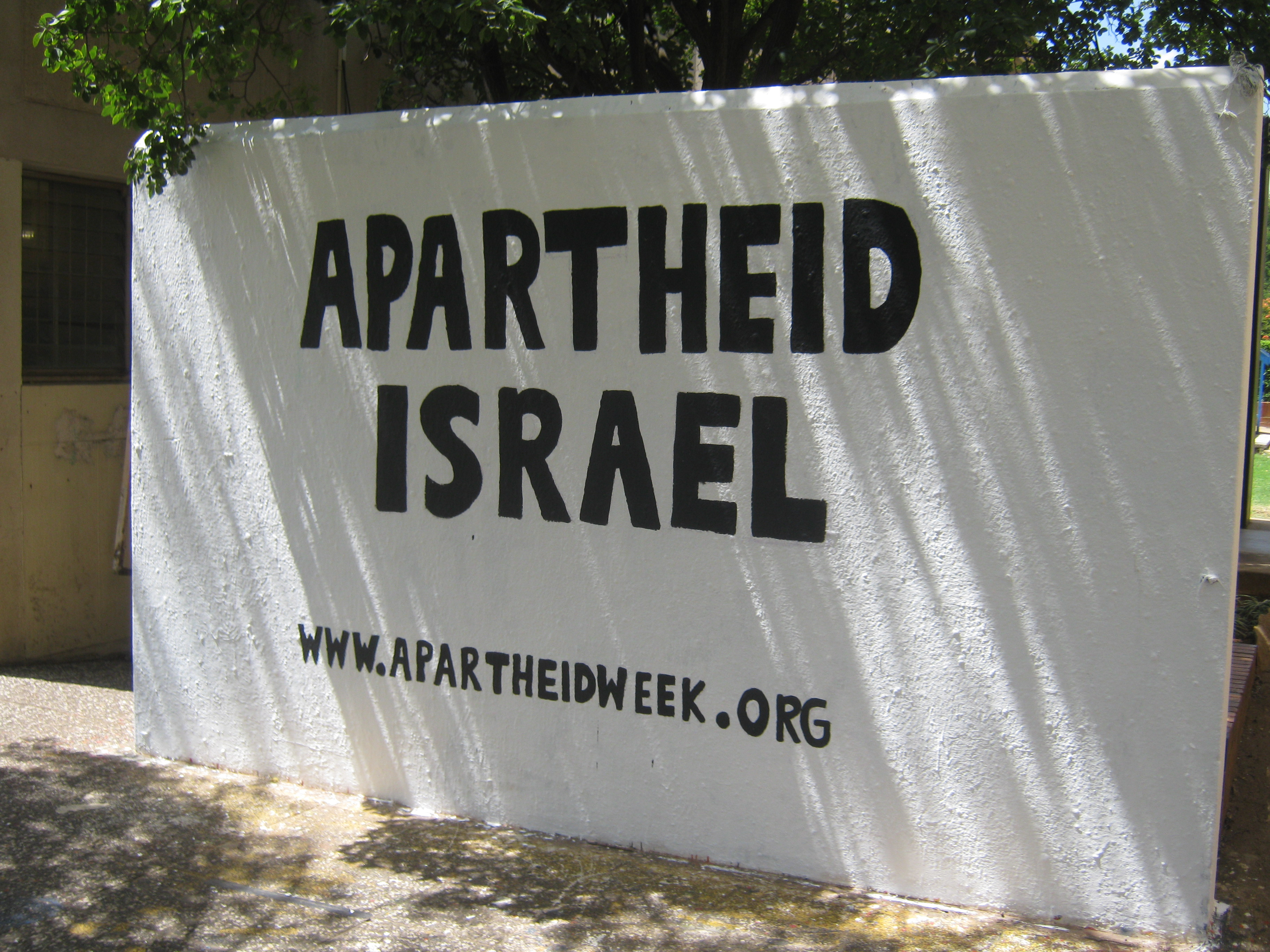
Pro-Palestine mural on a graffiti wall at the University of the Witwatersrand in Johannesburg, South Africa.

Israeli Apartheid Week events are almost always hosted by solidarity societies and organizations associated with academic institutions. Speakers at various meetings around the world support the Week's goals. An Arab citizen of Israel and member of the Knesset, Jamal Zahalka, spoke in Montréal in 2007. He said: "Calling the occupation apartheid isn’t an overstatement, it’s an understatement. The Israeli occupation in the West Bank and the Gaza Strip is worse than apartheid."

In 2014, South Africa's ruling party, the African National Congress, officially endorsed Israeli Apartheid Week. The ANC, which led the anti-apartheid movement in South Africa, said participating in that year's Apartheid Week was part of its commitment to the international anti-apartheid movement and that it remains "unequivocal in its support for the Palestinian people in their struggle for self-determination, and unapologetic in its view that the Palestinians are the victims and the oppressed in the conflict with Israel."

According to IAW organizers, there has been "a sharp increase of literature and analysis that has sought to document and challenge Israeli apartheid, including reports issued by major international bodies and human rights organizations and findings published by political leaders, thinkers, academics, and activists."

=== Reaction by university administration ===
University of Toronto president David Naylor said of IAW, "this isn't [my] favourite time of year." But he responded to objections from the Friends of the Simon Wiesenthal Center for Holocaust Studies in signing a statement that declared, "We do, in fact, recognize that the term Israeli Apartheid is upsetting to many people, [but] we also recognize that, in every society, universities have a unique role to provide a safe venue for highly charged discourse."

University of Manitoba president David Barnard, in a 2010 report to the Board of Governors about IAW, wrote that "while he had not personally attended any of the events, the events proceeded as anticipated and were orderly. He added that he had received a lot of communication from the external community regarding this and that while there were a number of people against the event, there was also support for the University's position in allowing the event to proceed." In 2011, Barnard responded publicly to complaints about IAW, saying, "Ultimately, we have an obligation to uphold the right to freedom of expression, and will not censor an individual or group for what has not yet been expressed."

In 2013, UC Berkeley spokesperson Dan Mogulof said that the campus agreed to consider clarifying its demonstration policies but would not curtail student speech. The Office for Civil Rights and a federal judge declared that the "university has no right or ability to trample on the constitutional rights of students."

=== U.S. investigation ===
In 2012, two Berkeley students filed charges that IAW events on campus had led to more antisemitism on campus. In 2013, federal officials dismissed the claim, stating, "the events did not constitute actionable harassment."

=== Criticism ===
In 2007, IAW spread to New York University, Columbia University and Hunter College in New York City. The David Project organized meetings the same week in opposition to the characterization of Israel as an apartheid state, and the American Jewish Committee Koppelman Institute on American Jewish-Israeli Relations denounced IAW, saying, "the specter of apartheid should not be raised in any form."

In 2008 Israel's ambassador to Canada, Alan Baker, denounced IAW as "crude propagandism, pure hypocrisy and cynical manipulation of the student body."

Organizers of the counterprotest said they "want to remove the connection that modern-day students have to the word apartheid and Israel and refocus it to the countries that we think really exemplify the definition of apartheid, being a policy of separation and segregation. Through a week which encompasses the themes of gender, sexual and political apartheid, we hope to get out a new message."

In February 2010, 30 members of the Ontario provincial legislature voted to condemn IAW as "odious, hateful and inappropriate." The largely symbolic vote received support from all three of Ontario's political parties.

Gay columnist and pornographic film producer Michael Lucas has called IAW "a hate group" and "a group of antisemites." In 2011, he brought about the cancellation of a planned event involving IAW and New York's LGBT Center after threatening to organize a boycott of large donors to the center. He said of his achievement that it was a landmark moment in his life, of which he was enormously proud.

In advance of the 2011 IAW, the Israeli government chose a group of Israelis, including Arabs, gays, Ethiopian Jews and an MTV "VJ" (presenter) to oppose the apartheid analogy by going on a speaking tour of the U.S.; another group went to Britain "to combat anti-Israel messages students there are receiving from Israel Apartheid Week activities."

On March 3, 2011, Historian Catherine Chatterley wrote an editorial for the National Post outlining IAW's history and its relationship to the BDS movement.

That same month, various Canadian government and other political figures, including Prime Minister Stephen Harper, Immigration Minister Jason Kenney and Liberal Leader Michael Ignatieff, criticized IAW. Kenney said he was "deeply concerned about the events and activities" associated with IAW and that the event was "all too often [...] accompanied by anti-Semitic harassment, intimidation and bullying." He added that students participating in IAW were "free [...] to speak their mind" but encouraged them to "reflect on whether these activities are beneficial." Ignatieff said IAW is a "dangerous cocktail of ignorance and intolerance" that threatens "the mutual respect" of Canadian society. Kenney has also accused IAW's organizers of using "the cover of academic freedom to demonize and de-legitimize the state of Israel. This week is nothing more than an unbalanced attempt to paint Israel and her supporters as racist. I call on all Canadians to reject anti-Semitism and all forms of racism, discrimination and intolerance." Conservative MP David Anderson said that calling Israel an apartheid state is "abhorrent", and interim Liberal leader Bob Rae said the campaign "continues to defy logic. This year the focus continues to be on Israel, rather than on the appalling massacres and human rights violations that have reached intolerable heights in countries such as Syria and Iran."

In April 2011, 16 African-American members of the Vanguard Leadership Group published full-page ads in several U.S. university newspapers with an "Open Letter to Students for Justice in Palestine" saying that the SJP's use of the word "apartheid" in regard to Israel and IAW "is not only false, but offensive."

Stuart Appelbaum, president of the Retail, Wholesale and Department Store Union, said that groups opposing the New York LGBT Center's decision to prohibit a 2011 IAW event were intellectually dishonest, saying, "This was not a question of free speech. This was hate speech. The center should not be used as a venue for racism, Islamophobia or anti-Semitism. Nor did they even care about free speech. The same groups have consistently sought to ban and prevent supporters of Israel from expressing their views."

In February 2012, the Public Diplomacy Ministry of Israel created the "Faces of Israel" mission to the U.S., Canada, Ireland, Spain, Great Britain, and South Africa, comprising 100 Israelis including "settlers, Arabs, artists, experts in national security, gay people, and immigrants from Ethiopia" and actor Aki Avni, in order to "represent and defend the state during Israel Apartheid Week."

In February 2012, Jonathan Kay sharply criticized IAW in the National Post, writing, "In Syria, the Assad regime continues to rain artillery on rebel positions in the city of Homs, killing journalists and innocent civilians alike. Iran's mullahs are set to execute a Canadian citizen for the crime of operating a website they don't like. The new Libyan regime is torturing Gaddafi loyalists. And Egypt's rulers are prosecuting NGO leaders on trumped up charges. And so next week, Canadian left-wing activists will congregate in Toronto to express their hatred of ... you guessed it: Israel." In the same article, Kay commented that not all IAW activists "seek the outright destruction of Israel—[but] many certainly do. Some are merely naïve undergraduates. ... But all of them should understand that IAW and BDS are not what they seem: As some of Israel's own fiercest critics themselves now admit, these are dishonest cults meant to enlist ill-informed activists in a campaign to destroy the Jewish state."

In 2013, the University of Manitoba Students' Union (UMSU) in Winnipeg became the world's first student government to revoke Students Against Israeli Apartheid's student group status and ban it from using student union spaces. The council passed the motion banning the group after hearing evidence that Students Against Israel Apartheid and its Israel Apartheid Week violated student union policies by "undermining the dignity and self esteem of students on campus".

In 2019, the Principal of King's College London, Ed Byrne, said that he "abhorred" Israeli Apartheid Week.

== See also ==
- Economic and political boycotts of Israel
- Israel and apartheid
