= Huda Ammori =

British activist (born 1994)

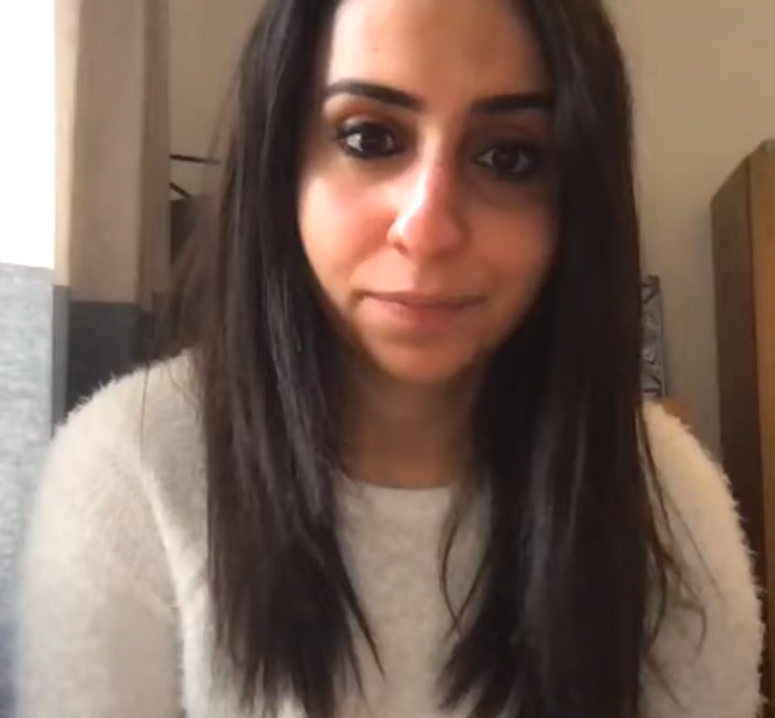
- In a 2020 video
- Born: 17 March 1994 (age 32); Bradford, West Yorkshire, England
- Citizenship: British
- Education: University of Manchester
- Occupation: Activist
- Known for: Co-founding Palestine Action and challenging the organisation's proscription

Huda Ammori (born 17 March 1994) is a British activist and co-founder of the group Palestine Action. The UK government proscribed the group a terrorist organisation in 2025 and US government did the same in 2026; by October, over 2000 people had been arrested on terrorism charges. She has challenged the lawfulness of the proscription in the High Court of Justice, which in February 2026 ruled that the proscription was unlawful. The government said it would appeal. The Court of Appeal ruled that the proscription was lawful on 15 June 2026. On 30 July 2026, the Supreme Court announced that Ammori has been given permission to appeal against the court of appeal's decision as it was arguable that the ban represented a disproportionate interference with articles 10 and 11 of the European convention on human rights, and that the case would be heard by the Supreme Court in the final quarter of 2026.

== Biography ==
=== Early life ===
Ammori was born in Bradford, West Yorkshire to a Palestinian father, Basil Ammori, and an Iraqi mother, Almira Al-Abadi, a surgeon and a doctor respectively, and grew up in Bolton, Greater Manchester. In an interview, Ammori described her family history, stating that her paternal family had been displaced during the 1967 Naksa when her father was a child, that the family home was attacked, forcing him to flee to Iraq, and that her great-grandfather was shot by British soldiers following a 1936 uprising, after which the family home was destroyed.

=== Education and early work ===
In 2015, Ammori volunteered at a refugee camp in Lesbos. Upon returning to the UK, she studied international business, finance and economics at the University of Manchester. Later, after learning of her university's investment in the trade and manufacturing of weapons for Israel, she founded the Manchester University chapter of the international Boycott, Divestment and Sanctions (BDS) Movement. The group led a number of successful boycott campaigns.

In 2017, Ammori organised a talk at the University of Manchester by Marika Sherwood, as part of Israeli Apartheid Week, titled "A Holocaust survivor's story and the Balfour declaration". Sherwood's talk was subtitled "You're doing to the Palestinians what the Nazis did to me", and recounted her time in the Budapest Ghetto. After meeting with the Israeli Ambassador to the United Kingdom, Mark Regev, the University of Manchester requested that the subtitle be removed and imposed additional conditions on the event. The university also replaced the event chairs with their own appointees. In response to these events coming to light, Ammori said, "In educational institutions there shouldn't be any sort of lobbying from foreign governments." Ammori graduated from the University of Manchester in 2018.

=== Palestine Solidarity Campaign ===
After graduating in 2018, Ammori joined the Palestine Solidarity Campaign (PSC) as a Campaigns Officer. In this role, she helped organise BDS campaigns around the country and took part in lobbying MPs to commit to an arms embargo on Israel. However, she grew frustrated and eventually quit as "you're constantly trying to reason with people, with the facts, and what you get back is nothing and the complicity continues".

=== Palestine Action ===
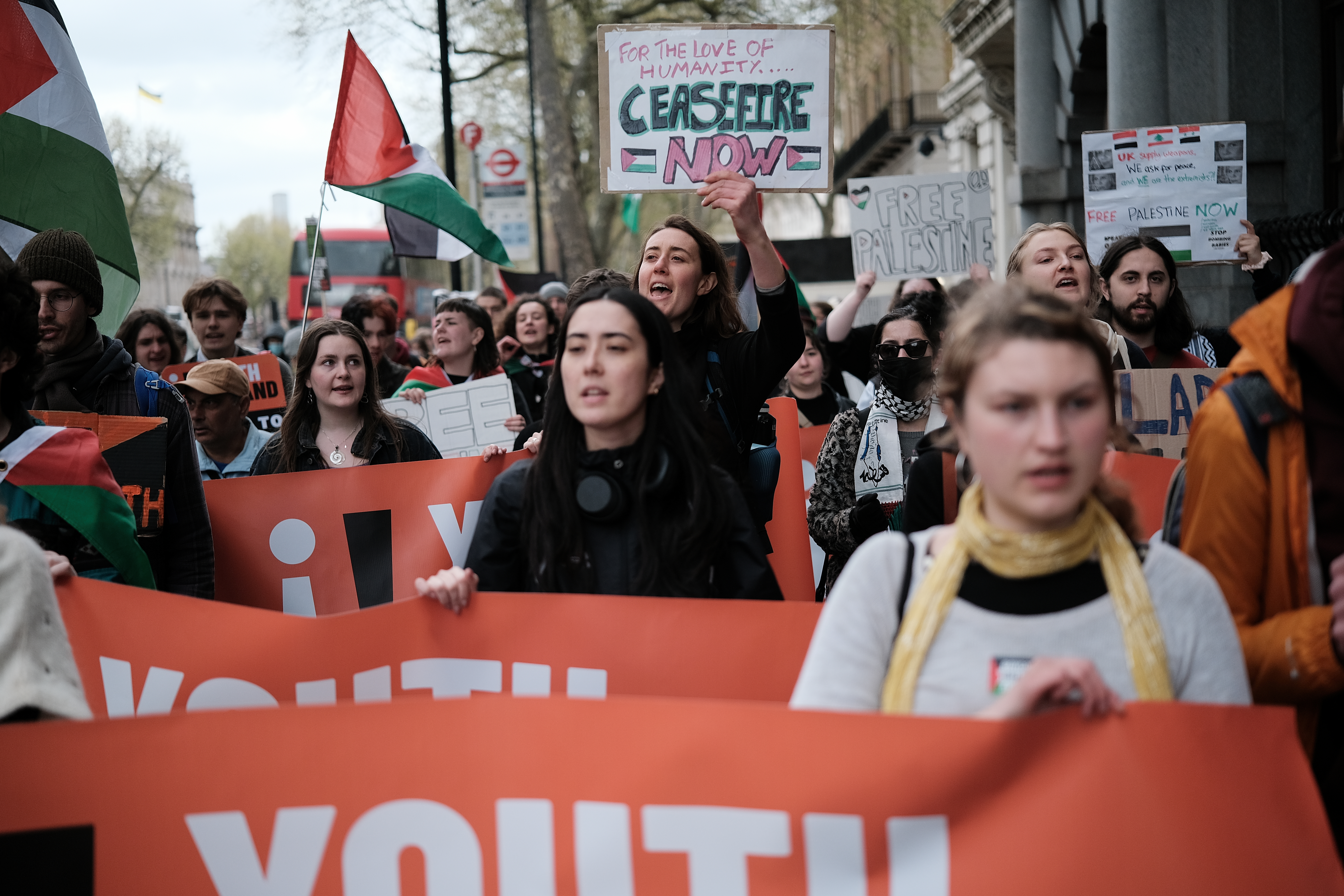
Woolwich April 2024 Activists from Palestine Action and Youth Demand.

In 2020, Ammori co-founded the direct action group Palestine Action with Richard Barnard, modelled on Extinction Rebellion. She organised several protests against the manufacturers of arms for the Israeli military, especially company Elbit Systems.

On 23 June 2025, following an attack that damaged two RAF aircraft at RAF Brize Norton, Home Secretary Yvette Cooper said she intended to declare Palestine Action a proscribed terrorist organisation, saying the protests at defence sites threatened national security. Lawyers for Palestine Action said the ban was unprecedented, as no protest organisation had ever been proscribed before under the Terrorism Act 2000. The government's proposal passed a vote on 30 June.

On 5 July, the proscription came into effect. In response to the ban, Ammori said the government was "hugely overreaching", with penalties for carrying a placard starting from 14 days' imprisonment without charge.

After Ammori launched a legal challenge to the ban, the government argued her appeal should not be heard by the courts as they had designed an alternative route of appeal within the legislation—their route would give her an appeal the following year. Judge Chamberlain rejected six of Ammori's requests, but he upheld that a judicial review was permitted.

Ammori's case was the first time a group proscribed as a terrorist organisation had successfully made a challenge in a British court. The judge said the government's proscription of the group may create "considerable harm to the public interest" and to permitted political speech.

In August, the Home Secretary Yvette Cooper accused Palestine Action of being a violent organisation. In response, Ammori said the government's claims were defamatory and untrue. She quoted the government's own analysis, conducted by the Joint Terrorism Analysis Centre (JTAC), which said it believed that "Palestine Action does not advocate for violence against persons". She said the organisation had been banned for "serious property damage for a political cause" rather than violence, as the Home Office had claimed.

In September 2025, the Home Office's appeal against the judgment was heard. Judgment was expected in October. As of 5 October 2025, over 2,100 people have been arrested for supporting Palestine Action and hundreds have been charged. Amnesty International has said mass arrests conducted after the ban were "deeply concerning".

Baroness Sue Carr in the Court of Appeal sided with Ammori in mid October. By this time over 2,100 people had been arrested. Carr blocked an application by the government to prevent Ammori from appealing the decision using normal procedures rather than the government's recommended (slower) route. She said it was a "quicker means of challenging the order proscribing Palestine Action, than applying to deproscribe". Moreover she claimed the case has "backfired spectacularly" as the court allowed Ammori to add additional grounds to appeal the Home Office's ban.

A judicial review took place in late November and she was defended by Raza Husain who was a King's Counsel specialising in immigration law. He compared Palestine Action to the suffragettes who he said had an equal claim to be terrorists.

In February 2026, the High Court ruled that the proscription was unlawful and contravened the Human Rights Act. However, the government intended to appeal.

In June 2026, the Court of Appeal ruled that the government's proscription of Palestine Action as a terror organisation is lawful.
