= Matrix Chambers =

International legal services provider

- Headquarters: Gray's Inn, London, England
- Offices: London, Geneva, Brussels
- No. of lawyers: Over 100 practitioners
- Major practice areas: General practice
- Date founded: 2000
- Website: www.matrixlaw.co.uk

Matrix Chambers is a legal services provider based in Gray's Inn London, England, with offices in Brussels and Geneva. Founded in April 2000 by 22 barristers from 7 different chambers, it has since expanded has over 100 lawyers who work throughout the UK and internationally. Matrix focuses on criminal law, constitutional law and human rights.

== History ==
Matrix was founded in May 2000 before the implementation of the Human Rights Act in October. The Independent reported that the chambers "was being set up with many of the leading and most high-profile barristers in the area of human rights – who had all been headhunted." Founding members included David Bean, Nicholas Blake, Cherie Booth, James Crawford, Ben Emmerson, Robin Knowles, Raza Husain Thomas Linden, Rabinder Singh, and Rhodri Thompson.

Other members include: Lord Brennan, Lord Hermer, Conor Gearty, Lord Macdonald of River Glaven, Clare Montgomery, Tim Owen, Philippe Sands, Hugh Tomlinson, Takis Tridimas, Ben Silverstone, Helen Mountfield, and Alex Bailin.

== Practice areas ==
- Commercial Law
- Competition and EU
- Crime
- Employment Law
- International Arbitration
- Investigations
- Media and Information Law
- Public International Law
- Public Law
