= Tim Owen (barrister) =

Welsh barrister

Tim Owen KC
- Born: England
- Education: London School of Economics and Political Science; United World College of the Atlantic
- Occupation: Barrister
- Spouses: Jemma Redgrave (m. 1992; div. 2020) Wei Du (m. 2020)
- Children: 2
- Family: Owen, Redgrave

Tim Owen KC is an English barrister at Matrix Chambers. His practice spans the fields of fraud/regulatory, criminal, public, human rights, media and information, extradition/MLA, sports, asset recovery, police and civil law.

In addition to his practice at the Bar, he sits as a Deputy High Court Judge in the Administrative Court, is an Acting Judge to the Grand Court of the Cayman Islands and a Member of the Sports Resolutions Panel of Arbitrators and Mediators. He is a founder member of Matrix Chambers and a Master of the Bench of Middle Temple.

== Education and career ==
Educated at United World College of the Atlantic and London School of Economics, Owen was called to the Bar in 1983. He was appointed Queen's Counsel in 2000. He is currently a member of Matrix Chambers.

== Cases ==
=== Rurik Jutting ===
In 2016, Owen defended Rurik Jutting, a British banker who confessed to torturing and killing two Indonesian women in Hong Kong, arguing diminished responsibility. The trial evidence included videos of torture that Jutting recorded on his phone. They were deemed so traumatising that journalists and the public were barred from seeing them. Jutting was convicted of murder and sentenced to life in prison.

=== Jimmy Lai ===
In late 2022, Jimmy Lai's request to instruct Owen as part of his defense team in the case HKSAR v Lai Chee Ying & Others was appealed by Hong Kong Secretary for Justice Paul Lam and the Department of Justice multiple times. On 30 December, the Standing Committee of the 13th National People's Congress of China interpreted Articles 14 and 47 of the 2020 Hong Kong national security law, specifying that when there is a dispute regarding whether overseas lawyers or barristers without full local practice qualifications can participate in national security cases, the Hong Kong courts should obtain a certificate from the Chief Executive, or that the Committee for Safeguarding National Security of Hong Kong should make a judgment.

== Personal life ==
Tim Owen was married to actress Jemma Redgrave, between 1992 and 2020. They have two sons, Gabriel, born in 1994, and Alfie, born in 2000.

He married Hong Kong-based journalist Wei Du in 2020.

== Publications ==
- Prison Law, 5th edition (OUP, 2015)
- Asset Recovery: Criminal Confiscation and Civil Recovery (OUP, 2021) co-editor
- Blackstone's Criminal Practice 2021 (Advisory editor)
- Halsbury's Laws, vol 36(2), Prisons and Prisoners (Butterworths, 1999)
- Criminal Proceedings, Police Powers and the Human Rights Act 1998 (OUP, 2000) contributing author
