= Bajaj (surname) =

Bajaj is an Indian surname use by the Hindus of Arora, Bania and Khatri castes, as well as by the Jains and the Sikhs of Punjab and Rajasthan.

== Origin ==
The surname Bajaj might have originated from the Punjabi word Bəjāj or Bəzāz ‘clothier’, or from Arabic word Bazzāz.

== Notable people ==
Notable people with this surname include:

- Aarti Bajaj, Indian film editor
- Abhishek Bajaj, Indian actor
- Ajeet Bajaj, first Indian to ski to the North Pole
- Ashok Bajaj, restaurateur based in Washington, D.C.
- Jamnalal Bajaj (1884–1942), Indian businessman, founder of the Bajaj Group
- Janaki Devi Bajaj (1893–1979), Indian independence activist and wife of Jamnalal Bajaj
- Rahul Bajaj (1938–2022), Indian businessman, grandson of Jamnalal Bajaj, former chairman of Bajaj Auto, and former Member of Parliament, Rajya Sabha
- Rahul Bajaj, Indian golfer, 2010 Asian Games silver medalist
- Sheena Bajaj, Indian actress
