= List of Marwari businesses =

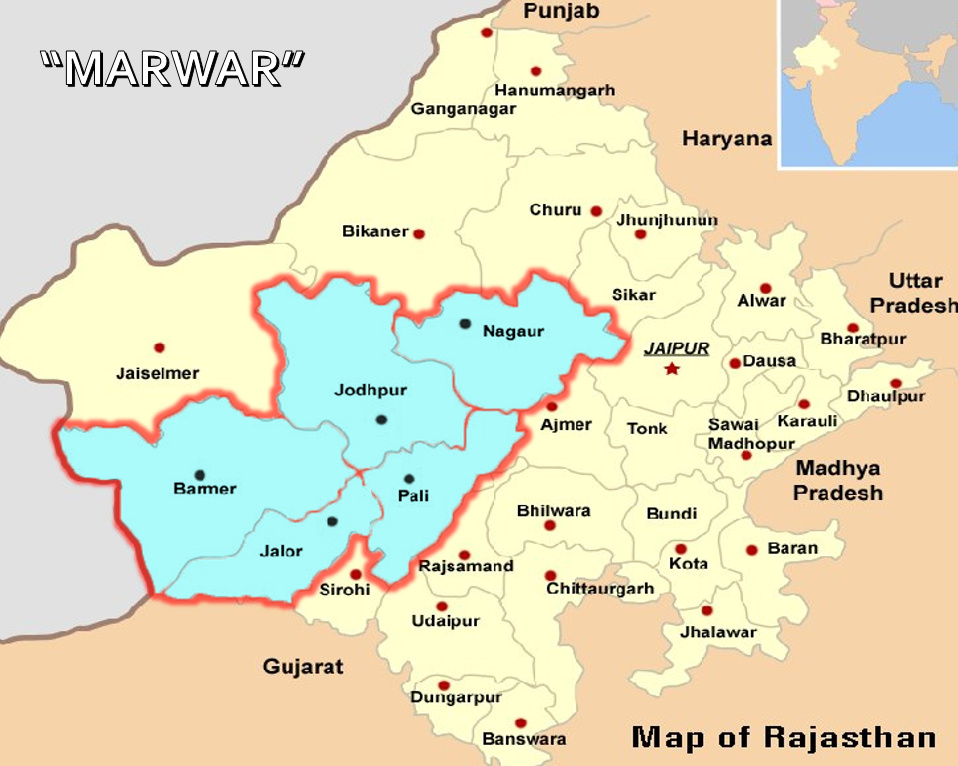
Marwar region is the areas near Jodhpur.

Marwari people are business-oriented people from the Northern Indian Marwar, Shekhawati region who were traders during the era of Rajput kingdoms and later participated in industrialization of India. Today, they own some of the largest business groups and companies in India.

Shekhawati includes Jhunjhunu, Sikar and Churu districts.

Following is the list of businesses owned and operated by Marwari families:

== A ==
- ABG Shipyard
- Aditya Birla Group
  - Birla Corporation
  - Grasim Industries
  - Hindalco Industries
  - Idea Cellular
  - UltraTech Cement
- ArcelorMittal
- Ather Energy
- AU Small Finance Bank

== B ==
- Bajaj Group
  - Bajaj Auto
  - Bajaj Electricals
  - Bajaj Finance
  - Mukand
- Balkrishna Industries
- Big Bazaar

== C ==
- Chambal Fertilisers
- CK Birla Group
- Cosmo Films

== D ==
- Dalmia Group
- DMart

== E ==
- Emami
- Essar Group
  - Essar Shipping
- Essel
  - Essel Propack
  - Zee Entertainment Enterprises

== F ==
- Future Group

== I ==
- India Infoline
- IndiaMART
- The Indian Express
- Indigo Airlines

== J ==
- Jain Irrigations Systems Ltd.
- Jindal Steel and Power
- JSW Group
  - JSW Energy
  - JSW Ispat Steel
- Jubliant Foodworks

== L ==
- Lenskart
- Lodha Group
- Lupin Limited

== M ==
- Motilal Oswal Group

== O ==
- OYO Rooms

== P ==
- Paytm
- Piramal Group

== R ==
- Rajasthan Patrika
- Raymond Group
- RP-Sanjiv Goenka Group
- RPG Group
  - CEAT
  - CESC Limited
- Rupa Company

== S ==
- Shree Cement
- Snapdeal
- Supreme Industries

== T ==
- Times of India

== U ==
- Urban Ladder

== V ==
- Vardhman Group of Companies
  - Vardhman Textiles
- Varun Beverages
- Vedanta Resources
  - Cairn India
  - Hindustan Zinc
- Videocon Group
  - Videocon Telecom

== W ==
- Welspun Group
  - Welspun Corp
  - Welspun India
- Westlife Foodworld
