= Sunaina Kejriwal =

Indian art curator (1971–2024)

- Born: 31 July 1971
- Died: 5 October 2024 (aged 53); Mumbai, India
- Occupation: Art curator
- Organization: Kamalnayan Bajaj Hall and Art Gallery
- Spouse: Manish Kejriwal
- Children: 2
- Father: Rahul Bajaj
- Relatives: See Bajaj Family

Sunaina Kejriwal (née Bajaj, 31 July 1971– 5 October 2024) was an Indian art curator.

== Early life and education ==
Kejriwal (nee Bajaj) was born to Rahul Bajaj and Ruparani Bajaj. She was the younger sister of billionaire businessmen Rajiv Bajaj and Sanjiv Bajaj and the great-granddaughter of founder Jamnalal Bajaj.

She graduated from SNDT Women's University in Pune with a degree in textiles and specialised in home science. She also completed courses in silk screen printing at Sophia College for Women and in Modern & Contemporary Indian Art and Curatorial Studies at Dr. Bhau Daji Lad Museum.

== Career ==
She was the art curator at Kamalnayan Bajaj Hall and Art Gallery.

== Curated exhibitions ==
- Spanda: Reverberations of the Cosmos, by Seema Lisa Pandya, January 2024.
- Healing Through The Arts, March 2023.
- I Want Tomorrow: Investigating Mental Health through Art by Arshiya Lokhandwla, April 2022.
- The Future is Here, January 2019.

== Personal life ==
She married Manish Kejriwal, the former head of Temasek India, and they became parents to two children.

== Death ==
Kejriwal died on 5 October 2024, after suffering from cancer for three years, at the age of 53.
