= Global Finance & Technology Network =

Singapore nonprofit organization

- Predecessor: Elevandi
- Founder: Monetary Authority of Singapore
- Type: Nonprofit organization
- Purpose: Fintech
- Headquarters: Singapore
- Region served: Global
- Key people: Ravi Menon, Chairman; Neil Parekh (NMP), Deputy Chairman; Leong Sing Chiong (Deputy MD, MAS), Deputy Chairman; Sopnendu Mohanty, Group CEO; Pat Patel, James Boey, Pieter Franken (Regional CEOs); Queen Máxima, Chair, International Advisory Board; Sanjiv Bajaj, Advisor; Agustín Carstens, Advisor; Paula Ingabire, Advisor; Dominic Barton, Advisor; Patrick Njoroge, Advisor; Veerathai Santiprabhob, Advisor; Axel A. Weber, Advisor; Eric Jing, Advisor
- Website: GFTN; GFTN Odisha

Global Finance & Technology Network (GFTN) (formerly Elevandi) is a Singapore-based nonprofit organisation created by the Monetary Authority of Singapore (MAS) in 2024 to support the development of the global fintech ecosystem.

GFTN is one of the organisers of the Singapore FinTech Festival, an annual international fintech event.

GFTN serves as a global platform for collaboration among regulators, financial institutions, technology firms, and academic institutions, with a focus on policy dialogue, innovation, capacity building, and cross-border ecosystem development.

The organisation succeeded Elevandi, a MAS-initiated nonprofit founded in 2021, and expanded its mandate beyond convening major fintech events to include several core initiatives: providing advisory and research services, operating digital platforms for (SMEs), facilitating international fintech corridors, and managing an investment fund for technology startups.

Former MAS managing director Ravi Menon was appointed Chairman of GFTN, while Queen Máxima of the Netherlands, the United Nations Secretary-General’s Special Advocate for Inclusive Finance for Development, was appointed Chair of its International Advisory Board in July 2025.

== History ==
=== Elevandi (2021–2024) ===
Elevandi was established by the Monetary Authority of Singapore in August 2021 as a nonprofit organisation to foster dialogue between the public and private sectors on financial technology and the digital economy. It served as the organiser of major international fintech events, including the Singapore FinTech Festival, and focused on advancing regulatory cooperation, innovation, and financial inclusion through technology.

=== Establishment of GFTN (2024–present) ===
In October 2024, MAS announced the creation of the Global Finance & Technology Network to succeed Elevandi and expand its scope. The move reflected a strategic shift toward a more globally distributed model, with GFTN designed to operate international hubs, support cross-border fintech collaboration, and extend Singapore's fintech engagement worldwide.

GFTN was established as a not-for-profit organisation and continues to work closely with MAS on industry and policy dialogues in areas such as payments, asset tokenisation, artificial intelligence, and emerging technologies.

== Organisation and governance ==
=== Board of Directors ===
The board of directors is responsible for the governance and strategic oversight of GFTN. It is chaired by Ravi Menon, the former managing director of the Monetary Authority of Singapore (MAS) from 2011 to 2024. Menon, who is also Singapore's Ambassador for Climate Action, has extensive international policy experience, having served on the Financial Stability Board steering committee and as chair of the Network for Greening the Financial System.

The board is supported by two Deputy Chairs:

- Leong Sing Chiong, Deputy Managing Director of the Monetary Authority of Singapore (MAS).
- Neil Parekh, a Nominated Member of Parliament in Singapore and Non-Executive Chairman of Tikehau Capital.

=== Executive Committee ===
The executive committee oversees GFTN's day-to-day operations and regional business lines. It is led by Group Chief Executive Officer Sopnendu Mohanty, who previously served as Chief FinTech Officer of the Monetary Authority of Singapore, where he played a key role in developing Singapore's fintech ecosystem and international regulatory engagement.

=== International Advisory Board ===
GFTN's International Advisory Board provides strategic guidance on global policy engagement and ecosystem development. It is chaired by Queen Máxima of the Netherlands (appointed July 2025).

Other members include:

- Sanjiv Bajaj, chairman and managing director of Bajaj Finserv
- Agustín Carstens, former General Manager of the Bank for International Settlements
- Paula Ingabire, Rwanda's Minister of ICT and Innovation
- Dominic Barton, Chairman of LeapFrog Investments and Rio Tinto; former Global Managing Partner of McKinsey & Company
- Patrick Njoroge, former Governor of the Central Bank of Kenya
- Veerathai Santiprabhob, former Governor of the Bank of Thailand
- Axel A. Weber, former Chairman of UBS Group AG and former President of Deutsche Bundesbank
- Eric Jing, Chairman of Ant Group

== Global activities ==
GFTN develops international hubs and cross-border corridors to support fintech policy alignment, innovation and ecosystem development. Key initiatives include:

India: The “Integrated Global Financial Technology Capability Hub” (I-GFTCH) in Bhubaneswar, Odisha, launched in July 2025 in partnership with the Government of Odisha and the Asian Institute of Digital Finance (AIDF). The hub focuses on digital public infrastructure, talent development and innovation-led growth.

Middle East, North Africa and Central Asia: A centre of excellence in Qatar, developed with the Qatar Development Bank, acts as a regional hub for policy development, financial inclusion and SME support. It forms part of GFTN's wider corridor strategy linking Singapore with the Gulf Cooperation Council (GCC), North Africa and Central Asia.

Europe and East Asia: Satellite offices in Japan and Germany support regulatory engagement, innovation communities and multi-country policy alignment.

Outreach and training: GFTN and AIDF collaborate on skills-based technology training programmes across multiple regions. Its predecessor Elevandi supported educational initiatives, including an artificial intelligence lecture for a Sri Lankan school in 2024. GFTN Insights educational resources were used during a guest lecture at the University of Kelaniya, Sri Lanka, as part of the Fintech Association of Sri Lanka's National AI Awareness Programme in 2026.
