= Ramkrishna Bajaj =

Indian businessman and freedom fighter

- Born: 22 September 1923; Wardha, British India
- Died: 21 September 1994 (aged 70); Mumbai, India
- Organization: Bajaj Group
- Movement: Quit India Movement
- Spouse: Vimla Bajaj
- Parent(s): Jamnalal Bajaj, Janaki Devi Bajaj
- Family: Kamalnayan Bajaj (brother)

Ramkrishna Bajaj (1923―1994) was an Indian businessman and freedom fighter who was a close associate of Mahatma Gandhi. He used to describe himself as 'Mahatma Gandhi's coolie'. He spent four years in jail from 1942 to 1946 for participating in the Quit India Movement. He was the head of the Bajaj Group of Industries and served as the chairman of the Jamnalal Bajaj Foundation and Jamnalal Bajaj Seva Trust.

== Biography ==
He was born on 22 September 1923 in Wardha, British India. He studied at the Navabharat Vidyalaya, Wardha, after spending a few years in Sabarmati Ashram. Bajaj left his studies to take part in the freedom struggle.

At 18, he participated in an Individual Satyagraha along with Mahatma Gandhi. Ramkrishna Bajaj spent four years in prison from 1942 to 1946. He learned Sanskrit from Vinoba Bhave when he was in Nagpur jail. In 1946, he founded the All India Student Congress (AISC) and the National Union of Student in 1948. He led the Youth Congress delegation to the Union of Soviet Socialist Republics (USSR) in 1958 and Indian Youth Delegation to the US in 1959.

Ramkrishna Bajaj was elected as the chairman of the World Assembly for Youth (India) in 1961. He also served as the Managing Trustee of the Indian Youth Centres Trust, which established the Vishwa Yuvak Kendra in 1968, a youth development organisation. Bajaj was among the founders of the Council for Fair Business Practices and the Advertising Standards Council of India (ASCI). On behalf of the family, he set up Jamnalal Bajaj Foundation, a charitable trust in which he was involved during his lifetime. Bajaj also held the position of president of the Indian Chambers of Commerce and Industry (FICCI), Indian Merchants' Chamber (IMC), and Maharashtra Chamber of Commerce (MCC).

=== Business ===
In 1952, Bajaj joined his family business as a director. He served as MD of Bajaj Electricals from 1970 to 1980. In 1991, he was appointed chairman of Bajaj Group and held the position till his death in 1994.

== Works ==
- Japan Ki Sair (1957)
- Atlantik Ke Us Paar
- Roosi Yuvakon Ke Beech (1962)
- Bapu - Smaran (1963)
- The Young Russia (1960)
- Vinoba Ke Patra (1962)
- Indian Economy: Emerging Perspectives (1986)

== Death ==
On 21 September 1994, at the age of 71, he died of cancer at a Bombay hospital. He was survived by his wife and two sons.

== Legacy ==
In 1996, the Indian Merchants' Chamber instituted the Ramkrishna Bajaj National Quality Award, which is an Indian equivalent of the Malcolm Baldrige National Quality Award (MBNQA). The award was named after Ramkrishna Bajaj. An Indian journalist, M. V. Kamath, has authored a biography on Bajaj, named Gandhi's Coolie: Life & Times of Ramkrishna Bajaj in 1995. Many education institutes named after Ramkrishna Bajaj, such as Ramkrishna Bajaj College Of Agriculture in Wardha and Ramakrishna Bajaj Sanskrit Bhavan in Mumbai.
