= Bajaj =

Bajaj may refer to:

== People ==
- Bajaj (surname), an Indian surname
  - Bajaj family, prominent Indian business family
- Bazaz, a related Kashmiri Pandit surname

== Companies and products ==
- Bajaj Group, a group of Indian firms in diverse businesses, founded by Jamnalal Bajaj of the Bajaj family
  - Bajaj Auto, a manufacturer of two- and three-wheelers in India, Indonesia, and South America, part of the Bajaj group
    - An auto rickshaw (three-wheeler), generically known as "Bajaj" after the Bajaj Auto company manufacturing such cars
    - Daihatsu Midget, a single-seat mini-truck also marketed under the name Bajaj
  - Bajaj Tempo, former name of a manufacturer of light trucks in India

== Other uses ==
- The Jamnalal Bajaj Institute of Management Studies, a Business school in Mumbai, India
- Shweta Bajaj, a fictional character portrayed by Ekta Kaul in the 2023 Indian film Pathaan
