= Lendbox =

P2P lending platform

Transactree Technologies Private Limited
- Company type: Private
- Industry: Financial services
- Founded: November 2015; 9 years ago in New Delhi, India
- Founder: Ekmeet Singh (CEO)
- Headquarters: New Delhi, Delhi, India
- Area served: India
- Key people: Bhuvan Rustagi (Co-founder); Jatin Malwal (Co-founder and CTO)
- Website: lendbox.in

Lendbox (officially known as Transactree Technologies Private Limited) is an Indian peer-to-peer lending and peer to peer investing non-bank financial institution founded in 2015 and based in New Delhi.

The company provides a platform for peer-to-peer lending allowing individuals to invest in loans and borrowers to obtain funding directly from individual investors.

== History ==
Lendbox was founded by Ekmeet Singh, Bhuvan Rustagi, and Jatin Malwal in 2015. Lendbox raised Rs. 6 crore from its first investor, IvyCap Ventures in a pre-series financing round.

In 2018, Lendbox was listed among the top 10 P2P lending platforms in India by The Indian Wire.

In 2019, Lendbox received the NBFC-P2P certification from the Reserve Bank of India (RBI) allowing it to operate as a registered P2P lending platform.

Lendbox offered multiple P2P services both directly and through its partners (like Mobikwik Xtra). For fixed investments, they provided an annual interest rate of 13.99%. However, if withdrawals were made before maturity, the interest rate was reduced to 8% per annum. For flexible investments, Lendbox offered up to 12% interest per annum.

By the fiscal year 2025, Lendbox expects a revenue growth of 20% due to its expanding market presence.

== Partnerships ==
Lendbox partnered with several fintech platforms including EaseMyDeal, Cashe, TransUnion (formerly TrueCredit) and Mobikwik (for both Xtra and Zip).

== Controversies ==
=== System loopholes ===
Between December 2022 and March 2023, Lendbox faced a significant issue wherein approximately 457 scamster accounts exploited system loopholes. These accounts allegedly deposited cash into various P2P lending schemes and then withdrew the amount twice by making fraudulent refund requests—once through the Lendbox or Mobikwik app and a second time via the National Payments Corporation of India (NPCI), citing non-receipt of funds. This resulted in a loss amounting to approximately Rs. 10 crore.

Lendbox filed an FIR against the culprits to address the situation.

=== Unauthorized Loan Scam ===
Several people reported that Lendbox negatively impacted their CIBIL scores despite not having taken any loans from the platform. Lendbox clarified that these loans were issued by their partner, Mobikwik.

=== Operational Changes ===
Following guidelines issued by the RBI in March 2024, Lendbox ceased the 'Anytime Withdrawal' feature from September 2024 due to which existing funds were subsequently re-invested without explicit consent from users and approval for borrower's list.

Approximately Rs. 7000 crore was mapped as loan against user wishes in Mobikwik Xtra.

Company also shifted its focus to fixed-tenure products in order to comply with regulatory requirements.
