= Bajaj Finance =

Indian financial services company

Bajaj Finance Limited
- Formerly: Bajaj Auto Finance Limited (1987–2025)
- Type: Public
- Traded as: BSE: 500034; NSE: BAJFINANCE; BSE SENSEX constituent NSE NIFTY 50 constituent
- ISIN: INE296A01024
- Industry: Financial services
- Founded: 25 March 1987; 39 years ago
- Founder: Rahul Bajaj
- Headquarters: Pune, India
- Key people: Sanjiv Bajaj; Rajeev Jain
- Products: Consumer finance; Commercial lending; SME finance; Personal loans; Business loans; Mortgage loans; Fixed deposits; Credit cards
- Revenue: ▲₹81,990 crore (US$8.5 billion) (2026)
- Operating income: ▲₹25,817 crore (US$2.7 billion) (2026)
- Net income: ▲₹19,017 crore (US$2.0 billion) (2026)
- Total assets: ▲₹559,952 crore (US$58 billion) (2026)
- Total equity: ▲₹116,986 crore (US$12 billion) (2026)
- Number of employees: 71,613 (2026)
- Parent: Bajaj Finserv (52.49%)
- Subsidiaries: Bajaj Financial Services; Bajaj Housing Finance; Bajaj Financial Securities
- Rating: CRISIL AAA+/Stable Long-term debt; ICRA AAA+/Stable Non-convertible debenture; CARE AAA+/Stable Non-convertible debenture
- Website: www.bajajfinance.com
- Footnotes; Financials as of 31 March 2024.

Bajaj Finance Limited (BFL) is an Indian deposit-taking non-banking financial company headquartered in Pune. It was formed as Bajaj Auto Finance Limited to finance Bajaj's two and three wheeler segments.

As per the 2023 list of NBFCs issued by the Reserve Bank of India, Bajaj Finance is in the "upper layer" based on scale-based regulation guidelines.

== History ==
Originally incorporated as Bajaj Auto Finance Limited on 25 March 1987 as a non-banking financial company, the company primarily focused on providing two and three-wheeler finance. After 11 years in the auto finance market, Bajaj Auto Finance launched its initial public issue of equity share and was listed on the Bombay Stock Exchange and National Stock Exchange of India. At the turn of the 20th century, the company ventured into the consumer durables finance sector and started offering small-size loans. In the subsequent years, Bajaj Auto Finance provided business and property loans as well.

In 2007, the company split its business of manufacturing and its financial operations. Bajaj Finserv was the result of this split.

In 2010, the company's registered name changed from Bajaj Auto Finance Limited to Bajaj Finance Limited. This change was made to depict wider scope of its operations in the financial industry. In its first seven years, Bajaj Finance mainly borrowed wholesale and lent retail. Since 2014, it has also borrowed retail and lent wholesale.

In January 2023, Bajaj Finance launched its loan against property (LAP) business for micro, small, and medium-sized enterprise (MSME) customers.

== Operations ==
As of March 2023, the company deals in consumer lending, SME (small and medium-sized enterprises) lending, commercial lending, rural lending, deposits, and wealth management. It has 294 consumer branches and 497 rural locations with over 33,000+ distribution points and 1,50,000+ stores. As of 30 September 2024, money markets made up 47% of company's borrowings, bank borrowings 29%, deposits 20%, and external commercial borrowings 4%. It had deposits worth ₹66,131 crore (US$6.9 billion).

Most of Bajaj Finance's revenue is generated from suppliers who pay for access to their customer base. As of December 2024, mortgages currently make up 31% of its consolidated AUM, while SME lending accounts for 14% and commercial lending for 13%.

Bajaj Finance previously worked with RBL Bank and DBS Bank to issue co-branded credit cards. In early December 2024, the company ended its partnerships due to new Reserve Bank of India rules restricting the role of non-banking partners in such agreements. However, in early 2025, the company re-entered the same space by partnering with Bharti Airtel to launch a co-branded insta EMI card.

== Subsidiaries ==
- Bajaj Housing Finance provides housing finance services, including home loans, loans against property, and lease rental discounting. In 2024, it went public with an initial public offering.
- Bajaj Financial Securities (d/b/a Bajaj Broking), the brokerage division, handles stock market equities trading.

== Funding and investments ==
The parent company, Bajaj Finserv, holds 52.49% of the total shares and has a controlling stake in the subsidiary.

=== Investments ===
In 2017–18, Bajaj Finance acquired a 12.6% stake in the mobile wallet company MobiKwik.

In November 2022, Bajaj Finance acquired a 40% stake in Mumbai-based SnapWork Technologies for ₹93 crore (US$9.7 million).

In October 2023, the company acquired a 26% stake in Hyderabad-based Pennant Technologies for ₹267.50 crore (US$28 million).

=== Climate finance ===
In November 2024, Bajaj Finance raised $400 million from International Finance Corporation to expand its climate finance operations in India.

== Regulatory ==
In September 2022, the RBI included Bajaj Finance as one of the 16 NBFCs that are part of the NBFC-Upper Layer list.

=== Compliance issues ===
In November 2023, RBI banned the company from approving or distributing loans through two of its lending services, namely 'eCOM' and 'Insta EMI Card'. In an exchange filing in May 2024, the company announced that the RBI had lifted the said restrictions following remedial actions taken by the company.

== Philanthropy ==
Bajaj Finance is involved in "Bajaj Beyond," a collaborative CSR initiative with Bajaj Auto and Bajaj Electricals, committing ₹5,000 crore (US$520 million) crore to multiple social impact projects. The company collaborates with various institutions including the Jamnalal Bajaj Foundation, Jankidevi Bajaj Gram Vikas Sanstha, and the Kamalnayan Bajaj Hospital. Also, it is involved in various areas such as education, empowering women, providing skill-building training, healthcare, and other projects focused on socio-economic development.

In August 2026, Bajaj Finance conducted finance literary programs in the rural parts of Odisha, India. This was part of the initiative 'Arthsutra Samvad'. The same is a programme spanning the nation, which is aimed at providing financial inclusion across villages. This programme also takes information to areas that are underbanked in the country. The same was focused on emphasizing on the need for financial discipline and create awareness against financial fraud. This was also meant to inform citizens about the responsible practices in financial management.
