= Rajiv Bajaj =

Indian businessman (born 1966)

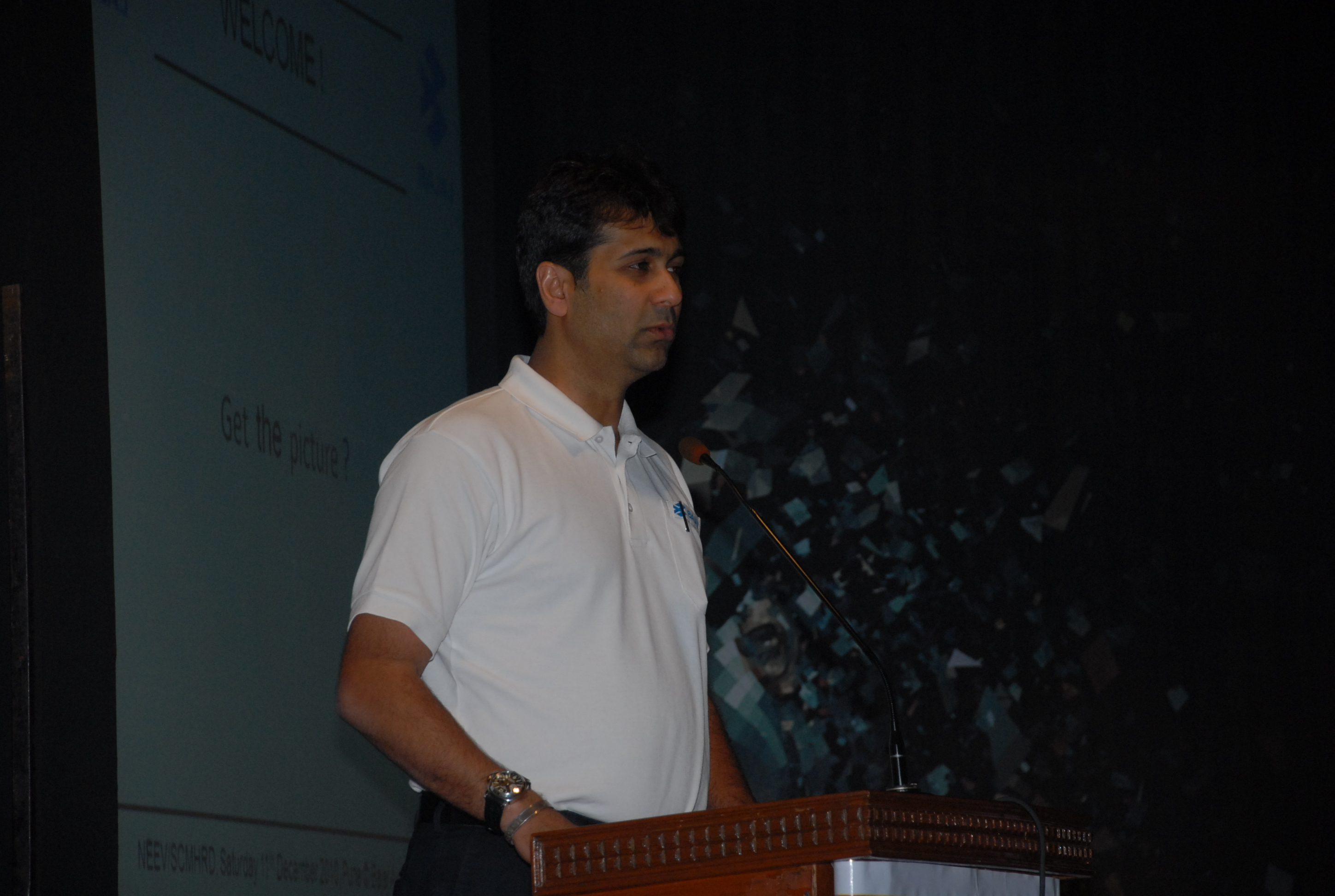
- Born: 21 December 1966 (age 59); Poona (now Pune), Maharashtra, India
- Education: College of Engineering, Pune; University of Warwick, England
- Occupation: Managing Director of Bajaj Group
- Spouse: Deepa Bajaj
- Children: 1

Rajiv Bajaj (born 21 December 1966) is an Indian businessman, and the managing director of Bajaj Auto since 2005. He introduced the Pulsar range of motorcycles credited with reviving the fortunes of the ailing company.

India Today magazine ranked him 42nd in their India's 50 Most powerful people of 2017 list.

== Early life and education ==
Rajiv Bajaj was born on 21 December 1966, to Rahul Bajaj. His younger brother Sanjiv Bajaj is also involved in the management of Bajaj companies. His younger sister, Sunaina Kejriwal, was the director of the Kamalnayan Bajaj Hall and Art Gallery, and died in October 2024, aged 53, after suffering from cancer for three years. Rajiv is the great-grandson of founder Jamnalal Bajaj.

Bajaj completed his schooling from St Ursula High School in Akurdi, Pune. He graduated with distinction in Mechanical Engineering from the University of Pune in 1988, and then completed his master's degree in Manufacturing Systems Engineering from the University of Warwick in 1990.

== Personal life ==
He is married to Deepa Bajaj and they have one child.

== Career ==
Bajaj worked at Bajaj Auto in the areas of Manufacturing & Supply Chain (1990–95), R&D and Engineering (1995–2000), and Marketing and Sales (2000–2005), and has been its managing director since April 2005.
