= Singapore FinTech Festival =

Financial technology conference

- Genre: FinTech
- Frequency: Annual
- Venue: Singapore Expo
- Location: Singapore
- Country: Singapore
- Inaugurated: 2016
- Founders: Monetary Authority of Singapore
- Participants: from 140 countries (2019)
- Attendance: 60,000 (2019)
- Website: www.fintechfestival.sg

Singapore FinTech Festival (SFF) is the largest FinTech festival in the world and a knowledge platform for the global FinTech community.

SFF is organized annually by the Monetary Authority of Singapore, Global Finance & Technology Network and Constellar in collaboration with The Association of Banks in Singapore.

== Background ==
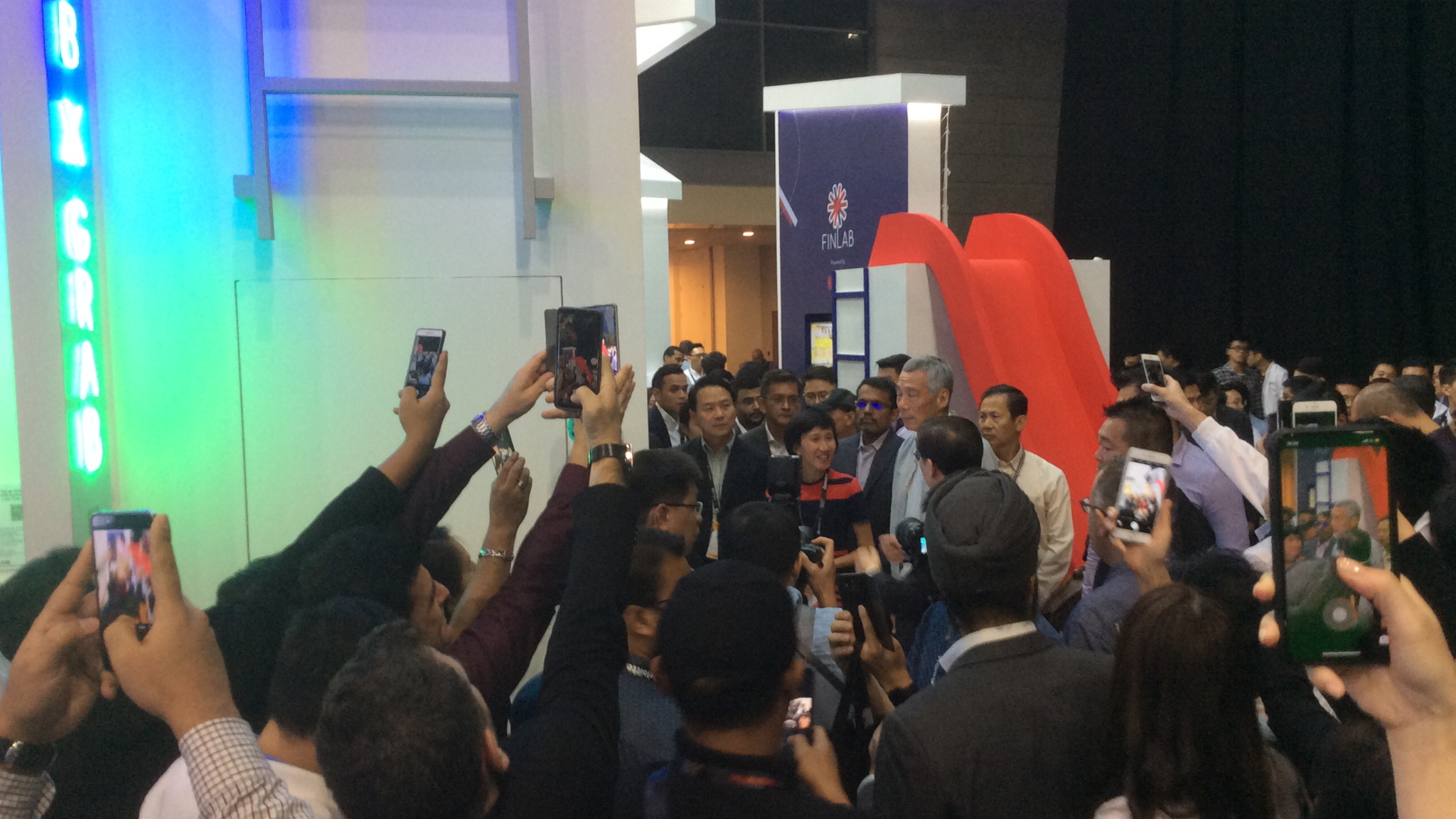
Lee Hsien Loong, Prime Minister of Singapore, visiting SFF exhibition pavilion with Ravi Menon, Managing Director, Monetary Authority of Singapore, in 2019

Initially, SFF 2016 started with a number of features including the FinTech Awards, the Global FinTech Hackcelerator, and three FinTech conferences which focused a number of topics such as API, Big Data, Blockchain, Machine Learning, RegTech and Tech Risk.

== History ==
There were more than 13,000 international participants from 60 countries in 2016. In 2017, more than 30,000 international participants from 109 countries attended the festival. Nearly 40% of the participants were C-suite, senior management level decision makers and influencers. In 2018, there were more than 45,000 international participants from 130 countries.

In 2019, the number of international participants increased to 60,000 from 140 countries.

Participants in 2019 include industry professionals, founders, investors, academics, and government agencies. The Conference and Exhibition featured 569 speakers and close to 1,000 exhibiting companies from around the world, including 41 international pavilions.

=== SWITCH ===
SFF and Singapore Week of Innovation and TeCHnology (SWITCH) had the collaboration first time in 2019 with a week long events and activities focusing FinTech and deep technology.

== Notable attendees ==
There were a number of international dignitaries participated including Christine Lagarde (in her role as the Managing Director of the International Monetary Fund), Justin Trudeau, Prime Minister of Canada, Narendra Modi, Prime Minister of India, Queen Máxima of the Netherlands (in her capacity as the Secretary-General of the United Nations’s Special Advocate for Inclusive Finance Development), Arun Jaitley, former Indian Finance Minister and Minister of Corporate Affairs, Dr. Agustin Carstens, General Manager of Bank for International Settlements (BIS), Dr. Patrick Njoroge, Governor of the Central Bank of Kenya, and Lee Hsien Loong, Former Prime Minister of Singapore.
