= MobiKwik =

Indian financial technology company

- Type: Public
- Traded as: NSE: MOBIKWIK; BSE: 544305
- Industry: Financial technology
- Founded: April 2009; 17 years ago
- Founders: Bipin Preet Singh; Upasana Taku
- Headquarters: Gurgaon, Haryana, India
- Area served: India
- Products: E-commerce payment system; Digital wallets
- Revenue: ▲₹875 crore (US$91 million) (FY24)
- Net income: ▲₹14 crore (US$1.5 million) (FY24)
- Owners: Bipin Preet Singh (20.21%); Upasana Taku (14.31%); Sequoia Capital India (17.25%); Bajaj Finance (13.86%); Net1 Applied Technologies (10.79%); Others (24.58%)
- Website: www.mobikwik.com

One MobiKwik Systems Limited, doing business as MobiKwik, is an Indian financial technology company, headquartered in Gurugram, Haryana. Founded in 2009 that provides a mobile phone-based payment system and digital wallet.

In 2013 the Reserve Bank of India authorized the company's use of the MobiKwik wallet, and in May 2016 the company began providing small loans to consumers as part of its service.

As of 2026, the company reported having 5 million merchants using its service and a user base of 193 million customers.The company employs over 325 people, operating in three segments including consumer payments, fintech, and payment gateway.

== History ==
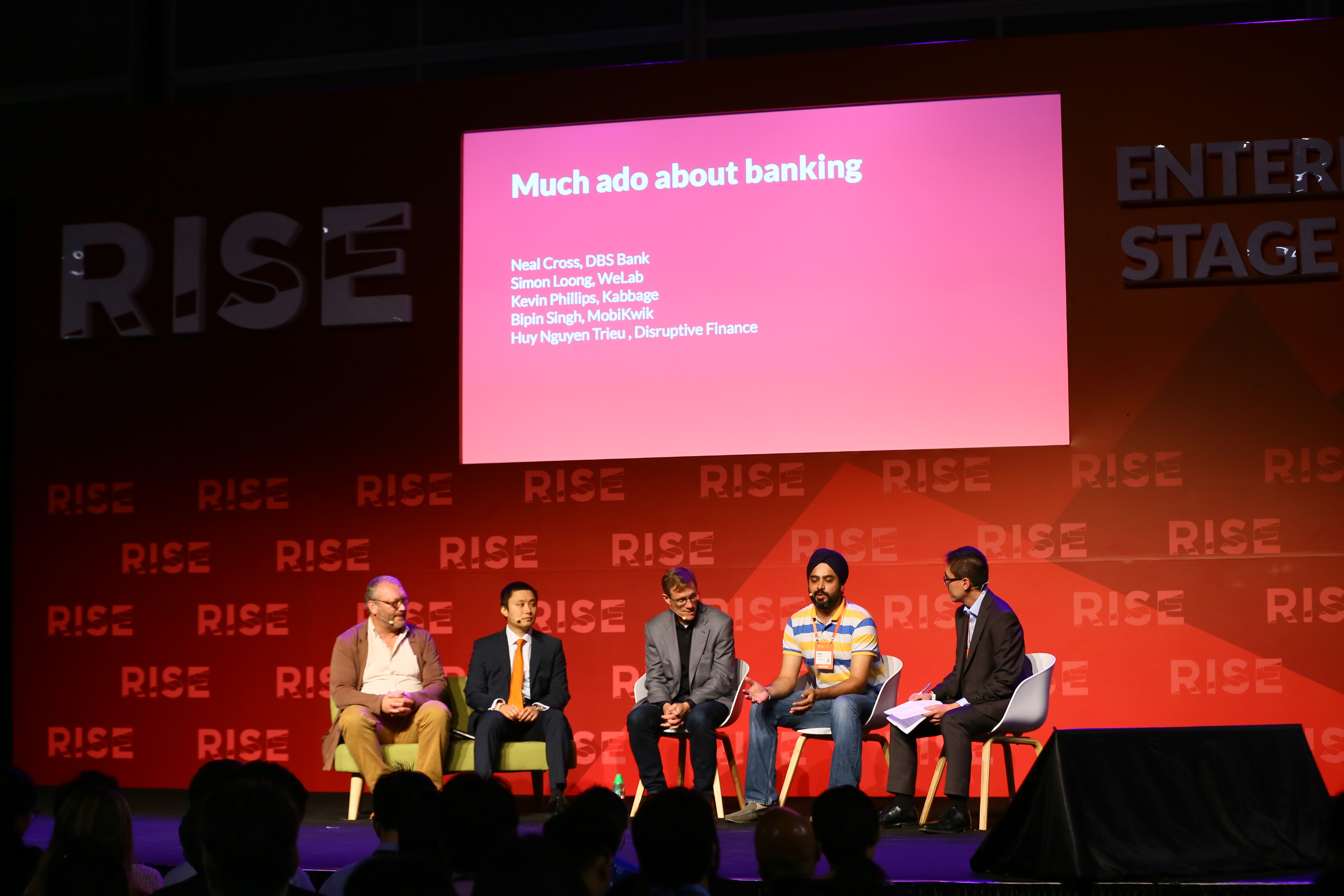
MobiKwik founder Bipin Singh (second from right) at the 2016 Rise Conference

MobiKwik was founded in 2009 by the husband and wife duo, Bipin Preet Singh and Upasana Taku. Singh, a 2002 graduate of IIT Delhi, seeded the company, developed the website and payment options, and rented office space in Dwarka, Delhi. The initial service was a website with a closed wallet facility, but over the years, MobiKwik extended their service to mobile apps. The company initially partnered with online merchants to make their wallet available as a payment option on e-commerce sites.

MobiKwik launched a digital wallet system in 2012 that enabled users to deposit money online to use for bill payments and other features. MobiKwik's semi-closed wallet was authorized by the Reserve Bank of India (RBI) in 2013. They also introduced the feature of sending and receiving money via a mobile app. In September 2014, Express Computer reported that MobiKwik was partnering with GoDaddy and other international companies to help them comply with Indian payment regulations. In April 2015, MobiKwik claimed to have 15 million users, according to Forbes India magazine.

In 2015, MobiKwik raised $25 million in Series B funding from Chinese investment firm Tree Line Asia, Sequoia Capital, Cisco Systems and American Express. In May 2016, the company announced a $50 million Series C round, led by GMO Internet and MediaTek, along with existing investors including Sequoia and Treeline Asia.

In a partnership with CashCare, MobiKwik began providing small loans between ₹500–₹2,500 to customers in May 2016. The company launched its MobiKwik Lite mobile app in November 2016, designed for users of older 2G mobile networks and for those in areas with poor internet connectivity. In the same month, MobiKwik had over 1.5 million merchants using its service and 55 million users. Following the 2016 Indian banknote demonetisation in November 2016, MobiKwik witnessed a 400% increase in financial transactions using the service by late December 2016.

In August 2017, Bajaj Finance picked up 10.83% stake in MobiKwik for ₹225 crore.

In 2019, MobiKwik announced a new partnership with DT One to expand their service internationally. In 2019, the company began offering loans, insurance and investment advice.

In May 2020, Mobikwik was briefly removed from the Google Play Store for violation of Google's advertisement policy.

On 25 February 2021, an Indian security researcher named Rajshekhar Rajaharia claimed that a hacker group called Jordandaven stole the KYC details of nearly 100 million MobiKwik users from a company server and put them up for sale on the dark web. On 4 March 2021, company denied the claim and said it would take legal action against the researcher. Later, multiple independent researchers and users confirmed that their Mobikwik data was available online, and on 30 March 2021, TechCrunch reported that company was hiring a third-party to conduct a forensic data security audit.

The Abu Dhabi Investment Authority purchased a 2.7% stake in MobiKwik for $20 million in June 2021. The Economic Times reported that MobiKwik had reached a valuation of $1 billion in October 2021, following a secondary employee stock ownership sale led by former Blackstone India chief Mathew Cyriac. The same year, MobiKwik filed for an initial public offering (IPO) to raise ₹1,900 crore (US$257.04 million), but later deferred its IPO plans.

In 2022, Mobikiwik suspended transactions from its e-wallet services to all major crypto exchanges in India.

In September 2024, MobiKwik received criticism after it suspended "anytime withdrawals" on its Xtra peer-to-peer lending platform. Investors complained that their money was being reinvested in new borrowers without their consent. MobiKwik stated that the withdrawal policy was changed by its P2P partner Lendbox and that users will not be able to withdraw their money as per previous terms.

In second week of December 2024, the company launched its initial public offering and raised ₹572 crore.

== Products and services ==
MobiKwik provides financial services including loan, accident insurance, life insurance, fire insurance, IMPS money transfer, credit card bill payment, mutual funds, and DTH recharge.

MobiKwik introduced a buy now, pay later (BNPL) and line of credit service named Zip partnering with Lendbox and Cashfree. Its peer-to-peer lending platform called Xtra was started in partnership with Lendbox.
