= Fintech awards =

- Awarded for: Financial technology
- Country: Africa; Australia; Canada; Europe; India; Italy; Luxembourg; Netherlands; Switzerland; United Kingdom; United States

FinTech Awards are several award ceremonies, most of them unrelated, which are held worldwide to recognize excellence in financial technology as assessed by either a public vote or panels of judges. There are typically many categories, winners and prizes. Hundreds of companies, including several fintech startups, participate as candidates.

Major fintech award ceremonies are held on an annual basis in India, Australia, Canada, Italy, United Kingdom, and United States. Other jurisdictions such as Luxembourg run these awards on a less regular basis. Some ceremonies are not national but continental, such as the Africa FinTech Summit, the Asia Fintech Awards and the European Fintech Awards.

== Awards by country and continent ==
=== Africa ===
The first African FinTech Awards and Conference was held at the Finance Indaba Africa conference and expo in Johannesburg on 13 - 14 October 2016. It gathered Africa's leading FinTech entrepreneurs, bankers, investors and advisors. In 2018, the Africa Fintech Summit was created, running regular award events. The 2024 event is being held in Nairobi, Kenya on 4 - 6 September 2024.

=== Asia ===
The Asia FinTech Awards are organised by FinTech Intel. These awards were developed to celebrate the burgeoning FinTech community throughout Asia, and the achievements and successes of those companies.

The Singapore FinTech Festival (SFF), the world's largest FinTech festival, has hosted the annual festival and awards ceremony annually, since 2016.

=== Australia ===
The 1st Annual Australian FinTech Awards was held on 23 June 2016. The awards were given in thirteen categories. The project, product, research paper, campaign, or activity that is entered must have been created, developed or released in the 18 months before the awards to be a valid entry.

Since 2016, the event has been held every year. The 9th edition happened in Sydney on 21 March 2024 and had fourteen categories.

=== Canada ===
The Canadian FinTech Awards were created in 2015 by the Digital Finance Institute, a prominent global think tank for financial technology created in 2013. The Canadian FinTech & AI Awards were first held in Toronto to celebrate Canadian innovation.

=== Dubai ===
A Dubai edition of FiNext Awards was run in 2018 by the InternetShine Corporation, a financial technology development company based in the US. The FiNext Conference Awards were first held in Las Vegas. The Dubai event received coverage by the online edition of the Entrepreneur magazine.

=== Finland ===
Helsinki Fintech Farm is the FinTech hub of Helsinki operated by HUB13. The hub is responsible for the award Best Finnish Fintech company of the year, which aims to recognise innovation and scalability in Finnish fintech companies. Enfuce Financial Services was the winner in 2018.

=== Europe ===
The Europe FinTech Awards are organised by FinTech Intel. These awards were developed to celebrate the burgeoning FinTech community throughout Europe and their achievements.

The European FinTech Awards is an organization that aims to disrupt traditional financial intuitions by providing a platform for fintech entrepreneurs to collaborate with one another. Like the Dutch and African awards, the European awards are the result of an initiative of Alex van Groningen BV, a Dutch financial publisher.

The awards start with the European FinTech 100, a selection of innovative companies with ground-breaking ideas and technologies. The wide batch is chosen by the vote of more than 55,000 fintech enthusiasts from all over Europe (as of 2016). Then a panel of fintech experts reduces the selection to one hundred companies. The one hundred, in turn, are the pool from which the finalists are chosen. The finalists have the opportunity to pitch during the conference.

The first European FinTech Awards & Conference was held in Amsterdam on 14 April 2016. 413 companies from 34 European countries were nominated. 30% of all nominees were from United Kingdom.

Behaviosec was the winner of the award for the Best European FinTech Company 2016. Winners in the 9 sub-categories were: Monese (Challenger Banks), Funding Circle (Alternative Finance), Ebury (Payments), Wikifolio (PFM), Everledger (Blockchain), Kreditech (Financial Inclusion), Knip (InsurTech), Backbase (Innovative Banking Software), and Behaviosec (Risk, Intelligence & Security).

=== India ===
Indian FinTech Awards is an event organized by the India FinTech Forum along with several startup accelerators. The winners are decided by a panel of industry stalwarts. The event focuses on actual working product demonstrations to encourage innovation and entrepreneurship.

=== Italy ===
The Italian Fintech Awards originated from the Grand Prix for Italian startups, held in 2014. The Grand Prix and the Fintech Awards were both organized by CheBanca!. The 2016 edition had a call for submission until 31 March, with 12 finalists being chosen among the candidates.

The winner was awarded 25,000 euros, personalized workshops with startup coaches, and a visit to a startup bootcamp in London. In 2016, the co-winners of the ceremony in Milan were Ovalmoney and eXrade.

As at 2024, the annual fintech award events in Italy are run by ItaliaFintech.

=== Luxembourg ===
The first Fintech Lion Awards, in Luxembourg, were held on 21 June 2016. Among the candidates, 15 start-ups from Luxembourg were chosen to pitch their projects at the semi-finals in May. Ten of them were chosen for the finals, which were held under the patronage of Prime Minister Xavier Bettel.

=== MENA ===
The FinTech Awards MENA are organised by FinTech Intel. The Awards were developed to recognise the achievements of fintech companies and individuals operating within the region. Categories include FinTech of the Year alongside categories focused on RegTech, Blockchain, InsurTech and Payments.

=== Netherlands ===
The first Dutch Fintech Awards took place at the headquarters of host ABN AMRO in Amsterdam in 2015. A 40-member jury gave awards in seven categories. The awards were attended by some 400 national and international fintech investors, companies, experts and executives.

In 2015, Adyen was the overall winner, receiving the award for a lasting breakthrough in the current payment industry. The winners in particular categories were: AcceptEmail (Payments), Five degrees (Banking IT), Bux (Personal Finance), Bitonic (Bitcoin), Sparkholder (Intelligence & Analytics), Symbid (SME).

=== Switzerland ===
The call for submissions for the first Swiss Fintech Award was published in October 2015. Any company founded by a Swiss citizen or headquartered in Switzerland could participate. A jury of 16 experts chose the top ten enterprises that would be trained in boot camps. The second round was a speed dating event with the jury and award sponsors in early February 2016. The three finalists pitched their ideas at the financial and economic forum Fintech 2016 on 31 March 2016. The winner won a cash prize and a stay at the Accenture Fintech Innovation Lab in London.

=== United Kingdom ===
The UK FinTech Awards are organised by the platform FinTech Intel and were developed to celebrate the UK's burgeoning FinTech community and their achievements. The categories are designed to cover the full spectrum of fintech, and submissions are judged by an independent panel of experts. The awards culminate in a black-tie ceremony and dinner, held in London. The 2024 winners included Wise and Aviva.

The first AltFi Awards ceremony was held in 2014. The awards recognised achievements across the global financial technology industry and had Zopa, Monzo and Funding Circle amongst its winners. There were annual AltFi Awards until 2023, when the company had to close alleging “severe headwinds.”

Another notable fintech awards in the UK are the FinanceFeeds Awards, which had their inaugural edition in 2023 and had CMC Markets and TradingView amongst the winners.

=== United States ===
The US FinTech Awards are organised by FinTech Intel. These awards were developed to celebrate the US fintech community and their achievements. The categories are designed to cover the full spectrum of fintech, and submissions are judged by an independent panel of experts. The awards culminate in a black-tie ceremony and dinner, held in New York City.

The Efma Fintech Awards highlight the best in class fintech solutions in several categories, with a panel of experts voting on the best solutions. In 2016, the winners were announced at Efma's Distribution Summit on 14 April 2016.

== See also ==
- List of business and industry awards
