= Rahul Bajaj =

Indian businessman and politician (1938–2022)

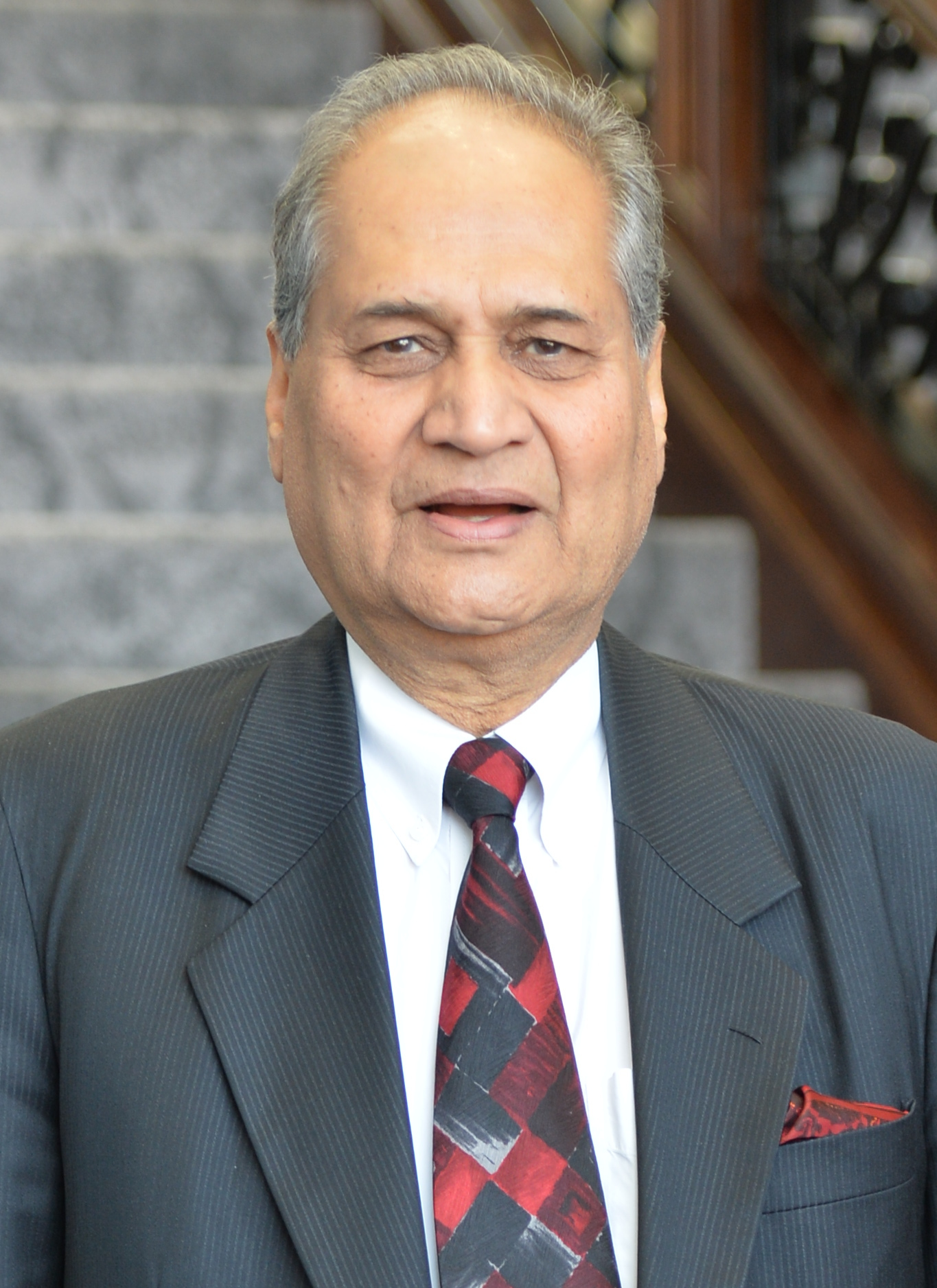
- Bajaj in 2014
- Born: 10 June 1938; Calcutta, Bengal Presidency, British India
- Died: 12 February 2022 (aged 83); Pune, Maharashtra, India
- Education: St. Stephen's College, Delhi (BA) Government Law College, Mumbai (LLB); Harvard Business School (MBA)
- Occupations: Chairman emeritus, Bajaj Group
- Political party
- Spouse: Rupa Bajaj (m. 1961; died 2013)
- Children: Rajiv; Sanjiv; Sunaina
- Father: Kamalnayan Bajaj
- Relatives: Jamnalal Bajaj (grandfather); Janaki Devi Bajaj (grandmother); Tarang Jain (nephew)
- Awards: Padma Bhushan (2001)

Rahul Bajaj (10 June 1938 – 12 February 2022) was an Indian billionaire businessman and politician. He was the chairman emeritus of the Indian conglomerate Bajaj Group. He was awarded the third-highest civilian award in India, the Padma Bhushan, in 2001.

== Early life ==
Bajaj was born on 10 June 1938, to Kamalnayan Bajaj and Savitri Bajaj. He was the grandson of Indian independence fighter, Jamnalal Bajaj, who was a close associate of Mahatma Gandhi. Bajaj was an alumnus of Harvard Business School in the US, St. Stephen's College, Delhi, Government Law College, Mumbai and Cathedral and John Connon School.

== Career ==
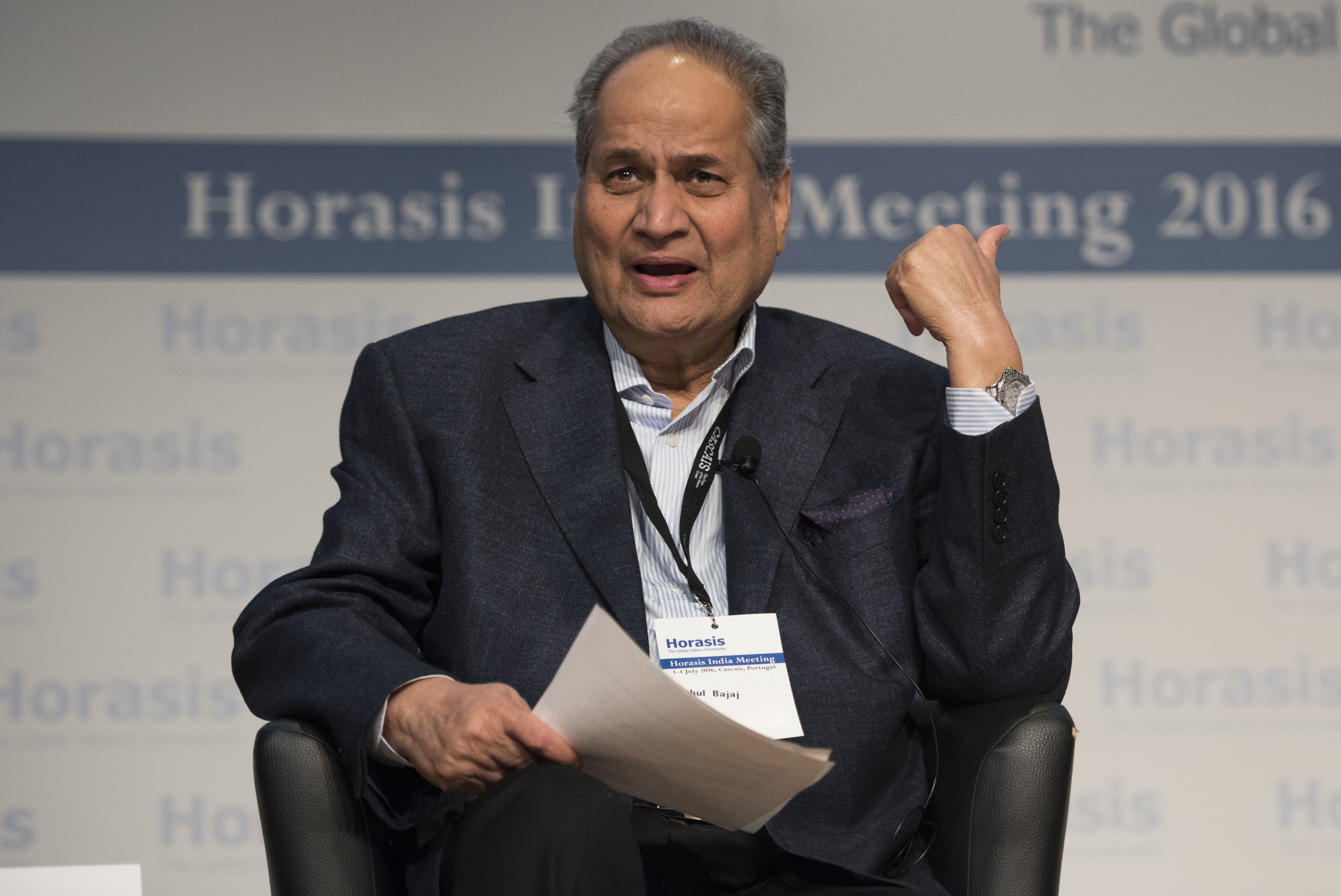
Bajaj speaking at the 2016 Horasis Global Meeting.

Bajaj took over the Bajaj Group in 1965. In a career spanning over five decades, he led the turnover of the group's flagship company, Bajaj Auto, from ₹7.5 crore to ₹12,000 crore, with the company's scooter Bajaj Chetak being the main growth driver.

Bajaj stepped down from his role in 2005 and his son Rajiv became the Group's managing director. Bajaj led the split of Bajaj Auto into three units in 2008: Bajaj Auto, Bajaj Finserv and a holding company. He resigned as chairman and non-executive director of Bajaj Finserv to become chairman emeritus in March 2019. In April 2021, Bajaj stepped down as non-executive chairman of Bajaj Auto, ceding the position to his cousin, Niraj Bajaj, and remained with the company as chairman emeritus.

Bajaj was elected to the Rajya Sabha, India's Upper House of Parliament, filling the seat vacated by the death of Pramod Mahajan for the 2006–2010 period.

Bajaj was elected as the president of the Confederation of Indian Industry (CII) twice, in 1979–1980 and 1999–2000. For his outstanding work to the Indian industry, the then President of India, Pranab Mukherjee, presented him with CII President's Award for Lifetime Achievement in 2017.

Some of the other positions that Bajaj held included chairman of Indian Airlines, chairman of the International Business Council at the World Economic Forum, chairman of the board at Indian Institute of Technology Bombay, member of the International Advisory Council at the Brookings Institution, and a member of the South Asia advisory board at Harvard Business School.

Bajaj received the Padma Bhushan, India's third-highest civilian honour, in 2001.

On the Forbes 2016 list of the world's billionaires, he was ranked No. 722, with a net worth of US$2.4 billion.

== Personal life and death ==
His sons Rajiv Bajaj and Sanjiv Bajaj are involved in the management of his companies. His daughter, Sunaina Kejriwal was the director of the Kamalnayan Bajaj Hall and Art Gallery, and died in October 2024, aged 53, after three years with cancer, and was married to Manish Kejriwal, the former head of Temasek India.

Bajaj died from pneumonia on 12 February 2022, at the age of 83. He was earlier admitted to the Ruby Hall Clinic in Pune, and was undergoing treatment at the hospital. He also had cancer and heart problems prior to his death.
