= Vikram Sunderam =

Indian-American chef (born 1967)

Vikram Sunderam (born 1967) is an Indian-American chef. He serves as the James Beard Award-winning chef at Rasika restaurant in Washington, DC and is co-author of a cookbook by the same name.

== Early life ==
Sunderam was educated in Mumbai, where he applied to several colleges, including to study engineering and medicine, but the culinary institute was the first to accept him so he enrolled. Next he began working for Taj Group of hotels, first for six years in Mumbai then 14 years in London.

He was executive chef for eight years at London's Bombay Brasserie.

== Restaurants ==
Working with Ashok Bajaj's Knightsbridge Group, Sunderam opened Rasika in December 2005, in downtown DC (Penn Quarter). Six years later, the team opened a second Rasika location in DC's West End neighborhood.

Sunderam won the James Beard Award for Best Chef: Mid-Atlantic in 2014 for his work at Rasika. The restaurant also receives widely favorable reviews and while President Barack Obama twice celebrated his birthday with dinner at Rasika.

In August 2016, Sunderam and the Knightsbridge Group opened a new restaurant in the Cleveland Park neighborhood of Washington called Bindaas, focused on Indian street food. In November 2017, a second Bindaas location opened in Foggy Bottom.

== Cookbook ==
On October 10, 2017, Sunderam published a cookbook called Rasika: Flavors of India with Ecco Press. The book is co-authored with Bajaj and DC-based chef and author David Hagedorn, and includes the recipe for palak chaat, Rasika's signature crispy spinach dish. The cookbook drew praise for rendering Sunderam's methods accessible to the home cook.
