= Ravi Menon (economist) =

Singaporean government official

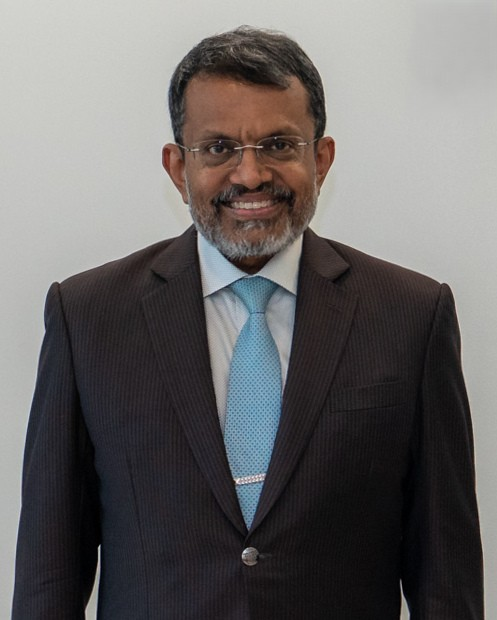
- Menon in 2025
- Occupation: Government official

Academic background
- Education: National University of Singapore; Harvard University

Ravi Menon is Singapore's Ambassador for Climate Action. He was a Singaporean government official who served as the managing director of the Monetary Authority of Singapore from 2011 to 2024.

== Early life and education ==
Menon was educated at Raffles Institution before graduating from the National University of Singapore in 1987 with a Bachelor of Social Sciences degree in economics.

In 1993, he went on to obtain a Master of Public Administration degree from the Harvard Kennedy School under a scholarship awarded by the Monetary Authority of Singapore (MAS).

== Career ==
Upon graduation from National University of Singapore, he began his career at the Monetary Authority of Singapore (MAS). He became assistant managing director of MAS in 2002, before being seconded to the Ministry of Finance in 2003 as its deputy secretary. He joined the civil service in 2005. In July 2007, he was appointed as the second permanent secretary of the Ministry of Trade and Industry (MTI). In October 2009, he became the permanent secretary of MTI. In 2011, he returned to MAS and was appointed as the managing director, taking over from Heng Swee Keat who stepped down to enter politics. During his management of MAS, he introduced new guidelines on the emergent fintech technologies. Menon retired on 1 January 2024 from his managing director position at the MAS, after having his appointment renewed for two years in May 2023.

Menon has held roles at the Bank for International Settlements and the Financial Stability Forum. Menon is on the Financial Stability Board steering committee.

From 2022 to 2024, Menon was the chair for the Network for Greening the Financial System (NGFS).

In 2024, Menon was named as the chairman of newly formed Global Finance & Technology Network by MAS. Also in the same year, he was appointed as Singapore’s first Ambassador for Climate Action and Senior Adviser to the National Climate Change Secretariat at the Prime Minister’s Office.

== Awards & accolades ==
- Meritorious Service Medal, 2017 - Singapore
- Best central bank governor in Asia-Pacific for 2018 - The Banker

== Personal life ==
Menon is married with three children.
