= Monetary Authority of Singapore =

Singapore's central bank and financial regulatory authority

Monetary Authority of Singapore Penguasa Kewangan Singapura 新加坡金融管理局 சிங்கப்பூர் நாணய ஆணையம்

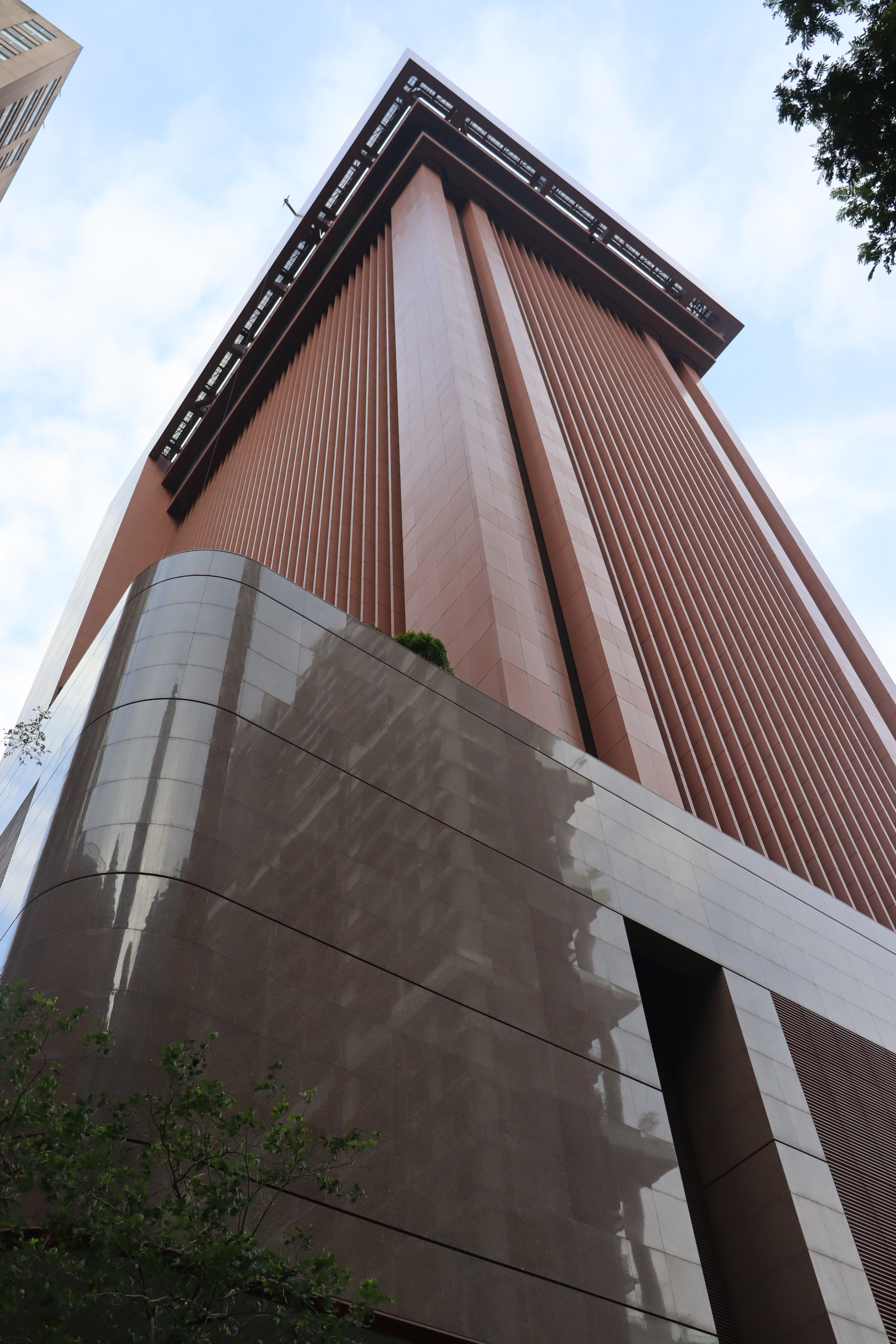
- MAS Building on Shenton Way, headquarters of the Monetary Authority of Singapore
- Central bank of: Singapore
- Headquarters: 10 Shenton Way, MAS Building, Singapore 079117
- Coordinates: 1°16′29″N 103°50′48″E
- Established: 1 January 1971; 55 years ago
- Ownership: Government of Singapore (overseen by the Prime Minister's Office)
- Key people: Gan Kim Yong (Chairman); Chia Der Jiun (Managing Director)
- Currency: Singapore dollar (S$); SGD (ISO 4217)
- Reserves: ▲US$428 billion
- Bank rate: 2.3176% (6 March 2025)
- Preceded by: Board of Commissioners of Currency, Singapore
- Website: www.mas.gov.sg

The Monetary Authority of Singapore (MAS), is the central bank and financial regulatory authority of Singapore. It administers the various statutes pertaining to money, banking, insurance, securities and the financial sector in general, as well as currency issuance and manages the foreign-exchange reserves. It was established in 1971 to act as the banker to and as a financial agent of the Government of Singapore. The body is duly accountable to the Parliament of Singapore through the Minister-in-charge, who is also the Incumbent Chairman of the central bank.

== History ==
The Monetary Authority of Singapore (MAS) was founded on 1 January 1971 with authority to regulate and supervise banking and finance in Singapore. It coexisted with the Board of Commissioners of Currency, Singapore established in 1967 to issue the city-state's currency, with which it eventually merged in 2002. Prior its establishment, its roles were performed by various government departments and agencies. The acronym MAS resembles mas, the word for 'gold' in Malay, Singapore's national language—although the acronym is pronounced with each of its initial letters.

During the COVID-19 pandemic, MAS brought forward its bi-annual meeting from some time in April to 30 March. The MAS decided to ease the Singapore dollar's appreciation rate to zero percent, as well as adjust the policy band downwards, the first such move since the 2008 financial crisis. This marks the first time the MAS had taken these two measures together.

Unlike many central banks around the world, the MAS is not independent from the Singapore Government—the MAS is under the purview of the Prime Minister's Office (PMO); chairmen of the MAS were either former or incumbent Minister for Finance. Some includes the former Prime Ministers or the current Deputy Prime Ministers.

== List of chairmen ==
No.	Portrait	Name	Term of office
1		Hon Sui Sen	January 1971 – July 1980
2		Goh Keng Swee	August 1980 – January 1985
3		Richard Hu	January 1985 – December 1997
4		Lee Hsien Loong	January 1998 – August 2004
5		Goh Chok Tong	20 August 2004 – 1 May 2011
6		Tharman Shanmugaratnam	1 May 2011 – 8 July 2023
7		Lawrence Wong	8 July 2023 – 15 May 2024
8		Gan Kim Yong	15 May 2024 – Incumbent

== Policy ==
Since 1981, monetary policy in Singapore is mainly conducted through the management of the exchange rate (rather than inflation targeting) of the Singapore dollar, in order to promote price stability as a basis for sustainable economic growth. The exchange rate is an intermediate target of monetary policy in the context of the small and open Singapore economy (where gross exports and imports of goods and services are more than 300 percent of GDP and almost 40 cents of every Singapore dollar spent domestically is on imports), the exchange rate represents a significantly stronger influence on inflation than the interest rate. As a result, the nominal exchange rate, directly and indirectly, affects a wide range of prices in the Singapore economy, such as import and export prices, wages and rentals, consumer prices and output prices.

MAS controls monetary policy through direct interventions in the foreign exchange markets and bears a stable and predictable relationship with the price stability as the final target of policy, over the medium-term. The Singapore dollar (SGD) is managed against a basket of currencies of Singapore's major trading partners and competitors; the various currencies are assigned weights in accordance with the importance of the country to Singapore's international trading relations (as shown below) and the composition of the basket is revised periodically to take into account any changes in trade patterns.

MAS operates a managed float regime for the Singapore dollar. The trade-weighted exchange rate, which is known as the 'Singapore dollar Nominal Effective Exchange Rate' (S$NEER) is allowed to fluctuate within a policy band; the level and direction of which is announced semi-annually (typically every six months) to the market. The policy band provides a mechanism to accommodate short-term fluctuations in the foreign exchange markets and allows flexibility in managing the exchange rate.

The exchange rate policy band is periodically reviewed by MAS to ensure that the policy band remains consistent with underlying fundamentals of the economy; the path of the exchange rate is continually assessed every 6 months in order to prevent a misalignment in the currency value. A Monetary Policy Statement (MPS) is released by MAS after each review, which provides information on the recent movements of the exchange rate and explaining the forward guidance of future exchange rate policy. MAS would also release an accompanying report, the Macroeconomic Review (MR), which provides detailed information on the assessment of macroeconomic developments and trends in the Singapore economy; the MR is aimed to enhance market and public understanding of the monetary policy stance.

As the MAS utilises the choice of the exchange rate as the intermediate target of monetary policy, this implies that MAS does not have any control over domestic interest rates (and money supply), due to the commonly accepted concept in international economics known as the policy trilemma. In the context of free capital movements, interest rates in Singapore are largely determined by foreign interest rates and investor expectations of the future movements in the Singapore dollar. Singapore domestic interest rates have typically been below U.S. Fed funds interest rates and reflect market expectations of a trend appreciation of the Singapore dollar over time.

The exchange rate has emerged as an effective anti-inflation tool for the Singapore economy. In the twenty years since the exchange rate framework was in place, domestic inflation was relatively low, averaging 1.9% per annum from 1981 to 2010. As a result of the long record of low inflation, expectations of price stability in Singapore have become more entrenched over the years. The exchange rate system has also functioned to mitigate the adverse effects of short-term volatility on the real economy, while at the same time ensuring that the exchange rate remains aligned with economic conditions and fundamentals. The success of the exchange rate system is heavily dependent on the economic fundamentals of Singapore, such as prudent fiscal policy, flexible product and factor markets, sound financial system, and robust domestic corporate sector.

=== Debt ===
Singapore's debts are under the responsibility of MAS. As of 2022, the Singapore Government debt exceeds the country's GDP at about 150%. However, these are not net debts, but gross external debts, which can be traced to the debt liabilities in Singapore's banking sector—a reflection of the country's stature as a major global financial hub. In essence, Singapore borrows to invest, not to spend. Therefore, unlike other countries, Singapore is a net creditor with no debt to anyone, and has a net debt-to-GDP ratio of 0%, maintained for almost three decades since 1995.

Accordingly, Singapore is the only country in Asia with a AAA sovereign credit rating from all major rating agencies. For multiple years, Singapore emerged as the top country in the world with the least-risky credit rating under the Euromoney Country Risk (ECR) rankings, being one of the safest investment destinations. The country was also ranked as the freest economy in the world on the Index of Economic Freedom rankings.

== Major trading partners of Singapore ==
Trade performance with major trading partners
Country / Region	Currency	ISO 4217 Code	Central Bank	Total Merchandise Trade Value with Singapore, 2021 (S$ bil)	% of Singapore Merchandise Trade Total	Total Services Trade Value with Singapore, 2020 (S$ bil)	% of Singapore Services Trade Total
China (Mainland)	Chinese yuan	CNY	People's Bank of China	164.3	14.16	40.0	7.99
Malaysia	Malaysian ringgit	MYR	Bank Negara Malaysia	128.7	11.09	11.4	2.29
United States of America	United States dollar	USD	Federal Reserve	105.7	9.12	101.8	20.35
European Union	Euro (only within Eurozone)	EUR	European Central Bank (only within Eurosystem)	102.0	8.80	67.2	13.43
Taiwan	New Taiwan dollar	TWD	Central Bank of the Republic of China (Taiwan)	99.0	8.61	10.7	2.14
Hong Kong	Hong Kong Dollar	HKD	Hong Kong Monetary Authority	85.1	7.34	28.7	5.74
Indonesia	Indonesian rupiah	IDR	Bank Indonesia	59.1	5.09	7.6	1.52
South Korea	South Korean won	KRW	Bank of Korea	56.2	4.85	9.7	1.93
Japan	Japanese yen	JPY	Bank of Japan	53.9	4.65	43.8	8.76
Thailand	Thai baht	THB	Bank of Thailand	34.1	2.94	8.1	1.61
Australia	Australian dollar	AUD	Reserve Bank of Australia	27.2	2.35	31.1	6.21
Vietnam	Vietnamese đồng	VND	State Bank of Vietnam	26.9	2.32	6.6	1.33
India	Indian rupee	INR	Reserve Bank of India	26.8	2.31	14.7	2.92
Philippines	Philippine peso	PHP	Bangko Sentral ng Pilipinas	23.2	2.00	4.4	0.87
United Arab Emirates	United Arab Emirates dirham	AED	Central Bank of the United Arab Emirates	22.3	1.92	5.1	1.02
Switzerland	Swiss franc	CHF	Swiss National Bank	15.7	1.35	21.7	4.33
United Kingdom	Pound sterling	GBP	Bank of England	13.9	1.20	23.1	4.61
Saudi Arabia	Saudi riyal	SAR	Saudi Central Bank	9.6	0.82	1.2	0.24
Cambodia	Cambodian riel	KHR	National Bank of Cambodia	9.2	0.80	0.4	0.08
New Zealand	New Zealand dollar	NZD	Reserve Bank of New Zealand	3.9	0.34	3.6	0.72
Myanmar	Myanmar kyat	MMK	Central Bank of Myanmar	3.6	0.31	0.7	0.14
Canada	Canadian dollar	CAD	Bank of Canada	3.0	0.26	4.4	0.88

== Issuing banknotes and coins ==
Following its merger with the Board of Commissioners of Currency on 1 October 2002, the MAS assumed the function of currency issuance.

MAS has the exclusive right to issue banknotes and coins in Singapore. Their dimensions, designs and denominations are determined by the Monetary Policy Committee with Government approval. The banknotes and coins issued have the status of legal tender within the country for all transactions, both public and private, without limitation.

In December 2020, MAS approved digital bank licenses for 4 tech giants, Grab–Singtel consortium, Ant Group, Sea Group, and Greenland Financial consortium. Grab-Singtel and Sea Group were awarded digital full banking licenses, while Ant Group and Greenland Financial were awarded digital wholesale banking licenses. In May 2021, the ability to transfer money between Singapore's PayNow and Thailand's PromptPay was announced.

== Strategic initiatives ==
=== ASEAN Financial Innovation Network ===
ASEAN Financial Innovation Network (AFIN) is a non-profit organisation, established by the Monetary Authority of Singapore (MAS), ASEAN Bankers Association (ABA), and the International Finance Corporation (IFC), a member of the World Bank Group in 2018. AFIN launched the Application Programming Interface Exchange (APIX), a global fintech marketplace and regulatory sandbox in 2018.

=== Asian Institute of Digital Finance ===
The Asian Institute of Digital Finance (AIDF) is a research institute to enhance education, research and entrepreneurship in digital finance. AIDF is a collaboration between the Monetary Authority of Singapore, the National Research Foundation and the National University of Singapore (NUS) and was established in 2021.

=== Global Finance & Technology Network (GFTN) ===
The Global Finance & Technology Network (GFTN) is created by Monetary Authority of Singapore to serve expanding Singapore's fintech ecosystem globally. Ravi Menon, former managing director of the MAS is appointed as the chairman of GFTN.

The GFTN replaces and builds upon Elevandi, the non-profit organisation created by the Monetary Authority of Singapore in August 2021 to foster an active and open dialogue between the public and private sectors, to advance FinTech further in the global digital economy.

The GFTN will continue to operate as a not-for-profit, and will work with the MAS on industry and policy dialogues in the area of payments, asset tokenization, AI and quantum.

=== Project Nexus ===
The Bank for International Settlements signed an agreement with Central Bank of Malaysia, Bank of Thailand, Bangko Sentral ng Pilipinas, Monetary Authority of Singapore, and the Reserve Bank of India on 30 June 2024 as founding member of Project Nexus, a multilateral international initiative to enable retail cross-border payments. Bank Indonesia involved as a special observer. The platform, which is expected to go live by 2026, will interlink domestic fast payment systems of the member countries.

=== Singapore FinTech Festival ===
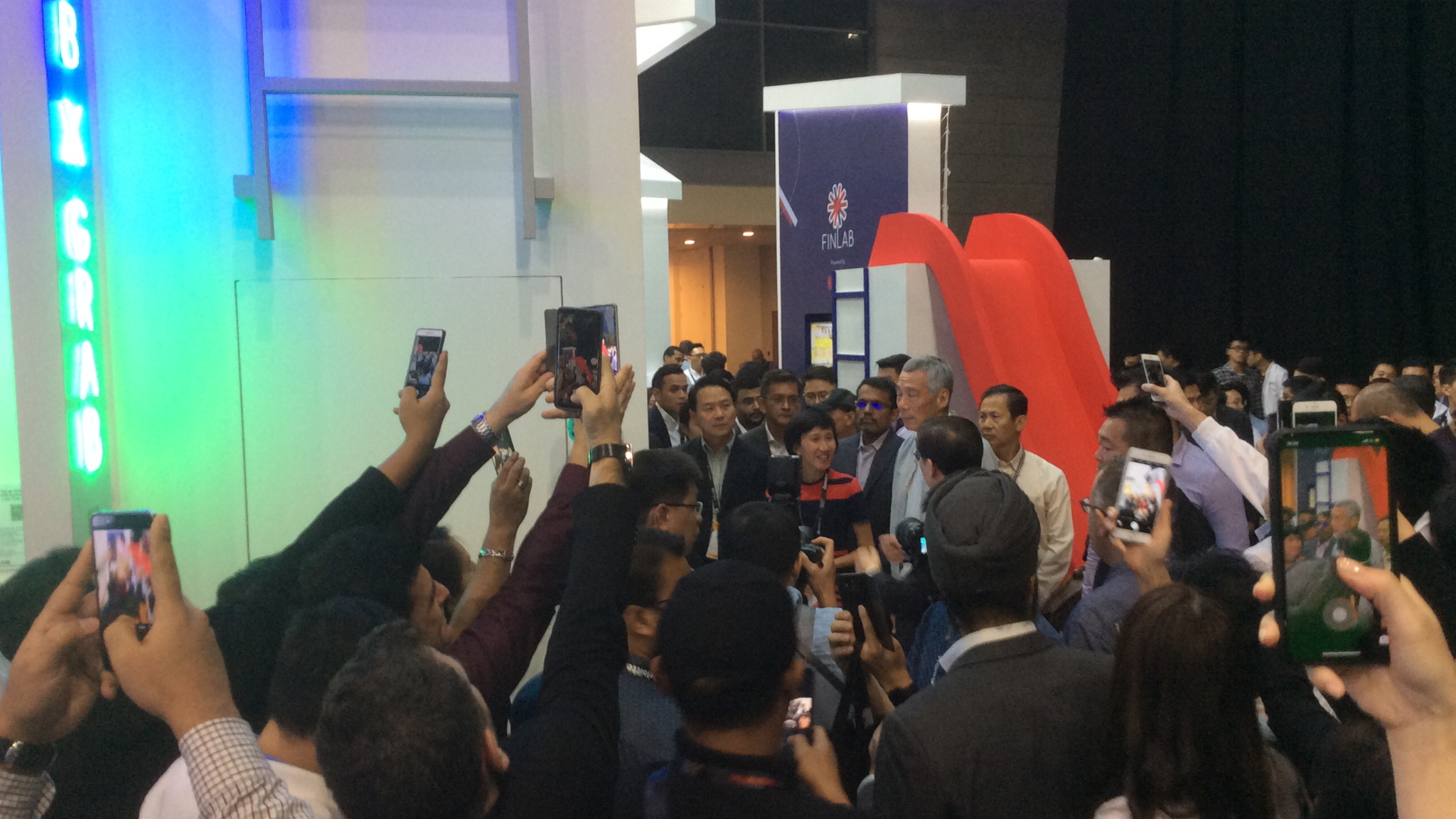
Lee Hsien Loong, Prime Minister of Singapore visiting Singapore FinTech Festival exhibition pavilion with Ravi Menon, managing director, Monetary Authority of Singapore in 2019

The Singapore FinTech Festival (SFF) is annually organised by MAS, the Global Finance & Technology Network and Constellar, in partnership with The Association of Banks in Singapore, to connect the various FinTech communities around the world to one another.

=== Financial institution cybersecurity ===
On 18 September 2024, in a joint statement with the Association of Banks in Singapore (ABS), MAS announced that banks in Singapore will progressively require customers to use SingPass face verification to verify their identities when setting up their digital tokens, so as to better protect consumers from online scams.

=== Financing Asia's Transition Partnership ===
Financing Asia's Transition Partnership (FAST-P), was implemented by MAS as an initiative to unite both private-public partnerships in the sphere of de-carbonization and climate change resilience, first unveiled to the public at COP28. At the World Climate Action Summit, Singapore's Senior Minister and Coordinating Minister for National Security with backing from MAS first unveiled the project during opening remarks. Since then, in a demonstration of shared goals for the region, Australia's Prime Minister Albanese allocated the first of the nation's $2 billion SEAIFF (Southeast Asia Investment Financing Facility) investment toward the initiative in December 2024. Primary goals for FAST-P remain to promote the de-risking of perceived unstable green infrastructure ventures and to tangibly bolster previously marginally bankable projects for driving sustainable innovation, with a fund target of $5 billion USD.

Key partners in debt financing include Pentagreen Capital and its affiliates HSBC and Temasek, with additional endorsements by member entities' Statements of Intent and following memorandums of understanding. Member organizations range from the Asian Development Bank (ADB) and International Finance Corporation (IFC) to the Global Energy Alliance for People and Planet (GEAPP) target the sectors of renewable infrastructure in energy, electric vehicles, and water/waste management in a three-pronged approach to green investments, energy transition, and clean technologies.

== See also ==
- Open Finance
- Securities commission
- List of banks in Singapore
- List of central banks
- List of financial supervisory authorities by country
