= Peer-to-peer investing =

Investing practice

Peer-to-peer investing (P2PI) is the practice of investing money in notes issued by borrowers who are requesting a loan without going through a traditional financial intermediary and who are unknown to the investor. P2PI is not to be confused with Peer-to-peer lending (P2PL) which deals with the borrower's part. Investing takes place online via a peer-to-peer lending/investing company. There is an individual investor and an individual borrower. The notes can be sold as a security and so investors can exit the investment before the borrower repays the debt.

P2PI is a method of debt financing that enables individuals to lend money without using an official financial institution as an intermediary. While P2PI removes the middleman from the process, it also involves more time, effort, and risk than general brick-and-mortar lending scenarios.

== Characteristics ==
Peer-to-peer lending does not fit cleanly into any of the three traditional types of financial institutions—deposit takers, investors, insurers, and is sometimes categorized as an alternative financial service. The key characteristics of peer-to-peer lending are:

- It is conducted for profit.
- There is no necessary common bond or prior relationship between lenders and borrowers.
- Intermediation takes place by a peer-to-peer lending company.
- Transactions take place on-line.
- Lenders may choose which borrowers to invest in.
- The loans are unsecured and not protected by government insurance.
- Loans are securities that can be sold to other lenders.

Most peer-to-peer intermediaries provide the following services:

- On-line investment platform allowing borrowers to attract lenders
- Developing credit models for loan approvals and pricing
- Verifying borrower identity, bank account, employment, and income
- Performing borrower credit checks and filtering out the unqualified
- Processing payments from borrowers and forwarding those payments to the lenders
- Servicing loans
- Finding new lenders and borrowers (marketing)

== History ==
Early peer-to-peer lending was also characterized by disintermediation and reliance on social networks, but these features have started to disappear. While it is still true that the internet and e-commerce make it possible to do away with traditional financial intermediaries, the emergence of new intermediaries has proven to save time and expenses. Extending crowd sourcing to unfamiliar lenders and borrowers opens up new opportunities.

=== United States ===
P2PI is a new investment option and although it is accepted in many states, some state U.S. Securities And Exchange Commission (SECs) have not allowed for this type of lending.

== Legal regulation ==
In many countries, soliciting investments from the general public is considered illegal. Crowd sourcing arrangements where people are asked to contribute money in exchange for potential profits based on the work of others are considered to be securities.

Dealing with financial securities is connected to the problem involving ownership. In case of person-to-person loans, the problem of who owns the loans (notes) and how that ownership is transferred between the originator of the loan and the individual lender(s) is a problem. A question arises especially when a peer-to-peer lending company does not merely connect lenders and borrowers, but also borrows money from users and then lends it out again. This activity is interpreted as a sale of securities. Two things are required for this process to be legal, a broker-dealer license and the registration of the person-to-person investment contract. The license and registration can be obtained at a securities regulatory agency such as the SEC in the U.S., the Ontario Securities Commission in Ontario, Canada; the Autorité des marchés financiers in France and Quebec, Canada, or the Financial Services Authority in the United Kingdom.

The SEC regulates securities offered by the U.S. peer-to-peer lenders. A recent report by the U.S. Government Accountability Office (GAO) explored the potential for additional regulatory oversight by Consumer Financial Protection Bureau (CFPB) or the Federal Deposit Insurance Corporation (FDIC). However, neither organization has proposed direct oversight of peer-to-peer lending at this time.

In the U.K., the rise of multiple competing lending companies and problems with subprime loans have resulted in calls for additional legislative measures. These measures institute minimum capital standards and checks on risk controls to preclude lending to riskier borrowers, using unscrupulous lenders, or misleading consumers about lending terms.

== Advantages and criticism ==
=== Interest rates ===
One of the main advantages of person-to-person lending for borrowers has been obtaining better interest rates than traditional banks can offer (often below 10 percent. The advantages for lenders are higher returns than are available from a savings account or other investment. Interest rates and the methodology for calculating those rates varies among peer-to-peer lending platforms. The interest rates also have a lower volatility than other investment types.

=== Credit risk ===
Peer-to-peer lending also attracts borrowers who, because of their credit status or the lack of thereof, are unqualified for traditional bank loans. Since past behavior is frequently indicative of future performance and low credit scores correlate with high likelihood of default, peer-to-peer intermediaries have started to decline a large number of applicants and charge higher interest rates to riskier borrowers that are approved. Some broker companies are also instituting funds. Each borrower makes a contribution, from which lenders are recompensed if a borrower is unable to pay the loan back.

=== Government protection ===
Unlike depositing money in banks, peer-to-peer lenders can choose themselves whether to lend their money to safer borrowers with lower interest rates or to riskier borrowers with higher returns. Peer-to-peer lending is treated legally as investment and the repayment in case of borrower defaulting is not guaranteed by the federal government (U.S. Federal Deposit Insurance Corporation) the same way bank deposits are.

A class action lawsuit, Hellum v. Prosper Marketplace, Inc. is currently pending in Superior Court of California on behalf of all investors who purchased a note on the Prosper platform between January 1, 2006, and October 14, 2008. The Plaintiffs alleged that Prosper offered and sold unqualified and unregistered securities, in violation of California and federal securities laws, during that period. Plaintiffs further allege that Prosper acted as an unlicensed broker/dealer in California. The Plaintiffs were seeking rescission of the loan notes, rescissory damages, damages, and attorneys’ expenses. On July 19, 2013, the class action lawsuit was settled. Under the settlement terms, Prosper will pay $10 million to the class action members.

== See also ==
- Alternative financial services
- Peer-to-peer lending
- Comparison of crowdfunding services
- Customer to customer
- Non-bank financial institution
- Peer-to-peer banking
