= Asian Institute of Digital Finance =

Research institute in Singapore

- Abbreviation: AIDF
- Formation: 2021
- Type: Think Tank
- Headquarters: National University of Singapore; Innovation 4 (i4.0) Building, 3 Research Link, #04-03; Singapore 117602
- Location: Singapore
- Executive Director: Prof Huang Ke-Wei
- Website: AIDF

Asian Institute of Digital Finance (AIDF) is a research institute to enhance education, research and entrepreneurship in digital finance.

== History ==
AIDF is a collaboration between the Monetary Authority of Singapore, the National Research Foundation and the National University of Singapore (NUS) and was established in 2021.

== Initiatives ==
=== Applied Research ===
The institute also concentrates on applied research in green finance and deep credit analysis to facilitate digital infrastructure for B2B digital finance development in Singapore.

=== Business Incubation ===
The institute also facilitates business incubation to acquire innovative fintech ideas from research and classroom studies for a wider business world.
