= Ashok Bajaj =

Indian-American restaurateur

Ashok Bajaj is a restaurateur based in Washington, D.C. He is head of the Knightsbridge Restaurant Group.

== Biography ==
Bajaj was born in New Delhi. He left India in his early twenties, working in Sydney and in London, where he managed the Bombay Brasserie before moving the United States in 1988. He opened the Bombay Club, his first restaurant in Washington, in 1989 in his 20s, in initially working with an Australian partner, Norris Blanks, though the two parted ways after a year and a half. His restaurant group has since expanded and now includes Rasika, for which chef Vikram Sunderam won a 2014 James Beard Award. Sunderam and Bajaj met in London working together at the Bombay Brasserie. With Sunderam and chef and cookbook author David Hagedorn, Bajaj is co-author of the cookbook, Rasika: Flavors of India, published by the Ecco imprint of HarperCollins.

In addition to Rasika, which has two locations, Bajaj's restaurants include modern Italian restaurant Modena, modern American Annabelle, French bistro La Bis, Levantine-style Sababa and its wine bar neighbor Little Black Bird, and his third Indian concept, Bindaas. Former Bashok restaurants include Bibiana, Nopa Kitchen + Bar, 701, The Oval Room and Ardeo + Bardeo. He opened the latter in 2016 with chef Sunderam.

A 2013 profile in The New York Times headlined "Right This Way, Senator: A New Delhi-Born Restaurateur Brings Power Dining to D.C." describes Bajaj as "arguably the most successful restaurateur in Washington." He was recognized as the 2013 Restaurateur of the Year by the Restaurant Association of Metropolitan Washington.

== Awards ==
- 2013 Restaurateur of the Year, Restaurant Association of Metropolitan Washington.
- 2017 Duke Zeibert Capital Achievement Award, Restaurant Association of Metropolitan Washington.
- 2022 finalist, James Beard Foundation Award for Outstanding Restaurateur
