= Bajaj Finserv =

Indian Financial Services Company

Bajaj Finserv Limited

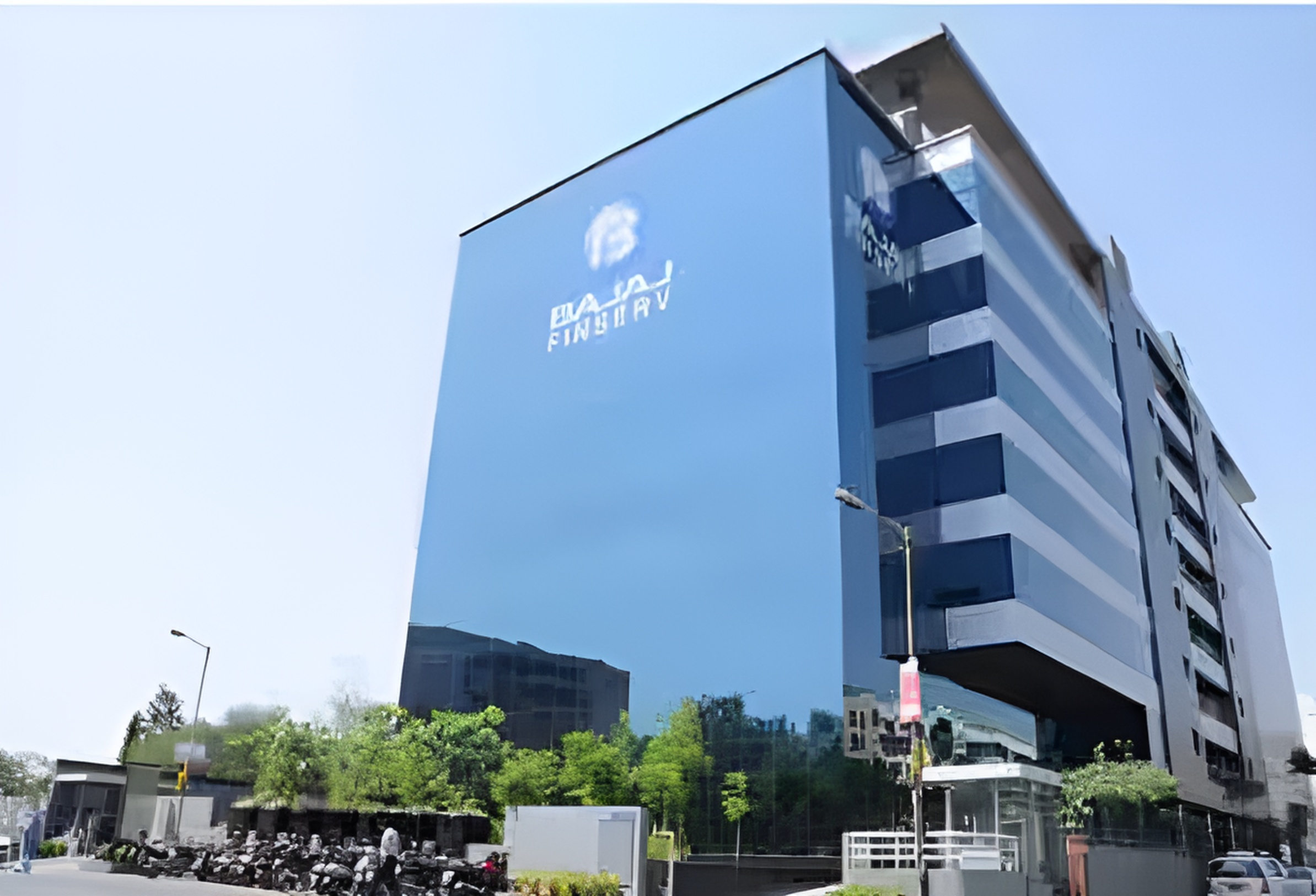
- Bajaj Finserv's headquarters in Pune
- Type: Public
- Traded as: BSE: 532978; NSE: BAJAJFINSV; NSE NIFTY 50 constituent
- ISIN: INE918I01026
- Industry: Financial services
- Founded: May 2007; 19 years ago
- Founder: Jamnalal Bajaj
- Headquarters: Pune, Maharashtra, India
- Key people: Sanjiv Bajaj (chairman & MD)
- Services: Asset management; Wealth management; Life insurance; General insurance; Mutual funds
- Revenue: ▲₹150,530 crore (US$16 billion) (2026)
- Operating income: ▲₹27,246 crore (US$2.8 billion) (2026)
- Net income: ▲₹9,801 crore (US$1.0 billion) (2026)
- Total assets: ▲₹699,881 crore (US$73 billion) (2026)
- Total equity: ▲₹69,192 crore (US$7.2 billion) (2026)
- Number of employees: 113,732 (2026)
- Parent: Bajaj Group
- Subsidiaries: Bajaj Finance; Bajaj General Insurance; Bajaj Life Insurance; Bajaj Finserv AMC; Bajaj Alts; Bajaj Finserv Direct (Bajaj Markets); Bajaj Finserv Health
- Website: www.bajajfinserv.in

Bajaj Finserv Limited is an Indian non-banking financial services company headquartered in Pune. It is focused on lending, asset management, wealth management and insurance.

== History ==
The financial services and wind energy businesses were transferred to Bajaj Finserv Limited (BFL) as part of the concluded demerger from Bajaj Auto Limited, approved by the High Court of Judicature at Bombay by its order dated 18 December 2007. It is a financial conglomerate with stakes in the financing sector (Bajaj Finance), the life insurance business (Bajaj Life Insurance), the general insurance business (Bajaj General Insurance), and the mutual fund business (Bajaj Finserv Mutual Funds).

Bajaj Holdings and Investments Limited (BHIL) came into existence when the original company separated its auto and finance assets. This new entity, BHIL is the parent company which holds 39.29% stake in Bajaj Finserv.

Apart from financial services, it is also active in wind energy generation with an installed capacity of 65.2 MW.

As of 1 July 2025, the Bajaj Group holds a 55% stake in the company.

== Subsidiaries ==
=== Bajaj Finance ===
Bajaj Finance was initially incepted as Bajaj Auto Finance in 1987 and later diversified into business and property financing.

==== Bajaj Housing Finance ====
Bajaj Housing Finance provides housing finance services, including home loans and loans against property. It is a subsidiary of Bajaj Finance.

=== Bajaj Life Insurance ===
Bajaj Life Insurance (formerly Bajaj Allianz Life Insurance) started as a joint venture between Bajaj Finserv and Allianz SE. The company received the Insurance Regulatory and Development Authority (IRDA) certificate of Registration on 3 August 2001 to conduct life insurance business in India. In 2025, Bajaj Finserv acquired Allianz SE's stake in Bajaj Life Insurance for ₹10,400 crore (equivalent to ₹110 billion or US$1.1 billion in 2026).

Bajaj Life Insurance was incorporated on 12 March 2001 under the Companies Act, 1956, after the liberalization of the insurance sector in India. It obtained a license from the Insurance Regulatory and Development Authority for carrying on the business of life insurance on 3 August 2001. It is a joint venture between Bajaj Finserv Ltd. owned by the Bajaj Group and Allianz SE, a German financial services company.

In July 2026, the company's assets under management crossed Rs. 1,43,744 crore.

In March 2025, Bajaj Finserv announced plans to acquire Allianz SE's 26% stake in the insurance joint ventures for approximately ₹24,180 crore, marking a significant shift in ownership.

In January 2026, Bajaj Finserv and its promoter group completed the acquisition of a 23% stake from Allianz, increasing their combined ownership to about 97% and effectively ending the 24-year joint venture. The Bajaj Group now owns 100% post the Allianz exit from the partnership. In June 2023, Bajaj Life opened its first representative office for servicing NRI Policyholders in Dubai. Till 2023 it expanded its operation to Dubai and the GCC region.

=== Bajaj General Insurance ===
Bajaj General Insurance (formerly Bajaj Allianz General Insurance) is a private general insurance company which began as a joint venture between Bajaj Finserv and Allianz SE in 2001. In 2025, Bajaj Finserv acquired Allianz SE's stake in Bajaj Allianz General Insurance for ₹13,780 crore (equivalent to ₹140 billion or US$1.5 billion in 2026). By January 2026, Allianz had fully exited the insurance business in India, increasing the group’s overall holding in both insurance arms to 97%. On 12 March 2026, Allianz fully exited via buyback of its remaining 3% stake.

=== Bajaj Finserv Asset Management Company ===
Bajaj Finserv Asset Management Company (Bajaj Finserv AMC) is an asset management company. In March 2023, the final registration from the Securities and Exchange Board of India was granted to commence mutual fund business operations under Bajaj Finserv Mutual Fund. It disclosed an average of ₹16,293 crore (US$1.7 billion) in average assets under management (AUM) for the quarter ending 30 September 2024, with 13 mutual funds.

=== Bajaj Finserv Direct ===
Bajaj Finserv Direct (Bajaj Markets) operates as an internet-based marketplace of financial products and services. It serves as a registered Corporate Agent under Insurance Regulatory and Development Authority, a registered Investment Adviser under Securities and Exchange Board of India, a registered third-party app provider for Unified Payments Interface payments, and a digital lending platform for its partner institutions.

=== Bajaj Finserv Health ===
Bajaj Finserv Health is a healthtech company. In early 2024, it acquired Bangalore-based outpatient delivery services company, Vidal Healthcare Services, and its two subsidiaries. As of December 2024, the company's network includes more than 100,000 hospitals and 80,000 doctors.

=== Bajaj Alternate Investment Management ===
Bajaj Alternate Investment Management (Bajaj Alts) is an early-stage equity fund and a real estate-focused alternative investment fund, started in September 2025.
