= Janaki Devi Bajaj =

Indian activist (1893 – 1979)

- Born: 7 January 1893; Jaora, Jaora State, India
- Died: 21 May 1979 (aged 86)
- Occupation: independence activist
- Spouse: Jamnalal Bajaj (m. 1902)
- Children: 5 (including Kamalnayan Bajaj)
- Awards: Padma Vibhushan (1956)

Janaki Devi Bajaj (7 January 1893 – 21 May 1979) was an Indian independence activist who was jailed for participating in Civil Disobedience Movement in 1932.

== Early life ==
Janaki was born on 7 January 1893 in Jaora in Jaora State into a Hindu family.

At the age of nine, she was married to 12-year-old Jamnalal Bajaj, a boy of her own community and similar family, in a match arranged by their families. The marriage was entirely harmonious and conventional, and Janaki Devi was a devoted wife and mother. At the time of their wedding, the Bajaj family was one of very average, middle-class tradespeople; over the years, Jamnalal would build a large business empire and become one of India's earliest industrialists.

== Career ==
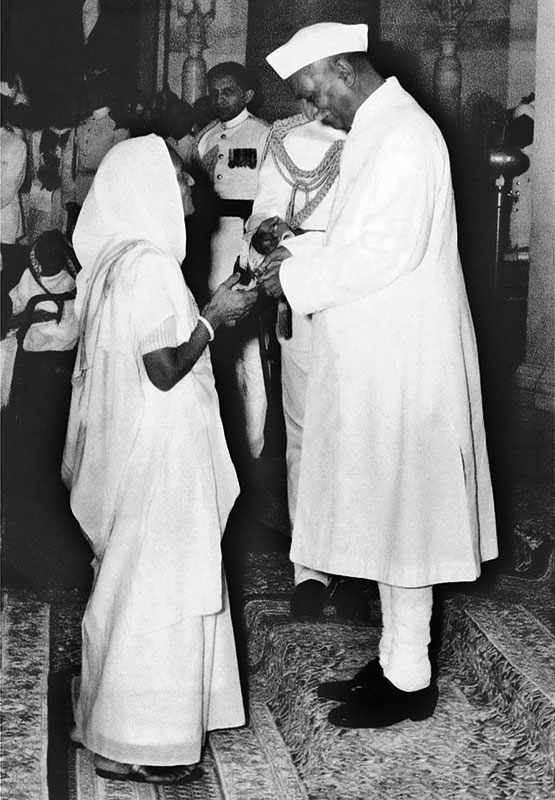
Janaki Devi Bajaj receives Padma Vibhushan from the President of India, Rajendra Prasad

Jamnalal participated in the freedom struggle movement, and Jankidevi also took up khadi spinning on charkha, working for Gauseva and the betterment of the lives of harijans and their temple entry in 1928. After independence, she worked with Vinoba Bhave on Bhoodan movement.

She served as President of Akhil Bhartiya Goseva Sangh for many years since 1942.

She published her autobiography titled, Meri Jivan Yatra in 1965.

== Death and legacy ==
She died in 1979. Many educational institutions and awards have been set up in her memory, including Janaki Devi Bajaj Institute of Management Studies, Janaki Devi Bajaj Government PG Girls College Kota and 'Jankidevi Bajaj Gram Vikas Sanstha' established by Bajaj Electricals. The Ladies' Wing of Indian Merchants' Chamber instituted the IMC-Ladies Wing Jankidevi Bajaj Puraskar for Rural Entrepreneurs in the year 1992–93.

== Awards and honours ==
She was conferred Padma Vibhushan the second highest civilian award in 1956.

== Works ==
- Bajaj, Janaki Devi. Meri Jivan Yatra (My Life Journey). New Delhi: Martand Upadhaya, 1965 (1956).

== Sources ==
- Shriman Narayan (1974). Jamnalal Bajaj: Gandhiji's 'fifth son'. Publications Division, Ministry of Information and Broadcasting, Govt. of India.
- Jankidevi Bajaj's Life – Gandhian Social Worker & True Disciple of Vinoba Bhave
- Jankidevi Bajaj – Ek Jivant Pratima https://www.jamnalalbajajfoundation.org/jankidevi-bajaj/books
