= Sanjiv Bajaj =

Indian businessman (born 1969)

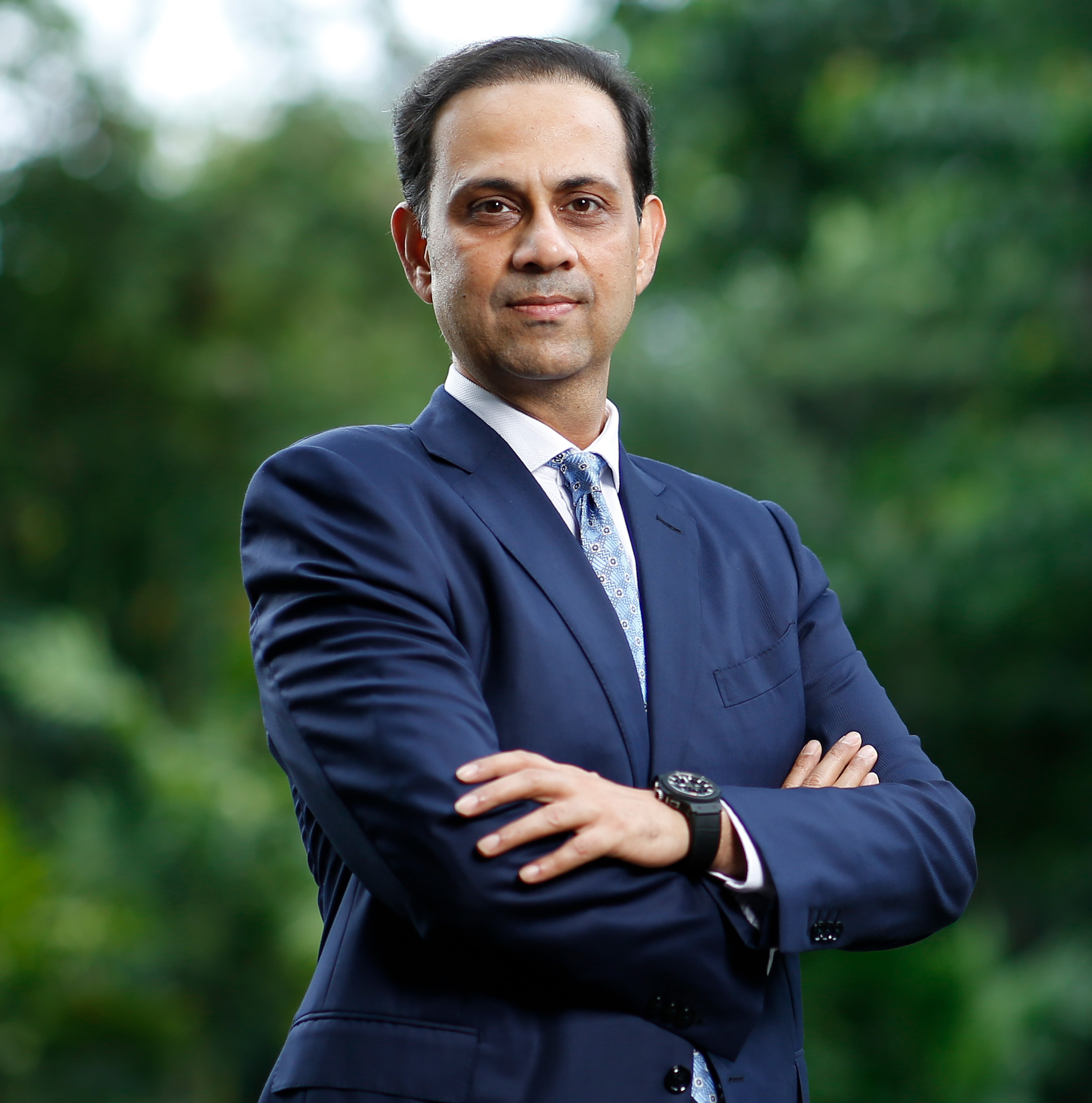
- Born: 2 November 1969 (age 56)
- Education: University of Pune, University of Warwick, Harvard University
- Occupations: Entrepreneur, Businessman
- Title: Chairman & MD, Bajaj Finserv
- Term: 2008–present
- Spouse: Shefali Bajaj
- Children: 2
- Parent(s): Rahul Bajaj, Ruparani Bajaj
- Relatives: See Bajaj Family

Sanjiv Bajaj (born 2 November 1969) is an Indian billionaire entrepreneur who currently serves as the chairman and managing director of Bajaj Finserv.

== Early life and education ==
Born into the Bajaj family, Sanjiv is the great-grandson of founder Jamnalal Bajaj and the younger son of Bajaj Group chairman Rahul Bajaj.

He completed his education at a Swiss missionaries-run Catholic convent school. He then pursued his mechanical engineering degree from the University of Pune, master's degree in manufacturing systems engineering from the University of Warwick, and his management degree from Harvard Business School.

== Career ==
Bajaj began his career in 1994 with Bajaj Auto. During his years at Bajaj Auto, he held various leadership roles in finance, legal, and international business functions within the organisation. He is credited with bringing American-style supply chain management to Bajaj Auto, using General Motors as a model. Currently, he serves as the non-executive director of Bajaj Auto.

After Bajaj Auto's demerger in 2007, Bajaj took charge as the managing director of Bajaj Finserv. Also, he took on additional roles like the chairman of Bajaj Allianz Life Insurance and Bajaj Allianz General Insurance, vice chairman of Bajaj Finance, and managing director of Bajaj Holdings & Investment Limited in 2012. Market analysts indicated in 2015 that Bajaj is shaping his company in a manner similar to GE Capital. In 2023, he oversaw the launch of Bajaj Finserv Mutual Fund.

Currently, he is the chairman and managing director of Bajaj Finserv. He was reappointed as managing director for five years in May 2022.

== Personal life ==
Sanjiv is married to Shefali Bajaj and they have two kids.

== Awards ==
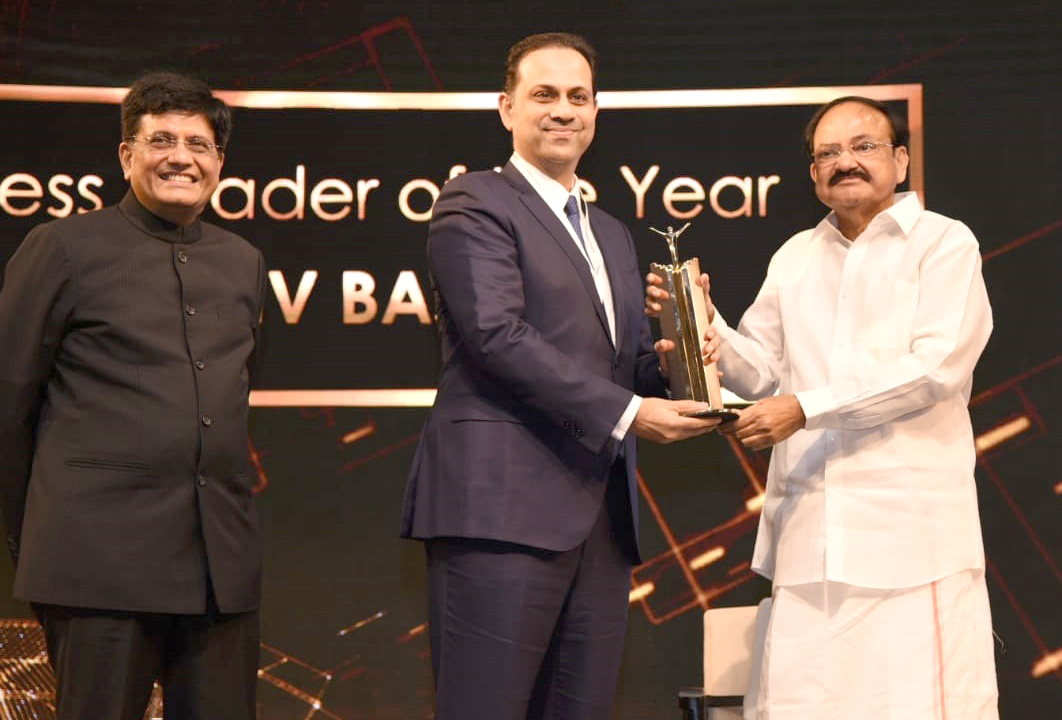
India's Vice President M. Venkaiah Naidu presenting the Business Leader of the Year Award to Bajaj at the Economic Times Awards 2018 for Corporate Excellence in Mumbai on November 17, 2018

- Ernst & Young Entrepreneur of the Year Award 2017.
- Economic Times Awards for Business Leader of the Year 2018.
- All India Management Association's Managing India Awards - Entrepreneur of the Year 2019.
- Financial Express: Banker of the Year 2019.

Preceded by T. V. Narendran	President of Confederation of Indian Industry; 2022—2023	Succeeded by R. Dinesh
