= Bajaj Group =

Indian conglomerate

- Type: Private
- Industry: Conglomerate
- Founded: 1926; 100 years ago
- Founder: Jamnalal Bajaj
- Headquarters: Mumbai, Maharashtra, India
- Area served: Worldwide
- Key people: Shekhar Bajaj; Madhur Bajaj; Niraj Bajaj; KK Bajaj; Rajiv Bajaj; Sanjiv Bajaj
- Products: Automobile; Financial services; Electrical; Iron & Steel; Insurance
- Owner: Bajaj family
- Number of employees: 1,00,000+
- Subsidiaries: Bajaj Holdings & Investment; Bajaj Auto; Bajaj Finserv; Bajaj Electricals; Mukand Limited; Bajaj Indef; Bajel Projects
- Website: bajajgroup.company

The Bajaj Group is an Indian multinational conglomerate founded by Jamnalal Bajaj in Mumbai in 1926. The group's official website claims to hold 40 companies with a market capitalization of Rs. 14 lakh crores (~US$ 167 billion). Its flagship automotive company, Bajaj Auto, is among the world's leading producers of two- and three-wheelers. The group operates across a range of industries, including automobiles, home appliances, heavy electricals, lighting, iron and steel, insurance, travel, and finance, among others.

The group was founded informally by Bachhraj Bajaj, with a cotton ginning factory in Wardha, Maharashtra, in 1905. Following his death in 1906, his adopted grandson—Jamnalal Bajaj, ran the business for two decades and then established it formally as an industrial and trading business in Mumbai in 1926, named Bachhraj Factories.

== Notable family members ==
=== Kamalnayan Bajaj (1915 – 1972) ===
Kamalnayan Bajaj, the elder son of Jamnalal Bajaj, returned to India after completing his education at the University of Cambridge, England, to assist his father in both business and social service. He played a key role in expanding the Bajaj Group by diversifying its operations into the manufacture of scooters, three-wheelers, cement, alloy castings, and electrical equipment. In 1954, He took over the active management of the Bajaj Group companies and led them towards significant growth and success.

=== Ramkrishna Bajaj (1924 – 1994) ===
In 1972, Ramkrishna Bajaj, the younger son of Jamnalal Bajaj, assumed leadership of the Bajaj Group after the death of his elder brother, Kamalnayan Bajaj. Alongside his business responsibilities, he dedicated much of his time and energy to social service and welfare initiatives. Ramkrishna Bajaj strongly believed in youth development and nation-building.

In 1961, he was elected Chairman of the World Assembly for Youth (India). He also served as the Managing Trustee of the Indian Youth Centres Trust, which established the Vishwa Yuvak Kendra in 1968 — a prominent youth development organization focused on leadership, education, and community service.

=== Rahul Bajaj (1938 – 2022) ===
Rahul Bajaj, the chairman emeritus and former managing director (until 2005) of the Group, was the grandson of Jamnalal Bajaj. He completed his schooling at the Cathedral and John Connon School, Mumbai; and then attended the St Stephen's College, Delhi; Government Law College, Mumbai; and Harvard University. He took over control of the Group in 1965 and led it to be one of India's largest conglomerates. In 2001, he was awarded Padma Bhushan, India's third-highest civilian award.

==== Other notable family members ====
Some of the other notable members of this family include:

- Rajiv Bajaj
- Sanjiv Bajaj
- Sunaina Kejriwal

== Group companies ==
- Bajaj Auto – Manufacturers of scooters, motorcycles, and three-wheeler vehicles and spare parts.
- Bajaj Electricals – Assemblers of electric fans, high masts, lattice closed towers, and poles.
- Bajaj Finserv – Financial Services.
- Bajaj Finance – Deals in financial services, including hire purchase, financing, and leasing.
- Bajaj Financial Services
- Bajaj Housing Finance
- Bajaj Allianz General Insurance – General insurance business.
- Bajaj Life Insurance – Life insurance business.
- Bajaj Holdings & Investment Ltd. – Investment company focusing on new business opportunities..
- Bajaj Ventures Ltd. – involved in the manufacturing and trading of power tools and the manufacturing of housewares and parts.
- Hind Lamps Ltd. – Manufactures GLS, fluorescent, miniature lamps, and major components.
- Mukand. – Manufacturers of stainless, alloy, and special steels, including carbon and alloy steels.
