= Mukand =

Indian steel company

Mukand Limited
- Trade name: Mukand
- Formerly: Mukand Iron & Steel Works Limited (1937–1989)
- Type: Public
- Traded as: BSE: 500460 NSE: MUKANDLTD
- Industry: Steel
- Founded: 1929; 97 years ago in Lahore
- Founder: Seth Mukand Lal
- Headquarters: Mumbai, Maharashtra, India
- Key people: Mr Niraj Bajaj (chairman & MD)
- Revenue: ▼₹5,190 crore (US$540 million) (2024)
- Net income: ▼₹102 crore (US$11 million) (2024)
- Number of employees: 1,551 (including 881 workers) (2024)
- Parent: Bajaj Group
- Website: Official Website

Mukand Limited (formerly Mukand Iron & Steel Works Limited) is an India-based manufacturer of stainless steel, alloy steel, and stainless steel billets, and is an exporter of hot rolled bars. Part of the Bajaj Group, the company also produces steel castings, structurals, cranes, and other industrial machinery. Founded in 1937, Mukand is recognized for producing some of India's largest industrial cranes, including an 80-tonne, 60-metre-span gantry crane.

== History ==
Mukand was established in 1929 in Lahore by Seth Mukand Lal. It was later acquired by Bajaj Group and moved to Mumbai in 1937. A steel plant at Kalwa, Thane commenced operations in 1965. It was renamed to Mukand Ltd from Mukand Iron & Steel Works Limited on 23 March 1989.

It also operates a steel plant in Ginigera of Hospet district in collaboration with Kalyani Steel known as Hospet Steel Ltd.
