= Kamalnayan Bajaj =

Indian businessman and politician (1915-1972)

Member of Parliament, Lok Sabha
- In office 1957–1971
- Preceded by: Shriman Narayan Agarwal
- Succeeded by: Jagjivanrao Kadam
- Constituency: Wardha

Personal details
- Born: 23 January 1915
- Died: 1 May 1972 (aged 57)
- Children: Rahul Bajaj
- Parent(s): Jamnalal Bajaj; Janaki Devi Bajaj

Kamalnayan Bajaj (23 January 1915 – 1 May 1972) was an Indian businessman and politician.

== Biography ==
=== Early life and education ===
Kamalnayan was the elder son of Jamnalal Bajaj and Janaki Devi Bajaj. He was born on 23 January 1915. He consolidated the Bajaj Group after inheriting it from his uncle in 1954. He completed his education from Cambridge University in England.

=== Business career ===
He diversified the interests of the Bajaj Group into the manufacture of scooters; three-wheelers; and cement, alloy casting and electrical equipment.

Kamalnayan Bajaj had three children, Rahul Bajaj, Suman Jain and Shishir Bajaj.

=== Political career ===
He was elected to Lok Sabha three times from Wardha (Lok Sabha constituency) from 1957 to 1971. He lost in 1971 after he had joined the Congress (O) in 1969 with his friend Morarji Desai.

=== Kamalnayan Bajaj Hall and Art Gallery ===
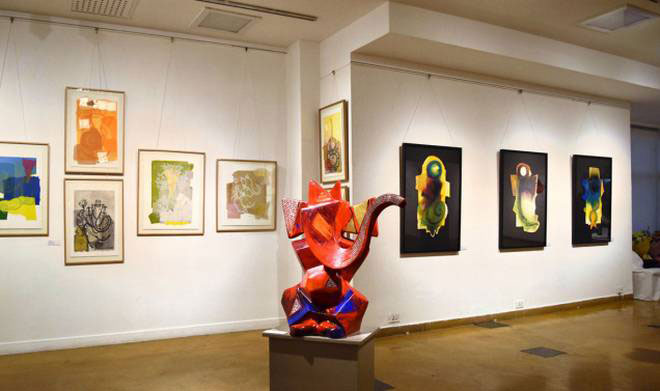
Inside the Kamalnayan Bajaj Hall and Art Gallery

The Kamalnayan Bajaj Hall and Art Gallery is an art gallery in Mumbai, India, named in honor of Kamalnayan Bajaj. The art gallery, established in 1980 at Nariman Point in Mumbai in memory of philanthropist and art promoter Kamalnayan Bajaj, the elder son of Jamnalal Bajaj. The gallery showcases both emerging and established artists' work, while the hall provides a venue for social, cultural, educational, and literary events for Mumbai art circle. Selected exhibitions held there include: * Spanda: Reverberations of the Cosmos, by Seema Lisa Pandya, January 2024.

- Ramkrishna Bajaj: A Century of Vision and Legacy, October 2023.
- Healing Through The Arts, March 2023.
- Kaliyug 3.0 by Manasa Kalyan, September 2023.
- The Future is Here, January 2019.
- Rhapsody Of Colours by Jigna Chaturvedi, April 2014.
- An Exhibition of Oil Paintings by Alka Bhandiwad, November 20-26, 2001.

== Death ==
He died at the age of 57 on 1 May 1972.
