= Jamnalal Bajaj =

Indian businessman and politician (1889–1942)

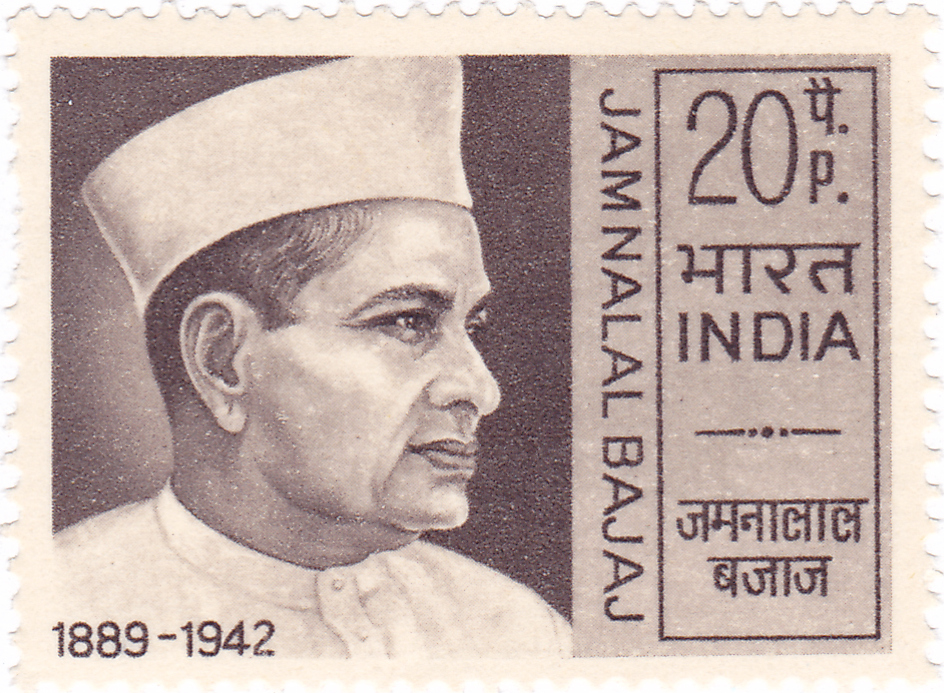
- Bajaj on a 1970 Stamp of India
- Born: Jamnalal Kaniram Bajaj; 4 November 1889; KashiKa Bas, Sikar, Rajputana Agency, India
- Died: 11 February 1942 (aged 52); Wardha, Central Provinces and Berar, India
- Occupations: Businessman; Politician
- Spouse: Janaki Devi Bajaj (m. 1902)
- Children: 5 (including Kamalnayan Bajaj)

Jamnalal Kaniram Bajaj (4 November 1889 – 11 February 1942) was an Indian businessman and politician. He founded the Bajaj Group of companies in the 1920s, and the group now has 24 companies, including six that are listed on the bourses. He was also a close and beloved associate of Mahatma Gandhi, who is known to have often declared that Jamnalal was his fifth son.

== Early life ==
Jamnalal Bajaj was born in 1889 into a poor family of farmers, to Kaniram and Birdibai, in a village named Kashi Ka Bas, near Sikar in Rajasthan state. In 1894, Seth Bachharaj Bajaj, a rich Marwari Agarwal businessman, and his family were going to Kashi Ka Bas village temple. They spotted young Jamnalal playing outside his home and were drawn to him. After much persuasion, Jamnalal was adopted as Seth Bajaj's grandson. In return, Bajaj installed a well in order to help the village.

Seth Bachharaj was a distant relative on his father's side and was a well-known and respected trader in the British Raj.

Upon coming of age, under the tutelage of Seth Bachharaj, Jamnalal got involved in the family business of his adoptive family. During this period, he acquired the skills of being a tradesman, rigorous bookkeeping and buying and selling commodities. He excelled in his work by the time Seth Bachharaj died. In 1926, Jamnalal founded what would become the Bajaj group of industries.

== Personal life ==
Jamnalal was married at age twelve to Janki Devi, who was around nine years old. Their son was businessman and politician Kamalnayan Bajaj.

== Honorary Magistrate ==
During the First World War, the British government appeased and honoured native tradesmen, soliciting funds. They appointed Jamnalal an honorary magistrate. When he provided money for the war fund, they conferred on him the title of Rai Bahadur, a title he later surrendered during the non-co-operation movement of 1921.

== Follower of Gandhi ==
Upon Mahatma Gandhi's return from South Africa, Jamnalal took in interest in Gandhi's way of life, his principles, such as Ahimsa (non-violence), and his dedication to the poor. He could understand Gandhi's vision that home-made goods were the answer to India's poverty. He considered that some British companies were importing cheap, raw cotton from India and sending back finished cloth. He was humbled by the simple life that Gandhi was leading at the Sabarmati Ashram. He was impressed by the Ashram's routine of prayer and physical work. He brought his wife Jankidevi and his children to live in the Ashram. However, this close relationship and his deep involvement in the independence movement did not leave Jamnalal Bajaj with much time to spend on his newly launched business venture.

== Freedom struggle ==
In 1920, Jamanalal was elected chairman of the reception committee for the Nagpur session of the Indian National Congress. He gave up the title of Rai Bahadur conferred on him by the British government and joined the non-co-operation movement in 1921. Later, in 1923, he participated in the flag satyagraha, defying a ban on flying the national flag in Nagpur, and was detained by British forces. This earned him national admiration.

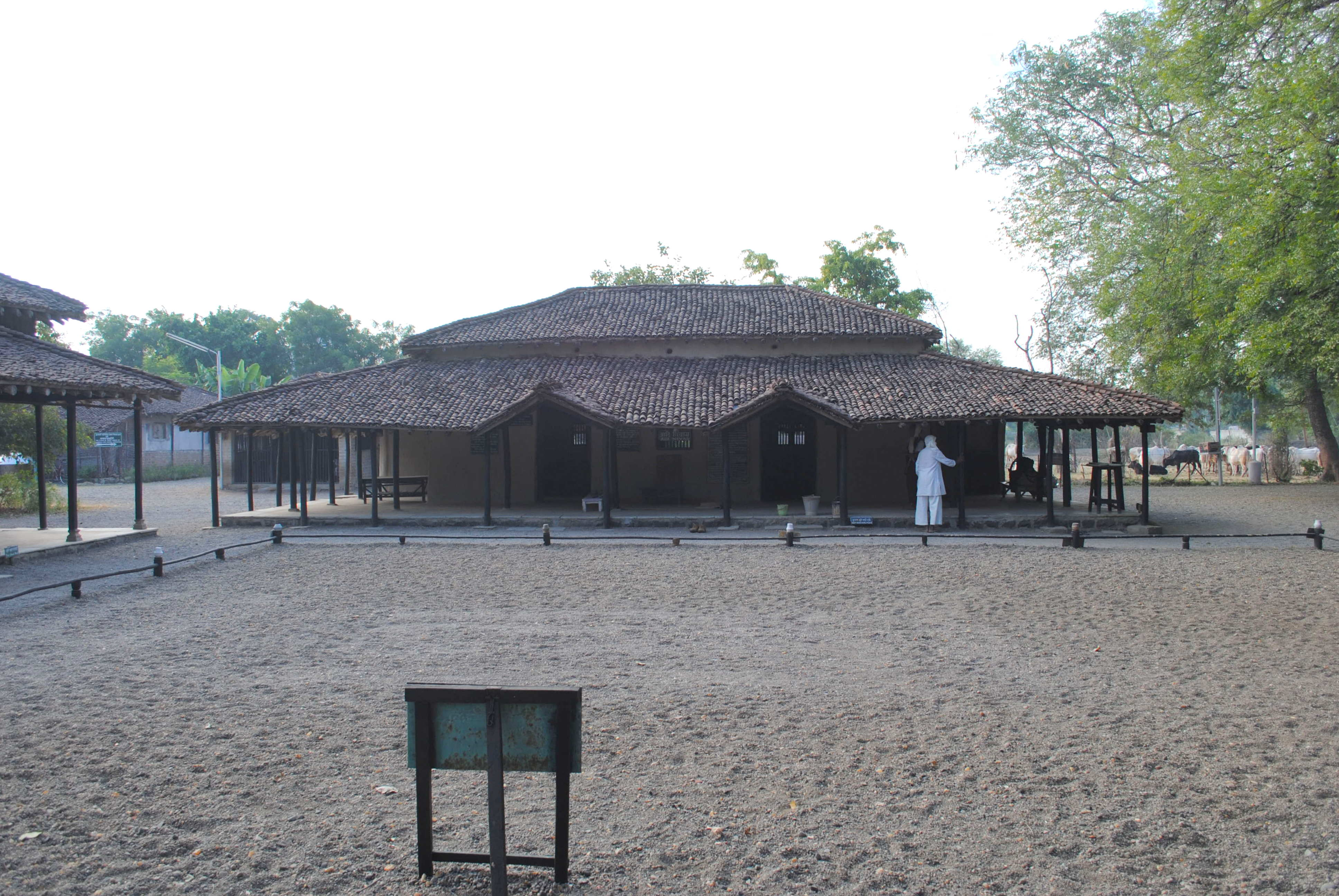
Sewagram at Wardha, Jamnalal Bajaj managed land for this ashram

He wanted Gandhi to move to Wardha and make it the center of his activities. After the Dandi March in April 1930, Gandhi moved to Sevagram, a small village near Wardha, since he wanted to live close to the rural populace. Gandhi vowed not to return to Sabarmati Ashram until freedom was achieved.

Jamanalal was named the president of Gandhi Seva Sangha, a group of workers who dedicated their time to constructive work. He was later elected a member of the Congress Working Committee and as the treasurer of Congress in 1933.

== Social initiatives ==
Jamanalal Bajaj was interested in initiatives such as the removal of untouchability, promotion of Hindi, and Khadi and village Industries. He had toured across the country promoting Khadi. In 1925, he was chosen as the treasurer of the All India Spinners Association. He was also the president of the All India Hindi Sahitya Sammelan (literary convention) that promoted Hindi as the single language to unite all Indians. He was instrumental in publishing Hindi magazines and books. He initiated the Gandhi Hindi Pustak Bhandar (bookshop) in Bombay and started the Sasta Sahitya Mandal (publishing house).

He founded the Dakshin Bharat Hindi Prachar Sabha along with C. Rajagopalachari in hopes of spreading the learning of Hindi across the country.

From 1927, he served as the first Treasurer of the Managing Committee of Jamia Millia Islamia, New Delhi. Later in 1928, he became a life member of the university, while still serving as the treasurer.

With the intent of eradicating untouchability, he fought the non-admission of Harijans into Hindu temples in his home town of Wardha. As orthodox Hindu priests and Brahmins objected, he opened his own family temple, the Laxmi Narayan Mandir, in Wardha, for the Harijans in 1928. He began a campaign by eating a meal with Harijans and opening public wells to them. He opened several wells in his fields and gardens.

Due to his devotion, he was elected the chief of the Jaipur Rajya Praja Mandal in 1938. While chief, he negotiated a truce between the Maharajas of Sikar and Jaipur.

In honour of his social initiatives the Jamnalal Bajaj Award has been instituted by the Bajaj Foundation. Past awardees include Nelson Mandela and Desmund Tutu.

== Business interests ==
Besides Bajaj Auto Ltd, the other major companies in the group include Mukand Ltd, Bajaj Electricals Ltd and Bajaj Hindusthan Ltd. His two sons, Kamalnayan Bajaj and Ramkrishna Bajaj, took his business forward. One of his grandsons, Rahul Bajaj, ran the family flagship company, Bajaj Auto.

== Legacy and memorials ==
Several institutions in India bear his name, including the Jamnalal Bajaj Institute of Management Studies. A locality, JB Nagar, in the sub-urban Andheri in Mumbai has been named after him. Jamnalal Bajaj Award was established in 1978 by the Jamnalal Bajaj Foundation and are given away each year on his birth anniversary.
