= Bajaj Electricals =

Indian electric appliances company pvt ltd

Bajaj Electricals Ltd.
- Type: Public
- Traded as: BSE: 500031; NSE: BAJAJELEC
- Industry: Electrical equipment
- Founded: 14 July 1938
- Founder: Kamalnayan Bajaj
- Headquarters: Mumbai, Maharashtra, India
- Key people: Shekhar Bajaj (executive chairman)
- Products: Home appliances, Fans, Lighting & Engineering and Products
- Revenue: ▼₹4,727 crore (US$490 million) (2024)
- Net income: ▼₹131 crore (US$14 million) (2024)
- Number of employees: 1,958 (2024)
- Parent: Bajaj Group
- Subsidiaries: Starlite Lighting
- Website: www.bajajelectricals.com

Bajaj Electricals Ltd. is an Indian consumer electrical equipment manufacturing company based in Mumbai, Maharashtra. It is a part of the ₹380 billion (US$3.9 billion) Bajaj Group. It has diversified with interests in lighting, luminaries, appliances, fans, LPG based generators, engineering and projects.

Its main domains are lighting, consumer durable, engineering and projects. Lighting includes lamps, tubes and luminaire. Consumer durable include appliances and fans. Engineering and projects include transmission line towers, telecommunications towers, high-mast, poles and special projects, and others include die casting, wind energy and solar energy. Some notable projects include lighting works at the Commonwealth Games stadium and the Bandra Worli Sea Link.

== History ==
Bajaj Electricals was incorporated on 14 July 1938 as Radio Lamp Works Limited under the Indian Company Act, 1913 as a Public company limited. On 1 October 1960 it was renamed Bajaj Electricals Limited. In 1964, Matchwell Electricals (India) Limited, ("Matchwell"), a manufacturer of electric fans became a subsidiary of the Company and subsequently, with effect from 1 July 1984, the business and undertaking of Matchwell was amalgamated with the company.

In the financial year 1993–1994, Bajaj Electricals entered into a joint venture with Black & Decker Corporation, US, for the manufacture and marketing of power tools, household appliances, and related accessories, through a separate company named Black & Decker Bajaj Private Limited, ("Black & Decker Bajaj").

During the financial year 1999-2000, Black & Decker Bajaj became a 100% subsidiary of the Company upon the Company acquiring a further 50% of the shareholding thereof from Black & Decker Corporation, after which Black & Decker Bajaj was renamed Bajaj Ventures Limited. However, in the financial year 2002–2003, the Company divested 50% of its shareholding in Bajaj Ventures Limited and Bajaj Ventures Limited ceased to be a subsidiary of the company. In January 1998, the company established a new manufacturing unit at Chakan near Pune and commenced operations of manufacturing of fans and die-cast components. The production of fans at the manufacturing activities of the Matchwell unit was also gradually shifted to the Chakan unit. In September 1999, Bajaj established and commissioned a wind energy generation unit with an installed capacity of 2.8 megawatts in the village of Vankusawade in Satara, Maharashtra. The facility continues to run profitably till date.

In the year 2000-2001 the Company set-up manufacturing facilities including a fabrication unit and a galvanising plant at Ranjangaon, near Pune for the manufacture of high masts, lattice towers, and related products, and the said manufacturing facilities commenced commercial production with effect from 1 April 2001.

In November 2002, the Company entered into a technical collaboration and brand licensing agreement with Morphy Richards, United Kingdom, for the sales and marketing of electrical appliances under the brand name of "Morphy Richards" in India.

In the year 2005 the company entered into a distribution agreement with Trilux Lenze of Germany for high end technical lighting.

In the year 2007, the company acquired 32% of the share capital of Starlite Lighting Limited, a company engaged in the manufacture of Compact Fluorescent Lamps ("CFLs").

In 2012–2013, they have completely divested the stake and association with Black & Decker Corporation, USA.
