= Fintech Association of Sri Lanka =

Organization of Sri Lanka

- Founded: 2018
- Type: Non-Governmental Organisation
- Purpose: Fintech
- Location: Colombo, Sri Lanka
- Region served: Sri Lanka and wider Asia(by collaborations)
- Key people: Rajkumar Kanagasingam, President; Suranga Mendis, Vice President; Rifas Raseek, General Secretary
- Website: www.srilankafintech.org

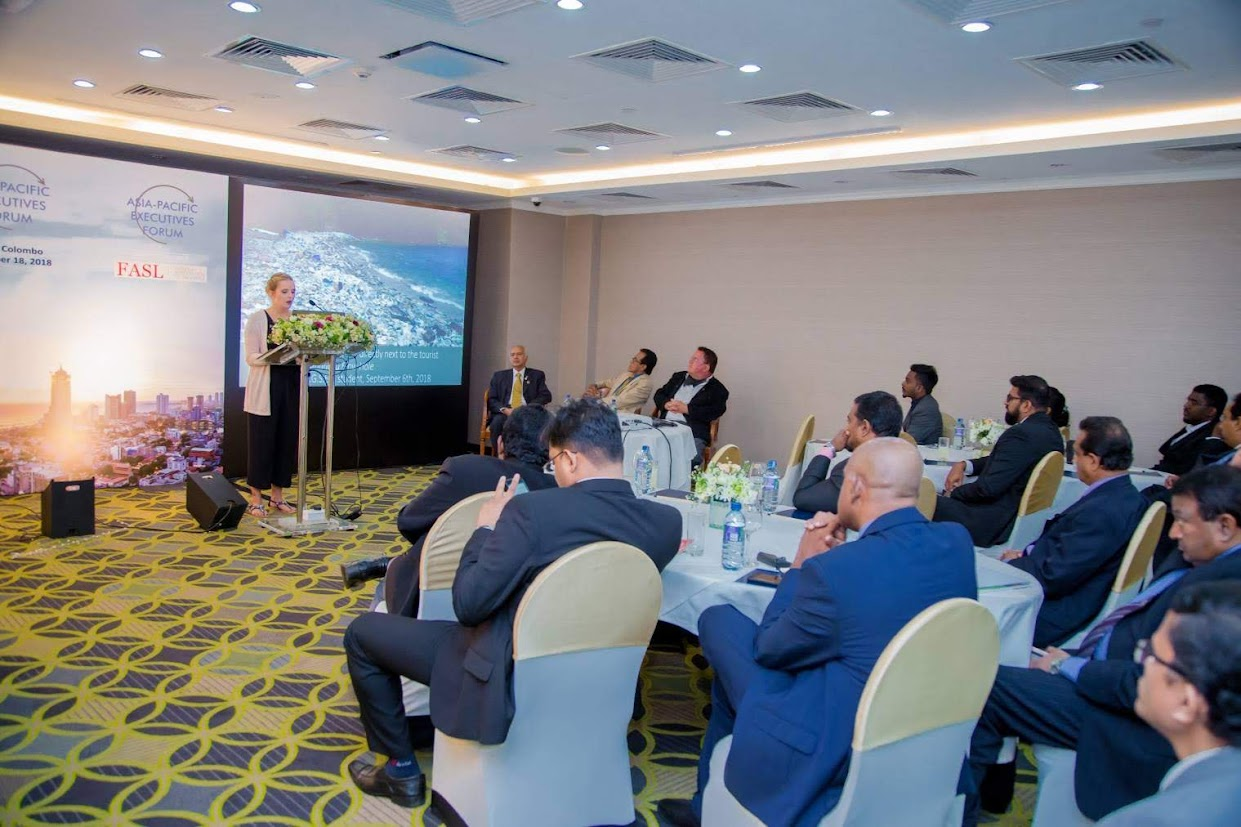
Fintech meetup of the Asia-Pacific Executives Forum held in collaboration with FASL at Hilton Colombo in November 2018.

The presidents of the Fintech Association of Sri Lanka and the Singapore FinTech Association exchanging a memorandum of understanding at Mandarin Oriental, Singapore in April 2019, witnessed by an assistant governor of the Central Bank of Sri Lanka and representatives of other organisations.

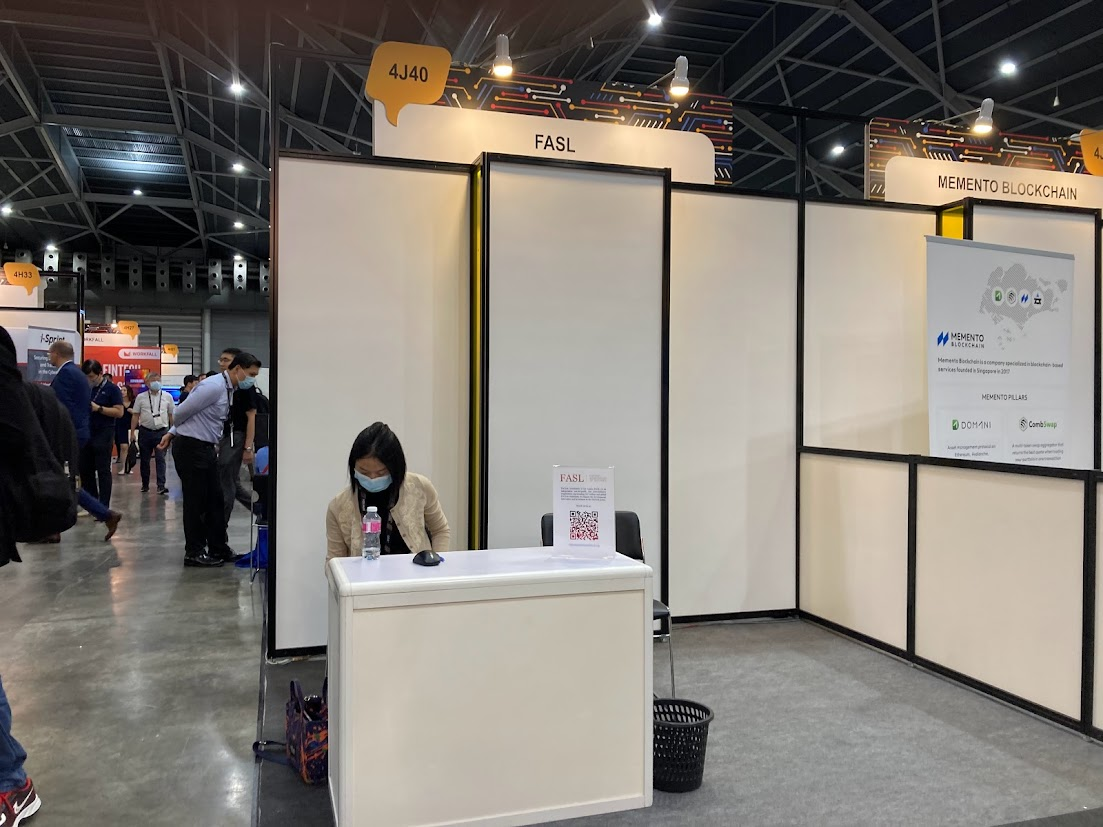
In 2022, the Fintech Association of Sri Lanka (FASL) participated as a community partner at the Singapore FinTech Festival.

FinTech Association of Sri Lanka (FASL) is an independent, not-for-profit organization representing the fintech community in Sri Lanka and fostering connections with the global fintech sector.

FASL is closely collaborating with the Central Bank of Sri Lanka (CBSL) on fintech-related issues; and a number of fintech events related to FASL were represented by CBSL.

== History ==
Establishing 'Fintech Association of Sri Lanka' was initiated at the 'Fintech Meetup' of the 'Asia-Pacific Executives Forum' which was held at Hilton Colombo in July 2018; where the Central Bank of Sri Lanka Assistant Governor Ananda Jayalath also participated and delivered a speech on regulatory role of Central Bank on Fintech.

== Governance ==
FASL is governed by an executive committee that consists of a president, vice president, general secretary and other committee members. The executive committee is advised by an advisory board consisting of industry experts.

== Collaborations ==
=== International partnerships ===
The Fintech Association of Sri Lanka (FASL) has established formal partnerships with regional and international fintech associations as part of its cross-border engagement strategy. These include memoranda of understanding with counterpart organisations in Singapore, Hong Kong, Japan, the Philippines, and Indonesia, as well as participation in the ASEAN Financial Innovation Network. These partnerships are aimed at facilitating ecosystem collaboration, knowledge exchange, and market access for fintech stakeholders.

FASL has also served as an ecosystem partner of the Dubai International Financial Centre (DIFC) Innovation Hub and Elevandi (now the Global Finance & Technology Network (GFTN), supporting regional fintech connectivity and policy dialogue across Asia and the Middle East.

In October 2026, FASL issued a statement in Daily FT seeking clarification on the Asia FinTech Alliance (AFA)'s membership selection process following the admission of FinTech Forum, Sri Lanka as AFA's member association from Sri Lanka. The statement acknowledged that AFA Chairwoman Jaclyn Tsai had clarified that AFA membership did not confer exclusive representation of Sri Lanka's fintech ecosystem. FASL said its separate questions about the selection criteria and opportunities for consideration remained unanswered at the time.

=== Events ===
FASL has participated as a community partner, supporter institution, or regional co-organiser in a range of fintech conferences and summits across Asia and the Middle East. These have included major industry platforms such as the Singapore FinTech Festival, Hong Kong FinTech Week, and regional fintech summits held in cities including Shanghai, Singapore, Hong Kong, Mumbai, Dubai, and Colombo.

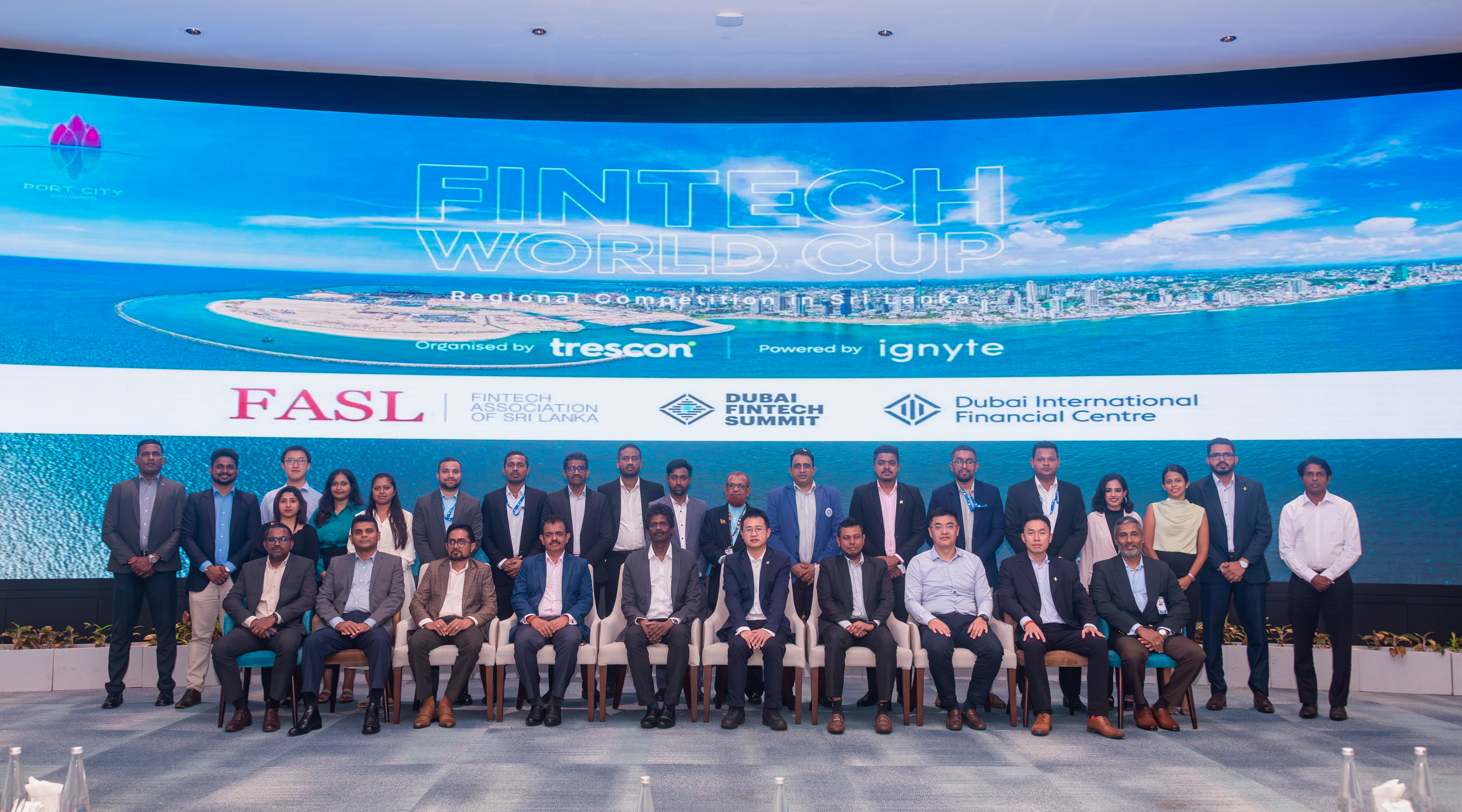
In April 2025, the FinTech Association of Sri Lanka (FASL), in partnership with Port City Colombo, hosted the Regional Competition of the FinTech World Cup at Port City Colombo.

In April 2019, FASL was a supporter institution of the Chain Plus: Asia-Pacific Blockchain New Finance Summit, organised by The Blockchainer and the Singapore FinTech Association at Mandarin Oriental, Singapore, where its president moderated a panel discussion on security token offerings.

In 2019, FASL endorsed the "Fintech Futures" innovation broadcast organised by Colombo Innovation Tower (CIT), which discussed banking innovation, artificial intelligence, digital payments, and financial inclusion in Sri Lanka.

In 2019, FASL was a collaborating partner of the FinX Awards in Dubai, which included the MENA Fintech Hackathon at the American University in Dubai and an awards ceremony at Jumeirah Zabeel Saray. At the hackathon, Sri Lankan startup Helios P2P participated in the Al Baraka challenge, while iLoan was selected for the Emirates NBD challenge.

In 2020, FASL was named a strategic partner of HatchX, a fintech accelerator established by Hatch and the Lankan Angel Network (LAN), with support from the Ford Foundation. The programme aimed to connect fintech startups with financial regulators, banks, investors and industry experts.

In 2020, FASL was named a community partner of Seamless Middle East, organised by Terrapinn at the Dubai World Trade Centre.

In April 2021, FASL signed a memorandum of understanding with the Singapore-based ASEAN Financial Innovation Network (AFIN) to support fintech development and promote the Application Programming Interface Exchange (APIX) platform in Sri Lanka and the wider region.

FASL was represented the 2022 Global COVID-19 Fintech Market Impact and Industry Resilience Study, published by the Cambridge Centre for Alternative Finance in collaboration with the World Bank Group and the World Economic Forum.

FASL served as a knowledge partner for the 2022 and 2023 editions of the Asian Digital Finance Forum & Awards, hosted by the Asian FinTech Academy (AFTA) in Colombo. The events brought together participants from financial institutions, the fintech industry and academia.

In May 2024, FASL was a partner of the Future Skills Forum organised by the Centre for Finance, Technology and Entrepreneurship at the Museum of the Future in Dubai.

In April 2025, FASL hosted the Sri Lankan round of the FinTech World Cup at Port City Colombo as part of its role as an association partner of the Dubai FinTech Summit 2025, supporting local startups' participation in the global competition. The event brought together startups, investors, and ecosystem stakeholders from South Asia and neighbouring regions.

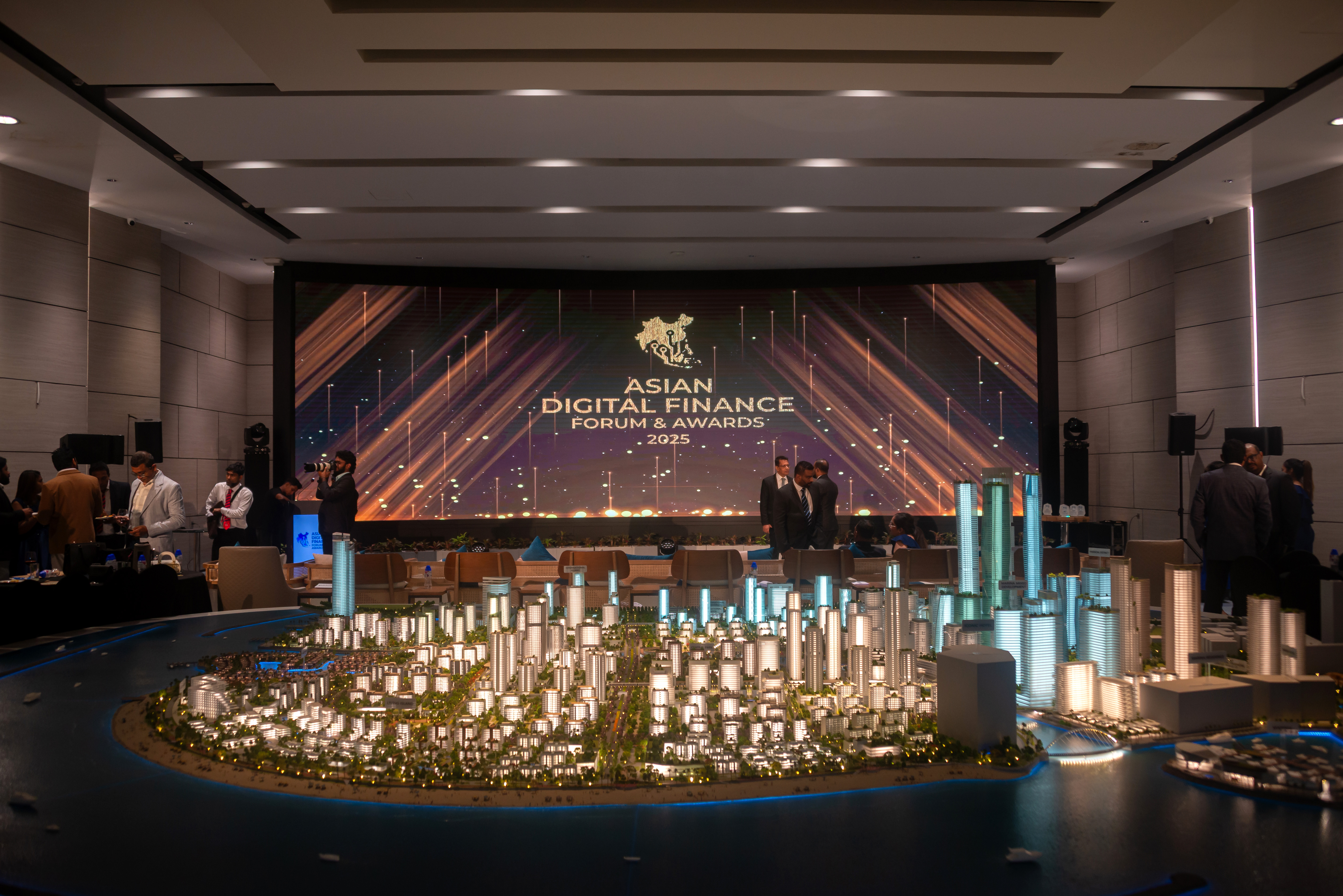
Asian Digital Finance Forum & Awards 2025, co-organised by the Fintech Association of Sri Lanka at Port City Colombo.

In October 2025, FASL co-organised the Asian Digital Finance Forum & Awards with the Asian FinTech Academy (AFTA) at Port City Colombo, contributing to regional dialogue on digital finance, artificial intelligence, and innovation as part of the Asia International Digital Economy & AI in Finance Summit.

In March 2026, Following the FinTech World Cup Sri Lanka Regional Competition, FASL announced a strategic collaboration with the Singapore-based APIX Platform to support cross-border fintech innovation, digital sandbox initiatives, and international ecosystem connectivity linking South Asia, Southeast Asia, and the Middle East.

In May 2026, FASL announced that India’s RealX and Sri Lanka’s NanoSoft Global had been named joint winners of the FinTech World Cup Regional Competition held at Port City Colombo, following evaluations by an international jury panel.

In June 2026, FASL participated as an ecosystem partner of the SLASSCOM National Ingenuity Awards 2026, held at ITC Ratnadipa in Colombo.

=== Education and training ===
FASL has undertaken education and professional development initiatives aimed at building fintech capacity in Sri Lanka. Since 2019, the association has organised regular fintech workshops, introductory programmes, and professional certification courses in collaboration with academic and industry partners, targeting professionals, students, and policymakers.

The association has collaborated with the University of Hong Kong through its HKU FinTech initiative in delivering seminars and public discussions on fintech-related topics, including blockchain applications, security token offerings, and financial innovation frameworks in Asia.

In December 2021, FASL organised a Lithuanian fintech meetup in Colombo in collaboration with the Lithuanian Embassy in New Delhi and Hatch, a Sri Lanka–based fintech accelerator, as part of its international ecosystem engagement activities.

In July 2024, FASL conducted an introductory lecture on artificial intelligence at Little Flower Convent in Karampon, Jaffna, with resource support from HKU FinTech and Elevandi. The initiative aligned with Sri Lanka's national efforts to integrate artificial intelligence and machine learning into the school curriculum.

FASL founding president with Financial Technology undergraduates at the University of Kelaniya following a guest lecture under the National Artificial Intelligence Awareness Programme, October 2026.

In October 2026, FASL commenced university-level engagement under its National Artificial Intelligence Awareness Programme with a guest lecture for Financial Technology undergraduates at the University of Kelaniya. Delivered by FASL founding president Rajkumar Kanagasingam, the lecture covered financial technology, Generative AI, Agentic AI and responsible AI adoption in financial services, incorporating selected educational resources from the University of Hong Kong's Introduction to FinTech course and the Global Finance & Technology Network's (GFTN) Insights educational resources. The initiative followed discussions on AI awareness and capacity building with Sri Lankan Prime Minister Harini Amarasuriya at Temple Trees in January 2026 and a subsequent proposal submitted to the Prime Minister's Office.

=== Policy initiatives ===
In October 2023, FASL initiated the preparation of a report titled Enhancing Colombo International Financial City (Port City Colombo) as a Leading Fintech Hub in South Asia, intended for submission to the President of Sri Lanka. The initiative was supported by international fintech experts and led by Professor Douglas W. Arner of the University of Hong Kong as chief consultant.

An interim report released in July 2024 proposed establishing a Fintech Innovation Hub within the Colombo International Financial Centre to support innovation, investment and cross-border collaboration. It was presented that year to Dinesh Weerakkody, then Chairman of the Colombo Port City Economic Commission, and Sopnendu Mohanty, then Chief FinTech Officer of the Monetary Authority of Singapore.

In April 2025, FASL presented the report to CHEC Port City Colombo Managing Director Xiong Hongfeng during the FinTech World Cup Regional Competition. Drawing on the DIFC Innovation Hub and Singapore's fintech ecosystem as models, the report recommended regulatory sandboxes, innovation licences and partnerships with technology companies, financial institutions and universities.
