= University of Hong Kong Faculty of Law =

Law school in Hong Kong

Faculty of Law of The University of Hong Kong 香港大學法律學院
- Established: 1969 as the Department of Law
- School type: Faculty
- Dean: Fu Hualing
- Location: Pokfulam, Hong Kong
- Enrollment: 1,810 (2023)
- Faculty: 80 (2025)
- Website: https://www.law.hku.hk

The Faculty of Law of The University of Hong Kong (Chinese: 香港大學法律學院; commonly known as HKU Law) is one of the 11 faculties and schools at the University of Hong Kong. Founded in 1969 as the Department of Law, it is the oldest law school in Hong Kong. HKU Law is consistently ranked among the top law schools in the world. In 2019, HKU Law was ranked 18th on the QS World Rankings and 22nd on the Times Higher Education World Rankings.

HKU Law has produced many distinguished alumni, including current chief justice Andrew Cheung, three permanent judges of the Court of Final Appeal, three secretaries for justice, one-third of Hong Kong's senior counsel, and more than twenty members of the Executive Council and Legislative Council.

== History ==
=== Background ===
Law was first taught at the University of Hong Kong in the 1920s and 1930s, but only as a component of a broad-based arts degree, and not as a standalone subject. Contemporary efforts to create colonial Hong Kong's first law school were met with opposition, with Colonial Office records showing apparent concern that such a law school might produce "half-baked lawyers" who would cause "political trouble".

At the time, all barristers and most solicitors practising in Hong Kong were educated, trained and qualified in the United Kingdom. As a result, only the wealthy could afford the education that could lead to a career in the law. William Kirk Thomson, a senior government lawyer who served as Registrar-General from 1958 to 1968, remarked that it was "little short of tragic that the doors to a great profession are virtually closed to a large number of men and women who have not had the good fortune to be born into wealthy homes".

In September 1964, the Department of Extra-Mural Studies at HKU initiated a five-year pilot scheme in which the Department offered part-time evening classes that led to an external LLB degree from the University of London.

=== Founding and early years ===
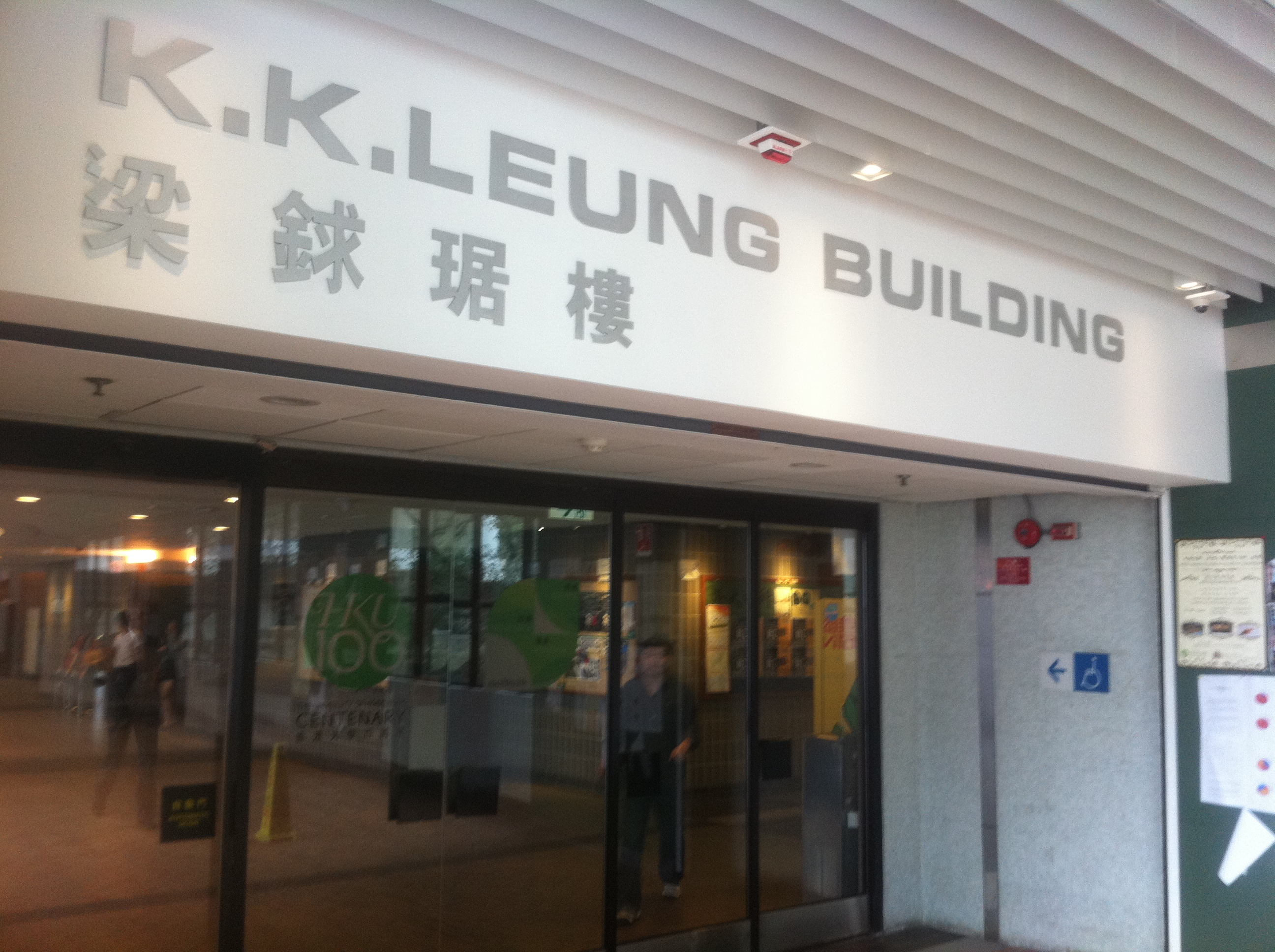
The K.K. Leung Building, where the faculty was located from 1989 to 2012

Upon the conclusion of the five-year pilot programme in 1969, the Department of Law was established under the Faculty of Social Sciences, with Dafydd Evans, a professor on secondment from the London School of Economics who had previously taught some of the part-time evening courses, becoming the inaugural head of the department. The department opened its doors in September 1969 with three academic staff and 40 students; the first classes, which formed part of a three-year programme leading to an LLB, were conducted in the former Police Married Quarters on 154-158 Caine Road. The three-storey block of flats served as the department's home until July 1973, when the department moved to the fifth floor of the newly constructed Knowles Building, which allowed the law library to increase its collection tenfold, from 1,500 volumes to 14,000.

The department launched the Hong Kong Law Journal in 1971, with Henry Litton and Gerald de Basto as co-founders of the publication. By 1972, the student body had grown to 115. That same year, the department began offering the PCLL, which, in conjunction with the first batch of LLB graduates the same year, created the first fully local pathway for graduates to train and qualify as lawyers in Hong Kong, replacing the previous system in which entry to the legal profession was based on exams on English law administered by the Law Society of England and Wales. The department awarded its first PhD in 1976.

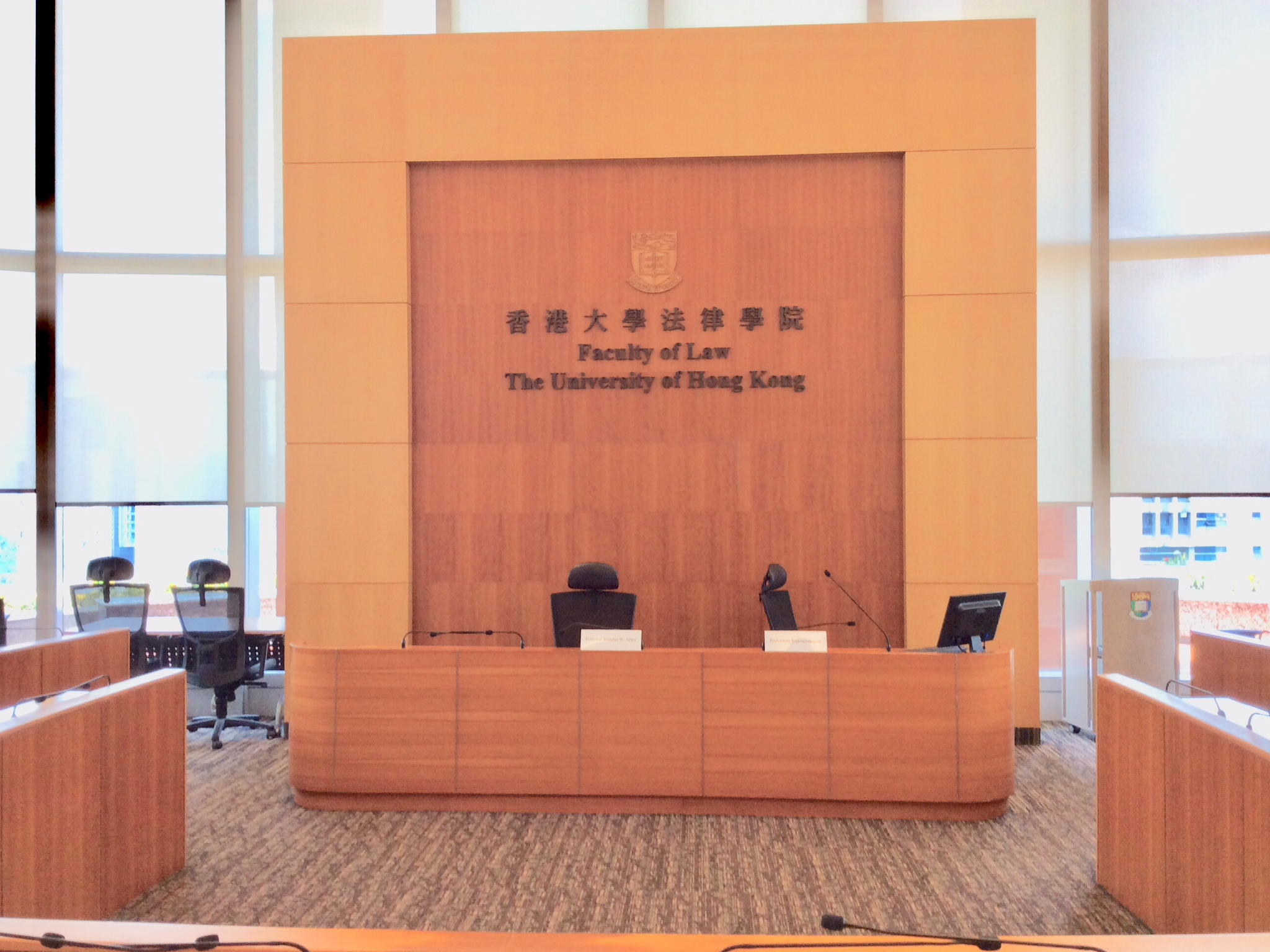
Academic conference room in the Faculty of Law building

=== Development ===
The logo of the faculty during its 55th anniversary in 2024

The department split from the Faculty of Social Sciences to become the autonomous School of Law in 1978, and became a faculty in its own right in 1984. By then, the faculty had two departments, the Department of Law, headed by Bob Allcock, who would later go on to be Solicitor General of Hong Kong, and the Department of Professional Legal Education, headed by Peter Willoughby, with the total number of academic staff exceeding 30. In 1986, the faculty introduced its first Master of Laws programme, focusing on Chinese and international trade law. Peter Rhodes succeeded Dafydd Evans as dean in 1987.

The faculty moved to the K.K. Leung Building in 1989, occupying three floors, with the law library more than quadrupling in size. In 1995, the faculty established the Center for Comparative and Public Law, its first research centre.

=== 21St century ===
HKU Law jointly created the Law and Technology Centre with the Department of Computer Science in 2001. The centre runs the Hong Kong Legal Information Institute, which provides free online access to legislation, case law and other legal materials, and also operates the Hong Kong Community Legal Information Centre.

The faculty moved to a dedicated building located in the newly constructed Centennial Campus in 2012. The 11-floor tower, named after businessman Cheng Yu Tung, houses faculty offices, the law library, student societies, classrooms, and lecture theatres.

In 2024, the faculty adopted a unitary structure, merging the former Department of Law and Department of Professional Legal Education.

== Academics ==
=== Centres ===
HKU Law is home to seven research centres and institutes.

- Centre for Comparative and Public Law (1995)
- Asian Institute of International Financial Law (1999)
- Law and Technology Centre (2001)
- Philip K.H. Wong Centre for Chinese Law (2009)
- Centre for Medical Ethics and Law (2012)
- Centre for Interdisciplinary Legal Studies (2023)
- Centre for Private Law (2025)

=== Degrees offered ===
The faculty offers a 4-year Bachelor of Laws program, four 5-year double-degree programs: BSocSc (Government and Laws) - LLB, BBA (Business and Laws) - LLB, BA (Literary Studies) - LLB, and BSc - LLB in conjunction with other faculties of the university, a 2-year intensive JD program (for non-law graduates), a professional qualification program (PCLL), and a variety of LLM programmes focusing on human rights, Chinese law, Compliance and Regulation, corporate law and financial law, information technology and intellectual property, and arbitration. It also offers various research postgraduate programs, including MPhil, PhD and SJD.

Six members of the faculty have been conferred the honour of Teaching Fellows by the University, rendering it one of the Departments with the largest number of Teaching Fellows in the University. The faculty also plays host to many scholars and academic conferences each year. The faculty works closely with the legal profession. Its PCLL programme provides an entry qualification to the legal profession in Hong Kong.

== Student life ==
Students in the faculty are represented by the Law Association, which is affiliated with the Hong Kong University Students' Union (HKUSU). The association publishes Vox Populi, a bi-annual publication that focuses on current affairs, and organises career events, talks, and social events for students. It formerly published Justitia, a law review, until 1986.

In addition to the faculty-run Hong Kong Law Journal, the faculty has also published the student-run law review Hong Kong Journal of Legal Studies since 1994. The faculty also has had successes in international moot court competitions, having won moots such as the Hong Kong Red Cross International Humanitarian Law Moot and LAWASIA Moot in the past.

== Notable alumni ==
=== Government ===
The faculty has alumni serving or formerly served in all three branches of government.

==== Judiciary ====
Over half of the judges in the higher courts are graduates of HKU Law. As of September 2024, this included 25 of the District Court's 41 judges, 15 of 28 Court of First Instance judges, and 10 of 13 Justices of Appeal.

- Simon Li, former Vice-President of the Court of Appeal, candidate in the 1996 Chief Executive election
- Andrew Cheung GBM, 3rd Chief Justice of the Court of Final Appeal
- Carlyle Chu, Vice-President of the Court of Appeal
- Christopher Chan Cheuk, former Registrar of the High Court and former President of the Law Society
- Jeremy Poon, 5th Chief Judge of the High Court of Hong Kong
- Johnson Lam, Vice-President of the Court of Appeal
- Maria Yuen, Justice of Appeal
- Patrick Chan GBM, former Permanent Judge of the Court of Final Appeal
- Susan Kwan, Vice-President of the Court of Appeal
- Thomas Au, Justice of Appeal
- Wally Yeung GBS, former Vice-President of the Court of Appeal

==== Executive ====
- Andrew Liao GBM GBS SC JP, former Member of the Executive Council
- Anna Wu, former Member of the Executive Council and Legislative Council
- David Leung SC, 6th Director of Public Prosecutions
- Elsie Leung GBM, 1st Secretary for Justice
- Keith Yeung SC, 5th Director of Public Prosecutions
- Paul Lam, 5th Secretary for Justice
- Rimsky Yuen GBM SC JP, 3rd Secretary for Justice
- Roy Tang, former permanent secretary for constitutional and mainland affairs, former Commissioner of Customs and Excise, former Director of Broadcasting

==== Legislative ====
- Albert Ho, former Member of the Legislative Council, candidate in the 2012 Chief Executive election
- Alan Leong SC, former Member of the Legislative Council, former Chairman of the Bar Association
- Audrey Eu SC, former Member of the Legislative Council, former Chairman of the Bar Association
- Dennis Kwok, former Member of the Legislative Council
- Margaret Ng, former Member of the Legislative Council
- Ronny Tong SC, Member of the Executive Council, former Member of the Legislative Council, former Chairman of the Bar Association
- Tanya Chan, former Member of the Legislative Council

=== Politics and activism ===
- Yvonne Leung, barrister, student leader in the 2014 Occupy Central protests, former president of the Hong Kong University Students' Union
- Brian Leung Kai-ping, localist activist

=== Academia ===
- Albert Chen, Member of the Hong Kong Basic Law Committee, former Dean of the Faculty of Law
- Benny Tai, associate professor of law at HKU, democracy activist and initiator of Occupy Central
- Eric Cheung Tat-ming, legal scholar
- Johannes Chan, SC (Hon) the only Honorary Senior Counsel in Hong Kong, former Dean of the Faculty of Law

=== Media and entertainment ===
- Kevin Lau, former editor-in-chief of Ming Pao
- Nicola Cheung, musical artist and actress
- Sinnie Ng, musical artist
- Valerie Chow, actress

== List of deans ==
No.	Dean	Tenure	Notes
1	Dafydd Emrys Evans	1969 - 1987	Longest serving
2	Peter Rhodes	1987 - 1993	First Hong Kong-born dean
3	Peter Wesley-Smith	1993 - 1996	Also HKU Law's first PhD graduate
4	Albert Chen	1996 - 2002	First HKU LLB graduate to become dean
5	Johannes Chan	2002 - 2014	HKU LLB and PCLL graduate
6	Michael Hor	1 July 2014 - June 2019	
7	Fu Hualing	2019 - present	

== Notable current and former professors ==
- Yash Ghai, Chairman of the Constitution of Kenya Review Commission (2000–2004)
- Albert Chen, member of the Basic Law Committee and the Law Reform Commission of Hong Kong
- Alec Stone Sweet
- Anthony Carty
- Benny Tai
- Daniel A. Bell
- Douglas W. Arner
- Johannes Chan SC (Hon), human rights lawyer, Chairman of the Management Committee of the Consumer Legal Action Fund, and member of the Bar Council of the Hong Kong Bar Association
- Raymond Wacks, professor of Law and Legal Theory

=== Visiting professors ===
- Francis Reynolds, emeritus professor of law at the University of Oxford, author of Bowstead and Reynolds on Agency
- Sarah Worthington DBE KC (Hon), former Downing Professor of the Laws of England at the University of Cambridge

=== Honorary professors ===
- Andrew Li GBM CBE KC SC JP, first Chief Justice of Hong Kong after the Handover
- Geoffrey Ma GBM KC SC , former Chief Justice of Hong Kong
- Grenville Cross GBS KC SC, former Director of Public Prosecutions of Hong Kong
- Michael Kirby AC CMG, former Justice of the High Court of Australia

== See also ==
- The Asian Institute of International Financial Law
- Chinese University of Hong Kong
- City University of Hong Kong
- Postgraduate Certificate in Laws
- The University of Hong Kong
