= Colombo Port City Economic Commission =

Sri Lankan government agency

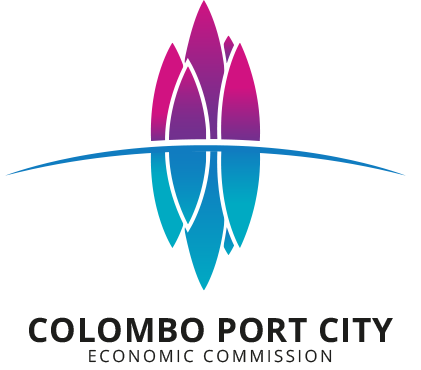

Agency overview
- Formed: 2021; 4 years ago
- Jurisdiction: Government of Sri Lanka
- Headquarters: Unit 901, 9th Floor, One Galle Face Tower, 1A Centre Road, Colombo 02, Sri Lanka; 6°55′40″N 79°50′43″E
- Minister responsible: Anura Kumara Dissanayake, Minister of Finance, Planning and Economic Development
- Agency executive: Harsha Amarasekera, Chairman
- Parent department: Ministry of Finance, Planning and Economic Development
- Key document: Colombo Port City Economic Commission Act, No. 11 of 2021
- Website: portcitycolombo.gov.lk

The Colombo Port City Economic Commission is a government agency in Sri Lanka, established in 2021 under the Colombo Port City Economic Commission Act, No. 11 of 2021. It is entrusted with the administration, regulation and oversight of all business and operational matters within the Port City Colombo authority area.

== Powers, Duties and Functions ==
The Colombo Port City Economic Commission is responsible for overseeing and promoting the Colombo Port City. Its duties include issuing registrations, licences, authorisations, regulating investments and managing land leases within the Port City area. As the central authority, it also functions as a single window investment facilitator, in order to streamline investment and business process. The Commission is also tasked with developing and enforcing community rules and development control regulations to ensure alignment with the Colombo Port City's master plan.

== Structure ==
The Colombo Port City Economic Commission consists of five to seven members, including the chairperson, appointed by the President of Sri Lanka. Appointments are based on expertise and recognition in related fields. Members serve a term of three years.

The current members of the Commission, appointed on 14 December 2024, include:

1. Harsha Amarasekera (Chairman)
2. Amal Cabraal
3. Harsha Subasinghe
4. Ray Abeywardena
5. Parakrama Dissanayake
6. Sanjay Kulatunga
