= Albert Chen Hung-yee =

Legal scholar from Hong Kong

Albert Hung-yee Chen JP SBS GBS
- 陳弘毅
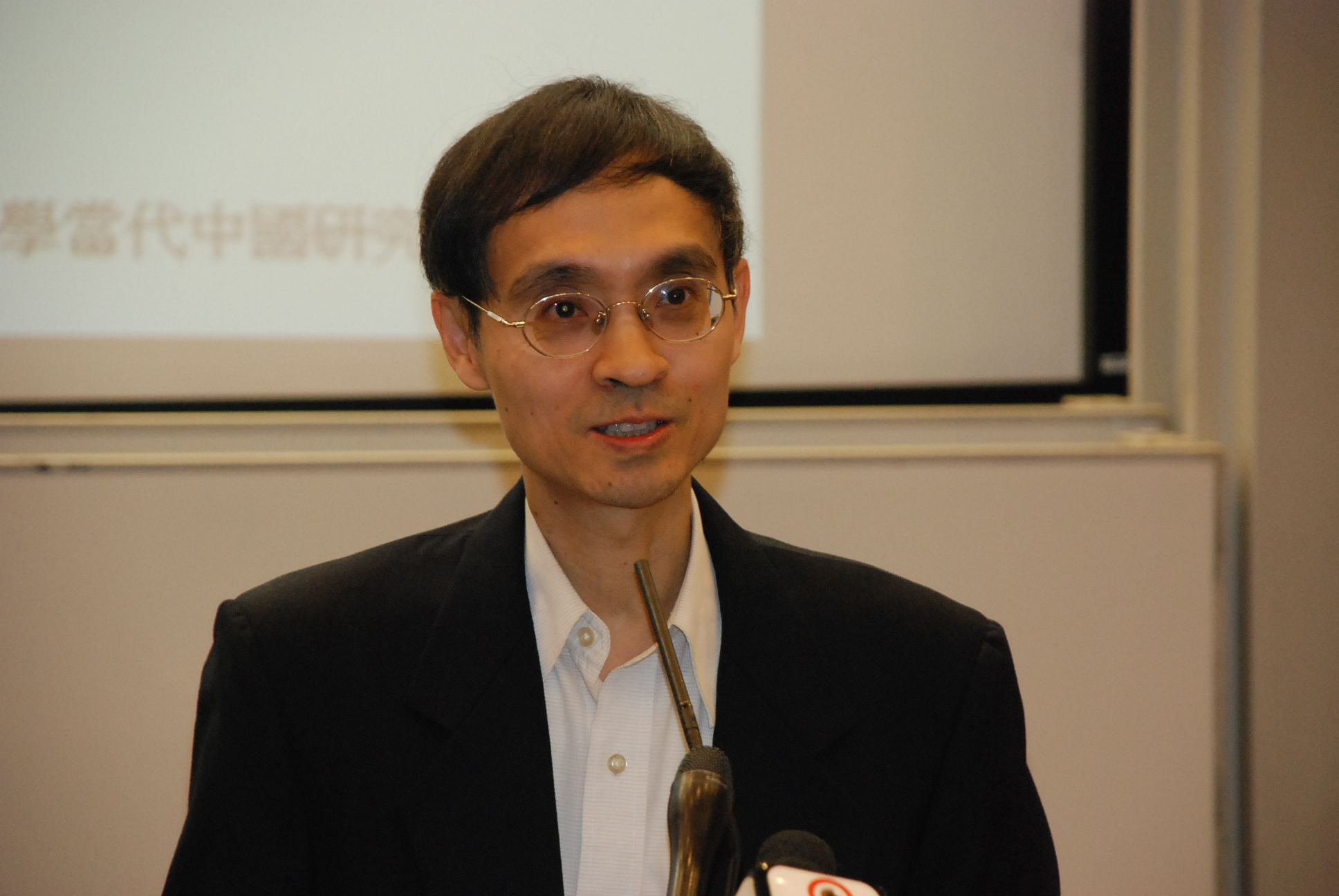
- Chen in 2013
- Born: 1957 (age 68–69); Hong Kong
- Education: University of Hong Kong (LLB, PCLL); Harvard University (LLM)

Academic background
- Thesis: The theory of law and development: past, present and future : an essay in search of law and development, the philosophy and sociology of law and comparative law (1982)

Academic work
- Discipline: Constitutional law research
- Institutions: University of Hong Kong

Chinese name
- Traditional Chinese: 陳弘毅
- Simplified Chinese: 陈弘毅
Transcriptions
Standard Mandarin
- Hanyu Pinyin: Chén Hóngyì
Yue: Cantonese
- Yale Romanization: Chàhn Wàhng Ngaih
- Jyutping: Can^{4} Wang^{4} Ngai^{6}

Albert Chen Hung-yee (born 1957) is a Hong Kong legal scholar, specialising in constitutional law. He is the current Cheng Chan Lan Yue Professor in Constitutional Law and the Chair of Constitutional Law at the Faculty of Law of the University of Hong Kong, and was the Dean of the faculty from 1996 to 2002.

== Early life and education ==
Chen was born in 1957. His father was a civil servant and father and his mother a teacher. He graduated from the St. Paul's Co-educational College in Hong Kong in 1975, then entered the University of Hong Kong for a LLB degree, completing in 1980. Chen then went to Harvard University and obtained his LLM 2 years later, studying comparative law and theories of law and development. After returning to Hong Kong, Chen worked at a solicitors' firm, and completed his Postgraduate Certificate in Laws (PCLL) in 1984, qualifying him as a solicitor.

== Career ==
Chen started his academic career in 1984, becoming a lecturer at the University of Hong Kong (HKU) at the age of 27. At the time he was the only legal scholar at the university who spoke Chinese. He was promoted to senior lecturer in 1988, and full professor in 1993. Chen was the Head of the HKU Department of Law between 1993 and 1996, when he was appointed Dean of the HKU Faculty of Law until 2002. He was the first Chinese to serve in either position. In 2007, Chen was endowed with the Chan Professorship in Constitutional Law, which was renamed to Cheng Chan Lan Yue Professorship in Constitutional Law in 2015. Chen became the Chair of Constitutional Law in 2021.

In 1995, Chen was enlisted as one of the Hong Kong Affairs Advisors. This position was jointly appointed by the Chinese government agency Hong Kong and Macau Affairs Office and the Hong Kong office of Xinhua News Agency.

Since 1997, Chen has been a member of the Hong Kong Basic Law Committee of the National People's Congress Standing Committee (NPCSC).

Chen is an ex-officio member of the Legal subsector of the Election Committee of Hong Kong for the term between 2021 and 2026.

== Political positions ==
During the 2014–2015 Hong Kong electoral reform, Chen advised the opposition pro-democracy camp that they should accept the government's proposal as their ideal electoral system was impossible to achieve. He also proposed that "none of the above" be an additional option on the Chief Executive ballot. When "none-of-the-above" votes, or blank votes, account for over half of all ballots cast, the result would be nullified and a 1200-member nominating committee would elect a provisional Chief Executive. However, political groups were generally not welcoming of the proposal, and it was not accepted.

In 2019, the Hong Kong government proposed the 2019 Hong Kong extradition bill to amend the city's extradition mechanism. Chen voiced his concerns of the bill, including the difficult position Hong Kong's courts would be in when judging the law of Mainland China. He suggested that extraditable offences be limited to the most serious crimes, extraditions be applicable only to crimes committed after the bill was passed, and that Hong Kong residents be excluded from extraditions.

The National People's Congress Standing Committee (NPCSC) of China passed changes in the Hong Kong electoral system in 2021, allowing only "patriots" to serve as the Chief Executive and in the Hong Kong legislature. Chen responded that the electoral system will attract candidates deterred by the past political environment, previously with a large number of pan-democrats, who may not be suited to participate in elections but nonetheless are willing to serve Hong Kong.

In October 2022, HKU's mandatory national security course featured Chen in the first video lecture; the video was criticised for failing to contextualise real-life scenarios.

== Personal life ==
Chen is married.

== Honours and awards ==
- Justice of the peace, Hong Kong (2002)
- Silver Bauhinia Star, Hong Kong (2010)
- Gold Bauhinia Star, Hong Kong (2021)
