= Prime Marina =

Marina-front residential development in Colombo, Sri Lanka

General information
- Status: Under construction
- Type: Residential
- Location: Marina District, Port City Colombo, Colombo, Sri Lanka

Design and construction
- Developer: Prime Melwa Port City (Pvt) Ltd (Prime Group & Melwa Group)

Website
- primemarina.lk

Prime Marina is a luxury marina-front residential development located within the Marina District of the Port City Colombo in Colombo, Sri Lanka.

== History and Background ==
Prime Marina developed as a joint venture between Prime Group and Melwa Group (Prime Melwa Port City), the project is a designated Business of Strategic Importance (BSI) under the Colombo Port City Economic Commission framework. The development forms a key part of the multi-billion-dollar Foreign Direct Investment (FDI) pipeline within Sri Lanka's financial and maritime hub. Following the launch of the initial phases, subsequent projects like Prime Marina 2 were introduced to expand the ultra-luxury marina frontage and residential footprint.

Prime and Melwa acquired over four acres of direct marina-front land in Port City Colombo for US$ 57.6 million, with a projected total turnover of approximately US$ 250 million for the development. The Sale & Purchase Agreement was formally executed with CHEC Port City Colombo in May 2026.

== Architecture and Amenities ==
Designed as a high-rise residential complex, Prime Marina offers panoramic views of the Indian Ocean and the Port City marina basin. Key features of the development include:

- Exclusive marina-front access and proximity to yacht piers.
- Luxury residential apartments featuring sustainable design elements.
- High-end lifestyle amenities, including infinity pools, fitness centers, sky lounges, and landscaped promenade integrations.

The towers feature 1, 2, 3 and 4-bedroom apartments and exclusive penthouses, architecturally authored by P&T Singapore, with interior design by Index Design Pte Ltd and landscape architecture by Grant Associates of the UK. The Prime Marina Sales Suite at Port City Colombo was unveiled as the first of its kind in the region.

== See also ==
- Port City Colombo
- Colombo
- Economy of Sri Lanka
