= Hatch (Sri Lanka) =

Sri Lankan business incubators

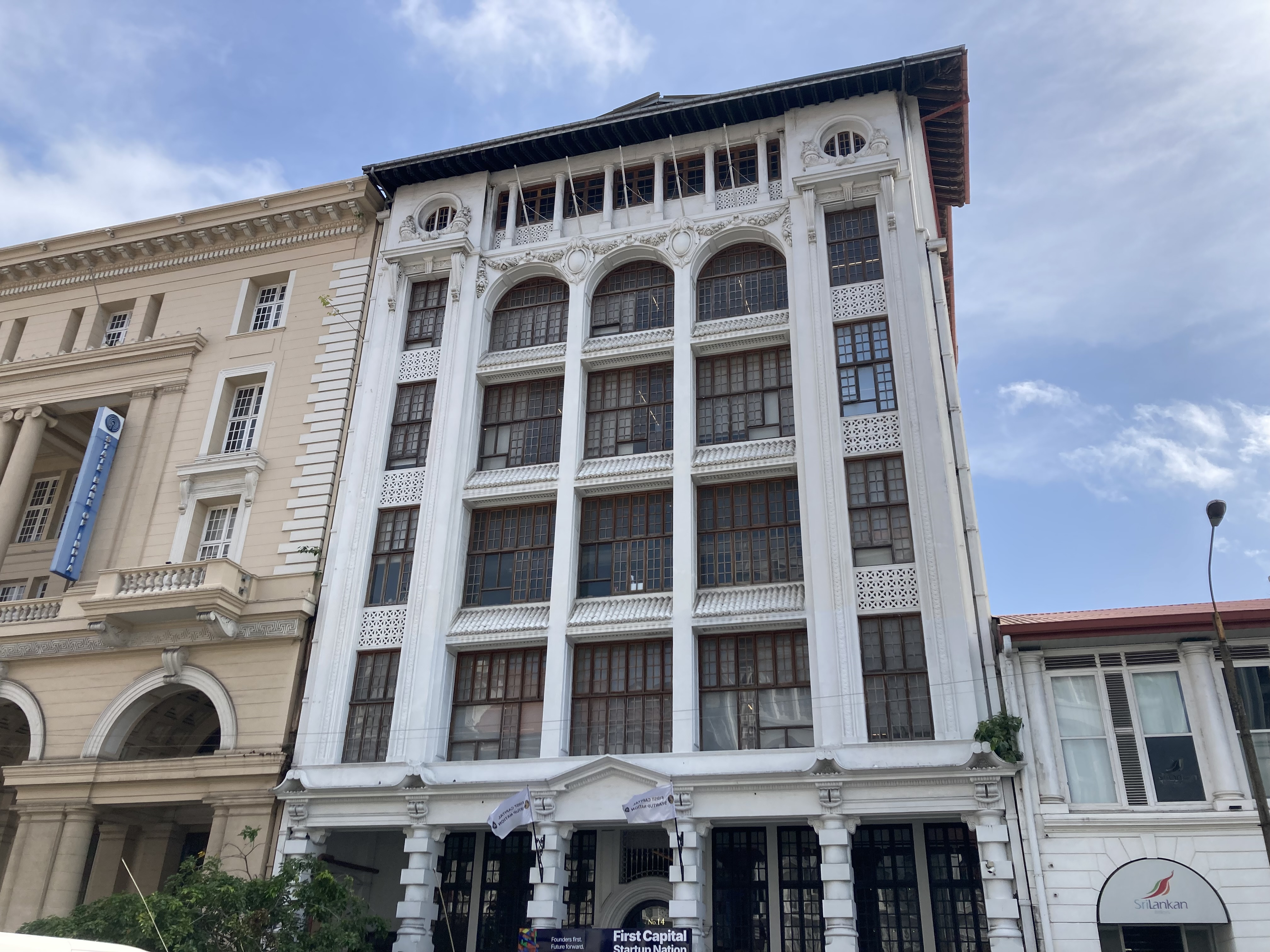
- Hatch head office, Colombo Fort, a six-story Edwardian building (1910).
- Industry: Co-working space; Startup incubator
- Founded: 2018; 8 years ago
- Founders: Jeevan Gnanam (CTO); Brindha Selvadurai-Gnanam; Nathan Sivagananathan
- Headquarters: 14 Sir Baron Jayatilaka Mawatha, Colombo, Sri Lanka
- Key people: Dilhan Fernando (Chairman); Suresh Pathirana (Group CEO); Mevan Peiris (CEO)
- Website: www.hatch.lk

Hatch is a co-working space and startup incubator based in Sri Lanka, with its headquarters in Colombo and a branch in Jaffna. It aims to foster innovation, entrepreneurship, and collaboration by providing modern facilities, networking opportunities, and mentorship for emerging startups.

Hatch offers a collaborative environment designed to support the growth of early-stage businesses.

Hatch also supports a variety of initiatives, including accelerator programs, educational workshops, and business development services, making it a key player in Sri Lanka’s startup ecosystem.

== Background ==
Hatch was founded in 2018 by Jeevan Gnanam, Brindha Selvadurai-Gnanam, and Nathan Sivagananathan.

Hatch officially launched its 60,000-square-foot facility on January 24, 2019, providing space for over 1,000 individuals and housing more than 115 startups.

Hatch is located at 14 Sir Baron Jayatilaka Mawatha (formerly Prince Street) in the Colombo Fort area, once a thriving financial hub in South Asia. The six-story Edwardian building, dating back to 1910, was the tallest in Colombo Fort during colonial times and previously housed Harrisons & Crosfield and the Foreign Ministry, among others, before falling into disrepair.

When the Hatch founders first saw the building, it was extremely run-down and being used as a musty warehouse by a government agency. According to co-founder Selvadurai, 'It was rats to cats to bats in there when we first saw it, but it had something very special.'

Later, the founders secured the dilapidated building and thoughtfully renovated it to preserve its historical character, incorporating spaces with abundant natural light, an inner courtyard, and a design that allows visibility from the top floor down to the lobby.

The strategic location in the heart of Colombo’s business district enhances its accessibility and prominence within the city’s commercial landscape.

== Programs ==
Hatch plays a pivotal role in Sri Lanka’s startup ecosystem by offering a range of initiatives tailored to support early-stage businesses.

- Accelerator Programs: Hatch has implemented 18 business incubator and accelerator programs, engaging with over 700 startups in Sri Lanka. Notable programs include:
  - AccelerateHer: Launched in partnership with the U.S. Department of State, this accelerator is tailored for female founders, providing capacity funding, curated workshops, mentorship, and access to a global network.
  - HatchX: Sri Lanka’s first fintech accelerator, established in collaboration with the Lankan Angel Network and supported by the Ford Foundation with the strategic partnership of Fintech Association of Sri Lanka, aims to bridge the gap between innovative startups and financial regulators.
  - GoviLab: An AgriTech accelerator launched in partnership with Sarvodaya to foster innovation in sustainable agriculture.
- Educational Workshops: Hatch offers workshops focused on strategy, operations, business development, product design, technology, growth, public relations, branding, and talent management to address knowledge gaps among entrepreneurs.
- Business Development Services: Hatch provides support in areas such as import and export documentation, accounting services, statutory audits, and income tax assistance, enabling startups to scale their operations effectively.
- Venture initiatives: In January 2026, Hatch Fund Singapore announced its first disclosed investment, committing approximately US$650,000 to Cultive8, an agri-technology company with Sri Lankan origins that is now headquartered in Singapore. The investment marked an early milestone in Hatch Fund Singapore’s activities supporting South Asian startups seeking regional and international expansion.

== Awards ==
"Best Co-Working Space in the World"

Hatch has gained significant recognition within Sri Lanka’s entrepreneurial ecosystem and globally, winning the Best Co-Working Space in the World award at the Global Startup Awards in 2021. This accolade marked the first time a South Asian co-working space received this honor.
