= Bay One Residences Colombo =

Oceanfront residential and retail complex in Colombo, Sri Lanka

General information
- Status: Under construction
- Type: Residential
- Location: Marina District, Port City Colombo, Colombo, Sri Lanka

Technical details
- Floor count: 17

Design and construction
- Developer: International Construction Consortium (Pvt) Ltd

Website
- bayonecolombo.com

Bay One Residences Colombo, stylized as BAY ONE Residences Colombo, is a luxury marina-front residential development located within the Marina District of the Port City Colombo Special Economic Zone in Colombo, Sri Lanka Developed by ICC Port City (Pvt) Ltd, a fully owned subsidiary of International Construction Consortium (Pvt) Ltd (ICC), it is the first residential development to break ground within Port City Colombo.

== History and Background ==
Bay One Residences Colombo was launched on 22 January 2026, marking ICC's entry into Port City Colombo. The groundbreaking ceremony was held on the same day, in the presence of senior national leadership and institutional stakeholders.

The Sales Gallery at Port City Colombo was officially opened on 31 January 2026 as the first residential sales gallery in the precinct. The architectural model was officially revealed on 11 May 2026.

ICC has been granted both Authorized Person (AP) status and Business of Strategic Importance (BSI) status within Port City Colombo.

== Development ==
Situated on a 13,945 square metre prime waterfront plot, Bay One Residences Colombo represents a total investment of approximately US$112 million, inclusive of land and development costs. The development will comprise 231 luxury apartment units, designed to international standards and targeted at both local and international buyers.

According to Port City Colombo, the project offers 1- to 4-bedroom residences and penthouses with panoramic views of the Indian Ocean and the Marina, complemented by world-class amenities and a resort-inspired waterfront lifestyle.

== Construction ==
Piling commenced in February 2026. The substructure was completed in August 2026, with construction progressing to the Garden Floor level and structural works at Level 4 nearing completion by October 2026. Completion is targeted for January 2029. Over 65% of residences had been sold by September 2026.

== See also ==
- Port City Colombo
- Colombo
- Economy of Sri Lanka
