= Port City Colombo =

Multi-services special economic zone in Colombo, Sri Lanka

Port City Colombo කොළඹ වරාය නගරය
- Colombo Port City
- Artist's impression of a fully developed PCC

- Location in Colombo Location in Colombo District Location in Sri Lanka
- Coordinates: 06°56′00″N 79°50′00″E
- Country: Sri Lanka
- City: Colombo
- Established: 17 September 2014

Area
  - Total: 2.69 km^{2} (1.04 sq mi)
- Time zone: UTC+05:30 (Sri Lanka Standard Time)
- Website: www.portcitycolombo.lk

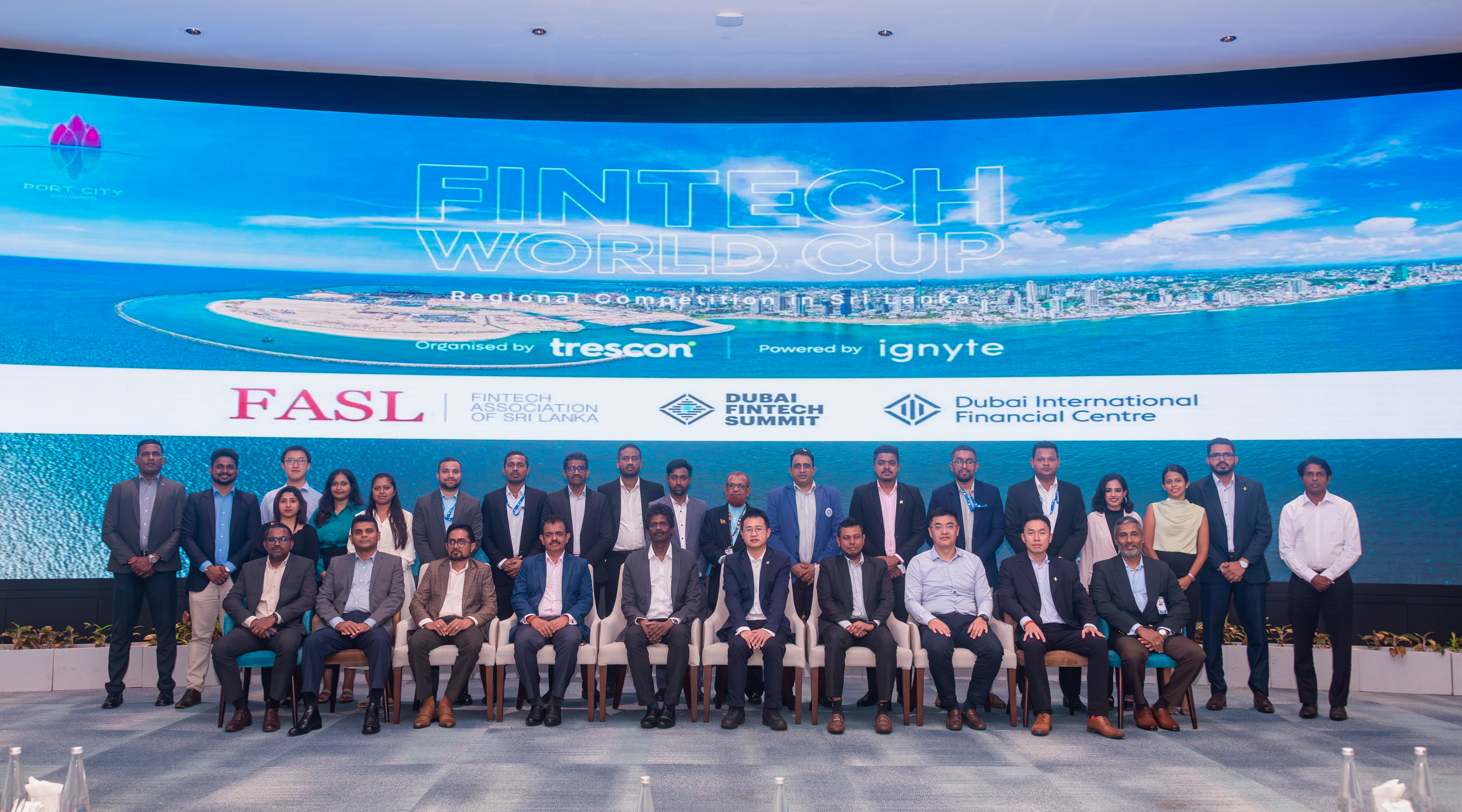
In April 2025, Port City Colombo, in partnership with the Fintech Association of Sri Lanka (FASL), hosted the Regional Competition of the FinTech World Cup at the Port City premises. The event formed part of efforts to position Port City Colombo as an emerging regional centre for financial technology and innovation.

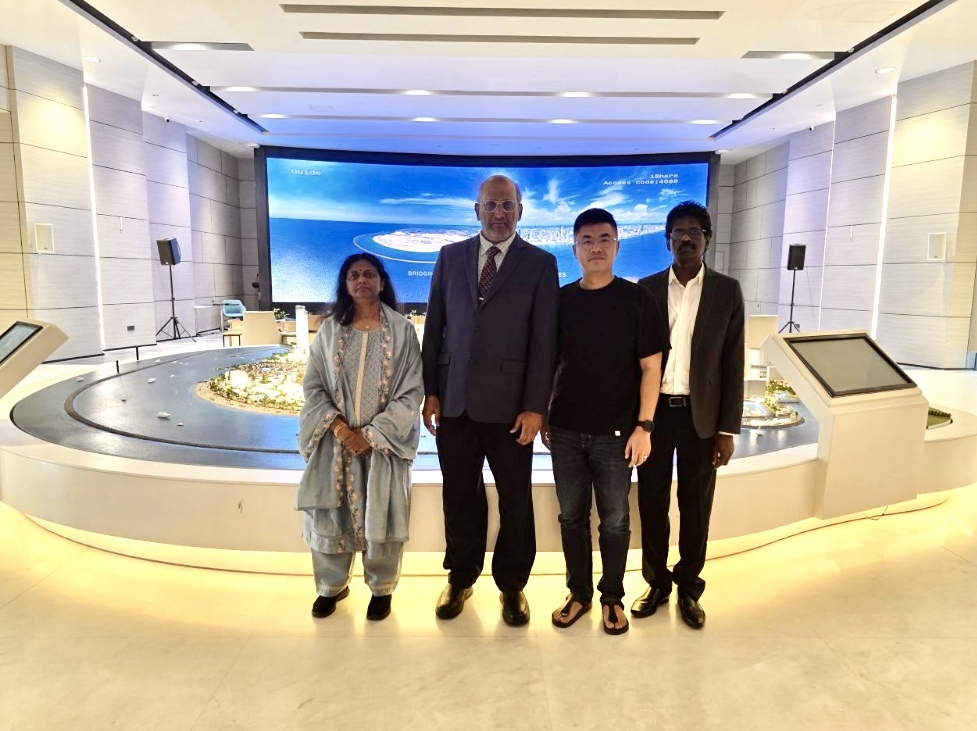
Dr. Sivaguru S. Sritharan, former provost and vice chancellor of the U.S. Air Force Institute of Technology (second from left), during a meeting with the leadership team of Port City Colombo at the site of the future Colombo International Financial Centre (CIFC) in June 2026.

Port City Colombo (Sinhala: කොළඹ වරාය නගරය, romanised: Koḷam̆ba Warāya Nagaraya) is a multi-services special economic zone located in Colombo, Sri Lanka, which is currently under construction on reclaimed land adjacent to the Galle Face Green. The land reclamation work had been completed as of January 2019. In 2017, the cost was slated to be US$ 15 billion. Port City Colombo is a multi-billion-dollar FDI-funded Public Private Partnership (PPP).

Port City Colombo aims to facilitate connections to the South Asian market through investment opportunities, international business environments, and infrastructure developments.

Upon completion, Port City Colombo will feature five distinct precincts: the Financial District, Central Park Living, Island Living, the Marina, and the International Island. The city will additionally encompass over 6.4 million square metres of new developments in residences, healthcare, education, entertainment, hotels, restaurants, retail, and commercial complexes.

In May 2021, the Parliament of Sri Lanka approved the Port City Commission Bill to establish the Colombo Port City Special Economic Zone and Economic Commission. Under this law, companies can be exempt from all taxes, personal, corporate, excise, import, and every other tax for up to forty years.

== Geography ==
Port City Colombo is located in the metropolis of Colombo, Sri Lanka, which is positioned within South Asian trade routes. The master-planned city is to be constructed between the southern edge of the new Colombo South Port and the Fort Lighthouse. The total area of sea to be reclaimed is 269 ha (660 acres).

=== Special Economic Zone ===
The Port City Colombo Special Economic Zone (SEZ), governed by the Colombo Port City Economic Commission (CPCEC), was established under the Colombo Port City Economic Commission Act, No. 11 of 2021 to promote international investment and business services. The SEZ initially offered fiscal and regulatory incentives—including tax holidays of up to 25 to 40 years for 'Businesses of Strategic Importance' (BSIs), unrestricted foreign-exchange transactions in sixteen designated currencies, 100 percent foreign ownership and profit repatriation, and preferential five- to ten-year residence visas for foreign professionals and their dependents.

Under the IMF-supported Extended Fund Facility (EFF) program agreed between 2023 and 2025, Sri Lanka committed to revising these concessions to ensure transparency and fiscal discipline. The government subsequently suspended new tax-holiday approvals under the Port City Act and the Strategic Development Projects (SDP) Act until new, rules-based criteria were enacted.

In September 2025, Regulation No. 01 of 2025 introduced a new incentive framework for BSIs, reducing tax-holiday durations and setting clearer qualifying thresholds. According to KPMG Sri Lanka, new primary BSIs now qualify for corporate-income-tax holidays of 8 to 15 years, while secondary BSIs receive a concessionary 7.5 percent rate for four years.

Despite the fiscal tightening, the SEZ continues to promote investment in service-oriented sectors including information technology and IT-enabled services (IT/ITeS), financial services, logistics and maritime operations, professional services, corporate headquarters operations, tourism, and sustainable urban development.

== Developments ==
The Port City Colombo master plan envisages five precincts: the Financial District, Central Park Living, Island Living, the Marina and the International Island. As of 2026, several private projects have been designated as Businesses of Strategic Importance (BSI) under the Colombo Port City Economic Commission Act.

=== Marina District ===
The Marina District is centred on the yacht marina, which reported commencement of construction with a 2027 completion target.

Three Primary BSIs approved in April 2026 are located in this district: Prime Melwa Port City (Pvt) Ltd and Marina Hotel Holdings (Pvt) Ltd, developing marina-front residential and marina facilities, and Home Lands Port City (Pvt) Ltd in the Central Park precinct.

- Bay One Residences Colombo – First residential development to commence construction within PCC. Developed by ICC Port City (Pvt) Ltd, 231 units, 17-storey tower on a 13,945 sqm waterfront plot, total investment approximately US$112 million. Piling commenced February 2026, superstructure rising as of September 2026, with over 65% of units reported sold and completion targeted for January 2029.
- Prime Marina – Marina-front residential project by Prime Melwa Port City (Pvt) Ltd (joint venture of Prime Group and Melwa Group). Designated as a Primary BSI in May 2026, part of Rs.125 billion combined investment including US$262 million foreign inflows expected over five years.
- Marina hotel – Marina and hotel development on PCC plots held by Marina Hotel Holdings (Pvt) Ltd, also known as Browns Marina Hotel Project, designated as a Primary BSI in March 2026.

=== Central Park Living ===
- Central Park Boulevard – Twin-tower residential development on Plot 1-01-01 in the Central Park District, developed by Home Lands Group. 37 levels, over 640 units, overlooking approximately 40 acres of Central Park green space. Officially launched in June 2026, reported 50% of units sold prior to launch. Piling involved 192 piles, with 100% piling completed on 15 October 2026 within 88 days, with delivery anticipated within 36 months.

=== Financial District and others ===
- Colombo International Financial Centre (CIFC) – Mixed-use complex within the SEZ; the government granted tax exemptions in 2020.
- CEY LAYA – Proposed mixed-use twin-tower development (55 floors) by Clothespin Management and Development (Pvt) Ltd, comprising residences, hotel, offices, retail and a public viewing deck. Reported revised investment value US$595.69 million after repositioning to a new parcel within PCC for DCR flexibility. In June 2026, developer announced private placement of up to €300 million credit-linked notes to support execution.
- Downtown duty-free facility – Urban duty-free mall opened September 2024, operators include One World Duty Free and China Duty Free Group.
- Convention centre, international school, university and hospital – projects announced with Cabinet lease approvals reported in 2023–2025.

== Background ==
The Port City was claimed to be a concept of former President Mahinda Rajapaksa, who was apparently inspired while inspecting the landfill being constructed for the Colombo South port. The modern Port City Colombo was based on a concept proposal submitted by China Harbour Engineering Company

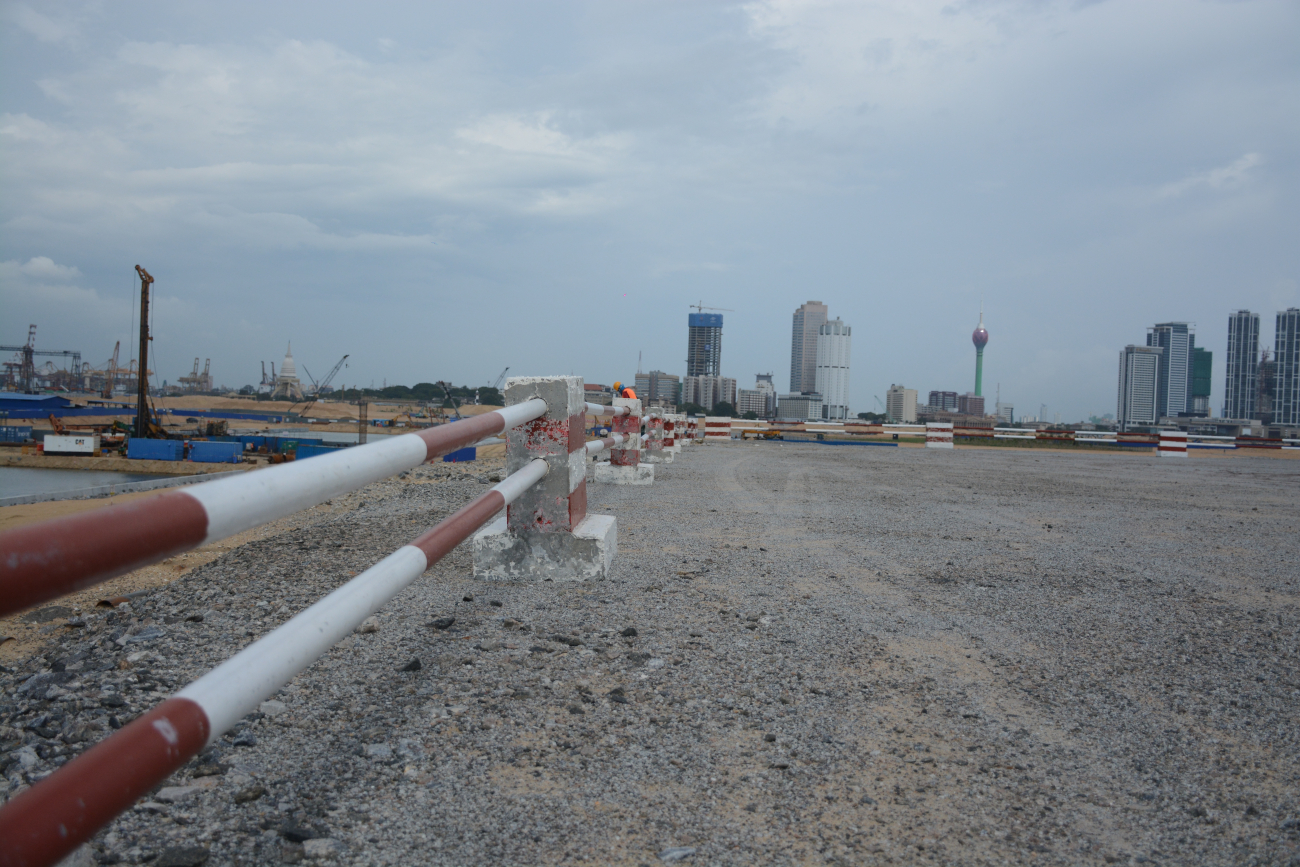
Construction works at Port City

The construction was set to begin in March 2011, but the project was put on hold due to several circumstances. In mid-2012, the Sri Lankan Ports Authority (SLPA) announced that the construction of the then Port City Colombo project would commence on 17 September 2014. The budget was estimated to be $1.4 billion.

The reclamation was to be carried out by China Harbor Engineering Corporation, who has been engaged by the investor.

Construction of the Port City Colombo project was launched on 17 September 2014 by former Sri Lankan President Mahinda Rajapaksa and General Secretary of the Chinese Communist Party Xi Jinping.

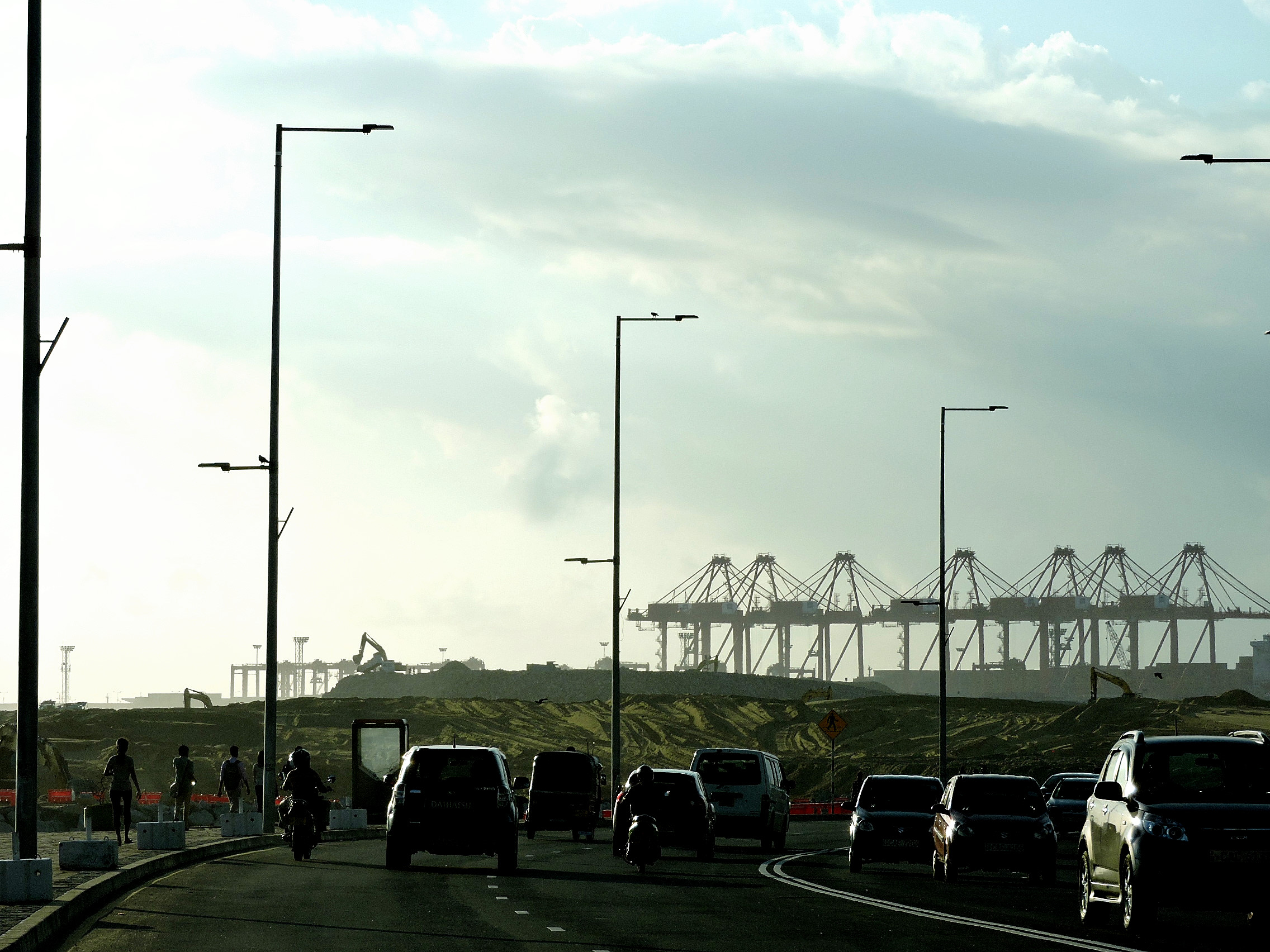
Colombo Port City (land reclamation) seen from the Galle road.

The Port City Colombo was suspended after the end of the Rajapaksa government in 2015 due to alleged claims related to the sovereignty of Sri Lanka and adverse environmental impacts.

The Port City Colombo is governed by an independent authority and will not be subject to the Colombo Municipal Council. A special legal framework would enable it to operate on a subset of commercial law, in terms of contracts and commercial transactions with its own Special Colombo Financial Court serving as the court of first instance and provision of appeal to the Supreme Court of Sri Lanka. It would have its own international commercial dispute resolution center for arbitration proceedings.

=== Land reclamation ===
Port City Colombo consists of around 269 hectares of reclaimed land where all land titles are vested with the Government of Sri Lanka.

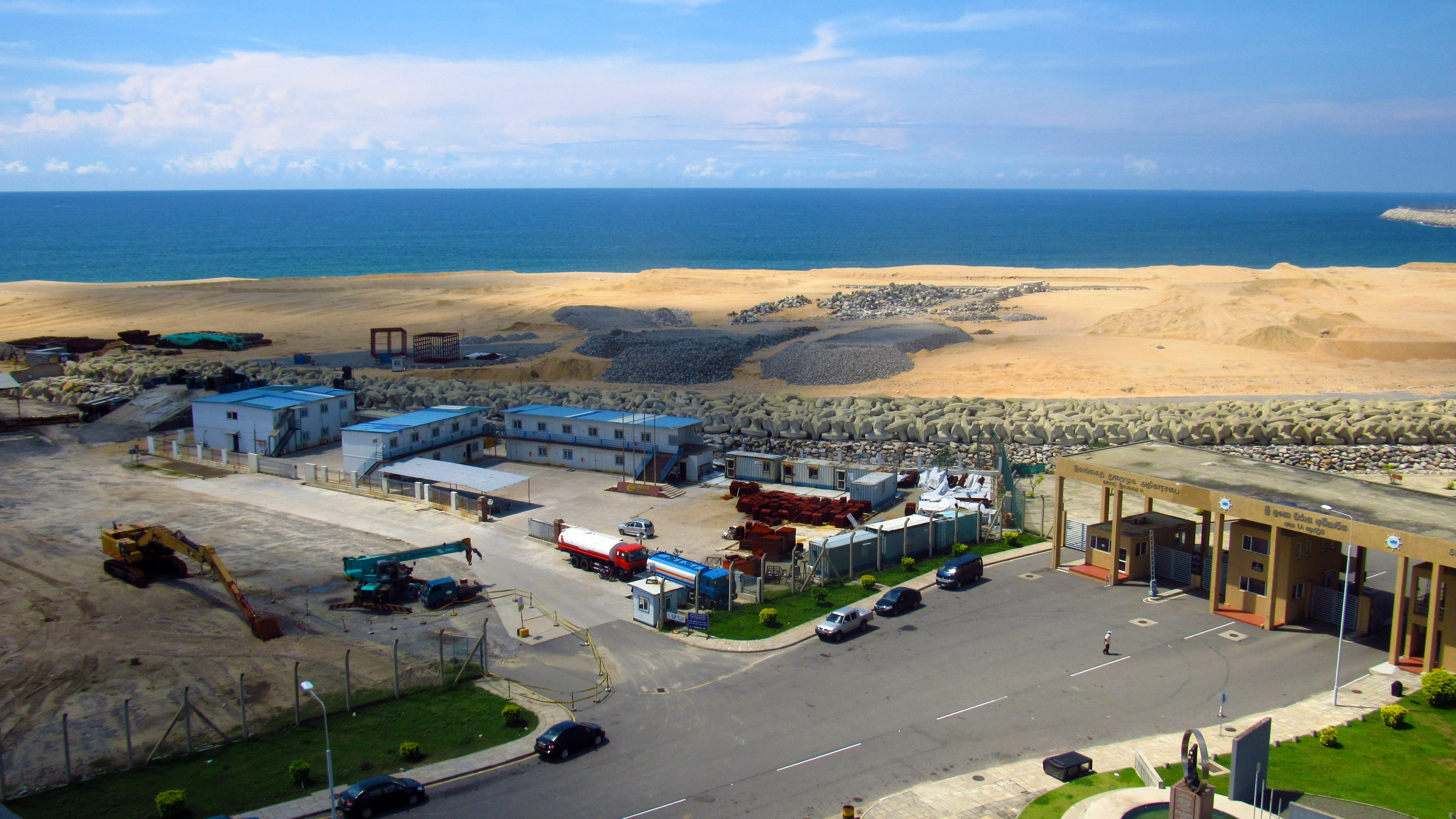
Land reclamation in November 2015

At a question and answer section in July 2018, the Prime Minister stated that the land reclamation would be finished within one year and that construction should begin by next year, and that the government seeking assistance in establishing the legal construct for the administrative area. This was successfully completed in January 2019 according to the Ministry of Megapolis and Western Development.

The project was around three months ahead of its targeted completion as of January 2019.

=== Basic infrastructure ===
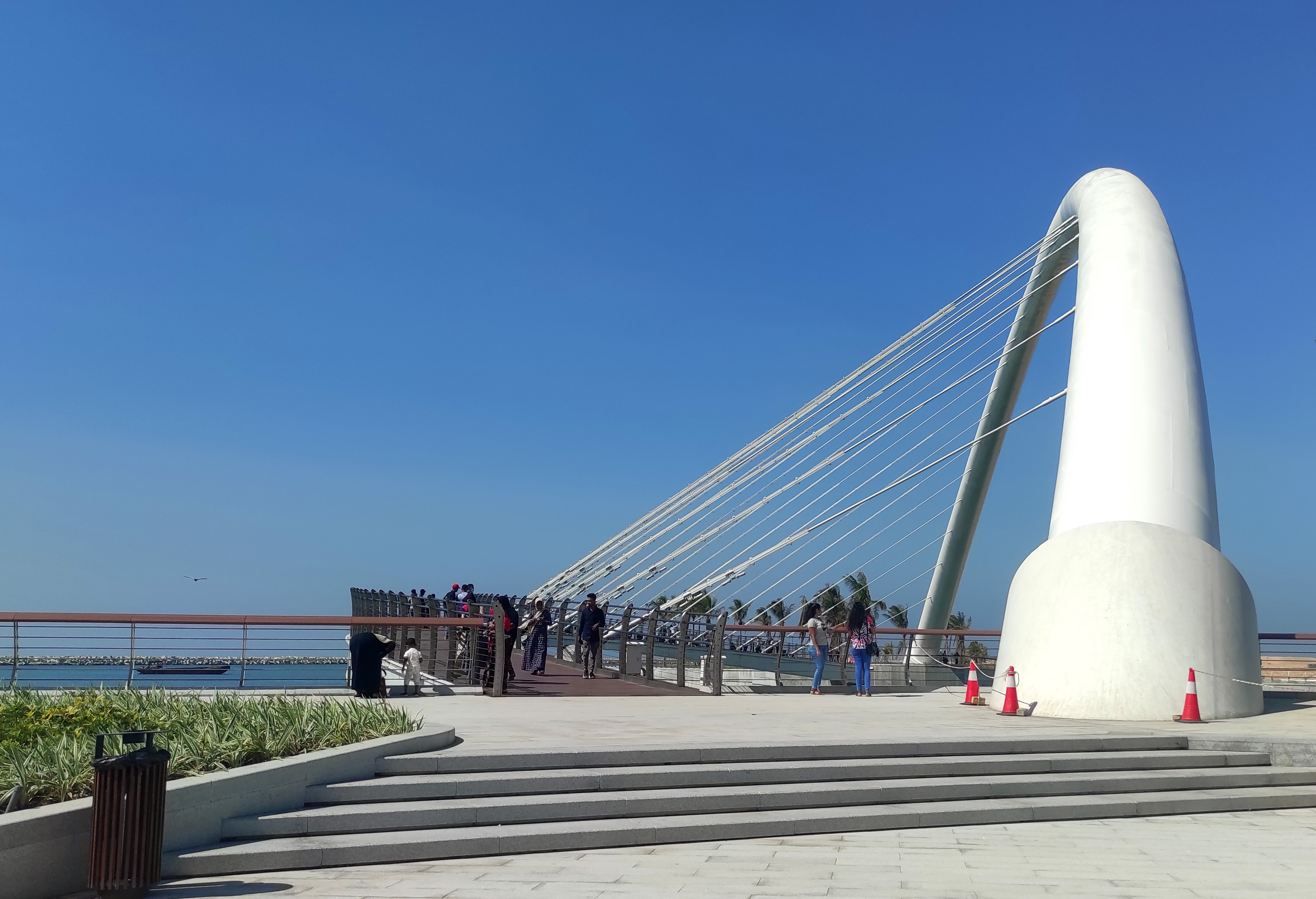
Footbridge in Port City

China Daily reported in April 2019 that the hydro structural construction would be complete by the middle of 2019, with the construction of municipal facilities being completed by July 2020.

The Road Development Authority had sent approval for the new road network and piling work had begun for the nine bridged by January 2019.

== Investments ==
By December 2020, Sri Lankan conglomerate LOLC Holdings leased out five land parcels amounting to $200 million and signed an agreement with China Harbour Engineering for a mixed development project, with the investment value totaling $1 billion. The project includes residential, commercial and retail assets set to break ground in mid-2021. This is the first major investment in Port City Colombo.

== FinTech hub ==
Fintech Association of Sri Lanka (FASL) has launched an initiative to draft a report titled, Enhancing Colombo International Financial City (Port City Colombo) as a Leading Fintech Hub in South Asia to submit to the President of Sri Lanka; the initiative is being assisted by a number of fintech experts globally and Professor Douglas Arner, Kerry Holdings Professor in Law at the University of Hong Kong (HKU) as the chief consultant.

== Sustainability ==
Before land was reclaimed for the development of Port City Colombo, Environmental Impact Assessments (EIAs) were conducted to ensure that the construction of the Special Economic Zone followed sustainable practices.

The layout and development of the city's infrastructure are designed to support sustainability, and the Port City Colombo Master Plan includes several green spaces across the site. Development Control Regulations (DCRs) also incentivise developers who meet green building standards.

Port City Colombo follows eco-friendly infrastructure development practices by adopting sustainable design principles, renewable energy, and energy-efficient building standards. Once construction is completed, the city is expected to feature a non-motorised transport system that encourages walking and cycling through shaded walkways, supported by an integrated Light Rail Transit (LRT) network.

== Reception ==
In October 2025, Port City Colombo was named the "Best Knowledge Zone – Asia Pacific Region" and received a "Highly Commended" citation for Sustainable Zones in the *Global Free Zones of the Year 2025* rankings by fDi Intelligence (Financial Times, UK). It also received the "Visionary Award for Next-Generation Financial Hub Development" at the Asian Digital Finance Forum & Awards 2025, held as part of the Asia International Digital Economy & AI in Finance Summit at Port City Colombo.

== Gallery ==
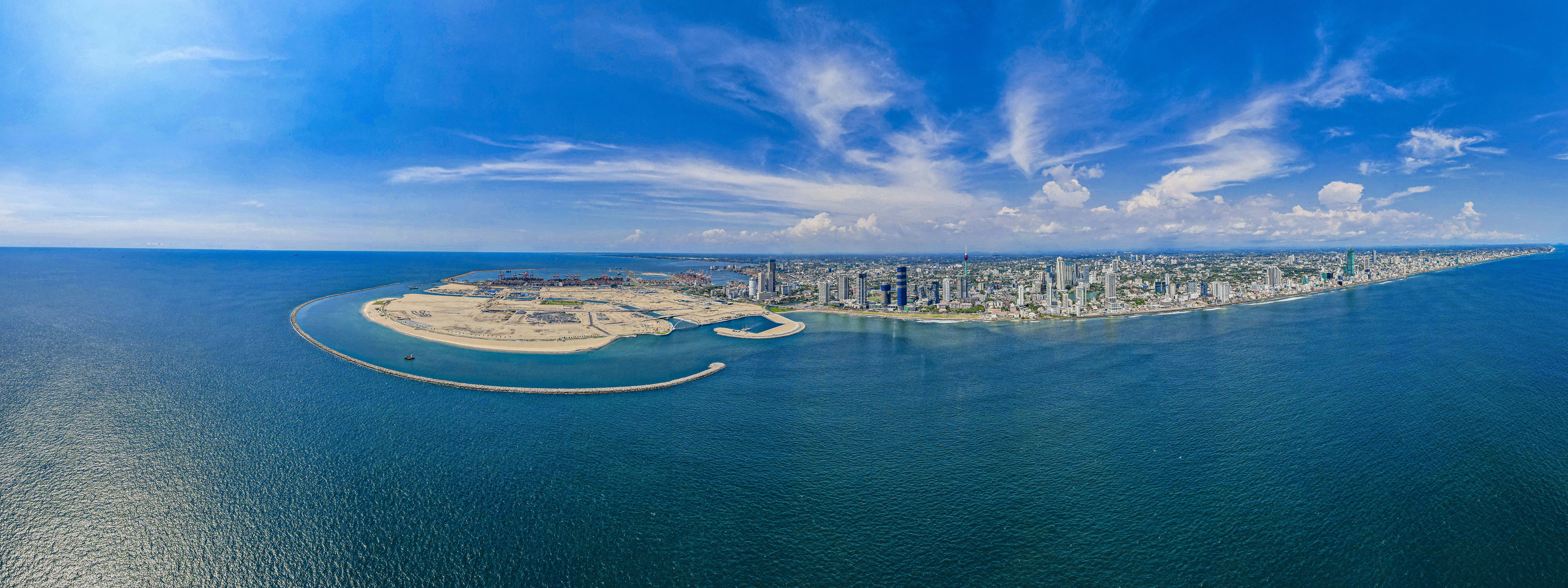
Port City Colombo

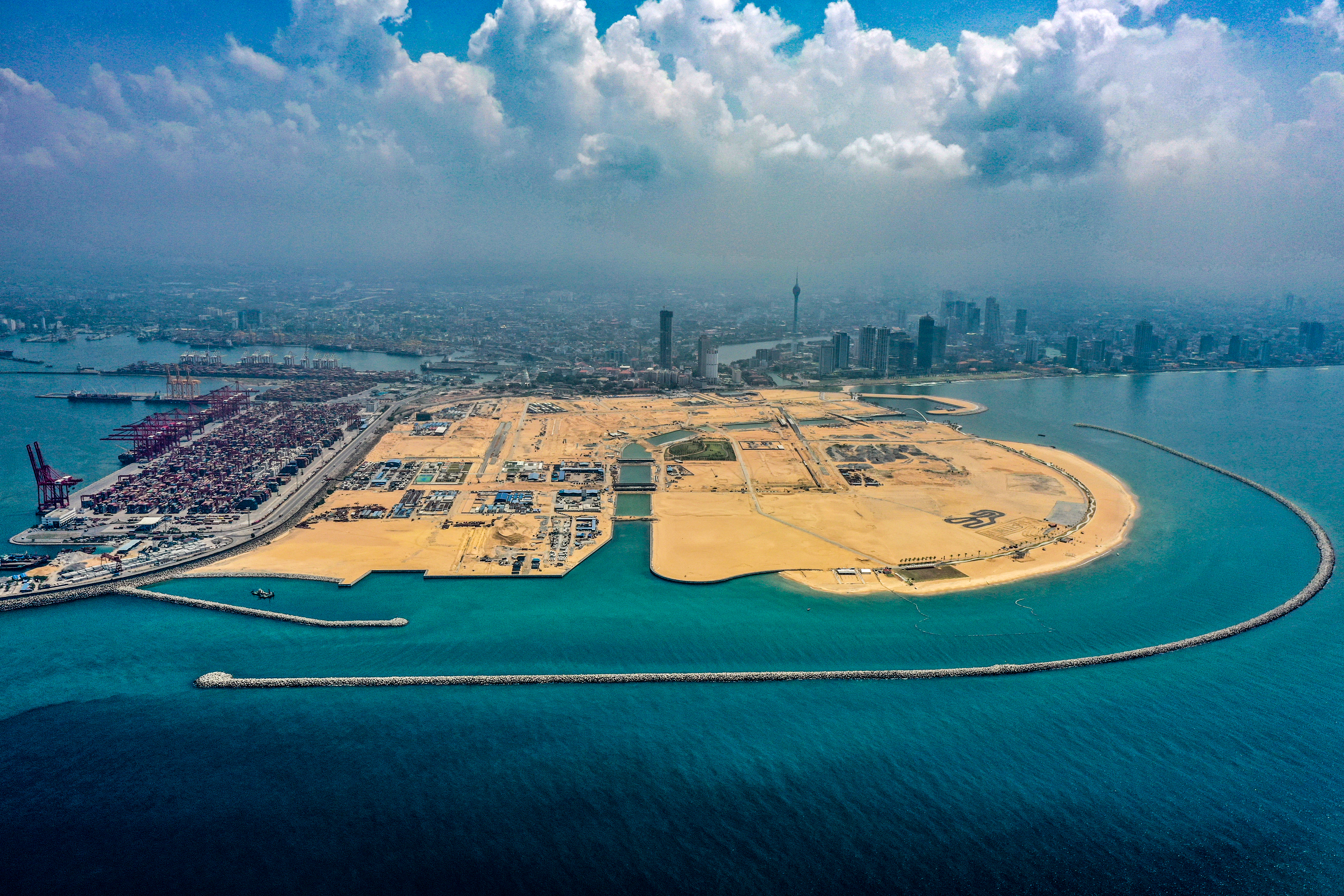
Port City Colombo

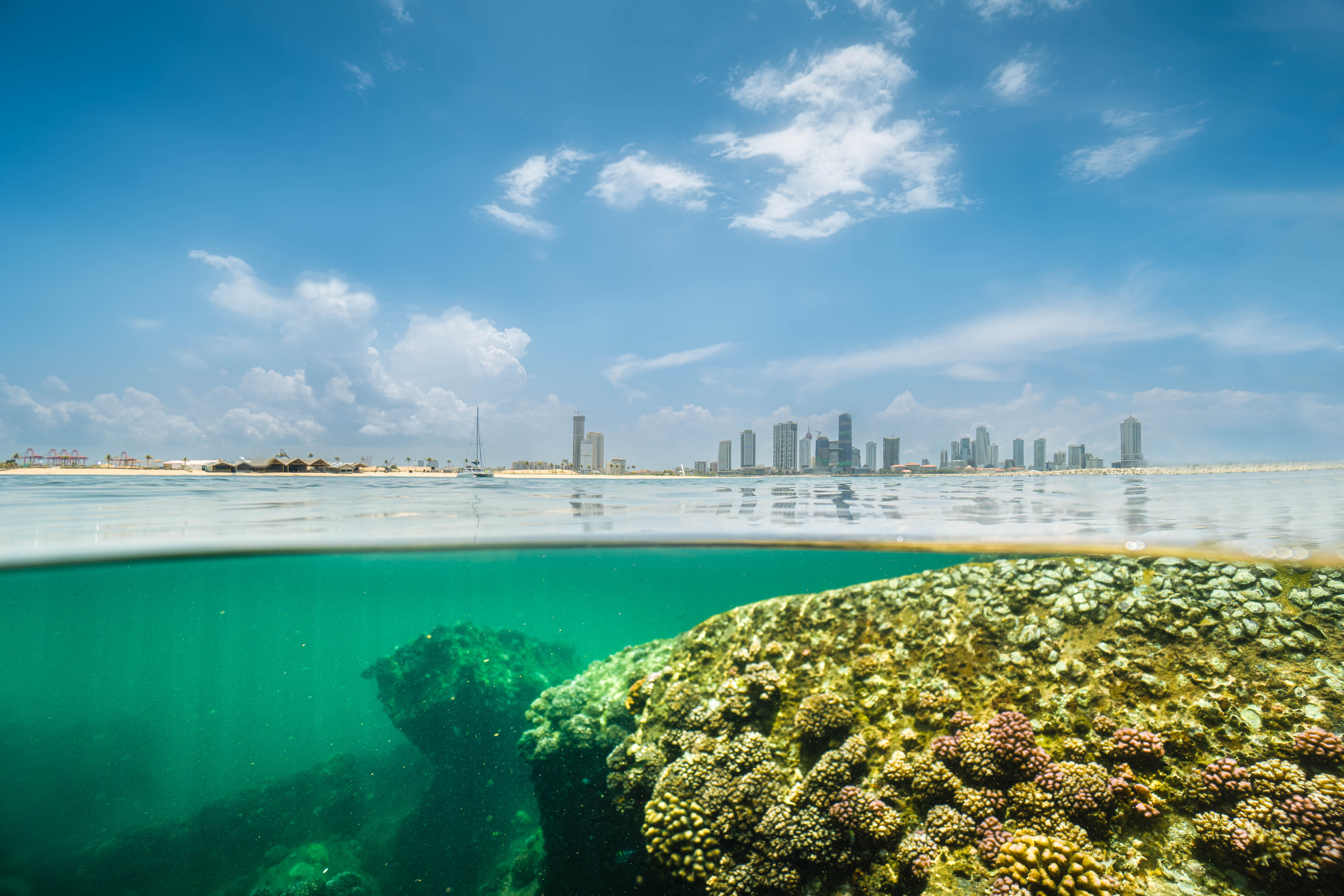
Coral Reef at Port City Colombo

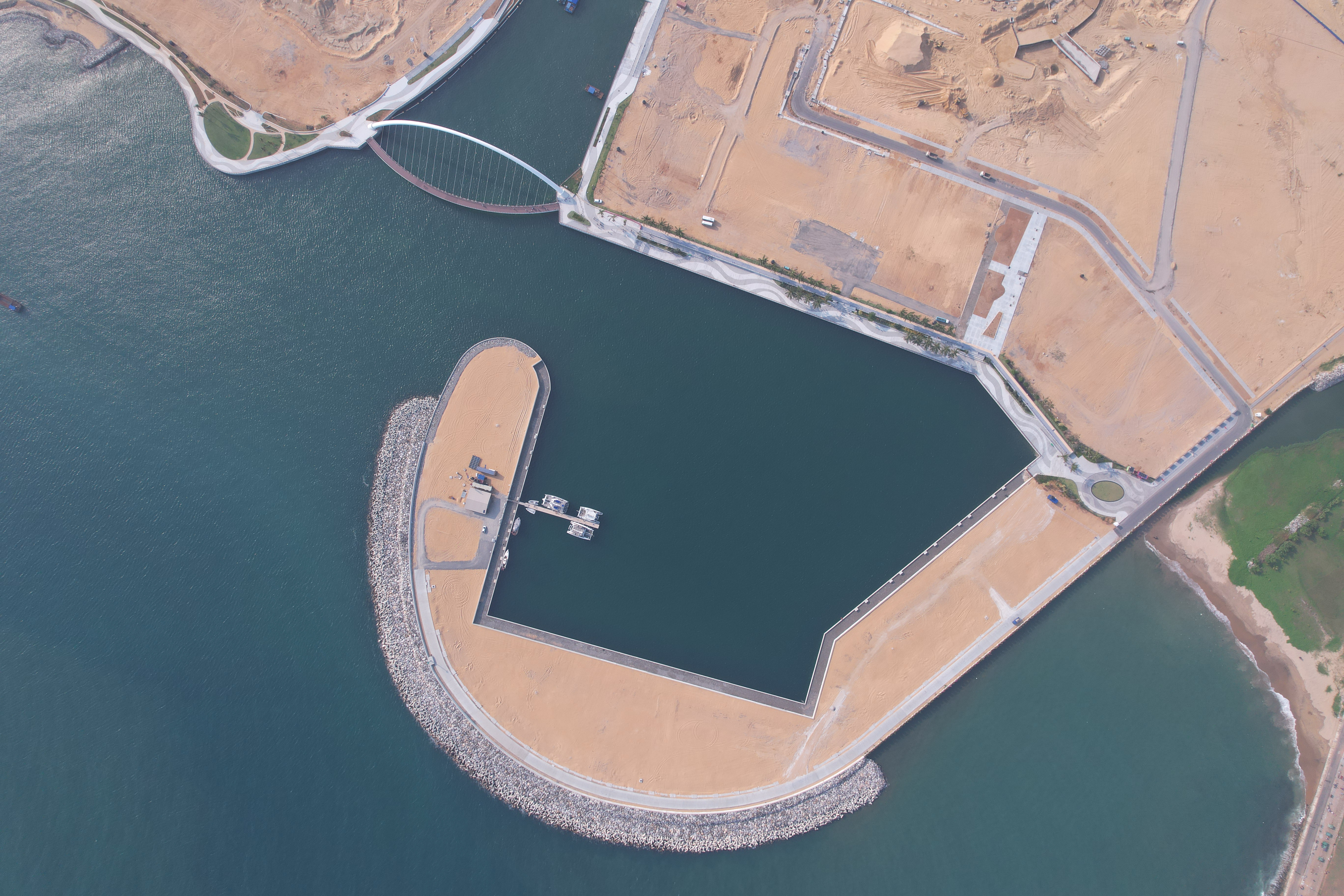
Port City Colombo - Marina

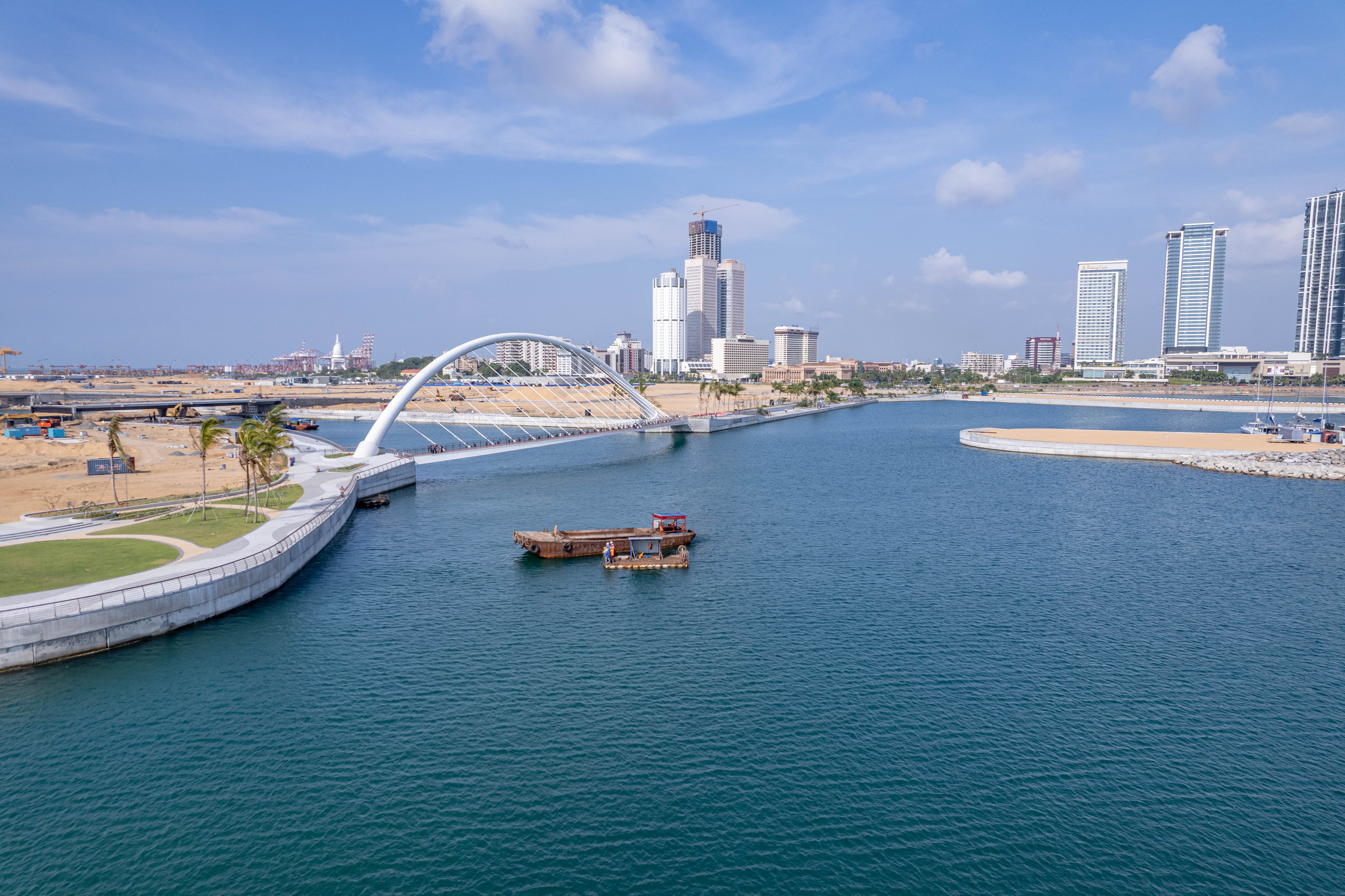
Pedestrian Bridge at Port City Colombo

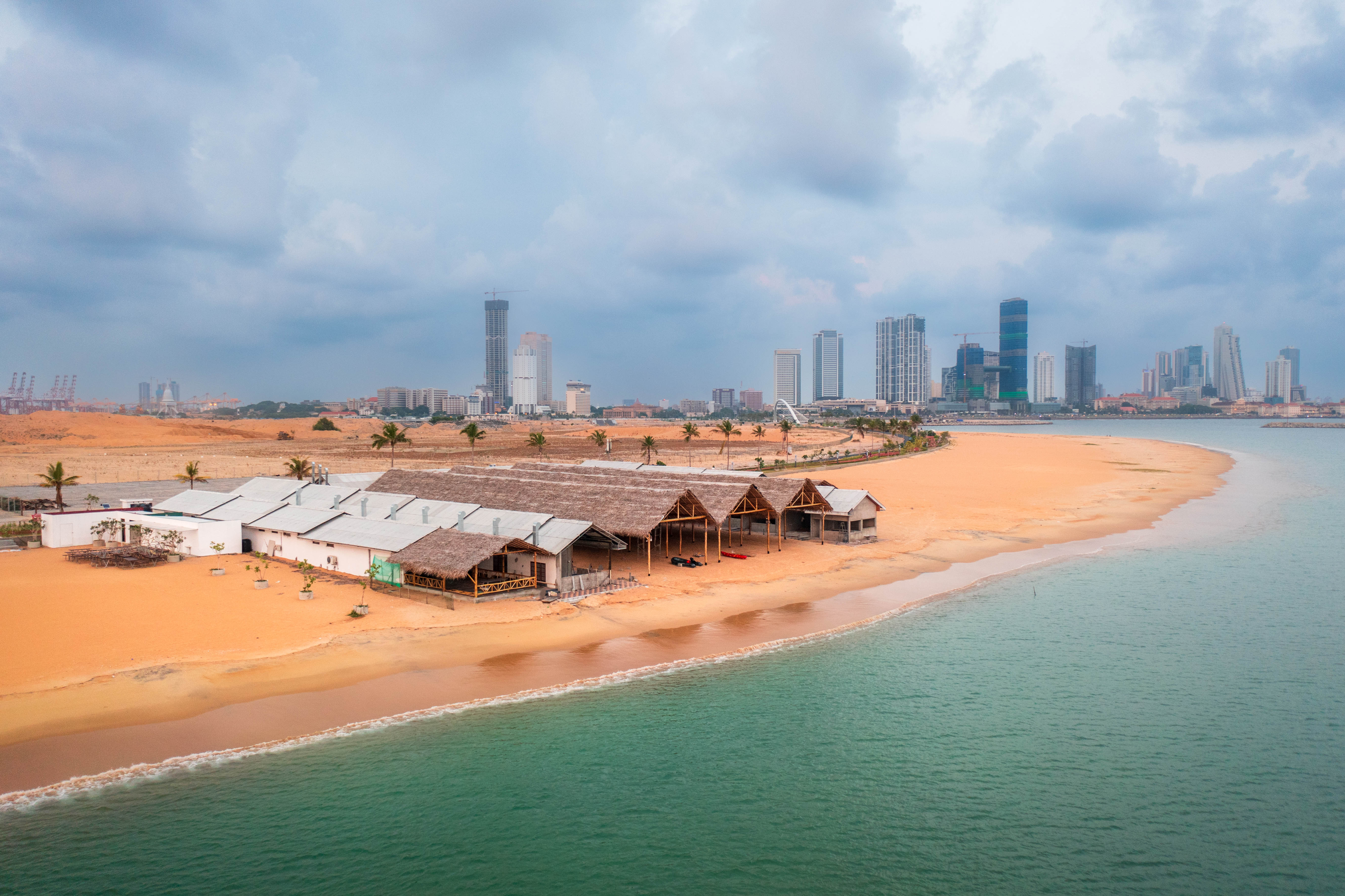
Port City Colombo Beach

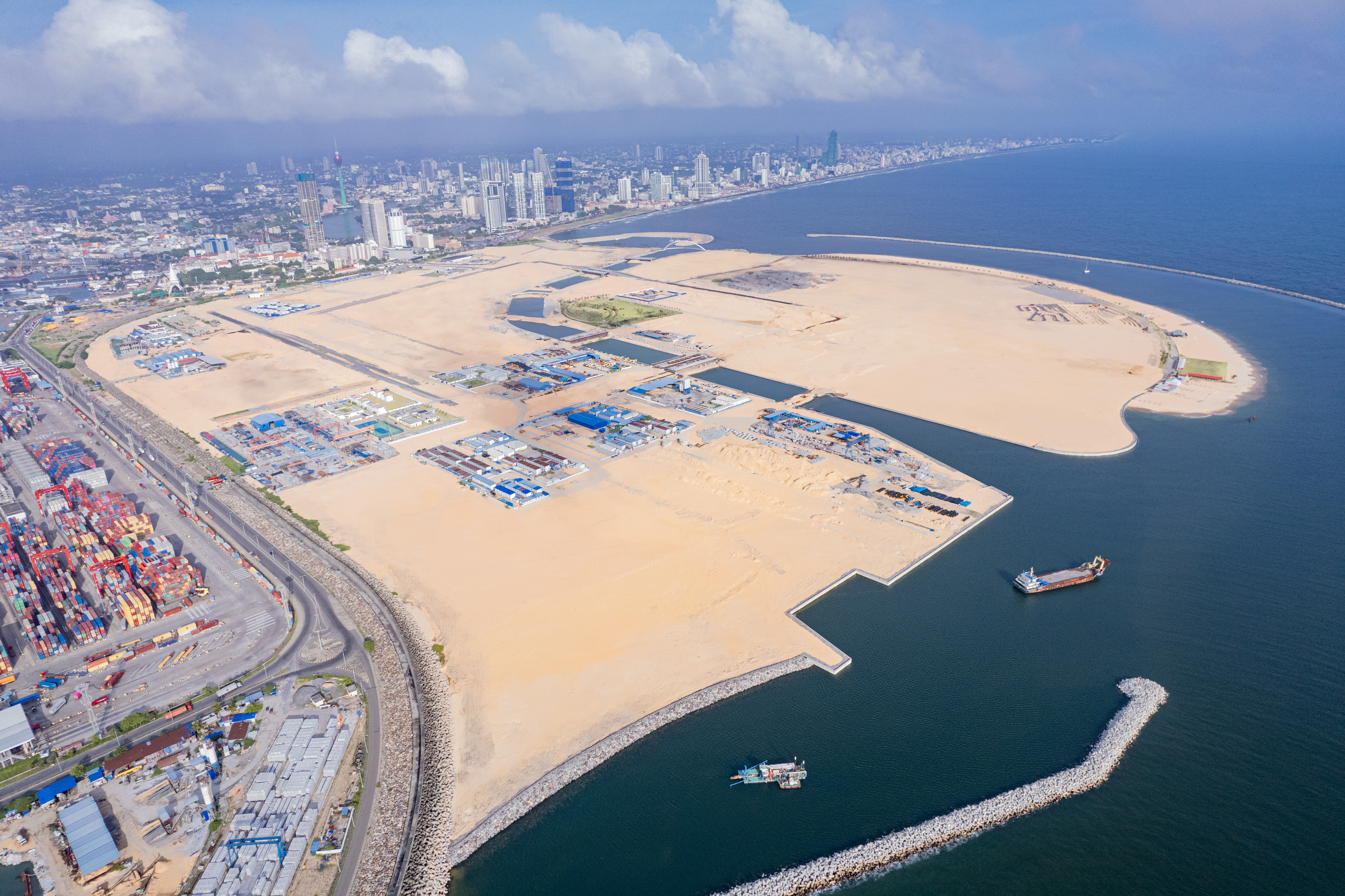
Port City Colombo - Progress Update

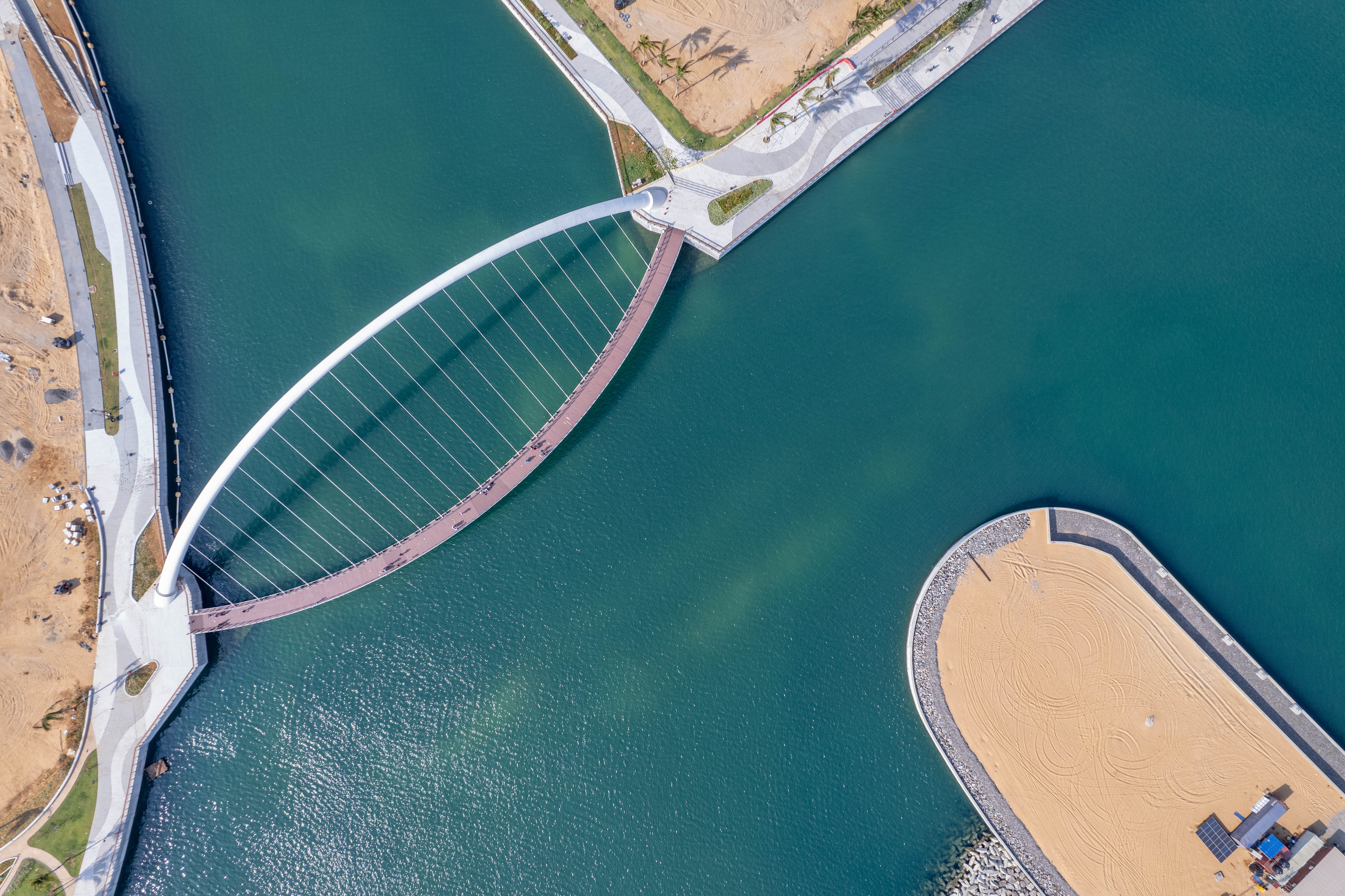
Port City Colombo view
