= Cey Laya =

Mixed-use twin towers in Colombo, Sri Lanka

CEY LAYA

General information
- Status: Proposed
- Type: Mixed-use
- Location: Colombo Port City, Colombo, Sri Lanka
- Cost: US$595.69 million (revised)

Technical details
- Floor count: 55

Design and construction
- Developer: Clothespin Management and Development (Private) Limited

Website
- ceylayatower.com

Cey Laya, stylized as CEY LAYA, is a proposed mixed-use twin-tower development located within the Colombo Port City Special Economic Zone in Colombo, Sri Lanka. It is developed by Clothespin Management and Development (Private) Limited.

== Overview ==
Cey Laya is conceived as an integrated destination combining residential, hospitality, commercial, retail and leisure uses. According to the developer, the project is intended to contribute to the growth of Colombo Port City as an international business and lifestyle destination.

The development is planned to include:

- Luxury residences
- Hotel
- Premium office spaces
- Retail and dining offerings
- Public viewing deck
- Two helipads
- Integrated lifestyle amenities

== History and development ==
The project was initially announced as a mixed-use development within Colombo Port City. In 2025, the developer announced that the project had been repositioned to a new land parcel within Port City following discussions with CHEC Port City Colombo (Pvt) Ltd, the primary developer of the Port City, citing improved Development Control Regulations (DCR) flexibility, constructability and financial viability.

The revised investment value for the project was reported as US$595.69 million, up from earlier estimates. To support continued development, the company announced a private placement of up to €300 million in credit-linked notes (CLN). The project is led by Priyath Bandu Wickrama, Chief Executive Officer of Clothespin Management and Development (Private) Limited.

== Location ==
Cey Laya is located on a waterfront site within Colombo Port City, a 269-hectare reclaimed land development adjacent to the existing Colombo central business district and Galle Face. The Port City is operated as a special economic zone under the Colombo Port City Economic Commission.

== See also ==
- Colombo Port City
- List of tallest buildings in Sri Lanka
