= Central Park Boulevard =

Twin-tower residential and lifestyle development in Colombo, Sri Lanka

General information
- Status: Under construction
- Type: Residential - luxury high-rise
- Architectural style: Modern resort-style
- Location: Plot 1-01-01, Central Park District, Colombo Port City, Colombo, Sri Lanka
- Cost: US$300 million (estimated total value)

Technical details
- Floor count: 37

Design and construction
- Architects: SOG Architects and PWA Architects
- Developer: Home Lands Group

Website
- homelandsportcity.com

Central Park Boulevard, also known as Central Park Boulevard at Port City Colombo by Home Lands, is an under-construction luxury residential twin-tower development located in the Central Park District of Colombo Port City in Colombo, Sri Lanka. It is developed by Home Lands Group, one of Sri Lanka's largest real estate developers.

== Overview ==
Central Park Boulevard is situated on Plot 1-01-01 within the Central Park District, overlooking approximately 40 acres of landscaped Central Park green space, canals and waterways, with views of the Indian Ocean and Colombo coastline. The development is designed as a resort-style residential community that integrates urban living with parkland surroundings.

The project comprises two towers rising 37 levels and containing over 640 residential units. The residential mix includes one-bedroom, two-bedroom and three-bedroom apartments, as well as sky villas, penthouses and exclusive Emerald Mansions. The development includes over 50 amenities designed to international standards. The architectural design was undertaken by SOG Architects of Singapore in collaboration with PWA Architects of Sri Lanka.

== History ==
Central Park Boulevard was officially launched in June 2026 at an event held in Colombo. The launch event was attended by Indian film actors Shilpa Shetty, Jacqueline Fernandez and Aditya Roy Kapur, and former Sri Lankan cricketer Mahela Jayawardene, who was announced as a brand ambassador for Home Lands. The developer stated that it was the first Sri Lankan high-rise residential project inspired by an ultra-luxury international lifestyle brand.

According to the developer, 50 percent of the units were sold prior to the official launch. The project represents an investment of US$150 million by Home Lands, described as the largest real estate investment made by a single Sri Lankan developer, with a total estimated project value exceeding US$300 million.

== Construction ==
Construction is progressing in phases. Piling work for the development involved the construction of 192 piles using nine piling machines deployed by three contractors, Access Engineering PLC, San Piling (Pvt) Ltd. and D P Jayasinghe Piling Company (Pvt) Ltd. In September 2026, the project had reached 60 percent piling completion. On 15 October 2026, Home Lands announced that 100 percent of piling had been completed within 88 days, ahead of schedule. Following completion of piling, construction moved into the superstructure phase, with delivery anticipated within 36 months.

== Location ==
The development is located within the Central Park Living precinct of Colombo Port City, a 269-hectare reclaimed land development classified as a Special Economic Zone and governed by the Colombo Port City Economic Commission. The Central Park District is characterized as a medium-high density residential area with access to parkland, courtyard and sports facilities.

== See also ==
- Colombo Port City
