= Asian Institute of International Financial Law =

Hong Kong think tank

- AIIFL Logo
- Abbreviation: AIIFL
- Formation: 1999
- Founders: Professor Joseph J. Norton; Professor Say Goo; Professor Douglas W. Arner
- Type: Think Tank
- Headquarters: Faculty of Law, The University of Hong Kong; 10/F Cheng Yu Tung Tower, Centennial Campus, Pokfulam Road, Hong Kong
- Location: Hong Kong
- Director: Professor Douglas W. Arner
- Website: AIIFL

Asian Institute of International Financial Law (AIIFL) is a Think-Tank attached to the Faculty of Law, University of Hong Kong.

Founded in 1999, AIIFL has played a leading role in HKU’s development as a global leader in FinTech and RegTech in research and teaching.

== History ==
During his tenure at HKU, Professor Joseph J. Norton, along with Professor Say Goo, Professor Douglas W. Arner and other colleagues working in the area of commercial, corporate and financial law, led the establishment of AIIFL at the Faculty of Law in July 1999.

AIIFL was established to assist the Faculty of Law in developing a partnership with other units at HKU and with the local business and financial communities for establishing a leading Asian academic centre in the area of international commercial, corporate and financial law.

== HKU FinTech ==
AIIFL’s key initiatives include 'Introduction To FinTech', a Massive Open Online Course (MOOC) with edX, spread across every country in the world. The 'Introduction To FinTech' is recognised by the Global Academy of Finance and Management (GAFM), a US-based accredited global graduate society for management and finance with membership over 150 countries, for its certification, ‘Certified Fintech Professional’.
