= Colombo Port City Economic Commission Bill =

The bill titled as Colombo Port City Economic Commission Bill is regarded as one of the important legislations to be passed in the Parliament of Sri Lanka as it is related to the Colombo Port City project, which is the biggest foreign investment received by Sri Lanka from China in the country's history. The bill was slated and deemed as controversial as critics feared that China could influence Sri Lankan territory through the Port City project.

However, critics pointed out that the bill has been mandated on the favour of Chinese authorities and insisted that the bill was also not subjected to pre-parliamentary review by the professional organisations. The draft bill was reportedly prepared by the Chinese Harbour Company Ltd.

The bill which contains 76 pages provides legal framework to set up Special Economic Zone within the Colombo Port City and the bill also provides for the establishment of a Colombo Port City Economic Commission empowered to grant registrations, authorisations and licenses in the Special Economic Zone.

Despite the odds, the bill also marks historic importance as it is set to bring influx of foreign direct investment to Sri Lanka. The bill was passed successfully in the Sri Lankan parliament on 20 May 2021 with few amendments to the bill as recommended by the Supreme Court of Sri Lanka. The third reading of the bill was passed with a majority of votes (149 votes) supporting in favour of the bill.

The Government of Sri Lanka was also criticised for passing the bill during the critical time of the COVID-19 pandemic in Sri Lanka.

== Timeline ==
On 19 April 2021, the Supreme Court handled the special petitions filed by UNP, JVP and the representatives of civil organisations against the draft bill. The petitioners urged the Supreme Court that if the bill is to be presented in the parliament it should necessarily require two-thirds majority in the parliament as well as in the referendum.

== Reactions ==
The opposition party Samagi Jana Balawegaya and United National Party had revealed that they would always welcome and support the Port City Project but their intention is to vehemently oppose the Colombo Port City Economic Commission Bill from becoming the law of the country. Sajith Premadasa, the opposition leader and leader of SJB party denounced the passing of the bill stating that the "sovereignty of Sri Lanka cannot be compromised by the external forces".

International media such as BBC alleged that China is using COVID-19 as an opportunity to influence power in neighbouring countries like Sri Lanka.
