= Douglas W. Arner =

Hong Kong academic

Professor Douglas W. Arner
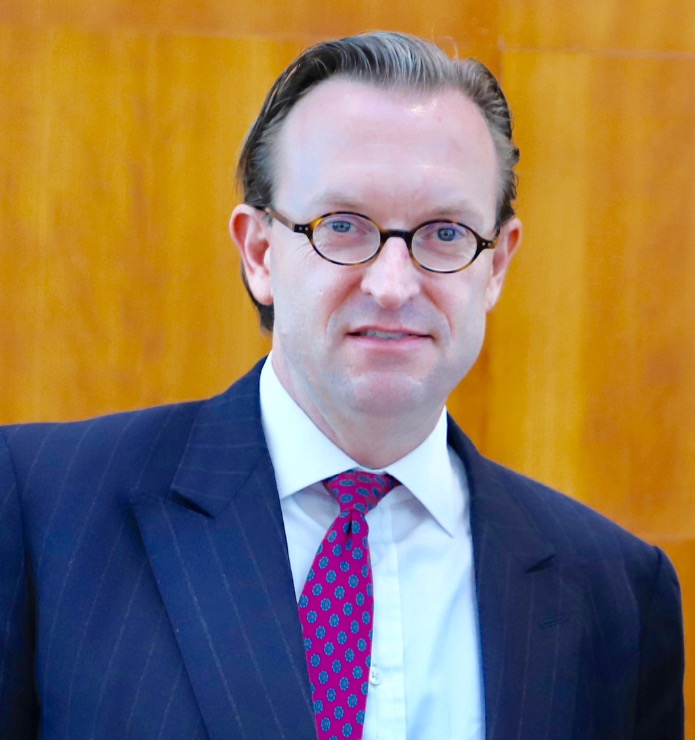
- Professor Douglas W. Arner
- Education: Drury College (BA covering literature, economics and political science); Southern Methodist University (JD (cum laude)); University of London (Queen Mary College) (LLM (with distinction) in banking and finance law); University of London (PhD)
- Occupation(s): Kerry Holdings Professor in Law, University of Hong Kong Director/Co-founder, Asian Institute of International Financial Law

Douglas W. Arner is a Kerry Holdings Professor at the University of Hong Kong (HKU).

He is a Senior Fellow of Melbourne Law School, University of Melbourne, and a Non-Executive Director of Aptorum Group [NASDAQ: APM].

He led the development of the world’s largest massive open online course (MOOC): Introduction to FinTech, launched on edX in May 2018, now spanning every country in the world, as part of the first online Professional Certificate in FinTech.

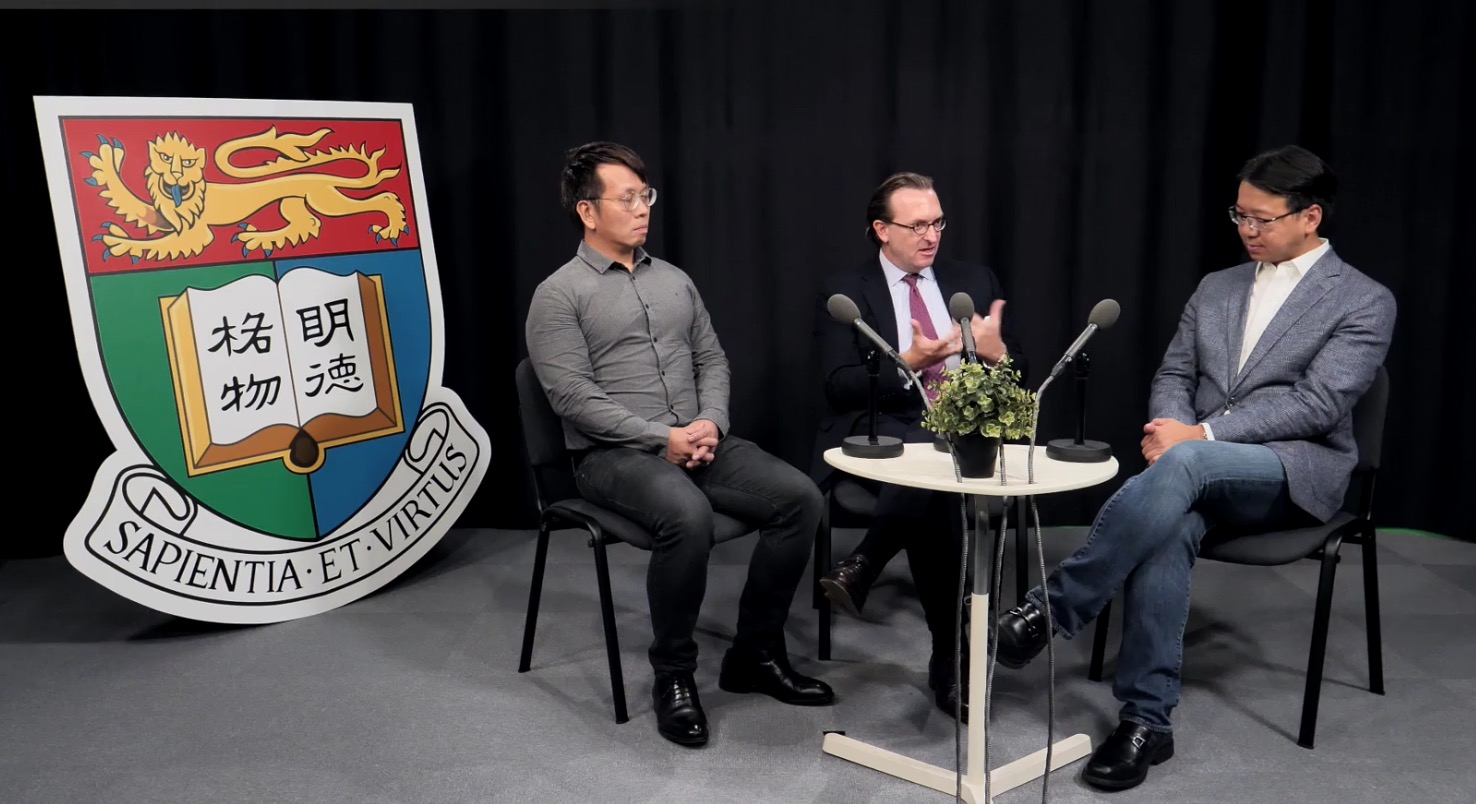
Douglas interviews Member of the Hong Kong Legislative Council Charles Mok (right) on FinTech.

== Education ==
He holds a BA from Drury College (where he studied literature, economics and political science), a JD (cum laude) from Southern Methodist University, an LLM (with distinction) in banking and finance law from the University of London (Queen Mary College), and a PhD from the University of London.

== Career ==
Arner was the Sir John Lubbock Support Fund Fellow at the Centre for Commercial Law Studies, Queen Mary College, University of London.

Arner joined at HKU in 2000 and was the Director of the Faculty’s Asian Institute of International Financial Law(AIIFL) from 2006 to 2011; he co-founded AIIFL in 1999 along with the LLM in Corporate and Financial Law.

Arner has been a visiting professor or fellow at Duke University, Harvard University, the Hong Kong Institute for Monetary Research, IDC Herzliya, McGill University, Melbourne University, National University of Singapore, Queen Mary University of London, University of New South Wales, Shanghai University of Finance and Economics, and Zurich University.

== Awards ==
In 2007, he received HKU’s Outstanding Young Researcher Award.

== Bibliography ==
Arner specialises in economic and financial law, regulation and development. He is author, co-author or editor of fifteen books, and author or co-author of more than 150 articles, chapters and reports on related subjects.

=== Selected works ===
- Arner, Douglas W.; Barberis, Jànos; Buckley, Ross P. (2015), The Evolution of Fintech: a New Post-crisis Paradigm?, University of New South Wales, hdl:10722/221450, OCLC 967780828
- Arner, Douglas W.; Barberis, Janos; Buckley, Ross P. (2017). "FinTech, RegTech, and the reconceptualization of financial regulation". scholar.google.com.
- Arner, Douglas W. (2007), Financial Stability, Economic Growth, and the Role of Law, Cambridge University Press, ISBN 9780521870474
