= Hong Kong 47 =

Group of pro-democracy advocates

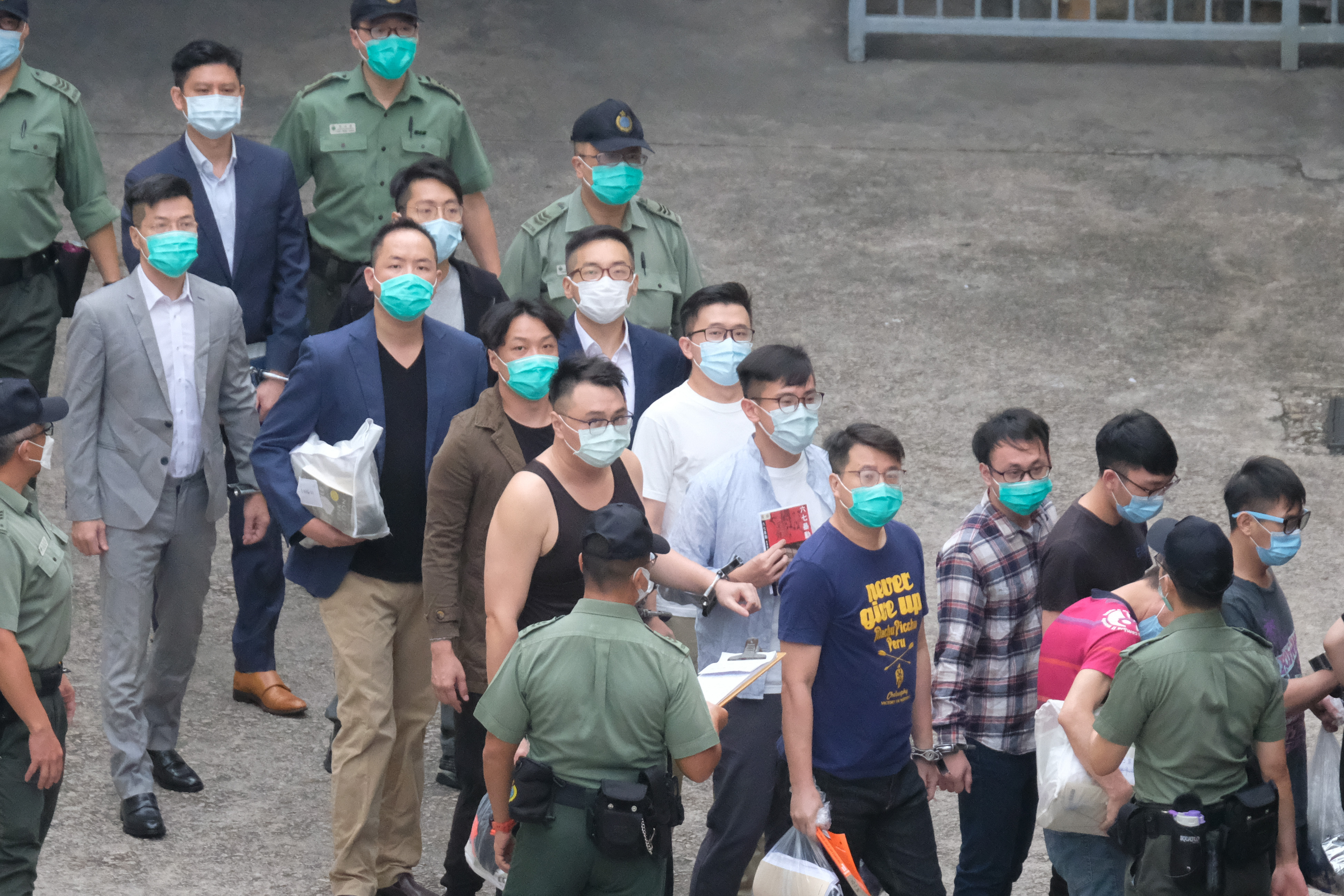
- Jailed activists of the Hong Kong 47 being brought to court
- Native name: 香港民主派初選案
- Date: 6 January 2021 – 19 November 2024
- Location: Hong Kong
- Target: Participants of 2020 Hong Kong pro-democracy primaries
- Arrests: 55
- Suspects: 47
- Charges: Conspiracy to commit subversion under the Hong Kong national security law
- Trial: HCCC69/2022; HCCC70/2022
- Verdict: 45 jailed (31 pleaded guilty, 14 found guilty); 2 acquitted
- Sentence: Imprisonment of 4 years 2 months to 10 years

HKSAR v. NG GORDON CHING HANG AND OTHERS HKSAR v. TAI YIU TING AND OTHERS
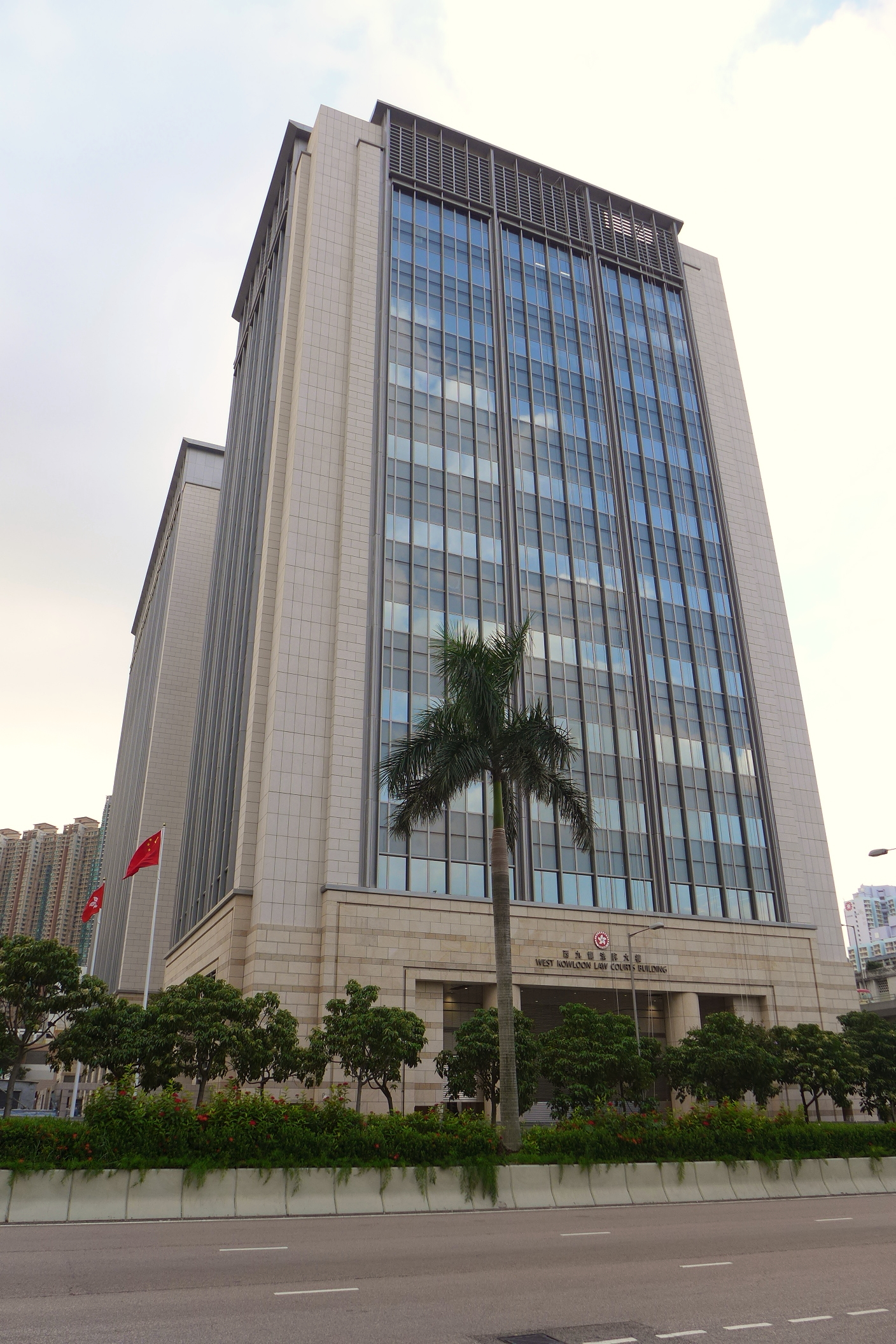
- Hong Kong Judiciary
- Court: High Court of Hong Kong
- Decided: 19 November 2024
- Verdict: 4 years and 2 months to 10 years imprisonment
- Charge: Conspiracy of subversive activities
- Citations: HCCC69/2022; HCCC70/2022
- Transcripts: Judgement transcript Media summary

Court membership
- Judges sitting: Andrew Chan; Alex Lee; Johnny Chan

Laws applied
- HKNSL; Crimes Ordinance

The Hong Kong 47 is a group of 47 pro-democracy advocates in Hong Kong charged with conspiracy to commit subversion under the Hong Kong national security law.

On 6 January 2021, 53 activists, former legislators, social workers and academics were arrested by the National Security Department of the Hong Kong Police Force under the national security law over their organisation and participation in the primaries for the subsequently postponed Legislative Council election, including six organisers and 48 participants, of which two were arrested in jail, making it the largest crackdown under the national security law since its passage on 30 June 2020. Authorities also raided 72 sites including the home of jailed activist Joshua Wong, the offices of news outlets Apple Daily, Stand News and Hong Kong Inmedia; and polling institute Hong Kong Public Opinion Research Institute (PORI), and froze more than $200,000 in funds related to the primaries. The arrests reduced the pro-democracy camp, including its moderate wing, considerably, and targeted several prominent figures.

On 28 February 2021, 47 opposition figures among those arrested in January were officially charged with conspiracy to commit subversion under the national security law. Their appearance in court on 1 March saw hundreds of protesters assembling outside the building.

Several defence lawyers expressed their objections in court to the slow prosecutions, which contrasted with speedily pressed charges. Analysts considered the slow trial, which extended to other national security cases, to be a deliberate strategy designed to stoke fear. The case was adjourned several times; at the adjournment on 4 March 2022, the next hearing date was set as 28 April, due to the COVID-19 pandemic, at which date the defendants were told to appear again on 1 to 2 June; a higher court judge had called on the handling lower court a few days earlier to deliver a speedy trial. The defendants were subjected at times to solitary confinement.

The trial lasted from 6 February to 4 December 2023. Two were acquitted by the panel of judges in May 2024, while the remaining 14 were found guilty. Along with 31 defendants who had entered a plea deal, the sentences of the 45 ranged from 4 years and 2 months to 10 years in prison. Benny Tai, whom the court described as the "mastermind" for initiating the plan, was handed the longest jail term. As of 25 September 2026, 22 of the sentenced have been released.

== Background ==
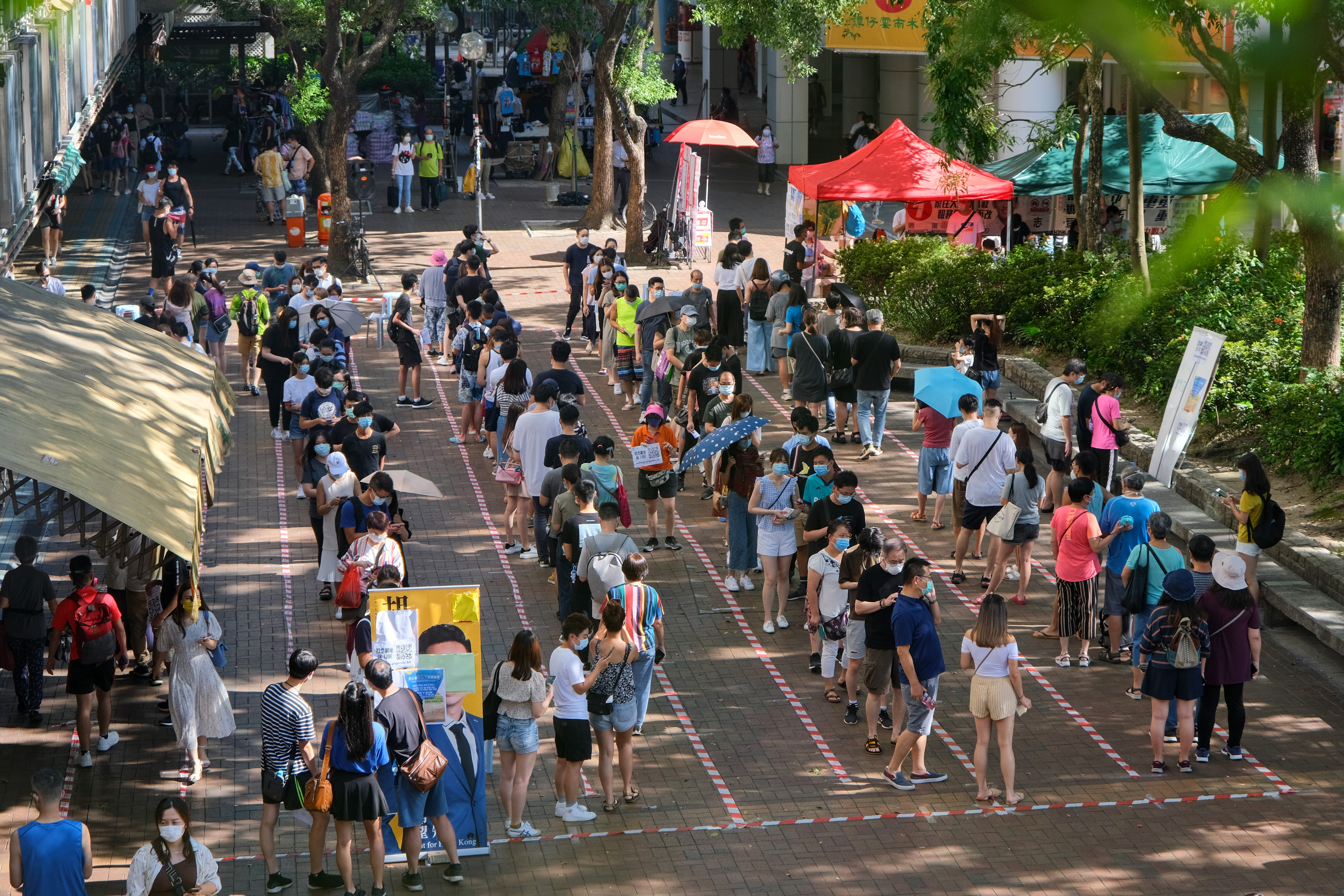
Long queue outside polling station at Tai Po Plaza on 12 July 2020

On 11 and 12 July 2020, the pro-democracy camp, organised by legal scholar and activist Benny Tai, held a primary to select numbers of candidates for the September Legislative Council election to maximise the chance for the pro-democrats to achieve the "35+" majority in the Legislative Council to block the government's bills and pressured the government to implement the five key demands of the ongoing protests. Tai envisaged that the democrats would veto all bills in the legislature to paralyse the government, and would force the Chief Executive to dissolve the Legislative Council after the government budget was vetoed, as on the fourth and fifth stages of the "ten-step lam chau" timeline. The resignation of the Chief Executive would be forced by Article 52 of the Basic Law if the Legislative Council resulting from a by-election still did not approve the budget.

Before the primaries were held, Secretary for Constitutional and Mainland Affairs Erick Tsang warned that they might violate the new Beijing-imposed national security law, specifically its clauses prohibiting secession, subversion and collusion with foreign powers. Benny Tai refuted the claim by saying such advocacy work was in accordance with the principles of the Basic Law. He added that vetoing the budget would not constitute "seriously interfering in, disrupting, or undermining the performance of duties and functions" of the government under Article 22 of the new law because the chief executive has the power to dismiss the legislature and call a by-election.

Despite the national security law and legal threats, over 600,000 voters, including 590,000 electronic ballots and more than 20,000 paper ballots, turned out throughout the two-day vote, more than 13 per cent of the total number of registered voters and far exceeding the organisers' expected turnout of 170,000. Chief Executive Carrie Lam issued a strong warning to the candidates and organisers of the primaries, saying it was subversive for them to vow to seize control of the legislature and vote down key government proposals. "If this so-called primary election's purpose is to achieve the ultimate goal of delivering what they called '35+' [lawmakers], with the objective of objecting or resisting every policy initiative of the HKSAR government, it may fall into the category of subverting the state power – one of the four types of offences under the national security law," she said.

A spokesman for Beijing's Liaison Office in Hong Kong condemned the opposition camp for ignoring the Hong Kong government's warning of possible legal breaches and pressing ahead with the primary. It named Benny Tai as a suspect in a possible breach of the national security law by coordinating with the opposition camp to seek control of the legislature, vote down the budget, paralyse the government and subvert the state power. It also accused Tai and the opposition of aiming to take over the city's governance by staging the Hong Kong version of a "colour revolution". The Hong Kong and Macau Affairs Office (HKMAO) accused Tai of "illegally manipulating" Hong Kong's electoral system, challenging the new national security law and acting as a political agent for foreign forces.

== Arrests ==
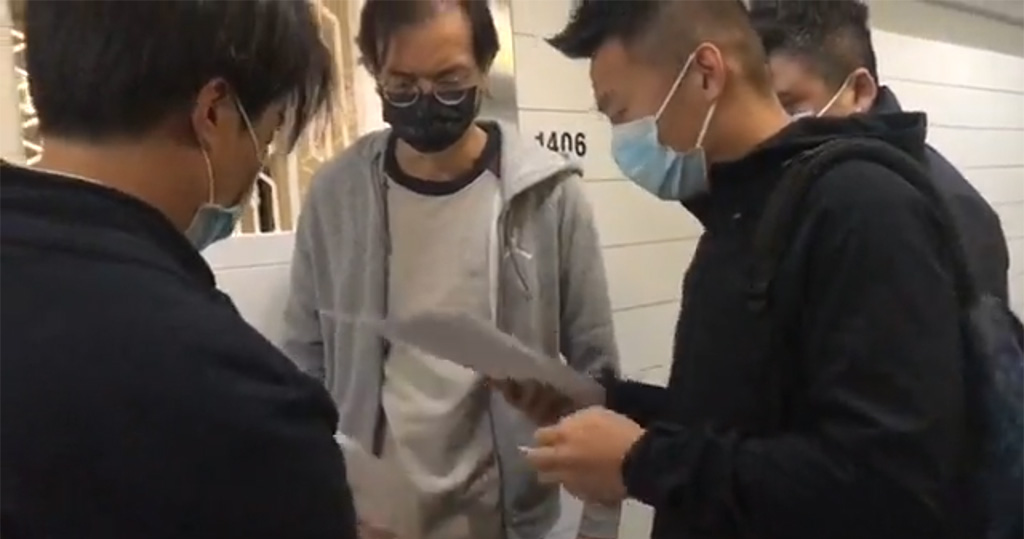
National Security Department police officers showing documents to Stand News editor-in-chief Chung Pui-kuen on 6 January

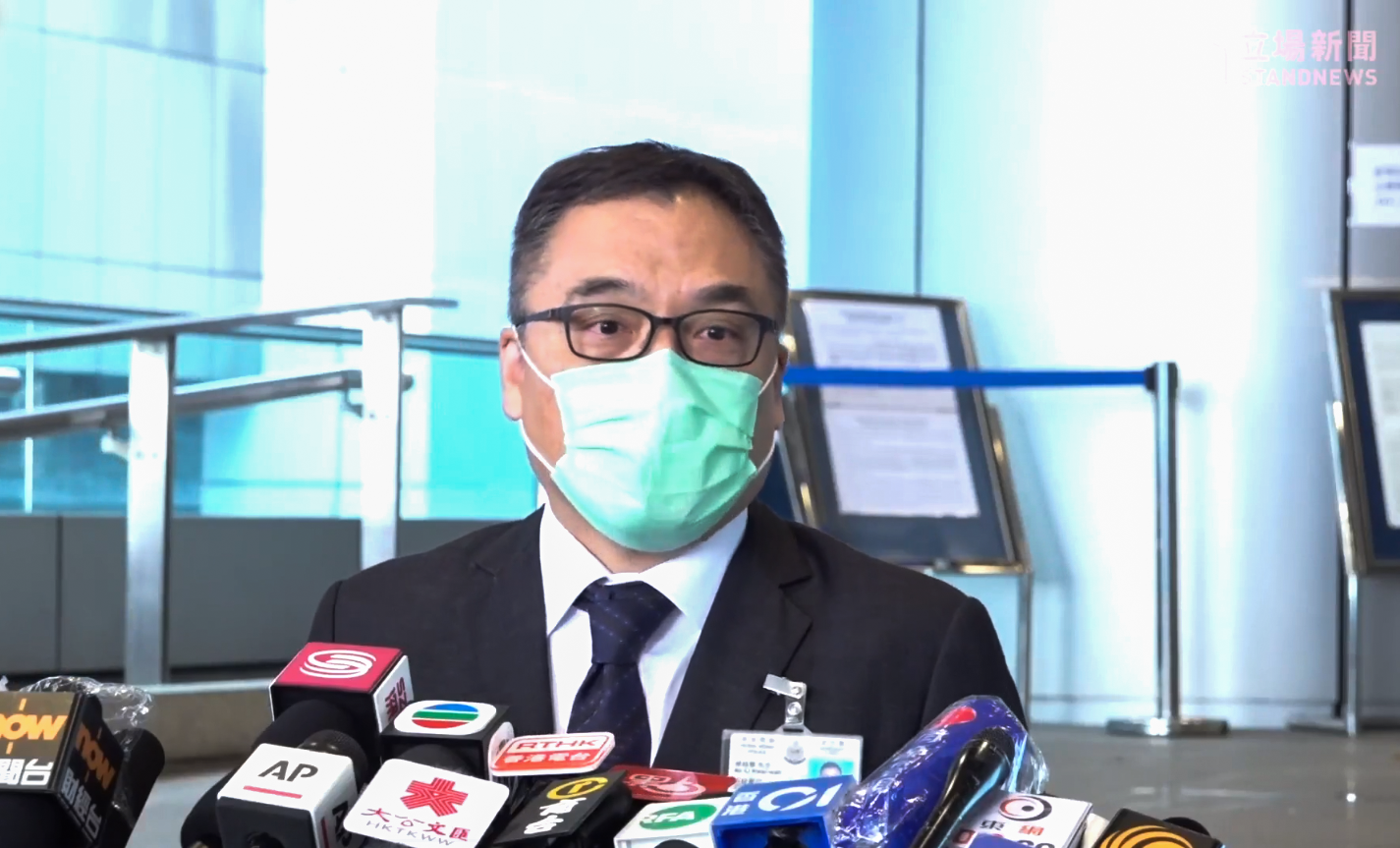
Senior Superintendent Steve Li Kwai-wah during a press briefing after the arrests at noon

In the morning on 6 January 2021, the National Security Department of the Hong Kong Police Force raided 72 places, including the home of jailed activist Joshua Wong, as well as co-organisers Hong Kong Public Opinion Research Institute (PORI) and law firm Ho Tse Wai and Partners. It further demanded three news outlets Apple Daily, Stand News and InMedia HK to hand over information, and froze HK$206,000 in funds related to the election. In the operations, the police arrested 55 men and women (Note: Joshua Wong and Tam Tak-chi were arrested in jail.) including activists, former legislators, social workers and academics who organised or contested in the primaries across the pro-democracy spectrum on suspicion of "subversion of state power" under the national security law.

They included organiser Benny Tai and jailed activist and primary candidate Joshua Wong, seven former legislators of the Democratic Party, the Hong Kong's largest opposition party including the party chairman Wu Chi-wai, veteran politicians and activists Leung Kwok-hung and Claudia Mo, and newcomers including Jeffrey Andrews, a social worker serving the city's ethnic minority community, and disability rights advocate Lee Chi-yung. American lawyer John Clancey, partner of Ho Tse Wai and Partners and treasurer of the Power for Democracy which co-ordinated the primaries, was also arrested. PORI executive director Robert Chung and his deputy Chung Kim-wah were also visited by police and asked to assist with the investigation.

On the afternoon after the arrests, Steve Li Kwai-wah, Senior Superintendent of the police national security unit, met with reporters. During the briefing, he showed a timetable showing that the proposal to use strategic voting to win a majority in the Legislative Council had first emerged in March 2020, with crowdfunding, public opinion research, publicity, and holding forums to follow until June. The primary elections were held on 11 and 12 July. Without referring to Benny Tai by name, he said that the proposer of the plan had been "very determined and resourceful". He stated that such aims as in the plan amounted to subversion.

According to Secretary for Security John Lee, the arrestees were accused of "subverting state power" for holding the primaries and were suspected of attempting to gain a majority in the Legislative Council with the goal of paralysing the government. Lee also said that the primary election was organized and planned as an evidence for the "vicious plan" to "sink Hong Kong into an abyss."

All arrestees are listed as the following. All were released on bail on 7 January, except Wu Chi-wai, who was alleged to have violated bail conditions related to a separate case of unauthorized assembly. On 28 February, 47 of those were arrested again, later charged.

== List of arrestees ==
The 47 defendants charged with conspiracy to commit subversion under the national security law are:

List of 55 arrestees
Role	Portrait	Name	Arrest age	Offices held	Status
Organiser		Benny Tai Yiu-ting	56	Associate Law Professor of University of Hong Kong Faculty of Law (2001–2020)	Pleaded guilty
Organiser		Au Nok-hin	33	Member of Legislative Council (2018–2020)	Pleaded guilty
Organiser		Andrew Chiu Ka-yin	35	Vice chairman of Eastern District Council; Convenor of Power for Democracy	Pleaded guilty
Organiser		Ben Chung Kam-lun	32	Chairman of Sai Kung District Council; Deputy convenor of Power for Democracy	Pleaded guilty
Organiser		John Clancey	79	Treasurer of Power for Democracy	Not charged
Organiser		Gordon Ng Ching-hang	42	Activist	Found guilty
Candidates (Hong Kong Island)		Tiffany Yuen Ka-wai	27	Member of Southern District Council	Pleaded guilty
Candidates (Hong Kong Island)		Fergus Leung Fong-wai	23	Member of Central and Western District Council	Pleaded guilty
Candidates (Hong Kong Island)		Tat Cheng Tat-hung	32	Member of Eastern District Council	Found guilty
Candidates (Hong Kong Island)		Andy Chui Chi-kin	53–54	Member of Eastern District Council	Pleaded guilty
Candidates (Hong Kong Island)		Clarisse Yeung Suet-ying	34	Chairman of Wan Chai District Council	Found guilty
Candidates (Hong Kong Island)		Michael Pang Cheuk-kei	26	Member of Southern District Council	Found guilty
Candidates (Kowloon West)		Jimmy Sham Tsz-kit	33	Member of Sha Tin District Council; Convenor of Civil Human Rights Front (2015–2016; 2018–2020)	Pleaded guilty
Candidates (Kowloon West)		Claudia Mo Man-ching	64	Member of Legislative Council (2012–2020)	Pleaded guilty
Candidates (Kowloon West)		Kalvin Ho Kai-ming	32	Member of Sham Shui Po District Council; Vice Chairman of Hong Kong Association for Democracy and People's Livelihood	Found guilty
Candidates (Kowloon West)		Frankie Fung Tat-chun	25	Convenor of Peninsular Commons	Pleaded guilty
Candidates (Kowloon West)		Lawrence Lau Wai-chung	53	Member of Sham Shui Po District Council; Barrister and former magistrate	Acquitted
Candidates (Kowloon West)		Helena Wong Pik-wan	61	Member of Legislative Council (2012–2020)	Found guilty
Candidates (Kowloon West)		Nathan Lau Chak-fung	24	Activist	Pleaded guilty
Candidates (Kowloon West)		Alterin Jeffrey Andrews	34–35	Social worker	Not charged
Candidates (Kowloon East)		Joshua Wong Chi-fung	24	Secretary general of Demosistō (2016–2020)	Pleaded guilty
Candidates (Kowloon East)		Jeremy Jansen Tam Man-ho	45	Member of Legislative Council (2016–2020)	Pleaded guilty
Candidates (Kowloon East)		Kinda Li Ka-tat	29–30	Member of Kwun Tong District Council	Pleaded guilty
Candidates (Kowloon East)		Tam Tak-chi	48	Vice chairman of People Power	Pleaded guilty
Candidates (Kowloon East)		Wu Chi-wai	58	Member of Legislative Council (2012–2020); Chairman of Democratic Party (2016–2020)	Pleaded guilty
Candidates (Kowloon East)		Sze Tak-loy	38	Member of Wong Tai Sin District Council; Chairman of Hong Kong Association for Democracy and People's Livelihood	Found guilty
Candidates (New Territories West)		Eddie Chu Hoi-dick	43	Member of Legislative Council (2016–2020)	Pleaded guilty
Candidates (New Territories West)		Sam Cheung Ho-sum	27	Member of Tuen Mun District Council	Pleaded guilty
Candidates (New Territories West)		Prince Wong Ji-yuet	23	Spokesperson of Scholarism (2015–2016)	Pleaded guilty
Candidates (New Territories West)		Ng Kin-wai	25	Member of Yuen Long District Council	Pleaded guilty
Candidates (New Territories West)		Andrew Wan Siu-kin	51	Member of Legislative Council (2016–2020); Member of Kwai Tsing District Council	Pleaded guilty
Candidates (New Territories West)		Kwok Ka-ki	59	Member of Legislative Council (2004–2008; 2012–2020)	Pleaded guilty
Candidates (New Territories West)		Carol Ng Man-yee	50	Chairwoman of Hong Kong Confederation of Trade Unions	Pleaded guilty
Candidates (New Territories West)		Roy Tam Hoi-pong	40	Member of Tsuen Wan District Council	Pleaded guilty
Candidates (New Territories East)		Gwyneth Ho Kwai-lam	30	Former journalist for Stand News	Found guilty
Candidates (New Territories East)		Ventus Lau Wing-hong	27	Activist	Pleaded guilty
Candidates (New Territories East)		Alvin Yeung Ngok-kiu	39	Member of Legislative Council (2016–2020); Leader of the Civic Party (2016–2020)	Pleaded guilty
Candidates (New Territories East)		Raymond Chan Chi-chuen	48	Member of Legislative Council (2012–2020); Chairman of People Power	Found guilty
Candidates (New Territories East)		Owen Chow Ka-shing	24	Activist	Found guilty
Candidates (New Territories East)		Lam Cheuk-ting	43	Member of Legislative Council (2016–2020); Member of North District Council	Found guilty
Candidates (New Territories East)		Gary Fan Kwok-wai	54	Member of Legislative Council (2012–2016; 2018–2020); Member of Sai Kung District Council	Pleaded guilty
Candidates (New Territories East)		Hendrick Lui Chi-hang	37–38	Social worker	Pleaded guilty
Candidates (New Territories East)		Leung Kwok-hung	64	Member of Legislative Council (2004–2017)	Found guilty
Candidates (New Territories East)		Mike Lam King-nam	32	Founder of retail chain AbouThai	Pleaded guilty
Candidates (New Territories East)		Ricky Or Yiu-lam	49	Member of Sai Kung District Council	Found guilty
Candidates (New Territories East)		Lee Chi-yung	40–41	Spokesman for Association of Parents of the Severely Mentally Handicapped	Not charged
Candidates (District Council (Second))		Roy Kwong Chun-yu	38	Member of Legislative Council (2016–2020); Member of Yuen Long District Council	Not charged
Candidates (District Council (Second))		Lester Shum Ngo-fai	27	Member of Tsuen Wan District Council	Pleaded guilty
Candidates (District Council (Second))		Henry Wong Pak-yu	30	Member of Yuen Long District Council	Pleaded guilty
Candidates (District Council (Second))		James To Kun-sun	57	Member of Legislative Council (1998–2020); Member of Yau Tsim Mong District Council	Not charged
Candidates (District Council (Second))		Lee Yue-shun	27	Member of Eastern District Council	Acquitted
Candidates (Health Services)		Winnie Yu Wai-ming	33	Chairperson of Hospital Authority Employees Alliance	Found guilty
Candidates (Health Services)		Michael Felix Lau Hoi-man	36–37	Officer of Hong Kong Allied Health Professionals and Nurse Association	Not charged
Candidates (Health Services)		Joseph Lee Kok-long	61	Member of Legislative Council (2004–2020)	Not charged
Candidates (Health Services)		Yuen Wai-kit	42–43	Principal of the School of Nursing of the Union Hospital	Not charged

== Responses ==
=== Hong Kong ===
==== Hong Kong government ====
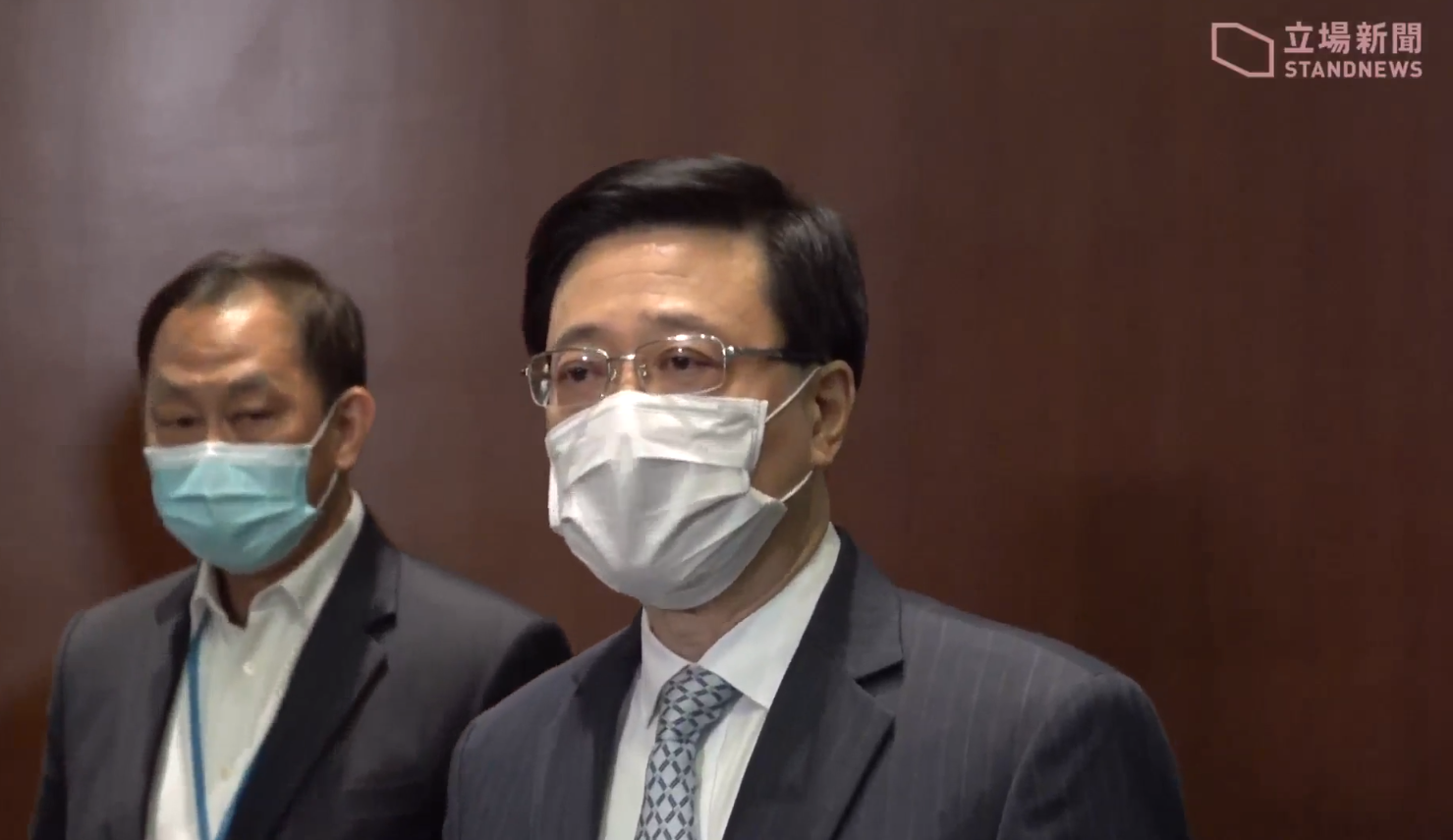
Secretary for Security John Lee speaking after the arrests

On the day of the arrests, Secretary for Security John Lee said at the Legislative Council that the ten-step lam chau timeline that Benny Tai, one of the arrestees, had proposed would "result in serious damage to society as a whole, that is why police action today is necessary."

The government issued a press release stating that the arrested persons are "active elements who organize, plan, implement, or participate in the subversion of the regime" with the intent to paralyze the government, severely interfere with, obstruct, and undermine the performance of its functions, and coerce the Chinese government and the SAR government.

Ronny Tong, a member of the Executive Council, said that for the time being, he did not see that the democrats violated the national security law in the primary elections. However, he also pointed out that members' veto of all government funding to prevent the government from functioning may be "seriously interfering with the performance of government agencies' duties," and that they may violate the law.

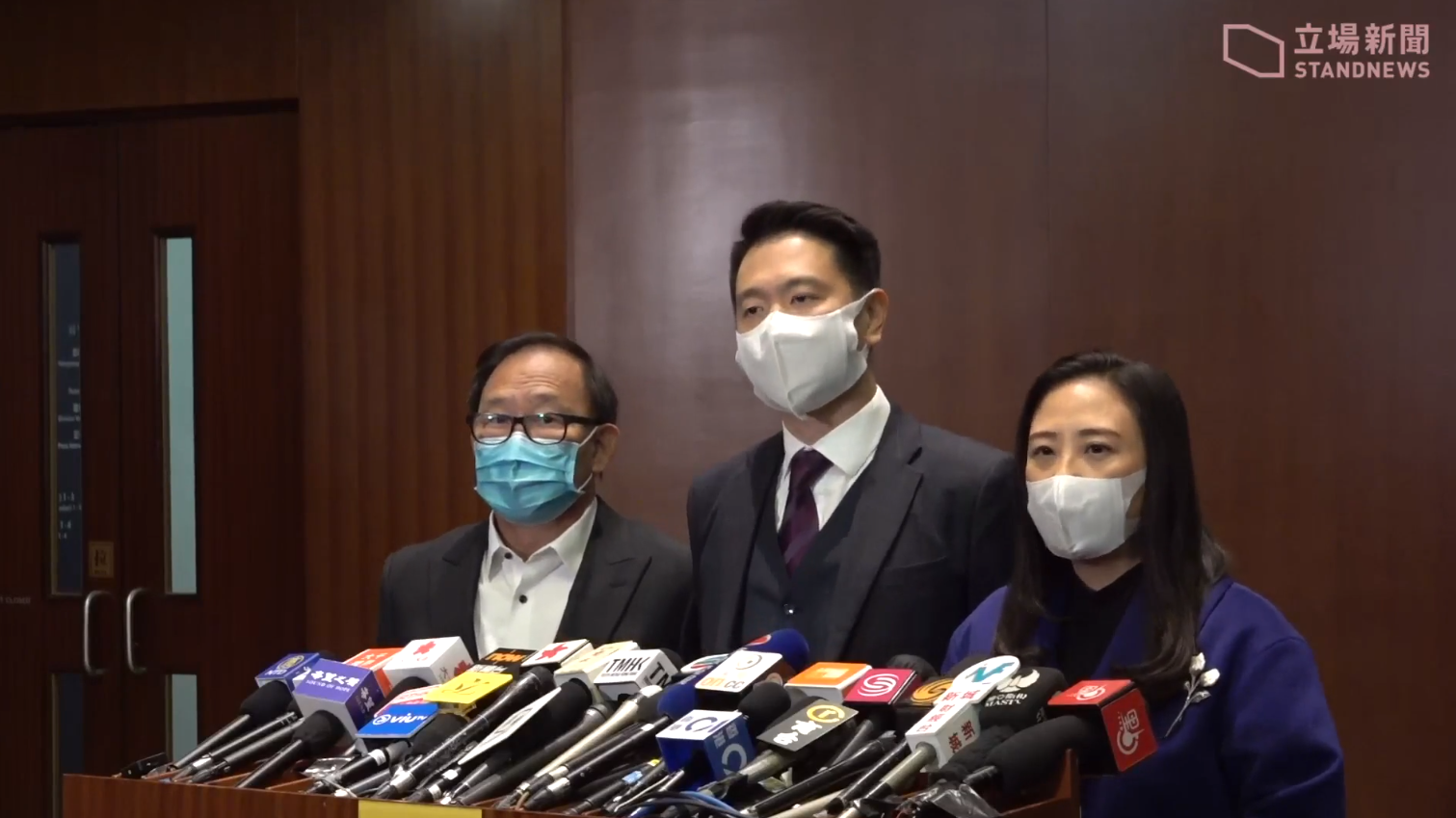
DAB lawmakers (from left to right) Leung Che-cheung, Holden Chow, and Elizabeth Quat respond to the arrests.

==== Pro-Beijing camp ====
Holden Chow, member of the Legislative Council for the largest pro-Beijing party, DAB, said in a tweet that those arrested had violated the national security law because they had a "clear aim to paralyze" the local government and were threatening to "remove the Chinese sovereignty over Hong Kong."

In an interview with the public broadcaster RTHK, Roundtable lawmaker Michael Tien said the authorities should explain what unlawful means were involved in the cases, saying that "on the surface", neither holding a primary election nor casting a vote was unlawful. He further said that he saw no way of how the arrestees could be convicted without the court interpreting the "ultimate motive as part of the [national security] bill", and opined that the national security law might need to be redrafted to more clearly reflect this interpretation.

==== Pro-democracy camp ====
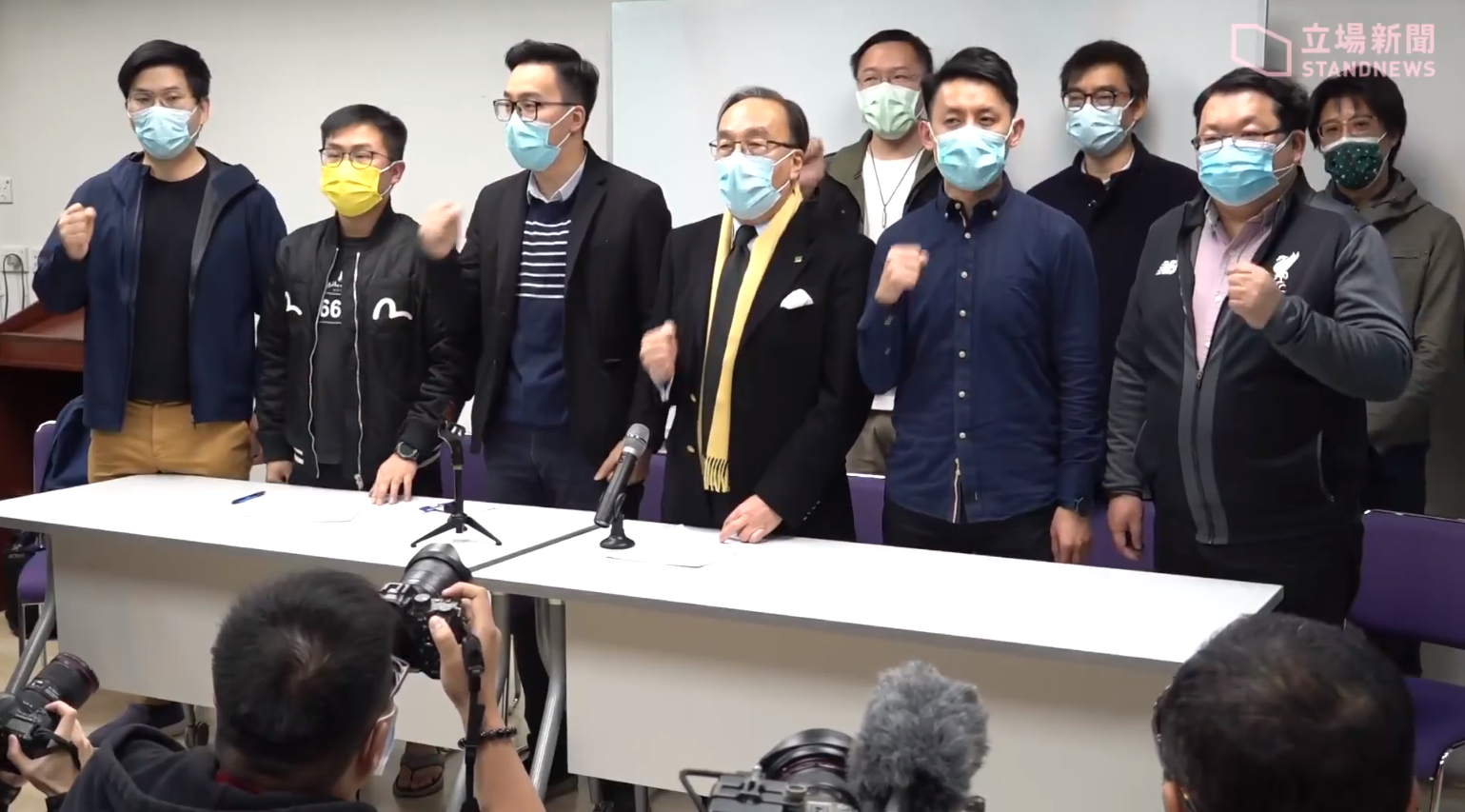
Pro-democracy camp responding to the arrests

Democratic Party chairman Lo Kin-hei sharply criticised the arrests at a news conference, suggesting that the national security law was poised to become a "universal key" for the government which would lead to "white terror", adding that this was "exactly what the Hong Kong government wants to create".

Civic Party chairman Alan Leong criticised the mass arrests as he could not see why those who promised to exercise their power to veto budgets – as outlined in the Basic Law – would be considered subversive. "We know that many in Hong Kong are very disappointed. But we appeal to the people of Hong Kong not to despair," Leong said. "We should insist on speaking the truth and living in truth. There will be light in the end of the dark tunnel, and every dark night will see the dawn. So, let us stand and fight."

Three candidates for the pro-democracy primaries in exile, Nathan Law, Ted Hui, and Sunny Cheung issued a statement in the evening of 6 January, describing the mass arrest as another proof that the one country, two systems principle was lost under the authority of the Chinese Communist Party, and saw the wide spectrum of those arrested, covering almost the complete democratic camp, as clear indication that the goal of the action was to uproot it in its entirety.

=== Mainland China ===
The Office for Safeguarding National Security and the Liaison Office of the Central People's Government both issued statements of firm support for the enforcement actions and singled out Benny Tai, with the liaison office spokesperson saying, "[We] believe that the general public can clearly see the evil intentions of Benny Tai and others, and the harm caused to Hong Kong society."

Chinese Foreign Ministry spokeswoman Hua Chunying defended the arrests, saying that they were needed to stop "external forces and individuals [colluding] to undermine China's stability and security".

Before the trial, director of the Hong Kong and Macau Affairs Office Xia Baolong singled out three pro-democracy activists charged with the national security law, Joshua Wong, Jimmy Lai and Benny Tai, saying they were "extremely wicked" and "must be severely punished for their illegal actions." Hong Kong Free Press enquired with the Department of Justice about the department's position on the remarks of Xia, given its statements that comments from third parties on ongoing court proceedings were inappropriate. The department pointed to the words "in accordance with the law" which Xia had added; it refused to elaborate on the significance of this comment in this context, and on the question of whether anyone else would be able to legally use the formulation of Xia.

In June 2024, the Ministry of State Security called the case a "major test" of national security and the rule of law, and said that the verdict in the trial of the 16 defendants who had pleaded guilty, 14 of whom had been convicted, was a deterrent to "anti-China forces and foreign forces".

=== Taiwan ===
President of the Republic of China Tsai Ing-wen condemned the arrests and called on "the world's democracies to speak out against China's political repression in the territory." She vowed that Taiwan will "continue to resolutely support a free Hong Kong and stand up for our shared democratic values." Taiwan's Foreign Minister Joseph Wu described the arrests in Hong Kong as a "deep shock to those who treasure freedom" and called on the world to "unite against authoritarianism."

=== United States ===
U.S. Secretary of State Mike Pompeo said the 53 arrested on 6 January "should be released immediately and unconditionally", calling the arrest an "assault on the Hong Kong people", and said that the U.S. would consider sanctions. Antony Blinken, US President-elect Joe Biden's pick for Secretary of State, said the arrests were "an assault on those bravely advocating for universal rights" launched by the Chinese authorities. "The Biden-Harris administration will stand with the people of Hong Kong and against Beijing's crackdown on democracy," he said.

The U.S. imposed sanctions on six officials on 15 January including Hong Kong delegate to the National People's Congress Standing Committee Tam Yiu-chung, vice-chairman of the Central Leading Group on Hong Kong and Macau Affairs You Quan, deputy director of the Office for Safeguarding National Security Sun Wenqing and three officials in the National Security Division of the Hong Kong Police Frederic Choi Chin-pang, Kelvin Kong Hok-lai and Andrew Kan Kai-yan, over the mass arrests.

=== United Kingdom ===
British Foreign Secretary Dominic Raab called the arrests "a grievous attack on Hong Kong's rights and freedoms as protected under the Joint Declaration" and reiterated the UK's offer to the British National (Overseas) passport holders to emigrate to Britain. "The UK will not turn our backs on the people of Hong Kong and will continue to offer BNOs the right to live and work in the UK," Raab said.

The last British Governor of Hong Kong Chris Patten urged the European Union not to go ahead with the draft investment deal with China. "If this deal goes ahead it will make a mockery of Europe's ambitions to be taken seriously as a global political and economic player. It spits in the face of human rights and shows a delusional view of the Chinese Communist Party's trustworthiness on the international stage."

=== European Union ===
The European Union called for the immediate release of the arrestees. "We are currently analysing the situation to see how we might need to react. There are other possibilities open to us, sanctions for example," the European Commission spokesperson Peter Stano said. The German Foreign Ministry called the arrests "another milestone in a worrying development in recent months." The arrests confirmed fears that the security law "is leading to an erosion of civil liberties and the rule of law".

The European Parliament on 21 January adopted a resolution by 597 votes in favor, 17 against and 61 abstentions on the deteriorating human rights situation in Hong Kong and urged EU countries to consider introducing sanctions against Hong Kong and Chinese officials including Carrie Lam, under the EU Human Rights Global Sanction Regime. The Parliament also regretted the EU's decision to enter the EU-China Comprehensive Agreement on Investment by risking its credibility as a global human rights actor.

=== Japan ===
The government of Japan stated that it could not tolerate the mass arrests in Hong Kong, and would convey this position to China and join hands with foreign countries to deal with the Hong Kong issue. It continued to point out that after the implementation of the national security law, it had deep doubts about whether Hong Kong respects basic values such as freedom of speech and freedom of the press. Ruling party LDP lawmaker Keisuke Suzuki said that the current situation in Hong Kong was serious and it was at a critical juncture. He emphasized that the international community must regard the actions of the Hong Kong government as a violation of international agreements. He also describes the nature of the Chinese Communist Party is to deny universal values such as freedom, democracy and human rights.

=== Others ===
Maya Wang of Human Rights Watch issued a statement condemning the arrests, saying that "Beijing once again has failed to learn from its mistakes in Hong Kong: that repression generates resistance, and that millions of Hong Kong people will persist in their struggle for their right to vote and run for office in a democratically elected government."

== Bail hearings ==
On 28 February 2021, of the 55 pro-democracy figures initially arrested in January, 47 were officially charged with conspiracy to commit subversion under the national security law. They were denied bail and instead remained in detention before trial on 1 March, while Jeffrey Andrews, Lee Chi-yung, Kwong Chun-yu, James To, Michael Lau, Joseph Lee, Yuen Wai-kit and John Clancey were released on bail. Pro-democracy group Power for Democracy which co-organised the primaries announced its disbandment a day earlier on 27 February.

As of 8 March 2022, only 13 of 47 defendants had been granted bail, a reflection of the stringent requirements for bail under the national security law. By early July 2021, many of the defendants had announced their retirement from politics.

=== Marathon hearing ===
==== Day 1 ====
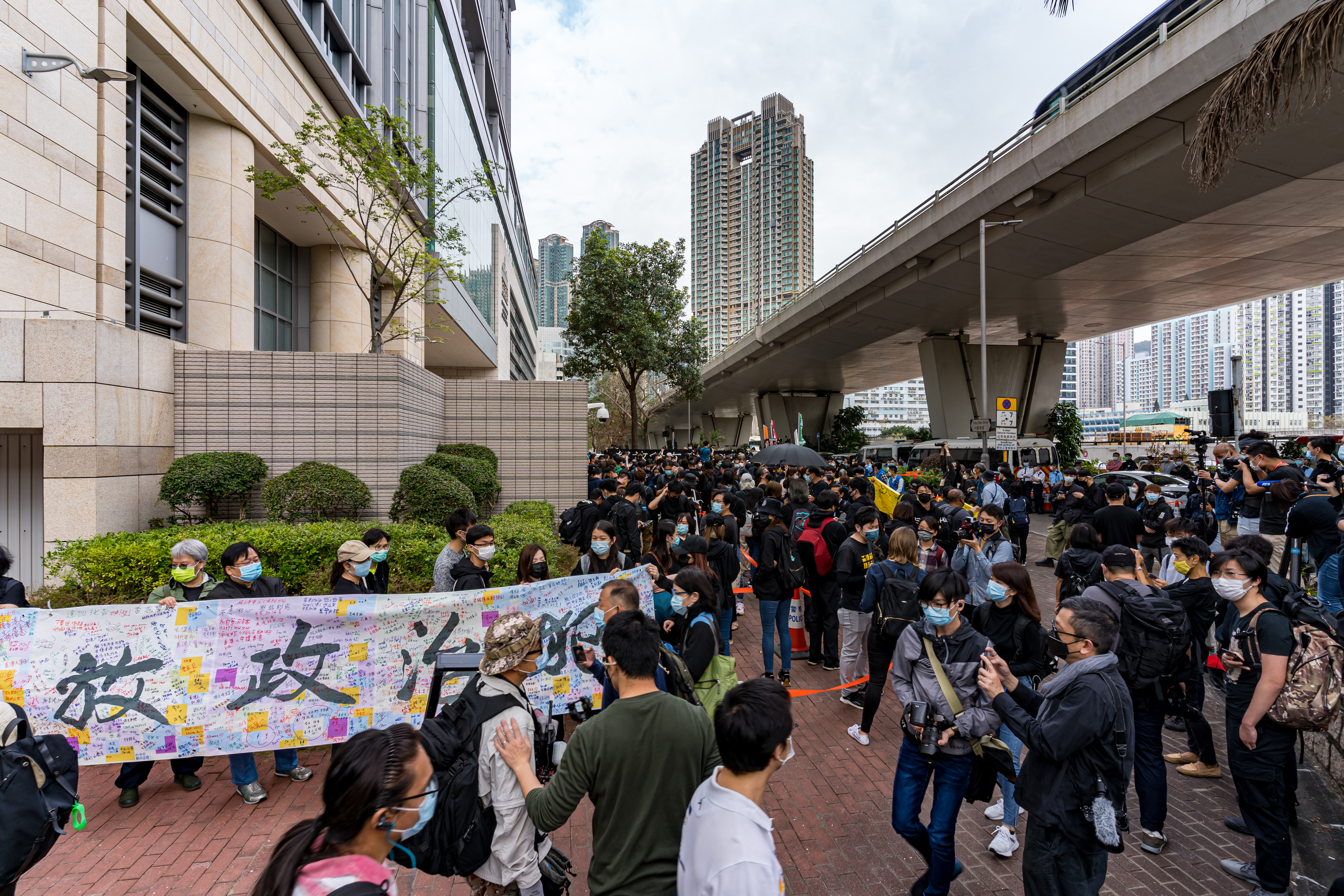
Supporters queueing outside court for a bail hearing with banner saying "release political prisoners"

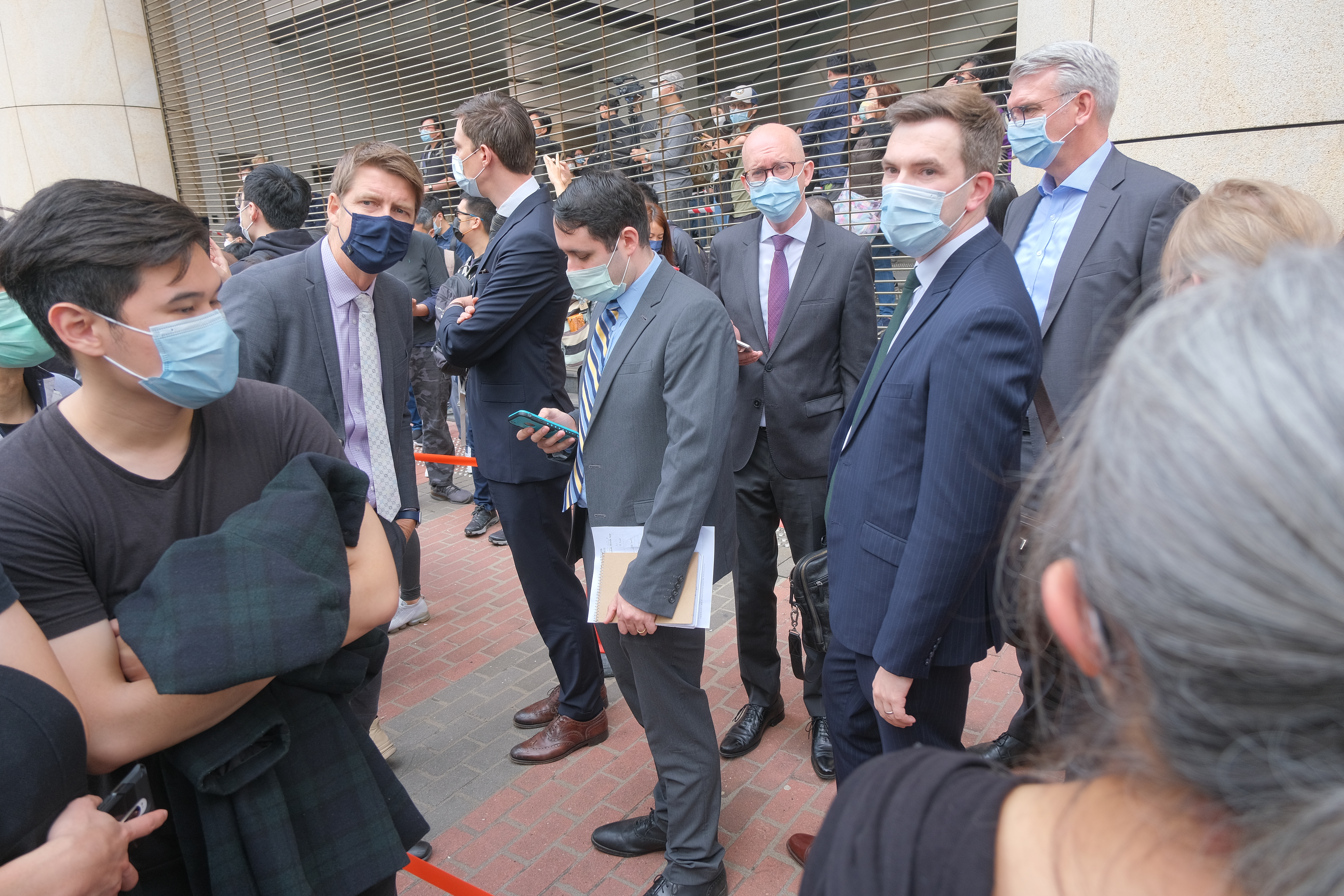
Foreign representatives waiting in line for the court hearing

The trial began on 1 March at the West Kowloon Magistrates' Court. About 1,000 supporters gathered at the court, most wearing black to express solidarity with the detainees, and some holding banners calling for the release of the "political prisoners" and chanting "Liberate Hong Kong, revolution of our times", "Fight for freedom, stand with Hong Kong" and "Five demands, not one less", slogans which were deemed illegal under the national security law, making it one of the largest rallies since the COVID-19 outbreak. Foreign diplomats joined the crowds queuing for one of the about 100 seats inside the courtroom. The police set up security lines around the court in the afternoon and forced demonstrators to disperse.

The prosecution applied to postpone the hearing until 31 May as its investigations had not finished. Alan Leong, representing the defence, questioned the police for "rushing" to press charges without finishing the investigations, some five weeks earlier than originally scheduled. Traditionally, Hong Kong's common law system put the onus on the prosecution to prove its case for objecting bail, but under the national security law the defendants instead needed to prove to the court that they would not be a national security threat if released on bail. Due to the large number of defendants being trialed at the same time, the proceedings dragged on for close to 14 hours until almost 3 a.m., resulting in four defendants being hospitalised due to exhaustion. Leo Yau, one of the defence solicitors for nine of the defendants, was arrested by the police when he attempted to pass a police cordon to get into the courtroom.

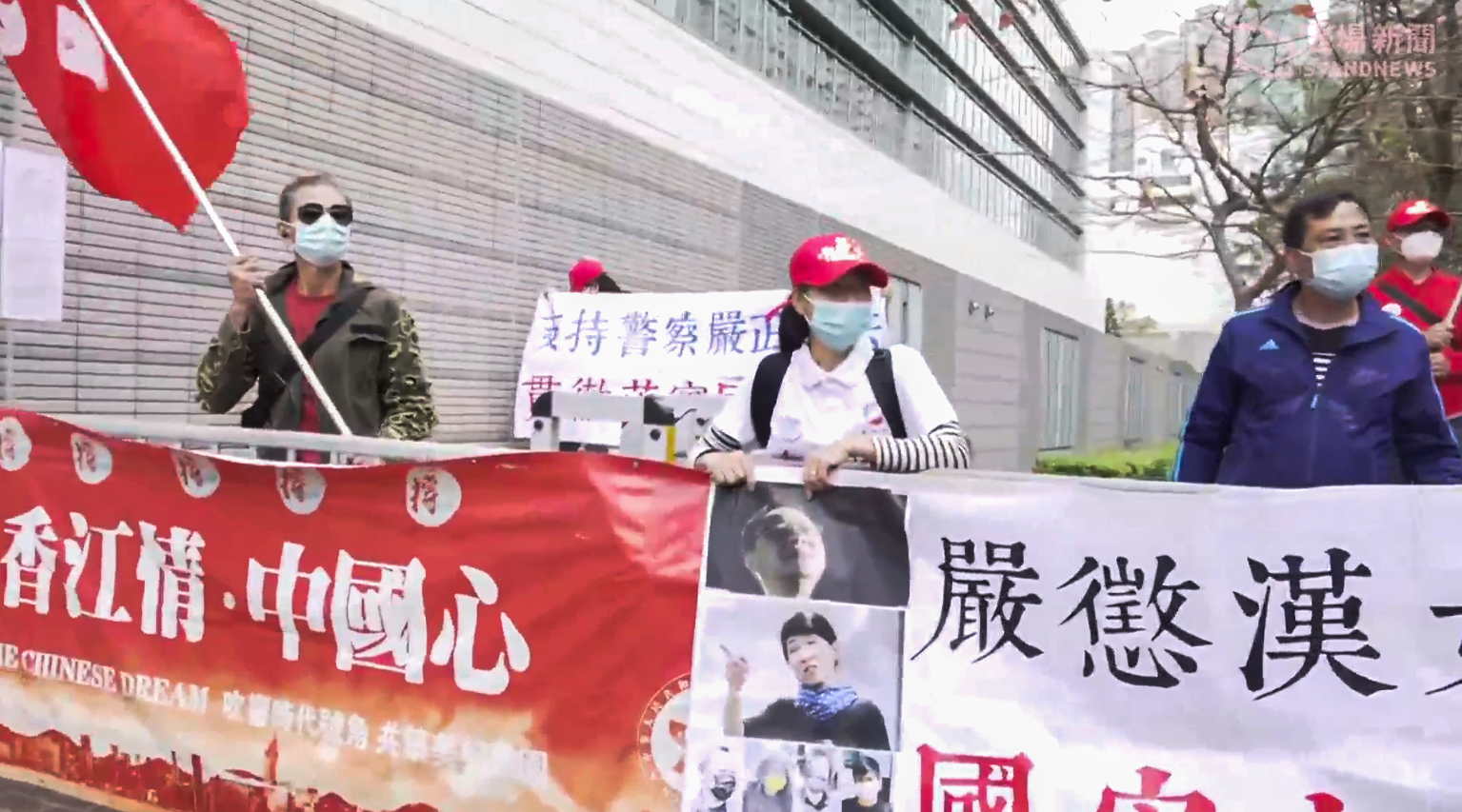
Pro-Beijing group rally outside court

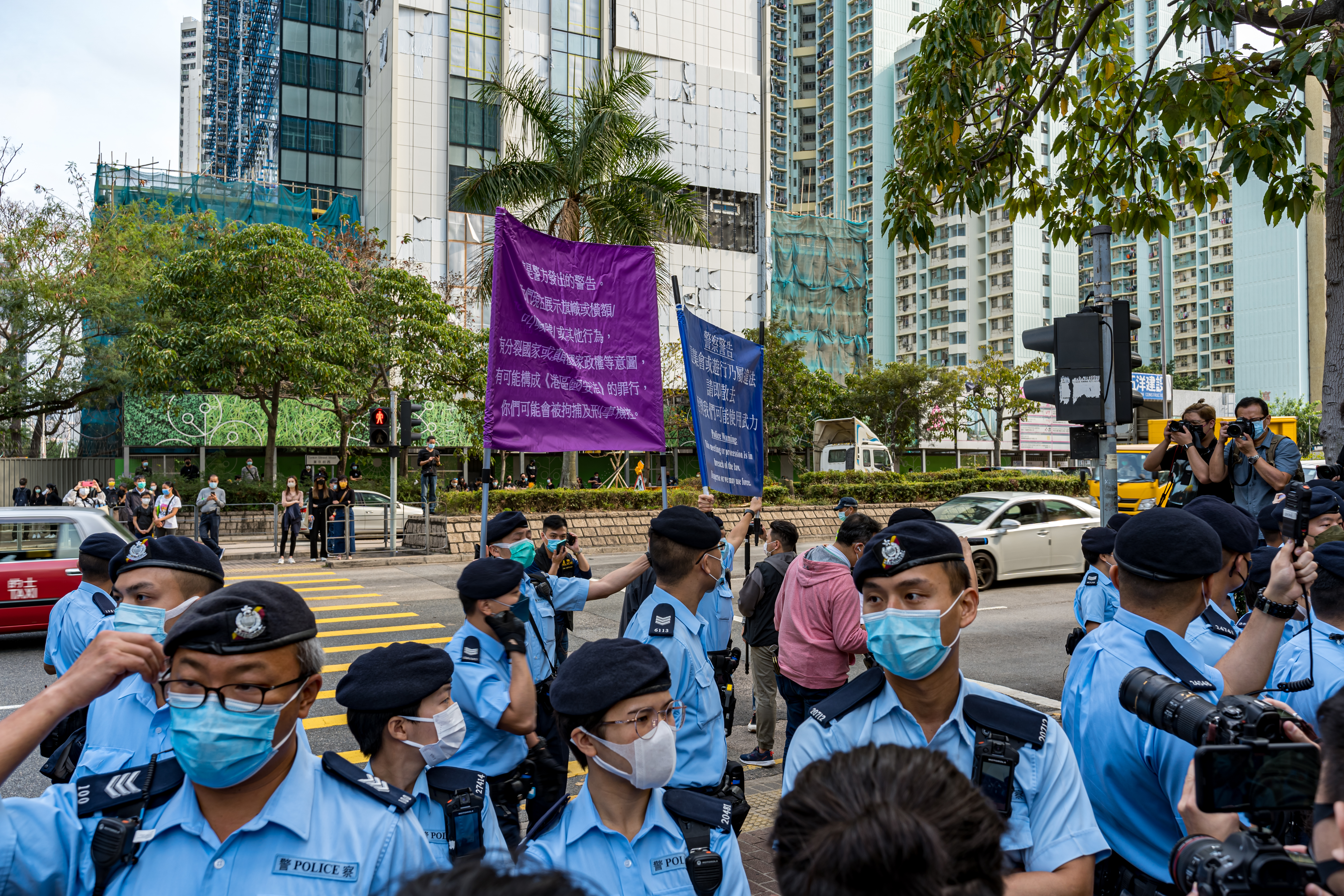
Police showed banners warning the public of violating the security law.

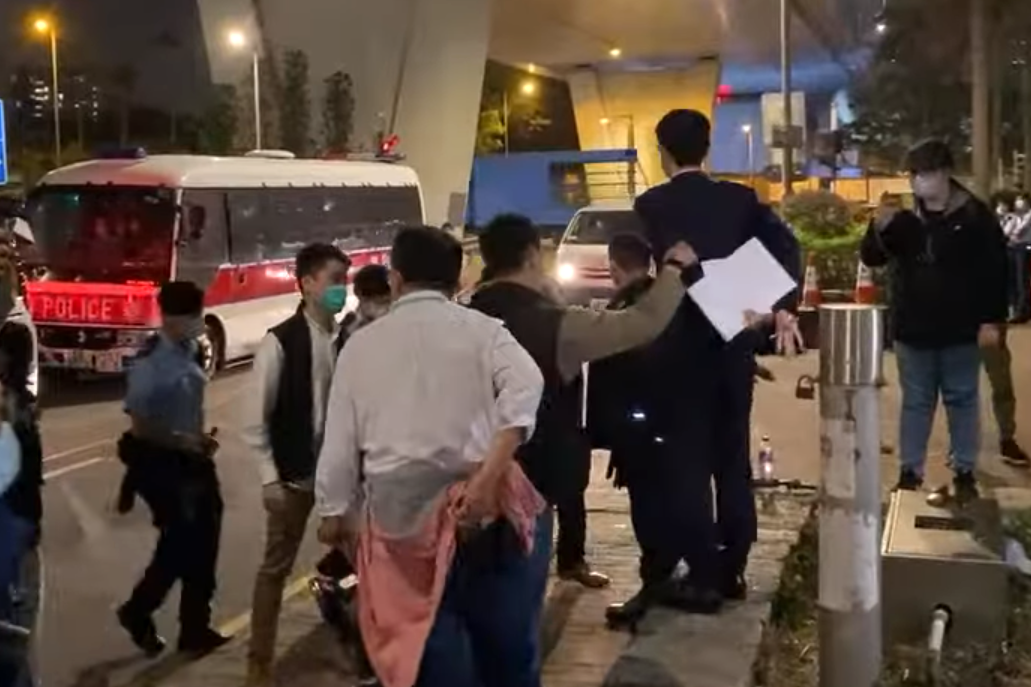
Leo Yau, a defence lawyer, was arrested by the police for trying to cross police cordon.

==== Day 2 ====
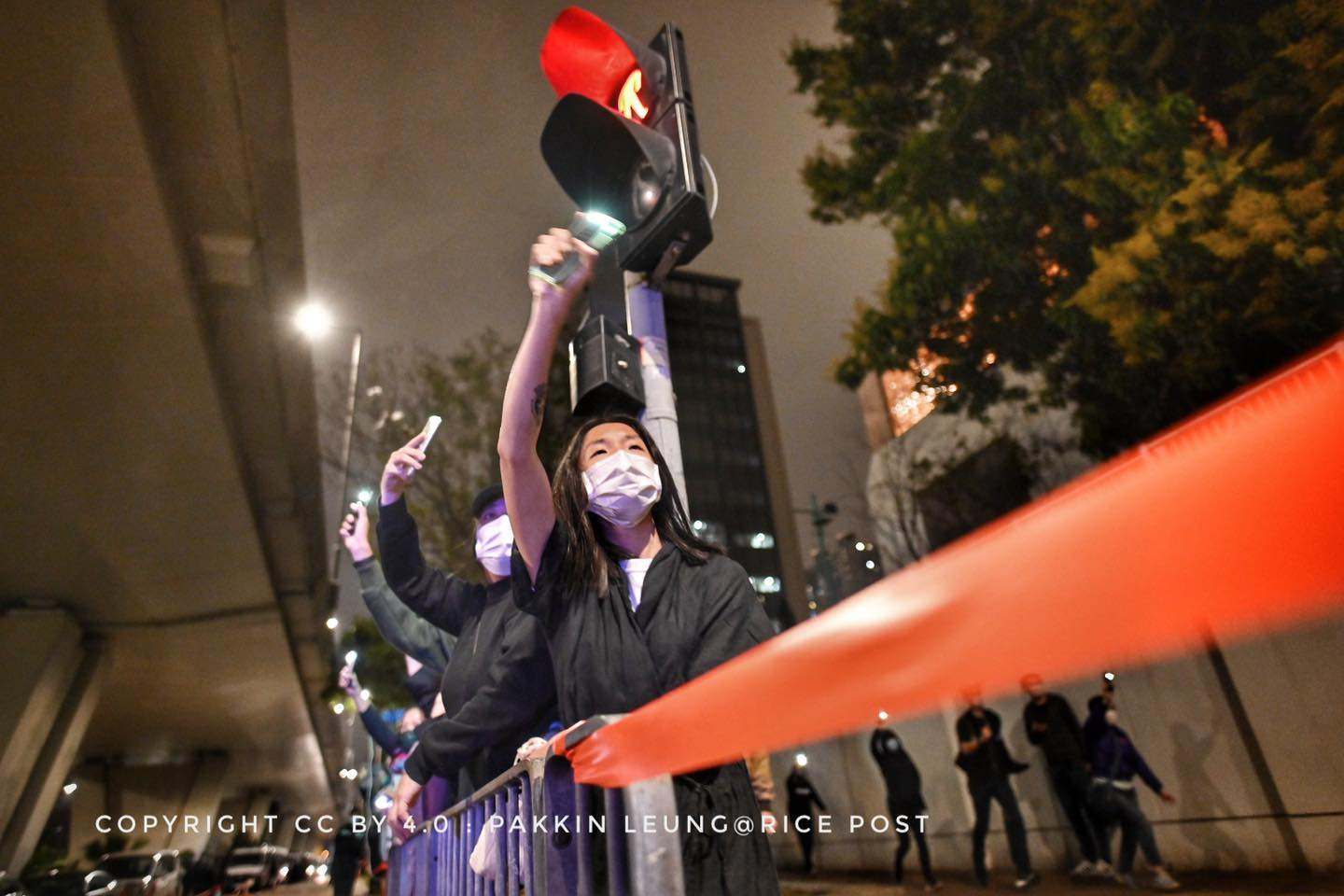
Supporters waving mobile phone flashlights to support the activists

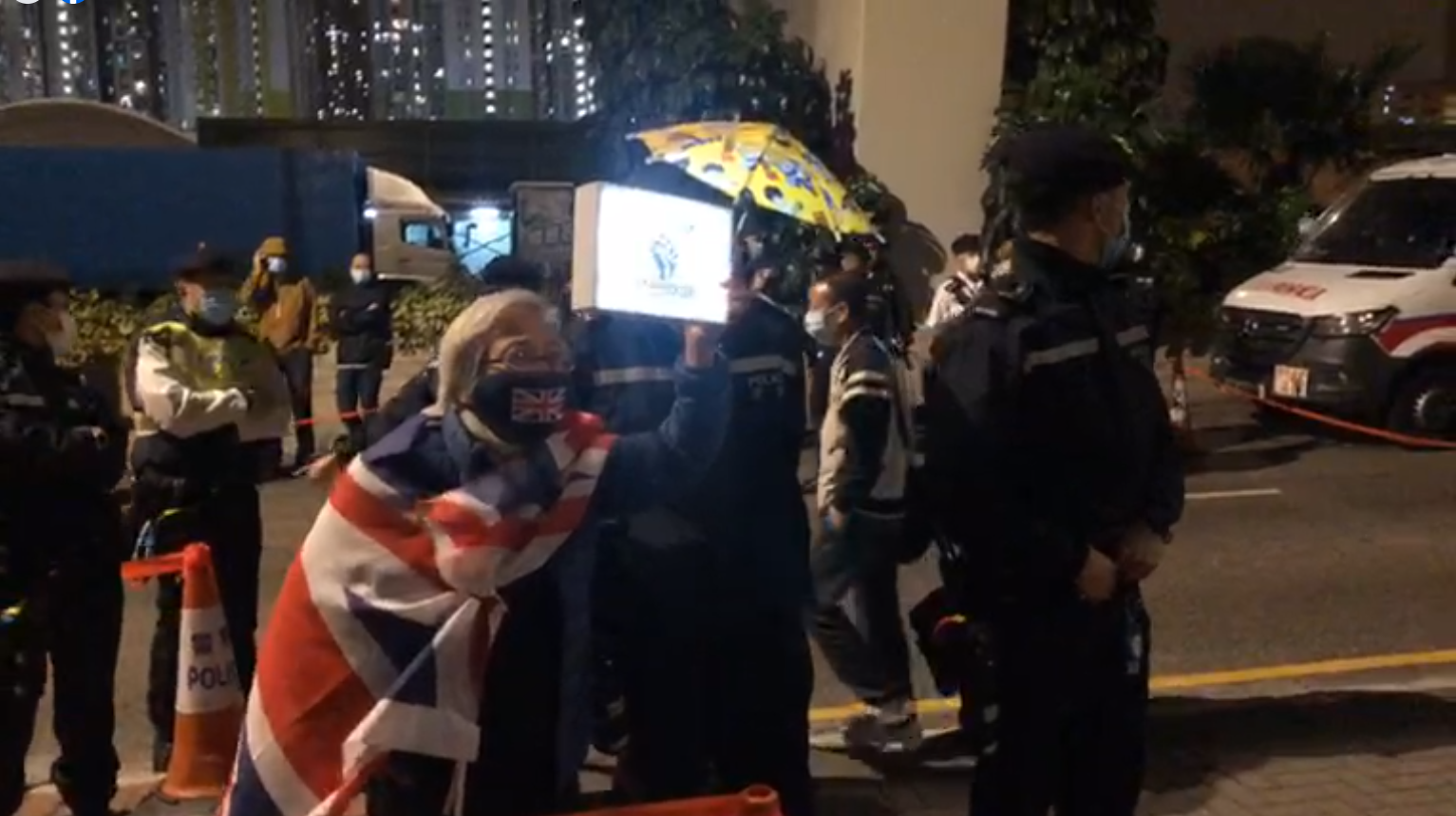
Grandma Wong expressing solidarity outside the court

The second day of the trial resumed late on the next morning, giving defendants little time to rest. Defense lawyers voiced criticism of the court over defendants not being given the opportunity to shower or change clothes for four days since they were detained on 28 February. One of the defendants, Lawrence Lau, 53, also a practicing barrister, apologized for not bathing for three days before addressing the court. He added: "When someone is stripped of their freedom, they are also stripped of their personal hygiene and appearance, which makes them lose confidence. I do not understand why I ended up in custody when I have been law-abiding my whole life." A defence counsel also told the court that his defendants had not been sent back to the Lai Chi Kok Reception Centre until nearly 7 a.m. on 2 March. "The defendants have to attend court hearings that started at 8 this morning [yesterday], which means they could only rest for at most two hours, causing them to be physically tormented," he said. Amnesty International Hong Kong program manager Lam Cho Ming warned that an extended hearing "along with insufficient time to rest could potentially violate the right to a fair trial." Chief magistrate Victor So called a halt to the second day of hearings at 10:36 p.m. on 2 March.

Another defendant, Winnie Yu, 33, a nurse and chairwoman of the Hospital Authority Employees Alliance, was suspended from her duties by the Hong Kong Hospital Authority after she was prosecuted.

==== Day 3 ====
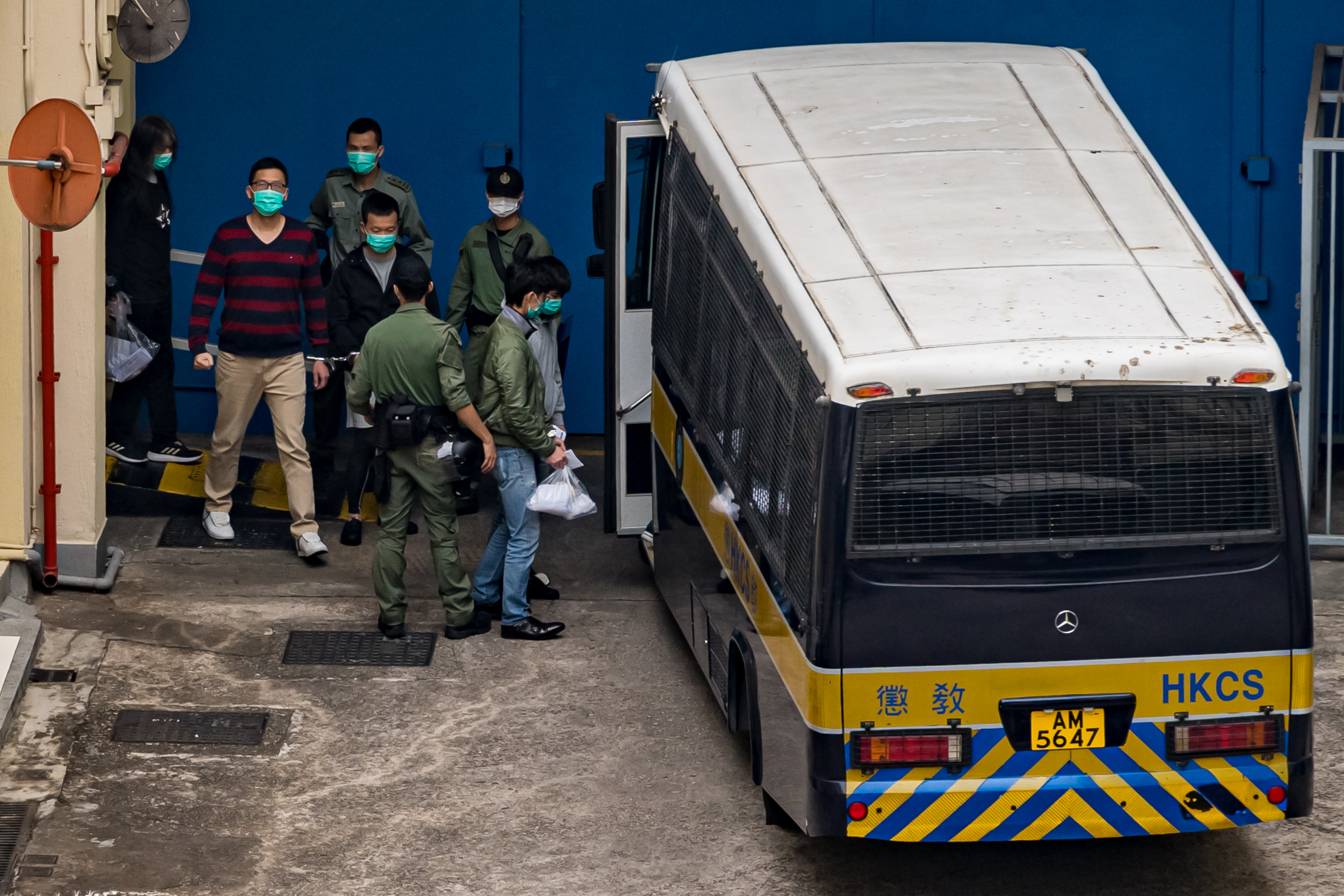
Defendants Lam Cheuk-ting, Leung Kwok-hung and Raymond Chan at the Lai Chi Kok Reception Centre before being sent to the court

Eight defendants had not addressed the court regarding their bail applications in the more than 24-hour marathon hearing. On the third day on 3 March 47 pro-democracy defendants have yet to submit their statements on bail. Before the trial started at 12 pm, the live broadcast system showed the problem of not being able to hear the conversation or voice in the court again, causing the family members to question the "secret interrogation." On the other hand, the live broadcasts in the press room and the auditorium both had problems with pictures and no sound, which caused the reporters on the spot to clamor. Barrister Margaret Ng said that the court has no way to control its own procedures, as she questioned the judicial independence. However, Kit Hung, the senior news director of the Judiciary, stated that no in-court voices will be played before the court session. This statement caused dissatisfaction with Figo Chan, the convener of Civil Human Rights Front.

At the same time, four Civic Party defendants Alvin Yeung, Kwok Ka-ki, Jeremy Tam and Lee Yue-shun announced their resignations from the party, with Yeung resigning from the party. Barrister Alan Leong, chairman of the party, terminated his legal representation of the four. Lam Cheuk-ting, Clarisse Yeung and Gwyneth Ho also told the court they had terminated the services of their legal representatives. Alvin Yeung said before addressing the court: "As a barrister, I would never have imagined that I would have to address the court in the docks. On March 2 five years ago, I was sworn in as a legislative councillor, fighting for Hongkongers, but five years later, I am fighting for my own freedom." Chief Magistrate Victor So adjourned the third day proceedings at 8:30 pm.

==== Day 4 ====
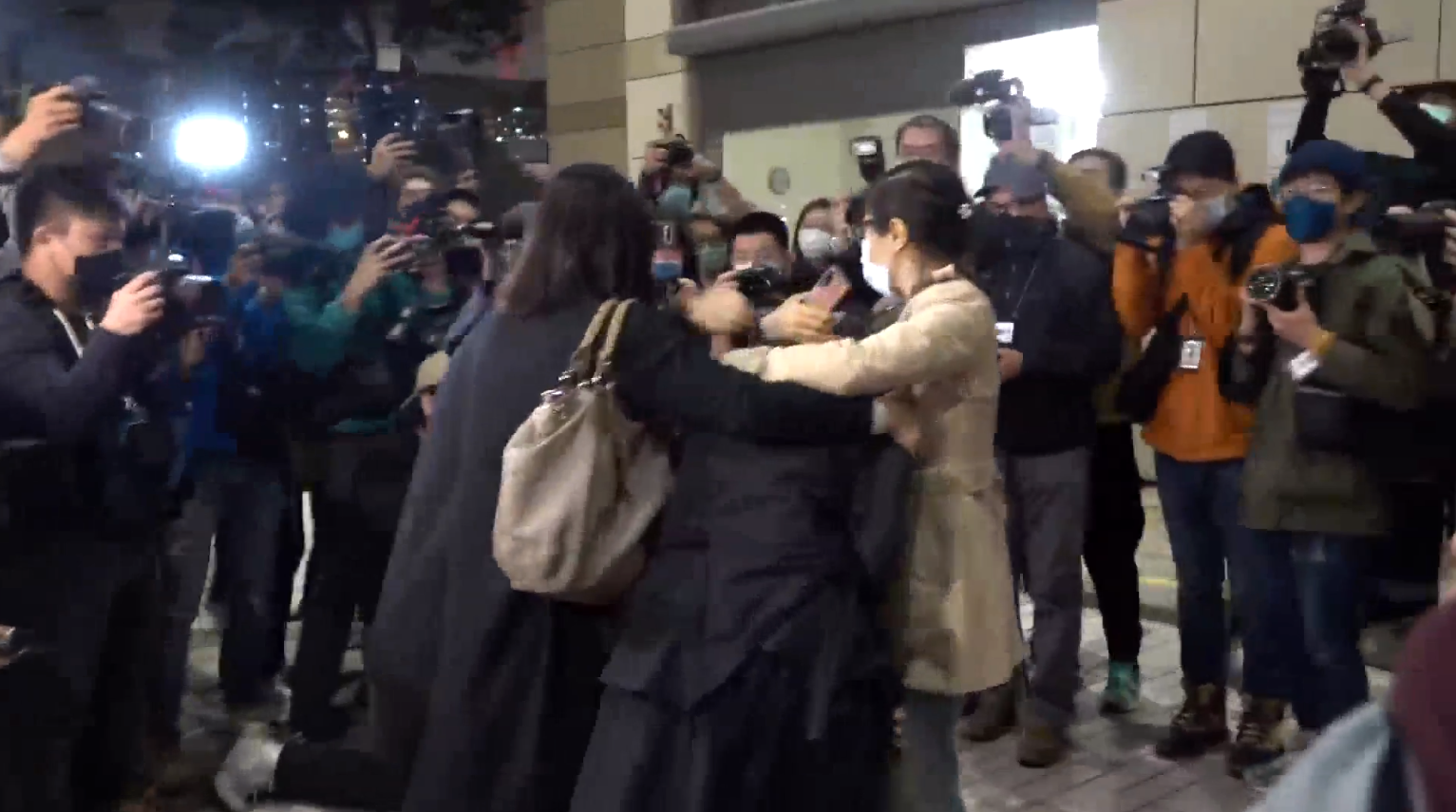
Hendrick Lui's foster mother ran to the basement hall of the court and knelt down and wept bitterly.

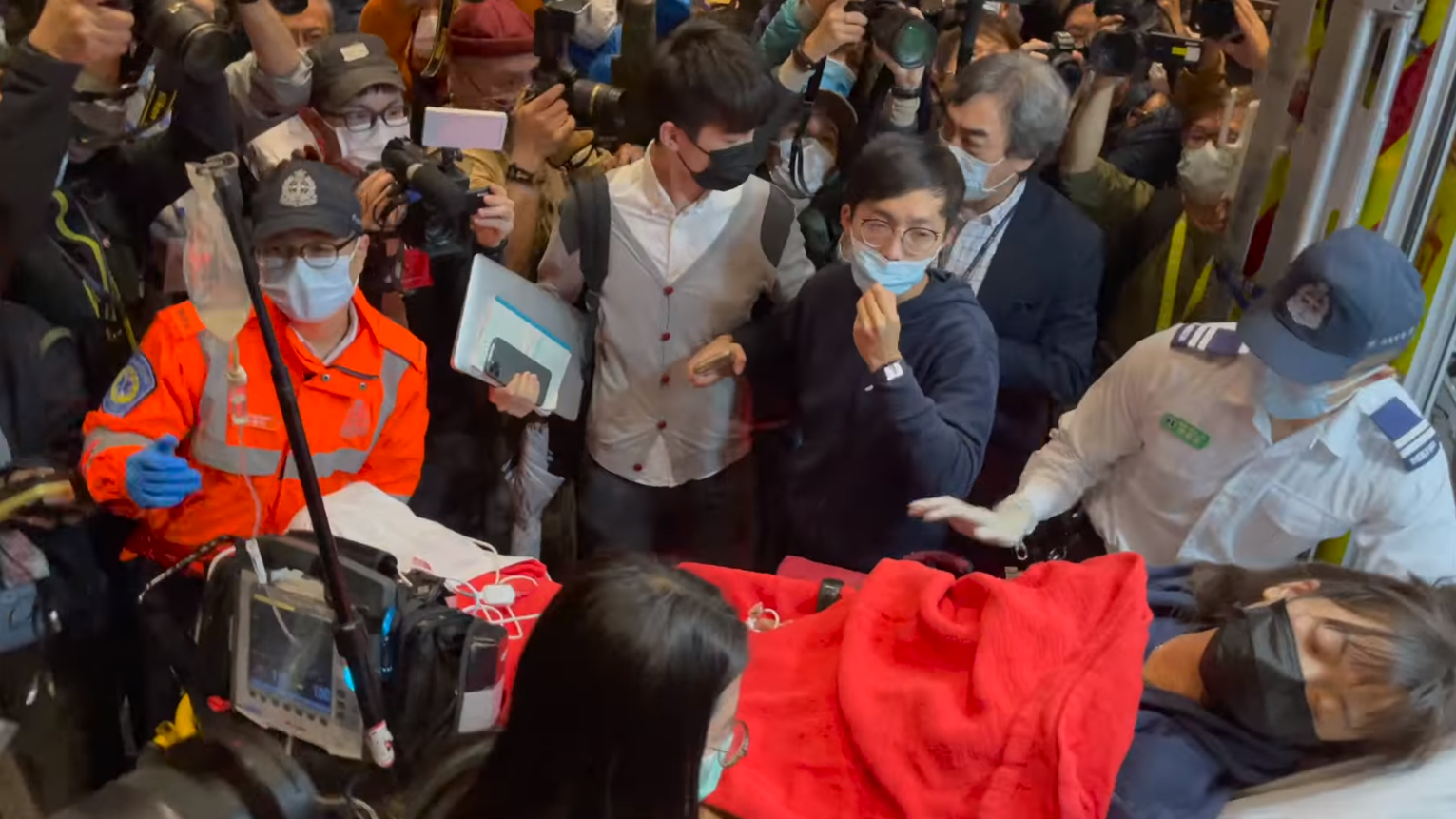
Clarisse Yeung being brought back to the hospital

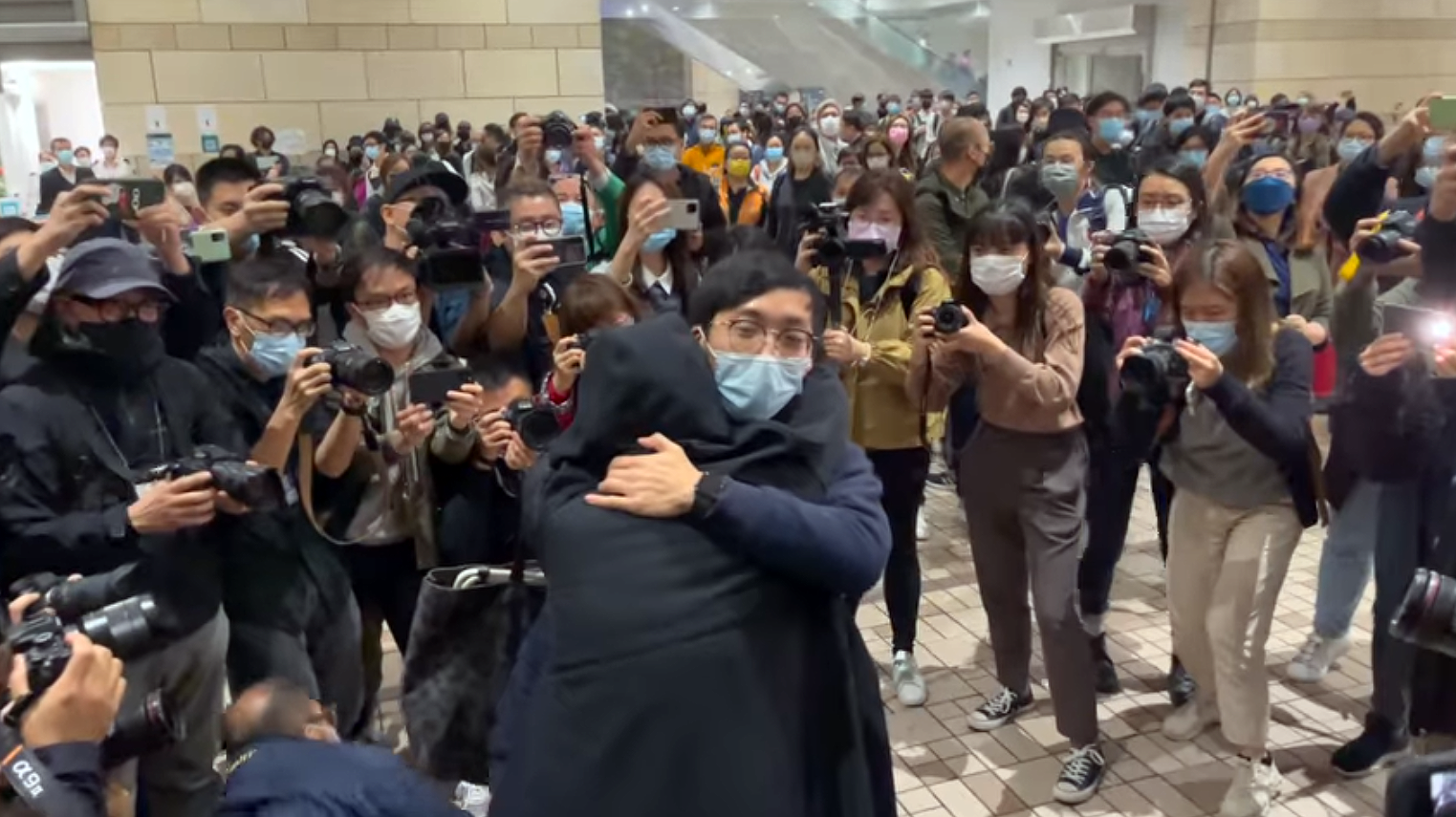
TSW Connection member Lam Chun hugs a family of defendant.

All defendants finished their addresses to the court with proceedings deep into the fourth day on 4 March. Hundreds of people queued in the rain for entering the courthouse before the proceedings until nighttime, defying police warnings of violating the national security law.

Some media outlets applied to the court for lifting reporting strict restrictions on the bail proceedings which could only report the name of the court and the magistrate of the case, the date and place of the proceedings, the name of the defendants and their legal representation, the offence they were charged of and the result of a proceedings. The defence proposed a set of relaxed reporting rules, with Barrister David Ma saying that an open, fair and transparent trial was the "cornerstone of the rule of law", pointing out that freedom of speech and the press are respected under the national security law. A representative of Senior Counsel Hectar Pun argued that "if the media cannot report on this open hearing, then it will undermine the principle of open justice." Chief Magistrate Victor So refused the plea on the grounds that the general public or the press may not be able to determine whether a statement made in court fell under the scope of "legal argument," causing citizens to accidentally breach the restrictions, which would be "a bit dangerous for them".

Chief Magistrate Victor So initially granted bail to 15 of the 47 defendants at around 8 pm, but the decision was immediately appealed by the Department of Justice. The 32 remaining defendants were denied bail on grounds that they would be likely to continue to commit acts endangering national security, meaning they would have to be remain in detention until the trial begins on 31 May. When the defendants left the court, the supporters who waited outside waved goodbye and thanked their lawyers. Some also chanted "Five demands, not one less", "Political prisoners are not guilty" and "Hongkonger won't die."

=== Other hearings ===
The hearings on the case resumed on 31 May 2021. The court postponed further proceedings until 8 July. Until 28 June, defendants in the case will be presented with evidence and allowed to enter a plea, otherwise, their case will be moved to the High Court, where some analysts say, could consider harsher sentences than lower courts.

The hearings were further delayed for several times without clear trial date by judges following a request by prosecution, which had asked for more time to prepare the case. The prosecution sought to transfer it to a higher court with powers to order longer jail sentences. A High Court judge, in April 2022, called for a speedy trial in the lower court, and also revealed that 11 defendants intended to plead guilty when the case was officially committed to the High Court.

On 1 June, Chief Magistrate Peter Law in the West Kowloon Court ruled that 17 defendants will be transferred to the High Court for trial. A further 27 defendants were committed to the High Court on 2 June. Two more were transferred on 6 June, and the final defendant, Gordon Ng, who requested for a committal proceedings, was transferred on 6 July.

=== Bail appeals ===
Defendants leaving court after bail granted

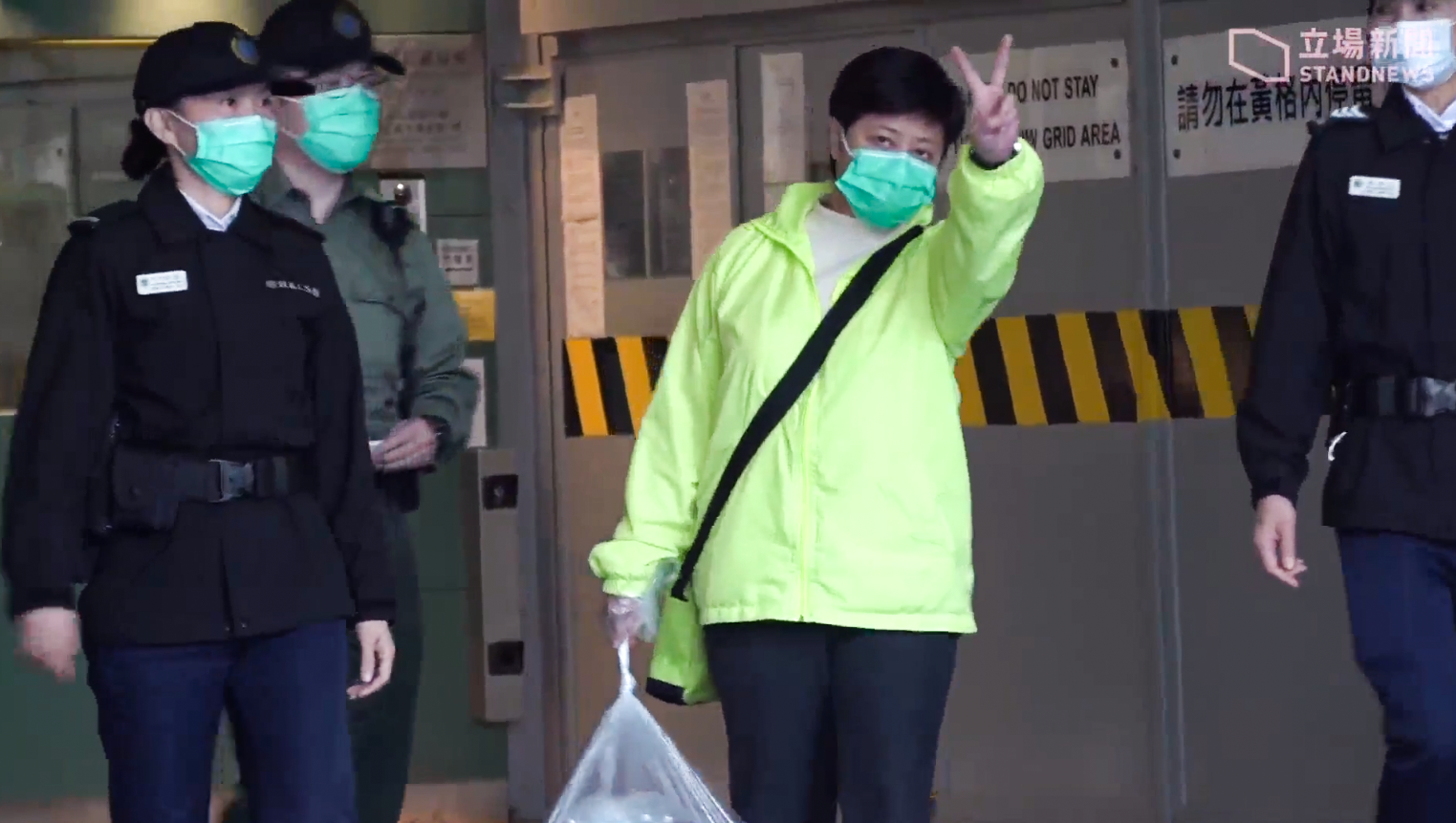
Helena Wong, 11 March 2021

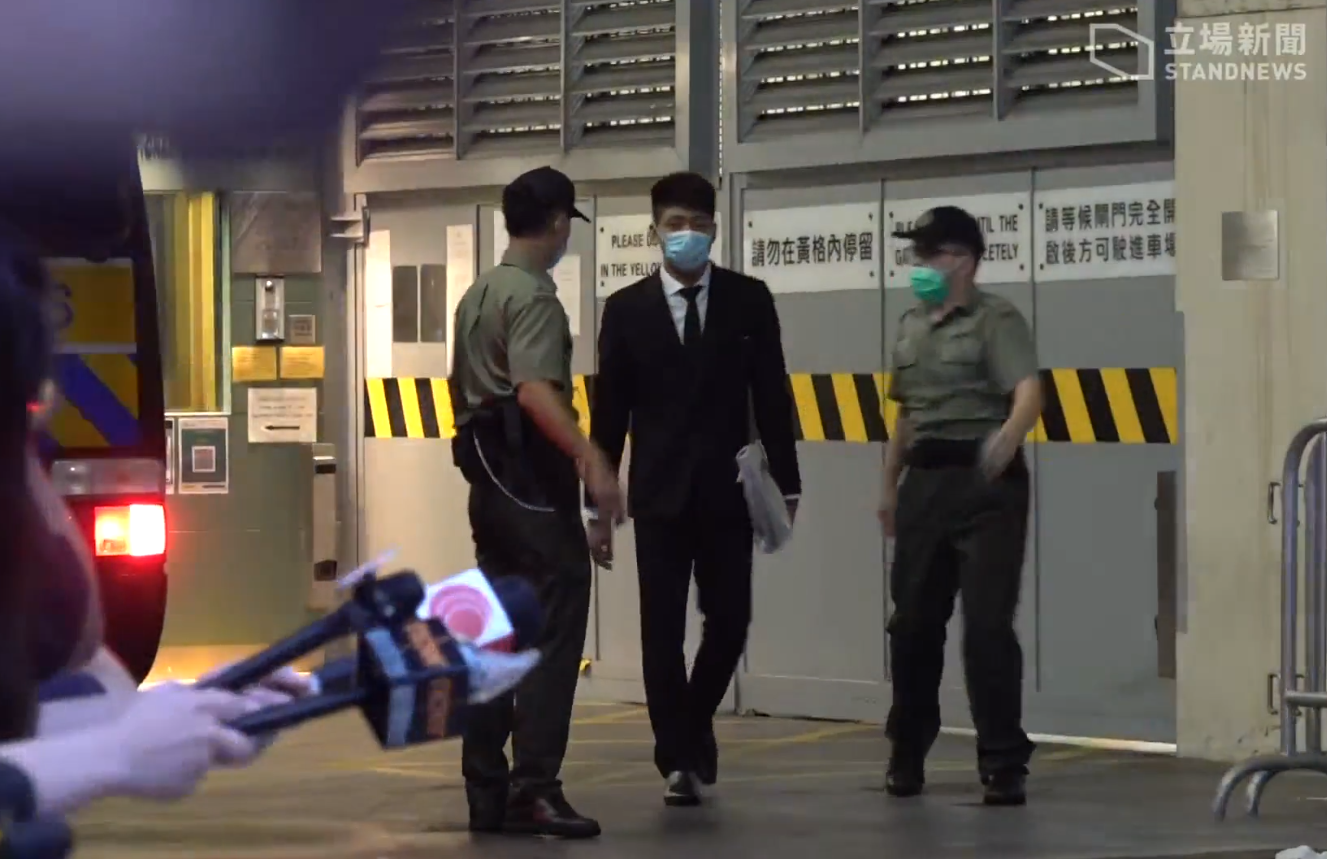
Owen Chow, 22 June 2021

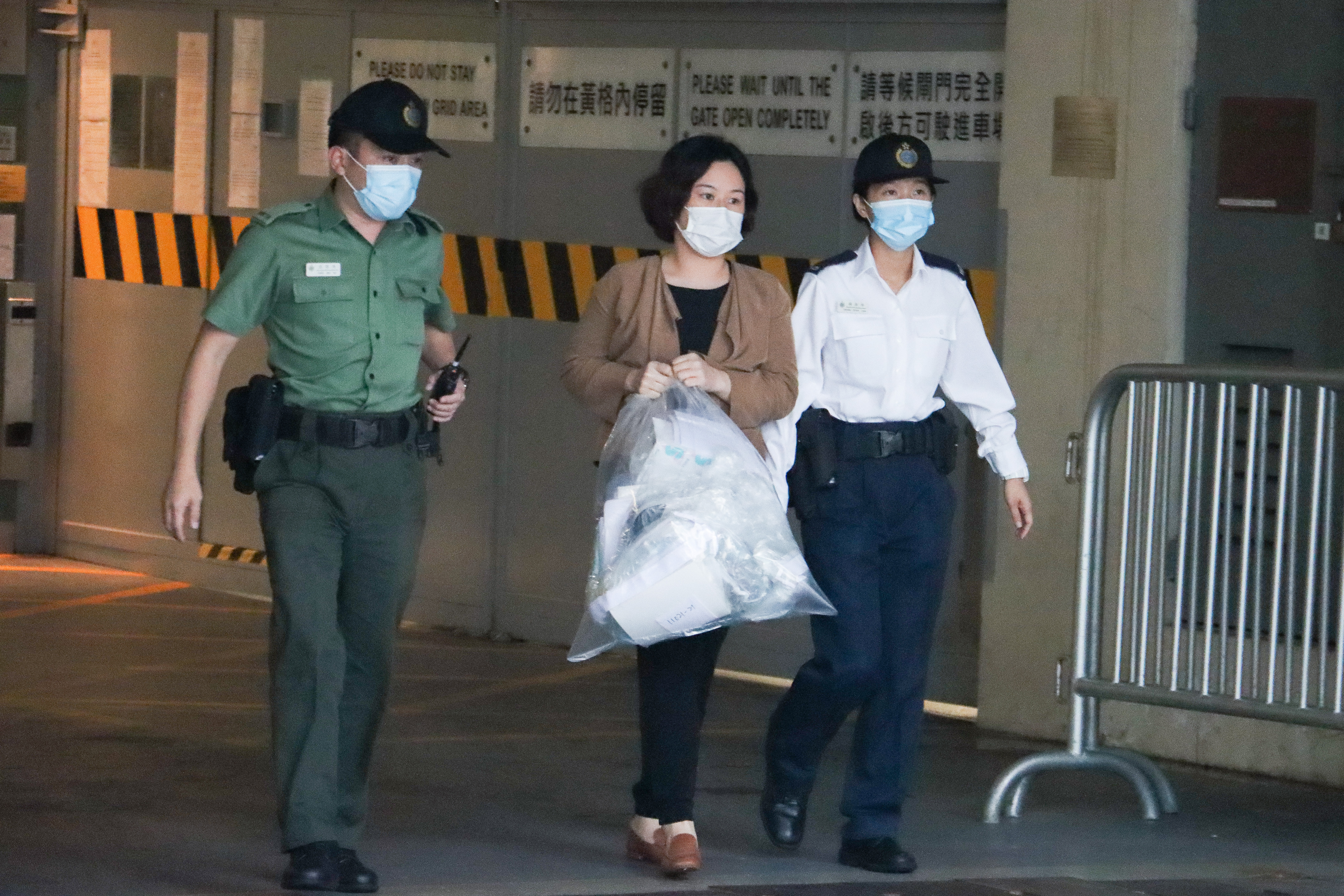
Winnie Yu, 28 July 2021

Amongst the 47 defendants, bail of 15 were appealed by the prosecution. By 15 March, judge Victor So ruled in favour of the prosecution over four (Jeremy Tam, Sam Cheung, Ng Kin-wai, Kwok Ka-ki), seven were bailed out by the court, while Clarisse Yeung, Lawrence Lau, Hendrick Lui and Mike Lam were also released on bail after prosecutors dropped the appeal.

Of the 21 defendants presented to the courts on the next day on 12 March, Judge Victor So, who was the magistrate who granted the appeals in the first place, rejected 11 appeal applications on 12 March, while the ten remaining defendants withdrew their applications. Other bail appeals were mainly handled by High Court judge Esther Toh.

==== Bailed out (13) ====
- Helena Wong: approved on 11 March; Wong, after release, reunited with her husband and said: "I was really calm while I was in custody, as I know I did nothing wrong, but the bail hearing was really tiring in the first few days."
- Clarisse Yeung: approved on 12 March after appeal dropped by prosecution.
- Mike Lam: approved on 12 March after appeal dropped by prosecution.
- Lawrence Lau: approved on 12 March after appeal dropped by prosecution.
- Hendrick Lui: approved on 12 March after appeal dropped by prosecution.
- Tat Cheng: approved on 13 March.
- Michael Pang: approved on 13 March.
- Ricky Or: approved on 13 March.
- Kalvin Ho: approved on 14 March.
- Sze Tak-loy: approved on 14 March, for serving the community as district councillors and cooperating with various government departments.
- Lee Yue-shun: approved on 14 March, for serving the community as district councillors and cooperating with various government departments.
- Raymond Chan: approved on 16 September, for cooperating with the government as MP by supporting some government bills, and having been named by LegCo president Andrew Leung as the most diligent lawmaker.
- Wong Ji-yuet: approved on 21 December, to finish her bachelor's degree, and she had not explicitly advocated for international sanctions against the authorities, and for Hong Kong independence, during the primaries.

==== Remanded (34) ====
- Ng Kin-wai: denied on 11 March 2021; denied on 6 June 2022, for clear determination to promote Hong Kong independence.
- Jeremy Tam: denied on 13 March; denied on 22 April for signing a letter in September 2019 supporting the Hong Kong Human Rights and Democracy Act.
- Sam Cheung: denied on 14 March; denied on 9 April for "determined and resolute" in his contribution to the democrats' scheme.
- Leung Kwok-hung: denied on 29 March; denied on 13 May for resolute in his position against the government and the national security law and that his risk of reoffending was high due to international support.
- Ben Chung: denied on 31 March for seeking of crowdfunding, alleged to be part of a money laundering scheme, and his pivotal role in the defunct organization Power for Democracy; denied on 1 June.
- Kwok Ka-ki: denied on 13 March; denied on 9 April for inviting U.S. interference on Hong Kong affairs.
- Jimmy Sham: denied on 12 April; denied on 13 May for being a "determined and resolute young man" who had vowed to continue to push for the government to give in to the protesters five demands and that he was at risk of reoffending if granted bail.
- Claudia Mo: denied on 14 April; denied on 28 May for her exchanges on WhatsApp with Western media were a "threat to national security".
- Chui Chi-kin: denied on 22 April for causing fear and inciting hatred against the government by uploading a video on his YouTube channel which appeared to show a large contingent of People's Liberation Army military vehicles crossing into Hong Kong from mainland China.
- Andrew Wan: denied on 28 May citing the contents on his computer that advocated for Hong Kong independence, and the formation of a group which called for international sanctions against Hong Kong officials who allegedly permitted "excessive police violence".
- Henry Wong: denied on 1 June; denied on 1 September for his active participation of international front, which is calling for sanctions against Hong Kong and Chinese government officials.
- Gary Fan: denied on 1 June; denied on 8 September, for being a "determined and resolute man" who had vowed to continue to push for the authorities to give in to the protesters' five demands and he had called for all parties to act together in opposing the government.
- Gordon Ng: denied on 1 June; denied on 14 September 2022.
- Andrew Chiu: denied on 1 June.
- Nathan Lau: denied on 1 June.
- Roy Tam: denied on 23 August, citing on the election campaign speech of his stance against the Hong Kong government, police and the national security law. In addition, he is also calling for international sanctions against Hong Kong officials and senior police officers on his Facebook page, although he removed his account after promulgation of national security law.
- Gwyneth Ho: withdrew bail application on 8 September after request to lift reporting restrictions was rejected by Toh. Ho was represented by Douglas Kwok after the original representing barrister Chow Hang-tung was arrested that day.
- Frankie Fung: denied on 4 November, for showing himself to be persistent in promoting and spreading subversive ideologies due to his media outlet that he co-funded, which is serving as a platform to promote seditious ideologies and calling for international sanctions against Hong Kong and Chinese officials.
- Carol Ng: denied on 20 December, for having an international influence as a result of her trade union work and having called for resistance against the authorities after losing the primary election and shown determination to resist against the government.
- Lam Cheuk-ting: denied on 13 May 2022, for using his Patreon account to enhance international lobbying and resistance against the government and having a strong political influence due to his stance on lobby for sanctions.

==== Special cases ====
- Wu Chi-wai: emergency application approved on 7 May to attend the funeral of his 92-year-old father after the denial of his initial request by the correctional department sparked wide criticism. Remanded in custody before and after the temporary bail.
- Owen Chow: approved on 22 June to enable Chow to finish his nursing degree, and he had not explicitly called for Hong Kong independence during the primaries; re-arrested on 12 January 2022 and bail revoked following a court ruling that he had broken his bail conditions and endangered national security through online postings of an inciteful nature which related to the 2019 Prince Edward station attack and the 2019 Yuen Long attack.
- Winnie Yu: denied on 1 June; approved on 28 July after observing in her written explanation that there was no evidence that Yu ever had an international connection; re-arrested on 7 March and bail revoked for breaking bail conditions.

== Pre-trial events ==
As per an order signed by Secretary for Justice, Paul Lam, dated 13 August 2022, the case was to be handled without a jury due to the "involvement of foreign elements", "personal safety of jurors and their family members", and a "risk of perverting the course of justice if the trial is conducted with a jury".

On 18 August 2022, authorities in Hong Kong said that 29 defendants had entered guilty pleas in court; the pleas had been entered earlier but the announcement was only made on that day, after reporting restrictions had been lifted. In November, Ng Kin-wai changed his mind and indicated that he also would plead guilty. On 11 January 2023, a panel of three judges ruled that those who had pleaded guilty would be sentenced only after the trial of the 17 who had pleaded not guilty. On 17 January, Mike Lam indicated through his lawyer that he would plead guilty.

== Trial ==
HKSAR v NG Ching-hang & Ors HKSAR v Tai Yiu Ting & Ors
- Court: High Court of Hong Kong
- Decided: 19 November 2024
- Citation: HCCC69/2022, HCCC70/2022
- Transcripts: Reasons for Verdict, Reasons for Sentence

Court membership
- Judges sitting: Andrew Chan, Alex Lee Wan-tang, Johnny Chan Jong-herng

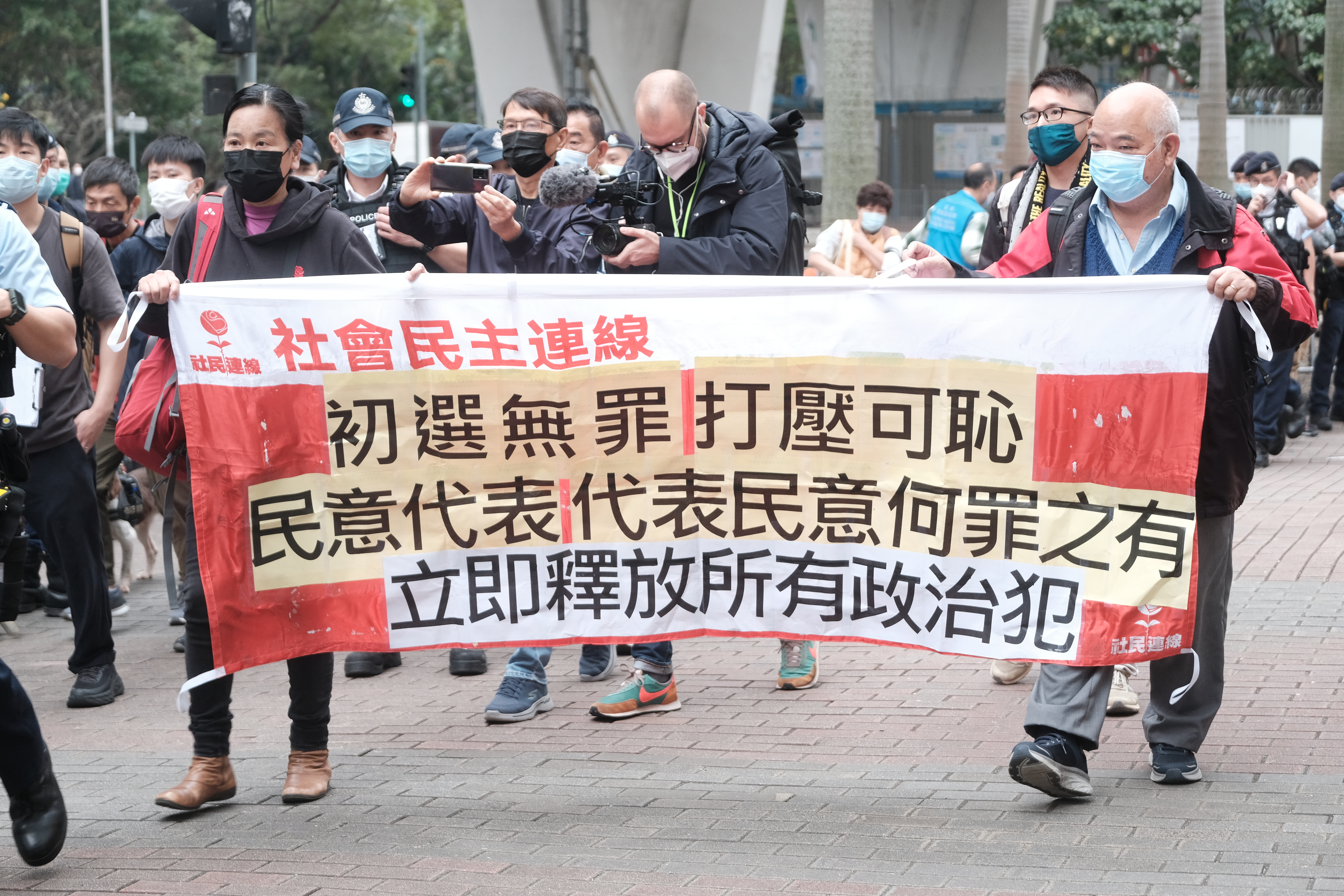
Protest by League of Social Democrats outside court before trial began

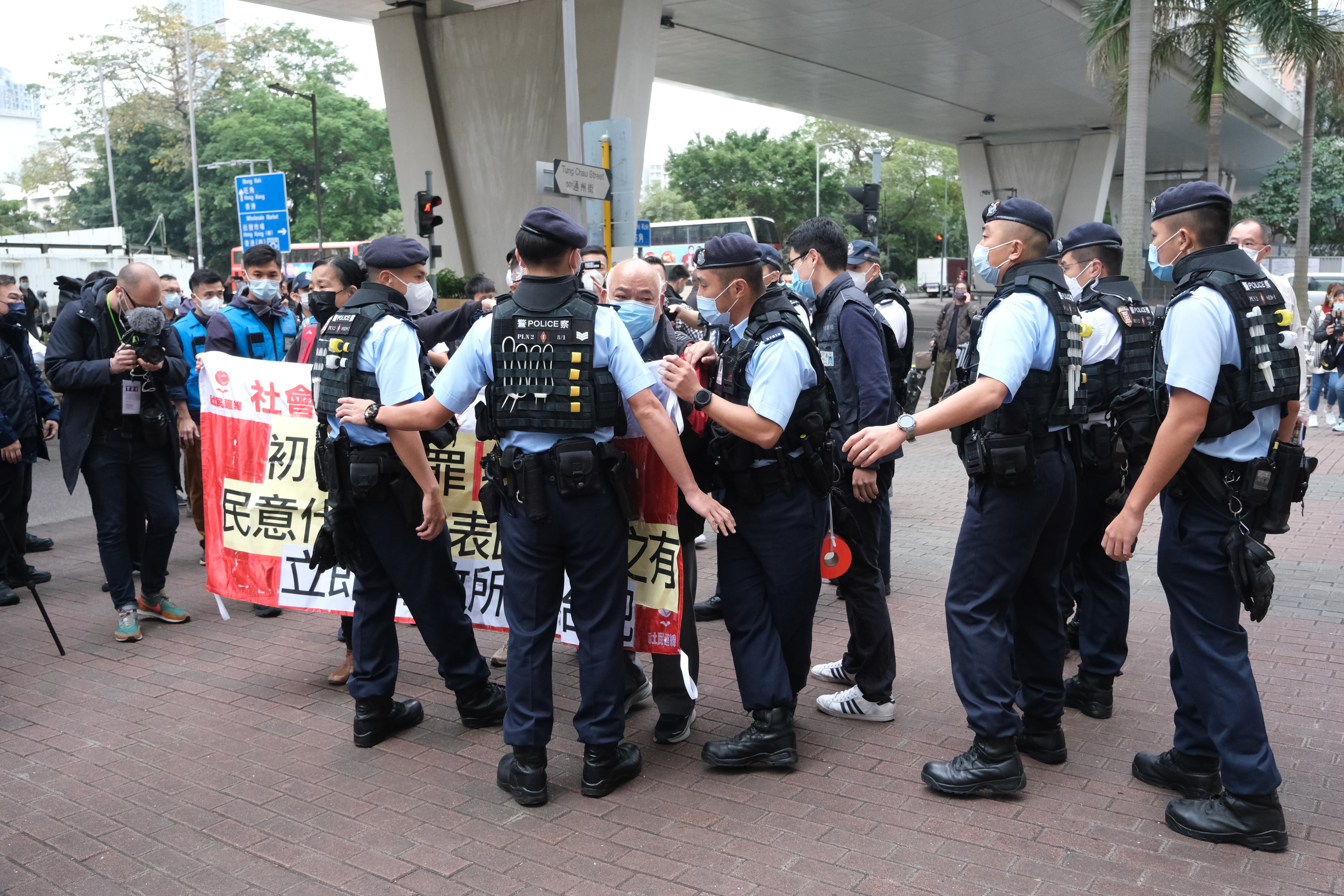
Protestors surrounded by police

When the trial began on 6 February 2023, nearly two years after the arrest, it was expected to run for 90 days. Those who have pleaded guilty will not be sentenced until after the trial.

League of Social Democrats, one of the last active pro-democracy groups, organised a small protest under a heavy police presence, decrying the crackdown as "shameless" and calling for the release of all political prisoners. Representatives from eleven countries including the UK and the US, along with the European Union were also among those queueing up.

The trial opened with the court reading out the charge and formally taking pleas from 18 defendants in front of three national security judges – Andrew Chan, Johnny Chan and Alex Lee. All 18 repeated that they would plead not guilty except Ng Kin-wai and Mike Lam, both changed their mind earlier.

The key issue of this case is whether the defendants reached an agreement to indiscriminately veto the budget in order to force the dissolution of Legislative Council and the resignation of Chief Executive, which amounts to "subversion".

Prosecutors told the West Kowloon Magistrates Court that the accused had conspired to seriously interfere, disrupt or undermine the duties and functions of the Hong Kong government, "with a view to subverting the state power". An amended filing revealed the prosecution had dropped one accusation that the group intended to use "the threat of force", a change noted in court by Gwyneth Ho, one of the defendants. Leung Kwok-hung, on the other hand, said in court that there was "no crime to admit" and that "it is not a crime to act against a totalitarian regime".

Prosecutor Anthony Chau said that if the elections were not delayed due to COVID-19, the alleged conspiracy would have been "carried out to fruition."

As the trial was underway, a suspected projectile shattered a window at the West Kowloon Law Courts Building in February. Secretary for Justice Paul Lam condemned "any violent acts intended to disrupt or damage the due administration of justice". Protective screens were installed along a flyover next to the courthouse in late March.

The trial ended on 4 December 2023.

=== Trial timeline ===
Procedures	Days
Prosecution case	58
Opening submission	5
Witness (Au)	24
Witness (Chiu)	17
Witness (Chung)	3
Witness (Lam)	1
Witness (Mr. X)	1
Application of co-conspirator rule	4
Half-time submission	2
Defence case	50
Tat Cheng	7
Michael Pang	4
Kalvin Ho	4
Lawrence Lau	2
Sze Tak-loy	4
Gwyneth Ho	10
Raymond Chan	3
Owen Chow	6
Ricky Or	3
Lee Yue-shun	4
Winnie Yu	4

=== Witnesses for prosecution ===
The court also heard that four people who are to plead guilty, Au Nok-hin, Andrew Chiu, Ben Chung, Mike Lam, will give evidence as witnesses for the prosecution. Au, Chiu, and Chung each testified for 24, 17, and 3 days.

==== Timeline of primaries ====
Au started testifying against fellow democrats on the 6th day of trial, revealed that the plan for the primaries was first floated in January 2020, in a meeting joined by him, Tai, Lee Wing-tat (Democratic), Lee Cheuk-yan (Labour), and Wong Ho-ming (LSD). In a meeting, Tai labelled a majority in the Legislative Council as a "constitutional weapon of mass destruction" to force the resignation of the Chief Executive by vetoing the budget. He also considered establishing "a mechanism for citizens to participate", preferably through a referendum, to achieve the five demands in the protest movement. Au claimed he became an organiser after Lee's invitation, likely because he was once the leader of the pro-democracy coalition CHRF, wishing to contribute to the democratic movement. He said he was mainly responsible for administrative jobs including liaising and holding an election forum, while Tai handled the narrative works and Chiu was assisting the plan.

Au and Tai then met various democrats and in February and March in a series of briefings on the primaries plan. Parties were divided on the idea of vetoing the budget, while others did not express much interest in running in the unofficial election. Joshua Wong, according to Au, even urged him no need to be involved as he was about to study abroad.

According to Andrew Chiu, PfD was invited to advise on the primaries because of previous experience in organising primaries for legislative by-elections, later invited reluctantly by Tai to host the polls after pollster HKPORI declined. The recollection of PfD's involvement in the primaries differs between the other two witnesses. Chiu claimed the group officially accepted the invitation in May as he hoped the PfD would not be marginalised, but Ben Chung told the court that a meeting in February between Chiu, Chung, Tai, and ex-MP Fung Chi-wood had reached a consensus which PfD would co-ordinate and crowdfund the primaries.

Between March and July 2020, at least 16 coordination meetings for six constituencies (Kowloon East, Kowloon West, New Territories East, New Territories West, Hong Kong Island, District Council (Second)) were held, invited by Tai and joined by pro-democracy parties along with those interested to run in the upcoming general election. These meetings agreed to the holding of primaries and an election forum, settled on the target number of seats, and confirmed the leapfrog mechanism for disqualified candidates.

Au said in court that Tai introduced the concept of vetoing the budget in the coordination meetings. The "35+ Plan" (Chinese: 35+計劃) document prepared by Tai, without references to the veto power, was discussed starting in April. A "coordination agreement" file was then drafted by Tai, including the wording of "to actively use the power of Basic Law including vetoing the financial budget", described by Au as an "invention" by Tai to balance both sides. The notion to defeat the budget was contested during these meetings, as multiple participants were skeptical, but Tai sided with the localists as mentioned by Chiu. In New Territories East meeting, traditional democrats were criticised by localist Owen Chow for being skeptical. Eventually the agreement document for the New Territories East and West constituency adopted the wording of "to use" the veto power, while the other continued with "to actively use". Chiu believed this was a result of localist's pressure on the traditional democrats as the former back then was "very progressive".

Au said Tai announced "agreements had finally been reached" on the coordination of the six constituencies on 3 June. Replying to judge's question, Au believed it is fair to say consensuses between participants through the "coordination agreements". Chiu and Chung echoed Au, agreeing all coordination were completed by 9 June, the date for the press conference announcing the primaries, as the final version of the agreements were considered by Tai as the "consensuses" between candidates. Chiu added that such consensuses do not include actions after elected to the Legislative Council. These documents, however, were not publicised as organisers were concerned of potential disqualification by the authorities and the rumoured implementation of the national security law after Au and Chiu convinced Tai. Despite so, 37 localists and parties from the "resistance camp" signed an agreement (Chinese: 墨落無悔; lit. 'No Regret Upon Inked') vowing to veto the budget, which Chiu said was because of distrust between the two wings in the democracy movement. Kowloon East and New Territories West candidates submitted an additional, voluntary (disputed by Sze Tak-loy's attorney) "consensual principles" (Chinese: 共同綱領) document attached with nomination forms which was similar to the "coordination agreement". Chiu testified in court that Tai mentioned Joshua Wong and Eddie Chu advocated the submission, while some localists forced others to follow suit. Au admitted the organisers had already lost the authority to stop the localists, and revealed that Wu Chi-wai, chairman of Democratic Party, refrained from signing that document despite eventually giving in to pressure. But he agreed no candidates were publicly opposed to using the veto power.

During an election forum between 25 June and 4 July, the national security law was inserted into Hong Kong's legal system on 30 June. Tai texted candidates and said he believed the veto manifesto does not violate the new law and the primaries would go ahead.

On 3 July Apple Daily published a front-page advertisement by Gordon Ng, deemed by the prosecutors as one of the organisers, urging to support the primaries. Au said he does not know Ng, and had no idea he was one of the organisers. Chiu shared Au's view but thinks his "Say No to Primary Dodgers" campaign gives an impression of organising a party. Chiu, during testimony, said Tai once confirmed the campaign was not directly linked to the primaries, and claimed he was personally concerned Ng's petition might violate election laws.

Erick Tsang became the first official warning the unofficial poll could be in breach of the national security law on 9 July, two days before the start of the voting. After the end of the poll on 13 July, Chinese officials in Hong Kong condemned the "illegal" election. On the next day, Tai told candidates to avoid mentioning "paralysing the government". Au understood this as an act to avoid legal risk; Chiu said this showed Tai likely knew he crossed the line because he first said the legality as he understood was simply based on common law system but not Chinese continental law. The strong condemnation prompted Au, who claimed "doing his best to dismantle the primaries" and quit only because of its legality, Chiu, and Tai, to quit on 15 and 16 July. Chiu, in court, further remarked the primaries were "out of control" after the victorious resistance camp convened a press conference and promised mutual destruction after being elected to parliament.

Following the government's decision to postpone the election citing the emergency law, PfD continued to finish the follow-up administrative works. Chiu said he had met Tai later that year, when Tai believed the worst was already over without giving up hope on vetoing the budget. Under the initial plan, the PfD would ask the HKPORI to commission an opinion poll on strategic voting, with results released a week before the general election. Another opinion poll would also be commissioned for the proposed veto manifesto, an idea from Tai after the election postponement to exert pressure on the traditional moderates.

The democrats were charged and detained after February 2021. Chiu confirmed in court that he had been helping the police's investigation by June 2021, while Au did so three months later.

==== Ideologies ====
In addition to recall the history of timelines, Au and Chiu, in addition, elaborated their interpretation and views on "lam chau" doctrine and "resistance camp".

Au said a considerable size of participants believed forcing the Chief Executive to stand down through voting down the budget involved a degree of "lam chau" idea. Au described the "resistance camp" is in the "progressive" wing of the pro-democracy spectrum, naming Winnie Yu as a member of the camp, Owen Chow as "localist", and Gwyneth Ho with some "left-wing ideologies". In general, Au and Chiu agreed Kalvin Ho (ADPL) is a moderate, traditional democrat; Lam Cheuk-ting and Helena Wong (both Democratic) are relatively China-friendly, moderate, traditional democrats; both Raymond Chan (People Power) and Leung Kwok-hung (LSD) are progressive democrats but not radical; while William Or (Community Alliance) was also a moderate, but was not a reason for his heavy defeat in the primaries; Tat Cheng and Lee Yue-shun (Civic) are not radicals despite their party joined the "resistance camp".

Au said the pro-democracy camp was divided in two groups, one advocating negotiations by winning a majority in the chamber, another pushed for "lam chau" to force the government to concede and to break the impasse in despair.

During the protest the concept of unity between the radicals and moderates (Chinese: 和勇不分) emerged, Au explained "radicals" referred to those participated in riots and threw Molotov cocktails whilst "moderates" joined in peaceful rallies, and that the bonding in-between extended the protest movement.

When asked by the judge, Chiu said "localists" focus on local cultures and values but do not go as far as advocating independence, but the "anti-government" "resistance camp" only formed after the primaries and were unsatisfied with the traditional democrats.

Mike Lam, who first announced running in indirectly elected Import and Export constituency but changed his mind to run in New Territories East for the primary, said his decision was made due to "corrupted system" of the functional constituencies. Lam eventually returned to the Import and Export election after losing the primaries.

==== Divided with Tai ====
Explicitly pointing out the disagreement between him and Tai over the veto manifesto, Au and Chiu said their missions and wishes were to co-ordinate their colleagues to achieve a majority in the legislative election, but not to bundle the candidates to block the budget or to advocate "lam chau", while Tai was focusing on the veto power after securing the control of parliament. Au insisted the veto manifesto is never part of the plan to secure a legislative primary, but Tai was "hard-selling" the manifesto. He trashed his "lam chau" plan as a "final fantasy", "unrealistic", and "apocalyptic", and labelled the coordination process in the latter stage of the primaries is "undemocratic" and "infighting". Having first read the plan only after the Chinese officials denounced the poll, Chiu thought the plan would lead to a "nuclear explosion-like" end.

Au also agreed even the concept of "five demands", which primaries' candidates were asked to agree, was not clearly defined, and he personally does not believe all demands could be achieved, neither is the "35+" plan for majority. Au analysed that the pro-democracy camp has been "fragmentated" since 2016 without commanding force, not even Tai himself, and that all democrats would vote in bloc after a victorious election is only a "hypothesis" proposed by Tai, but not a "shared vision". Au agreed the "constitutional weapon" is "flawed" as the views of members representing the functional constituencies, which were representing the interests of professionals and businesses and also targets of the "35+" plan, were not fully considered. The blueprint of sweeping into power after controlling the parliament is, in Au's words, a "joke" as Hong Kong is in an "executive-led" system.

Chiu recalled Tai's effort to shore up "constitutional confrontation" as early as 2018 wishing no candidates in the next year's local elections would be elected unopposed, which led to the emergence of localists, populists, and political novices. He was particularly enraged by Tai's "irresponsible" article in April that ensued the vetoing of budget after winning a majority without any consensuses between the democrats, saying Tai acted like "the sole leader of Hong Kong's pro-democracy camp". Chiu, who agreed there is resentment with Tai, added that, in hindsight, PfD would not agree to hold the primaries had he read the commentary.

Chung believed it is "rather challenging" for the democracy movement to win the control of parliament in the election because of PR voting method, considering the vote share of the camp did not significantly increased in the 2019 local elections, but Tai was "very optimistic" on securing the desired seats.

Nevertheless, Chiu's testimony, which Chiu requested to amend and clarify on few occasions during the trial, was repeatedly questioned by the justice panel. For one instance, Chiu said wording of "liberate Hong Kong" and "suppress Hong Kong communist regime" on PfD's website was drafted by his colleagues. Chiu also claimed PfD or himself were "overridden" by Tai, but the judge said these were not recorded in any documents, even a report of PfD after the primary thanked the two coordinators. In defense, Chiu said those were drafted by PfD Secretary-general Luke Lai King-fai, who also minuted the coordination meeting. Trevor Beel, representing Gwyneth Ho, grilled Chiu for his credibility for pretending to be a moderate, but was interrupted by the judge who reminded him for possible adverse impact. Chiu then strongly disagreed with those accusations. Chung's statement in court regarding Ho were twice furiously denied by Ho herself.

==== Anonymous video ====
On the second day of the trial, a video was played in courtroom showing a closed-door meeting held in May 2020, attended by Benny Tai and other democrats, when Tai suggested launching the primary election and other details of the plan, including indiscriminate rejection of the budget and not running for election after losing the primary election. The prosecution also pointed out that Benny Tai regarded the pursuit of achieving the "35+" majority in the Legislative Council as a means to achieve the five demands and a strategy of mutual destruction, which eventually led to the government shutdown and Western sanctions on China. As the footage was shaky and shot below a table, with the camera pointing towards Tai from time to time, questions arise over who recorded the video.

The recorder of the video later testified anonymously in court during the fourteenth week of hearing, only to be identified as Mr. X. Points Media, formed by overseas Hongkongers, identified Kim Chan, once joined pro-Beijing party DAB, as the recorder. Chan's attendance in the meeting was confirmed by ex-District Councillor Michael Mo. The attorneys of defendants also confirmed the rumour.

"Mr. X" testified that Tai first mentioned the idea of triggering a government shutdown by vetoing the budget between December 2019 and January 2020. He was invited by Leung Ka-shing of People's Power to sit in a coordination meeting, and decided to record it because he suspected Tai's idea could be illegal and the footage could allow him to "study" further. When asked why the video was shaky, Mr. X insisted he publicly recorded without hiding. He anonymously sent the videos and recordings to the police in September and October 2020, and started assisting the police in April 2021. "Mr. X", a former secretary to a pro-Beijing member, said he sometimes support the pro-democracy camp while sometimes does not, but denied recording the meeting upon other's request.

==== Other witnesses ====
Other than the four defendants testifying against fellow democrats and "Mr. X", the prosecution also summoned other witnesses. New Territories East returning officer Amy Yeung Wai-sum, who invalidated Gwyneth Ho's nomination, said officials of Constitutional Affairs Bureau provided Facebook posts of Ho during political screening. She said the disqualification letter was drafted by others and signed by her.

A police officer from the national security department confirmed a Facebook account with pseudo-name was shared by national security cops. She agreed a comment posted by this account under one of the Tai's post, which reads "you will reap what you sow even you didn't break the law!!", was intended to provoke other responses. One national security police said he does not know what is Tai's "lam chau plan" even though arresting Gwyneth Ho for attempting to achieve the plan. Three other cops confirmed Apple Daily, Stand News, and Independent Media handed in documents related to advertisement of the primaries as ordered by the law enforcement.

=== Prosecutor's controversy ===
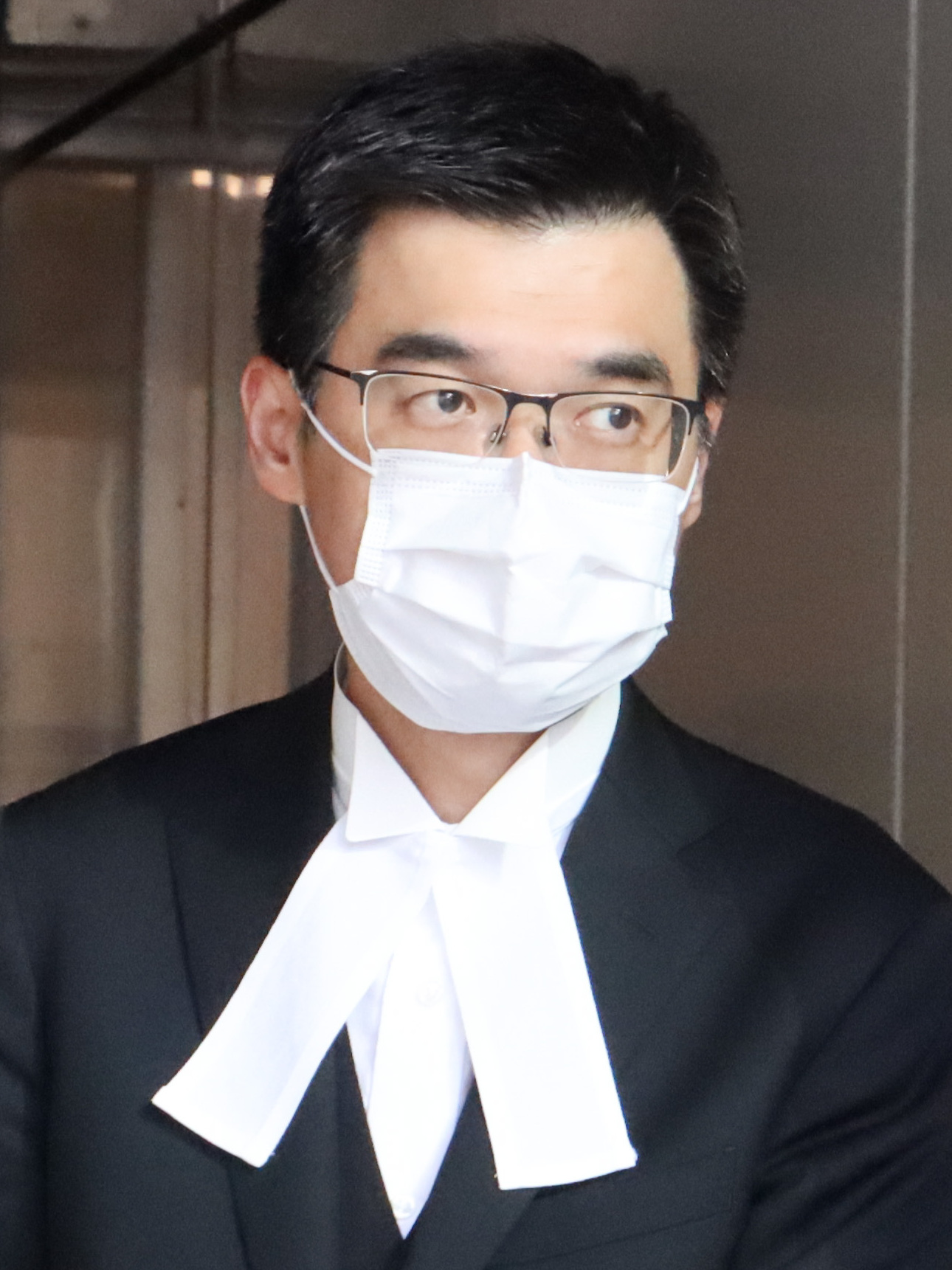
Anthony Chau, leading prosecutor of the case

The leading prosecutor, Anthony Chau, was repeatedly questioned by the judges in court.

The co-conspirator rule was applied by the prosecution to charge the defendants. Under the legal principle, statements made outside court by an alleged co-conspirator to another can be admitted as evidence against all involved so to establish the existence of a conspiracy and the roles of those involved. In the third week of trial, the prosecution argued any comments by any defendants could be evidence, but was challenged by judge. A 25-page list of evidences against all defendants was submitted to the judges in the fourth week, including websites or posts of individual activists and political parties. The prosecution affirmed an agreement between Au and Tai was made on 15 February 2020 after an article on plan of getting a parliamentary majority was published, before the security law was enacted.

In the eighth week the prosecutors accused two individuals whose names did not appear in the indictment nor arrested as co-conspirators, then Kwun Tong District Council chairman Choy Chak-hung, who was involved in the coordination, and Luke Lai. A judge was dismayed at prosecution for not showing a list of co-conspirators after weeks of trial. Lai, a witness for prosecution, left Hong Kong for the UK in July 2021, therefore suspected by Michael Mo as another police informant. Dennis Kwok, former MP (Civic) was listed as a conspirator in the tenth week.

After playing a total of 7 hours of video of election forum and press conferences, the prosecutors intended to show other footages, only to be stopped by judges for wasting time. The questioning technique was attacked by the three justices for not following chronological order, lack of basis, meaning, and appropriateness.

On the 50th day of the trial, the prosecution revealed Ben Chung's mobile phone was finally unlocked thanks to technological advancement. The judge expressed discontent and concerned the potential delay caused by the new development.

=== Paid court goers ===
Hundreds of people had lined up outside the court before the start, vying for tickets allocated for the public to sit in the main court room. Some of those waiting said they did not know what case they were waiting for, while some filmed journalists. A group of women who had obtained tickets were later seen leaving before the hearing commenced.

Hong Kong Free Press noted that some people who waited in line to attend the trial were potentially paid, and did not attend the trial after receiving a ticket. A family member of a defendant said "It is obvious that someone is trying to stop the general public from observing the case." InMedia reporters, operating undercover, were paid HK$800 to spend the night queuing for tickets; multiple groups, some with pro-government links, were suspected to be coordinating payments to people to queue and obtain tickets.

== Verdict and sentence ==
On 30 May 2024, 14 of 47 activists were convicted and found guilty while two activists were acquitted: Lawrence Lau and Lee Yue-shun. The convicted were remanded until their sentencing.^{[139]} The remaining 31 activists agreed to plead guilty. On 13 June, the Department of Justice announced that it would appeal against the acquittal of Lau but not that of Lee.

On 19 November 2024, the 45 convicted activists were handed down prison sentences between 4 and 10 years by the High Court. The three presiding judges said Tai is a "principal offender", which have a starting point of 15 years' imprisonment under the law, for not only initiating the scheme but also organising the primary election as "the mastermind behind". His sentences was reduced for one-third after pleading guilty. Au, Chiu, and Chung, the three organisers who turned prosecution witnesses, was applied with starting points of 12 to 15 years in prison, but was granted sentencing discounts of 49 to 55 per cent.

Results of trial
Name	Verdict	Sentence	Released on
Benny Tai Yiu-ting	Pleaded guilty	10 years	Expected 2032
Owen Chow Ka-shing	Found guilty	7 years, 9 months	Expected 2032
Gordon Ng Ching-hang	Found guilty	7 years, 3 months	Expected 2028
Gwyneth Ho Kwai-lam	Found guilty	7 years	Expected 2028
Andrew Chiu Ka-yin	Pleaded guilty	7 years	27 October 2025
Lam Cheuk-ting	Found guilty	6 years, 9 months	Expected 2030
Leung Kwok-hung	Found guilty	6 years, 9 months	Expected 2029
Winnie Yu Wai-ming	Found guilty	6 years, 9 months	Expected 2028
Au Nok-hin	Pleaded guilty	6 years, 9 months	Expected 2028
Ricky Or Yiu-lam	Found guilty	6 years, 7 months	Expected 2030
Kalvin Ho Kai-ming	Found guilty	6 years, 7 months	Expected 2030
Sze Tak-loy	Found guilty	6 years, 7 months	Expected 2030
Cheng Tat-hung	Found guilty	6 years, 6 months	Expected 2030
Clarisse Yeung Suet-ying	Found guilty	6 years, 6 months	Expected 2030
Michael Pang Cheuk-kei	Found guilty	6 years, 6 months	Expected 2030
Helena Wong Pik-wan	Found guilty	6 years, 6 months	Expected 2030
Raymond Chan Chi-chuen	Found guilty	6 years, 6 months	Expected 2030
Ben Chung Kam-lun	Pleaded guilty	6 years, 1 months	Expected 2027
Ng Kin-wai	Pleaded guilty	5 years, 7 months	25 September 2026
Mike Lam King-nam	Pleaded guilty	5 years, 2 months	Expected 2030
Alvin Yeung Ngok-kiu	Pleaded guilty	5 years, 1 months	28 March 2026
Fergus Leung Fong-wai	Pleaded guilty	4 years, 11 months	27 January 2026
Sam Cheung Ho-sum	Pleaded guilty	4 years, 11 months	27 January 2026
Andrew Wan Siu-kin	Pleaded guilty	4 years, 8 months	4 July 2026
Joshua Wong Chi-fung	Pleaded guilty	4 years, 8 months	Expected 2027
Lester Shum Ngo-fai	Pleaded guilty	4 years, 6 months	26 January 2026
Tam Tak-chi	Pleaded guilty	4 years, 5 months	Expected 2027
Wu Chi-wai	Pleaded guilty	4 years, 5 months	30 June 2026
Eddie Chu Hoi-dick	Pleaded guilty	4 years, 5 months	15 January 2026
Prince Wong Ji-yuet	Pleaded guilty	4 years, 5 months	Expected 2028
Ventus Lau Wing-hong	Pleaded guilty	4 years, 5 months	Expected 2028
Frankie Fung Tat-chun	Pleaded guilty	4 years, 5 months	28 July 2025
Nathan Lau Chak-fung	Pleaded guilty	4 years, 5 months	28 July 2025
Carol Ng Man-yee	Pleaded guilty	4 years, 5 months	28 July 2025
Tiffany Yuen Ka-wai	Pleaded guilty	4 years, 3 months	19 August 2025
Roy Tam Hoi-pong	Pleaded guilty	4 years, 3 months	30 May 2025
Jimmy Sham Tsz-kit	Pleaded guilty	4 years, 3 months	30 May 2025
Kinda Li Ka-tat	Pleaded guilty	4 years, 3 months	30 May 2025
Henry Wong Pak-yu	Pleaded guilty	4 years, 3 months	30 May 2025
Hendrick Lui Chi-hang	Pleaded guilty	4 years, 3 months	Expected 2028
Andy Chui Chi-kin	Pleaded guilty	4 years, 2 months	27 October 2025
Claudia Mo Man-ching	Pleaded guilty	4 years, 2 months	29 April 2025
Jeremy Jansen Tam Man-ho	Pleaded guilty	4 years, 2 months	29 April 2025
Kwok Ka-ki	Pleaded guilty	4 years, 2 months	29 April 2025
Gary Fan Kwok-wai	Pleaded guilty	4 years, 2 months	29 April 2025
Lee Yue-shun	Not guilty		30 May 2024 (acquitted)
Lawrence Lau Wai-chung	Not guilty		30 May 2024 (acquitted)

== Reactions ==
=== Domestic ===
On the day of the sentencing, Secretary for Security Chris Tang said during the press conference that the overall sentencing has already reflected the severity of the offence and he wanted to look into individual cases to see if there is any need to review the case. Tang also said the sentences reflect the severity of the offenses and the national security helps safeguard the city's prosperity, so his government takes any violations of the law seriously.

Chief Executive John Lee said that the court confirmed that the offence of the defendants was extremely serious and they should be severely punished and the case shows that anyone who intends to subvert state power and endanger national security will ultimately be punished in accordance with the law. The government issued a press release stating that the defendants led by Benny Tai are investing a great deal of time and money in premeditating and planning the so-called primary election, which showed that they had a long-term plan to make the scheme a success, and all the defendants who participated in the primary election played an essential role in the whole scheme.

=== China ===
The State Council's Hong Kong and Macau Affairs Office (HKMAO) said in a commentary on 25 November 2024 that Tai and others were “far from being genuine advocates” for democracy. Rather they were its “true destructors” as they had promoted a plan that would have betrayed the country and harmed the interests of Hongkongers, it said.

=== Foreign ===
The United States "strongly condemns" the verdict, saying the activists were "aggressively prosecuted and jailed" under "politically motivated prosecutions" for normal political activity protected under the Basic Law. The European Union said it was deeply concerned about "another unprecedented blow against fundamental freedoms", warning it could further undermine confidence in the rule of law. The United Kingdom said the sentencing clearly shows the security law was used to criminalise political dissent.

Amnesty International Hong Kong criticized the Court of Appeal for rejecting the appeals of 12 defendants in the "Hong Kong 47" case, calling the charges politically motivated. The group condemned the use of "Article 23" to deny early release on vague "national security" grounds. Amnesty called for the immediate release of all convicted individuals, asserting peaceful opposition is not a crime.

Japanese Chief Cabinet Secretary Yoshimasa Hayashi said during the press conference that the Japanese government expressed serious concern for the situation that undermines the one country, two systems framework. He called on the Chinese government and Hong Kong authorities to respect the rights and freedoms of Hong Kong citizens, while working closely with the international community to exert strong pressure.

== Appeals ==
In the weeks following sentencing, 13 of the 45 democrats announced that they had lodged appeals. Twelve, who had pleaded not guilty, are appealing both sentence and conviction, namely: Owen Chow, Helena Wong, Clarisse Yeung, Winnie Yu, Lam Cheuk Ting, Gordon Ng, Michael Pang, Gwyneth Ho, Raymond Chan, Tat Cheng, Kalvin Ho, and Leung Kwok Hung. Tam Tak-chi, who pled guilty, is appealing his sentence.

== Release ==
The first batch of defendants were released in the early morning on 29 April 2025 after serving four years and two months in prison. Gary Fan left Shek Pik Prison, while Kwok Ka-ki and Jeremy Tam was freed from Stanley Prison, and Claudia Mo from Lo Wu Correctional Institution. They were believed to have been accompanied by the police when they boarded vehicles. Fan said he is going to reunite with family and thanked the care from Hongkongers and the media when he was seen returning to his home with the police. SCMP sources suggested they would remain low-key and decline media interviews. The second batch saw four more were released on 30 May with a similar arrangement, namely Jimmy Sham, Li Ka-tat, Roy Tam and Wong Pak-yu. Another three were released on the morning of 28 July, namely Frankie Fung, Nathan Lau and Carol Ng. On 19 August, Tiffany Yuen was released. On 27 October, two more defendants were released, namely Chui Chi-kin and Andrew Chiu. Chiu was granted early release for his good behaviour.

The fifth batch saw four more were released in January 2026 with a similar arrangement, namely Eddie Chu, Lester Shum, Fergus Leung and Sam Cheung were released from Stanley Prison and Shek Pik Prison, respectively. On 28 March, Alvin Yeung was released from Stanley Prison. On 30 June and 4 July, Wu Chi-wai and Andrew Wan were released from Stanley Prison. On 25 September, Ng Kin-wai was released from Shek Pik Prison.

== See also ==
- 2020 Hong Kong Legislative Council mass resignations
- 2021 Hong Kong electoral changes
  - Patriots administering Hong Kong
- List of Hong Kong national security cases
