= Owen Chow =

Hong Kong political activist (b. 1997)

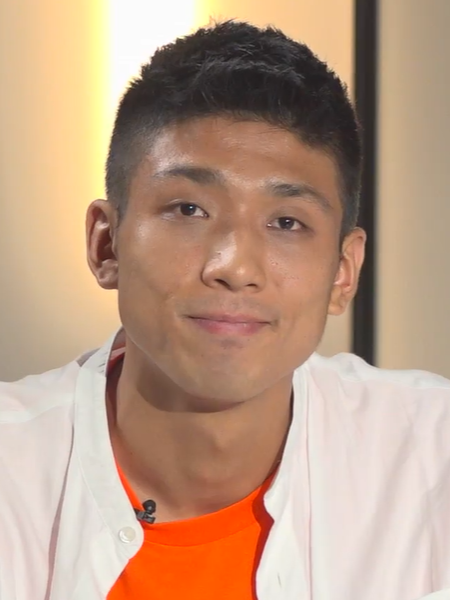
Owen Chow in the 2020 pro-democracy primaries debate

Owen Chow Ka-shing (Chinese: 鄒家成; born 10 February 1997) is a Hong Kong localist camp activist. He was a 2019 District Council election candidate in Tai Wai and ran in the pro-democracy primaries for the 2020 Legislative Council election with the slogan "reject colonisers, national resistance against tyranny" in New Territories East.

== Biography ==
Born on 10 February 1997, Chow studied for a degree in nursing. He was heavily involved in the 2019 anti-extradition protests and said he was on the very front line of the protest. In the 2019 District Council election, he ran in Tai Wai, one of the few constituencies where more than one pro-democrat was running against each other. He lost in the four-way contest against pro-Beijing Democratic Alliance for the Betterment and Progress of Hong Kong (DAB) incumbent Kelly Tung and Democratic Party candidate Ng Ting-lam, receiving only 748 votes. Chow accused the Democratic Party for not showing up in the district until the very late stage but was also being accused of splitting the votes.

In the pro-democracy primaries for the 2020 Legislative Council election, Chow ran in New Territories East with the slogan "reject colonisers, national resistance against tyranny", becoming one of the most radical platforms in the primaries. He deleted the words "Hong Kong nation" and "colonial" in his election advertisements after the passing of the Hong Kong national security law on 30 June 2020 which criminalises "separatism, subversion, terrorism and foreign interference", mocking the chilling effect of the new law had created. He ended up winning 16,758 votes and came fifth in New Territories East, securing the nomination to run in the general election.

On 6 January 2021, Chow was among 53 members of the pro-democratic camp who were arrested under the national security law, specifically its provision regarding alleged subversion. The group stood accused of the organisation of and participation in unofficial primary elections held by the camp in July 2020. Chow was released on bail on 7 January.

On 28 February 2021, Chow was charged, along with 46 others, for subversion. He was detained in prison until 22 June, when he was released on bail, after his bail application was granted by High Court judge Esther Toh. According to a written judgement that was released by the judiciary on 12 August, Toh granted bail to enable Chow to finish his nursing degree, and due to her belief that he had not explicitly called for Hong Kong independence during the primaries. On 12 January 2022, Chow was re-arrested and the following day, had his bail revoked, following a court ruling that he had broken his bail conditions and endangered national security through online postings of an inciteful nature which related to the 2019 Prince Edward station attack and the 2019 Yuen Long attack.

On 16 March 2024, Chow was sentenced to 61 months and 15 days in prison for rioting over his participation in the 2019 Storming of the Legislative Council Complex. He had pleaded guilty.

On 30 May 2024, Chow was found guilty of subversion in the primary elections case, along with 13 other defendants.

== See also ==
- List of Chinese pro-democracy activists
