= 2020 Hong Kong pro-democracy primaries =

- 11–12 July 2020

26 lists for Geographical Constituencies 5 lists for Functional Constituencies
- Turnout: 606,761 (13.62%)
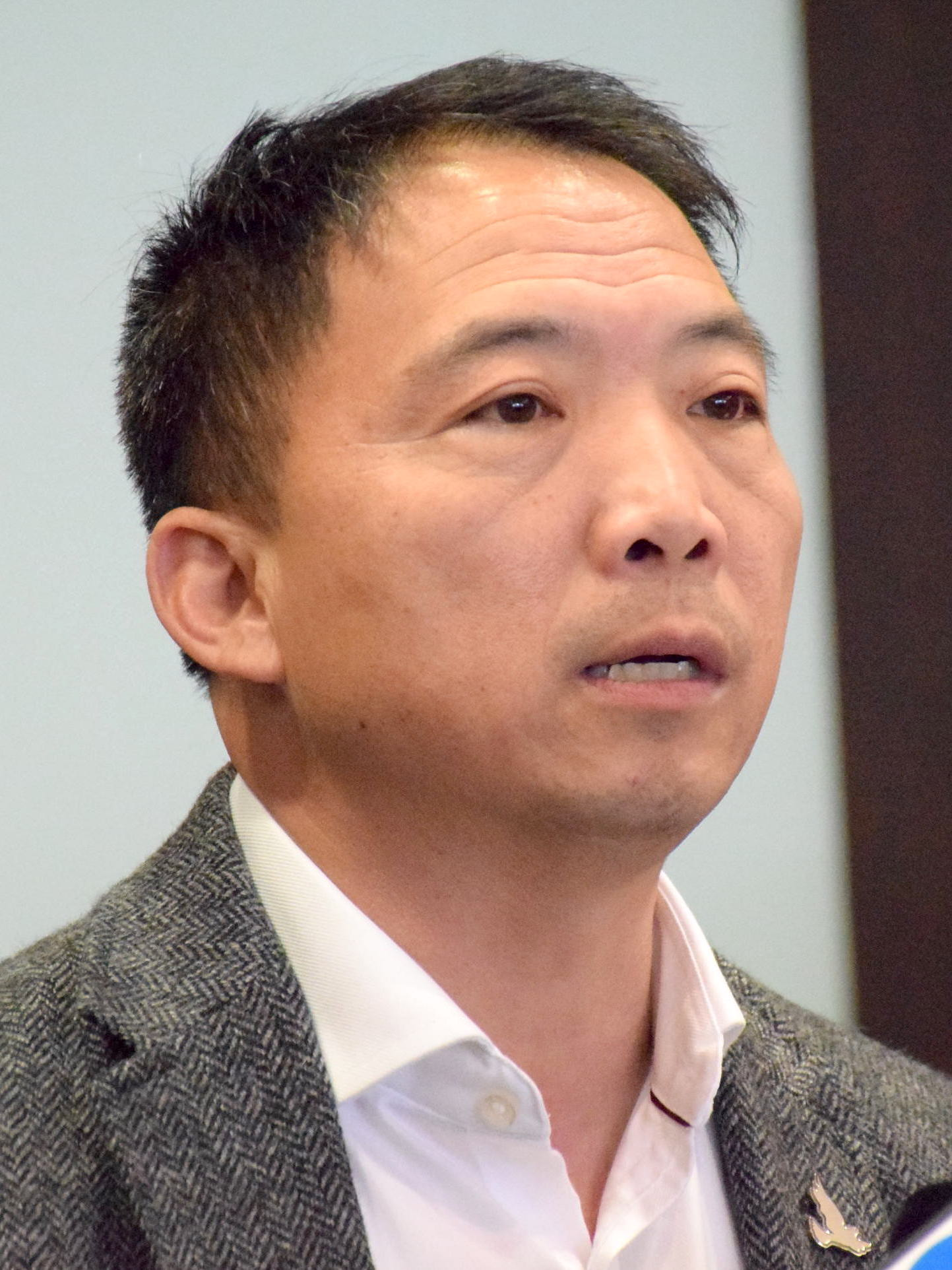

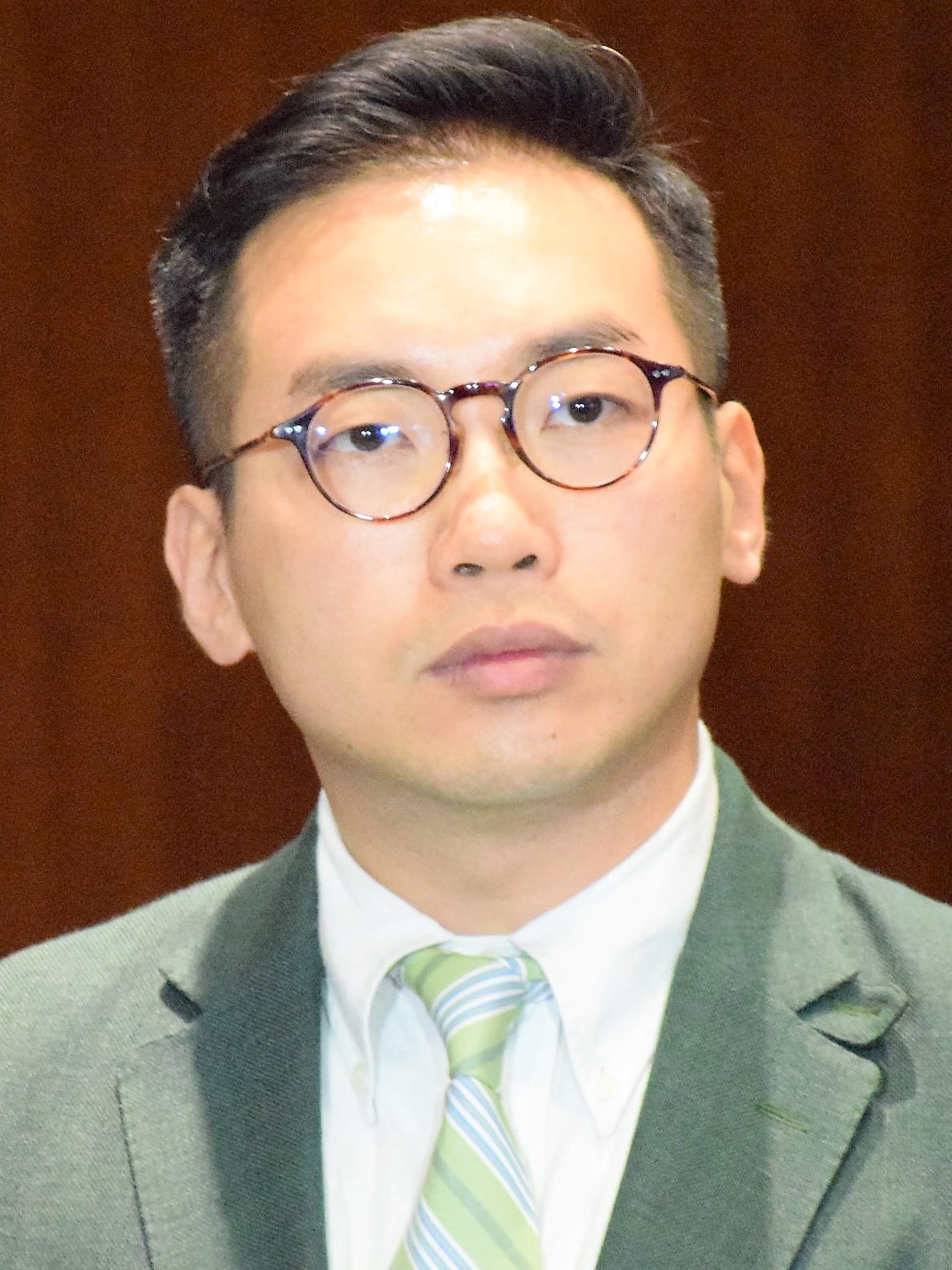

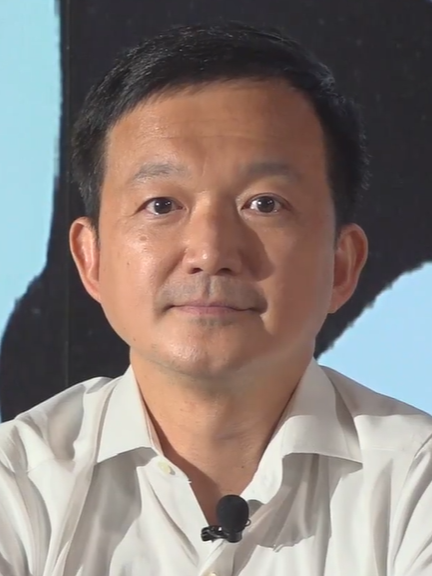

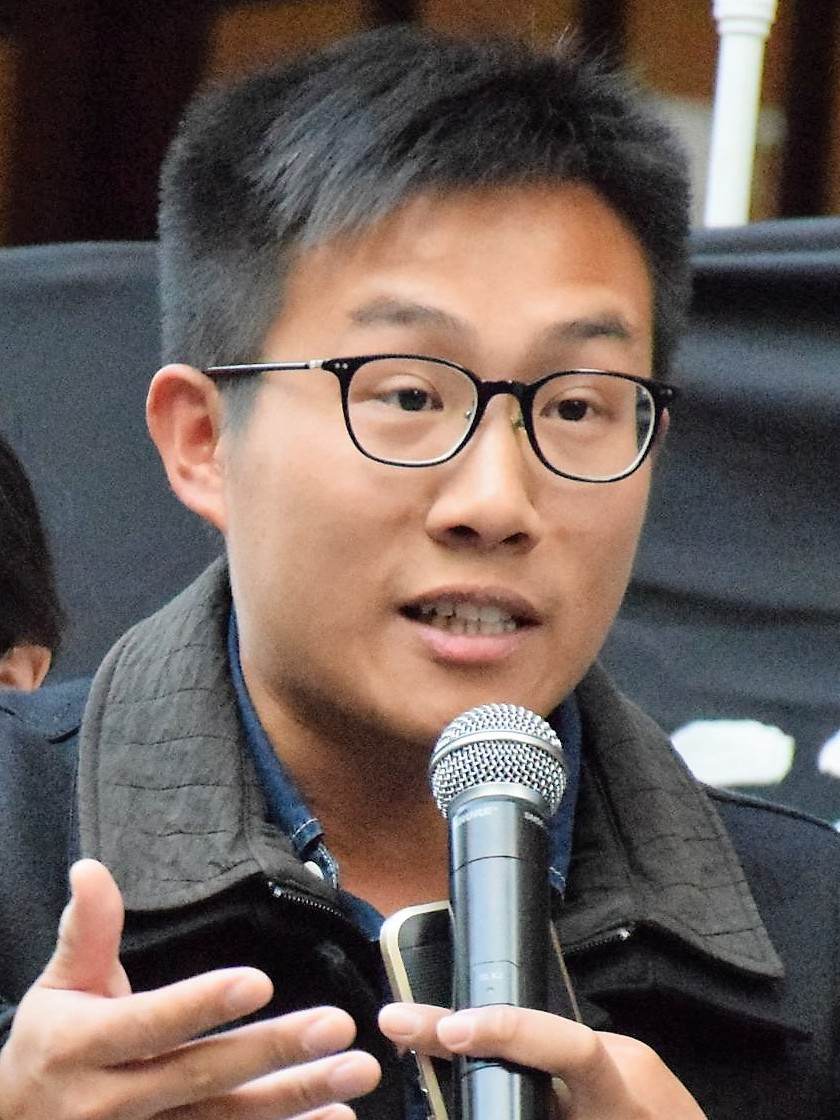

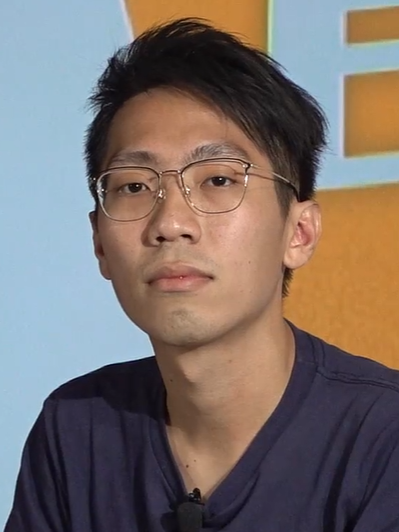

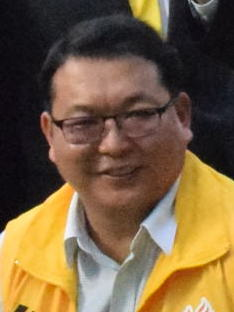

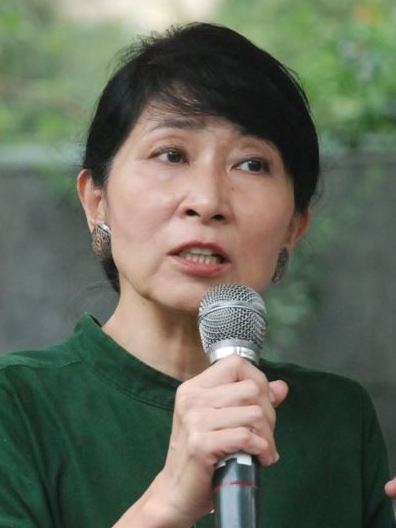

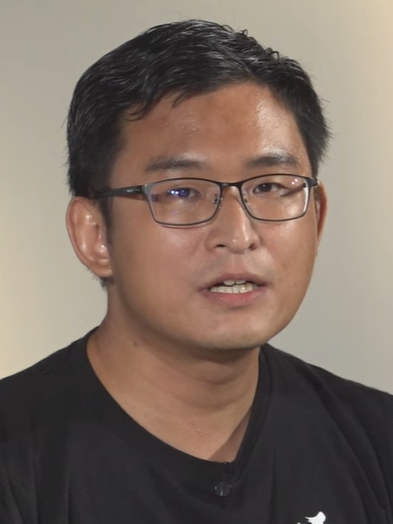
	First party	Second party	Third party
Leader	Wu Chi-wai	Alvin Yeung	Ray Chan
Party	Democratic	Civic	People Power
Popular vote	77,251	73,054	28,081
Percentage	12.78%	12.08%	4.64%
Lists won	6	4	2
	Fourth party	Fifth party	Sixth party
Leader	Gary Poon	Raphael Wong	Ng Kin-wai and others
Party	TMCN	LSD	TSW Connection
Popular vote	35,513	34,962	20,525
Percentage	5.87%	5.78%	3.39%
Lists won	1	1	1
	Seventh party	Eighth party	Ninth party
Leader	Yam Kai-bong and others	Claudia Mo	Sze Tak-loy
Party	Neo Democrats	HK First	ADPL
Popular vote	15,021	9,308	8,776
Percentage	2.48%	1.54%	1.45%
Lists won	1	1	1

The 2020 Hong Kong pro-democracy primaries were held on 11 and 12 July 2020 for selecting the numbers of pro-democracy candidates for the subsequently postponed 2020 Legislative Council election to maximise the chance for the pro-democrats to achieve a majority in the 70-seat Legislative Council.

With a turnout of more than 600,000, which equals to nearly half of votes received by the pro-democracy camp in the 2016 general election, it was the most-participated primary held in the history of Hong Kong, despite the SAR government's threats of the organisers' potential breaching of the newly imposed national security law.

Traditional pro-democrat parties lost ground to the localist new faces, with an unofficial six-person alliance led by Joshua Wong and Nathan Law of the disbanded Demosistō becoming the biggest winner in the primaries. The candidates they endorsed also emerged as either top or runner-up candidates in their respective constituencies.

55 candidates and participants were arrested under the national security law on 6 January 2021, of which 47 were officially charged with conspiracy to commit subversion.

== Background ==
In 2019 amid the historic anti-extradition protests and the pro-democracy landslide in the District Council elections, legal scholar Benny Tai, one of the initiators of the 2014 Occupy protests, put forward a plan for the pro-democrats to win a majority of the seats in the Legislative Council to block the government's bills including the expected legislation of the Article 23 of the Basic Law which would in turn put pressure on the government to implement the five key demands of the protest movement. Based on prior experience, where excessive numbers of candidates split the pro-democratic votes in the 2016 election, he proposed a primary election within the pro-democracy camp to maximise the chance for the pro-democrats to win more seats by setting a limit on the numbers of candidates and avoid wasting votes. Then, Benny Tai expects those elected legislative councillors to execute so-called "10 steps to burn with us", veto the Hong Kong SAR government's Budget bill without any reason, making a constitutional crisis and forcing the resignation of the Hong Kong SAR Chief Executive.

== Mechanism ==
To be eligible for the primaries, each candidate had to obtain at least 100 registered voter nominations and pay a deposit of HK$10,000. The election, organised by Benny Tai and former Legislative Council member Au Nok-hin, coordinated by Power for Democracy, was set to take place from 11 to 12 July between 9 am and 9 pm. The voting system was designed by the Hong Kong Public Opinion Research Institute (PORI), which also conducted polls on the recommended candidates. The surveyed results would be used to consolidate the final list of nominees for each seat in the official election in September. Voters were required to submit proof of residency or electoral register identification, and bring a smartphone to designated polling stations where they would scan the QR code and fill out their personal details to vote.

== Nominations ==
A total of 52 nomination lists were received during the nomination period for all five geographical constituencies, the five-seat District Council (Second) and Health Services functional constituency. Most potential candidates pledged their willingness to coordinate with organisers, except for political party Civic Passion and New Territories East candidate Law Ting-fai who declined to join the primaries.

The Kwai Chung-based small political group Neighbourhood and Worker's Service Centre (NWSC) which held one seat in the legislature also declared they would not follow the agreement in which a losing candidate in the primaries would not participate in the general election. Instead, the NWSC suggested it may drop out in the latter stage if the poll numbers suggested the candidate had no chance of winning. There was a backlash among the pro-democrats towards the NWSC, which was accused of undermining the mechanism of the primaries. The NWSC later withdrew their candidacy altogether and stated that they would not field any candidate in the general election.

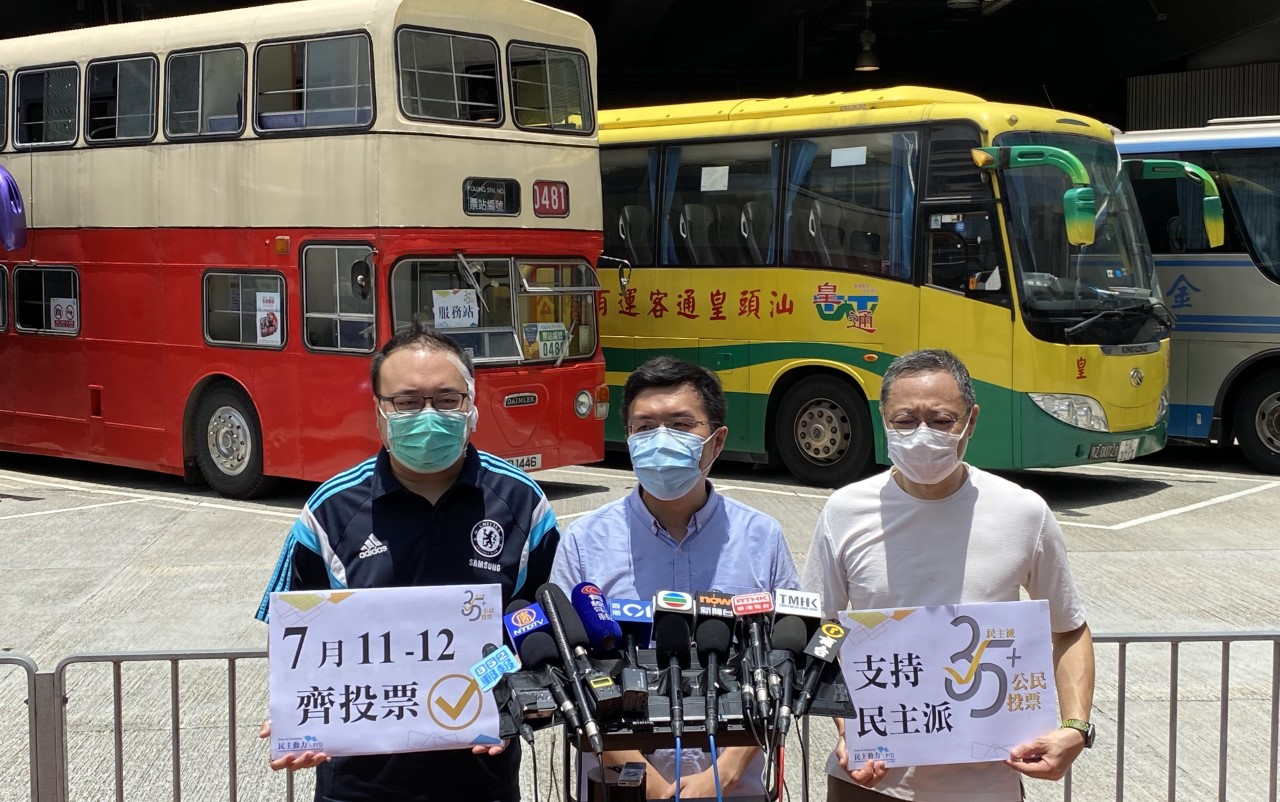
Organisers Andrew Chiu, Au Nok-hin and Benny Tai launched the primaries in front of a bus-setting polling station on 11 July.

Number of nominations in each constituency
Constituency	No. of nominations		Target seats	Total seats
Constituency	Primaries	General	Target seats	Total seats
Hong Kong Island	8	4	4	6
Kowloon West	9	4	4	6
Kowloon East	6	5	3	5
New Territories West	8	6	6	9
New Territories East	12	7	6–7	9
District Council (Second)	5	4	3–4	5
Health Services	4	1	1	1
TOTAL	52	31	27–29	41

== Security law and legal threats ==
On 30 June, the National People's Congress Standing Committee (NPCSC) approved the final draft of the national security legislation for Hong Kong. Hours after the approval, leading members of pro-democracy group Demosistō Joshua Wong, Nathan Law, Agnes Chow and Jeffrey Ngo announced their departure from the party. Demosistō members had been repeatedly barred from standing for election with authorities citing their previous stance on "self-determination" for the city, of which Wong and Law were also running in the upcoming primaries as Demosistō members. Subsequently, Demosistō declared that it would disband after the mass resignations on the same day. Few days after, Nathan Law said he had fled Hong Kong in response to the security law. He later dropped out from the primaries and endorsed Tiffany Yuen.

Secretary for Constitutional and Mainland Affairs Erick Tsang warned that the primaries might violate the new Beijing-imposed national security law. Tsang said one of the objectives of the primaries was to win a majority of seats in the legislature and subsequently vote against the budget. He added this could contravene clauses in the new law prohibiting secession, subversion and collusion with foreign powers. Benny Tai refuted the claim by saying such advocacy work was in accordance with the principles of the Basic Law. He added that vetoing the budget would not constitute "seriously interfering in, disrupting, or undermining the performance of duties and functions" of the government under Article 22 of the new law because the chief executive has the power to dismiss the legislature and call a by-election.

On 10 July one day before the primaries, the Housing Authority sent out a mass letter saying all District Councillors were barred from using their offices as polling stations or for any purposes other than related to district council activities. It warned that action might be taken against the District Councillors who were found to have violated terms in their rental contracts. A pro-democracy ice cream shop also had to scrap the plan to become a polling station after the property managers warned their participation could violate the tenancy agreement. At night, Hong Kong Police raided the Public Opinion Research Institute (PORI) office in Wong Chuk Hang, accusing the organisation of dishonest use of a computer. Au Nok-hin said the police move was to suppress the weekend voting and cast a "deterrent effect" on organisers and supporters.

== Results ==
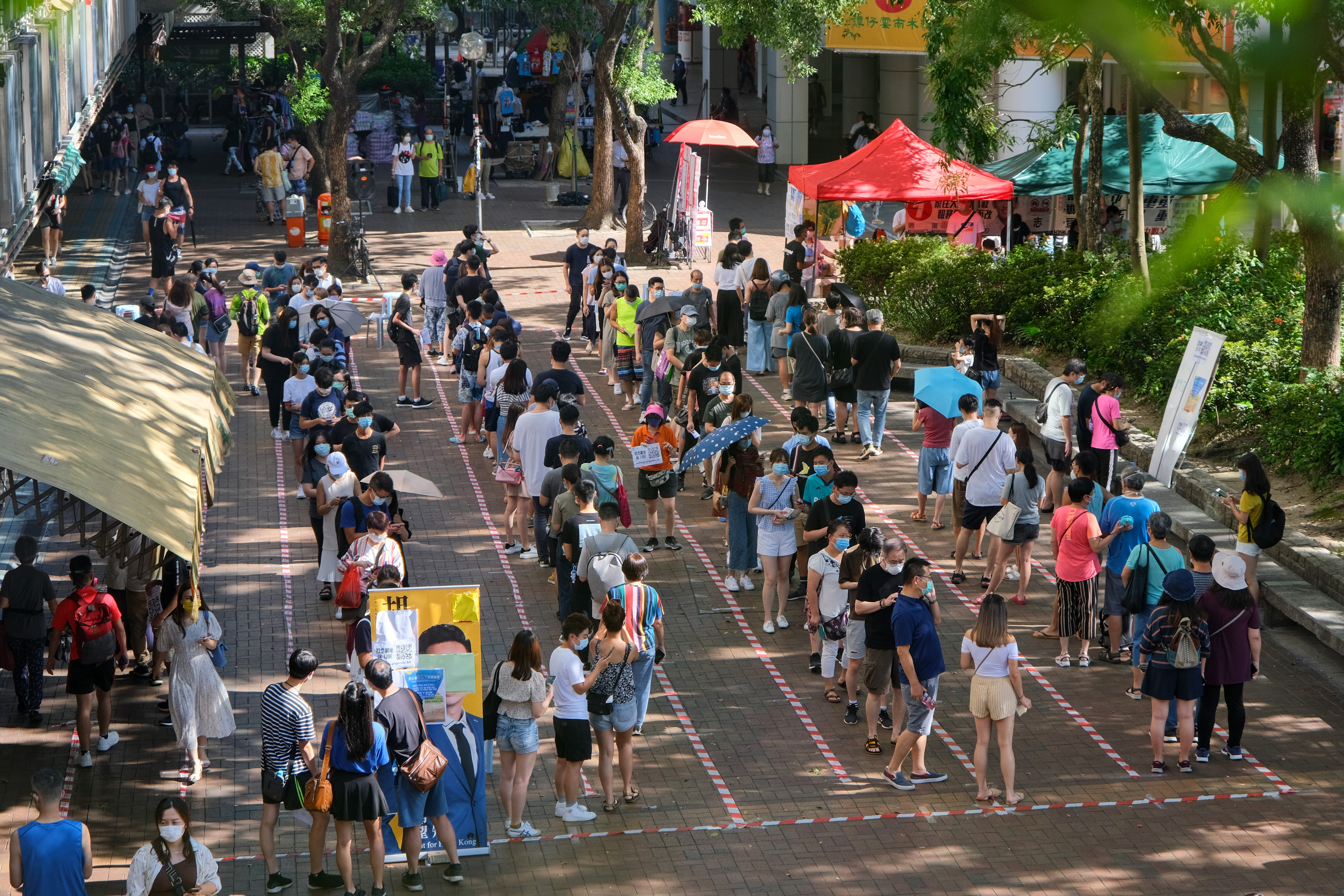
Long queue outside polling station at Tai Po Plaza on 12 July 2020.

Over 590,000 electronic ballots and more than 20,000 paper ballots were recorded throughout the two-day vote, more than 13 per cent of the total number of registered voters and far exceeding the organisers' expected turnout of 170,000. Despite the national security law and legal threats, "Hong Kong people have made history again – another miracle happened in Hong Kong," Benny Tai said. "Hong Kong people – after all these years, since 2003 – have demonstrated to the world, and also to the authorities, that we have not given up to strive for democracy."

Traditional parties lost ground in most of the direct constituencies to the localist new faces, with Democratic Party incumbent legislator Helena Wong only coming seventh in her Kowloon West constituency. Former legislator "Long Hair" Leung Kwok-hung of the League of Social Democrats managed only ninth place in New Territories East for which only the top seven candidates would run in the general election. Joseph Lee, incumbent legislator of the Health Services constituency lost to Winnie Yu of the labour union Hospital Authority Employees Alliance, which had launched a labour strike during the anti-extradition bill protests. Candidates from numerous small parties were wiped out, including Carol Ng from the Labour Party, who lost in New Territories West.

Localist candidates emerged as the new force in the primaries, with an unofficial six-person alliance led by former Demosistō secretary-general Joshua Wong, incumbent legislator Eddie Chu and endorsed by withdrawn candidate Nathan Law, all became either the top or runner-up candidate in their respective constituencies. Wong himself was the top candidate in Kowloon East, while Eddie Chu and former journalist Gwyneth Ho came first in New Territories West and New Territories East respectively. Tiffany Yuen who was endorsed by Nathan Law and activist Sunny Cheung also came in second in Hong Kong Island and Kowloon West respectively, while activist Lester Shum came in second in the District Council (Second) and Winnie Yu won the Health Services functional constituency.

Summary of the 11–12 July 2020 results of the pro-democracy primaries for the 2020 Legislative Council election
Political Affiliation	Geographical Constituencies				Functional Constituencies				Total elected
Political Affiliation	Popular vote	%	List	Elected	Popular vote	%	List	Elected	Total elected
Democratic Party	77,251	12.78	5	4	318,621	59.75	2	2	6
Civic Party	73,054	12.08	4	4	10,579	1.98	1	0	4
People Power	28,081	4.64	2	2	—	—	—	—	2
League of Social Democrats	34,962	5.78	2	1	—	—	—	—	1
Neo Democrats	15,021	2.48	2	1	—	—	—	—	1
HK First	9,308	1.54	1	1	—	—	—	—	1
Hong Kong Association for Democracy and People's Livelihood	8,776	1.45	2	1	—	—	—	—	1
Labour Party	10,860	1.80	1	0	—	—	—	—	0
Community Alliance	1,489	0.25	1	0	—	—	—	—	0
Professionals Guild	—	—	—	—	218	0.04	1	0	0
Independent democrats	—	—	—	—	54	0.01	1	0	0
Total for traditional democrats	258,802	42.80	20	14	329,472	61.78	5	2	16
Tuen Mun Community Network	35,513	5.87	1	1	—	—	—	—	1
Tin Shui Wai Connection	20,525	3.39	1	1	—	—	—	—	1
Peninsular Commons	7,671	1.27	1	0	—	—	—	—	0
Team Pang Cheuk-kei	2,880	0.48	1	0	—	—	—	—	0
Hospital Authority Employees Alliance	—	—	—	—	2,493	0.47	1	1	1
Independent localists	263,546	43.59	14	10	200,780	37.65	2	2	12
Total for localists	330,135	54.60	18	12	203,273	38.12	3	3	15
Chai Wan Startup	7,974	1.32	1	0	—	—	—	—	0
Non-aligned independents	7,749	1.28	3	0	516	0.10	1	0	0
Total	604,660	100.00	42	26	533,261	100.00	9	5	31
Total valid votes	604,660	99.65			533,261	100.00			
Invalid votes	2,101	0.35			—N/a	—			
Total votes / turnout	606,761	13.62			533,261	12.61			
Registered voters	4,455,331	100.00			4,228,096	100.00			

=== Geographical Constituencies ===
Hong Kong Island
List	Candidates	Votes	Of total (%)	± from prev.
Democratic	Hui Chi-fung, So Yat-hang	28,189	31.17	
Ind. democrat	Tiffany Yuen Ka-wai	19,844	21.94	
Independent	Fergus Leung Fong-wai	14,743	16.30	
Civic	Tat Cheng	11,090	12.26	
Chai Wan Startup	Chui Chi-kin	7,974	8.82	
Independent	Clarisse Yeung Suet-ying	5,707	6.31	
Team Pang	Pang Cheuk-kei, Ho Chi-wang, Clara Cheung, Li Wing-choi	2,880	3.18	
Total valid votes		90,427	100.00	
Rejected ballots		48		
Turnout		90,475	12.82	
Registered electors		705,525		

Kowloon West
List	Candidates	Votes	Of total (%)	± from prev.
LSD	Sham Tsz-kit	25,670	31.68	
Nonpartisan	Sunny Cheung Kwan-yang	16,992	20.97	
HK First	Claudia Mo	9,308	11.49	
ADPL	Kalvin Ho Kai-ming	7,791	9.62	
Peninsular Commons	Frankie Fung Tat-chun, Lee Hin-long	7,671	9.47	
Nonpartisan	Lau Wai-chung	6,295	7.77	
Democratic	Wong Pik-wan	4,718	5.82	
Independent	Lau Chak-fung	1,426	1.76	
Nonpartisan	Jeffrey Alterin Andrews	1,150	1.42	
Total valid votes		81,021	100.00	
Rejected ballots		143		
Turnout		81,164	13.51	
Registered electors		600,864		

Kowloon East
List	Candidates	Votes	Of total (%)	± from prev.
Independent	Joshua Wong Chi-fung (Note: Registered as Demosistō but quit the party on 30 June 2020 before the party dissolved itself on the same day.)	31,398	34.05	
Civic	Jeremy Tam Man-ho	23,244	25.20	
Localist	Li Ka-tat	15,194	16.48	
People Power	Tam Tak-chi	10,980	11.91	
Democratic	Wu Chi-wai	10,421	11.30	
ADPL	Sze Tak-loy	985	1.07	
Total valid votes		92,222	100.00	
Rejected ballots		221		
Turnout		92,443	13.05	
Registered electors		708,348		

New Territories West
List	Candidates	Votes	Of total (%)	± from prev.
Nonpartisan	Eddie Chu Hoi-dick, Eddie Chan Shu-fai, Fung Siu-yin, Wong Pit-man	49,901	28.27	
TMCN	Sam Cheung Ho-sum	35,513	20.12	
Independent	Wong Ji-yuet	22,911	12.98	
TSW Connection	Ng Kin-wai, Lam Chun	20,525	11.63	
Democratic	Andrew Wan Siu-kin	18,608	10.54	
Civic	Kwok Ka-ki	13,354	7.56	
Labour	Carol Ng Man-yee	10,860	6.15	
Neo Democrats	Tam Hoi-pong, Roy Pun Long-chung	4,865	2.76	
Total valid votes		176,537	100.00	
Rejected ballots		39		
Turnout		176,576	13.54	
Registered electors		1,303,946		

New Territories East
List	Candidates	Votes	Of total (%)	± from prev.
Nonpartisan	Ho Kwai-lam	26,802	16.30	
Localist	Lau Wing-hong, Li Chi-wang, Chiu Chu-pong, Wong Hok-lai, Chan Wan-tung, Ricardo Liao Pak-hong, William Shek, Lo Tak-ming, Wong Ho-fung	26,707	16.24	
Civic	Alvin Yeung Ngok-kiu	25,366	15.42	
People Power	Raymond Chan Chi-chuen	17,101	10.40	
Nonpartisan	Owen Chow Ka-shing	16,758	10.19	
Democratic	Lam Cheuk-ting, Wong Hoi-ying, Ng Ting-lam, Kwok Long-fung	15,315	9.31	
Neo Democrats	Gary Fan Kwok-wai, Lai Ming-chak	10,156	6.18	
Nonpartisan	Hendrick Lui Chi-hang	9,813	5.97	
LSD	Leung Kwok-hung	9,292	5.65	
Nonpartisan	Mike Lam	5,350	3.25	
Community Alliance	Ricky Or Yiu-lam	1,489	0.91	
Independent	Lee Chi-yung	304	0.18	
Total valid votes		164,453	100.00	
Rejected ballots		1,650		
Turnout		166,103	14.61	
Registered electors		1,136,648		

=== Functional Constituencies ===
District Council (Second)
List	Candidates	Votes	Of total (%)	± from prev.
Democratic	Kwong Chun-yu	268,630	50.69	
Nonpartisan	Lester Shum	129,074	24.35	
Localist	Wong Pak-yu	71,706	13.53	
Democratic	James To Kun-sun	49,991	9.43	
Civic	Lee Yue-shun	10,579	2.00	
Total valid votes		529,980	100.00	
Rejected ballots		N/A		
Turnout		529,980	12.66	
Registered electors		4,187,738		

Health Services
Party	Candidate	Votes	%	±%
HAEA	Winnie Yu Wai-ming	2,493	75.98	
Ind. democrat	Michael Felix Lau Hoi-man	516	15.73	
Professionals Guild	Joseph Lee Kok-long	218	6.64	
Nonpartisan	Yuen Wai-kit	54	1.65	
Total valid votes		3,281	100.00	
Rejected ballots		0		
Turnout		8.13		
Registered electors		40,358		

== Responses ==
Chief Executive Carrie Lam issued a strong warning to the candidates and organisers of the primaries, saying it was subversive for them to vow to seize control of the legislature and vote down key government proposals. "If this so-called primary election's purpose is to achieve the ultimate goal of delivering what they called '35+' [lawmakers], with the objective of objecting or resisting every policy initiative of the HKSAR government, it may fall into the category of subverting the state power – one of the four types of offences under the national security law," she said.

A spokesman for Beijing's Liaison Office in Hong Kong condemned the opposition camp for ignoring the Hong Kong government's warning of possible legal breaches and pressing ahead with the primary. "It is a serious provocation to the current election system, seriously damages the fairness and impartiality of the Legislative Council election, and seriously harms to the legal rights and interests of other candidates," the office wrote. It named Benny Tai as a suspect in a possible breach of the national security law by coordinating with the opposition camp to seek control of the legislature, vote down the budget, paralyse the government and subvert the state power. It also accused Tai and the opposition of aiming to take over the city's governance by staging the Hong Kong version of a "colour revolution". The Hong Kong and Macau Affairs Office (HKMAO) also accused organiser Benny Tai of "illegally manipulating" the Hong Kong's electoral system, challenging the new national security law and acting as a political agent for foreign forces.

Benny Tai defended that the candidates were not seeking to undermine the performance of duties and functions by the body of power of the central government or of Hong Kong, referring to their agreement that pro-democrats should veto the budget if they were voted into the legislature. "Legco's power of vetoing the budget is stated in the Basic Law," he said. "How can a power that is recognised by the Basic Law be breaching the national security law?" Amid the threats from the Beijing authorities, Au Nok-hin announced on 15 July that he would step down as the organiser of the primaries.

U.S. Secretary of State Mike Pompeo congratulated the success of the primaries and said the United States was gravely concerned over Carrie Lam's warning that the primaries might have violated the new national security law. In a statement, Pompeo said Washington would be watching developments in Hong Kong closely and urged the Legislative Council general election in September to be "equally free and fair".

== Arrests and trials ==
53 pro-democracy activists were arrested on the morning of 6 January 2021 under the new national security law over their organisation and participation in the primaries including six organizers and 47 participants. The police also searched 72 places including home of jailed activist Joshua Wong, the offices of news outlets Apple Daily, Stand News and InMedia HK and froze more than $200,000 in funds related to the effort. Maya Wang of Human Rights Watch issued a statement condemning the arrests: "The Chinese government has decided to mark 2021 with sweeping arrests of over 50 prominent pro-democracy activists in Hong Kong, removing the remaining veneer of democracy in the city. Beijing once again has failed to learn from its mistakes in Hong Kong: that repression generates resistance, and that millions of Hong Kong people will persist in their struggle for their right to vote and run for office in a democratically elected government." The arrests also received a round of international criticism. British Foreign Secretary Dominic Raab called "the mass arrest of politicians and activists in Hong Kong is a grievous attack on Hong Kong's rights and freedoms as protected under the Joint Declaration."

On 28 February 2021, of the 55 pro-democracy figures initially arrested in January, 47 were officially charged with conspiracy to commit subversion under the national security law.

== See also ==
- 2020 Hong Kong Legislative Council candidates' disqualification controversy
- Postponement of the 2020 Hong Kong legislative election
