= Stanley & Shek O (constituency) =

Constituency in the Southern District, Hong Kong

- Elected constituency for the Southern District Council
- Boundary of Stanley & Shek O in Southern District
- District: Southern
- Legislative Council constituency: Hong Kong Island West
- Population: 20,149 (2019)
- Electorate: 8,114 (2019)

Current constituency
- Created: 1982 (first time); 1994
- Number of members: One
- Member: Vacant

Stanley & Shek O (Chinese: 赤柱及石澳) is one of the 17 constituencies in the Southern District, Hong Kong.

The constituency returns one district councillor to the Southern District Council, with an election every four years.

Stanley & Shek O constituency has an estimated population of 22,258.

== Councillors represented ==
Election	Member	Party
1982	Chan Ping-kwan	Independent
1985	Chan Yau-yu	Independent
1988	Constituency abolished	
1994	Chan Yau-yu	Independent
1999	Lee Pui-ying	Independent
2019	Michael Pang Cheuk-kei→Vacant (Note: Disqualified on 15 September 2021 after his oath was invalid due to his involvement in pro-democracy primaries.)	Independent democrat

== Election results ==
=== 2010s ===
Southern District Council Election, 2019: Stanley & Shek O
Party	Candidate	Votes	%	±%
Ind. democrat	Michael Pang Cheuk-kei	2,680	49.86	
Nonpartisan	Lee Pui-ying	2,592	48.22	
Nonpartisan	Chan Shun-yee	103	1.92	
Majority		88	1.64	
Turnout		5,395	66.52	
Ind. democrat gain from Nonpartisan		Swing		
