= Michael Ho =

Michael Ho may refer to:

- Michael Ho (surfer) (born 1957), Chinese American surfer
- Michael Ho (politician) (born 1955), member of the Legislative Council of Hong Kong
- Mike He (born 1983), or Mike Ho, Taiwanese actor
- Michael Ho (racing driver) (born 1968), racing driver of Macau
