= Tat Cheng =

Hong Kong politician (born 1988)

- 鄭達鴻
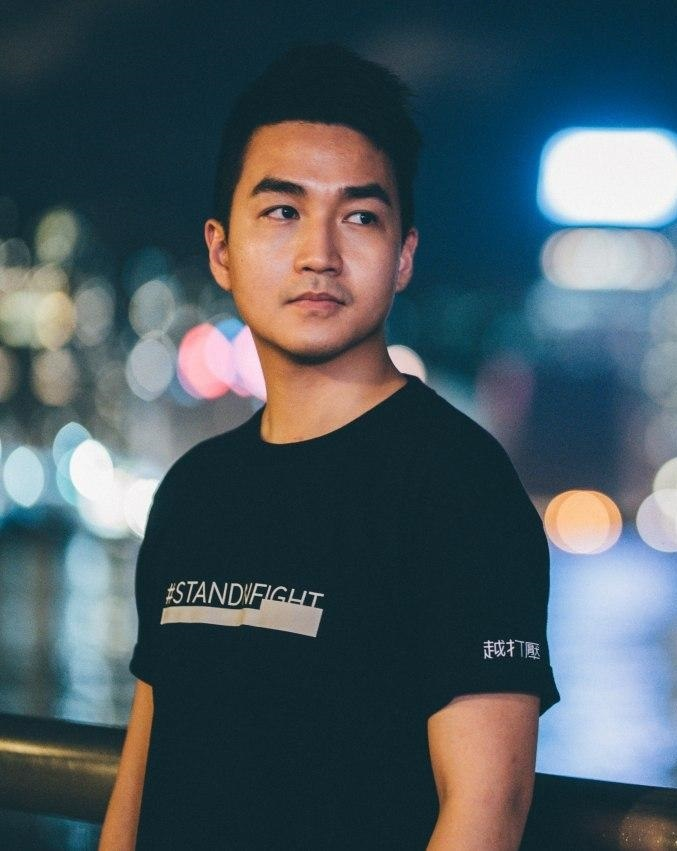
- Cheng in 2020

Member of the Eastern District Council
- In office 1 January 2016 – 11 May 2021
- Preceded by: Desmond Lee
- Constituency: Tanner

Personal details
- Born: 20 October 1988 (age 37) British Hong Kong
- Party: Civic Party
- Education: City University of Hong Kong; Hong Kong Polytechnic University
Tat Cheng
- Traditional Chinese: 鄭達鴻
Transcriptions
Yue: Cantonese
- Jyutping: zeng6 daat6 hung4

Cheng Tat-hung (Chinese: 鄭達鴻; born 20 October 1988), also known as Tat Cheng, is a Hong Kong politician, formerly affiliated with the Civic Party. He was a member of Eastern District Council for Tanner from 2016 to 2021.

== Education ==
Cheng was educated at Cheung Chuk Shan College and St. Stephen's College. He graduated from the Hong Kong Polytechnic University with a bachelor's degree in Social Policy and Administration. In 2016, he began studying for a Doctor of Jurisprudence (JD) degree at the City University of Hong Kong (CUHK). Cheng's legal studies were concurrent with his duties as an active district councillor. According to Cheng, his intent for pursuing the doctoral degree was to equip himself with legal knowledge and earn the trust of his constituents.

In 2018, Cheng completed his studies and graduated from the program with the JD designation. In the following year, he began pursuing a Postgraduate Certificate in Laws at CUHK. This program allows graduates to qualify for representation as a barrister or solicitor in Hong Kong. Cheng reiterated the value of legal knowledge after the 2019–2020 Hong Kong protests commenced, stating that it can help protesters with obtaining bail and navigating the judicial process.

== Political career ==
=== Civic Party ===
As a university student, Cheng had a two-month internship with the pan-democrat Civic Party in 2011. After graduation, he officially joined the political party in late 2012. Cheng became the chairman of the party's youth-oriented section, known as the "Young Civics", in 2014. He was the vice secretary-general of the party between 2016 and 2018.

During his tenure with the Civic Party, Cheng was involved in community outreach initiatives within North Point. He also made guest appearances on City Forum to give speeches and discuss local politics. Cheng participated in the 2016 Legislative Council election as the second candidate for Tanya Chan. Their ticket came in sixth place, thus securing Chan a seat in the Legislative Council.

On 15 December 2020, Cheng announced his resignation from the Civic Party after eight years of tenure.

=== District Council ===
In the 2015 District Council election, Cheng ran in Tanner constituency, previously held by veteran politician Desmond Lee. His opponent was Tsang Cheuk-yi from the pro-Beijing Liberal Party, who had the backing of Lee. Cheng won the seat with 53.4% of the vote, becoming the only pro-democracy Eastern District Councillor in North Point.

Cheng was challenged by Tsang again for his district council seat in 2019. Cheng formed a pro-democracy alliance with other candidates in North Point and Fortress Hill, aiming to contest pro-establishment seats in the election. On 25 November, he was re-elected with 57.65% of the vote. His pro-democracy alliance won six of the seven seats they contested, amid the landslide democrat success Hong Kong-wide.

=== Legislative Council bid ===
In the 2020 Legislative Council election, Cheng was nominated by the Civic Party to run in the Hong Kong Island constituency. He replaced incumbent Tanya Chan, who was barred from running due to her suspended sentence over the 2014 Occupy protests. In the pro-democracy primaries in July 2020, Cheng took fourth place, behind Ted Hui, Tiffany Yuen, and Fergus Leung. His 11,090 votes (12.26% of the electorate) secured him a nomination spot in the legislative election.

On 25 July, Cheng fielded a series of questions from electoral officers, which challenged his eligibility in the upcoming election. He was given 24 hours to clarify his stance on the national security law, as well as his views on international sanctions and allegiance to the Hong Kong Basic Law. Civic Party members Alvin Yeung, Dennis Kwok, and Kwok Ka-ki, along with other pro-democracy candidates, faced similar questioning. The next day, Cheng issued his response before the mandated deadline.

On 30 July, it was announced that Cheng had been disqualified from running in the election. His colleagues from the Civic Party and other candidates from the pro-democracy camp were also disqualified. Following his resignation from the Civic Party in December, Cheng said that he would not be able to participate in the rescheduled 2021 Hong Kong legislative election unless the political landscape changed drastically.

=== Arrest and trial under National Security Law ===
On 6 January 2021, Cheng was among 53 members of the pro-democratic camp arrested under the national security law, specifically its provision regarding alleged subversion. The group stood accused of organising and participating in unofficial primary elections held by the camp in July 2020. Cheng was released on bail on 7 January.

In February 2021, Cheng was charged with subversion and rearrested along with 46 other activists and politicians. He was one of only three granted bail in the case on 13 March 2021. On 1 April 2021, High Court judge Esther Toh explained her rationale for upholding Cheng's bail application. While the prosecution had accused Cheng of taking part in the primaries with the ultimate aim of "removing Carrie Lam from office" and that he had expressed similar positions during a video forum that "may have been understood as calling for foreign interference", Toh understood that Cheng had renounced his political activism by stepping down from his position in the Civic Party and that he had a limited political influence at the time of the appeal against his bail, with a "very-low risk of reoffending."

The high profile trial of 47 democrats began on 6 February 2023, with 16 pleading not guilty. On 15 June, Cheng became the first defendant to testify.

On 30 May 2024, Cheng was found guilty of subversion in the primaries case, along with 13 other defendants.

On 19 November 2024, Cheng was sentenced to 6 years and six months in prison.

Political offices
Preceded by Desmond Lee	Member of Eastern District Council; Representative for Tanner; 2016–2021	Vacant
Party political offices
New title	Deputy Secretary-General of Civic Party; 2016–2018	Succeeded by Daniel Wong
