= Michael Pang =

Hong Kong politician

- 彭卓棋
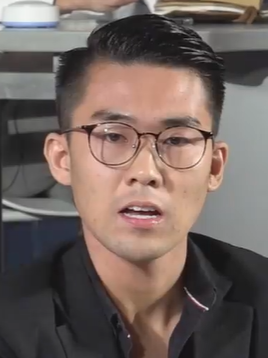
- Pang in 2020

Southern District Councillor
- In office 1 January 2020 – 15 September 2021
- Preceded by: Lee Pui-ying
- Constituency: Stanley & Shek O

Personal details
- Born: 20 June 1994 (age 32) Hong Kong
- Party: League of Social Democrats (2009–11)
- Relations: Jordan Pang (brother)
- Education: University of Hong Kong (BSS)

Michael Pang Cheuk-kei (Chinese: 彭卓棋; born 20 June 1994) is a Hong Kong politician and former Southern District Councillor. After being arrested for joining pro-democracy primaries as one of the Hong Kong 47, Pang joined a pro-Beijing group.

== Early career ==
Born to a Hongkonger father and a Korean mother, Pang studied in Shatin Christ College for secondary school, during which he worked with Wong Yuk-man from League of Social Democrats between 2009 and 2011. He was admitted to the University of Hong Kong after the first Hong Kong Diploma of Secondary Education Examination in 2012, studying politics and history.

Once participated in the 2014 Umbrella Movement protest, Pang lost Hong Kong University Students' Union elections in 2014 and 2015, after one of his proposed executive colleague was revealed to be a member of the Communist Youth League of China. Pang rejected any pro-China claims and insisted he was unaware of this information.

== Political career ==
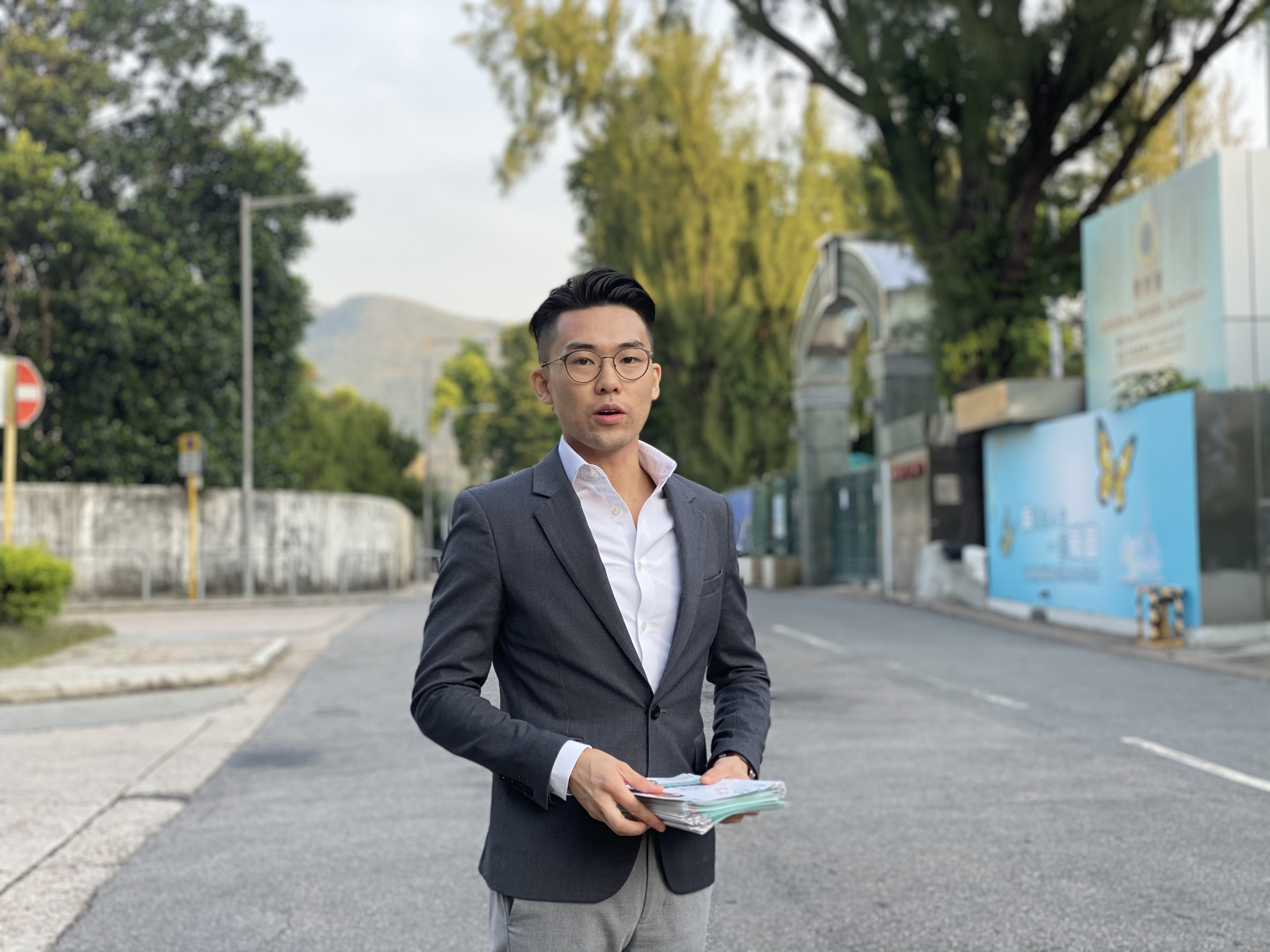
Pang in 2019

Pang joined pro-democracy Hong Kong South Concern Group in 2019, and ran in the local elections for Stanley & Shek O constituency where he had been focusing on. With the increased turnout and support amidst the anti-extradition bill protest, Pang defeated five-time councillor Lee Pui-ying with 49.9% of votes.

In his term of office, Pang urged the authorities to rebuild Shek O Lovers Bridge, the tourist attraction destroyed by 2018 Typhoon Mangkhut. The bridge re-opened to public in April 2021. He also worked with the authorities on the renovation of two historic buildings, Shek O Bus Terminus and Stanley Post Office, and the preservation of Stanley Road heritage trail.

In the 2020 pro-democracy primaries for the now-postponed Legislative Council election, Pang was defeated in the Hong Kong Island constituency with the fewest votes.

In January 2021, he was arrested by the national security police for his role in the primaries, and was subsequently charged with subversion along with others in the "Hong Kong 47" case. He was one of the few defendants released on bail by court in early March, but will have to give up travel documents, observe a curfew and report to police regularly, in addition to a ban of making remarks that could be deemed as endangering national security.

Under the new law that requires oath-taking for District Councillors, Pang's oath of office that pledges to uphold the Basic Law and bear allegiance to the Hong Kong Government was deemed invalid. Pang, therefore, was unseated on 15 September 2021.

Pang was later reported to have joined pro-China Basic Law Student Centre, giving a speech as the President of the Centre in 2022 which quoted General Secretary of the Chinese Communist Party Xi Jinping and promoted Chinese constitution, raising concern if Pang joined the pro-Beijing camp.

On 30 May 2024, Pang was found guilty of subversion in the primaries case, along with 13 other defendants.

== Electoral performance ==
Southern District Council Election, 2019: Stanley & Shek O
Party	Candidate	Votes	%	±%
Ind. democrat	Michael Pang Cheuk-kei	2,680	49.86	
Nonpartisan	Lee Pui-ying	2,592	48.22	
Nonpartisan	Chan Shun-yee	103	1.92	
Majority		88	1.64	
Turnout		5,395	66.52	
Ind. democrat gain from Nonpartisan		Swing		
