= Ronald Chow =

- 周美德

Member of the Legislative Council
- In office 12 October 1988 – 22 August 1991
- Succeeded by: Michael Ho
- Constituency: Health

Personal details
- Born: 1951 (age 74–75) Hong Kong
- Party: Association for Democracy and People's Livelihood (1980s–1990s); United Democrats of Hong Kong (1990)
- Education: University of Hong Kong (BSocSc)
- Occupation: Registered Nurse

Coat of arms of Ronald Chow
Notes Granted by Samy Khalid, Chief Herald of Canada, on 15 September 2021. Crest A three-masted Chinese junk Gules sails unfurled Argent. Escutcheon Argent four shuttlecocks in saltire bases inwards a chief embattled Gules platé.

Ronald Chow Mei-tak (Chinese: 周美德; born 1951) was the member of the Legislative Council of Hong Kong for Health functional constituency.

Chow graduated from the University of Hong Kong, with a bachelor's degree in Social Sciences. He also got a diploma in health administration. He became a registered nurse in Hong Kong and a state registered nurse in the United Kingdom. He was also an organizer for the AIA Group Limited.

He became one of the three Legislative Councillors of the United Democrats of Hong Kong, the first pro-democratic political party when it established in 1990. But he soon quit the party for the Hong Kong Association for Democracy and People's Livelihood (ADPL). In the first Legislative Council direct election in 1991, he contested in the New Territories North constituency but was lost to Meeting Point's Tik Chi-yuen and United Democrats' Fung Chi-wood.
