= Carol Ng =

Hong Kong politician (born 1970)

- 吳敏兒
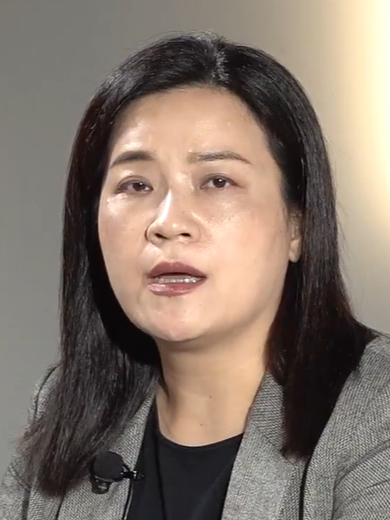

Chairperson of Hong Kong Confederation of Trade Unions
- In office 28 July 2016 – 6 March 2021
- Preceded by: Pun Tin-chi
- Succeeded by: Joe Wong

Personal details
- Born: 24 October 1970 (age 55)
- Party: HKCTU (until 2021); Labour (until 2021)
- Occupation: Trade unionist

Carol Ng Man-yee (Chinese: 吳敏兒, born 24 October 1970) is a Hong Kong former trade unionist. Ng was an active member of unions as a former flight attendant, and later became the chairperson of Hong Kong Confederation of Trade Unions from 2016 until her arrest in 2021 as part of the Hong Kong 47.

== Early career ==
After her graduation from secondary school, Ng first worked in a bank as a clerk. She resigned and was employed by Cathay Pacific as a member of the ground staff. Meanwhile, she entered the 1990 singing competition New Talent Singing Awards and was one of the ten finalists. Two years later, she joined British Airways as a flight attendant.

== Trade unionist ==
In 2003, British Airways (BA) announced a one-third deduction of staff's double pay. Following unsuccessful negotiations between the company and the staff, Ng founded the British Airways Hong Kong International Cabin Crew Association (BAHKICCA) and successfully sued BA for compensation in the same year. BA was then fined again by the authorities after the airline sent a warning against Ng for accepting media interview without prior notice.

BAHKICCA then filed a lawsuit at Employment Tribunal of the United Kingdom over the airline's unwritten retirement age of Hong Kong staff at 45, arguing the requirement was discrimination due to age and race. The judge ruled in the union's favour on the grounds that British Airways was registered in the United Kingdom, rejecting BA's claim that Hong Kong flight attendants are not protected by UK laws. After six years of prolonged litigation, BA abandoned the appeal and agreed to extend the retirement age to 65, and thus 24 over-45 attendants were allowed to return to work.

=== Leader of trade unions ===
By March 2016, Ng was the chairlady of Hong Kong Cabin Crew Federation. She led the sit-in at the airport, where around 2,500 joined, to protest the alleged abuse of power by then-Chief Executive Leung Chun-ying over the bag-gate. She was elected to chair the Hong Kong Confederation of Trade Unions in July 2016. Ng lost her job at BA in October 2018 as the airline laid off all 85 staff and shut down the Hong Kong base.

During the 2019 protests across the city, Ng as the leader of HKCTU was one of the leaders of the general strike. She said the general strike is a new form of protest that prompted workers at different industries to consider forming unions, and that HKCTU would assist in unionization and protect the labour rights.

At the early outbreak of the coronavirus pandemic in 2020, Ng was denounced by mouthpieces of the Chinese government for instigating a "destructive" strike by the healthcare workers, who demanded a closure of the border to stop the spread of virus from China. Ng rejected the claims of harming the patients, and reaffirmed the necessity of border closure to protect the well-being of the public. She also applauded the unity by the workers.

== Arrest ==
Ng ran in the 2020 pro-democracy primaries for the later-cancelled Legislative Council election as a member of the Labour Party, losing in the New Territories West constituency. Ng was arrested on 6 January 2021, accused of violating the Hong Kong national security law for participating in the primaries, and was remanded in custody since the end of February. She repeatedly applied for bail but were all denied by the judges, citing her international influence due to her trade union work, as well as her previous determination to resist against the government.

Ng resigned from the HKCTU in March 2021, and later pleaded guilty to the charge. She was sentenced to jail for 4 years and 6 months, and was freed on 28 July 2025.
