= Tai Wai (constituency) =

Constituency in Sha Tin District Council, Hong Kong

- Elected constituency for the Sha Tin District Council
- Boundary of Tai Wai in Sha Tin District
- District: Sha Tin
- Legislative Council constituency: New Territories North East
- Population: 20,083 (2019)
- Electorate: 12,731 (2019)

Current constituency
- Created: 1985
- Number of members: One
- Member: Kudama Ng Ting-lam (Democratic)

Tai Wai is one of the 41 constituencies of the Sha Tin District Council. The constituency elects one member of the council every four years. It was first created in 1985 Hong Kong district boards election. The constituency boundary is loosely based on Tai Wai.

== Councillors represented ==
=== 1985 to 1991 ===
Election	First Member	First Party	Second Member	Second Party
1985	Hui Lai-mui	Independent	Wai Hon-leung	Independent
1988	Cheung Puk-yu	Independent	Wai Hon-leung	Independent

=== 1991 to present ===
Election	Member	Party
1991	Wai Hon-leung	Independent
1994	Ronney Chan Kai-yung	Independent
199?	Ronney Chan Kai-yung	Progressive Alliance
1999	Leung Wing-hung	Democratic
2007	Yeung Kwai-choi	DAB
2009 by-election	Leung Wing-hung	Democratic
2010	Leung Wing-hung	Neo Democrats
2011	Kelly Tung Kin-lei	DAB
2019	Kudama Ng Ting-lam	Democratic

== Election results ==
=== 2010s ===
Sha Tin District District Council Election, 2019: Tai Wai
Party	Candidate	Votes	%	±%
Democratic (PfD)	Kudama Ng Ting-lam	4,198	46.06	
DAB	Kelly Tung Kin-lei	4,114	45.14	−18.46
Independent	Owen Chow Ka-shing	748	8.21	
ASEA	Yuen Kwai-hei	54	0.59	
Majority		84	0.92	
Turnout		9,149	71.89	
Democratic gain from DAB		Swing		

Sha Tin District District Council Election, 2015: Tai Wai
Party	Candidate	Votes	%	±%
DAB	Kelly Tung Kin-lei	3,649	63.6	+10.5
Sha Tin Community Network	Leung Chun-hin	2,087	36.4	–10.5
Majority		1,562	27.2	+21.0
Turnout		5,736	47.0	+6.4
DAB hold		Swing	+10.5	

Sha Tin District Council Election, 2011: Tai Wai
Party	Candidate	Votes	%	±%
DAB	Kelly Tung Kin-lei	3,302	53.1	+14.4
Neo Democrats	Leung Wing-hung	2,921	46.9	–14.4
Majority		381	6.2	−2.4
Turnout		3,048	40.4	
DAB gain from Neo Democrats		Swing	+14.4	

=== 2000s ===
Tai Wai by-election, 2009
Party	Candidate	Votes	%	±%
Democratic	Leung Wing-hung	2,820	47.3	–2.0
DAB	Yuen Kwai-choi	2,301	38.7	−12.0
Independent	Lee York-fai	790	13.3	
Independent	Chan Wai-man	19	0.3	
Independent	Chau Chi-pong	13	0.2	
Majority		519	8.6	–19.2
Turnout		5,963	49.0	
Democratic gain from DAB		Swing		

Sha Tin District Council Election, 2007: Tai Wai
Party	Candidate	Votes	%	±%
DAB	Yuen Kwai-choi	2,851	50.7	+14.6
Democratic	Leung Wing-hung	2,768	49.3	–14.6
Majority		83	1.4	−26.4
DAB gain from Democratic		Swing	+14.6	

Sha Tin District Council Election, 2003: Tai Wai
Party	Candidate	Votes	%	±%
Democratic	Leung Wing-hung	2,813	63.9	+6.7
DAB	Yuen Kwai-choi	1,590	36.1	
Majority		1,223	27.8	+13.4
Democratic hold		Swing		

=== 1990s ===
Sha Tin District Council Election, 1999: Tai Wai
Party	Candidate	Votes	%	±%
Democratic	Leung Wing-hung	1,658	57.2	
HKPA	Ronney Chan Kai-yung	1,241	42.8	–19.1
Majority		417	14.4	
Democratic gain from HKPA		Swing		

Sha Tin District Board Election, 1994: Tai Wai
Party	Candidate	Votes	%	±%
Independent	Ronney Chan Kai-yung	1,143	61.9	
Independent	Cheung Wing-keung	705	38.1	
Majority		438	23.8	+13.7
Independent gain from Independent		Swing		

Sha Tin District Board Election, 1991: Tai Wai
Party	Candidate	Votes	%	±%
Independent	Wai Hon-leung	705	46.2	+14.9
Independent	Mak Wai-hung	550	36.1	
United Democrats	Ko Chok-keung	270	17.7	
Majority		155	10.1	
Independent hold		Swing		

=== 1980s ===
Sha Tin District Board Election, 1988: Tai Wai
Party	Candidate	Votes	%	±%
Independent	Wai Hon-leung	1,877	31.3	–1.5
Independent	Cheung Puk-yu	1,390	23.2	
Independent	Ronney Chan Kai-yung	1,134	18.9	
Independent	Hui Hon-ching	938	15.6	
HKAS	Wong Sui-kwan	660	11.0	
Independent hold		Swing		
Independent gain from Independent		Swing		

Sha Tin District Board Election, 1985: Tai Wai
Party	Candidate	Votes	%	±%
Independent	Hui Lai-mui	1,556	37.8	
Independent	Wai Hon-leung	1,349	32.8	
Independent	Ronney Chan Kai-yung	1,209	29.4	
Independent win (new seat)				
Independent win (new seat)				
