= Tanner (constituency) =

Hong Kong constituency

- Elected constituency for the Eastern District Council
- Boundary of Tanner in Eastern District
- District: Eastern
- Legislative Council constituency: Hong Kong Island East
- Population: 15,959 (2019)
- Electorate: 9,037 (2019)

Current constituency
- Created: 1994
- Number of members: One
- Member: Vacant
- Created from: North Point East

Tanner (Chinese: 丹拿) is one of the 35 constituencies in the Eastern District, Hong Kong.

The constituency returns one district councillor to the Eastern District Council, with an election every four years. The seat was last held by former Civic Party politician Cheng Tat-hung.

Tanner constituency is loosely based on the area around Tanner Garden and Bedford Gardens in North Point with estimated population of 15,959.

== Councillors represented ==
Election	Member	Party	%
1994	Desmond Lee Yu-tai	Independent→Frontier	59.31
1999	Desmond Lee Yu-tai	Frontier→Independent	46.29
2003	Desmond Lee Yu-tai	Independent	70.11
2007	Desmond Lee Yu-tai	Independent	81.55
2011	Desmond Lee Yu-tai	Independent→Liberal	67.83
2015	Cheng Tat-hung	Civic	53.42
2019	Cheng Tat-hung→Vacant (Note: Resigned on 21 May 2021 after being arrested under national security law.)	Civic→Independent	57.65

== Election results ==
=== 2010s ===
Eastern District Council Election, 2019: Tanner
Party	Candidate	Votes	%	±%
Civic	Cheng Tat-hung	3,947	57.65	+4.25
Liberal	Pearl Tsang Cheuk-yi	2,899	42.35	−4.25
Majority		1,048	15.30	
Turnout		6,878	76.11	
Civic hold		Swing		

Eastern District Council Election, 2015: Tanner
Party	Candidate	Votes	%	±%
Civic	Cheng Tat-hung	2,338	53.4	
Liberal	Pearl Tsang Cheuk-yi	2,039	46.6	
Majority		299	6.8	
Turnout		4,414	54.0	
Civic gain from Liberal		Swing		

Eastern District Council Election, 2011: Tanner
Party	Candidate	Votes	%	±%
Independent	Desmond Lee Yu-tai	1,750	67.8	−13.8
Independent	Kay Yim Fung-chi	470	18.2	
Independent	Wong Shing-kwong	360	14.0	
Independent hold		Swing		

=== 2000s ===
Eastern District Council Election, 2007: Tanner
Party	Candidate	Votes	%	±%
Independent	Desmond Lee Yu-tai	2,069	81.6	+11.5
Independent	Wong Shing-kwong	468	18.4	
Independent hold		Swing		

Eastern District Council Election, 2003: Tanner
Party	Candidate	Votes	%	±%
Independent	Desmond Lee Yu-tai	2,657	70.1	+24.3
DAB	Cheng Chi-sing	1,133	29.9	−1.4
Independent hold		Swing		

=== 1990s ===
Eastern District Council Election, 1999: Tanner
Party	Candidate	Votes	%	±%
Frontier	Desmond Lee Yu-tai	1,173	45.8	−12.9
Independent	Cheng Chi-sing	800	31.3	
Independent	Choi Ming-kei	561	21.9	
Frontier hold		Swing		

Eastern District Board Election, 1994: Tanner
Party	Candidate	Votes	%	±%
Independent	Desmond Lee Yu-tai	1,093	58.7	
HKDF	Wong Wing-cheong	750	40.3	
Independent win (new seat)				
