= Joseph Lee (Hong Kong politician) =

Hong Kong politician

Joseph Lee Kok-long SBS
- 李國麟
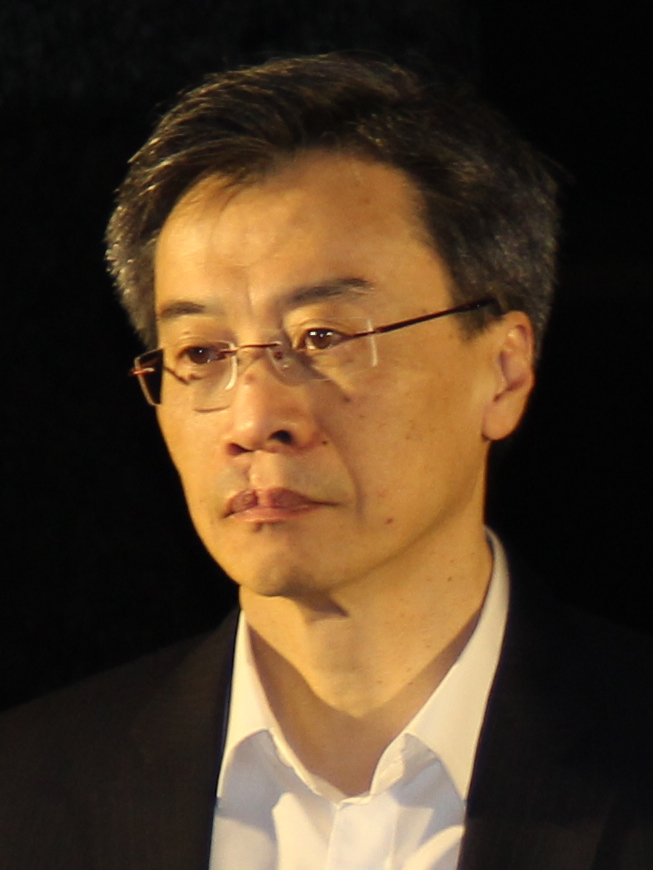

Member of the Legislative Council
- In office 1 October 2004 – 1 December 2020
- Preceded by: Michael Mak
- Succeeded by: David Lam (Medical and Health Services)
- Constituency: Health Services

Personal details
- Born: 14 August 1959 (age 67) Portuguese Macau
- Spouse: Dianna Lee Tze-fan
- Education: Shau Kei Wan Government Secondary School; La Trobe University; University of Edinburgh; Lingnan University
- Profession: Professor; Nurse

Joseph Lee
- Traditional Chinese: 李國麟
- Simplified Chinese: 李国麟
Transcriptions
Standard Mandarin
- Hanyu Pinyin: Lǐ Guólíng
Yue: Cantonese
- Jyutping: lei5 gwok3 leon4

Joseph Lee Kok-long SBS (born 14 August 1959) is a Hong Kong politician who was a former member of the Legislative Council of Hong Kong (Legco), representing the Health Services functional constituency. He is a member of the Pro-democracy camp.

Lee is a nurse and a Professor and Dean in the School of Nursing and Health Studies at the Open University of Hong Kong.

== Education ==
Lee received his Bachelor of Nursing degree from the La Trobe University, Australia in 1992. His master's degree was in nursing/education from the University of Edinburgh. In 2002 he completed his PhD thesis, Ascertaining Patient Condition: a grounded theory study of diagnostic practice in nursing from Lingnan University in Hong Kong.

== Political career ==
Lee became a member of the Legislative Council in 2004, representing the Health Services functional constituency.

In June 2010, he voted in favour of the government's 2012 constitutional reform package, which included the late amendment by the Democratic Party – accepted by the Beijing government – to hold a popular vote for five new District Council functional constituencies.

In March 2011, he abstained on legislation accepting reduced funding from Beijing for Hong Kong.

Lee announced his intention to step down from LegCo and not participate in the 2020 Hong Kong legislative election, following his loss to Winnie Yu in the 2020 Hong Kong pro-democracy primaries.

On 6 January 2021, Lee was among 53 members of the pro-democratic camp who were arrested under the national security law, specifically its provision regarding alleged subversion. The group stood accused of the organisation of and participation in unofficial primary elections held by the camp in July 2020. Lee was released on bail on 7 January.

== Committees ==
Lee served on the following Legco committees:

- 2008–09 Panel Committees:

Panel on Health Services
Panel on Food Safety & Environmental Hygiene
Panel on Housing

- 2008–09 Bill Committees:

Independent Police Complaints Council Bill
Prevention and Control of Disease Bill
Subcommittee on Harmful Substances in Food (Amendment) Regulation 2008

== Other appointments ==
He also serves as:

- the Chairman of Association of Hong Kong Nursing Staff;
- Vice-chairman of Independent Police Complaints Council.

He is a member of:

- the Hospital Authority and the Nursing Council of Hong Kong;
- the Hospital Governing Committee of Kwai Chung Hospital and Princess Margaret Hospital, Hong Kong;
- the Commission on Strategic Development;
- the Estate Agents Authority;
- the Operations Review Committee;
- the Independent Commission Against Corruption.

He is an honorary research fellow of the Asia-Pacific Institute of Ageing Studies at Lingnan University of Hong Kong.

Legislative Council of Hong Kong
Preceded by Michael Mak	Member of Legislative Council; Representative for Health Services; 2004–2020	Succeeded by David Lam (Medical and Health Services)
