= Sunny Cheung =

Hong Kong foreign policy expert (born 1996)

- 張崑陽
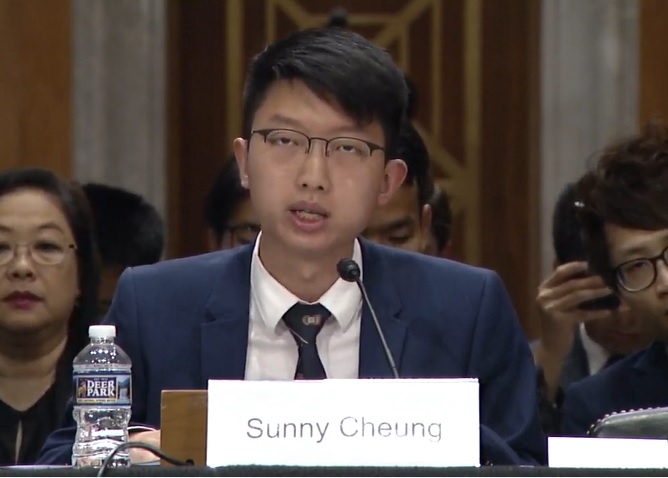
- Cheung at United States congressional hearing in 2019

Personal details
- Born: 3 March 1996 (age 30) British Hong Kong
- Party: Independent
- Education: Johns Hopkins University; University of Hong Kong
- Occupation: Political analyst

Sunny Cheung Kwan-yang (Chinese: 張崑陽; Jyutping: zoeng1 kwan1 joeng4; born 3 March 1996) is a foreign policy and open-source intelligence expert who is based in the United States. He specializes in China's politics, emerging technologies, PLA modernization and cross-strait relations. He is a Research Fellow at The Wilson Center and a Fellow for China Studies at The Jamestown Foundation and an International Strategic Forum (ISF) Fellow at the Special Competitive Studies Project (SCSP).

== Background ==
Cheung was educated at St. Joseph's College. His social activism started in 2012 when he participated in the protests against the Moral and National Education scheme. Cheung also took part in the 2014 Umbrella Revolution, where he joined thousands of protesters to occupy Causeway Bay until it was cleared by the police.

Cheung studied at Hong Kong Baptist University (HKBU), where he served as the vice president of the Hong Kong Baptist University Students' Union (HKBUSU). While he was vice president, the Hong Kong Federation of Students did not reach a consensus and therefore declined to attend the 26th anniversary of the 1989 Tiananmen Square protests for the first time. Cheung had disagreed with "the vigil’s underlying notion that we’re all Chinese". He remarked, "We want to build a democratic Hong Kong. It’s not our responsibility to build a democratic China."

Cheung later on continued his study on Sinology and Politics and Public Administration at the University of Hong Kong. He was an active debater who represented the university as on-stage speaker for political and current affairs motions. As the anti-extradition bill protests emerged in 2019, Cheung actively participated in the demonstrations. On 4 June 2020, he attended the vigil for the 31st anniversary of the Tiananmen Square protests, which was banned by the Hong Kong government. Cheung stated it was his first vigil since the Umbrella Revolution, and the recent circumstances changed his original stance to some extent. Cheung concluded the message by reiterating his support for the ongoing Hong Kong protests.

== International advocacy ==
On 11 July 2019, twelve student unions came together to form the Hong Kong Higher Institutions International Affairs Delegation (HKIAD), in which Cheung became the spokesperson of the delegation. Cheung described himself as a representative of over 100,000 students across Hong Kong, with the purpose of raising international awareness for the pro-democracy movement.

On 17 September, Cheung testified at the Congressional-Executive Commission on China (CECC) in Washington D.C., with activists Joshua Wong and Denise Ho. In his testimony, Cheung described the background of Hong Kong's protest movement and highlighted the ongoing police brutality by the Hong Kong Police Force. He described the city as "the frontline of the battle for freedom and against authoritarian China." Cheung ended his testimony by stating, "Hong Kong is in a critical moment in its history. We are calling for the U.S. to stand with us in our fight for freedom, democracy and dignity." In the months following Cheung's testimony, the Hong Kong Human Rights and Democracy Act was passed by the United States House of Representatives and the Senate. The bill was signed into law by President Donald Trump on 27 November 2019.

In light of the ongoing protests, Cheung expressed his view that "lobbying international governments is an important way to raise support for protesters in Hong Kong." In September 2019, Cheung met with a number of politicians across Australia, advocating for human rights clauses to be included in free trade agreements. In January 2020, he met with Taiwanese politician Chiu Chui-cheng to discuss forbidding Hong Kong police from entering the country.

After the national security law was introduced in May, Cheung appealed to international governments to offer asylum and residency for the Hong Kong activists. On 30 June, he declared the Hong Kong Higher Institutions International Affairs Delegation had disbanded, ceasing its operations. The looming new law, which targeted Hong Kong activists for "foreign interference", passed on the next day.

== Legislative Council bid ==
On 18 June 2020, Cheung announced his intention to run in the Hong Kong legislative election for the Kowloon West constituency. In July, he contested in the pro-democracy primaries and emerged as the runner-up behind Jimmy Sham of the League of Social Democrats (LSD). Cheung received 16,992 votes, which represented 20.97% of the electorate, and secured himself a nomination spot in the general election. He was one of the pro-democracy candidates who received letters from electoral officers on his positions on the national security law, before the general election was postponed to 2021.

== Relocating to the United States ==
In August 2020, Cheung reportedly moved to the United Kingdom out of an imminent arrest warrant against him. The Chinese government warned the British government against hosting Cheung and warned it about offering asylum to other pro-democracy activists. China said the UK was hosting "anti-China" forces after Cheung allegedly planned pro-democracy rallies.

On 15 September 2020, Cheung posted on social media that he had effectively left Hong Kong, though he did not say where he had fled to out of "security and strategic concerns".

== Research Career ==
Cheung received a Master of International Relations in strategic studies from Johns Hopkins School of Advanced International Studies. He has held fellowships at the Standford University, Johns Hopkins University, Research Institute for Democracy, Society and Emerging Technology in Taiwan, Pacific Forum and the Special Competitive Studies Project. In 2026 he was named a research fellow at the Woodrow Wilson International Center for Scholars.

In November 2024, Cheung published an analysis showing that researchers affiliated with the People’s Liberation Army (PLA) had adapted Meta’s Llama language model for military applications. The findings were reported by Reuters, and both the United States Department of Defense and Meta commented. Three days later, Meta announced that it would make Llama available to U.S. government agencies and contractors working on defense and national security applications.

Reuters also reported his subsequent research on the PLA’s procurement of DeepSeek-based systems in October 2025 and on Chinese military researchers’ use of distillation based on Anthropic and OpenAI models in July 2026, which Reuters described as the first documented evidence of the practice within the PLA. In February 2025, he testified before the U.S.–China Economic and Security Review Commission on China’s robotics industry.
