= Fergus Leung =

Hong Kong politician

Fergus Leung Fong-wai
- 梁晃維
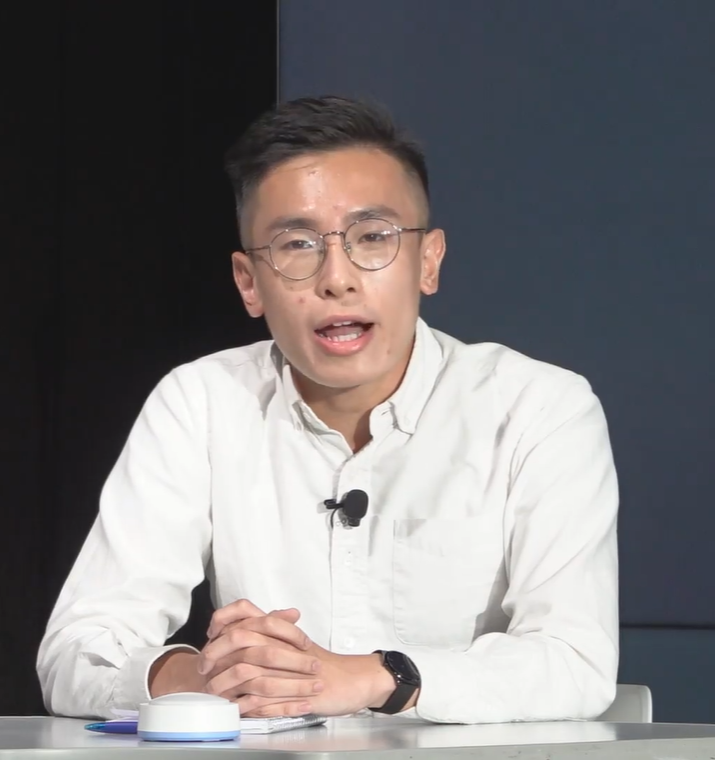

Member of the Central and Western District Council
- In office 1 January 2020 – 30 April 2021
- Preceded by: Yeung Hoi-wing
- Constituency: Kwun Lung

Personal details
- Born: April 3, 1997 (age 28) Hong Kong
- Party: Independent
- Occupation: Politician, activist

Fergus Leung
- Traditional Chinese: 梁晃維
Transcriptions
Yue: Cantonese
- Jyutping: loeng4 fong2 wai4

Fergus Leung Fong-wai (Chinese: 梁晃維; born 3 April 1997) is a Hong Kong politician formerly serving as a member of the Central and Western District Council, representing Kwun Lung. Leung ran as an independent Localist camp candidate in the 2019 District Council elections and won his seat with 50.69% of the vote.

== Career ==
Leung developed an interest in politics at high school, and took part in Hong Kong's 2014 Umbrella Movement as a teenager. He studied biomedicine at the University of Hong Kong, where he served as the external affairs secretary of the student union.

In July 2019, Leung was spurred by the ongoing Hong Kong protests to run for a position on his local District Council. As a first-time candidate competing against the incumbent Yeung Hoi-wing, Leung won the seat in Kwun Lung, which had been considered a pro-establishment stronghold, represented by the same political party since 2007. His election win was amid record voter turnout throughout the city, which Leung described as "a milestone in Hong Kong's pro-democracy movement".

In June 2020, Leung announced his intention to run in the 2020 Hong Kong legislative election. He connected with fellow localist camp candidates Sam Cheung and Owen Chow, where they signed a joint statement agreeing to promote the protest movement's demands if elected. In the pro-democracy primaries for the Hong Kong Island constituency, Leung took third place with 14,743 votes, after Ted Hui and Tiffany Yuen, securing him a nomination spot in the general election.

On 30 July, weeks before the general election, the government stated that Leung was among a dozen pro-democracy candidates whose nominations were 'invalid'. His disqualification was determined by an opaque process where returning officers nominally assessed whether Leung had objected to the enactment of the national security law, and was sincere in statements made disavowing separatism.

On 6 January 2021, Leung was among 55 members of the pro-democratic camp who were arrested under the national security law, specifically its provision regarding subversion. The group stood accused of organising and participating in unofficial primary elections held by the camp in July 2020. Leung was released on bail on 7 January.

On 30 April 2021, he resigned as a district councillor after he was charged under the national security law.

Political offices
Preceded by Yeung Hoi-wing	Member of Central and Western District Council; Representative for Kwun Lung; 2020–2021	Incumbent
