= Winnie Yu (nurse) =

Hong Kong nurse and activist (born 1987)

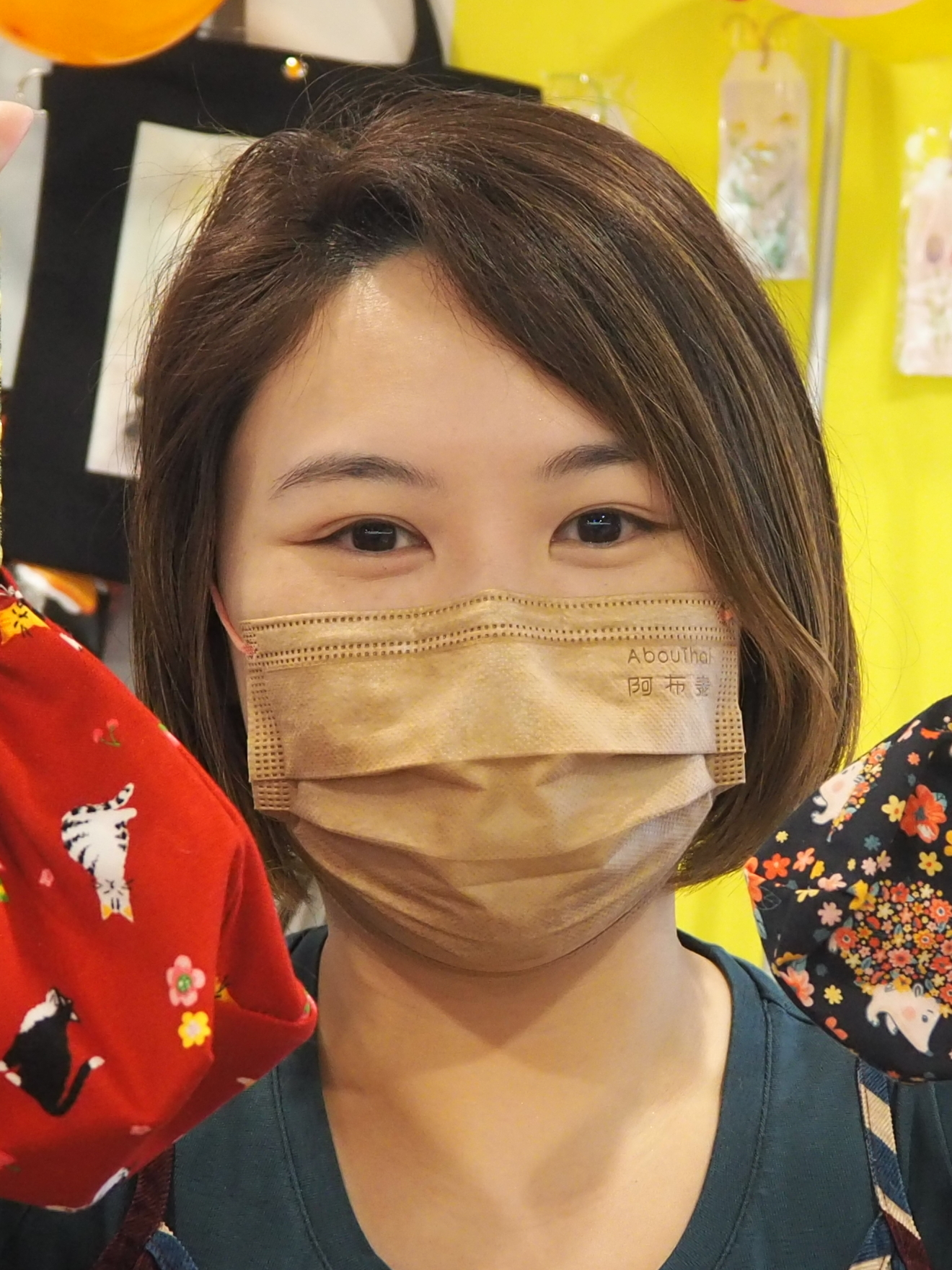
- Yu in 2022
- Born: 28 May 1987 (age 38); Hong Kong
- Occupations: Nurse, activist

Chinese name
- Chinese: 余慧明
Transcriptions
Standard Mandarin
- Hanyu Pinyin: Yú Huìmíng
Yue: Cantonese
- Jyutping: Jyu^{4} Wai^{6} ming^{4}

Winnie Yu Wai-ming (Chinese: 余慧明; born 28 May 1987) is a Hong Kong nurse and activist. She is the founder and chairwoman of the Hospital Authority Employees Alliance (HAEA), a labour union representing Hospital Authority staff. She played an instrumental role in the labour strike in February 2020 to demand full border closure in response to the COVID-19 outbreak in Hong Kong.

== Biography ==
Yu was trained as a nurse in university. She became a nurse at a Hospital Authority public hospital after graduation. In the 2014 Occupy protests, she volunteered as a paramedic at the protest site which opened the door for her to social activism. She also volunteered in many protest scenes, including the 2016 Mong Kok civil unrest. She was also transferred from Intensive Care Unit to the Hospital Authority head office and planned to emigrate to Japan.

In the 2019 anti-extradition protests, Yu became active in social activism, volunteering as a paramedic. The Hospital Authority Employees Alliance (HAEA) was founded in the call for forming labour unions to launch a city-wide strike to pressure the government, in which Yu became the chairwoman. Following the first outbreak of the COVID-19 in Hong Kong in January 2020, the Hong Kong government announced several control measures, including decreases in flights and closures of several border ports. Health care experts and the HAEA called for stronger border control closures than what the government has announced; at that time, areas in mainland China adjacent to Hong Kong, such as Shenzhen, had significantly more cases of coronavirus than Hong Kong. The HAEA called for a full border closure with mainland China, demanding that the government prevent all non-Hong Kong residents from entering the city via the mainland. The union attracted more than 12,000 applications to join as of January 2020.

Following Chief Executive Carrie Lam's announcement to close four borders to the mainland, rather than a full closure demanded by the HAEA, the union launched a labour strike for five days between 3 and 7 February 2020. Yu said that over 2,500 hospital workers participated in the strike on the first day, with about 60 to 70 percent of them being nurses. The strike was attended by about 6,000 workers each day over the five days. In response, Chief Executive Carrie Lam announced that four more borders to be closed but refused to fully close the border. She also called the medical workers who were on strike as "radical". In response to the government's decision not to fully close the border, Yu shifted the union's demands, asking for adequate protection measures for HA medical workers and for the HA to rule out penalising staff who participated in the strike. as well as On 7 February, the HAEA fell 2,000 votes short of the target it set to extend industrial action into middle of next week. In response, Yu announced an end to the five-day strike, though she said that ending the strike "doesn't mean [the union members] are giving up" with their demands.

Yu participated in the 2020 Hong Kong pro-democracy primaries and received 2,493 votes, winning against incumbent lawmaker Joseph Lee in the Health Services functional constituency.

On 6 January 2021, Yu was among 53 members of the pro-democratic camp who were arrested under the national security law, specifically its provision regarding alleged subversion. The group stood accused of the organisation of and participation in the primaries of July 2020. Yu was released on bail on 7 January.

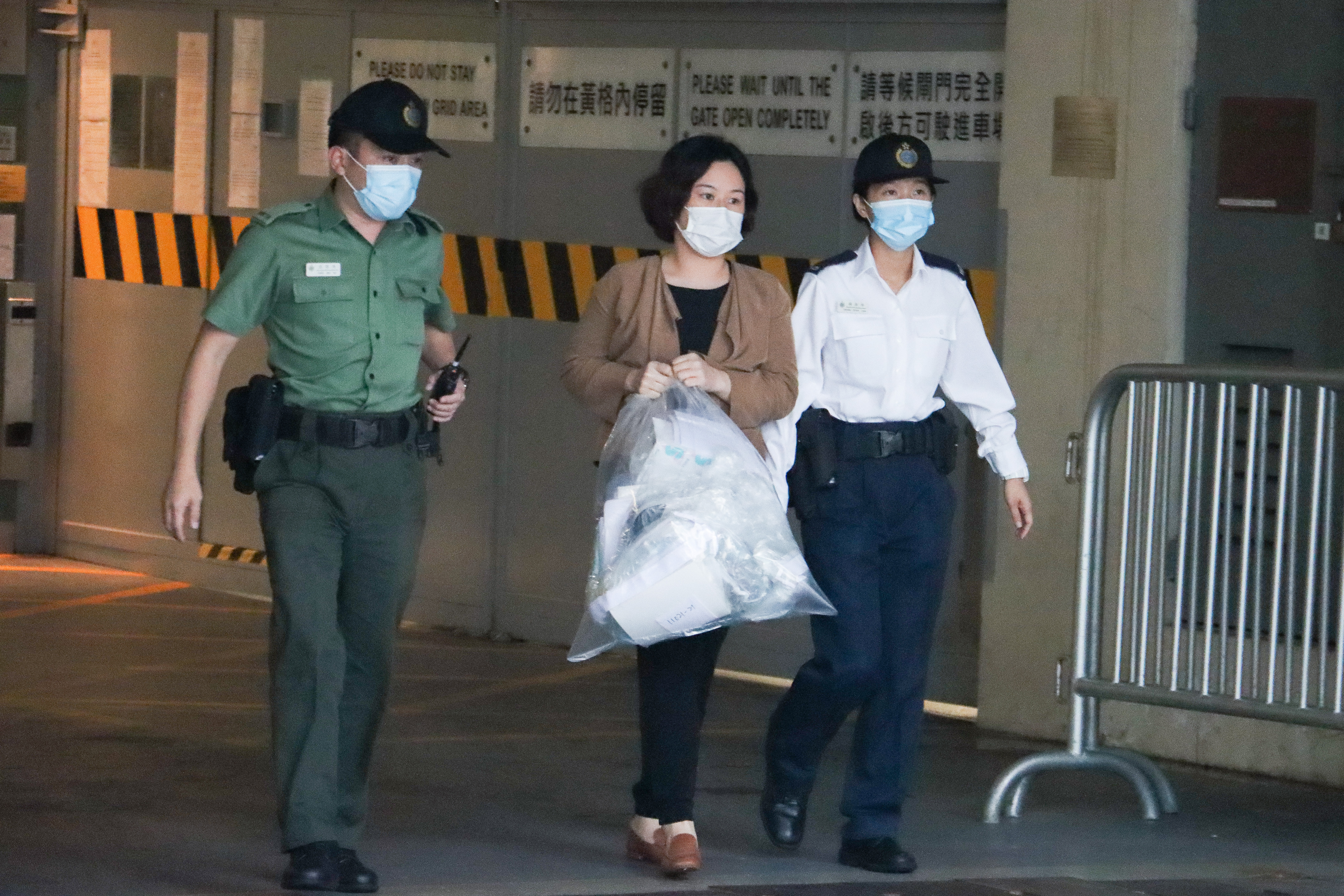
Yu seen leaving the court after bail granted

On 28 February, Yu was formally charged, along with 46 others, for subversion. After Yu was charged for subversion, she was suspended from her duties by the Hong Kong Hospital Authority. On 28 July, she was released on bail, after her bail application being granted by High Court judge Esther Toh. According to a written judgement that was released by the judiciary on 14 September, Toh granted her bail, observing in her written explanation that there was no evidence that Yu ever had an international connection. On 8 March 2022, one day after Yu being arrested again, her bail was revoked by a magistrate; as the application of defence for lifting of reporting restrictions was turned down, the nature of the violation of bail conditions was not immediately clear. On 30 May 2024, Yu was found guilty of subversion in the primaries case, along with 13 other defendants.
