= Kelly Tung =

Chinese politician in Hong Kong

Kelly Tung Kin-lei
- 董健莉
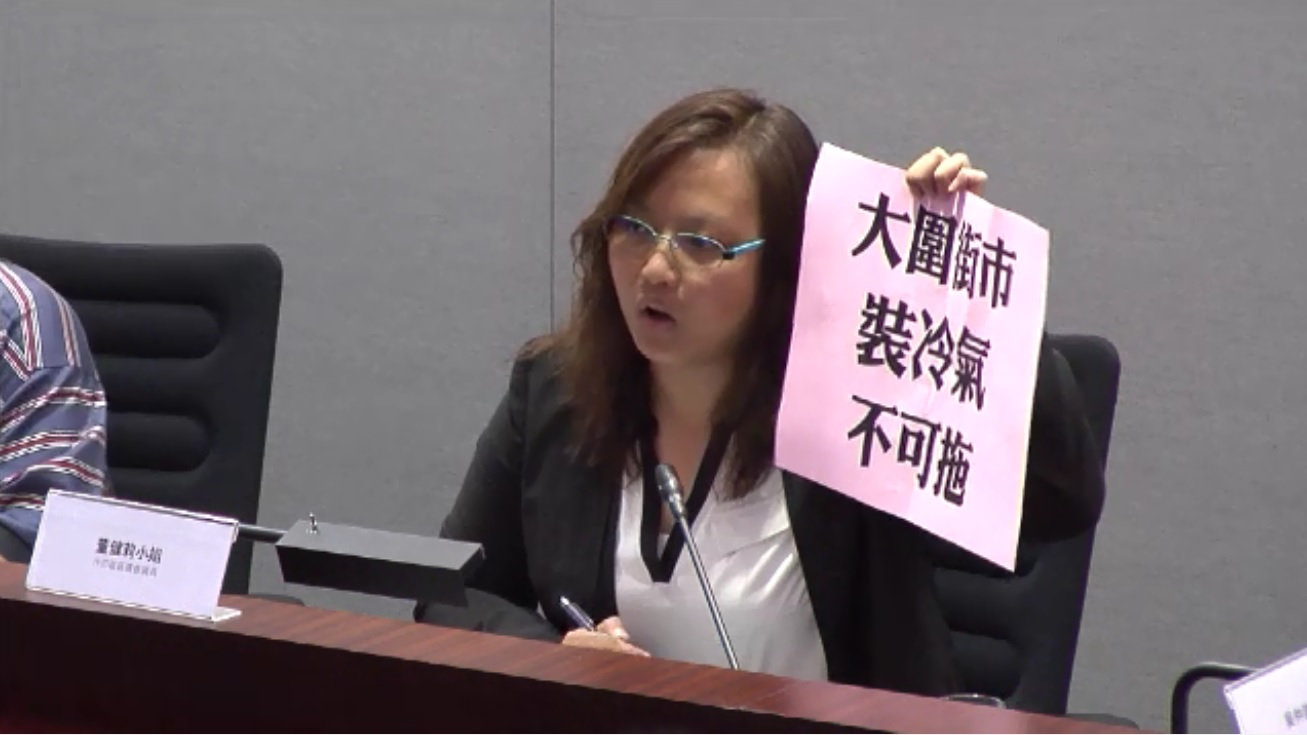
- Kelly Tung in 2015

Member of the Sha Tin District Council
- In office 1 January 2012 – 31 December 2019
- Preceded by: Leung Wing-hung
- Succeeded by: Kudama Ng Ting-lam
- Constituency: Tai Wai

Personal details
- Born: 1981 (age 44–45) Hong Kong
- Party: Democratic Alliance for the Betterment and Progress of Hong Kong
- Occupation: District Councillor

Kelly Tung Kin-lei (Chinese: 董健莉) is a Hong Kong politician associated with the pro-Beijing Democratic Alliance for the Betterment and Progress of Hong Kong. She was a member of the Sha Tin District Council for the constituency of Tai Wai between 2015 and 2019.

== Career ==
Tung held positions on various local councils prior to being elected, including the Health and Environment Committee, Education and Welfare Committee, and Development and Housing Authority. When elected, Tung served as the Chairperson of the District Facilities Management Committee.

Tung was elected to the Tai Wai constituency in 2011, beating the incumbent Neo Democrats candidate Leung Wing-hung. She was re-elected in 2015. Tung lost her District Council seat amid the surge of pro-democracy support in 2019. She was replaced by Democratic Party candidate Kudama Ng Ting-lam. Speaking about her loss, Tung alleged that she was unable to monitor the vote counting process because she was surrounded by booing voters. Since then, she had filed a petition to have the election results overturned.

== Policies ==
Tung has supported motions encouraging the public to take public transport, prevent the public feeding wild animals, and restricting the hours of construction to avoid noise pollution.

Political offices
| Preceded by Leung Wing-hung | Member of Sha Tin District Council; Representative for Tai Wai; 2012–2019 | Succeeded by Kudama Ng Ting-lam |
