= Postponement of the 2020 Hong Kong legislative election =

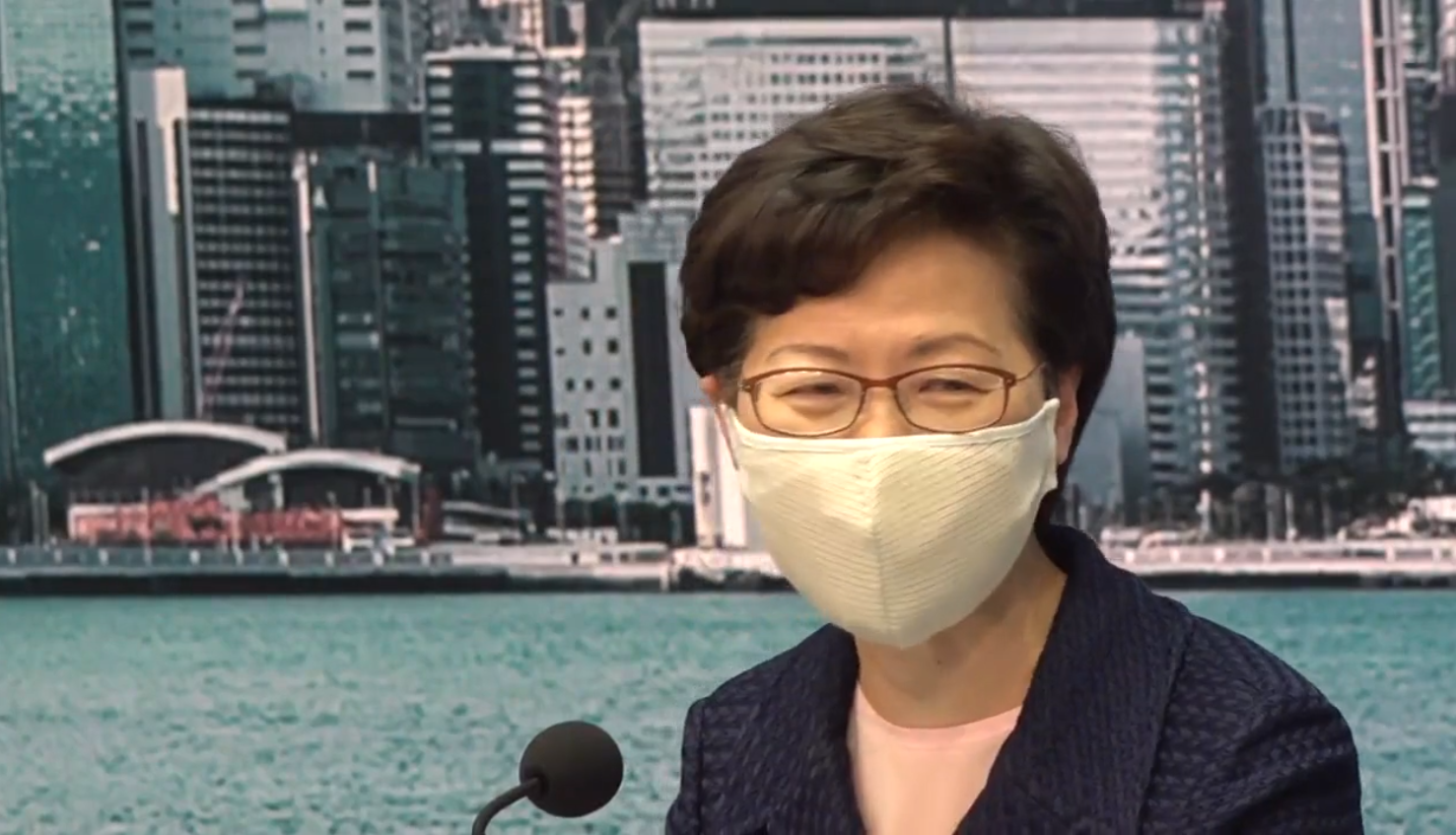
Chief Executive Carrie Lam at the press conference announcing the postponement of the election, 31 July 2020.

2020 Hong Kong Legislative Council election was originally scheduled on 6 September 2020 until it was postponed by the government. On 31 July 2020, Chief Executive Carrie Lam announced that she was invoking the Emergency Regulations Ordinance to postpone the election under the emergency powers granted to her by it, citing the recent resurgence of the COVID-19 cases, adding that the move was supported by Beijing.

Despite Lam's denial of any political calculation, the delay was seen by pro-democrats as politically motivated, who aimed to achieve a "35+" majority (obtaining more than 35 out of the 70 seats in the Legislative Council) by riding the 2019 District Council landslide on a wave of massive protests against the government and concerns about the sweeping new national security law imposed by Beijing on Hong Kong. It was also seen as the latest in a rapid series of aggressive moves by the Beijing authorities to thwart opposition momentum and neutralise the pro-democracy movement. Just prior to the announcement, 12 opposition candidates were disqualified from running in the election and four ex-members of pro-independence student group Studentlocalism aged 16 to 21 were arrested under the new national security law for making pro-independence posts on social media.

== Background ==
=== Anti-extradition protests and District Council landslide ===
2019 District Council election results map by margin of votes between pro-democracy and pro-Beijing blocs.

In mid-2019, a push by the Carrie Lam administration for an amendment of the extradition law created an unprecedented political crisis in Hong Kong. More than a million people marched against the bill in mid June, with violent clashes between the police and the protesters occurring outside the Central Government Complex on 12 June.

The protests were maintained and escalated as Lam refused to fully withdraw the bill, resulting in strong anti-government sentiment that fed into the November District Council election, where the pro-Beijing parties suffered historic defeat, losing about two-thirds of their seats. The pro-democrats jumped from around 124 to about 388 seats and took control of 17 of the 18 District Councils as a result.

The stunning results greatly boosted the morale of the pro-democrats who immediately saw the possibility of securing a first-ever majority in the Legislative Council in the 2020 election. Benny Tai, co-initiator of the 2014 Occupy protests, suggested that the pro-democrats could target winning more than half of the seats and use that advantage to block the government's bills, including expected legislation under Article 23 of the Basic Law, and to pressure the government to implement the five key demands of the protest movement. He proposed a primary within the pro-democracy camp, which was later held. He also initiated "ThunderGo plan 2.0", which mirrored his coordinating mechanism of "smart voters" in the 2016 election to strategic voting to increase the chance of the pro-democracy candidates.

=== National security legislation ===
In early 2020, the Chinese national government in Beijing reorganised the personnel of its representative organs in Hong Kong by replacing the director of its Liaison Office in Hong Kong, Wang Zhimin, with former Shanxi Communist Party secretary Luo Huining, while the Hong Kong and Macau Affairs Office director Zhang Xiaoming ceded his position to former Zhejiang Communist Party secretary Xia Baolong, with Luo and Zhang becoming his deputies. Political analysts speculated that one of the key tasks for Luo and Xia was to make sure that the pro-Beijing camp retained its majority in the legislature in the coming election.

The two Beijing agencies in Hong Kong were outspoken in urging the Hong Kong government to implement new national security law. In May 2020, the central government initiated a plan for implementing the national security law for Hong Kong which would criminalise "separatism, subversion, terrorism and foreign interference", which many interpreted as a crackdown on civil liberties, government critics, and the independence movement. Pro-democracy camp and various national governments expressed concern that the Chinese plans would undermine Hong Kong autonomy and the "One Country, Two Systems" principle. Civic Party leader Alvin Yeung said the details of the legislation show "Beijing's power is stabbing right into Hong Kong's judicial and administrative organs like a sword." He warned that "Hong Kong’s worst nightmare has been mapped out" and added that the lack of details on specific criminal actions was "extremely worrying." The National People's Congress approved the plans on 29 May 2020 and the National People's Congress Standing Committee (NPCSC) subsequently convened for drafting the details of the law.

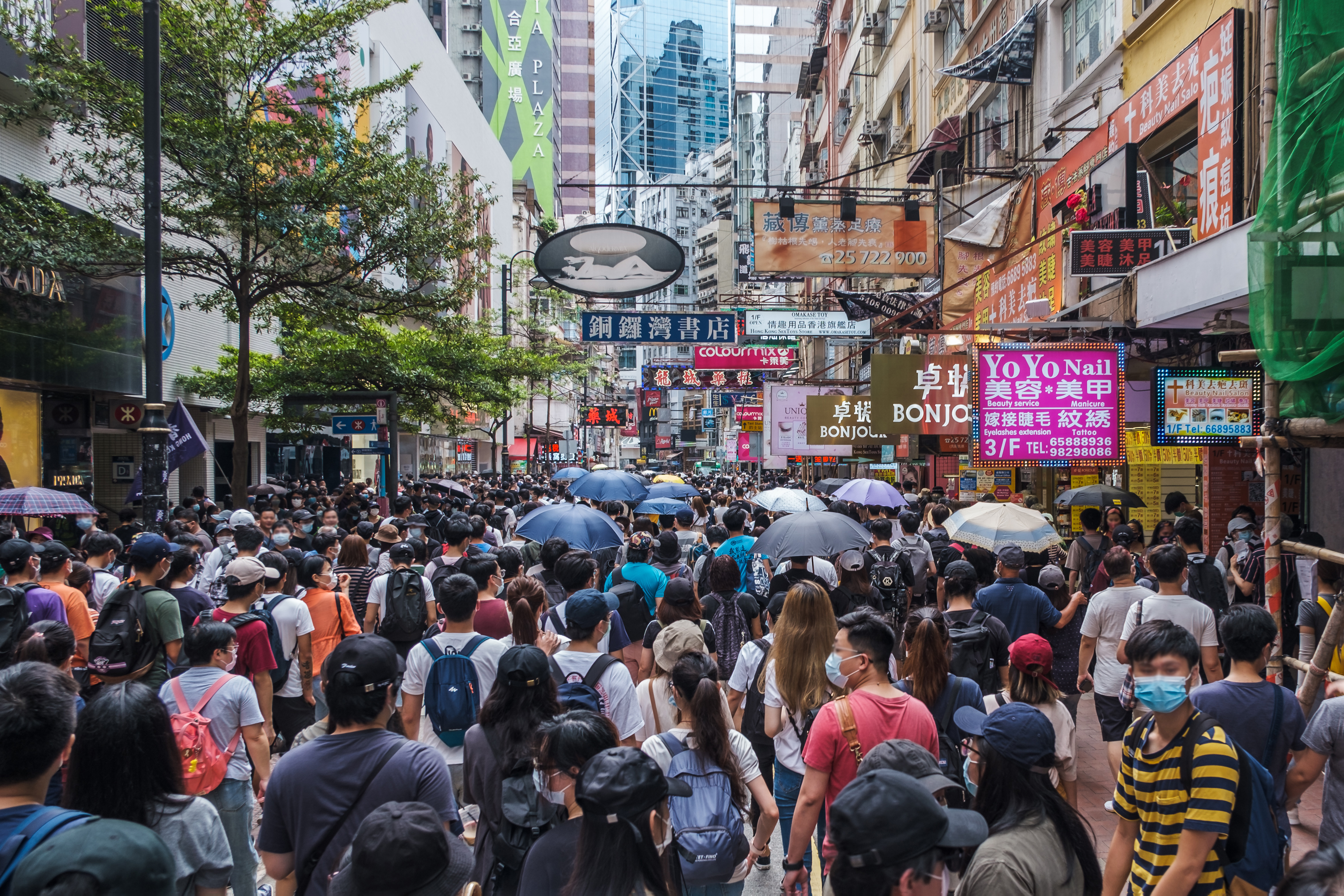
On 1 July 2020, the day after implementation of the national security law, tens of thousands of Hong Kong people gathered on the streets in Causeway Bay to march.

In June, Secretary for Constitutional and Mainland Affairs Erick Tsang suggested that anyone who opposed the coming national security law would be disqualified from September's Legislative Council elections. He said that it was everyone's duty to safeguard national security, and the imposition of security laws was "only natural". Alvin Yeung described Tsang's comments as a form of "illogical and irresponsible intimidation" of the potential opposition candidates. On 30 June, the NPCSC unanimously passed the national security law without fully disclosing the content of the law. Hours after the news, leading members of the Demosistō party, Joshua Wong, Nathan Law, Agnes Chow and Jeffrey Ngo announced their resignation from the party. Later that day, the party announced its complete disbandment, saying that the resignation of several key members in light of the national security law made it difficult for it to continue its operations. Law, the former chairman of the party, decided to flee Hong Kong and dropped out from the pro-democracy primaries in response to the security law.

On 29 July, four former members of pro-independence student group Studentlocalism aged 16 to 21, including 19-year-old Tony Chung, were arrested over the content of social media posts, which suggested they would use all means to establish an independent republic of Hong Kong and unite all pro-independence political groups. Senior superintendent of the new national security department of the police force Steve Li cited Article 21 of the security law as stating that making statements that promote secession would constitute incitement, and it is not necessary to assess if someone was actually motivated by such content.

On 31 July, Chinese state media reported that Hong Kong police had ordered the arrest of six pro-democracy activists living in exile on suspicion of violating the national security law, including Nathan Law, former British consulate staffer Simon Cheng, pro-independence activists Ray Wong, Wayne Chan, Honcques Laus, and Samuel Chu. The report said the six were sought for "incitement to secession and collusion with foreign forces".

=== Pro-democracy primaries ===
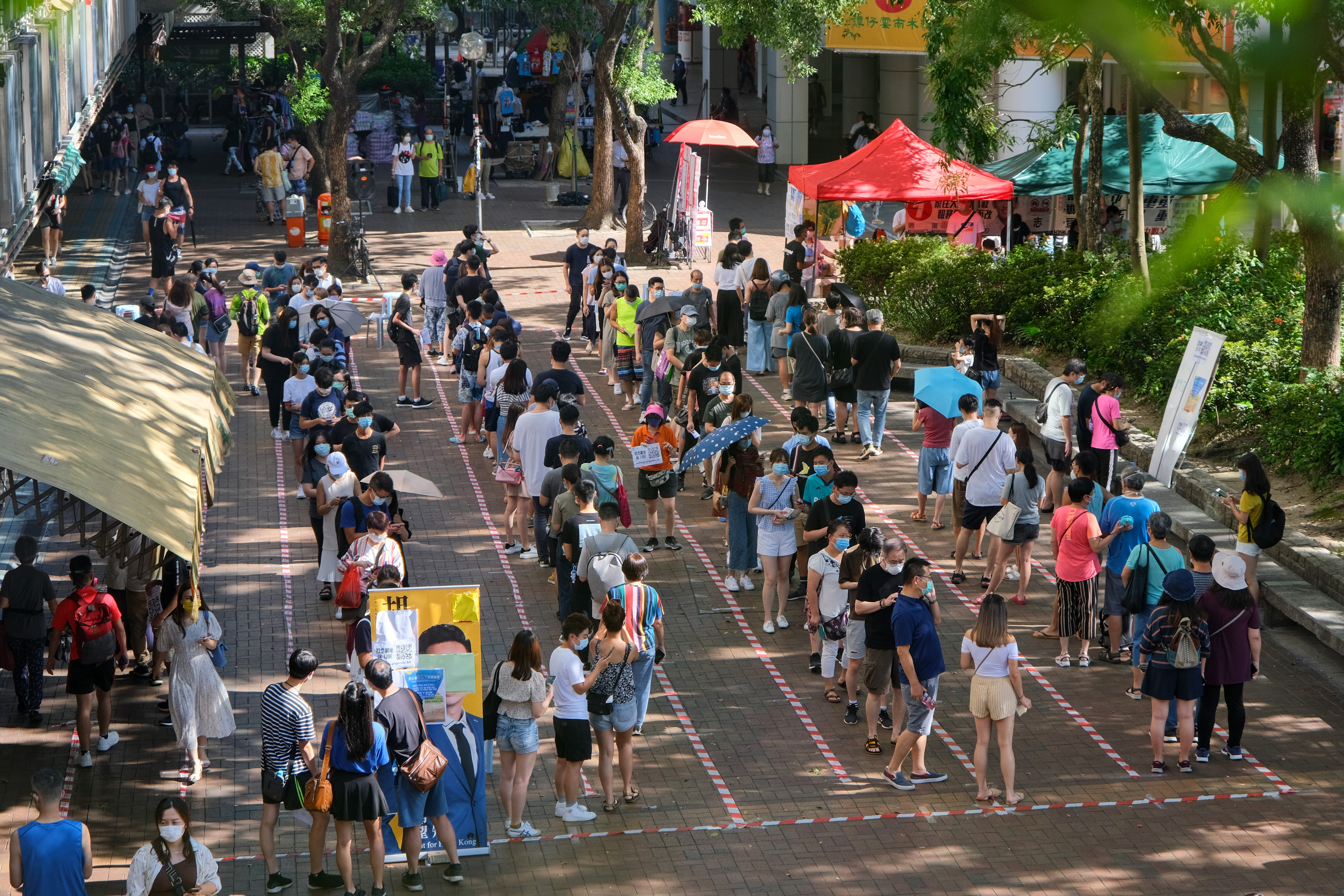
A long queue outside polling station during the pro-democracy primaries at Tai Po Plaza on 12 July 2020.

Organised by Benny Tai and former legislator Au Nok-hin and conducted by Power for Democracy, the pro-democracy primaries were held on 11 and 12 July. A total number of 52 people candidates from all over the spectrum in the pro-democracy movement participated in the primaries. Over 590,000 electronic ballots and more than 20,000 paper ballots were recorded throughout the two-day vote, more than 13 per cent of the total number of registered voters and far exceeding the organisers' expected turnout of 170,000 despite the security law and legal threats.

Traditional pro-democrat parties lost ground to localist camp parties, with many veteran democrats performing below expectations. Democratic Party incumbent Helena Wong only came seventh in her Kowloon West constituency and former legislator "Long Hair" Leung Kwok-hung of the League of Social Democrats managed only ninth place in New Territories East, for which only the top seven candidates would run in the general election. Incumbent legislator Joseph Lee of the Health Services constituency also lost to Winnie Yu of the Hospital Authority Employees Alliance, a labour union in Hong Kong. With many newcoming localists emerging on top, an unofficial six-person alliance led by former Demosistō secretary-general Joshua Wong, incumbent legislator Eddie Chu, incumbent District Councillor Lester Shum, former reporter Gwyneth Ho, student activist Sunny Cheung and incumbent District Councillor Tiffany Yuen endorsed by withdrawn candidate Nathan Law, became the biggest winner with all of them coming either top or second in their respective constituencies.

=== COVID-19 pandemic and resurgence ===
The months-long anti-government protests and the alleged initial mishandling of the coronavirus outbreak cost Carrie Lam's administration substantial public support. A Hong Kong Public Opinion Research Institute survey in late January found 75 per cent of respondents were dissatisfied with the government's response to the outbreak, while Lam's approval rating sunk to just 9% in late February, the lowest on record. In February 2020, a confidential report by Carrie Lam to the central government revealed that Lam had attempted to win back public trust and support by effective handling of the coronavirus outbreak, which she believed would enable a political turnaround for the coming election.

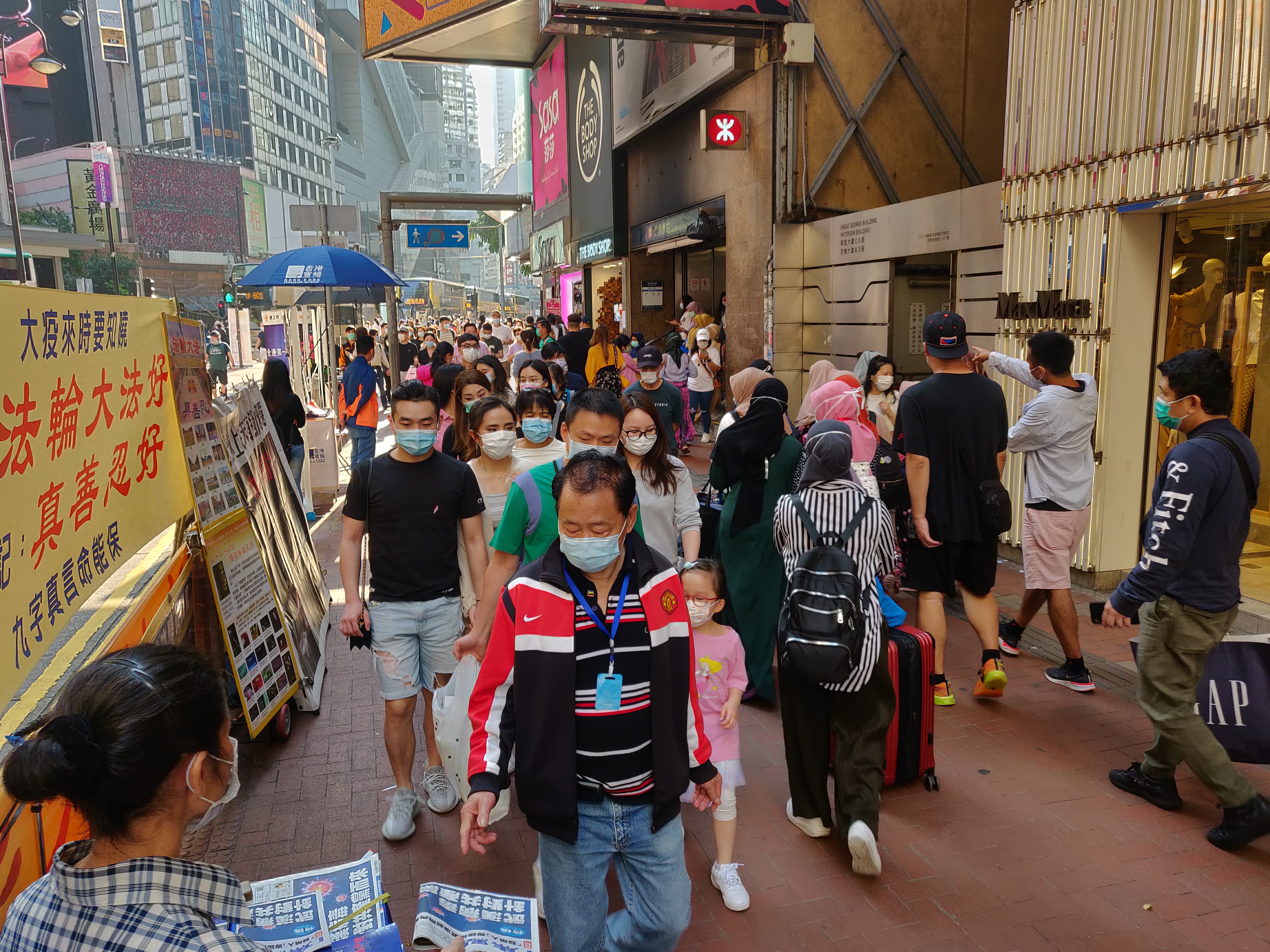
Street in Hong Kong during the COVID-19 pandemic.

On 5 May, two former Chief Executives Tung Chee-hwa and Leung Chun-ying launched a pro-Beijing alliance called the Hong Kong Coalition. The alliance was co-sponsored by 1,545 representatives of various sectors including senior politicians, former government officials, university heads and tycoons. It said it aimed to "get Hong Kong start again" by boosting the declining economy and uniting the divided society. It also announced to give away 10 million face masks across all 18 districts of Hong Kong. Political scientist Ivan Choy believed the alliance was set up as a part of the electioneering of the pro-Beijing camp in the coming election and to support Beijing's Hong Kong policy.

In mid July amid another spike of new confirmed coronavirus cases in the city, Tam Yiu-chung, the sole representative from Hong Kong on NPCSC, suggested that the government should not rule out postponing the upcoming election. Echoed by other pro-Beijing politicians, Tam said elderly people would not go to vote out of fear of being infected. He also said that many elderly people had migrated to live in the Greater Bay Area and would prefer not to return to Hong Kong to vote, given that the city implemented a 14-day quarantine requirement for incoming travellers, denying any criticism that the pro-Beijing camp was afraid of losing the election. Tanya Chan, Civic Party legislator and convenor of the pro-democracy camp in the legislature, said the pro-Beijing camp was urging the postponement of the LegCo election as they knew they would lose. She noted that many places, including Queensland, Australia; South Korea; and Singapore, had run their elections amid the pandemic earlier this year. Chief Executive Carrie Lam has defended her decision, saying that 68 countries or areas in the world delayed elections while only 49 went ahead as planned, although journalists have pointed out that the outbreak in Hong Kong was not as severe in comparison.

== Nominations and disqualifications ==
In the two-week nomination period from 18 to 31 July 2020 after the announcement of postponing the election, the Electoral Affairs Commission (EAC) received a total of 184 nominations, of which 99 were in the geographical constituencies and 85 in the functional constituencies. Two nominees on the Law Ting-fai ticket withdrew on 31 July while 12 nominees were invalidated by the returning officers.

On 30 July, one day before the end of the nomination period and the government announcement of delaying the election, the nominations of 12 opposition candidates were invalidated by the returning officers, including those of four incumbent Legislative Council members - Alvin Yeung, Kwok Ka-ki, Dennis Kwok and Kenneth Leung - as well as activists Joshua Wong and Ventus Lau. Incumbent District Councillors Cheng Tat-hung, Fergus Leung, Tiffany Yuen and Lester Shum were also barred from running, as well as former reporter Gwyneth Ho and Civic Passion's Cheng Kam-mun. The actions sparked a political storm and a round of international condemnation. The disqualifications were declared as based on either the candidates having advocated or promoted Hong Kong independence, self-determination as an option for self-determination; solicited intervention by foreign governments into Hong Kong's affairs; expressed "an objection in principle" to the legislation of the national security law; expressed an intention to exercise the functions of a LegCo member by indiscriminately voting down all government legislative proposals, appointments, funding applications and budgets, after securing a majority in the LegCo, in order to force the government to accede to certain political demands; or refused to recognise the People's Republic of China's sovereignty over the Hong Kong.

The last two days of the nomination period saw an influx of pro-democracy candidates submitting their nominations, in light of the 12 candidates being disqualified and many others' nominations still under review by the returning officers. It was widely speculated that many of these nominees were backup options for the disqualified or potentially disqualified candidates.

== Postponement ==
Emergency (Date of General Election) (Seventh Term of the Legislative Council) Regulation

Hong Kong Chief Executive in Council
- Citation: Cap. 241L
- Territorial extent: Hong Kong
- Enacted by: Chief Executive in Council
- Enacted: 31 July 2020
- Signed by: Chief Executive Carrie Lam
- Signed: 31 July 2020
- Effective: 1 August 2020

Related legislation
- Emergency Regulations Ordinance

Summary
- Regulation specifies the new election date, brings the current electoral process to an end, and deals with such matters as election expenses and donations.
- Status: In force

On 31 July 2020, the last day of the nomination period in the electoral process, Carrie Lam announced her invocation of the Emergency Regulations Ordinance to postpone the election for a whole year, citing the resurgence of COVID-19 cases.

"The decision to postpone the 2020 LegCo election has nothing to do with politics, has nothing to do with the likely outcome of this round of election," Lam said. "It is purely on the basis of protecting the health and safety of the Hong Kong people." She said that with 4.4 million registered voters in Hong Kong, the elections would involve "a large-scale gathering and an immense infection risk", particularly to elders while social distancing measures would prevent candidates from canvassing, adding that many registered voters in mainland China and overseas would be unable to take part in the elections while border quarantine measures were in place. Lam referred to the need for all elections to be conducted fairly, openly and honestly.

Under existing law, the Chief Executive can delay an election up to 14 days if the executive believes it is likely to be "obstructed, disrupted, undermined or seriously affected by riot or open violence or any danger to public health and safety." However Lam postponed the election until 5 September 2021 under the Emergency Regulations Ordinance, which gives the Chief Executive broad emergency powers to make any regulations considered to be "desirable in the public interest", claiming the uncertainty of the COVID-19 outbreak makes the 14-day delay impracticably short. As Article 69 of the Basic Law stipulates that the term of the LegCo shall be four years, meaning that the term of the 6th Legislative Council must end on 30 September 2020, the postponement created a lacuna in the Legislative Council between 30 September 2020 and the next election. For that, Lam said she had submitted an urgent report to the central government seeking its support and guidance. With respect to how to deal with the lacuna of the Legislative Council arising from the postponement, the Central People's Government would make a submission to the National People's Congress Standing Committee for its decision.

The Chief Executive in Council invoked the Emergency Regulations Ordinance to make the Emergency (Date of General Election) (Seventh Term of the Legislative Council) Regulation, which was promulgated on 1 August, officially suspending the electoral process.

== NPCSC decision ==
On 11 August 2020, the National People Congress Standing Committee unanimously passed a decision to extend the incumbent 6th Legislative Council to extend its term for no less than one year. However, it did not explain the legal basis for the extension which was in contradiction to the term limit stipulated in Article 69 of the Basic Law, neither did it mention the status of the four incumbent legislators who were barred from running by the returning officers in July. Chief Executive Carrie Lam nevertheless expressed "heartfelt gratitude" to the NPCSC which she said "demonstrates once again the care and support of the Central Government for the HKSAR."

Legal scholar Eric Cheung criticised Beijing's decision contravened Article 69 of the Basic Law, showing that Hong Kong no longer adopted the Basic Law and common law principles, but was implementing Beijing's comprehensive jurisdiction through "the legal system with Chinese characteristics". Cheung said "there's no check and balance" against the NPCSC and its "brilliant tactic" to cause in-fighting within the pro-democracy camp on whether to boycott the legislature or not. Hong Kong delegate to the National People's Congress Ip Kwok-him conceded that the decision is inconsistent with the Basic Law Article 69 but argued that it brought "the least shock" to the SAR. Pro-Beijing lawmaker Priscilla Leung defended the NPCSC decision as constitutionally valid. Leung also said Beijing's decision was giving a chance to four disqualified pro-democrat legislators as "moderate and mild" and warned them to " better behave themselves" from now on.

== Responses ==
=== Domestic ===
The pro-democrats, who had hoped to ride a wave of deep-seated dissatisfaction with the government, accused Lam of using the pandemic as a pretext to stop people from voting. Legislator Tanya Chan said she suspected pro-government politicians were more concerned about "their own election prospects" rather than "the severity of the pandemic". Joshua Wong wrote on Twitter that the pandemic was being used as "an excuse to postpone the election" and was "the largest election fraud in #HK's history." Pro-democracy legislator Eddie Chu said that Chinese Communist Party was ordering "a strategic retreat." They "want to avoid a potential devastating defeat" in the election, he wrote on Twitter.

All 22 pro-democracy legislators issued a statement accusing the government of using the outbreak as an excuse to delay the vote. They warned that doing so would "trigger a constitutional crisis in the city." The Civic Party called the postponement as "blatant manipulation", while Lam Cheuk-ting of the Democratic Party compared the situation to the Beijing-installed Provisional Legislative Council in 1996 after derailing arrangements under which members of the final term of the colonial Legislative Council before the 1997 handover were to become the first legislators of the Special Administrative Region. Pro-democrat legislators refused to join the provisional legislature on the grounds it was extra-constitutional and not democratically elected. "During an extended term of LegCo, the government may bulldoze unpopular proposals and bills such as the legislation to enact Article 23 of the Basic Law or amend the election laws to favour the pro-government camp," Lam said.

Academics raised questions over the postponement. Political scientist Eliza Lee criticised the government decision for not providing any convincing scientific evidence about risks to public health due to the pandemic or consulting the stakeholders including opposition parties. She cited a recent study conducted by the European Parliamentary Research Service that highlighted the risks created by putting off elections, including denying citizens the chance to bring about a change in policy direction, especially in nations witnessing a backslide in democracy. Lee called the one-year postponement "excessive". Political scientist Ma Ngok also said most Hongkongers believed the postponement was a political manoeuvre that had little to do with the health crisis. "Beijing and the pro-establishment camp are not sure if they can secure a majority in LegCo if the elections were held [now], especially when hundreds of thousands of their supporters cannot return to the city to vote," Ma said, referring to Hongkongers living overseas and across the border in mainland China.

The Hong Kong Bar Association expressed "grave concern" over the postponement of the Legislative Council elections for a year, saying there were "serious doubts" about the legal and evidential basis for the decision. By creating the legal problem because of the Legislative Council's four-year term limit under the Basic Law, the Bar Association said the Hong Kong government was "effectively inviting the central government to override the relevant provisions of the Basic Law and Hong Kong legislation to circumvent possible legal challenges". It added: "This is contrary to the principles of legality and legal certainty and degrades the rule of law in Hong Kong." The association was also concerned that the government had not consulted society at large or the relevant experts regarding the decision and had provided little evidence that the government had considered alternative measures, thus failing to satisfactorily explain why the election had to be postponed for a year, instead of just weeks or months.

On 6 September 2020, the original election day, thousands of protestors went on the street to oppose the postponement of the election. Nearly 300 were arrested for alleged illegal assembly, other were arrested on suspicion of assaulting the police, obstructing police officers and disorderly conduct in public place, one woman was arrested under the national security law for chanting "pro-independence slogans".

In a court judgement released on 28 May 2021 regarding the denial of bail to Claudia Mo, Judge Esther Toh wrote that the government had "submitted" that "conspiracy would have been carried out to fruition" had the election not been postponed. A similar phrase was used in at least one other court judgement from that time.

=== International ===
White House Press Secretary Kayleigh McEnany on 31 July denounced Hong Kong's government decision to delay legislative elections by a year due to coronavirus concerns. "This action undermines the democratic processes and freedoms that have underpinned Hong Kong’s prosperity," McEnany said. McEnany said Lam's invocation of her emergency powers to force the rescheduling represented "only the most recent in a growing list of broken promises by Beijing, which promised autonomy and freedoms to the Hong Kong people until 2047 in the Sino-British Joint Declaration."

U.S. Secretary of State Mike Pompeo condemned the Hong Kong government's decision to postpone the election, saying there was "no valid reason for such a lengthy delay." It also added that "it is likely, therefore, that Hong Kong will never again be able to vote – for anything or anyone" and that Beijing did not intend to uphold its commitments to the Hong Kong people and the United Kingdom under the Sino-British Joint Declaration and the Basic Law. He warned of the continuation of Hong Kong marching "toward becoming just another Communist-run city in China."

The British Foreign Office slammed the decision to delay the election. "Free and fair elections are essential to the high degree of autonomy and rights and freedoms guaranteed in the Sino-British Joint Declaration," a spokesperson said. "The Chinese government will need to reassure the people of Hong Kong and the world that elections will be held as soon as possible, and that they are not using Covid as a pretext to further undermine the autonomy of Hong Kong."

The United States' and United Kingdom's statements were followed by a joint statement of the foreign ministers of the "Five Eyes" consisting of the United States, United Kingdom, Australia, New Zealand and Canada, calling on Hong Kong to reinstate disqualified candidates and hold Legislative Council elections at the earliest. "We call on the Hong Kong government to reinstate the eligibility of disqualified candidates so that the elections can take place in an environment conducive to the exercise of democratic rights and freedoms as enshrined in the Basic Law," the statement said.

Germany announced it was suspending its extradition treaty with Hong Kong over the delay of the election and disqualification of the opposition candidates. "The Hong Kong government's decision to disqualify a dozen opposition candidates for the election and to postpone the elections ... is a further encroachment on the rights of Hong Kong citizens," Foreign Minister Heiko Maas said in a statement: "Given the current developments, we have decided to suspend the extradition treaty with Hong Kong."

The European Union High Representative issued a statement stating that the "proposed postponement by one year of the elections to the Legislative Council through recourse to emergency powers, would delay the renewal of its democratic mandate and call into question the exercise of the democratic rights and freedoms guaranteed under Hong Kong’s Basic Law." It said it was following closely the political situation in Hong Kong and reiterated that it was essential that the Legislative Council elections could take place in an environment which is conducive to the exercise of democratic rights and freedoms as enshrined in the Hong Kong's Basic Law and urged the Hong Kong authorities to reconsider the decisions.

== Stay-or-go debate ==
The NPCSC decision sparked an internal strife within the pro-democracy camp whether to stay on the Legislative Council for the extended term. Most of the fresh face candidates who won the pro-democracy primary argued against staying at the legislature as they deemed the NPCSC as unconstitutional, while the most traditional pro-democrat incumbents believed in the functions of staying on the legislature to oppose the government bills, receiving the public funding and resources and so on. After a series of debates between the factions, a citywide survey conducted by the Hong Kong Public Opinion Institute showed 47.1 per cent of the respondents voted to stay, while 45.8 per cent to leave. Pledging to abide by the result of the poll, seven Democratic Party, four Civic Party and five Professionals Guild legislators, as well as Claudia Mo, Leung Yiu-chung, and Fernando Cheung decided to stay. Tanya Chan of the Civic Party, however, announced that she would leave and resign from the party. Before the results published, incumbents Eddie Chu and Raymond Chan had also stated that they would leave. With the four legislators being disqualified over the invalidity of the by-election results and Ho Kai-ming's resignation earlier, the total number of members in the legislature dwindled to 62 as a result.

== See also ==
- 2020 Hong Kong Legislative Council mass resignations
- 2020 Singaporean general election
- 2020 New Zealand general election
- 2021 London Assembly election
- 2021 London mayoral election
- 2021 Hong Kong electoral reform
