= Michael Ho (politician) =

Hong Kong politician

Michael Ho Mun-ka 何敏嘉

Member of the Legislative Council
- In office 9 October 1991 – 30 June 2000
- Preceded by: Chow Mei-tak
- Succeeded by: Michael Mak
- Constituency: Health Services

Personal details
- Born: 6 November 1955 (age 70) Hong Kong
- Party: United Democrats (1990-94); Democratic Party (1994-2025)
- Spouse: Vera Yim Chee-siew
- Occupation: Registered Nurse

Michael Ho Mun-ka, (born 6 November 1955) is a member of the Hong Kong Democratic Party and was the member of the Legislative Council of Hong Kong (1991–2000) for the Health Services (constituency).
