= Ng Ting Lam Kudama =

Hong Kong politician

- 吳定霖

Member of the Sha Tin District Council
- In office 1 January 2020 – 8 October 2021
- Preceded by: Kelly Tung
- Constituency: Tai Wai

Personal details
- Born: Hong Kong
- Party: Democratic Party (Hong Kong)
- Occupation: District Councillor

Ng Ting Lam Kudama (Chinese: 吳定霖, aka Ng Ting-lam) is a Hong Kong politician affiliated with the Democratic Party (Hong Kong). She is a former member of the Sha Tin District Council for the constituency of Tai Wai.

== Political career ==
Ng was elected to the Sha Tin District Council for the constituency of Tai Wai in the 2019 Hong Kong District Council elections, beating incumbent Kelly Tung by 4,198 votes to 4,114.

Political offices
Preceded by Kelly Tung	Member of Sha Tin District Council; Representative for Tai Wai; 2020–present	Vacant
