= Health Services (constituency) =

Former Hong Kong functional constituency

Health Services 衞生服務界
- Former Functional constituency for the Legislative Council of Hong Kong
- Region: Hong Kong
- Electorate: 40,471 (2020)

Former constituency
- Created: 1998
- Abolished: 2021
- Number of members: One
- Created from: Health
- Replaced by: Medical and Health Services

The Health Services functional constituency (Chinese: 衞生服務界功能界別), formerly called the Health Care, was a functional constituency in the elections for the Legislative Council of Hong Kong first created for the 1988 Legislative Council election. The constituency is composed of health services related professionals with one of the larger number of electorates among the functional constituencies. It was a stronghold of the pro-democracy camp, holding the seat since its creation. It was merged with Medical into Medical and Health Services functional constituency in the major electoral overhaul in 2021.

== Composition ==
The Health Services functional constituency is composed of chiropractors, nurses, midwives, pharmacists, medical laboratory technologists, radiographers, physiotherapists, occupational therapists, optometrists, dental hygienists, audiologists, audiology technicians, chiropodists, dental surgery assistants, dental technicians, dental technologists, dental therapists, dietitians, dispensers, mould laboratory technicians, orthoptists, clinical psychologists, educational psychologists, prosthetists, speech therapists and scientific officers.

== Return Members ==
=== Health Care (1988–1995) ===
| Election | Member | Party | Votes | % |
|---|---|---|---|---|
| 1988 | Ronald Chow Mei-tak | ADPL→United Democrat | 2,866 | 54.32 |
| 1991 | Michael Ho Mun-ka | United Democrat | N/A | |

=== Health Services (1995–2021) ===
| Election | Member | Party | Votes | % |
|---|---|---|---|---|
| 1995 | Michael Ho Mun-ka | Democratic | 4,968 | 81.66 |
Not represented in the Provisional Legislative Council (1997–1998)
| 1998 | Michael Ho Mun-ka | Democratic | 11,420 | 82.21 |
| 2000 | Michael Mak Kwok-fung | Nonpartisan | 5,857 | 43.60 |
| 2004 | Joseph Lee Kok-long | Nonpartisan | 9,127 | 43.01 |
| 2008 | Joseph Lee Kok-long | Nonpartisan | 11,309 | 66.99 |
| 2012 | Joseph Lee Kok-long | Nonpartisan | 15,861 | 75.01 |
| 2016 | Joseph Lee Kok-long | Nonpartisan | 15,221 | 61.75 |

== Electoral results ==
=== 2010s ===
2016 Legislative Council election: Health Services
| Party | Candidate | Votes | % | ±% |
|---|---|---|---|---|
| Independent | Joseph Lee Kok-long | 15,221 | 61.75 | –14.26 |
| Nonpartisan | Philip Choi Pui-wah | 9,430 | 38.25 | |
| Majority | | 5,791 | 23.50 | |
| Total valid votes | | 24,651 | 100.00 | |
| Rejected ballots | | 1,195 | | |
| Turnout | | 37,423 | 69.06 | |
| Registered electors | | 37,423 | | |
| Independent hold | | Swing | | |

2012 Legislative Council election: Health Services
| Party | Candidate | Votes | % | ±% |
|---|---|---|---|---|
| Independent | Joseph Lee Kok-long | 15,861 | 75.01 | +8.02 |
| Nonpartisan | Alice Tso Shing-yuk | 5,006 | 23.99 | |
| Majority | | 10,855 | 51.02 | |
| Total valid votes | | 20,867 | 100.00 | |
| Rejected ballots | | 1,982 | | |
| Turnout | | 22,849 | 60.84 | |
| Registered electors | | 37,556 | | |
| Independent hold | | Swing | | |

=== 2000s ===
2008 Legislative Council election: Health Services
| Party | Candidate | Votes | % | ±% |
|---|---|---|---|---|
| Nonpartisan | Joseph Lee Kok-long | 11,309 | 66.99 | +23.98 |
| Independent | Wan Tak-choi | 5,572 | 33.01 | |
| Majority | | 5,737 | 33.98 | |
| Total valid votes | | 16,881 | 100.00 | |
| Rejected ballots | | 1,311 | | |
| Turnout | | 18,192 | 49.21 | |
| Registered electors | | 36,968 | | |
| Nonpartisan hold | | Swing | | |

2004 Legislative Council election: Health Services
| Party | Candidate | Votes | % | ±% |
|---|---|---|---|---|
| Independent | Joseph Lee Kok-long | 9,127 | 43.01 | |
| Ind. democrat | Michael Mak Kwok-fung | 6,396 | 30.14 | −13.46 |
| Nonpartisan | Scarlett Pong Oi-lan | 3,027 | 14.27 | |
| Independent | Siu Kwai-fung | 2,669 | 12.58 | |
| Majority | | 2,731 | 12.87 | |
| Total valid votes | | 21,219 | 100.00 | |
| Rejected ballots | | 831 | | |
| Turnout | | 22,050 | 62.21 | |
| Registered electors | | 35,442 | | |
| Independent gain from Independent | | Swing | | |

2000 Legislative Council election: Health Services
| Party | Candidate | Votes | % | ±% |
|---|---|---|---|---|
| Nonpartisan | Michael Mak Kwok-fung | 5,857 | 43.60 | |
| Nonpartisan | Wang Kwok-shing | 3,908 | 29.09 | |
| Nonpartisan | Alice Tsoi Shing-yuk | 3,668 | 27.31 | |
| Majority | | 1,949 | 14.51 | |
| Total valid votes | | 13,433 | 100.00 | |
| Rejected ballots | | 1,056 | | |
| Turnout | | 14,489 | 45.80 | |
| Registered electors | | 31,638 | | |
| Nonpartisan gain from Democratic | | Swing | | |

=== 1990s ===
1998 Legislative Council election: Health Services
| Party | Candidate | Votes | % | ±% |
|---|---|---|---|---|
| Democratic | Michael Ho Mun-ka | 11,420 | 82.21 | +0.55 |
| Nonpartisan | Choi Shek-chung | 2,472 | 17.79 | |
| Majority | | 8,948 | 64.42 | |
| Total valid votes | | 13,892 | 100.00 | |
| Rejected ballots | | 446 | | |
| Turnout | | 14,338 | 52.21 | |
| Registered electors | | 27,464 | | |
| Democratic win (new seat) | | | | |

1995 Legislative Council election: Health Services
| Party | Candidate | Votes | % | ±% |
|---|---|---|---|---|
| Democratic | Michael Ho Mun-ka | 4,968 | 81.66 | |
| Liberal | Alice Tsoi Shing-yuk | 1,116 | 18.34 | |
| Majority | | 3,852 | 63.32 | |
| Total valid votes | | 6,084 | 100.00 | |
| Rejected ballots | | 193 | | |
| Turnout | | 6,277 | 45.55 | |
| Registered electors | | 13,779 | | |
| Democratic hold | | Swing | | |

1991 Legislative Council election: Health Care
| Party | Candidate | Votes | % | ±% |
|---|---|---|---|---|
| United Democrats | Michael Ho Man-ka | Unopposed | | |
| Registered electors | | 10,636 | | |
| United Democrats hold | | Swing | | |

=== 1980s ===
1988 Legislative Council election: Health Care
| Party | Candidate | Votes | % | ±% |
|---|---|---|---|---|
| ADPL | Ronald Chow Mei-tak | 2,866 | 54.32 | |
| Nonpartisan | Lam Po-wing | 1,801 | 34.14 | |
| ADPL | Wong Lung Hang-ling | 609 | 11.54 | |
| Majority | | 1,065 | 20.18 | |
| Total valid votes | | 5,276 | 100.00 | |
| ADPL win (new seat) | | | | |
