= 2019 Yuen Long attack =

Mob attack in Hong Kong

- Part of the 2019–2020 Hong Kong protests
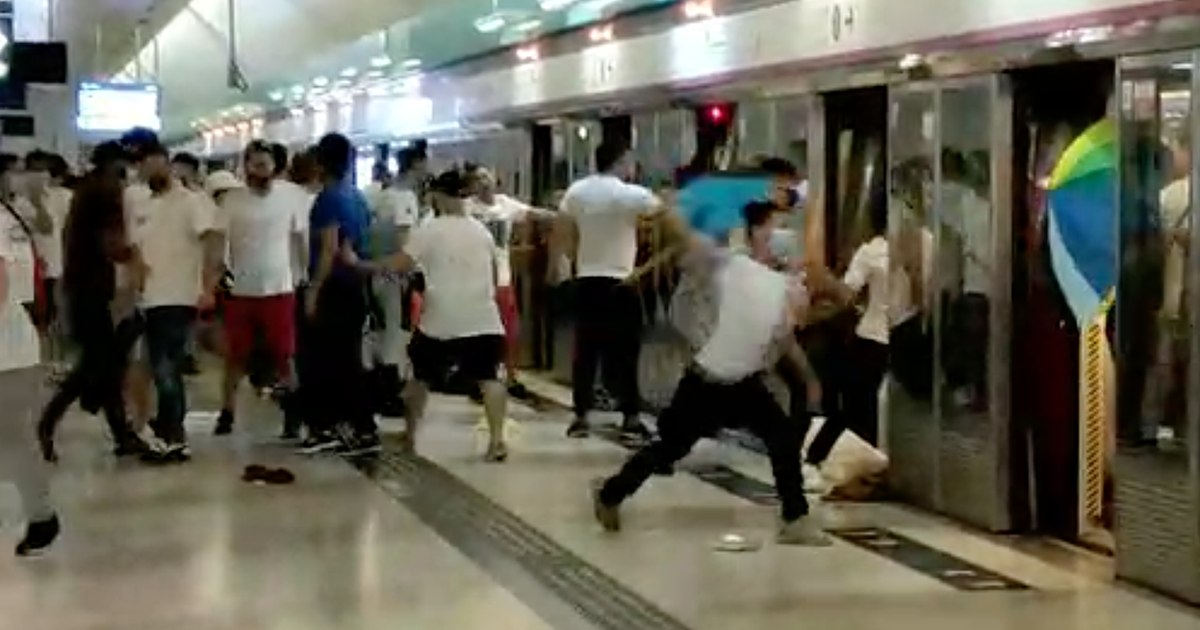
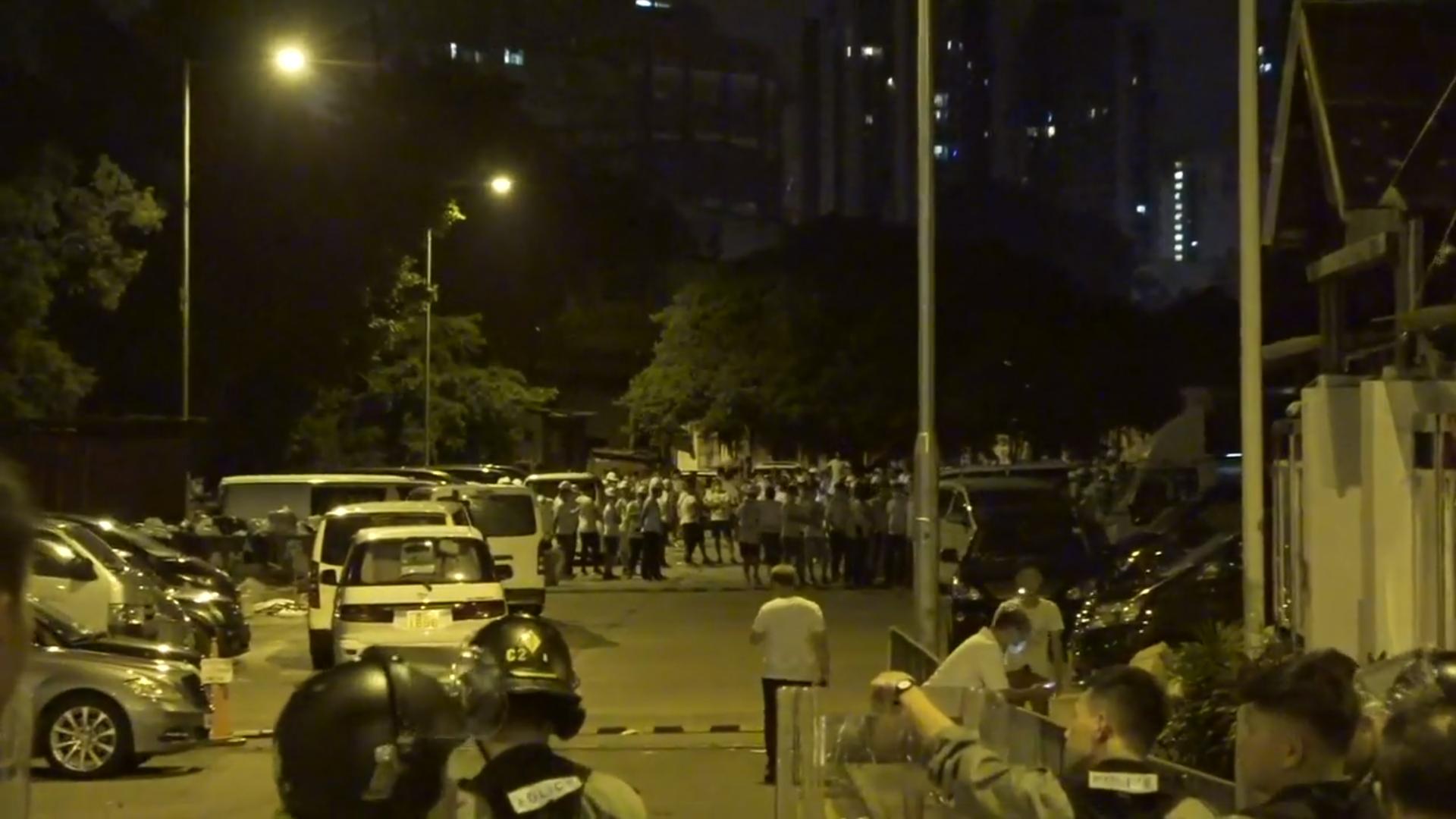
- Left: Armed men dressed in white attacking passengers on the platform of Yuen Long station Right: Mobsters in Nam Pin Wai Village
- Native name: 7·21 元朗襲擊
- Location: 22°26′46″N 114°2′8″E; Yuen Long, New Territories, Hong Kong
- Date: 21 July 2019; 20:30–04:30 (HKT, UTC+08:00)
- Target: Anti-extradition bill protesters returning from a demonstration on the same day
- Attack type: Congregation of people leading to confrontations, violent acts and assault cases (by official)
- Weapons: Various improvised weapons, including wooden sticks, handles, poles, rattan canes, steel rods, metal tubes, knives, iron pass
- Deaths: 0
- Injuries: At least 45 people (1 critical and 5 in serious condition)
- Victim: Anti-extradition bill protesters; Bystanders including train passengers, journalists, and one lawmaker
- Assailants: 600–700 (at peak) white-shirted men with triad background

2019 Yuen Long attack
- Traditional Chinese: 2019年元朗襲擊事件
- Simplified Chinese: 2019年元朗袭击事件
Transcriptions

Alternative name
- Traditional Chinese: 721事件
Transcriptions

Alternative name（3）
- Traditional Chinese: 元朗暴力事件
Transcriptions

Alternative name（4）
- Traditional Chinese: 721西鐵元朗站事件
- Simplified Chinese: 721西铁元朗站事件
Transcriptions

Alternative name（5）
- Traditional Chinese: 元朗黑夜
Transcriptions

A mob attack occurred in Yuen Long, a town in the New Territories of Hong Kong, on the evening of 21 July 2019. It took place in the context of the 2019–2020 Hong Kong protests. A mob dressed in white stormed the MTR's Yuen Long station and attacked protesters returning from a demonstration in Sheung Wan on Hong Kong Island as well as bystanders.

Despite over 24,000 calls to the 999 emergency hotline, the police arrived 39 minutes after the attacks began and one minute after the attackers had left the station. Around 30 non-tactical unit police officers were assigned to standby at Tuen Mun Police Station for contingency. At least 45 people were injured in the incident.

The government condemned the violence. There was widespread criticism of the Hong Kong Police Force for its poor response to the incident and disputed narrative of the events. As of September 2022, eight assailants have been convicted. Targetted passengers and protestors were later charged with rioting as well, with at least one found guilty. As of April 2025, 21 people have been convicted for rioting over the attack, 13 of whom belonged to the white-clad group while the remaining eight were others at the scene; seven of the latter have appealed their convictions and sentences.

== Background ==
Protests against the controversial extradition bill had been going on since March 2019. Most of the demonstrations in the days were turned into clashes. On the one hand, government supporters who favoured the extradition bill praised police as defenders of law and order. On the other hand, there is also the increase of reports alleging that the police have adopted violent strategies against the protesters.

=== Threats and warning ===
On 11 July 2019, Lei Gai-ji, head of the New Territories section of Beijing's liaison office, mobilised villages of Yuen Long to evict protestors during the inauguration ceremony of Shap Pat Heung. He offered only a smile after the attack when asked if he incited so.

Patriotic villagers shall never let rioters foment trouble in Yuen Long… must evict them if they come.

— Lei Gai-ji

Four days later Junius Ho of the Legislative Council issued similar warning to protestors over the possible protest in Yuen Long. In a response nearly a year after the attack, Ho said he was only "boasting" sentimentally.

... Now they [protestors] are calling for troubles in Yuen Long. Yuen Long shall welcome them. What would happen then? We would greet them. The more they come, the quicker you [Yuen Long villages] should act, and wipe them out.

— Junius Ho

=== 16 July Yuen Long ===
On the evening of 16 July, it was reported that some local protestors had held a public screening of video clips on the alleged police brutality in public order events at the Fung Yau Street North Sitting-out Area. Towards the end of the screening, several people dressed in white confronted the group in black. Local councillor claimed some of those in white shirt were triad members.

Soon after, there were online posts calling for people to "Liberate Yuen Long" (光復元朗) and to take part in a public meeting to be held on 21 July at Yuen Long. The identity of who first spread the information was disputed. A self-claimed police wife was said to have first posted the poster on Chinese Weibo which was then shared by government supporters. Pro-China media, on the other hand, cited police sources saying the image was published in a Telegram public group an hour earlier than the police wife. Nevertheless, the majority in the popular LIHKG forum backed the protest by Civil Human Rights Front (CHRF) in Hong Kong Island, instead of protesting in Yuen Long.

The controversial report by Independent Police Complaints Council concluded that there were online posts "calling for people to 'Liberate Yuen Long' and to take part in a public meeting to be held in Yuen Long on 21 July in protest against those disrupting the screening on 16 July; and in response online posts urged Yuen Long residents to "protect their homeland and to expel protesters with warnings of potential violence targeted at protesters".

=== 20 July ===
During the "safeguard Hong Kong" rally of the pro-China camp condemning violence during protests and showing support for police, Arthur Shek Kang-chuen, co-founder of Hong Kong Economic Times, called for action against violent protesters, likening it to disciplining children.

You should say no to those masked, black-shirted men. They have weapons, umbrellas. We can't use sticks. Do you have a cane at home? Get one, get a longer one. What if you don’t have one at home? Go to a metalware shop, buy a 20mm [diameter] water pipe, and teach your son a lesson.

— Arthur Shek

A Yuen Long indigenous resident who also joined the rally vowed "there will be a good play in Yuen Long on 21 July."

=== 21 July Yuen Long ===
According to BBC and RFA, the night before 21 July Yuen Long residents were warned by relatives of police against wearing black shirts on the day, and were told that around 500 triad members, wearing white with red bracelet, will gather at night in Yuen Long targeting black-shirted men, after Yuen Long villages decided to launch an attack.

=== 21 July Sheung Wan ===
On Sunday 21 July, the CHRF organised a protest from Causeway Bay to Wan Chai on Hong Kong Island, with black being the dress code again. Police risk assessment of the procession was relatively high. Around 138,000 people participated in the procession organised by CHRF.

Like most other processions since 1 July, it started peacefully but erupted into violent clashes between protesters and the Police outside the Liaison Office of the Central People's Government (LOCPG) in Western District from around 18:30. Many protestors, however, did not stop at the designated end point at Luard Road in Wan Chai, and continued to walk in the direction of Sheung Wan arriving at the Liaison Office of the Central People's Government in Hong Kong close to 7:00 pm. Protestors then proceeded to block roads, set objects on fire, throw eggs and black ink at the building and defaced the National Emblem on the building. The rally devolved into a violent clash between the protestors and the police. According to the police, the police force was mainly focused on the public procession on Hong Kong Island, while Yuen Long was manned on a "skeleton" basis.

== Attack ==
Stand News livestream at Yuen Long railway station during the attack

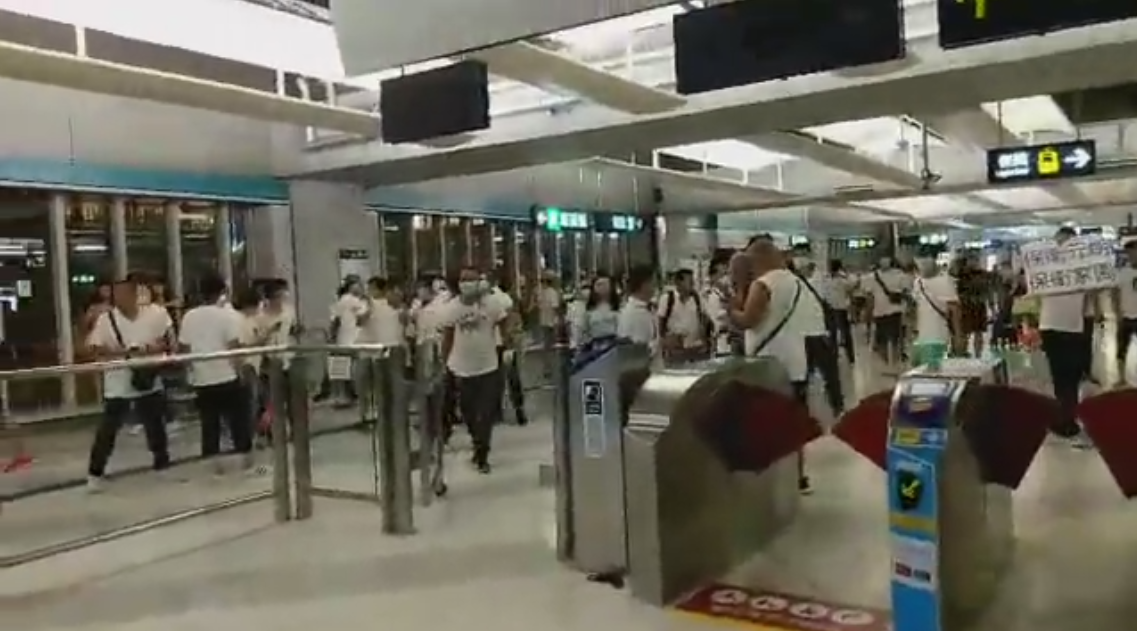
Mob opening the gate in Yuen Long station concourse

External videos
- Footage of the 2019 Yuen Long attack (SCMP)

In the afternoon, assailants wearing white shirts and armed with sticks and wooden poles gathered in Yuen Long, while a pro-government Facebook page shared a photo of them saying "the villages are ready" and about to "discipline" the protestors. Yuen Long District Councillor reported to police over the possible confrontation, police in response claimed officers were deployed.

By 10 pm, a chef, who just finished work at a restaurant despite wearing grey, was attacked by gangsters, after saying there were lots of white-shirted men. A taxi was also damaged, apparently by the gang, as four white-shirts surrounded the vehicle.

At around 10 pm, these assailants started attacking people on the street. They were reportedly targeting those wearing black clothing, the common clothing for protesters on Hong Kong Island, but also attacked journalists and bystanders. One suspected pregnant woman, wearing a long white dress, was found lying on the floor, but reports of her injuries could not be confirmed by the Hospital Authority.

At around 10:30 pm, about a hundred white-shirted assailants appeared at Yuen Long railway station and attacked commuters in the concourse indiscriminately, on the platform and inside train compartments. Two police officers arrived at 10:52 pm. However, they left the station as they judged that they were outnumbered by the assailants and did not have sufficient gear, according to the police.

Thirty police officers arrived at the station at 11:20 pm, but the assailants had left. Due to the violence, trains bypassed Yuen Long station between 10:56 pm and 11:19 pm, and the station was ordered closed at 11:55 pm. However, after midnight, white-shirted assailants forced open the station's shutters to launch a second wave of attacks on passengers. In all, at least 45 citizens were reported injured that night, including Legislative Council member Lam Cheuk-ting and two reporters; one other journalist had their equipment smashed.

Citizens made calls to the emergency hotline upon seeing the armed group assembling at around 7:00 pm, and an MTR spokesman said the first call by the MTR to the police was made at around 10:45 pm. Two police officers then arrived at 10:52 pm and left after risk assessment at scene. At 11:20 pm, 30 officers arrived to provide assistance. The local police call centre received thousands of calls between 10 pm and midnight, and some citizens could not connect to the reporting hotline as the hotlines was jammed by the sudden influx of calls. The management of Yoho Mall, a shopping centre next to Yuen Long station, also attempted to call the police but they could not get in touch with them. The police station in Yuen Long shut its gate in response to the hundreds that turned up to report the incident.

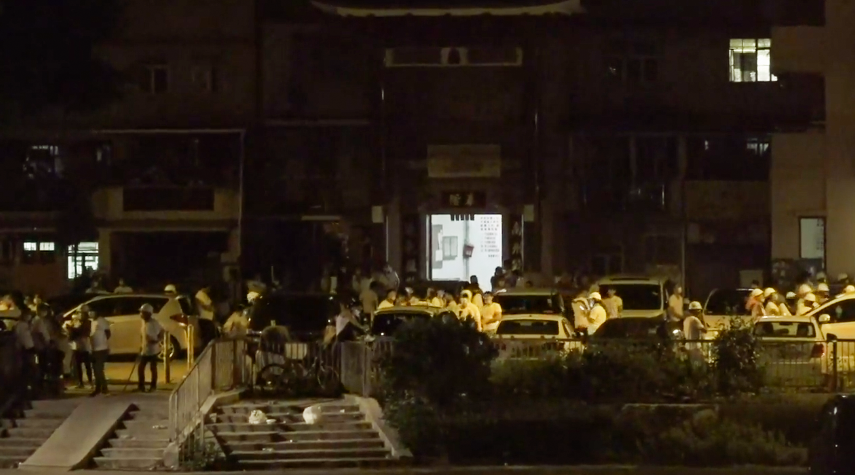
Overnight, the mobsters in Nam Pin Wai Village

Overnight, the police set up a perimeter outside Nam Pin Wai Village. Riot police attempted to enter but retreated back to the perimeter as the white shirt mob threw water bottles. Half a dozen men wearing white shirts and carrying metal rods came forward and intimidated reporters; two riot police chatted with two of them and patted one on the shoulder before letting them go. Police then entered the village, brought a white-shirted man away, but later stated he was not arrested. Around 3:55 am, the white-shirt mob started leaving either in vehicles or by walking around the police's perimeter, none were stopped or questioned by the police. As the mob left, police confiscated dozens of wooden sticks and steel rods in the car park, though no arrests were made as they claimed they "saw no one holding weapons" and "noticed nothing criminal" in the village and claimed they could not determine the identity of the white-shirted mobsters as "wearing white shirts did not mean they would the ones attacked in Yuen Long station".

== Criticism of police response ==
Gwyneth Ho, journalist of Stand News, was attacked by pro-government farmer Chan Chi-cheung. Chan was not arrested by the police.

=== Late arrival ===
An MTR spokesman said station staff saw disputes taking place at about 10:45 pm and contacted police within two minutes. However, the police officers only arrived at around 11:15 pm, when the mob was gone, despite receiving many other citizens' call to 999 for help. Residents also reported being ignored and treated rudely by 999 responders, who claimed they "should stay at home if they are afraid". Upon arrival, police were surrounded by dozens of angry residents and protesters who accused police of deliberately retreating after being called to the scene for the first assault. It was revealed by RTHK that the police had sent plainclothes officers to monitor the situation prior to the attack, but they did not intervene despite the fact that some of the white-clad men were carrying weapons in front of him.

Police commander Li Hon-man, who was interviewed at the scene by journalists, was asked why police had arrived late. He was recorded on video saying "I don't know if we were late" and claimed to not have looked at his watch. Police said later that dealing with the concurrent anti-government protests on Hong Kong Island had stretched their resources. The following day, contact information for Li had been removed from the government directory, along with removal of the details for 11 other lower-ranking officers from the Yuen Long Division.

Yuen Long District Council members including Zachary Wong and Johnny Mak had alerted the police on 20 July after they heard rumours from rural groups that a potential triad attack was about to take place. The police responded by saying that they were also alerted by the news and would deploy sufficient manpower to deal with the situation. Wong, in a radio programme, disclosed that a group of white-shirters assaulted him, but as he approached a group of police officers nearby for protection, the group of police left and drove away.

Meanwhile, leaked videos showed that two uniformed police officers had arrived on the scene but then left the station. Police responded that the two policemen had backed off and called for help as they considered that they did not have the equipment to deal with armed crowds.

=== Shuttering of nearby police stations ===
Many also criticised the fact that police stations in the vicinity of the Yuen Long attacks shut their doors, despite a large group of residents who were there to report crimes. Police replied that the shut-down was for safety reasons due to large groups of protesters surrounding the stations.

=== Apprehending suspects ===
After blocking entrances to the area for more than three hours, the police made no arrests. When queried, the police explained that it could not be confirmed that those in white were the ones who participated in the violence and that the police were unable to record the identities of those in white because of their large numbers. Yau Nai-keung, the Assistant District Commander of Crime in Yuen Long, also stated that the colleagues did not see anyone holding weapons at the area at all.

Six men were arrested on 22 July 2019. According to the police, one of the arrested suspects had a triad background. Five more men were arrested on 23 July 2019.

On 26 August, two men were charged and held without bail in relation to the Yuen Long attacks. Of the 30 people who have so far been arrested, some of whom have links to organised crime syndicates, only four individuals have been charged as suspects. Court hearings were scheduled to begin on 25 October.

As of April 2025, 21 people have been convicted for rioting over the attack, 13 of whom belonged to the white-clad group and the remaining eight being other people at the scene; seven of the latter, including former lawmaker Lam Cheuk-ting, have appealed their convictions and sentences.

=== Alleged collusion ===
Riot police next to a group of men in white T-shirts armed with sticks

Pro-democratic lawmaker Eddie Chu, representing New Territories West, stated: "Police didn't show up while thugs rampaged through the station and attacked Yuen Long residents indiscriminately last night," concluding that this meant there was "clear collusion between police and the gangs."

Triad gangsters were previously linked to attacks on democracy activists in Mong Kok during the 2014 Umbrella Movement. At that time, police were similarly accused of not responding in a timely manner and criticised for allowing attacks to occur.

=== Allegations of misconduct in public office ===
Stephen S.N. Char, barrister and former chief investigator of the Independent Commission Against Corruption, indicated that intentional negligence by police officers who refused to offer public services might have committed the offence of misconduct in public office under the common law. On 21 January 2020, eight people injured in the attack, including lawmaker Lam Cheuk-ting, announced that they had filed a lawsuit against the police force, demanding HK$2.7 million in compensation; Lam stated that the lawsuit had been filed to seek "justice for the victims and for Hong Kong".

== Allegations against Junius Ho ==
Junius Ho was seen shaking hands with a man in a white shirt on the day of the Yuen Long attack

In various videos posted online, it was observed that Junius Ho, a Hong Kong politician and a member of the Legislative Council, greeted a group of white-clothed group men, shaking their hands and calling them "heroes", giving them thumbs-up and saying to them "thank you for your hard work." At least one of the white-clothed men who shook hands with Ho has been shown to have been inside Yuen Long station during the attacks, leading to allegations that Ho was linked to the attacks. But in a video Ho posted on his Facebook page early on 21 July morning, Ho, who lives in Yuen Long, said he came across the group of men in white shirts on the street and took a picture with them.

Ho said he did not know anything about the attack when greeting them, and the meeting was before the incident. However, he also defended the mob at a press conference by saying that the incidents were a "normal reaction to protesters who brought violence to the peaceful community after they stormed the liaison office" and also praised them for "safeguarding" their district.

The Law Society, of which Ho was once president, said it had received "quite a number of complaints" and is "seriously looking into" calls for disciplinary action against Ho and "conducting reviews on relevant complaints, and will pass the matter to the Solicitors Disciplinary Tribunal if necessary."

A number of student bodies and alumni associations had openly condemned both his suspected support of the attack, and what they described as his hate speech which had damaged the image of Lingnan University. The university issued a statement afterwards, in which it denied that there was any connection between the stance of university and the actions of Ho. The statement also highlighted the university's respect for freedom of speech.

Junius Ho's office in Tsuen Wan was vandalised by the protesters after the attack. A glass partition was broken, as well as leaving memo that "suggested a link between the violent gangs that carried out the attack the previous day and the police force". Protesters also posted anti-government sticky notes on the exterior wall of his offices in Tin Shui Wai and Tuen Mun.

A group of unknown also vandalised the graves of his parents in Tuen Mun, vandals also left graffiti with words such as "official–triad collusion" and "Shing Wo" (a triad) near the graves, fuelling rumours regarding the background of the vandals.

== Aftermath ==
Many shops on the streets and in shopping malls were closed in Yuen Long and the neighbouring towns Tuen Mun, Tin Shui Wai and Tsuen Wan on 22 July 2019. Rumours spread online warned that there would be more violence on that day. Many companies allowed employees who live in the districts to leave work early that day. Some schools in the district cancelled their afternoon activities. Leisure and cultural facilities in Yuen Long operated by government closed early out of public safety considerations.

A news conference was held on 24 July by six people who were attacked and had decided to come forward with their stories. Several people in the group, including lawmaker Lam Cheuk-ting, stated they may appeal for financial compensation of damages in a court of law and file suite against the police and the MTR Corporation. Lam also said that his political party would assist any others who wish to press charges and seek redress.

=== Reclaim Yuen Long protest ===
Protests originally planned on 27 and 28 July in Hung Hom-To Kwa Wan, Tseung Kwan O and Hong Kong Islands West were rescheduled or postponed to make way for a Reclaim Yuen Long action on 27 July. However, the police issued the Letter of Objection, saying the proposed anti-mob march might 'create serious obstruction to the roads and pose a danger to marchers', after receiving pressure from the rural groups. The applicant announced he would instead walk alone along the originally proposed route and urged people not to follow him. Despite the risk of committing the unlawful assembly offence, tens of thousands of people, or 288,000 as the original march applicant estimated, turned up in the town. Many protesters marched on Castle Peak Road. The police fired tear gas in the evening, including near residential areas. The police insisted that the tear gas shot did not affect the seniors living in an elderly home nearby, though photos showed otherwise. Starting from 5 pm, the police fired canisters of tear gas upon protesters near Sai Pin Wai village and Nam Pin Wai Village, while protesters hurled objects in return. While MTR had arranged special trains in Long Ping station to help protesters to leave Yuen Long, riot police began dispersing protestors at around 7:30 pm, using batons and rubber bullets. Protesters fleeing to Yuen Long station were followed by the Special Tactical Squad, and a standoff occurred inside the station.

In the protest, a passenger car near Nam Pin Wai was vandalised by the protesters. Several weapons were discovered in the car that looked the same as the weapons brandished by the white-shirted men in the 21 July attacks, as well as a hat that resembled the uniform of Mainland law enforcement. On 28 July, police arrested the car owner for possession of weapons. Online rumours arose regarding the identity of a personal name that was found on a bill inside the car, claiming that person was connected to the Liaison Office, which the Liaison Office denied.

In April 2022, activist Max Chung was sentenced to 16 months after having pleaded guilty to organising the unauthorized Reclaim Yuen Long protest of 27 July 2019.

=== Monthly Yuen Long sit-ins ===
On 21 August 2019, thousands of demonstrators staged a sit-in protest at Yuen Long station to demand justice and to remember the victims of the mob attacks that had occurred exactly one month prior on 21 July. On the 21st day of each month, citizens staged sit-ins or assemblies in Yuen Long, especially inside Yuen Long station or the neighbouring YOHO Mall.

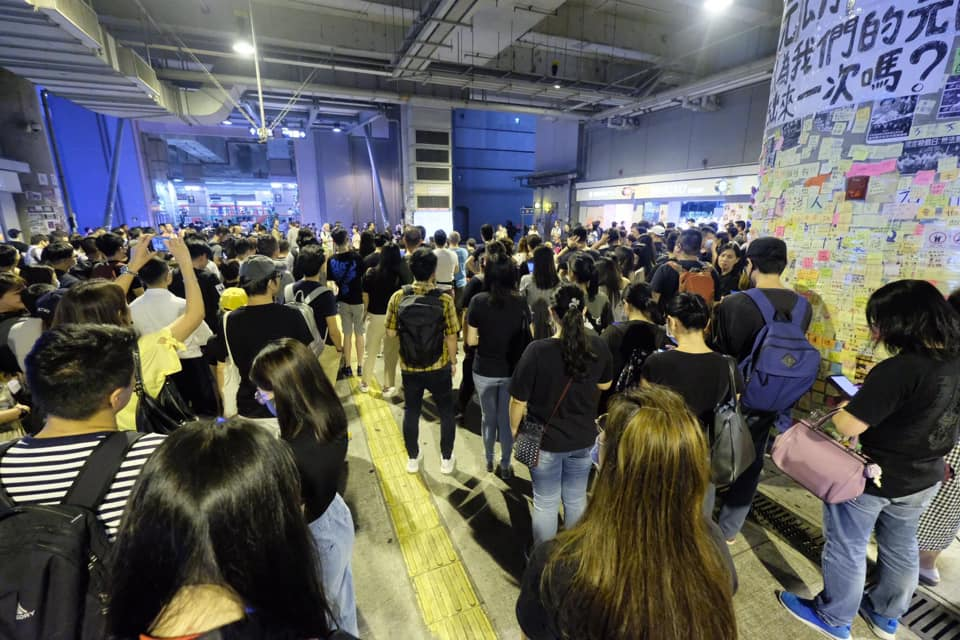
21 August 2019 sit-in at Yuen Long station

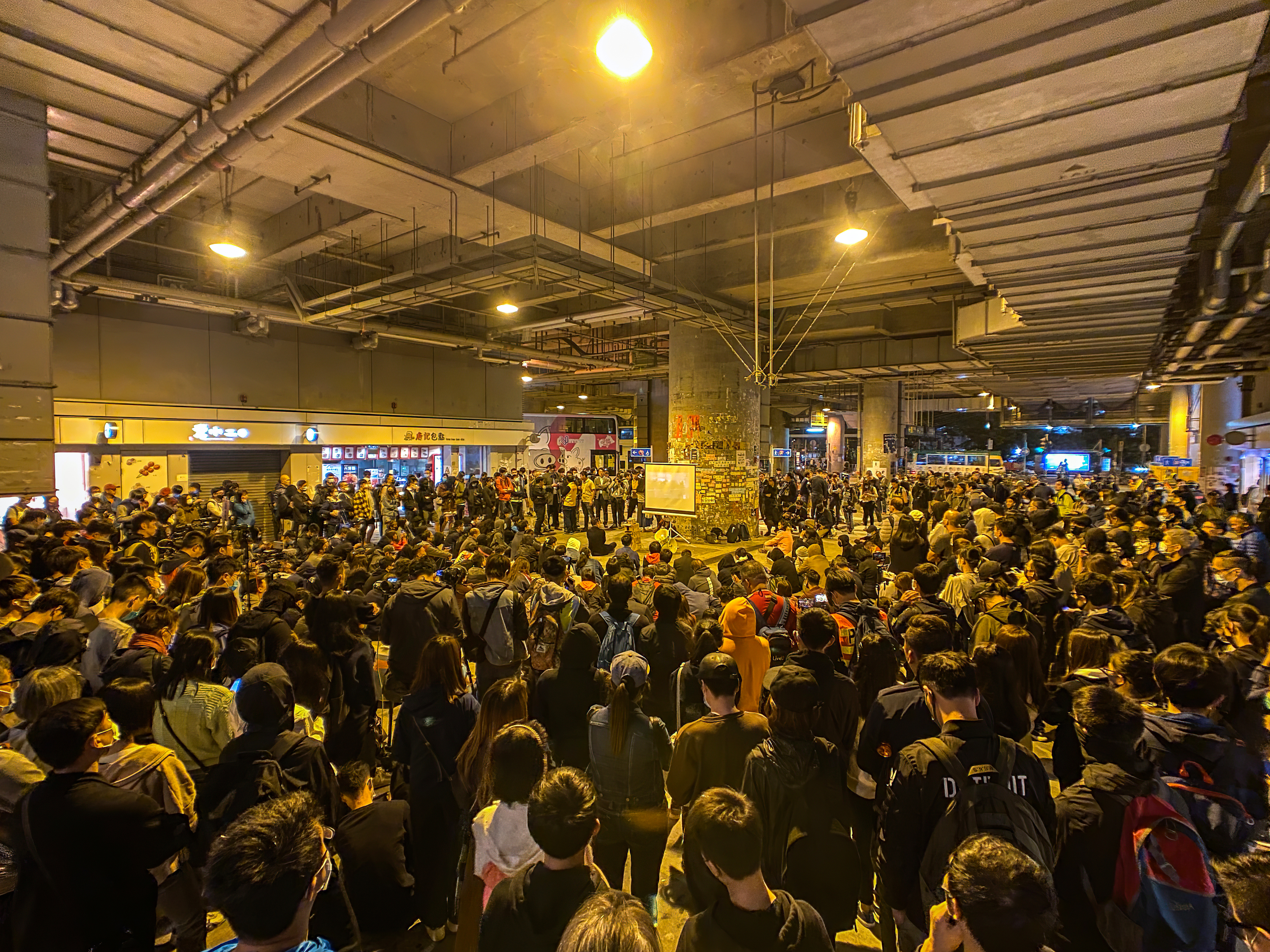
21 January 2020 assembly at Yuen Long station

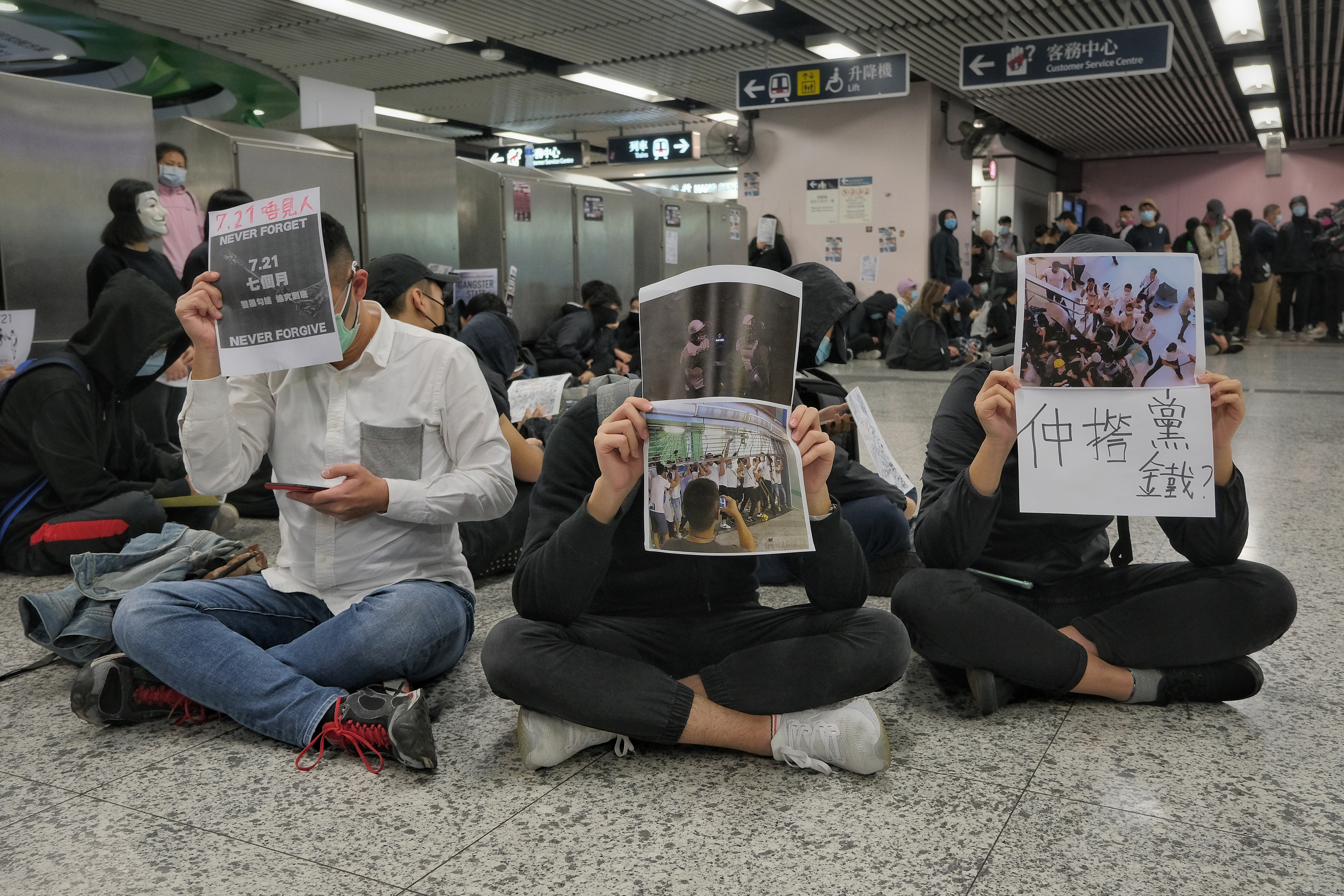
Sit-in on 21 February 2020 inside Yuen Long Light Rail stop

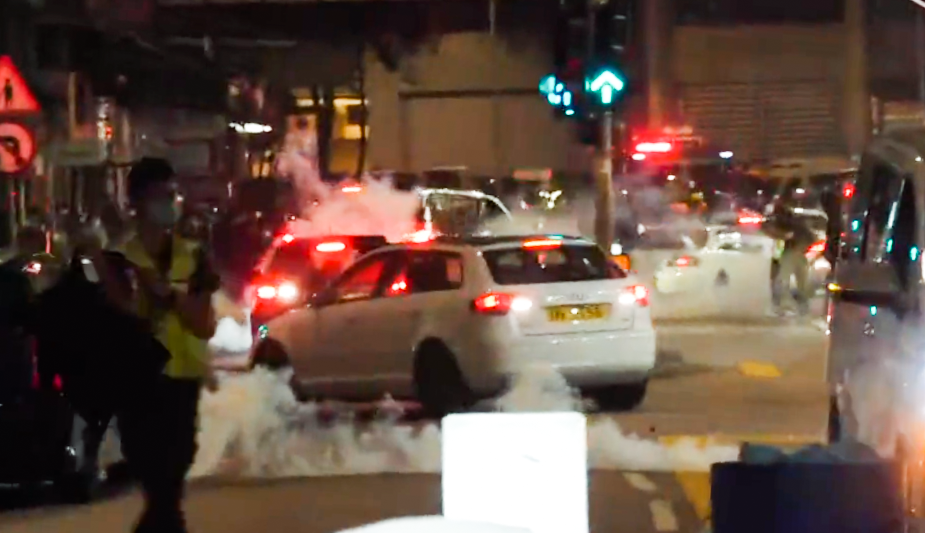
On 21 March 2020, police fired tear gas in Yuen Long

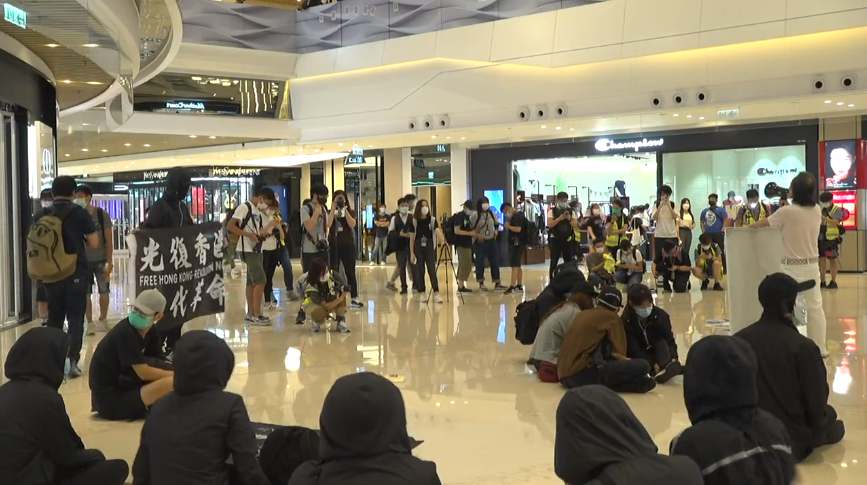
On 21 April 2020, people gathered in YOHO Mall

=== Narrative by police ===
While the police and the government initially recognised that the incident was "violent" and "shocking", as the attackers assaulted the commuters inside the Yuen Long MTR station, the police attempted to reshape the narrative in their favour over the following year. The police force refused to apologise for its slow response, despite recognising that the police's response that day had failed to live up to the public's expectations. After the retirement of Stephen Lo, the new police commissioner, Chris Tang, said that the incident only became heated when lawmaker Lam Cheuk-ting arrived at the station stirring up the confrontation. The police's account aligned with that of Junius Ho's and pro-Beijing group's accusation that Lam intentionally stirred up the conflict, intensified the tense atmosphere and eventually caused a "fight". Superintendent Kong Wing-cheung later echoed Tang's statement, saying that the attack started because "a group" had led the protesters to Yuen Long, though he later backtracked by saying that it was only his "personal observation". The Independent Police Complaints Council, which was controlled by pro-Beijing individuals, concluded the Yuen Long attack had been a "gang fight". Lam Cheuk-ting was arrested on 26 August 2020 for "rioting" for showing up in Yuen Long station on 21 July 2019, in addition to another non-violence related charge pertaining to events of 6 July 2019. The police, on the day of Lam's arrest, further changed the account and said that the incident was a clash "between two evenly matched rivals", alleged that the photo evidence and reporter commentary were "one-sided", and that the attack was not indiscriminate.

According to the footage recorded that day, the white-clad attackers had already congregated and attacked pedestrians outside Yuen Long station before Lam had even arrived. Fellow lawmaker, Wu Chi-wai, commenting on Lam's arrest, added that "the prosecution is 'calling a deer a horse' and twisting right and wrong". Lam was a victim of the attack as he was assaulted by the white-clad attackers that day inside the train compartment. Following the incident, he required 18 stitches for a mouth wound.

In the 2020 IPCC report, the police claimed the incident was instigated by "a gang fight involving a sizeable number of participants from both sides," which was met with rebuttals. Members of the Yuen Long District Council criticised the police of rewriting history. Lawyer Antony Dapiran accused the police of "gaslighting of the highest order". Clifford Stott, who was once an IPCC's consultants, said the police were trying to write "their own history of 2019" that fit with their "ideological position of portraying the protest crowds as irrational mobs". Gwyneth Ho, a former Stand News reporter who was assaulted by one of the white-clad men while livestreaming during the attack, added that any attempt by the police to distort the facts would be futile because the event was among the most live-streamed incidents of 2019.

=== Prosecution of suspects ===
In July 2021, seven of the charged were convicted and sentenced to terms between three-and-a-half to seven years. In September 2022, an eighth man was convicted for his role in the attack.

==== Criticism of prosecution ====
The police failed to arrest the perpetrators adequately immediately following the attack. The role of Junius Ho in the attack was not investigated, and the police did not invite the victims of the attacks to identify the suspects. As of 28 July 2020, 58 people, aged 18 to 61, have been arrested, and 15 of them were charged with rioting. The Department of Justice has since been criticised by some lawyers for making "politically motivated" prosecutions, since assailants of the Yuen Long attack had not been charged several weeks after the event, while young protesters in the ongoing protests were charged with rioting within several days. Six months after the attack, most shops in the area had not been contacted by police for evidence.

In February 2021, judge Eddie Yip accused lead prosecutor Anthony Chau Tin-hang of glossing over important facts, such as who started the attacks.

The Yuen Long attack was widely considered to be the turning point of the protests, as the police's inadequate response and alleged collusion with the triads crippled people's confidence in the police and turned a lot of citizens who were politically neutral or apathetic against the police. Amidst frustration that authorities had refused to prosecute pro-government violent counter-protesters and being increasingly distrustful of police, some protesters became more radical.

=== Charges against investigative journalist ===
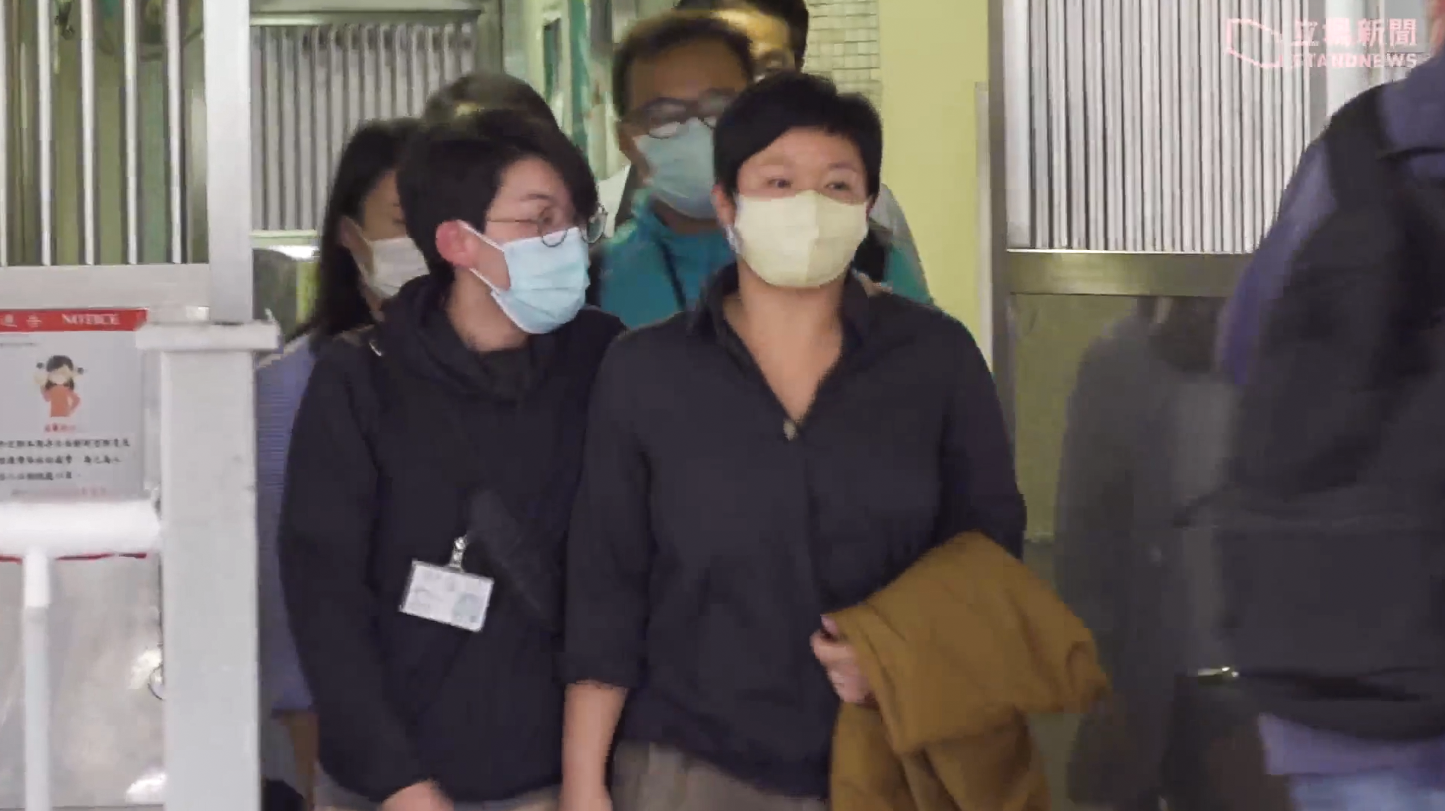
Choy Yuk-ling arrested by police, 2020

Choy Yuk-ling (also called Bao Choy), a freelance journalist who filmed a documentary about the mob attack on pro-democracy protesters for Radio Television Hong Kong (RTHK) was arrested by police on the evening of 3 November 2020, charged with misusing a government vehicle licensing database and making false statements to obtain information and records about car owners. She tried to discover the owners of a few vehicles suspected of supplying weapons to the attackers who launched an indiscriminate attack on scores of people. The owners of cars were identified as rural village leaders. She checked a box to declare that the vehicle registration searches were for "other traffic and transport related matters". Other options available when accessing the database are "legal proceedings" and "sale and purchase of vehicle". While the previously available option "other purposes" had been scrapped, the magistrate said that Choy should have considered other means to obtain the information. Police dismissed allegations that the arrest was an attack on press freedom. Choy said, "Whatever speculation there is, [it] will cause concern in the news industry. I don't think there is any benefit to the Hong Kong public." Secretary for Security John Lee said the investigation was "no different from any other investigation that the police have been doing, as a result of a complaint." Choy was found guilty on 22 April 2021 and fined HK$6,000. The Foreign Correspondents Club on 22 April strongly criticised the verdict as setting a "dangerous precedent" for "legal action against journalists for engaging in routine reporting". To the FCC statement, on 23 April a spokesperson from the Hong Kong Liaison Office responded by saying that the FCC statement had "openly vilified the SAR Government and trampled upon the rule of law on the pretext of press freedom", and that the FCC should "know [its] place". Choy was exonerated by the Court of Final Appeal on 5 June 2023.

== Reaction ==
Several politicians such as Kenneth Leung, Roy Kwong and other public figures condemned the incident as a terrorist attack.

Hong Kong Economic Times compared the attack with two terrorist attacks in mainland China in 2014, suggesting the Yuen Long attack may qualify as a terrorist attack according to the Mainland law. The newspaper also compared the attack with U.S. law, making the same conclusion.

Parties from both factions of the Legislative Council (LegCo), condemned the violence of the attack. Pro-democratic councillors signed a petition to condemn the negligence of the police in allowing suspected triads to become enforcers of their own rules, while the pro-Beijing DAB condemned the violent incident and "demanded that the police follow up on [the attack] seriously".

The injured, as well as LegCo Councillors Lam Cheuk-ting (who was also injured in the attack), James Tien, and a number of pro-democratic councillors accused the mob of being members of triad gangs. The police also believed that some of the suspects arrested on 22 July "had triad backgrounds".

Some politicians, such as Zachary Wong, Councillor of the Yuen Long District Council, accused the mob of being under the influence of the Beijing central government, citing the opinion of a Liaison Office official in an inauguration event of Shap Pat Heung Rural Committee days earlier. After the attack, Reuters also claimed that they had the audio recording of the speech of the official.

Journalists' associations condemned the attacks on journalists as "a severe infringement of press freedom".

Arthur Shek Kang Chuen, Vice-editor-in-chief of Hong Kong Economic Times and one of the executive directors of its publisher Hong Kong Economic Times Holdings, resigned on 23 July after retracting his personal opinion on encouraging the use of violence on anti-bill protesters; he expressed the opinion during an event supporting police on 20 July, a day before the attack.

There was backlash on 22 July when 30 protesters demonstrated at Yuen Long police station to condemn the attacks, the delayed police response, and the alleged collusion between police and triad gangs. Hundreds of social workers then marched to the same police station to report the violence, hand over criminal evidence and file complaints against the police.

On 2 August, Labour Party representatives held a protest outside the Government offices demanding that Junius Ho be stripped of his title as a Justice of the Peace. Along with a petition of 20,000 signatures, the Labour Party chairman said Ho was unfit to hold the position as he had incited others to use violence.

Billionaire Robert Tsao became disillusioned with China because of the Yuen Long attack. He said that during a dinner, a top Chinese official told him "the way to proceed was to hire hooligans to work with police officers to beat up protesters, then Hong Kongers would not defy the Chinese government." Tsao accused the police of deploying "hooligans with batons and clubs who indiscriminately assaulted protesters" and called the Chinese Communist Party a "hooligan regime".

=== Government response ===
The government condemned the attacks in a statement released after midnight local time. However, the government refused to categorise the attack as a riot.

Chief Executive Carrie Lam held a media session at 3 pm on 22 July 2019, first condemning protesters for besieging the Liaison Office in Sheung Wan the night before. In addressing why she prioritised the liaison office incident before the Yuen Long mob attack in her remarks, Lam said: "It's important that Hong Kong citizens' daily lives are protected, but I believe all citizens will agree that the successful implementation of one country, two systems is ... even the most important thing."

Lam did not directly address the media's questions about the alleged delayed response by police to calls for help. Lam ultimately condemned the organised attacks on protesters and bystanders, stating that "violence will only breed more violence." However, former lawmaker James Tien questioned her sincerity and asked if Triads were now ruling Hong Kong. In a Facebook post, he urged Lam to resign for what happened in Yuen Long that night. Commissioner of Police Stephen Lo said he needed to follow up with the incident and refused to comment at this point on the police's reaction towards mobs in this incident compared to the high-pressure approach towards protesters in earlier situations.

On 26 July, Chief Secretary for Administration Matthew Cheung apologised to citizens and admitted that the police department's response fell short of public expectations. Questioned about demands for an independent inquiry into police misconduct, Cheung said that the matter would be handled internally. Shortly after the apology, images of printed statements accompanied by warrant cards circulated on-line from dissenting police officers, questioning the need to apologise and calling Cheung an "enemy of the police." The Police Inspectors' Association and the Junior Police Officers' Association expressed "the most serious condemnation" of his statement of apology.

=== International ===
- United Kingdom – Andrew Murrison, Minister of State at the UK's Department for International Development, condemned the violence in a meeting of the House of Commons, said "I stand by people's right to protest peacefully and lawfully" and "[Britain] will be keeping a close eye on this."
- United States – Jim McGovern, member of the US House of Representatives and chair of the Congressional-Executive Commission on China, described the attack as "orchestrated violence against peaceful protesters" and urged Hong Kong authorities to protect the freedom of demonstration.
- Japan – The Consulate-General of Japan in Hong Kong issued new warning to their expatriates in Hong Kong regarding rumours of further attacks in the New Territories.

== Establishment of District Council task force ==
The pro-democracy camp won a landslide victory in the 2019 Hong Kong local elections, held later in the year. The Yuen Long District Council, previously dominated by pro-government councillors, also swung pro-democratic, with democrats taking 33 of the 39 elected seats and gaining control of the 45-seat council. The new council term commenced on 1 January 2020. On 7 January, the council passed a motion to establish a working group to investigate the mob attack. The Hong Kong Police Force refused a formal invitation to attend the council meeting. Former student leader Tommy Cheung, now district councillor for Yuen Lung constituency, was elected chairman of the task force.

== See also ==
- 2019 November shooting incident in Sai Wai Ho
- 2019 Prince Edward station attack
- Controversies of the Hong Kong Police Force
