= Stand News raids and arrests =

2021 police raid in Hong Kong

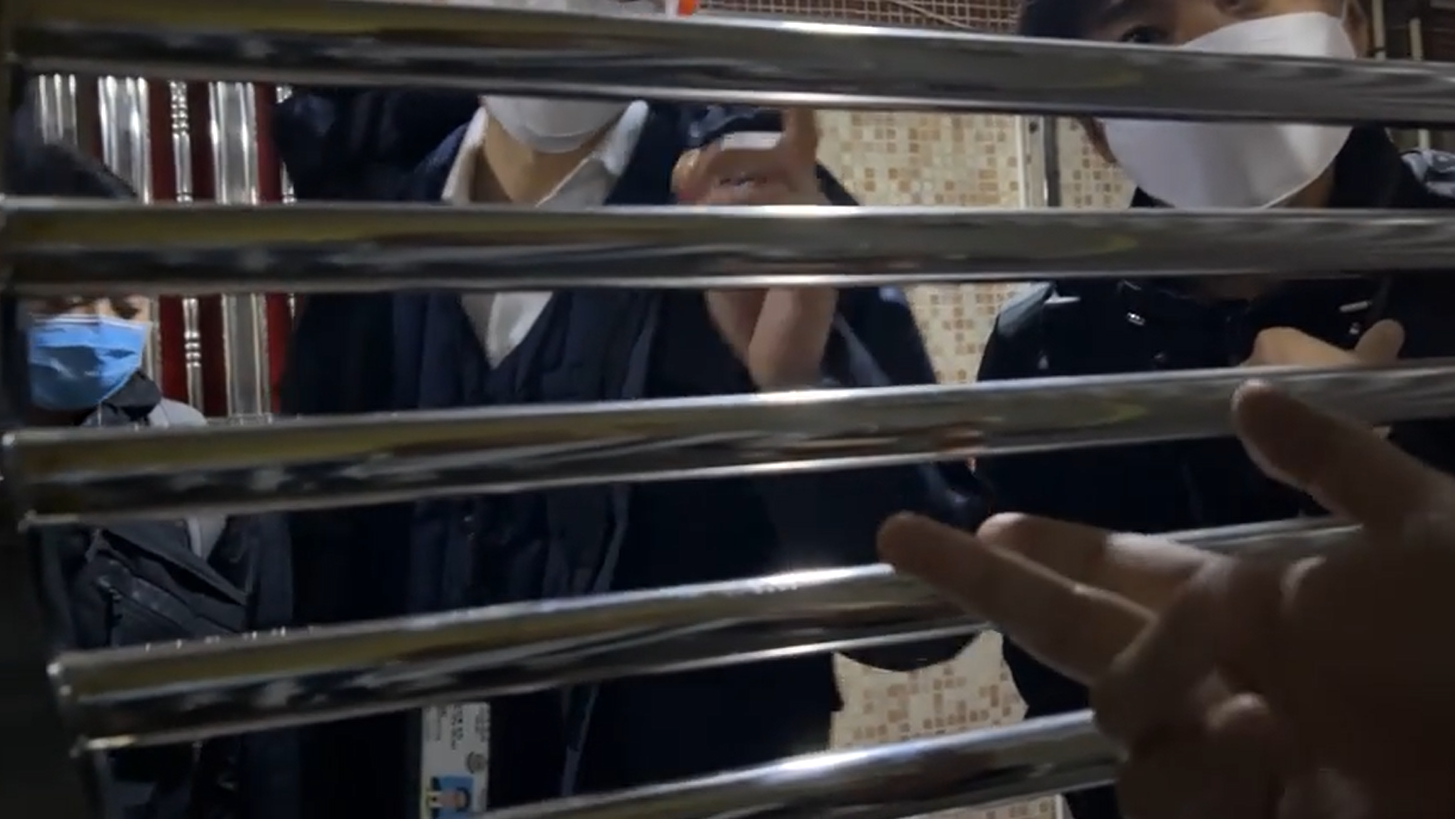
- Screenshot from Ronson Chan's live stream of the police raid on his home.
- Date: 29 December 2021
- Location: Hong Kong
- Target: Stand News
- Outcome: Publication ceased, staff dismissed
- Arrests: 6
- Charges: Conspiracy to publish seditious publications

On 29 December 2021, Stand News, one of the few remaining pro-democracy media outlets in Hong Kong following the passage of the Hong Kong national security law in 2020, was raided by the National Security Department of the Hong Kong Police Force. Media executives and journalists were arrested on the charge of "conspiring to publish seditious publications" on a large scale. As a result of the raid, Stand News ceased operations, the organisation's website and social media became inactive, and all its employees were dismissed. The Office of the United Nations High Commissioner for Human Rights, along with leaders in Canada, Germany, the United Kingdom and United States, condemned the raid.

== Background ==
Stand News logo.

Imposed by China in June 2020, the Hong Kong national security law grants widespread powers against media organisations who publish content deemed to encourage secession of Hong Kong from China, collusion with foreign powers, or subversion of the central government. Under the law, police can require publishers to remove any content that the police think is likely to constitute an offence; if the publisher does not co-operate immediately, the police can seize equipment and remove the content themselves.

On 17 June 2021, the National Security Department of the Hong Kong police arrested five senior executives of the tabloid newspaper Apple Daily, on suspicion of "conspiracy to colluding with foreign forces" in violation of the national security law. After Apple Daily was closed on 24 June, the online news provider Stand News announced on 27 June that it would be removing from its website some articles that had been published before May, and that it would stop accepting donations (to avoid loss in case its financial accounts were frozen). At the same time, six people including former legislator Margaret Ng and singer Denise Ho resigned as board members, and news editing continued to operate.

Prior to that, the government had initiated a review of operations at RTHK, Hong Kong's public broadcaster, that led in February 2021 to a report on RTHK's governance and management, criticising it of having "weak editorial accountability" Director of Broadcasting Leung Ka-wing was removed from his post six months prior to the expiry of his contract, and replaced by a career civil servant with no experience in broadcasting.

On 3 December, Secretary for Security Chris Tang criticised Stand News at the press conference of the Fight Crime Committee meeting, stating the organisation published its report on the smart prison of the Tai Tam Gap Correctional Institution to "demonise" the prison. He said that any person or organisation with "intent and an action to commit an offence" would be subject to investigation, and be charged and arrested if evidence were available. In response to Tang's remarks, the editorial department of Stand News stated that it would insist on reporting the truth, believing that "only sufficient freedom of speech and press freedom and exchanges of diverse views could help society progress and maintain long-term stability."

== Raids ==
=== Raids and arrests ===
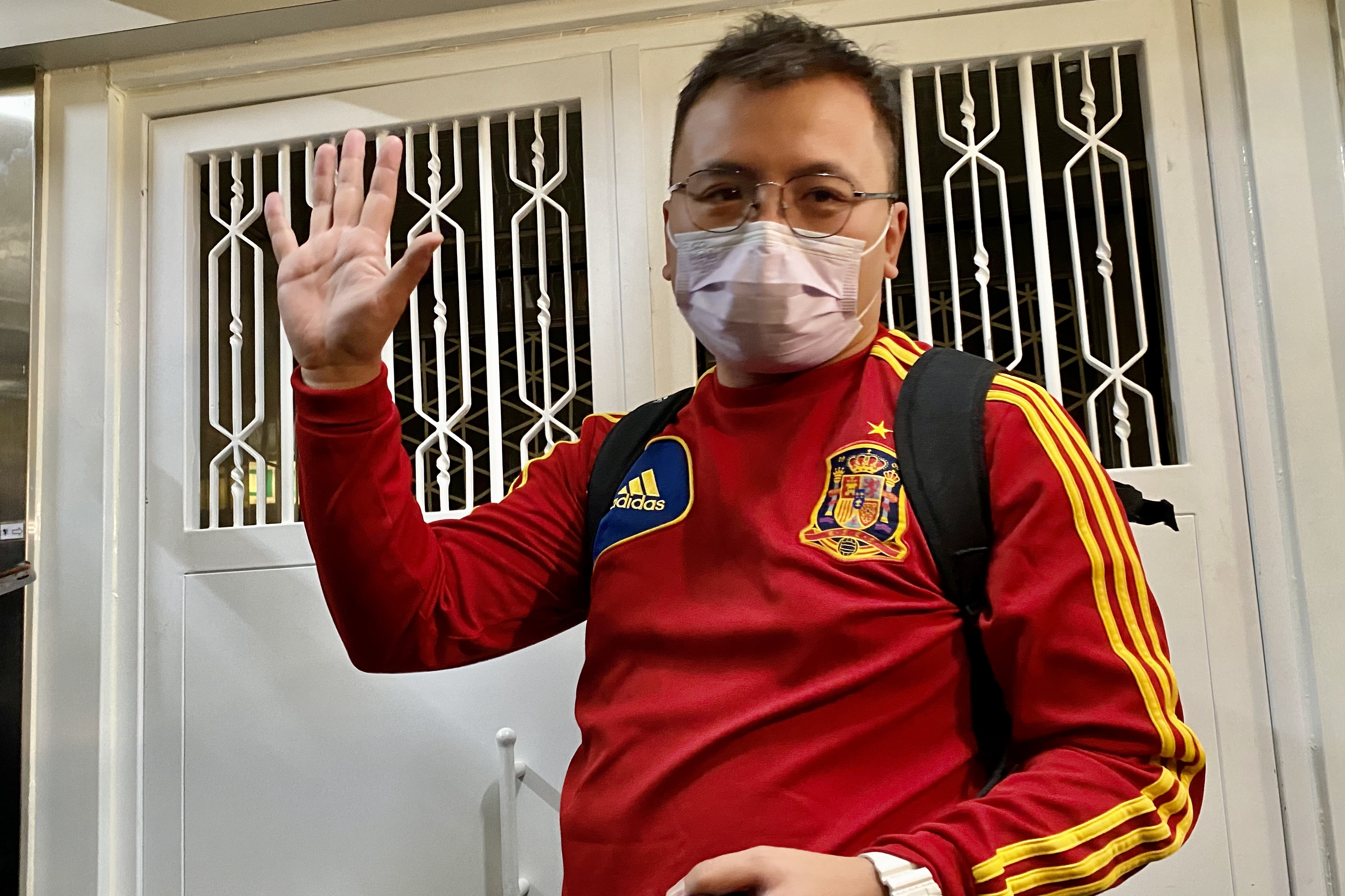
Ronson Chan waves to reporters during his visit to Stand News after the raids

At 6 a.m., on 29 December 2021, the National Security Department of the Hong Kong Police Force arrested six senior staff members of Stand News, including the former editor-in-chief Chung Pui-kuen, former legislator Margaret Ng, singer and activist Denise Ho, Chow Tat-chi and Christine Fang, accusing them of "conspiracy to publish seditious publications". Editor-in-chief Patrick Lam was also arrested at his home, and his computer, tablet computer, phone, press book and travel documents were seized. Editor and Hong Kong Journalists Association chairman Ronson Chan was also taken by police for questioning, but released hours later. Officers from the national security unit searched the premises of the arrested persons. At 7 a.m., the police alleged that they were suspected of violating Sections 9 and 10 of the Crimes Ordinance, "the crime of conspiracy to publish seditious publications", but did not explain when or which report was involved. Lam later resigned as editor-in-chief.

Full live stream of police raid by Ronson Chan

Chan live-streamed the police raid on his home on the Stand News Facebook page. He recorded a police officer holding a court warrant issued by acting magistrate Peter Law and asking to enter his residence for a search. The police ordered Chan to stop recording, or be charged with obstructing a police officer. At the same time, from 8 a.m., nearly 200 police cordoned, raided, and searched the headquarters of Stand News in Kwun Tong. Reporters were not allowed to enter or remain in the building.

In addition, Chan Pui-man, the former deputy director of Apple Daily, who was charged for violating the national security law and is currently remanded at Tai Lam Centre for Women, was also arrested for publishing seditious publications for Stand News. Chan is the wife of Chung Pui-kuen, who had previously been arrested by the National Security Department of the police unit in June 2021 for conspiracy to collude with foreign forces; her case was postponed until 24 February 2022.

After the raid finishes, Lam once looked at the reporter and wanted to speak, but the police officer pressed his head and brought a police car. By 12 p.m., Hong Kong police seized a number of computers, electronic equipment, some documents, telephones, HK$500,000 in cash, and about 33 boxes of evidence from the office, and loaded them into a truck and took them away. The police also asked Stand News to delete 5 articles in a short period of time, including the report on the second anniversary of the siege of the Chinese University of Hong Kong, an exclusive interview with former Stand News reporter Gwyneth Ho, who participated in the pro-democracy primary election, and Hong Kong citizens supporting the patriotism. It also includes about Chow Hang-tung, vice chairman of the Hong Kong Alliance, was awarded the China Outstanding Democracy Award and other reports. On the other hand, Denise Ho's Facebook page posted a message on her special page to report safety, expressing that she was fine and asks the followers not to worry. Hong Kong police also froze HK$61 million in assets related to Stand News, the largest amount frozen since the national security law was implemented.

=== After the raid and arrests ===
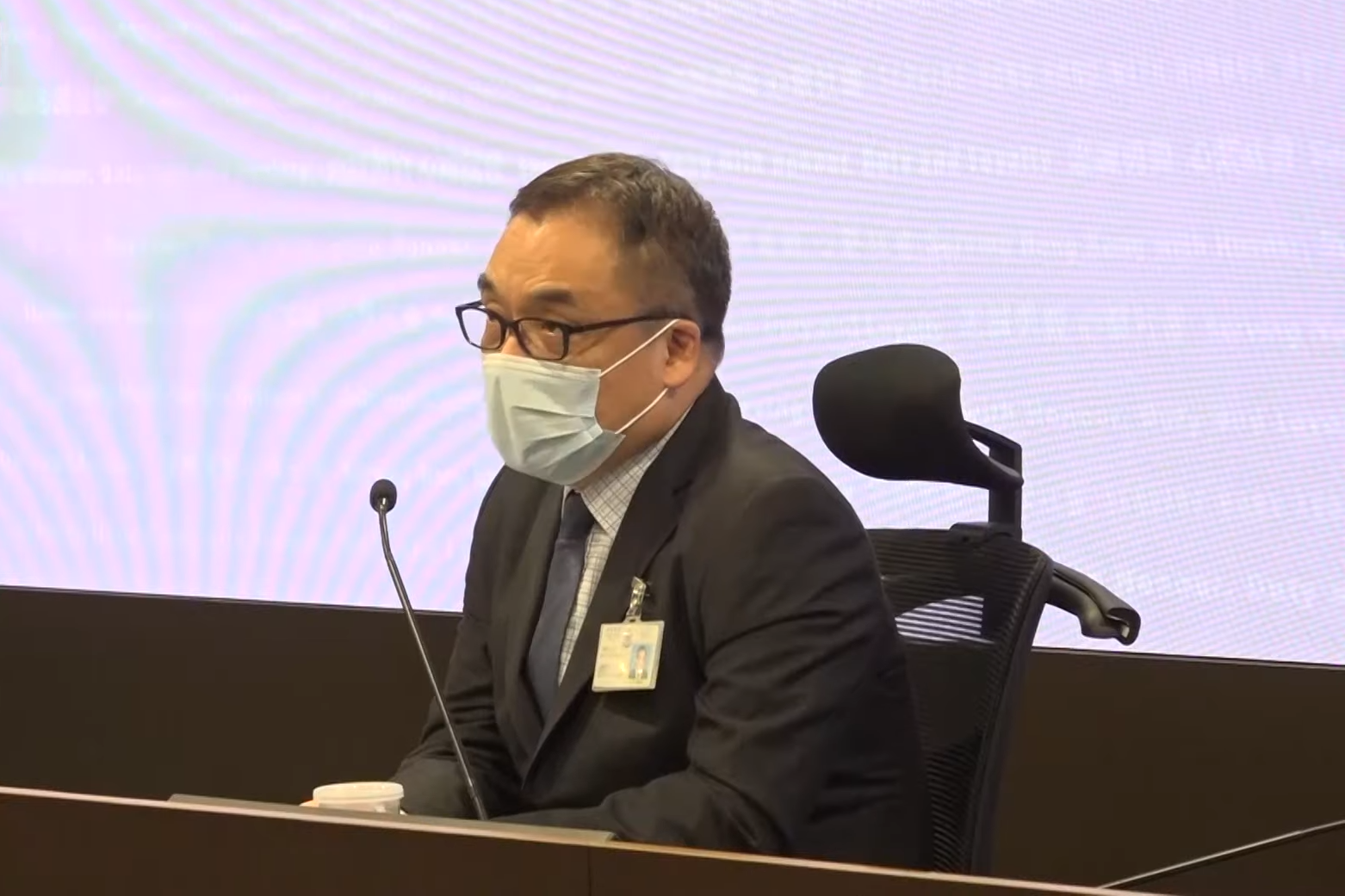
Steve Li Kwai-wah during press briefing after the arrests

At 4 p.m., Senior Hong Kong Superintendent of the national security unit, Steve Li Kwai-wah, said in a press briefing after the arrests, accusing Stand News of conspiring to publish a number of “seditious articles” and news reports that inciting hatred against Hong Kong government and the Hong Kong legal system. He cited a number of examples of "seditious articles", including describing protesters who opposed the extradition bill amendment campaign as "disappeared" and "violated", riot police "shooting" in siege at the Chinese University of Hong Kong, unintended interrogation was "a blatant abuse of power by the CCP" and called it an "example" of incitement and fake news. Some of the articles are blogs or exclusive interviews of arrested persons or fugitives, and are used for inciting secession or subversion of state power, calling for sanctions on the Hong Kong and Chinese government.

During this raid, Stand News was accused of at least 20 inflammatory reports and blog articles for violating national security law, including the second anniversary of the siege at the Chinese University of Hong Kong, interviews with Gwyneth Ho in prison, Chow Hang-tung won the "China Outstanding Democracy Award", smart prisons and other reports. Li also stated that there are blog articles that he will hold several rallies, set up delegations to lobby in different countries, and write several sanctions lists, etc. In addition, he said during the briefing that the police were investigating whether the purpose of the funds was to establish a branch of Stand News in the United Kingdom, and whether the organization had colluded with foreign forces and violated the national security law.

At 11 p.m., Stand News removed all content on various websites and social media. Its website posted a closure announcement, stating that Stand News reiterated its independence and adherence to the core values of Hong Kong's editorial policy, and thanked readers for their support.

Also on the same day, a source told The Standard that additional persons were on the police wanted list, including director Tony Tsoi and former director Joseph Lian.

On 30 December, one day after the initial raid in Hong Kong, the Stand News branch office in the United Kingdom also ceased operations.

== Legal ==
Magistrate Peter Law of the West Kowloon Magistrates Court denied bail for Chung Pui-keun and Patrick Lam. Four others—Margaret Ng, Denise Ho, Chow Tat-chi, and Christine Fang—were not charged but released on bail pending further investigation.

== Reactions ==
=== Hong Kong ===
==== Hong Kong government ====
- The Hong Kong government issued a press release stating that the police's enforcement actions against Stand News were taken strictly in accordance with the law and evidence-based. The statement emphasized that freedom of speech and press is protected by the Basic Law and the Hong Kong Bill of Rights, but freedom of speech and press is not absolute. According to the International Covenant on Civil and Political Rights, these freedoms can be restricted for reasons such as national security.
- Chief Executive Carrie Lam said the action was not aimed at media with certain positions and opposition media, but at law-based enforcement efforts.
- Chief Secretary for Administration John Lee stated that he supported the police operations, adding that anyone who made use of media work for their own political purposes are "bad apples" and "evil elements" who "pollute" "press freedom".

==== Lawmakers ====
- Election Committee member-designate, Maggie Chan supported the police's strict law enforcement, saying that any freedom is not without restrictions, emphasizing that it must be subject to national security and public order. She also believes that the national security law is not only a national law, but also activates the original laws of Hong Kong to safeguard national security.
- Kenneth Fok, a member-designate of the Sports, Performing Arts, Culture and Publication functional constituency, which is also representing the press, responded that he believes that the Basic Law guarantees the freedom of the press and freedom of speech for all Hong Kong people and media organizations, and believes that all actions are carried out in accordance with the law.
- Ambrose Lam, a member-designate of the Legal functional constituency, expressed his belief that the law guarantees freedom of the press, and hoped that the public would have confidence in the laws of Hong Kong.
- Member-designate Dominic Lee expressed his confidence in the Hong Kong police and the courts.
- Democratic Alliance for the Betterment and Progress of Hong Kong, the Hong Kong Federation of Trade Unions and other pro-Beijing political groups, jointly supported the police's operation. The latter even named a part of the Stand News report that incited hatred against the police.
- Tam Yiu-chung, a sole Hong Kong delegate of the Standing Committee of the National People's Congress, said that he did not believe that the police's raid of Stand News would have a chilling effect or a blow to press freedom.
- Horace Cheung, a member of the Executive Council, questioned the reason for the cessation of Stand News.
- The chairman of the Democratic Party, Lo Kin-hei, said that the police's arrest of the media management for conspiracy to publish seditious publications is a serious matter, which is very detrimental to social reconciliation, and urged the police to explain the specific reasons to the public.

==== Organisations ====
- The Hong Kong Journalists Association expressed deep concern that the police have "repeatedly arrested senior members of the media and searched the offices of news organisations containing large quantities of journalistic materials within a year", and urged the "government to protect press freedom in accordance with the Basic Law".
- The Hong Kong Foreign Correspondents' Club said in a statement that they are "deeply concerned" about the raids, stating that the actions are "a further blow to press freedom in Hong Kong and will continue to chill the media environment in the city following a difficult year for the city's news outlets." They urged the authorities to "respect press freedom, protected under the Basic Law and vital to the maintenance of Hong Kong's status as an international financial centre."

=== Taiwan ===
- President Tsai Ing-wen said in a Facebook post that she regrets seeing the Chinese communist authorities tear up the one country, two systems commitment and suppress Hong Kong's freedom of speech" and "Taiwan will continue to firmly embrace Hong Kong and Hong Kong people, and hopes that those arrested today will be released safely as soon as possible."
- Premier Su Tseng-chang condemns the Chinese government for failing to abide by its promises of one country, two systems.
- The Democratic Progressive Party issued a statement condemning the actions, saying that the raid by "200 plainclothed and uniformed officers" was "outrageous and dissatisfactory". It said that the raid is another example of authorities working to "stifle democracy and freedoms in Hong Kong" and tear up one country, two systems to the point of becoming a "political joke".
- In a statement issued through Facebook, the opposition Kuomintang urged mainland Chinese authorities to "respect the younger generation's view on democratic values and freedom of expression in Hong Kong". It also stated that Hong Kong was the democratic base where the founder of the Republic of China, Sun Yat-sen, and the "sages and martyrs who pursued the democratic revolution discussed the country and prepared for the revolution". The statement mentioned that the Kuomintang has always supported Hong Kong's democratic rule of law, freedom of speech, and freedom of the press, stressing that "freedom of speech is the basis for the people's diverse expression."
- The New Power Party issued a statement condemning police actions, claiming that the Hong Kong National Security Department adopted non-proportionate measures, which "seriously violates" the freedom of the press, and infringes on Article 27 of the Basic Law, which stipulates that "Hong Kong residents shall have freedom of speech, of the press and of publication; freedom of association, of assembly, of procession and of demonstration; and the right and freedom to form and join trade unions; and to strike." The party also urged the Hong Kong government not to resort to intimidation, as it "cannot alleviate the distrust of the government by Hong Kong people, and will only further distance the government and the people".
- Taiwan Statebuilding Party issued a statement stating that after the Hong Kong government used the national security law forcibly colonized by the Chinese government to eliminate the Apple Daily as a listed company and democratic media, the Hong Kong government once again dispatched a large number of Hong Kong police to search for another in the early morning to raid the office of pro-democracy media Stand News and the residence of its former executives were arrested, including Denise Ho who has always cared about social issues and defies power.

=== International politicians ===
- Antony Blinken, the US secretary of state, issued a statement calling on Chinese and Hong Kong authorities to "cease targeting Hong Kong's free and independent media" and release those arrested on sedition charges. He said that the journalists and media executives associated with Stand News have been "unjustly detained".
- Amanda Milling, the UK's Minister of State for Asia, said on Twitter that the actions "further erode freedom of speech in Hong Kong" and that the UK would continue to work with international partners to push back.
- Mélanie Joly, the Minister of Foreign Affairs of Canada, expressed concern for those arrested, "including Canadian citizen and activist Denise Ho."
- The spokesman from the German Federal Foreign Office stated that the arrests "illustrate anew that there is a steady erosion of pluralism, freedom of speech and freedom of press in Hong Kong, especially after the national security law came into force."
- South Korean foreign ministry spokesperson said that South Korean government hopes that Hong Kong will enjoy a high degree of autonomy under the principle of one country, two systems, and continue to maintain stability and development while the basic rights and freedoms of residents are guaranteed.

=== International organisations ===
- The Committee to Protect Journalists condemned the actions and considered the arrests an attack on press freedom.
- The Office of the United Nations High Commissioner for Human Rights said it was alarmed at the "extremely rapid closing of the civic space and outlets for Hong Kong's civil society to speak and express themselves freely".
- Cédric Alviani of the Reporters Without Borders East Asia Bureau called for the release of all arrested journalists, and urged other countries to act and "defend what's left of the free press in Hong Kong before China's model of information control claims another victim".

== Aftermath ==
Days after Stand News was forced to close, Citizen News – another independent, crowdfunded, Chinese-language news outlet – announced that it would cease publication in order to protect the safety of its staff. Citizen News had also been a recent target of government criticism.

A third news outlet, Mad Dog Daily, announced its closure for the same reason shortly thereafter. The publisher of Mad Dog Daily, which originated as a newspaper founded in 1996, stated that if Stand News pieces were considered "seditious" by the authorities, then Mad Dog Daily's content would "definitely" be as well.

== See also ==
- 2019–2020 Hong Kong protests
- Apple Daily raids and arrests
- Hong Kong national security law
- 2021 Hong Kong legislative election, held some days before
