= Chung Pui-kuen =

Hong Kong journalist

- 鍾沛權
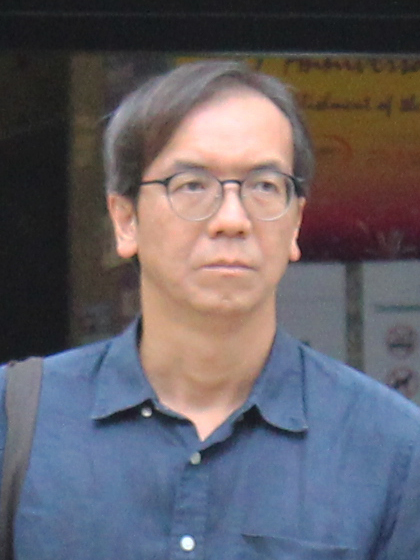
- Chung in 2024 after convicted
- Born: 1969 (age 56–57)
- Education: Chinese University of Hong Kong
- Occupation: Journalist
- Known for: Stand News chief editor
- Criminal charges: Sedition

Chung Pui-kuen (Chinese: 鍾沛權, born 1969) is a Hong Kong journalist. A former chief editor of Stand News, a defunct Hong Kong online media outlet, Chung was convicted of sedition in 2024, the first since the city was handed over to China in 1997.

== Career ==
Chung read politics and public administration at the Chinese University of Hong Kong. He was also part of the student union leadership and edited the school newspaper. After graduated in 1991, he joined Confederation of Trade Unions, the newly founded labour group, as an executive. Chung became a journalist in 1995, working in Ming Pao and later Hong Kong Economic Times as a financial reporter.

In 2012 Chung entered House News, a pro-democracy online media outlet, as the editor-in-chief until it shut down two years later. When Stand News, successor of House News, was established around half a year later in late 2014, Chung continued as the inaugural chief editor. He was also once a member of the board of directors. Announcing the launch of Stand News, Chung wrote that the outlet would stand up for values such as democracy and human rights, hence the name, and vowed to speak up for the powerless.

During his nearly seven years in office, Stand News saw a surge in popularity and creditability, especially for its coverage of Hong Kong's democracy protests in 2019. Opinion polls conducted by the Chinese University in 2016 and 2019 placed Stand News as the most credible online media.

== Trial ==
After Apple Daily, another opposition-friendly media, was raided by the national security police and subsequently forced to close down in June 2021, Stand News was under increasing pressure. Chung resigned as the chief editor on 6 November 2021, citing his family.

Less than two months later, Chung and other top managers of Stand News were also arrested by the national security police, on suspicion of publishing seditious articles inciting hatred against Hong Kong and Chinese governments. Chung and Patrick Lam, who became interim chief editor following his resignation, were soon charged, and jailed in custody for nearly a year. The pair was bailed out by court in December 2022.

During his trial for sedition, lasting nearly 60 despite scheduled for 20 days, Chung was described as the defiant face of Hong Kong's media. On the witness stand, Chung defended Stand News as a platform for diverse viewpoints and a "manifestation of free speech". He added the Stand News staff did not believe they did anything wrong and that their work would be prosecuted.

Chung and Lam, along with Best Pencil (Hong Kong) Limited, the parent company of Stand News, were found guilty in August 2024, making them the first journalists to be convicted for sedition in Hong Kong since three senior staff of Ta Kung Pao, the Chinese state-affiliated paper, were found guilty in 1952.

== Personal life ==
Chung's wife is Chan Pui-man, a senior editor at the Apple Daily, who was arrested in June 2021 for collusion with foreign forces in a separate security trial. Chan was later prosecuted and pleaded guilty, currently remanded in custody.
