= Returning Valiant =

Hong Kong pro-independence group

- 光城者
- Founded: 2020
- Founder: Choi Wing-kit
- Dissolved: 5 July 2021
- Members: ~20 (2021)
- Spokesman: Queenie Ng
- Website: Returning Valiant on Facebook; Returning Valiant on Instagram

Returning Valiant (Chinese: 光城者; lit. 'City Liberator') was a pro-independence group in Hong Kong. Formed mainly by students under the Hong Kong national security law in 2020, the group called for continuation of protests to "liberate the city".

After the first arrest in May 2021, the police declared to have dismantled the group in July, arresting members of the group for plotting "terrorist attacks" in the city. Seven members, including the founder, pleaded guilty to subversion under the security law, and were sent to correctional centres or given 5-year jail term.

== Aims ==
With the decline of the large-scale protests in 2020 following the coronavirus pandemic and the imposition of the Hong Kong national security law, Returning Valiant hoped to "adhere the aspirations of sages, keep the spark of revolution" (Chinese: 繼承先賢之志，延續革命之火), with the target of "mind enlightenment and liberation of our city" (Chinese: 開啟民智，光復我城).

Returning Valiant consisted of 20 members who referred to the group as "the embers of revolution".

== History ==
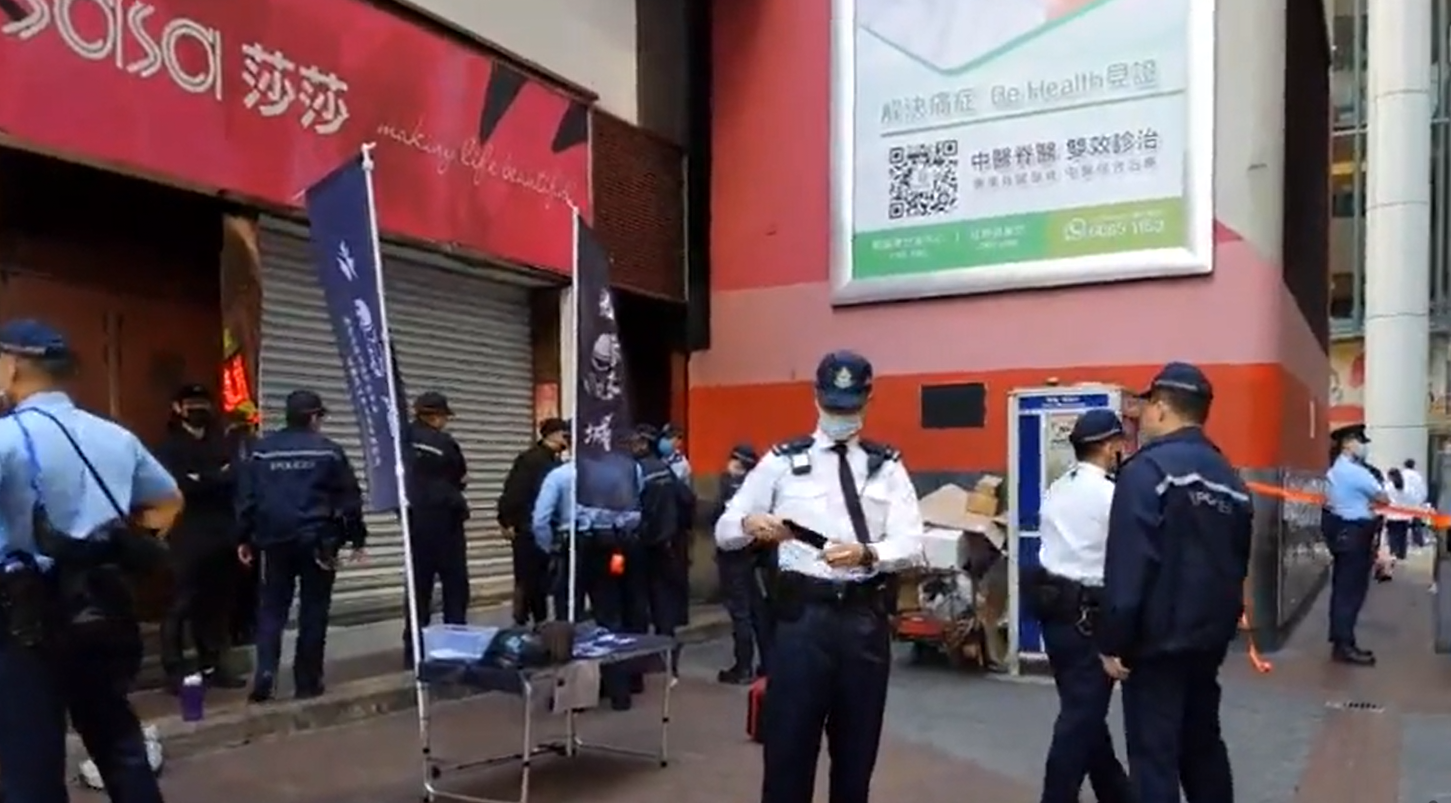
Group members probed by police in January 2021

Returning Valiant had set up street booths on 31 January 2021, sharing the history of uprisings across the world. Members were fined under group gathering ban, and were warned of breaching the security law.

On 5 May 2021, four students (Lai Chun-hei, Yuen Ka-him, Chan Ching-hing, Choi Wing-kit) were reportedly arrested on location after sneaking into Po Leung Kuk Laws Foundation College, a secondary school in Tseung Kwan O. Police, during the search, discovered some suspects belonged to Returning Valiant and hid independence slogans and banners at home, including former spokesman Yuen Ka-him. All were charged with housebreaking later and bailed out. The national security police (NSD) arrested a total of seven individuals on 5 and 6 May, five were accused of subversion but were not indicted.

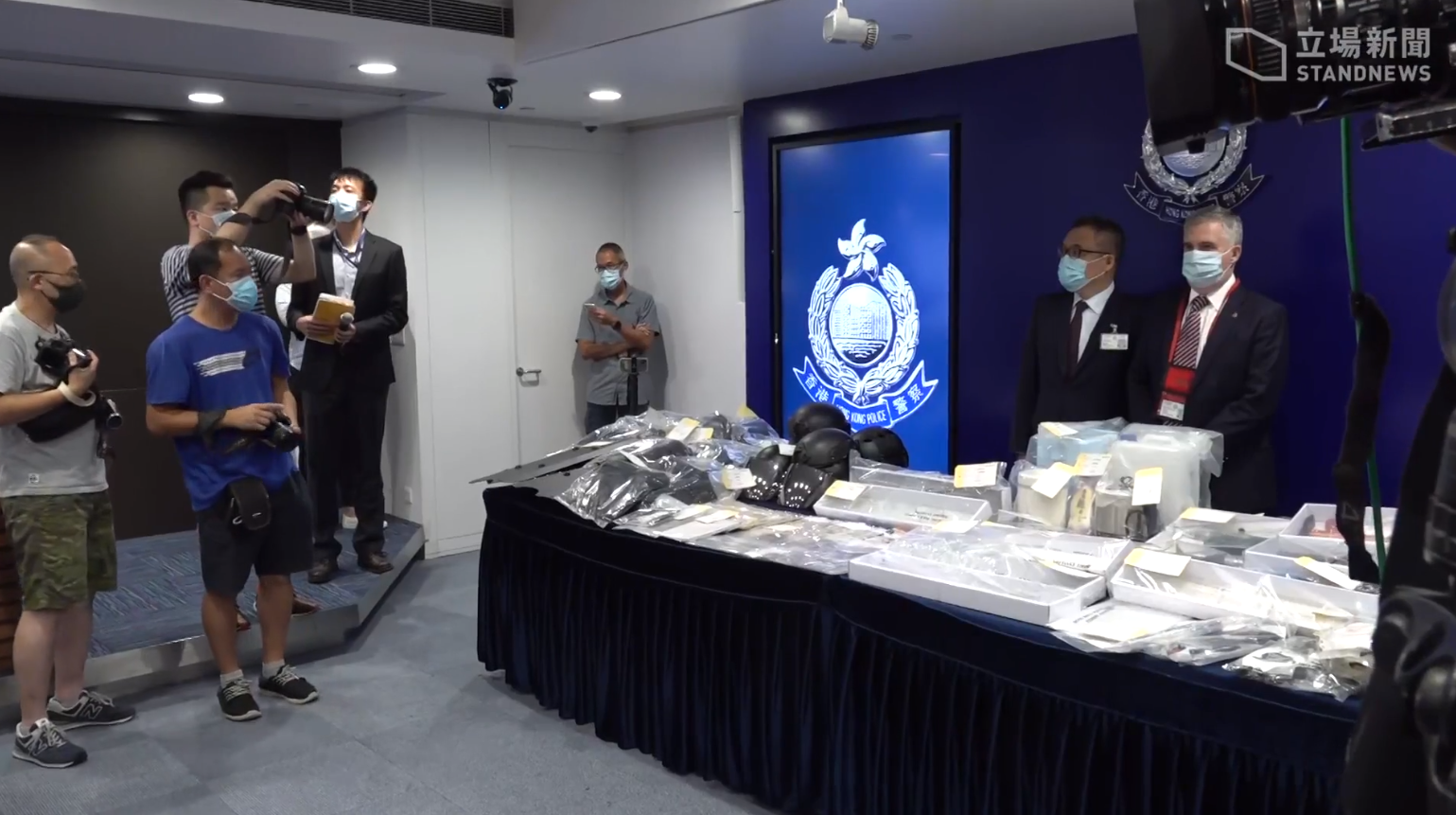
The national security police seized TATP and weapons in July 2021.

On 5 July 2021, nine members of Returning Valiant were arrested for alleged terrorist activities, six of whom were secondary school students. The NSD said the arrested had attempted to plant car bombs, attack cross-harbour tunnels, railways, court buildings, and public facilities across the city, using TATP; in a raid at a hostel in Tsim Sha Tsui, police had confiscated laboratory equipment for making that highly explosive substance. Three (Ho Yu-wang, Alexander Au Man, Chan Cheuk-hin) were charged, brought to court, and denied bail on 7 July. Others were granted bail by police. Five more were arrested on 12 July, and three (Kwok Man-hei, Chan Hoi-leung, Law Kai-wing) were charged on 14 July; they were remanded in custody, with their trial adjourned to 1 September. One more person (So Wing-ching) was charged with terrorist activities on 1 September.

On 28 September 2021, seven were arrested by the NSD and charged with conspiracy to incite subversion of state power. At least 22 arrests had been made in relation to the case by the end of 2021.

The NSD arrested a 22-year-old man on suspicion of five charges: terrorism, arson, conspiracy to commit arson, conspiracy to defraud, and money laundering on 26 October 2022. Believed to be a member of Returning Valiant and another anti-government group Black Bloc and suspected of providing financial support, he was accused of committing arson at a Tsuen Wan COVID-19 testing station in May 2021, planning to carry out an arson attack on a COVID-19 testing centre, and defrauding a bank.

== Trial ==
Members of Returning Valiant (minors when arrest italicised)
Name	Age	Charge	Verdict
Wan Chung-wai	15	Subversion	Pleaded guilty Detention at correctional facility
Yuen Ka-him	16	Subversion	Pleaded guilty Detention at correctional facility
Leung Yung-wan	16	Subversion	Pleaded guilty Detention at correctional facility
Chiang Chow Ching-yu	16	Subversion	Pleaded guilty Detention at correctional facility
Choi Wing-kit	20	Subversion	Pleaded guilty Jailed for 63 months
Chris Chan Yau-tsun	25	Subversion	Pleaded guilty Jailed for 60 months
Kwok Man-hei	18	Subversion	Pleaded guilty Detention at correctional facility
Kwok Man-hei	18	Conspiracy to cause explosions	Pleaded guilty Jailed for 30 months
Chan Cheuk-hin	15	Conspiracy to cause explosions	Pleaded guilty
Law Kai-wing	15	Conspiracy to cause explosions	Pleaded guilty
So Wing-ching	18	Conspiracy to cause explosions	Pleaded guilty
Alexander Au Man	19	Conspiracy to cause explosions	Pleaded guilty
Ho Yu-wang	17	Terrorism	Pleaded guilty Jailed for 72 months
Chan Hoi-leung	18	Terrorism	Bailed
Cheung Ho-yeung	23	Conspiracy to cause explosions	Pleaded guilty Jailed for 72 months

Members of Returning Valiant were initially arrested and charged with conspiracy to incite subversion or conspiracy to plan terrorist activities, with one defendant facing both charges. All defendants remanded in custody as bail application denied by court or did not submit so, except a 16-year-old boy who was granted bail before sentencing, and 24-year-old Chan Hoi-leung.

=== Subversion ===
All seven defendants pleaded guilty to inciting subversion, including four minors aged under 18. The prosecutor, Stella Lo, argued that leaflets written by the defendants had mentioned the Ukrainian Revolution, French Revolution, and words from Mao Zedong on revolution. They were accused of calling for the overthrow of the government and violent struggle against authorities through live videos and online press conferences.

On 8 October 2022, five young defendants, including four minors, were sentenced to up to three years at the training centre by Kwok Wai-kin, national security judge. Kwok said that "Even if one person is incited, Hong Kong's stability and residents' safety could have been greatly harmed", and claimed that their message could have turned peaceful protestors violent, even though he agreed there was no direct evidence of anyone doing that.

The United Nations Human Rights Office said it was "alarmed" by the sentencing of minors to correctional facility. The Office regretted the "continued application of the national security law, including against children, in spite of the clear recommendations of the Human Rights Committee", and urged the Hong Kong authorities too bring the legislation fully into compliance with international human rights obligations.

On 9 February 2023, Choi Wing-kit, founder of Returning Valiant who faced additional charge of possessing offensive weapons, and Chan Yau-tsun were sentenced to jail. While both had not been charged for actual subversion but only conspiracy, Kwok determined that the offences were of a "serious" nature and sentenced Chan to five years, the minimum mandated under the NSL, while Choi was sentenced to five years and three months, with the increment due to two retractable batons that had been found at his home. Both had pleaded guilty.

=== Terrorism ===
On 16 December 2022, a bail application of Law Kai-wing was rejected. Cheung Ho-yeung, 23, was charged with terrorism along with the other defendants of Returning Valiant on 20 April 2023 after his first arrest in October 2022.

On 6 May 2023, Ho Yu-wang pleaded guilty to conspiracy to plan terrorist activities under the NSL, while the other five pleaded guilty to the non-NSL alternative charge of conspiracy to cause explosion likely to endanger life or property. According to court, Ho, described by the prosecution as "mastermind" along with another man surnamed Cheung who was not arrested, planned to plant a bomb in a court building by 15 July 2022, days after their arrests, and encouraged others to join him. A former member of Student Politicism surnamed Cheung, who was not arrested, was revealed to be another "mastermind" of the attack for providing financial support.

On 29 December 2023, Ho Yu-wang and Cheung Ho-yeung were sentenced to six years in jail, while former Returning Valiant member Kwok Man-hei was sentenced to 30 months. The latter two had pleaded guilty to the lesser charge of "conspiracy to cause explosions".
