= Patrick Lam (journalist) =

Hong Kong journalist

Patrick Lam (Chinese: 林紹桐) is a Hong Kong journalist. Lam was formerly an editor at the now defunct pro-democracy Stand News. He previously covered the crackdown on the city's civil liberties.

== Sedition case ==
In August 2024, Lam and fellow former Stand News editor Chung Pui-kuen were under a colonial-era sedition law of "conspiracy to publish and reproduce seditious publications" by Hong Kong District Court Judge Kwok Wai-Kin. The trial was the first against members of the media since the 1997 Hong Kong handover. In September 2024, Lam was sentenced to 10 months in prison.

Former governor of Hong Kong Chris Patten described the convictions as "a dark day for press freedom" in Hong Kong. The arrests were criticized by Amnesty International's China Director Sarah Brooks, who described them as ‘jailed for doing their job’.
