= E-zone =

Hong Kong magazine

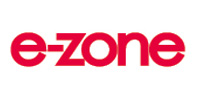
- Type: Magazine
- Owner: Hong Kong Economic Times Holdings
- Publisher: Hong Kong Economic Times Holdings
- Founded: 1998; 28 years ago
- Headquarters: Kodak House II, 321 Java Road, North Point, Hong Kong
- Website: e-zone

e-zone is a Hong Kong IT magazine which is published every Thursday.

The last print issue of e-zone was published on 20 December 2021. It then operate in all-digital media format, including the website (ezone.hk), the digital section of the U Lifestyle App and social media pages.

== Background ==
=== History ===
e-zone was established by HKET Group (Hong Kong Economic Times Holdings Limited) in 1998.

- 1998: The PC and digital weekly magazine, e-zone, was published and tied-in with HKET.
- 2003: e-zone was spun off from HKET for total retail sale.
- 2006: e-zone@school is published with the e-zone for school, targeting both primary and secondary school students who are studying ICT.

=== Profile ===
The magazine was divided into three books and constructed by four sections, which included:

- PC + Tablet: Features application of PC hardware and software.
- Phone: Compares different brands of tablets and smartphones.
- DIGI + DIY: Highlights digital products and analysis on corporate IT strategies.

== Details ==
e-zone Phone

- Gear Phone︰Introduces the latest information about the cell phones in market.
- Gear Price War︰Compares different mobiles and service plans.
- App Snapshot︰Compares the latest mobile apps on photo taking.
- App Game︰Introduces the latest mobile apps.
- Price Checker︰Compares different prices of the mobile phone.

e-zone PC

- Cover story︰Analyzes the latest information communication technologies and products.
- Webzine︰Introduces the online games and the relevant game tips.
- 2nd-hand market : Collects and shows all the 2nd-hand computer market information.

e-zone Digi

- Special Report︰Introduces the latest digital products in market.
- Know How︰Analyzes the functions and details of the digital products.
- Have Fun︰Introduces the newest games.

e-zone DIY

- DIY Walker︰Teaches the techniques on making your own personal computer.
- Pro Report︰Tests and analyses several computer hardware and software.
- Price Fight︰Introduces the most popular products (computer hardware) in the markets and rank them with details.

It ranked Number One among computer magazine in Hong Kong in terms of readership. And its main competitor is PCM (Magazine) which published by Sing Tao Daily.

The magazine offers annual e-brand awards.
