= Gwyneth Ho =

Hong Kong journalist

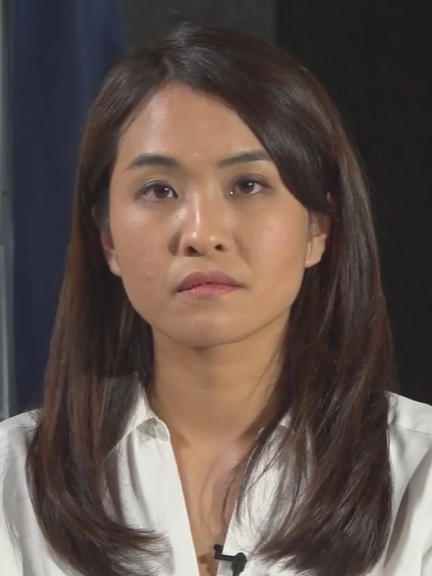
- Ho in the 2020 pro-democracy primaries

Personal details
- Born: 24 August 1990 (age 36)
- Party: Independent
- Occupation: Former journalist

Chinese name
- Traditional Chinese: 何桂藍
- Simplified Chinese: 何桂蓝
Transcriptions
Standard Mandarin
- Hanyu Pinyin: Hé Guìlán
Yue: Cantonese
- Jyutping: ho4 gwai3 laam4

Gwyneth Ho Kwai-lam (Chinese: 何桂藍; born 24 August 1990) is a Hong Kong activist and former reporter of the now defunct news outlet Stand News, who rose to prominence for her frontline reporting in the 2019–2020 Hong Kong protests. In June 2020, she announced her candidature in the 2020 Hong Kong pro-democracy primaries, in which she obtained a nomination ticket in the general election that was later postponed. For her participation, she was arrested in January 2021 along with over 50 other pro-democrats on national security charges and was remanded in custody. In December 2021, she received a sentence of six months in relation to her role in a banned protest during the 31st anniversary of the 1989 Tiananmen Square protests and massacre in June 2020. She was then sentenced to seven years in November 2024 for subversion against the government and remains in prison.

== Education ==
Ho was educated at Ho Fung College and Tsinghua University. Ho studied at the University of Amsterdam, where she obtained a master's degree in Journalism through the Erasmus Mundus programme.

== Journalism career ==
The moment when Ho was attacked by Chan (陳志祥) in Yuen Long. Chan has yet to be arrested by the police.

Ho joined Radio Television Hong Kong (RTHK) as an intern reporter in 2011. She later worked for various media outlets, including BBC Chinese and The Reporter. She was also employed as a reporter for House News, the predecessor of Stand News.

Ho gained recognition as a frontline reporter for Stand News in the 2019–2020 Hong Kong protests, acquiring the nickname "Sister Stand News" (立場姐姐). On 1 July 2019, Ho was one of the reporters present inside the Legislative Council Complex, where she reported on the storming of the Legislative Council. She interviewed a young pro-democracy activist who expressed solidarity with other Hong Kong protesters, which garnered Ho a lot of attention for her reporting.

On 21 July, Ho reported on the 2019 Yuen Long attack, where swarms of suspected triad gangsters assaulted pro-democracy protesters at the Yuen Long MTR station. She had been live streaming the attack, which showed one of the violent assailants striking protesters over the barrier of a train's passenger gantry. The assailant suddenly ran towards Ho and started hitting her. Ho continued filming even after she was struck and knocked to the ground, capturing footage of paramedics attending to the injured. She was hospitalized after the attack, suffering from minor head, hand, and shoulder injuries. Ho's video footage went viral internationally, shocking the audience about the horrors of the night.

== Legislative Council bid, arrest, and sentencing for 2020 vigil ==
On 18 June 2020, Ho announced her intention to run in the (subsequently postponed) 2020 Hong Kong legislative election after quitting her journalism career. Her decision to quit journalism was partly motivated by the Yuen Long incident from 21 July 2019 in which she had been injured. In July 2020, Ho participated in the pro-democracy primaries within the New Territories East constituency. With 26,802 votes, Ho had the highest number of votes among the candidates, securing a nomination ticket in the general election. On 30 July 2020, it was announced that Ho had been disqualified, along with several other pro-democracy candidates, from running.

On 6 January 2021, Ho was among 53 members of the pro-democratic camp who were arrested under the national security law, specifically its provision regarding alleged subversion. The group stood accused of the organisation of and participation in the primary elections held by the camp in July 2020. Ho was released on bail on 7 January, but was charged under the national security law in late February with bail denied by court since then. Friends of Ho have posted on her social media pages several long letters from jail in which she interweaves her political stance, pop culture and the future of the pro-democracy movement.

On 9 December 2021, a Hong Kong court found Ho guilty of inciting and taking part in an unlawful assembly on occasion of the 31st anniversary of the 1989 Tiananmen Square protests and massacre on 4 June 2020. More than a dozen politicians and activists had been charged over the assembly. Along with Chow Hang-tung and Jimmy Lai, Ho had contested her charges. During the trial, Ho said while she had been in Victoria Park on the evening of the candlelight vigil, she had not been taking part in it, but instead intending to show resistance to the regime; and that her holding flowers and a candle was to test the difference between Hong Kong and mainland China. District Court Judge Amanda Woodcock dismissed the arguments by Ho as "frankly non-sensical", as with the arguments of Chow and Lai. On 13 December, Ho was sentenced to six months in prison on the charges.

On 30 May 2024, Ho was found guilty of subversion in the primary elections case, along with 13 other defendants. She received a sentence of seven years in November 2024.
