= Kwok Wai-kin =

Hong Kong judge

Kwok Wai-kin (Chinese: 郭偉健; born 1959) is a Hong Kong judge. He has sparked controversies over his political remarks on his hearings.

== Biography ==
Kwok was born in Hong Kong in 1959 and obtained Bachelor of Laws (LL.B) and Postgraduate Certificate in Laws (P.C.LL.) from the University of Hong Kong in 1981 and 1982 respectively. He was called to the Bar in Hong Kong in 1982 and was in private practice from 1983 until 1992 when he joined the judiciary as Permanent Magistrate in 1992. He was appointed as Principal Magistrate in 1999 and District Judge in 2012.

Kwok lost his identity card in 2004 and applied for the reissue, but requested the HK$395 replacement payment be waived because he was going to replace the smart identity card according to the government programme. His request was however rejected by the Immigration Department. Controversies floated as the Justice and Immigration Departments did not prosecute Kwok for the matter. Chief Justice Andrew Li defended Kwok, saying that he did not abuse his status as magistrate.

Kwok has heard a number of prominent protest-related cases including one involving nine defendants charged with rioting during the 2016 Mong Kok civil unrest in which he jailed 19-year-old Mo Jia-tao for more than four years – the heaviest of 10 sentences. Kwok rejected suggestions of political motivation raised during mitigation, such as the labelling of "a political demonstration" or the defendants' alignment with localist ideas due to their frustration following the collapse of the 2014 Occupy protests. "Without doubt, the court will not join this political debate," Kwok repeatedly stressed. He also stressed the "collective responsibility" as each individual's mere presence "provided comfort, support and encouragement" to others at the scene.

In an April 2020 hearing, Kwok expressed sympathy for tour guide Tony Hung for stabbing three people, in which one of them was critically wounded, in front of a pro-democracy Lennon Wall in a pedestrian tunnel in Tseung Kwan O during the anti-extradition protests in August 2019. Kwok said the defendant was himself "an involuntary sacrifice and a bloodstained victim hanging by his last breath" as the protesters had "ruthlessly trampled on his right to work, live and survive". Kwok also slammed protesters for acting "like an army", through beating people up and blocking roads; he said that protesters hurting ordinary people while pursuing their cause were no different from terrorists, and compared their extremist conduct to the excesses of the Cultural Revolution. Kwok praised Hung for "showing noble qualities" (“情操高尚”) when he wrote to the court expressing his regrets. Kwok sentenced Hung to 45 months in prison for the three counts of wounding with intent, an offence punishable by imprisonment for up to seven years (the starting point in the case had been six years). Prominent lawyers and pro-democracy activists raised concerns over Kwok's political remarks, questioning the light sentence as being biased. Joshua Wong said he would consider filing a complaint with the judiciary.

Shortly after Kwok's remarks, judiciary made a last-minute switch before the proceedings on a protest-related case, replacing Kwok with Ko King-sau as the presiding judge, and would no longer handle all relating cases. On 25 May, Chief Justice Geoffrey Ma issued a statement, saying that a judge expressing unnecessary political views may impair public confidence in the judiciary. Ma has decided that Kwok should not hear any cases involving a similar political context for the time being.

On 30 July 2021, the judiciary announced that the ban on Kwok presiding over protest-related cases had been lifted. The decision by Chief District Judge Justin Ko had been made in view of Kwok's "expertise and experience" and his work performance over the past year. The statement also referred to the workload of the District Court as a factor in the decision, citing its load of over 300 protest-related cases, the majority of which were still pending.

In September 2022, Kwok convicted 5 people over conspiracy to publish and distribute seditious publications, over their creation of children's books which hinted at the 2019 protests.

On 8 October 2022, Kwok sentenced 4 minors as part of the "Returning Valiant" group, and claimed that their message could have turned peaceful protestors violent, even though he agreed there was no direct evidence of anyone doing that. Kwok said that "Even if one person is incited, Hong Kong's stability and residents' safety could have been greatly harmed."

On 22 October 2022, Kwok sentenced 3 activists from the Student Politicism group, and said that booths they had set up were "popular" and were a "deliberate challenge" to the national security law.

On 1 November 2022, Kwok said that a time limit which states that charges must be laid within 6 months of an offense would be non-applicable in a case against 2 top editors of Stand News.

In May 2023, the Congressional-Executive Commission on China (CECC) of the United States Congress suggested the United States government imposing sanctions on Fok to counter the erosion of democratic freedoms in Hong Kong over his handling of a national security law case.

In August 2024, Kwok convicted two Hong Kong journalists, Chung Pui-Kuen and Patrick Lam, of conspiring to publish seditious materials, via the now defunct Stand News online publication. In his ruling, he argued that freedom of speech concerns needed to be balanced "with prevention of the potential damage wrought by incendiary publications."
