= City on Fire (Dapiran book) =

Nonfiction book

- Author: Antony Dapiran
- Subject: 2019–2020 Hong Kong protests
- Publisher: Scribe Publications
- Publication date: March 2020

City on Fire: The Fight for Hong Kong is a nonfiction book by Antony Dapiran. It discusses the 2019–2020 Hong Kong protests, which the author described as "a battle for Hong Kong's very soul".

== Background ==
Dapiran, from Australia, lived in Hong Kong for an extended length of time and provided consulting to Chinese companies over a 20-year period.

Dapiran was present at several of the 2019 protests.

== Contents ==
The first chapter discusses tear gas.

The book also discusses the evolution of protest in Hong Kong; the catalyst for the protests, the murder of Poon Hiu-wing; the 2019 Hong Kong local elections; and the siege of the Hong Kong Polytechnic University.

The book includes a prediction that the Chinese government would increase its direct control on Hong Kong, something Dapiran describes as "a slow and steady squeeze". The book also describes how Hong Kongers perceive an erosion of their own sense of self, and how there was, on the British side during the Handover of Hong Kong in 1997, what was described as "wishful thinking" by Nicholas Gattig, in the Japan Times. The book's content ends whilst the conflict was still ongoing.

Gattig stated that Dapiran's support for the protest movement and the author's "love of the city [pervade] the book".

== Release ==
Published by Scribe, the book was released in March 2020.

== Reception ==
Gattig praised the "smooth, heady prose". He stated that the book "never feels rushed or less than coherent" despite how quickly it was written and published after the protests. Will Higginbotham of the Australian Book Review praised the "journalistic prowess" and how the author "excels at contemplating both the small and big events". Joshua Wallace of Tarleton State University stated that the book is a "fascinating read". Graduate student Joe Bauer, of the Johns Hopkins School of Advanced International Studies, praised the author's "ability to bring the narrative to life".
