= Ronson Chan =

Hong Kong journalist

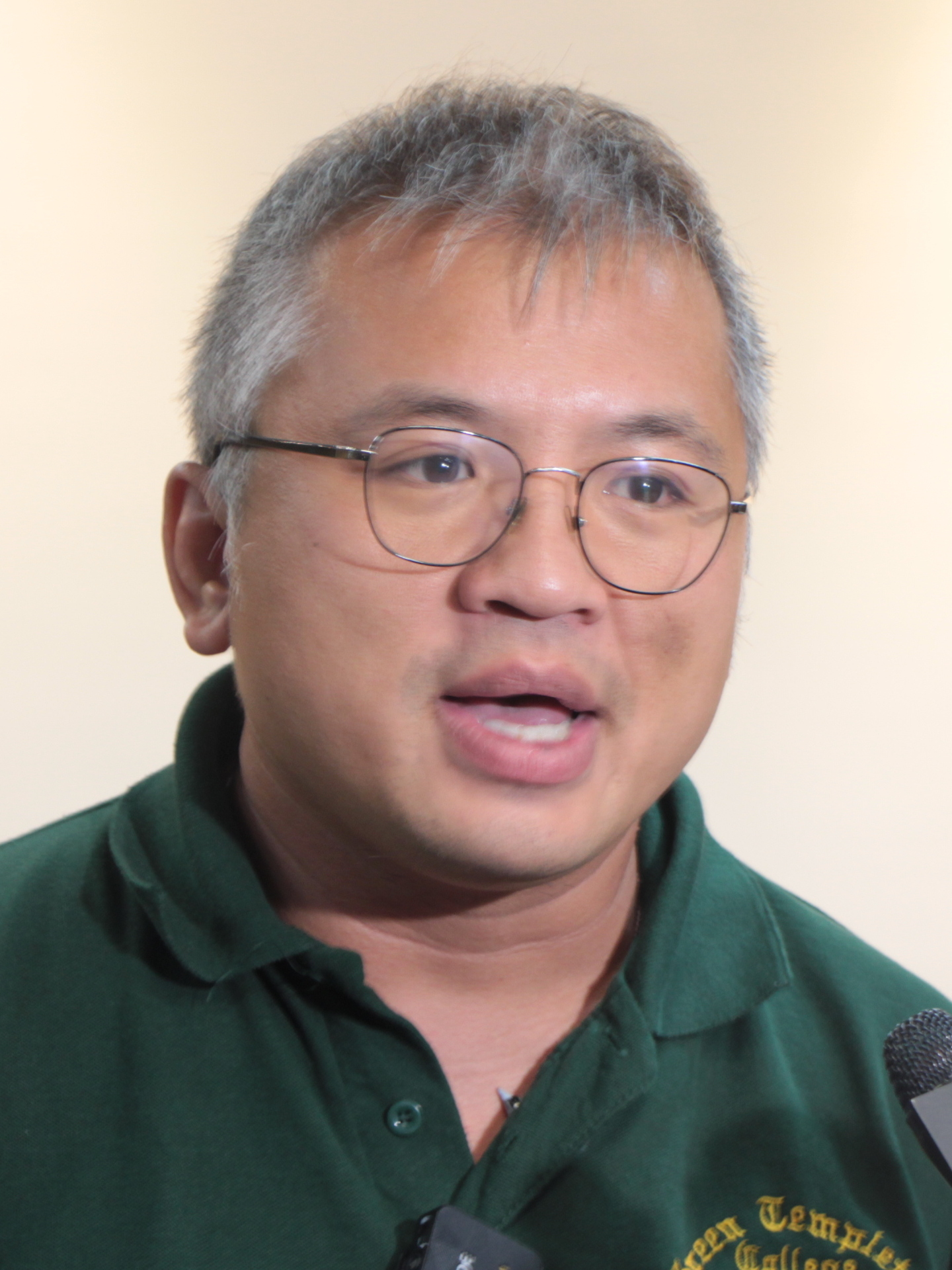
Chan in 2023

Ronson Chan Ron-sing (Chinese: 陳朗昇; born 2 May 1981) is a Hong Kong journalist and a former chairman of the Hong Kong Journalists Association. Previously working for Apple Daily and Stand News, he became a delivery driver after both these outlets were closed due to the enactment of the Hong Kong national security law. His home was also raided shortly before Stand News closed down. In September 2022, Chan was charged with obstructing police, days before he was set to take up a fellowship at the Reuters Institute at Oxford University. The arrest was widely felt to be part of an attack on Hong Kong's freedom of the press.

Chan was released on bail on 23 September after pleading not guilty to obstructing police officers, and was allowed to travel to the UK to take up his fellowship at Oxford.
