= Hong Kong Economic Times =

Daily financial newspaper in Hong Kong

Hong Kong Economic Times 香港經濟日報
- Type: Daily
- Format: Broadsheet
- Owner: Hong Kong Economic Times Holdings
- Founded: 26 January 1988
- Political alignment: Pro-Beijing
- Language: Traditional Chinese
- Headquarters: 6/F, Kodak House II, 321 Java Road, North Point Hong Kong
- Website: www.hket.com

Hong Kong Economic Times
- Traditional Chinese: 香港經濟日報
- Simplified Chinese: 香港经济日报
Transcriptions
Standard Mandarin
- Hanyu Pinyin: Xiānggǎng jīngjì rìbào
Yue: Cantonese
- Yale Romanization: Hēung góng gīng jai yaht bou
- Jyutping: Hoeng^{1}gong^{2} Ging^{1}zai^{3} Yat^{6}bou^{3}

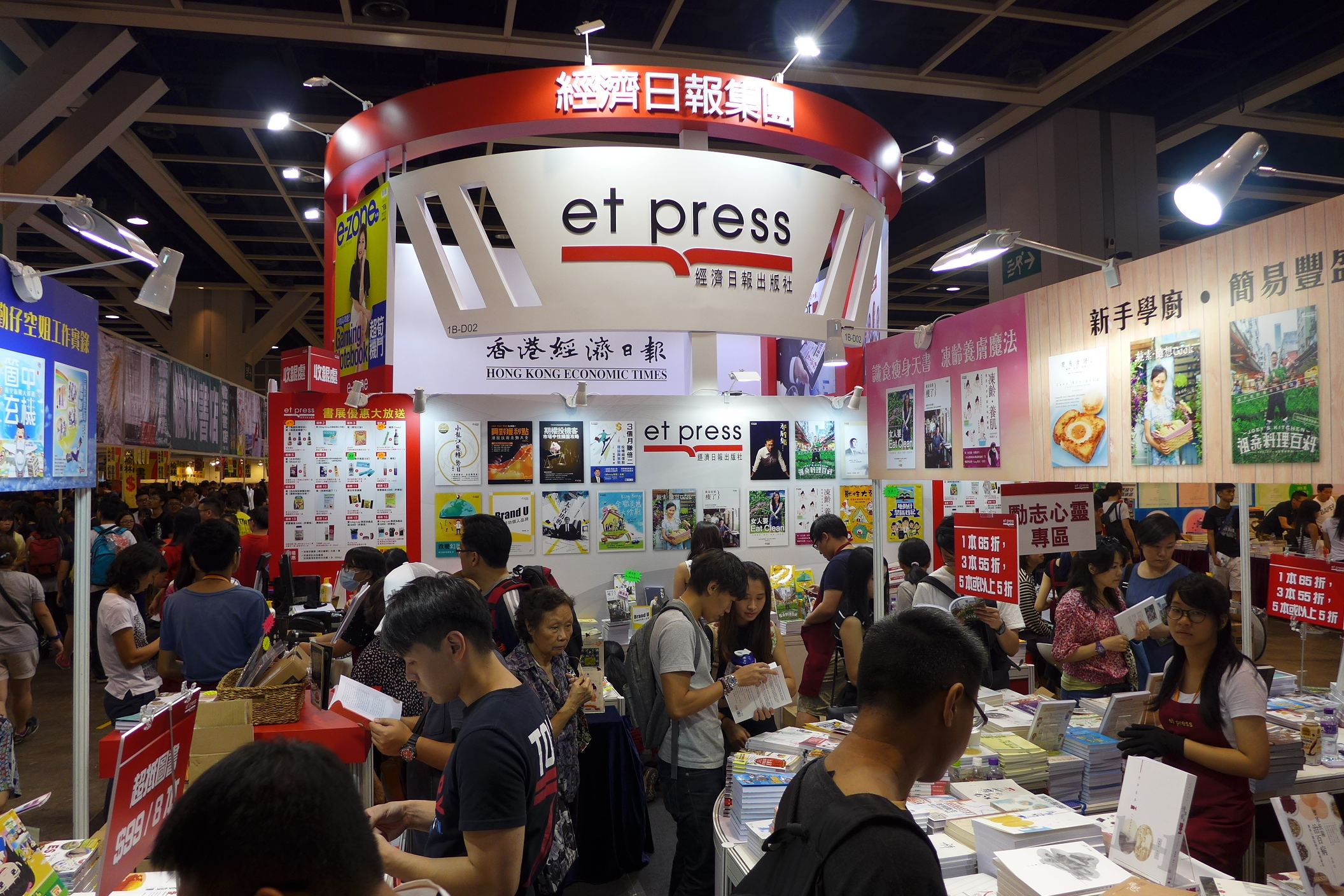
The Hong Kong Economic Times at HK Book Fair 2016.

The Hong Kong Economic Times (abbreviated as the HKET) is a financial daily newspaper in Hong Kong. It was founded by Lawrence S P Fung (Chinese: 馮紹波; chairman), Perry Mak (managing director), Arthur Shek Kang-chuen (石鏡泉; executive director) and others. It started with a HK$20 million investment in 1988.

The newspaper is published by Hong Kong Economic Times Holdings Limited. It has been listed on the main board of the Stock Exchange of Hong Kong since 3 August 2005.

== Controversies ==
=== Founder's suspected involvement in Yuen Long station riot ===
On 20 July 2019, at the pro-Beijing "Safeguard HK" event, HKET founder Arthur Chuen publicly called pro-Beijing supporters to purchase canes and PVC pipes to punish those who opposed the 2019 Hong Kong extradition bill. The very next day, a mob with suspected ties to triads used canes and metal pipes launched an indiscriminate attack which injured 45 people at Yuen Long station. The public suspected that Chuen's comments might have incited the pro-Beijing camp to launch this riot. On 22 July 2019, over 100 HKET reporters published a joint statement expressing shock and deep regret towards Chuen's comments and requested him to withdraw his statement. HKET announced that Chuen's comments were his personal opinion and did not represent the newspaper's position. In the evening of the same day, Chuen apologized and withdrew his comment. The next day, Chuen announced to the HKET board of directors that he resigned as executive director and deputy president of the newspaper effective immediately, but that he would continue to serve as a financial columnist.

=== Plagiarism allegations ===
HKET subsidiaries Sky Post and TOPick reporters were alleged to have plagiarized stories reported by other online media without permission. This included copying text word-for-word into HKET website and reproducing YouTube video contents in the form of text and screenshots in detail without attributing original sources.

== See also ==
- Newspapers of Hong Kong
- Media in Hong Kong
