= Hong Kong Economic Times Holdings =

Hong Kong newspaper and book publisher

- Trade name: HHET Holdings
- Native name: 香港經濟日報集團有限公司
- Type: Public
- Traded as: SEHK: 423
- Industry: Publishing
- Genre: Financial
- Headquarters: Hong Kong
- Area served: Hong Kong
- Products: newspaper; magazine
- Website: www.hketgroup.com

Hong Kong Economic Times Holdings
- Traditional Chinese: 香港經濟日報集團有限公司
- Simplified Chinese: 香港经济日报集团有限公司
Transcriptions
Standard Mandarin
- Hanyu Pinyin: Xiānggǎng Jīngjì Rìbào Jítuán Yǒuxiàngōngsī
Yue: Cantonese
- Jyutping: hoeng1 gong2 ging1 zai3 jat6 bou3 zaap6 tyun4 jau5 haan6 gung1 si1

Hong Kong Economic Times Holdings Limited also known as HKET Group, is a Hong Kong publisher. Its main product was Hong Kong Economic Times and its website hket.com. The company owns media such as Hong Kong Economic Times, hket.com, U Lifestyle, CTgoodjobs, Health Smart and Apex Print, etc.

== Publications ==
Apart from HKET, other publications under the printed media segment of the group include:

- Sky Post, a free newspaper (Mondays to Fridays)

Launched on 27 July 2011.

- e-zone, a mass market IT magazine (Mondays) (For retail sale)

A mass market IT weekly magazine that focuses on trends in information and communications technology. It features application of PC hardware and software, tablet and smartphones how-to, digital AV products highlights and analysis on corporate IT strategies. e-zone was spun off from HKET for total retail sale in late 2003.

- U Magazine (Chinese: U周刊; lit. 'U Weekly') – A weekly travel magazine.
- iMoney, a financial retail weekly (Saturdays) (For retail sale)

iMoney was a financial weekly launched on 27 October 2007. Its contents focus on wealth management, together with innovative business, marketing gimmicks, workplaces, self-enhancement, etc., covering HK and the Mainland China markets.

== Book publishing ==
- ET Press is providing its readers with contents about investment, business and management. In addition, riding on the success of ET Press, WHY Publishing aims at targeting young readers.

== Other business segments of HKET Holdings ==
Apart from Printed Media business segment, HKET Holdings has diversified its business into Financial News Agency, Information and Solutions; Recruitment Advertising and Training; and Lifestyle Portals.
