= Leung Man-tao =

Hong Kong writer

- 梁文道
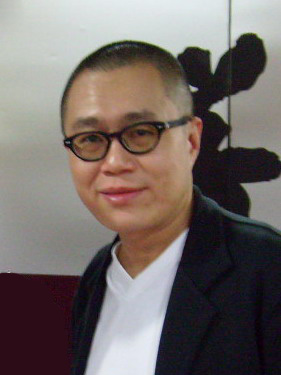
- Leung in 2009 in Guangzhou
- Born: December 26, 1970 (age 55); Hong Kong
- Education: Chinese University of Hong Kong
- Occupations: Writer, critic, host
- Writing career
- Language: Chinese, English
- Period: 1988–present
- Genre: Prose
- Notable works: Common Sense; Too Much Noise

Leung Man-tao (Chinese: 梁文道; pinyin: Liáng Wéndào;, born 26 December 1970) is a Hong Kong writer, cultural commentator, columnist, critic and TV host.

== Life and career ==
=== Life and education ===
Leung was born in a Catholic family in Hong Kong on December 26, 1970, with his ancestral home in Shunde, Guangdong. Leung was raised primarily in Taiwan, returning to Hong Kong only during high school.Leung graduated from Chinese University of Hong Kong, where he majored in philosophy at the Chung Chi College.

In 2008, Leung converted to Theravada Buddhism.

=== Media career ===
Leung started his media career in Hong Kong in the late 1990s, as a TV program host, guest speaker, and a columnist for newspaper and magazines.

In 1998, Leung hosted Teacup in a Storm in Metro Broadcast Corporation.

In 1999, Leung joined the Phoenix Television and became a frequent guest speaker on talk show Behind the Headlines with Wentao (锵锵三人行) hosted by Dou Wentao until its abrupt cancellation in 2017.

Leung’s media career was rooted in his passion for books and reading. In 2007, Leung launched book review program on Phoenix Television, Opening the Book for Eight Minutes (开卷八分钟). The show featured introductions to both Chinese and Western classics alongside contemporary works, all condensed into an eight-minute segment. By the time it concluded in 2014, the program had enjoyed an eight-year run spanning 1,922 episodes. Launched in 2015 through video platform Vistopia, Leung’s internet series 1,001 Nights continued his efforts to promote literature. By recording his segments amidst Beijing's nocturnal cityscape, he illustrated his belief that literature connects us to reality instead of distancing us from it.

In April 2024, Leung launched the paid podcast Eight and a Half (八分半), a program dedicated to arts, culture, society, and current affairs. Available on platforms such as Ximalaya and Xiaoyuzhou, the show attracted tens of thousands of subscribers, with an estimated annual revenue of RMB 15 million.

By August 2025, however, the program was scrubbed from all major mainland Chinese audio platforms. Concurrently, Leung’s social media accounts on Xiaohongshu, Bilibili, and WeChat Video Channel were either banned or "sealed." The crackdown followed a July episode commemorating the late Hong Kong writer Chua Lam; in it, Leung referenced the closure of pro-democracy outlets like Apple Daily and expressed gratitude toward its founder, Jimmy Lai. The episode’s description of Hong Kong’s current social and economic climate as "unprecedentedly desolate" led to widespread speculation that these sensitive topics triggered the censorship. In response, netizens expressed frustration over the growing intolerance for moderate, nuanced perspectives, lamenting the shrinking space for independent commentary in China.

== Works ==
- Wo Zhi (in Chinese). Guangxi: Guangxi Normal University. 2009. ISBN 9787563383870.
- Reader (in Chinese). Beijing: Law Publishing House. 2009. ISBN 9787503698965.
- Too Much Noise (in Chinese). Guangzhou: Huacheng Publishing House. 2009. ISBN 9787536056008.
- Common Sense (in Chinese). Guangxi: Guangxi Normal University. 2009. ISBN 9787563379637.
