= Antony Dapiran =

Australian lawyer and writer

Antony Dapiran is a prominent Australian lawyer and writer, who has become widely known for his books, newspaper writings and commentary in Western media on protest movements in Hong Kong.

== Early life ==
Dapiran received a double degree (BA/LLB) in Chinese and Law from the University of Melbourne in 1998. As an undergraduate student, he also spent time at Peking University, where he acquired certificates in economic law and Chinese.

== Legal career ==
After graduating from the University of Melbourne, Dapiran moved to Hong Kong in 1999 and joined the law firm Freshfields Bruckhaus Deringer, where he eventually made partner and was put in charge of the firm's Beijing office. In 2010, he joined the law firm Davis Polk & Wardwell and established its Hong Kong office. In 2017, Dapiran joined Skadden Arps Slate Meagher & Flom's Hong Kong office as Of Counsel, but left the firm in 2019 to focus on his writing on the 2019-2020 Hong Kong Protests.

During his legal career, Dapiran has specialised in corporate law, in particular the initial public offerings of Chinese state owned enterprises. He has been involved in IPOs that have raised almost US$80 billion in total. Dapiran rose to prominence for "representing large Chinese state-owned enterprises such as the Agricultural Bank of China, Industrial and Commercial Bank of China, the People s Insurance Company of China and China International Capital Corp. on overseas listings and cross-border transactions." According to the Sydney Morning Herald, Dapiran "is probably the only foreign lawyer to have advised on three out of four of China’s megabank IPOs." Most notably, Dapiran worked on the US$22.1 billion IPO of the Agricultural Bank of China in 2010, which was the biggest in history at the time.

== Writer and commentator ==
In 2017, Dapiran published his first book City of Protest: A Recent History of Dissent in Hong Kong with Penguin Books, which dealt with the history of protest movements in Hong Kong since the 1960s. In the book, Dapiran particularly focuses on the 2014 Hong Kong Protests. According to Dapiran, witnessing these protests made him "realise my identity as a Hongkonger." Since the publication of Dapiran's first book, he has become one of the leading Western commentators on Hong Kong protest movements, in particular during the 2019-2020 Hong Kong Protests. He has been praised in the South China Morning Post as being "renowned as a clear-eyed observer of the city’s politics" and is often quoted as an expert on Hong Kong by media such as Quartz, the Financial Times or Time. Writing in publications such as The Guardian, The Atlantic, New Statesman, CNN and Foreign Policy and appearing on programs like the BBC, Bloomberg TV, Reuters, RTHK and ABC, Dapiran has been highly critical of the Hong Kong government and the Chinese central government in Beijing, asserting, for example, that "the Hong Kong government is no longer acting in the best interests of its people," that "Beijing has taken advantage of global distraction [due to the outbreak of Covid-19] to begin taking retribution for Hong Kong’s open defiance of China’s rule" in 2019, and that the Chinese government uses the law to act against the opposition in Hong Kong. In July 2020, he claimed that the Chinese government is acting like a "colonial power" in Hong Kong and that "the U.S. measures, alongside Beijing’s own crackdown on Hong Kong, are fast turning the city from an open, stable international financial center to contested ground at the very front lines of a rapidly intensifying geopolitical conflict." Since 2020, he also writes a regular column for the Hong Kong Outlet Citizen News.

In 2020, Dapiran published his second book, City on Fire: The Fight for Hong Kong. The book chronicles the Hong Kong protests of 2019, often retelling Dapiran's first hand experience of visiting protest sites such as the Hong Kong Polytechnic University. While the book received some positive reviews, other reviewers critically noted that the book was obviously written in support of the protest movement, thus lacking in balance. In October 2020 City on Fire was longlisted for the Walkley Book Award.

== Publications ==
- City of Protest: A Recent History of Dissent in Hong Kong. Penguin Press, 2017.
- City on Fire: The Fight for Hong Kong. Scribe, 2020.
