= Stand News =

Hong Kong non-profit online news website

- Type: Online-only news
- Owner: Best Pencil (Hong Kong) Ltd.
- Founder(s): Chung Pui-kuen; Yu Ka-fai; Tony Tsoi Tung-ho
- Editor-in-chief: Patrick Lam (final)
- Predecessor: House News
- Founded: 30 December 2014
- Ceased publication: 29 December 2021
- Political alignment: Pro-democracy
- Language: Traditional Chinese
- Website: thestandnews.com

Stand News
- Traditional Chinese: 立場新聞
- Simplified Chinese: 立场新闻
Transcriptions
Standard Mandarin
- Hanyu Pinyin: Lìchǎng Xīnwén
Yue: Cantonese
- Jyutping: laap6 coeng4 san1 man4*2

Stand News (Chinese: 立場新聞) was a free non-profit online news website based in Hong Kong from 2014 to 2021. Founded in December 2014, it was the successor of House News. It primarily focused on social and political issues in Hong Kong, and generally took a pro-democracy editorial position.

Stand News was ranked highest in credibility among online news media in Hong Kong in two public opinion surveys conducted by the Chinese University of Hong Kong in 2016 and 2019.

On 29 December 2021, amid the backdrop of increasing government suppression of news media following the 2020 enactment of the Hong Kong national security law, Stand News was raided by the Hong Kong Police Force, who arrested senior staff and froze the company's assets. As a result, similar to Apple Daily earlier the same year, Stand News was forced to dismiss its staff and cease operations.

== Background ==
Stand News was founded after the closure of House News in July 2014. Instead of running the website as a limited company like House News, the owner company of the website, Best Pencil (Hong Kong) Limited, is legally managed by a trust company, while prohibiting any transfer of shares.

Following the forced closure of Apple Daily on 24 June 2021, the organisation announced precautionary measures, citing "security concerns". While it vowed to continue publishing, it said that it would pre-emptively take off line all non-news items, such as commentaries and op-eds. Stating that giving their current finances would allow operations to continue for 9 to 12 months, they would cease to accept sponsorships or subscriptions to prevent money "going to waste". Six of the board's eight members resigned."

The organisation also participated in the Pandora Papers leaks in October 2021.

== Incidents ==
The moment that Gwyneth Ho, a female journalist of Stand News, was attacked in Yuen Long.

=== Legal dispute with former Chief Executive Leung Chun-ying ===
On 24 August 2018, former Chief Executive Leung Chun-ying filed for defamation against university professor Chung Kim-wah and Stand News in the High Court, alleging that an article in the website falsely associated Leung with the triads. The article had reported a dinner between Leung's aides and alleged triad members. Chung Kim-wah refused to retract the article, while Stand News chief editor Chung Pui-kuen stated that he did not believe that the article defamed Leung, and extended Leung the right to reply.

=== Incidents during the 2019 Hong Kong protests ===
During the Yuen Long attack on 21 July 2019, Stand News reporter Gwyneth Ho was attacked by triad members while live-streaming the attack. When the assailants were attacking commuters in the train station, some of them turned on Ho, who was knocked over and hit by sticks and wooden batons while she continued filming. Ho was taken to the hospital, where she received treatment for her injuries and was given stitches.

On 20 December 2019, while he was reporting a shooting incident at Jade Plaza in Tai Po, a Stand News reporter's hands and mobile phone were clubbed repeatedly by a policeman; other reporters were pepper sprayed. The Hong Kong Journalists Association condemned the attack and intentional provocation by the Hong Kong Police. Senior journalist Yau Ching-Yuen alleged that the police might have known that the victim was working for the Stand News and thus intentionally targeted the reporter.

On 24 December 2019, a reporter of Stand News was attacked by the police using pepper spray. The reporter, armed with recording equipment, was covering a conflict between the police and civilians in Mong Kok at the time.

== Government suppression and closure ==
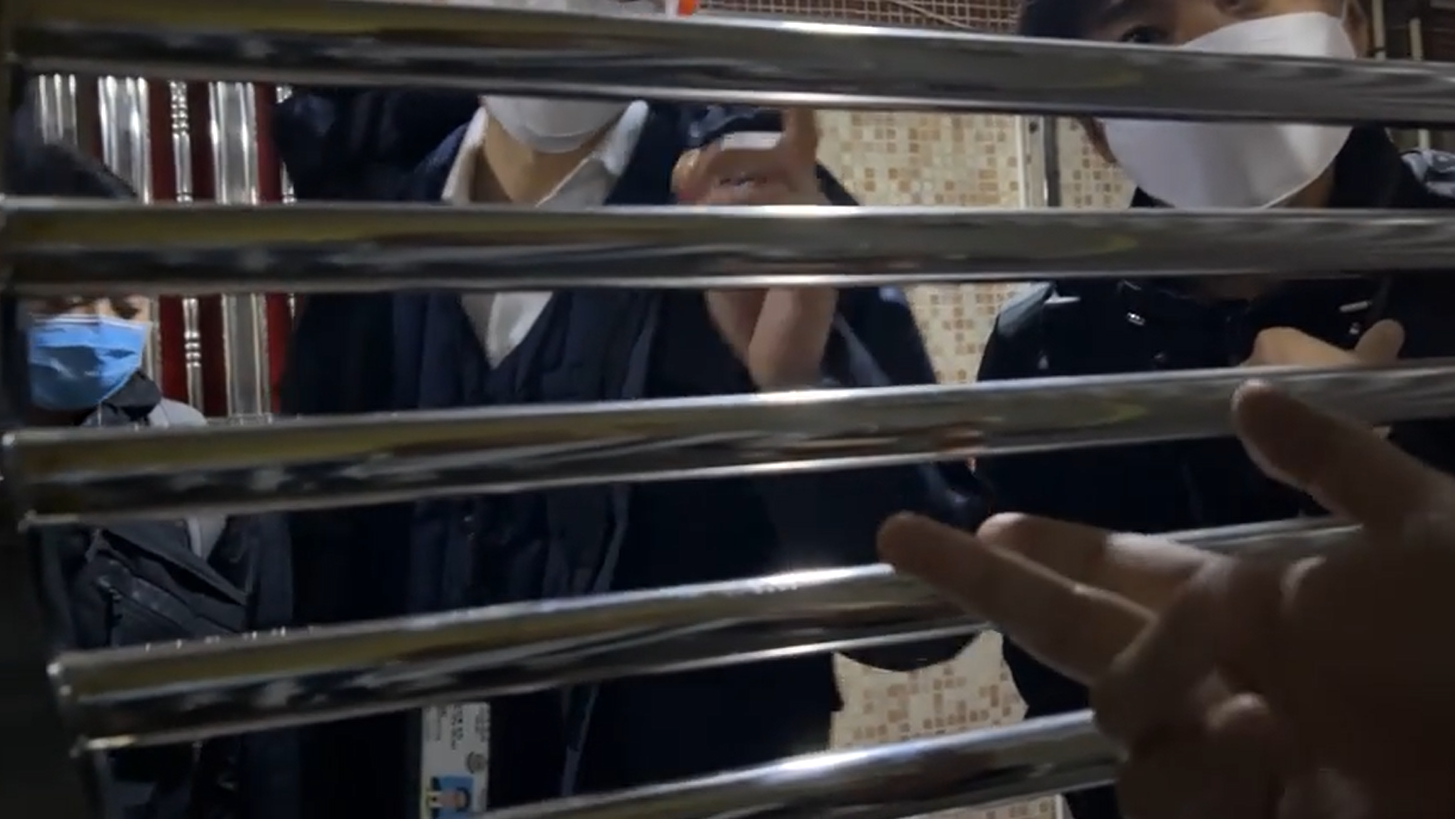
Ronson Chan live-streamed the police raid on his home on the Stand News Facebook page.

In 2021, a number of large, independent news publishers shut down in the wake of new national security laws. Stand News and Apple Daily in June and the prosecution of staff there. As a result, Stand News wrote that "speech crimes" had arrived in Hong Kong, and removed commentary pieces from its website. It also stopped accepting monthly donations from readers so as to avoid wasting donors' funds in the event that Stand News was suppressed in a similar manner as Apple Daily.

Stand News was targeted later that year. On 3 December 2021, Secretary for Security Chris Tang accused the outlet of bias, and of smearing Hong Kong's "smart prison" initiative. On the morning of 29 December, Stand News was raided by over 200 officers of the Hong Kong Police Force. Three men and three women were arrested and accused of conspiring to publish seditious material. Ronson Chan, a Stand News editor and chair of the Hong Kong Journalists Association, was also held for questioning by national security officers, and his home was raided; two former board members – former legislator Margaret Ng and pop icon Denise Ho were among those arrested.

Later the same day, Stand News announced on social media that it would cease publication and dismiss its employees as the company's assets were frozen by the police. Its website was promptly replaced by a short farewell letter. The company's Facebook and Twitter pages were deleted, and all content on its YouTube account was removed. The Stand News's UK bureau announced it would also shut down, with bureau chief Yeung Tin-shui resigning.

By the end of its life, their Facebook fans page had more than 1.7 million likes.

Former editor-in-chief Chung Pui-kuen and former editor-in-chief Patrick Lam were found guilty of sedition on 29 August 2024. The judgement said that, of the 17 Stand News articles considered by the court, 11 were found to be seditious. This was the first sedition conviction of journalists in Hong Kong since the 1997 handover.

== Editors-in-Chief ==
1. Chung Pui-kuen
2. Yu Ka-fai
3. Patrick Lam; interim

== Awards ==
- Breaking News Writing, Human Rights Press Awards (2020, winner)
- Explanatory Feature Writing, Human Rights Press Awards (2020, winner)
- Short Video, Human Rights Press Awards (2020, winner)
- Investigative Feature Writing, Human Rights Press Awards (2020, merit award)
- Press Freedom Prize, Reporters Without Borders (nominated, 2021)

== See also ==
- HK01, a Hong Kong Chinese online news website
- Hong Kong Free Press, a Hong Kong English nonprofit online news website
- Internet censorship in Hong Kong
