= House News =

Hong Kong news website

- Headquarters: Hong Kong
- Creators: Leung Man-tao, Tony Tsoi, Simon Lau, Greg Sung
- Website: TheHouseNews.com
- Launched: July 2012
- Current status: Closed 26 July 2014

House News (Chinese: 主場新聞) was a Hong Kong news website, content aggregator, and blog founded by Simon Lau, Tony Tsoi, Leung Man-tao and Greg Sung, which featured columnists and various news sources. The site offered news, blogs, and original content, and covered politics, business, lifestyle, culture, nature, technology, media, and local news. The successor of House News was Stand News (立場新聞).

== History ==
=== Launch ===
The site was launched on 6 July 2012, through Facebook, with the website going live on 28 July, in time for the successful protest against Hong Kong Moral and National Education the following day, which promoted Chinese political values and pro-Communist regime. On 28 August, the site launched an 'Election Dashboard' for the 2012 legislative elections.

=== Closure ===
On 26 July 2014, 17:06 (GMT +8), an announcement written by the founder Tony Tsoi was posted on Facebook, indicating an instant cessation of services of the website and the site now simply displays a closure announcement. The reasons given for closure were:

- Hong Kong has changed in such a way that being a normal citizen or a normal news medium or doing good for society is very scary and difficult to sustain.
- Tony Tsoi and his family is under political pressure and he is particularly fearful whenever crossing the border into China which is necessary in looking after his business interests on the mainland.
- Despite unique visitors to House News in June 2014 topping 300 thousand, advertising revenues have been weak as the site has been shunned by many potential advertisers for political reasons. Consequently, there was little hope of it achieving break-even.
- The successor of House News is Stand News (立場新聞).

== See also ==
- HuffPost
- 2012 Hong Kong legislative election
- Pan-democracy camp
