= List of Hong Kong national security cases in 2021 =

The list below shows cases concerning the National Security laws of Hong Kong in 2021, including arrests, charges, investigations and enforcement operations made or conducted under the national security laws.

The Law of the People's Republic of China on Safeguarding National Security in the Hong Kong Special Administrative Region (National Security Law, or NSL) was imposed by the National People's Congress of China and came into effect on 30 June 2020. A second national security legislation, the Safeguarding National Security Ordinance (National Security Ordinance, SNSO), was enacted by the Legislative Council of Hong Kong to implement Article 23 of Hong Kong's constitution, the Basic Law, and took effect on 23 March 2024. The police operations involving national security elements are conducted by the National Security Department of the Hong Kong Police Force (National Security Department, NSD) in spite of suspected crimes neither related to the NSL nor the national security ordinance.

As of 1 September 2026, a total of 415 individuals had been arrested on suspicion of acts and activities endangering national security since the national security law was enacted, some of whom have been sentenced to jail.

== Cases ==
=== Hong Kong 47 (6 January 2021) ===
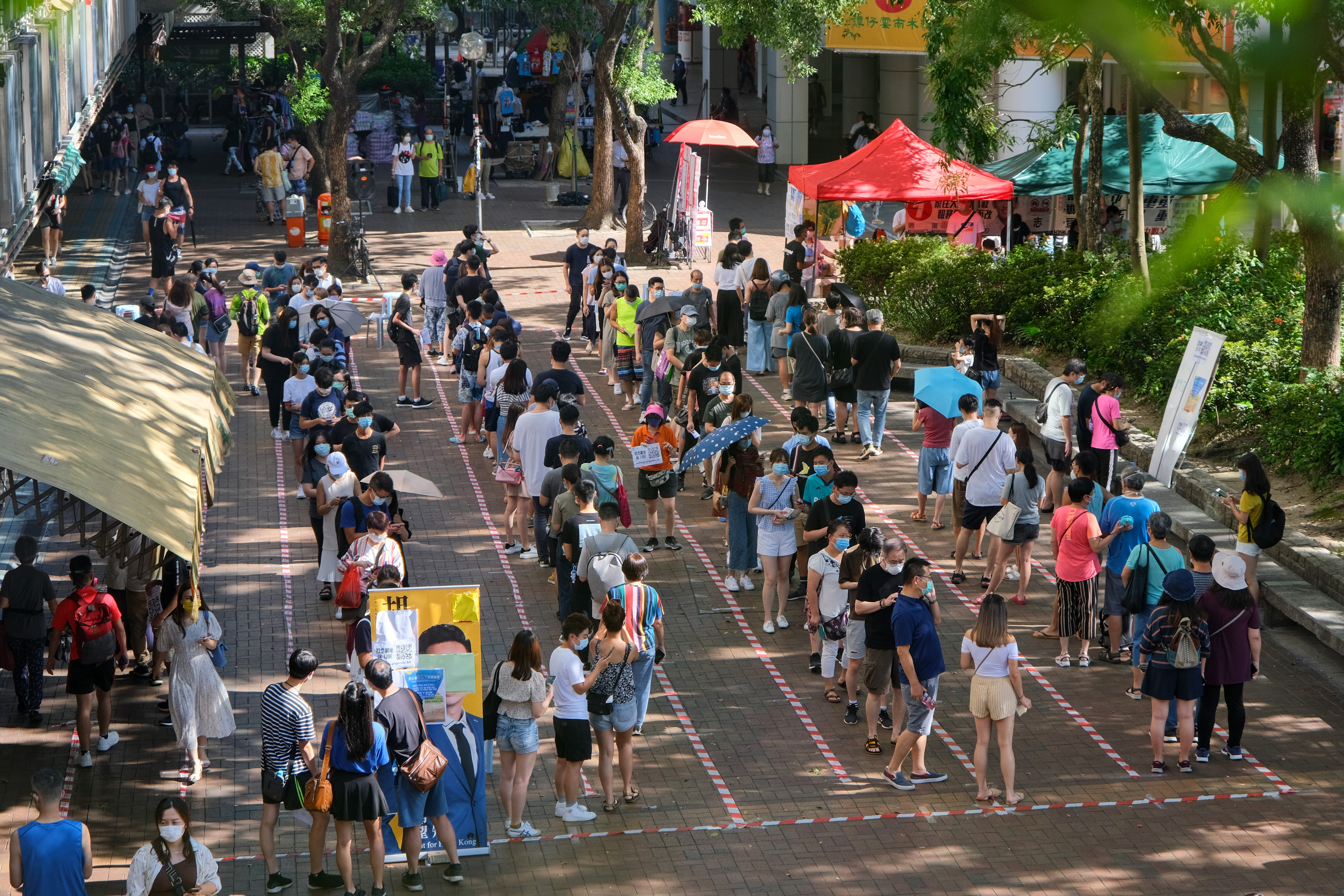
Long queue outside primaries polling station

Following the landslide win in the 2019 local elections, the pro-democracy camp aimed to win a majority in the Legislative Council through primaries and tactical voting, as the general election was expected to be held in September 2020, in order to force the government to accept the five demands proposed during protests. Benny Tai, former associate professor of law at the University of Hong Kong, wrote an article in April 2020 titled "10 Steps to Laam Chau – The Fate of Hong Kong", detailing the plan which could force the dissolution the Legislative Council and the resignation of Chief Executive, or else result in more violent clashes and foreign sanctions.

The unprecedented arrest operation by the National Security Department of the police force started in the early morning on 6 January 2021. 55 were arrested in connection with the primaries, including Joshua Wong and Tam Tak-chi, who were arrested in prison or jail as they were serving sentences for protest or remanding in custody for sedition case respectively. Sunny Cheung and Ted Hui self-exiled in 2020 and therefore were not arrested despite participating in the primaries. All but Wong and Tam, and Wu Chi-wai who was found to not have declared a foreign passport in relation to another case, were released on bail by 8 January.

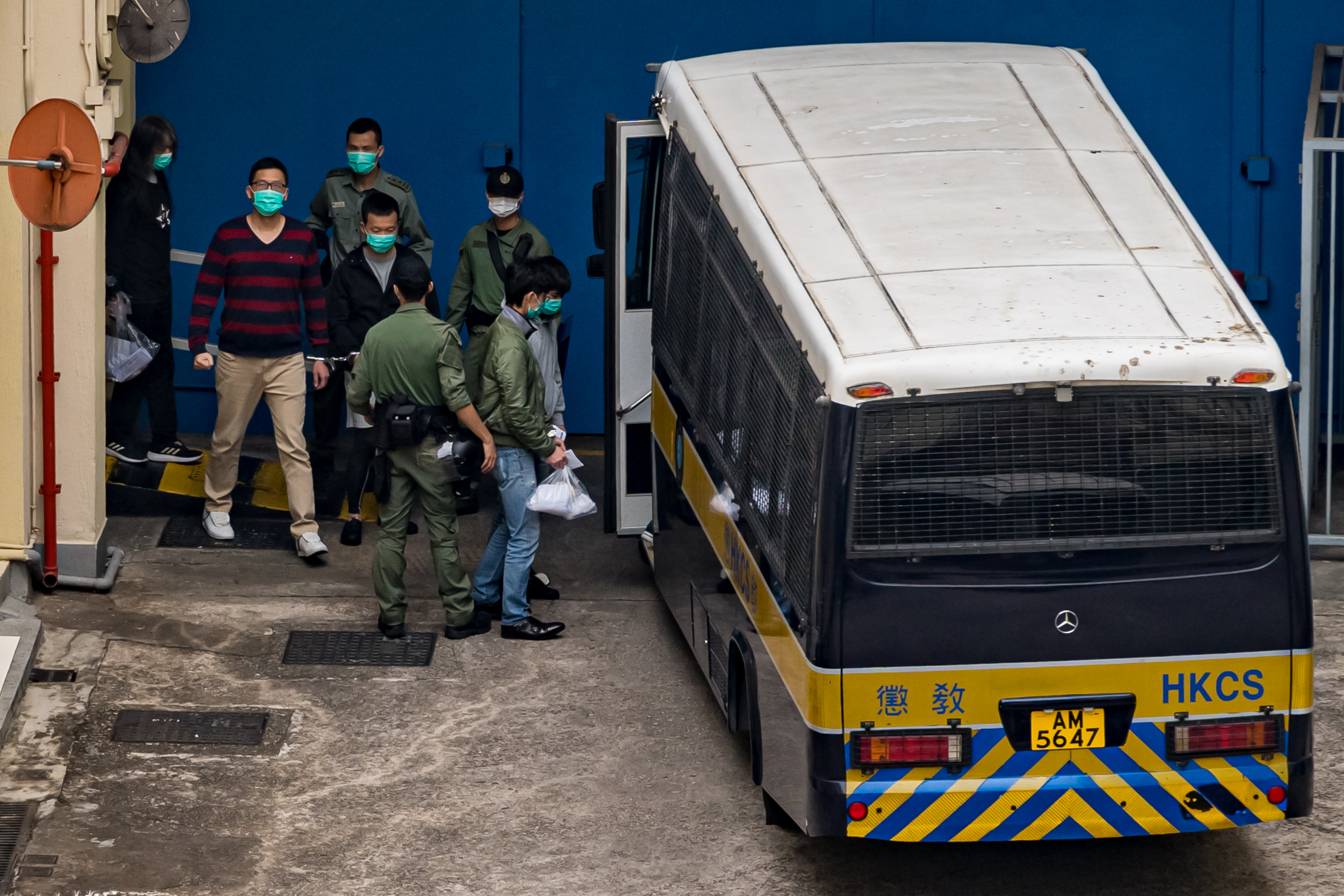
Lam Cheuk-ting and Raymond Chan, both charged and remanded, were brought to court.

On 28 February 2021, 47 of those 55 were charged with "conspiracy to subvert the state power", and were brought to court on the next day. The Magistrates' Court, for the first time, took four days to consider bail applications. Chief Magistrate Victor So let 15 be bailed out, but was immediately challenged by the Department of Justice (DOJ), hence all defendants had to stay behind bars. When the trial began in February 2023, only 13 defendants out of 47 were bailed out. Many quit their affiliated political parties and announced their retirement from politics. Owen Chow was re-arrested and remanded in January 2022 for breaching bail agreements, followed by Winnie Yu's bail being revoked in March 2022.

The restriction on reports of bail proceedings, stipulated in Section 9P of Criminal Procedure Ordinance and 87A of Magistrates Ordinance, was another controversy regarding National Security cases; a request by Gwyneth Ho to lift restrictions was turned down by the judge in September 2021, after which Ho instructed her lawyer to withdraw her bail application. The reporting ban was finally lifted on 18 August 2022 on request by Ho and three other defendants, after the verdict by the High Court over the Hong Kong Alliance case. The media then revealed 29 defendants are to plead guilty to the charges, while the other 17 are to stand trial in the High Court, namely Gwyneth Ho, Owen Chow, Ray Chan, Lam Cheuk-ting, Leung Kwok-hung, Ricky Or, Mike Lam, Lee Yue-shun, Winnie Yu, Michael Pang, Kalvin Ho, Lawrence Lau, Helena Wong, Sze Tak-loy, Ng Kin-wai. 11 of those were amongst the 13 bailed out.

The trial opened on 6 February 2023; the prosecutor said that Tai and four others were the election organizers and had indispensable involvement. is also the second national security case to be handled without a jury, after Paul Lam, Secretary for Justice, cited the "involvement of foreign elements", "personal safety of jurors and their family members", and a "risk of perverting the course of justice if the trial is conducted with a jury".

On 30 May 2024, 14 of 47 activists were convicted and found guilty while two activists were acquitted, namely Lawrence Lau and Lee Yue-shun. The convicted were remanded until their sentencing. The remaining 31 activists agreed to plead guilty. On 13 June, the Department of Justice announced that it would appeal against the acquittal of Lau but not that of Lee.

The prosecution is led by Jonathan Man Tak-ho and Anthony Chau.

On 19 November 2024, the 45 convicted activists were handed down prison sentences between 4 and 10 years by the High Court.

Name / Surname	Age	Accused of	Status
Benny Tai Yiu-ting	56	Subversion	Pleaded guilty jailed for 10 years
Owen Chow Ka-shing	24	Subversion	Found guilty jailed for 7 years, 9 months
Gordon Ng Ching-hang	42	Subversion	Found guilty jailed for 7 years, 3 months
Gwyneth Ho Kwai-lam	30	Subversion	Found guilty jailed for 7 years
Andrew Chiu Ka-yin	52	Subversion	Found guilty jailed for 7 years
Lam Cheuk-ting	43	Subversion	Found guilty jailed for 6 years, 9 months
Leung Kwok-hung	64	Subversion	Found guilty jailed for 6 years, 9 months
Winnie Yu Wai-ming	33	Subversion	Found guilty jailed for 6 years, 9 months
Au Nok-hin	33	Subversion	Pleaded guilty jailed for 6 years, 9 months
Ricky Or Yiu-lam	49	Subversion	Found guilty jailed for 6 years, 7 months
Kalvin Ho Kai-ming	32	Subversion	Found guilty jailed for 6 years, 7 months
Sze Tak-loy	38	Subversion	Found guilty jailed for 6 years, 7 months
Tat Cheng Tat-hung	32	Subversion	Found guilty jailed for 6 years, 6 months
Clarisse Yeung Suet-ying	34	Subversion	Found guilty jailed for 6 years, 6 months
Michael Pang Cheuk-kei	26	Subversion	Found guilty jailed for 6 years, 6 months
Helena Wong Pik-wan	61	Subversion	Found guilty jailed for 6 years, 6 months
Raymond Chan Chi-chuen	48	Subversion	Found guilty jailed for 6 years, 6 months
Ben Chung Kam-lun	33	Subversion	Pleaded guilty jailed for 6 years, 1 months
Ng Kin-wai	25	Subversion	Pleaded guilty jailed for 5 years, 7 months
Mike Lam King-nam	54	Subversion	Pleaded guilty jailed for 5 years, 2 months
Alvin Yeung Ngok-kiu	39	Subversion	Pleaded guilty jailed for 5 years, 1 months
Fergus Leung Fong-wai	23	Subversion	Pleaded guilty jailed for 4 years, 11 months
Sam Cheung Ho-sum	27	Subversion	Pleaded guilty jailed for 4 years, 11 months
Andrew Wan Siu-kin	51	Subversion	Pleaded guilty jailed for 4 years, 8 months
Joshua Wong Chi-fung	24	Subversion	Pleaded guilty jailed for 4 years, 8 months
Lester Shum Ngo-fai	27	Subversion	Pleaded guilty jailed for 4 years, 6 months
Tam Tak-chi	48	Subversion	Pleaded guilty jailed for 4 years, 5 months
Wu Chi-wai	58	Subversion	Pleaded guilty jailed for 4 years, 5 months
Eddie Chu Hoi-dick	43	Subversion	Pleaded guilty jailed for 4 years, 5 months
Prince Wong Ji-yuet	23	Subversion	Pleaded guilty jailed for 4 years, 5 months
Ventus Lau Wing-hong	27	Subversion	Pleaded guilty jailed for 4 years, 5 months
Frankie Fung Tat-chun	25	Subversion	Pleaded guilty jailed for 4 years, 5 months
Nathan Lau Chak-fung	24	Subversion	Pleaded guilty jailed for 4 years, 5 months
Carol Ng Man-yee	50	Subversion	Pleaded guilty jailed for 4 years, 5 months
Tiffany Yuen Ka-wai	27	Subversion	Pleaded guilty jailed for 4 years, 3 months
Roy Tam Hoi-pong	40	Subversion	Pleaded guilty jailed for 4 years, 3 months
Jimmy Sham Tsz-kit	33	Subversion	Pleaded guilty jailed for 4 years, 3 months
Kinda Li Ka-tat	29	Subversion	Pleaded guilty jailed for 4 years, 3 months
Hendrick Lui Chi-hang	38	Subversion	Pleaded guilty jailed for 4 years, 3 months
Henry Wong Pak-yu	30	Subversion	Pleaded guilty jailed for 4 years, 3 months
Andy Chui Chi-kin	53	Subversion	Pleaded guilty jailed for 4 years, 2 months
Claudia Mo Man-ching	64	Subversion	Pleaded guilty jailed for 4 years, 2 months
Jeremy Jansen Tam Man-ho	45	Subversion	Pleaded guilty jailed for 4 years, 2 months
Kwok Ka-ki	59	Subversion	Pleaded guilty jailed for 4 years, 2 months
Gary Fan Kwok-wai	54	Subversion	Pleaded guilty jailed for 4 years, 2 months
Lawrence Lau Wai-chung	53	Subversion	Acquitted
Lee Yue-shun	27	Subversion	Acquitted
Roy Kwong Chun-yu	38	Subversion	Not charged
James To Kun-sun	57	Subversion	Not charged
Joseph Lee Kok-long	61	Subversion	Not charged
Lee Chi-yung	40	Subversion	Not charged
Alterin Jeffrey Andrews	34	Subversion	Not charged
Michael Felix Lau Hoi-man	?	Subversion	Not charged
Yuen Wai-kit	?	Subversion	Not charged
John Joseph Clancey (Note: First foreign national arrested under the NSL)	79	Subversion	Not charged

=== Returning Valiant (5 May 2021) ===
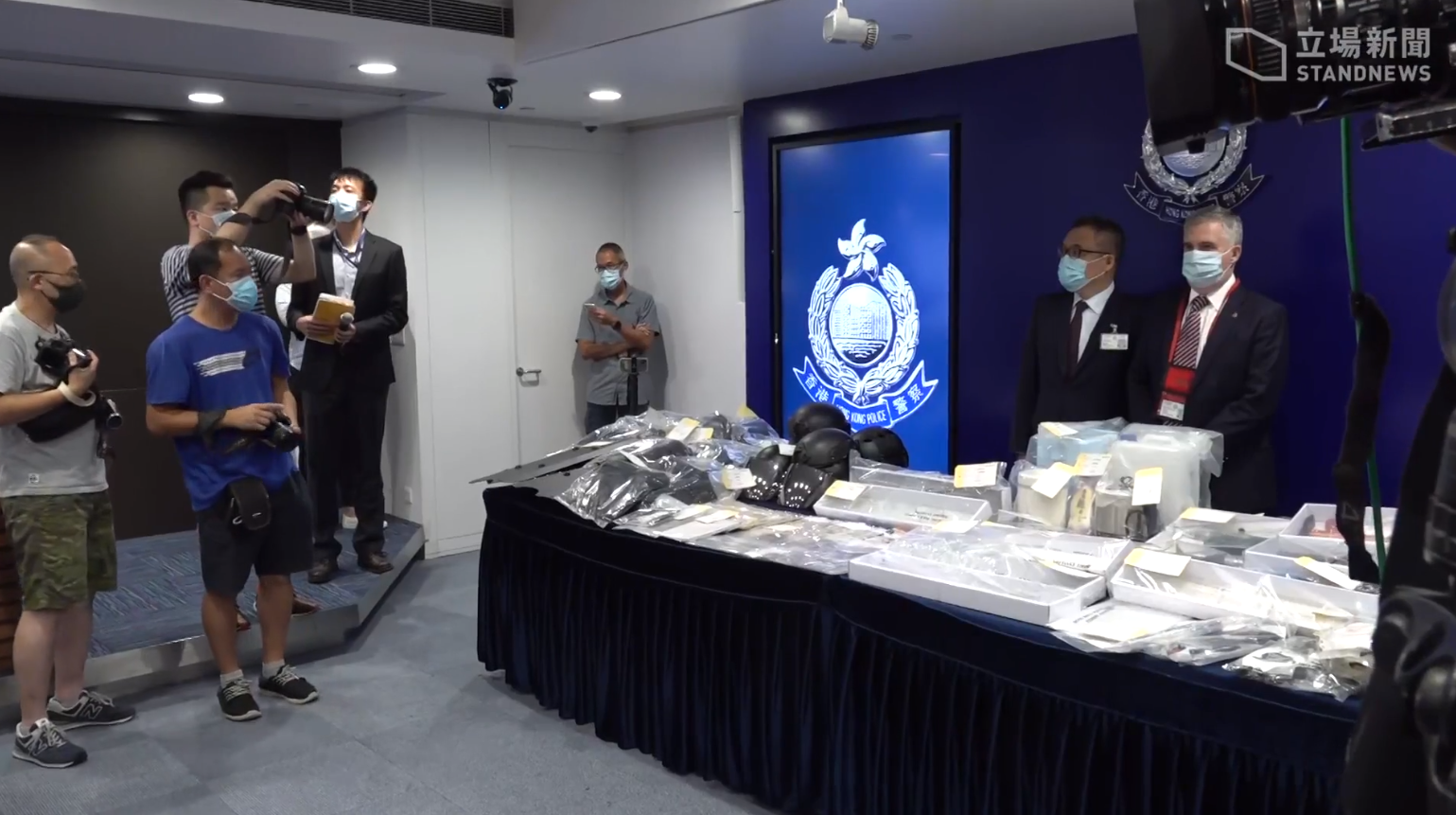
NSD seized TATP and weapons from Returning Valiant in July 2021

On 5 May 2021, four students (Lai Chun-hei, Yuen Ka-him, Chan Ching-hing, Choi Wing-kit) were reportedly arrested on location after sneaking into Po Leung Kuk Laws Foundation College, a secondary school in Tseung Kwan O. Police, during the search, discovered some belonged to Returning Valiant and had hid independence slogans at home, including former spokesman Yuen Ka-him. All were charged with housebreaking later and bailed out. The NSD arrested a total of seven individuals on 5 and 6 May, five were accused of subversion but were not indicted.

On 5 July 2021, nine members of Returning Valiant were arrested for alleged terrorist activities, six of whom were secondary school students. The NSD said the arrested had attempted to plant car bombs, attack cross-harbour tunnels, railways, court buildings, and public facilities across the city, using TATP; in a raid at a hostel in Tsim Sha Tsui, police had confiscated laboratory equipment for making that highly explosive substance. Three (Ho Yu-wang, Alexander Au Man, Chan Cheuk-hin) were charged, brought to court, and denied bail on 7 July. Others were granted bail by police. Five more were arrested on 12 July, and three (Kwok Man-hei, Chan Hoi-leung, Law Kai-wing) were charged on 14 July; they were remanded in custody, with their trial adjourned to 1 September. One more person (Su Wing-ching) was charged with terrorist activities on 1 September.

On 28 September 2021, seven were arrested by the NSD and charged with conspiracy to incite subversion of state power. At least 22 arrests had been made in relation to the case by the end of 2021. In late December 2021, Tseung Chau was granted bail under a list of conditions.

All seven pleaded guilty to subversion, including four minors. On 8 October 2022, five were sentenced to time in a training centre, where the period of detention ranges from six months to three years, making the four minors the first ones sentenced under the national security law.

For the housebreaking case, Lai Chun-hei, who had earlier pleaded guilty to assaulting a police officer, and Chan Ching-hing were both convicted by court on 9 February 2023. Yuen Ka-him and Choi Wing-kit, both accused of subversion, pleaded guilty respectively to possession of an apparatus for radiocommunications without licence and of offensive weapons. Yuen's charge of housebreaking and Choi's charge of possession of child pornography were kept on file. Choi Wing-kit and Chan Yau-tsun were respectively sentenced to prison for five years and three months, and five years, for conspiracy to incite subversion, the extra three months for Choi being due to the weapons found at his home. Both appealed their sentence in order to obtain a one-third reduction for their guilty pleas. The reduction had been denied to them by the judge on the grounds of five years being the minimum term for offences of a "serious nature". The two lodged their appeal, which became public in February 2023 after another arrestee, Lui Sai-yu, had done so in his own national security case.

On 6 May 2023, Ho Yu-wang pleaded guilty to conspiracy to plan terrorist activities under the NSL, while the other five pleaded guilty to the non-NSL alternative charge of conspiracy to cause explosion likely to endanger life or property. According to court, Ho, described by the prosecution as "mastermind" along with another man surnamed Cheung who was not arrested, had planned to plant a bomb in a court building by 15 July 2022, days after their arrests, and encouraged others to join him. A former member of Student Politicism surnamed Cheung, who was not arrested, was revealed to be another "mastermind" of the attack for providing financial support. On 25 May, Alexander Au was sentenced to 5 years and 8 months in prison, while three others were sent to a training centre. On 28 December, Ho was sentenced to 6 years in prison, while Kwok was sentenced to 30 months in prison for conspiracy to cause explosions; convicted on the latter charge, Cheung Ho-yeung received 6 years.

The prosecution was represented by Stella Lo.

Name	Age	Accused of	Status
Ho Yu-wang	17	Terrorist activities	Pleaded guilty jailed for 6 years
Cheung Ho-yeung	23	Terrorist activities	Pleaded guilty jailed for 6 years for: Causing explosion likely to endanger life or property
Alexander Au Man	19	Terrorist activities	Pleaded guilty jailed for 5 years, 8 months for: Causing explosion likely to endanger life or property
Choi Wing-kit	20	Inciting subversion	Pleaded guilty jailed for 5 years, 3 months for: Inciting subversion; Possessing offensive weapons
Chris Chan Yau-tsun	25	Inciting subversion	Pleaded guilty jailed for 6 years
Kwok Man-hei	18	Inciting subversion	Pleaded guilty jailed for 2.5 years
Kwok Man-hei	18	Terrorist activities	Pleaded guilty detention for: Causing explosion likely to endanger life or property
Yuen Ka-him (Note: Among the first four minors sentenced under the NSL)	16	Inciting subversion	Pleaded guilty detention for: Inciting subversion; Possession of an apparatus for radiocommunications without licence
Wan Chung-wai	15	Inciting subversion	Pleaded guilty detention
Leung Yung-wan	16	Inciting subversion	Pleaded guilty detention
Chiang Chau Ching-yu	16	Inciting subversion	Pleaded guilty detention
Chan Cheuk-hin	15	Terrorist activities	Pleaded guilty detention for: Causing explosion likely to endanger life or property
Christy Su Wing-ching	18	Terrorist activities	Pleaded guilty detention for: Causing explosion likely to endanger life or property
Law Kai-wing	15	Terrorist activities	Pleaded guilty detention for: Causing explosion likely to endanger life or property
Chan Hoi-leung	18	Terrorist activities	Charge withdrawn
Lai Chun-hei	19	Non NSL offence	Found guilty for: Housebreaking; Pleaded guilty to: Assaulting police officer in execution of duty
Chan Ching-hing	18	Non NSL offence	Found guilty for: Housebreaking
To Yi-Sze	39	Terrorist activities	Not charged
Shek Wing-sum	?	Terrorist activities	Not charged
Ng Man-ying	?	Terrorist activities	Not charged
Lam Chi-ming	37	Terrorist activities	Not charged
Wong Yun-to	28	Terrorist activities	Not charged
Yeung Sum-yi	17	Terrorist activities	Not charged
Cheng Ko-wan	19	Terrorist activities	Not charged

=== Publications (6 June 2021) ===
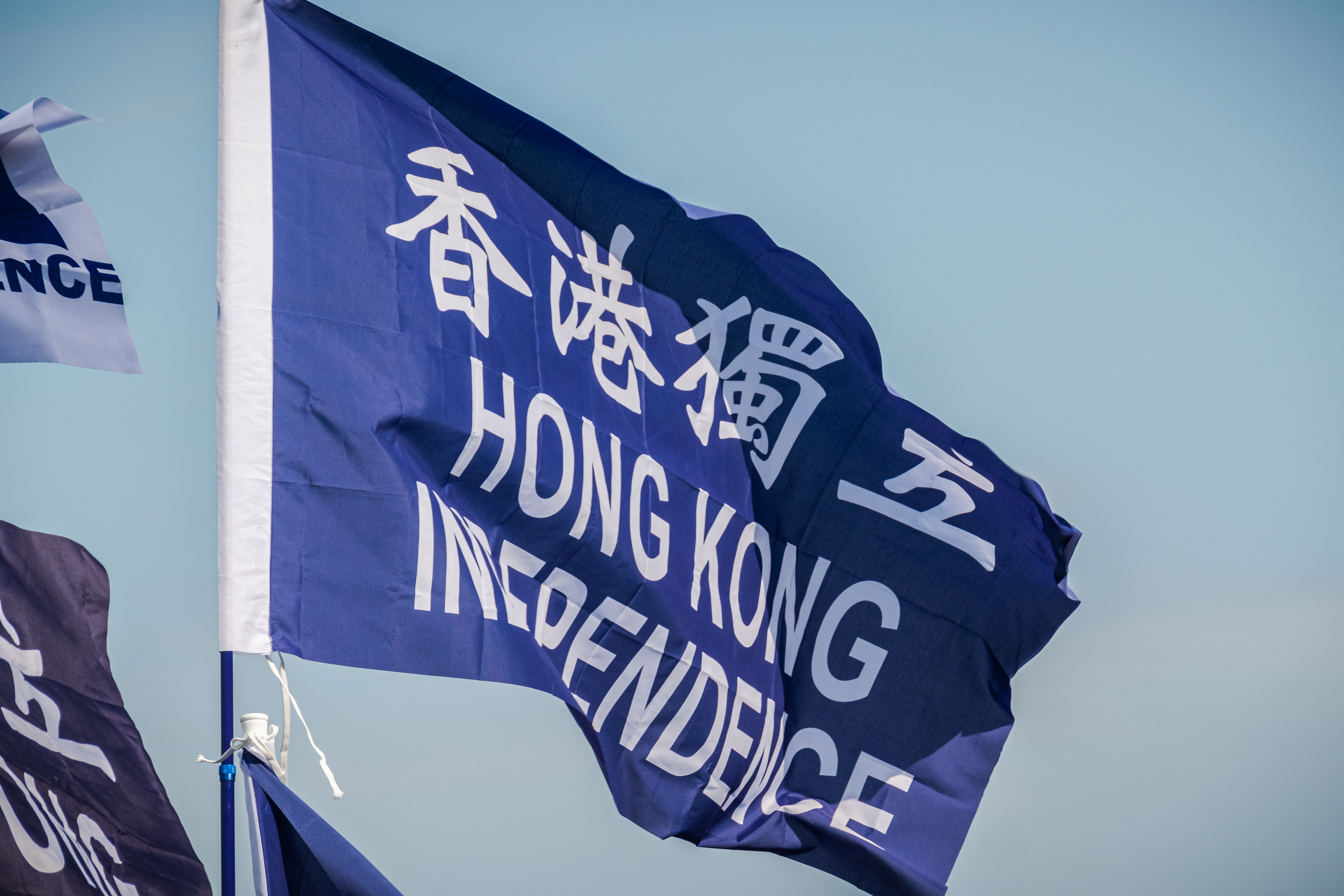
A flag reading "Hong Kong independence" at a protest in 2020

The National Security Department, on 6 June 2021, arrested a 45-year-old female clerk in Western District and a 17-year-old male secondary student in Sham Shui Po for allegedly having conspired between May and December 2020 to make and spread leaflets supporting Hong Kong independence, and which called for resisting "communisation". The duo was charged with "conspiracy to print, publish, distribute, display or reproduce seditious publications" on 8 June 2021, and remanded in custody. In August 2021 the male youth was given bail while the clerk remained behind bars, eventually being refused bail seven times. The two defendants agreed to plead guilty to the charges. The female clerk was jailed for 13.5 months on 31 January 2022, while the secondary student was sent to 9 months in a training centre.

Name	Age	Accused of	Status
Chloe Cho Suet-sum	46	Sedition	Pleaded guilty jailed for 1 years, 1.5 months
Wong Chun-wai	17	Sedition	Pleaded guilty detention

=== Publications (21 June 2021) ===
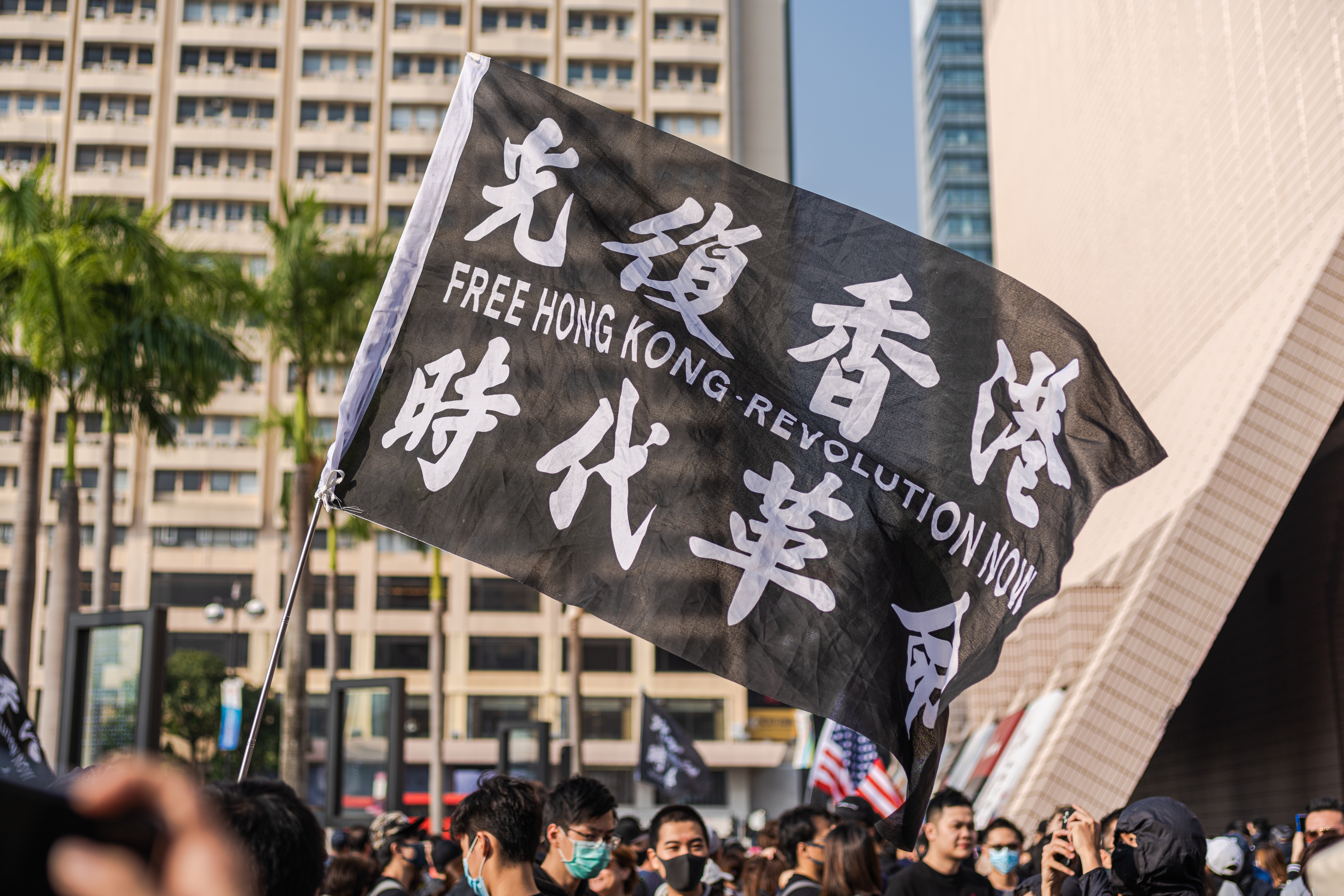
A flag reading "Free Hong Kong, revolution now", another translation for "Liberate Hong Kong, revolution of our times", at a protest in 2019

A 40-year-old male and a 36-year-old female were arrested on 21 and 25 June 2021, after displaying a flag showing the words "Liberate Hong Kong, revolution of our times" in a Mongkok Tong lau. Another 37-year-old male was arrested in Shaukeiwan after posting "Liberate Hong Kong, revolution of our times" fai chun and stickers on the door of the flat. All three were accused of seditious words or seditious intention, and were granted bail without being charged.

Surname	Age	Accused of	Status
Law	40	Sedition	Not charged
Unknown (female)	36	Sedition	Not charged
Unknown	37	Sedition	Not charged

=== General Union of Speech Therapists (22 July 2021) ===
The General Union of Hong Kong Speech Therapists was formed in November 2019 at the height of protests. The Union published three cartoon books surrounding wolves and sheep, named Guardians of the Sheep Village, 12 Warriors of the Sheep Village, and Dustman of the Sheep Village. The cartoon books, hinting political implications, were based on the 2019 protest, detainment of 12 Hongkongers, and the strike by medical workers at the beginning of COVID-19 pandemic.

Following condemnation by pro-Beijing camp and government officials, five from the General Union, three women and two men, were arrested on 22 July 2021, accused of violating the NSL. The NSD froze their assets amounting to around 160,000 HKD. Chairwoman Lai Man-ling and deputy chairwoman Melody Yeung were charged with seditious publication a day later, and denied bail. On 30 August, the remaining three bailed-out executives of the General Union, Secretary Sidney Ng, Treasurer Samuel Chan, and Fong Tsz-ho, were re-arrested and faced the same charge. All five were denied bail by the judges. In August 2021 the government announced that it would revoke the registration of the Union, which it carried through.

Sidney Ng later sought leave at the Court of Final Appeal to challenge the bail denial, arguing that the strict bail requirement shall not be applicable to non-NSL offences, only to be rejected in December 2021 as the court considered sedition is inevitably endangering National Security, and all offences possible to harm so shall subject to the bail threshold under the NSL.

All five defendants were found guilty of sedition charge on 7 September 2022, and they were sentenced to 19 months in prison on 10 September.

Name	Age	Accused of	Status
Lorie Lai Man-ling	25	Sedition	Found guilty jailed for 1 year, 7 months
Melody Yeung Yat-yee	27	Sedition	Found guilty jailed for 1 year, 7 months
Sidney Ng Hau-yi	28	Sedition	Found guilty jailed for 1 year, 7 months
Samuel Chan Yuen-sum	25	Sedition	Found guilty jailed for 1 year, 7 months
Fong Tsz-ho	26	Sedition	Found guilty jailed for 1 year, 7 months

=== Publications (6 August 2021) ===
On 6 August 2021, police arrested a 41-year-old property manager, Chiang Chung-sang, who appeared at West Kowloon Magistrates' Courts on 9 August. He was accused of having displayed seditious posters, and denied bail. On 26 January 2022, Chiang pleaded guilty to five out of eight counts of displaying and possessing physical and digital seditious publication, in reference to posters he had allegedly put up near a kindergarten in Tin Shui Wai and the High Court Building in June 2021, and 48 digital posters that had been found in his possession, which had been deemed of seditious nature and which contained words including, "police are Hong Kong’s largest criminal organisation." The judge said that the placement of the posters near the kindergarten would "poison [the children’s] hearts without their knowing", while the High Court posters would be a "challenge to the rule of law". On 31 January 2022 Chiang was sentenced to eight months in jail, the remaining three charges having been withdrawn by prosecutors according to local media.

Name	Age	Accused of	Status
Kim Chiang Chung-sang	41	Sedition	Pleaded guilty jailed for 8 months

=== HKUSU Council (18 August 2021) ===
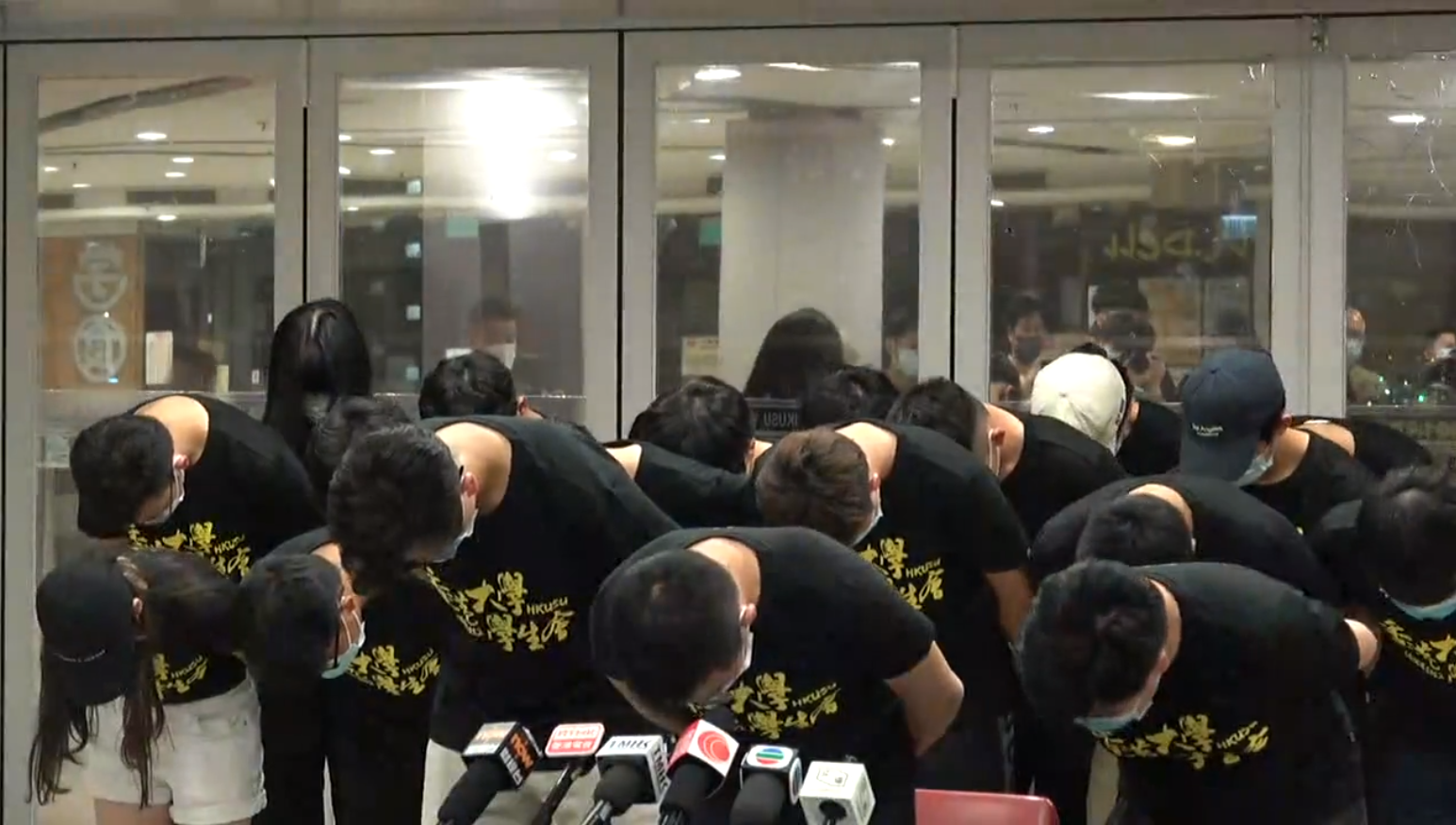
HKU student leaders resigned after the controversy

On 7 July 2021, the Hong Kong University Students' Union (HKUSU) Council passed a motion with 30 ayes, 2 abstentions, and no objection, that reads "the Union Council expresses its deep sadness at the death of Mr Leung Kin-fai; offers its sympathy and condolences to his family and friends; appreciates his sacrifice to Hong Kong" following the suicidal police stabbing by Leung on 1 July. The resolution soon met criticism and condemnation by the university, police, and Chief Executive for praising "terrorism", as what the government declared the suicidal attack was. Under pressure, all Union Executives along with many councillors resigned on 9 July, and revoked the motion. The university announced on 13 July that the Union would from that day no longer be recognised on campus. Three days later, the NSD entered the Union Building in HKU for case investigation. All students involved in the 7 July meeting were denied access to campus from 4 August.

On 18 August, the NSD arrested four HKU students (Kinson Cheung, chairman of HKUSU Council; Charles Kwok, former chairperson of HKUSU; Chris Todorovski, former student residence representative; and former Faculty of Arts representative Anthony Yung) for proposing, seconding, and voicing out support for the motion. The students were charged with advocating terrorism on the next day. Yung was granted bail on 27 August, and the other three defendants were bailed out on 24 September, marking the first time that all defendants in an NSL case had obtained bail. HKU students voted on the motion were invited to assist investigation in August 2021.

On 11 September 2023, as part of a plea deal with the prosecution, the four students pleaded guilty to the charge of incitement to wound with intent, with the prosecution dropping the charge of advocating terrorism in exchange. On 30 October, they were sentenced to 2 years in prison. The jail sentence was reduced to 15 months on appeal.

Name	Age	Accused of	Status
Kinson Cheung King-sang	19	Advocating terrorism	Pleaded guilty jailed for 15 months for: Incitement to wound with intent
Charles Kwok Wing-ho	20	Advocating terrorism	Pleaded guilty jailed for 15 months for: Incitement to wound with intent
Chris Todorovski Shing-hang	18	Advocating terrorism	Pleaded guilty jailed for 15 months for: Incitement to wound with intent
Anthony Yung Chung-hei	19	Advocating terrorism	Pleaded guilty jailed for 15 months for: Incitement to wound with intent

=== Hong Kong Alliance (8 September 2021) ===
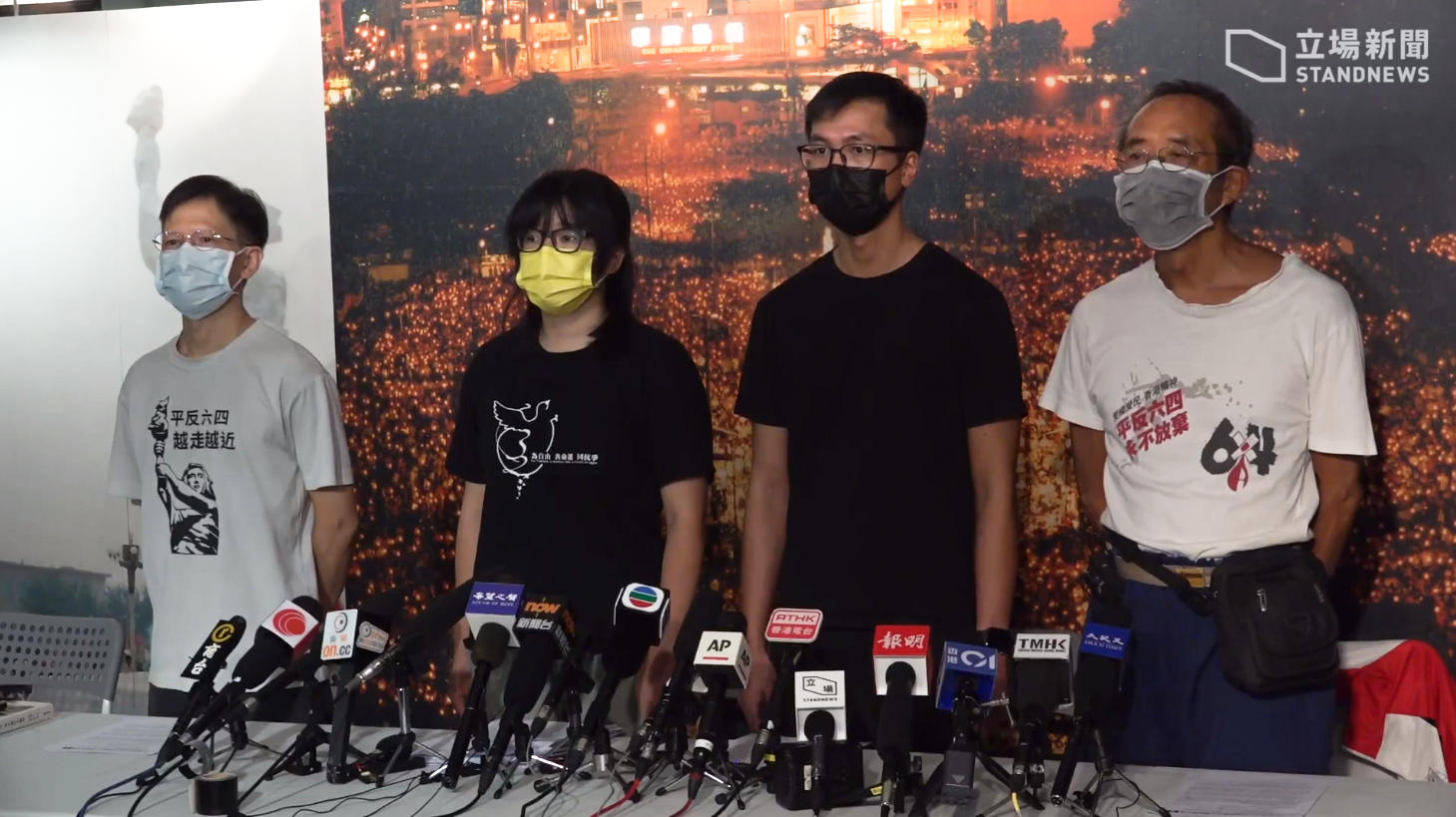
Members of the Hong Kong Alliance announcing not to submit information under a police request, and to hold a general meeting on its dissolution

The Hong Kong Alliance in Support of Patriotic Democratic Movements of China, founded in the spring of 1989 to support democratic and labour movements in mainland China, was best known for organising annual memorial vigils for the victims of the 1989 Tiananmen Square protests and massacre. Its stated goals included ending one-party dictatorship.

In 2020, the police banned the vigil for the first time, citing the ongoing anti-pandemic restrictions but at the time when the NSL was about to decree. Many still joined the vigil, including 26 leading democrats, who would be arrested and charged later. Following the imposition of the NSL, pro-Beijing camp reaffirmed the attack against the Alliance for breaching the Law. The pressure surged in mid-June 2021, days after the banned 2021 vigil, after Luo Huining, director of the Hong Kong Liaison Office of the Chinese Government, said the call for ending one-party dictatorship undermines the basis of "one country, two systems", without naming the Alliance.

On 25 August, standing committee members of the Alliance received letters from the NSD which, under power conferred by the Implementation Rules for Article 43 of the NSL, asked the Hong Kong Alliance to provide information for investigation, stating that the police commissioner had "sufficient reasons" to believe that the Alliance was acting on behalf of foreign entities. In a rebuttal letter which the Alliance handed in to police on 7 September, it rejected the claims and declined to provide information. Officials soon warned the activists of the legal consequences.

On 8 and 9 September 2021, vice-chairwoman Chow Hang-tung, and four other standing committee members, Simon Leung Kam-wai, Tsui Hon-kwong, Tang Ngok-kwan and Chan To-wai, were arrested for failing to provide information. The premises of the Alliance and the June 4th Museum were raided by police on 9 September. Later in the evening, the Hong Kong Alliance, chairman Lee Cheuk-yan, vice-chairman Albert Ho and Chow Hang-tung were charged with inciting subversion; Chow and the other four committee members faced an additional offence of failing to provide information. Bails were all denied, but restrictions on reporting were relaxed. The Alliance approved dissolution on 25 September and began the liquidation, but their property were frozen by the NSD four days later, obstructing the liquidation.

On 22 October, the judge approved bail applications by all, consider the time they remanded in custody could exceed the highest possible penalty. Chow and Leung attempted to refuse bail to avoid restrictions on free speech, but were rejected by the magistrate. Leung pleaded guilty on 22 December, with the judge asking Leung's representative to confirm the plea and thus proving that Leung had not done so under duress, and was imprisoned for 3 months. Chan pleaded guilty on 10 May 2022 and was imprisoned for 3 months. Chow, Tang and Tsui were found guilty after trial and were jailed for 4.5 months. The Court of Final Appeal ruled in their favour in 2025, and quashed the conviction of the trio.

The Alliance, before liquidation procedures were completed, were struck off from the Companies Registry through an order from Chief Executive Carrie Lam on 26 October. The government announcement stated that the five operational goals of the Alliance amounted to "subverting state power".

In April 2022, a magistrate rejected an application by Chow to have reporting restrictions on her committal proceedings lifted. A judicial review of the decision that Chow had requested in May at the High Court was successful: in what was considered a landmark decision that could extend to cases under the NSL, the court ruled on 2 August 2022 that the restriction on media reporting had to be lifted. The ban in Chow's case was lifted on 17 August, marking the first amongst the national security cases.

In September 2026, three leaders of the Alliance were sentenced to jail terms and the Alliance fined 1.5 million Hong Kong dollars over the incitement to subversion case.

==== Albert Ho (21 March 2023) ====
Albert Ho was granted bail on 22 August 2022 after he desired to seek medical treatment for lung cancer.

The NSD on 21 March 2023, however, re-arrested Ho for, as per a police statement, perverting the course of public justice, by allegedly interfering with a trial witness of the Hong Kong 47 case, or, according to sources speaking to local media, with several witnesses. On 22 March, Ho was remanded in custody by a magistrate after his bail was revoked.

The United Nations on 28 March urged the Hong Kong authorities to release Albert Ho to continue his urgent medical care, saying his health was in a critical condition.

Name	Age	Accused of	Status
Hong Kong Alliance in Support of Patriotic Democratic Movements of China	N/A	Inciting subversion	Found guilty Forced disbandment fined 1.5 million HKD
Lee Cheuk-yan	64	Inciting subversion	Found guilty jailed for 7 years
Albert Ho Chun-yan	69	Inciting subversion	Pleaded guilty jailed for 5 years, 2 months
Chow Hang-tung	36	Inciting subversion	Found guilty jailed for 4.5 months
Chow Hang-tung	36	Failing to provide information	Acquitted on appeal
Simon Leung Kam-wai	36	Failing to provide information	Pleaded guilty jailed for 3 months
Chan To-wai	57	Failing to provide information	Pleaded guilty jailed for 3 months
Tang Ngok-kwan	53	Failing to provide information	Acquitted on appeal
Tsui Hon-kwong	72	Failing to provide information	Acquitted on appeal

=== Student Politicism (20 September 2021) ===
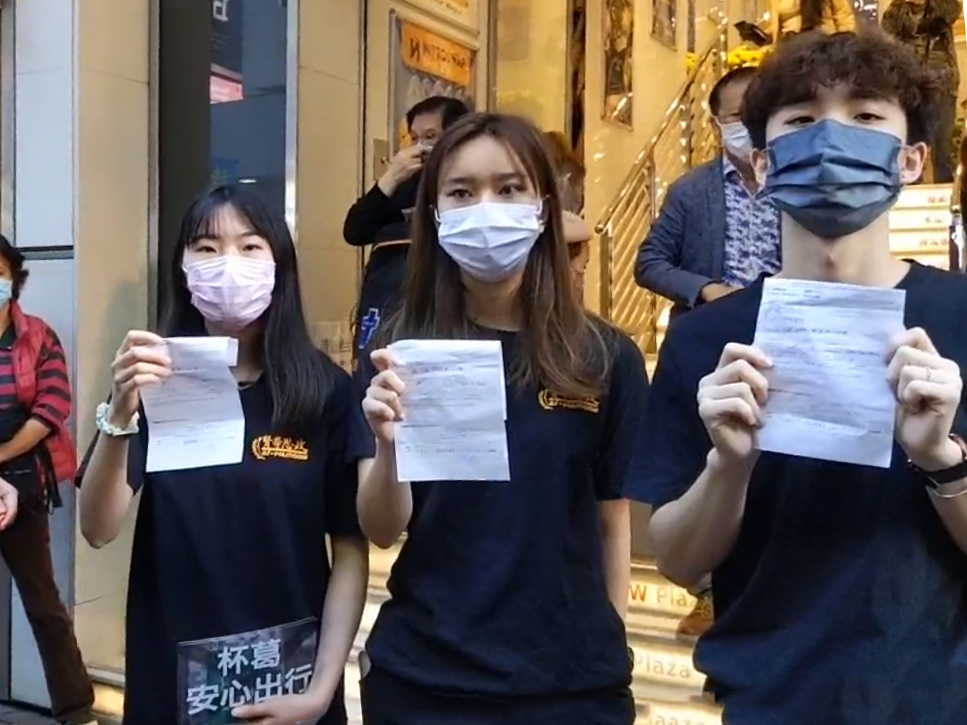
Student Politicism core members in February 2021, with Wong Yat-chin, the convenor, on the right

Student Politicism, a localist student activism group, was formed in May 2020. The group set up street booths to raise public awareness on various social and political issues. Police arrested their members for multiple times between September 2020 and July 2021, with accusations ranging from misconduct in public places, refusing police order, promoting an unauthorized assembly, to distributing seditious publications. Wong Yat-chin, convenor of the group and one of the last well-known remaining activists in Hong Kong not charged by authorities, was warned by these of violating the NSL.

On 20 September 2021, convenor Wong Yat-chin, secretary-general Chan Chi-sum, and former spokeswoman Jessica Chu were arrested by the national security unit of the police, for allegedly inciting subversion, as per local news reports. A storage unit of Student Politicism in Kwai Chung was also raided. According to photos appearing in local media, books, face masks, chocolate and biscuits were among the items seized. Bails were denied after being brought to court. Spokesperson Wong Yuen-lam surrendered to police on 22 September, and was also charged. Student Politicism announced disbandment on 24 September. Only Chu was eventually granted bail, which she however asked to be revoked in July 2022.

On 23 October 2022, Wong Yat-chin, Chan Chi-sum and Jessica Chu were sentenced to 30 to 36 months in prison, while Wong Yuen-lam was sent to a training centre.

Name	Age	Accused of	Status
Wong Yat-chin	20	Inciting subversion	Pleaded guilty jailed for 3 years
Chan Chi-sum	20	Inciting subversion	Pleaded guilty jailed for 2 years, 10 months
Jessica Chu Wai-ying	18	Inciting subversion	Pleaded guilty jailed for 2.5 years
Alice Wong Yuen-lam	19	Inciting subversion	Pleaded guilty sent to training centre

=== Online posts (11 November 2021) ===
Police announced on 12 November 2021 that they had made an arrest in Sha Tin the previous day under the colonial-era Crimes Ordinance. The arrested, a 26-year-old male surnamed Chui who had formerly served in the police force, was charged with acting with "seditious intent" through posts on the Facebook page of the police, and that of himself, with an alleged intent to "incite hatred" against the government and "raise discontent" among the population of Hong Kong. Police said that the posts in question were in relation to the death of Lam Yuen-yee, a marine police officer, during an anti-smuggling operation in September 2021. Chui was released on bail. He was convicted of sedition on 27 February 2023 and given a 10-month jail sentence on 20 March.

Name	Age	Accused of	Status
Chui Chun-man	26	Sedition	Found guilty jailed for 10 months

=== Online posts (16 December 2021) ===
On 16 December 2021, 22-year-old Chan Tai-sum was arrested over allegedly seditious comments on LIHKG, an online forum, and on Telegram. Chan was charged with one count of inciting unlawful assemblies to be held on Christmas Eve in Causeway Bay and Yau Tsim Mong, and six counts of actions with seditious intent on 18 December, with bail denied. Chan eventually faced three charges over sedition. Four more were arrested on 23 December for inciting unlawful assemblies, criminal damage and with intention to cause grievous bodily harm, over urging for a "Christmas Eve revolution" via Facebook and Telegram.

The lawyer representing Chan disputed the legality of the District Court to hear sedition cases, arguing the charge was exempt from a rule stating that "indictable offences" were to be transferred to the District Court on request of the prosecution, and demanded the trial be stood in High Court with jury. The application was denied by the judge in District Court, who ruled that while the offence of sedition was a summary offence, it could be transferred to the District Court together with the indictable offence of taking part in an illegal assembly. Chan pleaded guilty in October 2022 and was sentenced to 12 months in prison in November.

Name	Age	Accused of	Status
Chan Tai-sum	22	Sedition	Pleaded guilty jailed for 1 year for: Act with seditious intention; Inciting unlawful assemblies
Unknown	22	Non NSL offence	Not charged
Unknown	52	Non NSL offence	Not charged
Unknown	?	Non NSL offence	Not charged
Unknown	?	Non NSL offence	Not charged

=== Stand News (29 December 2021) ===
Logo of Stand News

Stand News, founded in December 2014, was a long-time pro-democracy online media outlet. It gained prominence during the 2019–2020 Hong Kong protests for its frontline reporting and livestreaming, earning a top rating in credibility among ten online media outlets in 2019. The pro-Beijing camp condemned Stand News as promoting fake news and harming National Security. After Apple Daily ceased operation, Stand News, in June 2021, deleted posts from bloggers and readers. Six also resigned from the board of directors. On 3 December, Chris Tang, Secretary of Security, sharply criticised the reporting by Stand News the "smart prison" of Tai Tam Gap Correctional Institution. Stand News rejected Tang's claims.

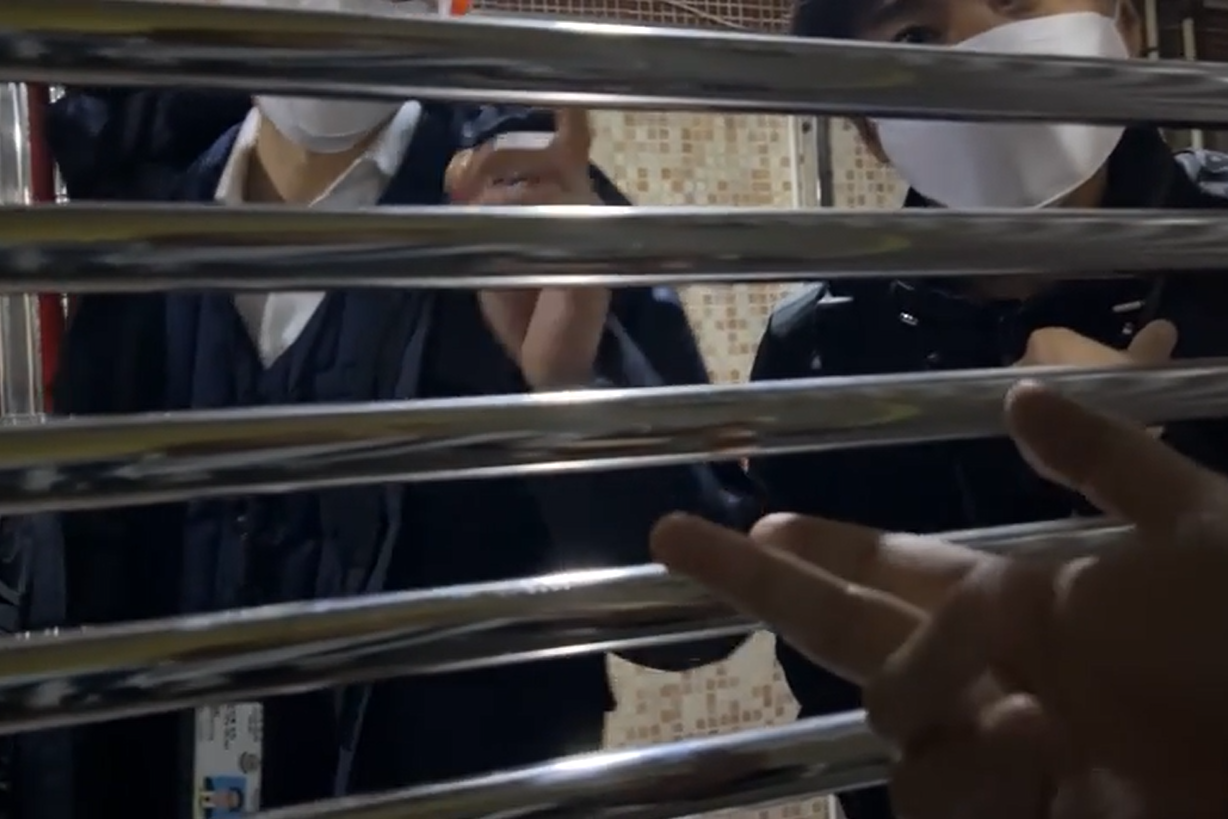
Ronson Chan, deputy assignment editor at Stand News, was asked by police to assist the investigation, in what was the final Stand News live.

On 29 December 2021, the NSD arrested six current and former executives of Stand News for suspected conspiracy to publish seditious publications. The arrested were former editor-in-chief Chung Pui-kuen, acting editor-in-chief Patrick Lam, former director Chow Tat-chi, Margaret Ng, Christine Fang, and Denise Ho. HKJA chairperson Ronson Chan, who was a deputy assignment editor at Stand News, was taken by police for assisting in the probe but not arrested. Chung's wife, Chan Pui-man, was re-arrested in jail. Lam reportedly resigned as chief editor immediately after the arrest. Former director Joseph Lin, and co-founders of the news outlet Yu Ka-fai, Tony Choi, were reportedly wanted by the police.

Hours after the arrest, Stand News announced its shutdown. Its website and most of its social media feeds and websites vanished after 11 pm. Its British bureau disbanded the next day.

Chung, Lam, and Best Pencil (Hong Kong) Limited, the owner of Stand News, were charged with seditious publication on 30 December. The four others were released on police bail. Bails were denied for both Chung and Lam. Police froze HK$61 million (US$7.8 million) of Stand News' assets.

On 11 April 2022, veteran journalist Allan Au was arrested in Kwai Chung by the NSD for allegedly, as per a press release by police on the same day which did not name Au, conspiring to publish seditious materials. Local reports said the arrest was related to the Stand News case. A professional consultant at the School of Journalism of the Chinese University at the time of the arrest, Au had worked at TVB News and RTHK, and was a columnist for outlets including Stand News and Ming Pao. Au was released on bail the following day and was not charged.

On 7 November, Lam was released on bail, after a lawyer for him and Chung applied for the termination of their sedition trial. On 13 December, Chung was also released on bail, after he was unable to review all of the new material from remand.

The lead prosecutor in the case is Laura Ng, who was criticized by the defence for submitting four new boxes of materials in February 2023. Prosecutor Jennifer Tsui also the prosecution team as Ng's deputy.

Chung and Lam were found guilty of sedition on 29 August 2024. The judgement said that, of the 17 Stand News articles considered by the court, 11 were found to be seditious. The two were released on bail. The parent company, Best Pencil, was also convicted. On 26 September, Chung was sentenced to 21 months, while Lam received 11 months; the judge ordered Lam to be released immediately on health grounds.

Name	Age	Accused of	Status
Best Pencil (Hong Kong) Limited	N/A	Sedition	Found guilty Assets frozen
Chung Pui-kuen	52	Sedition	Found guilty jailed for 1 year, 9 months
Patrick Lam Shiu-tung	34	Sedition	Found guilty jailed for 11 months
Chan Pui-man	51	Sedition	Not charged (see Apple Daily)
Chow Tat-chi	63	Sedition	Not charged
Margaret Ng Ngoi-yee	73	Sedition	Not charged
Christine Fang Meng-sang	63	Sedition	Not charged
Denise Ho Wan-see	44	Sedition	Not charged
Allan Au Ka-lun	54	Sedition	Not charged
Tony Tsoi Tung-ho	57	Sedition	Wanted
Joseph Lian Yi-zheng	70	Sedition	Wanted
Yu Ka-fai	?	Sedition	Wanted
