= John Clancey =

American human rights lawyer

- 關尚義
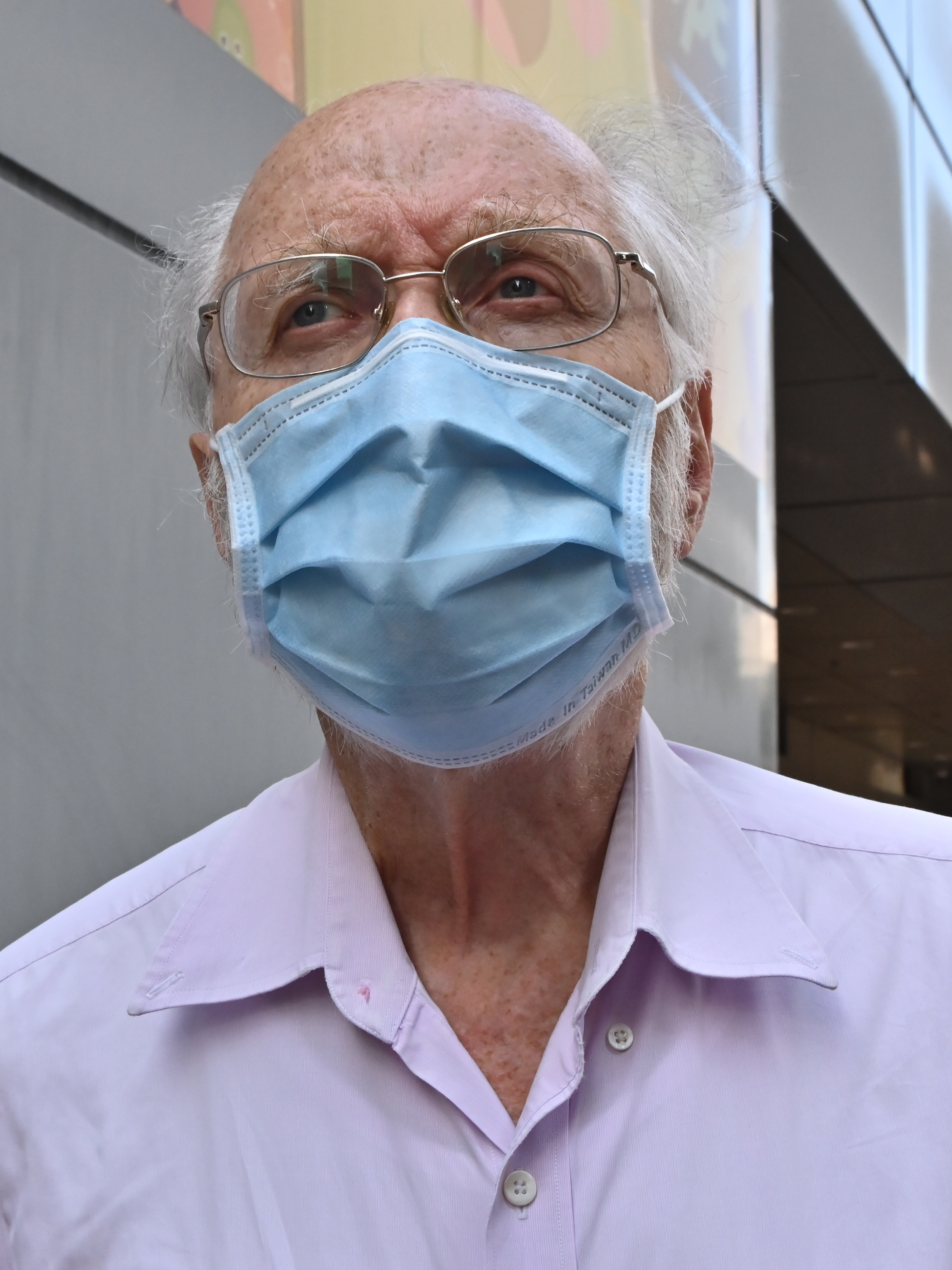
- Clancey in 2021
- Born: 1941 or 1942 (age 84–85); Jersey City, New Jersey, United States
- Education: Maryknoll College (BA); University of the State of New York (MA, MDiv); University of London (LLB); University of Hong Kong (PCLL)
- Occupation: Human rights lawyer
- Known for: First foreigner arrested under Hong Kong security law
- Political party: Power for Democracy (until 2021)
- Spouse: Edith To (m. 1985)

John Joseph Clancey (Chinese: 關尚義; Jyutping: Gwaan1 Seong6 Ji6) is a Hong Kong–based American human rights lawyer, and the first foreigner arrested under the Hong Kong national security law for his role in the 2020 Hong Kong pro-democracy primaries.

Clancey is a Hong Kong permanent resident, and serves as the chairman of the Asian Human Rights Commission, and formerly the treasurer of Power for Democracy, a Hong Kong pro-democracy platform.

== Priest ==
Born in New Jersey, United States, Clancey first moved to Hong Kong in 1968 as a Catholic missionary priest, at the time when churches retreated to Hong Kong from China after the victory of Mao Zedong in the Chinese Civil War in 1949. Clancey, who then mainly helped with welfare and relief in the poverty-hit Hong Kong, left the priesthood to marry his wife Edith To in 1985. Clancey is, nevertheless, still a prominent member of Hong Kong's Catholic community.

After years of living in Hong Kong, Clancey can speak fluent Cantonese.

== Legal career ==
Clancey was admitted to practice as a solicitor in Hong Kong in 1997 after retraining, and has been working as a solicitor with Ho Tse Wai & Partners since his admission, a firm known for taking on pro-bono cases and human rights work, and also hired by numerous opposition figures. He mainly handled medical negligence and personal injury cases, and appears as an advocate in coroner's inquests. He also acts for applicants in Basic Law related judicial review cases. He was also admitted to England and Wales in 1998.

Clancey has a long history of human rights campaigning, from opposing the Vietnam War to calling for democracy in Hong Kong. He said he has campaigned to uphold international democratic standards that Hongkongers have marched for.

Between December 10, 2006, and August 26, 2021, Clancey was also a member of the Election Committee, responsible for electing the Chief Executive, in the legal constituency.

== Arrest ==
On January 6, 2021, Clancey was arrested by the national security police on suspicion of "subversion", during the raid of the law firm. Power for Democracy, which he served as a treasurer, was involved in the pro-democracy primaries for the now-delayed legislative election. This was the first time a foreign national was detained under the security law, with analysts saying this signaled rising pressure on human-rights advocates.

When asked if he had anything to say to Hongkongers as he is slowly led away by police, Clancey replied "continue to work for democracy and human rights in Hong Kong". He was accused by the police for "organising" the primaries, along with Benny Tai, Au Nok-hin, Andrew Chiu, Ben Chung, and Gordon Ng. He was released on police bail, and was the only organiser not charged with subversion when others were brought to court in late February.
