= Hong Kong 12 =

Group of Hong Kong protesters arrested in 2020

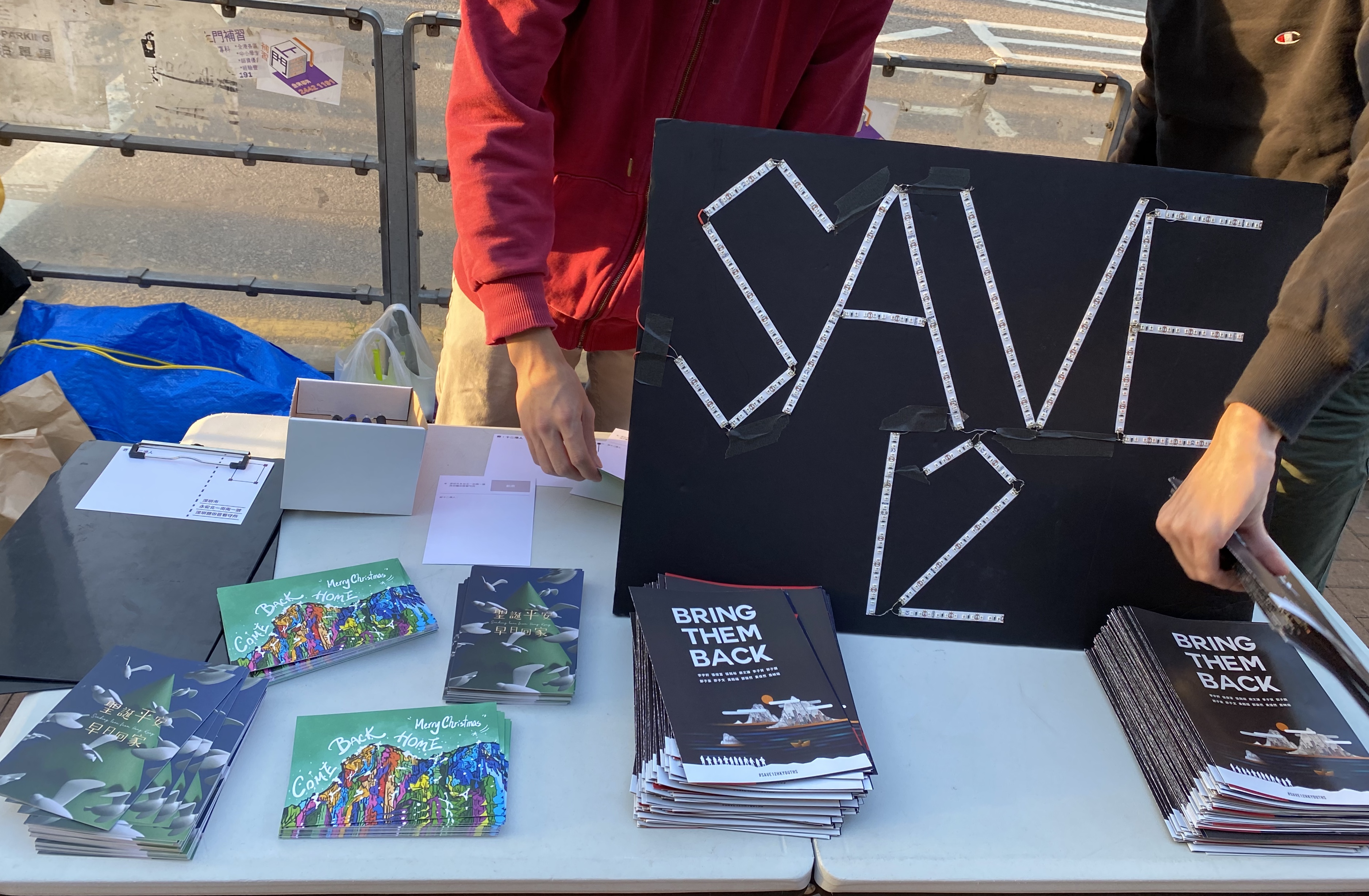
"Save 12" campaign demanding the release of the captured Hong Kong protesters by Chinese authorities

Hong Kong 12, or 12 Hongkongers, are the twelve Hong Kong protesters previously arrested by the Hong Kong Police Force (HKPF), detained by the Chinese authorities in 2020 at sea after a failed attempt to flee to Taiwan.

In a post on Chinese social media dated August 26, 2020, the China Coast Guard claimed that Guangdong authorities had intercepted a speedboat on August 23 under the suspicion of illegal border crossing and that more than ten people had been detained. The released coordinates put the incident in the South China Sea, approximately 78 kilometres (48 mi) from Hong Kong Island. On August 27, The Guardian cited two Hong Kong news outlets which reported, based on unnamed sources, that in the incident, a total of 12 people had been detained en route to Taiwan, of whom at least ten were Hong Kong residents. Referring to the same sources, the passengers had included activist Andy Li, who had been arrested on August 10 under charges related to the national security law and released on bail. HKPF chief Chris Tang told media on August 27 that he had heard the reports on the detention and that the force was actively seeking information from the mainland authorities.

Chinese authorities only released scant information on the situation of the detainees. On September 13, Chinese authorities announced that the detained had been brought to the Yantian Detention Centre in Shenzhen and put under "compulsory criminal detention". In a Twitter message from the same day, mainland government spokesperson Hua Chunying referred to the detainees as "elements" who had intended to separate Hong Kong from mainland China. Authorities repeatedly denied the detainees access to their families' appointed lawyers. Detention authorities claimed that the detainees had accepted government-appointed lawyers, which was denied by the families. Secretary of Security John Lee implied in statements made around that time that the Hong Kong government would not interfere with mainland law enforcement in the case.

On December 16, Yantian District authorities announced that a trial hearing was to be held in which the two oldest detainees, Quinn Moon and Tang Kai-yin, would be prosecuted for organising others to cross the border illegally, and eight would be prosecuted for crossing the border illegally. A trial hearing for the two underage defendants would be closed off to the public; they were returned to HKPF on December 28, where they were facing extra charges for allegedly absconding.

At a December 28 trial – where no relatives, Hong Kong media, or foreign ambassador representatives were allowed to audit the hearing, contrary to what the court said –, eight of the ten defendants of age were sentenced to seven months of prison terms for illegal border crossing. Quinn Moon and Tang Kai-yin were sentenced to terms of two and three years, respectively. The eight defendants of age were returned to Hong Kong police on March 22, 2021. They were held in quarantine upon arrival while local courts began hearings on their cases, with Andy Li being charged under the national security law.

The incident gained attention in Hong Kong and internationally, with US Secretary of State Mike Pompeo releasing a press statement on September 11 in which he expressed his concern both about the detainees' welfare and their lack of access to family-appointed lawyers. On December 29, 2020, the European Union demanded fair trials and the release of the 12 detainees.

== Presumed identities of the detainees ==
In its initial notice, the Guangdong Coast Guard released only the surnames of two of the detainees, Li and Tang, but no other information about names. The South China Morning Post reported that activist Andy Li was the Li referred to. As the full names were first published by pro-Beijing media Wen Wei Po, even some family members had doubts about their veracity. Meanwhile, the Hong Kong Security Bureau said that it had received advice from its mainland counterpart that the ages of the detainees ranged from 16 to 33. As of October 3, no one from Hong Kong has confirmed their identities. Two of the detained have British National Overseas passports, while a third has Hong Kong and Portuguese permanent residencies.

- Tang Kai-yin (鄧棨然)(30): Arrested and charged for attempted arson when police found bomb-making materials in Wan Chai. Named by Chinese notice as "suspect with surname Tang" as the full name has never been released officially, Tang is charged of being the leader of the group who steered the boat.
- Andy Li (李宇軒)(29): Founding member of pro-democracy advocacy group "Hong Kong Story" and has deep ties with anti-government international group Stand with Hong Kong and local protest group "Dragon Slaying Brigade". He was arrested by Hong Kong police on August 10 for alleged money laundering and breaching the new national security law, specifically for "colluding with foreign powers". He is the only one of the twelve who is alleged to have violated the national security law and thus is the only one possibly not tried under Hong Kong judiciary system.
- Wong Wai-Yin (黃偉然)(29): Wong was arrested on January 16, 2020, after a police raid at his home near a border town resulted in the seizure of chemicals, electronic equipment and other items that they suspected could be used to make explosives. He was released on bail on February 14 and ordered to report to his local police office daily. Wong's last police station reporting was on August 22, and he did not show up to court on August 24. A Hong Kong court issued an arrest warrant for Wong on August 26.
- Li Tsz-Yin (李子賢)(29): Li was arrested in Hong Kong for alleged "rioting" on September 29, 2019, and had already been in court.
- Cheung Chun Fu (張俊富)(22): Hong Kong Open University student. Cheung was arrested by Hong Kong police for illicit weapon possession and was on bail.
- Yim Man-Him (嚴文謙)(21): Along with Cheung, Yim was also arrested by Hong Kong police on the same day and was on bail.
- Cheung Ming-Yu (張銘裕)(20): At the time of his capture, Cheung was on bail pending trial.
- Kok Tse-Lun (郭子麟)(18): Hong Kong University student. He is Portuguese due to his Macau heritage, with his citizenship having been confirmed by the Portuguese cons-l general to Macau and Hong Kong Paulo Cunha Alves. Alves vowed to work with Chinese officials to defend Kok's human rights as protected by Portuguese citizenship, but China officials responded that as long as the individual has Hong Kong residency the individual will be treated as a Chinese citizen. Kok was arrested by the Hong Kong Police Force for rioting in the Polytechnic University siege in November 2019.
- Cheng Tsz-Ho (鄭子豪)(17): He was arrested by Hong Kong police for attempted arson and was on bail. His family went to the police station to report his missing on August 24 to no avail. On the following day, police provided the family with the Chinese Guangdong coastguard arrest order, two days before the official press release from Hong Kong government.
- Liu Sze-Man (廖子文)(17): Similar to Cheng Tsz-Ho in the same case, Liu was on bail for possession of Molotov in 2019 September.
- Hoang Lam Phuc (黃臨福)(16): Hoang has Vietnamese citizenship. He was arrested and detained and possibly abused by Hong Kong police, according to a Stand News report in October 2019. He was arrested for alleged arson and possession of three Motolov cocktails.
- Quinn Moon (喬映瑜): There is not much information available, but she is charged as the co-leader of the group.

== Background ==
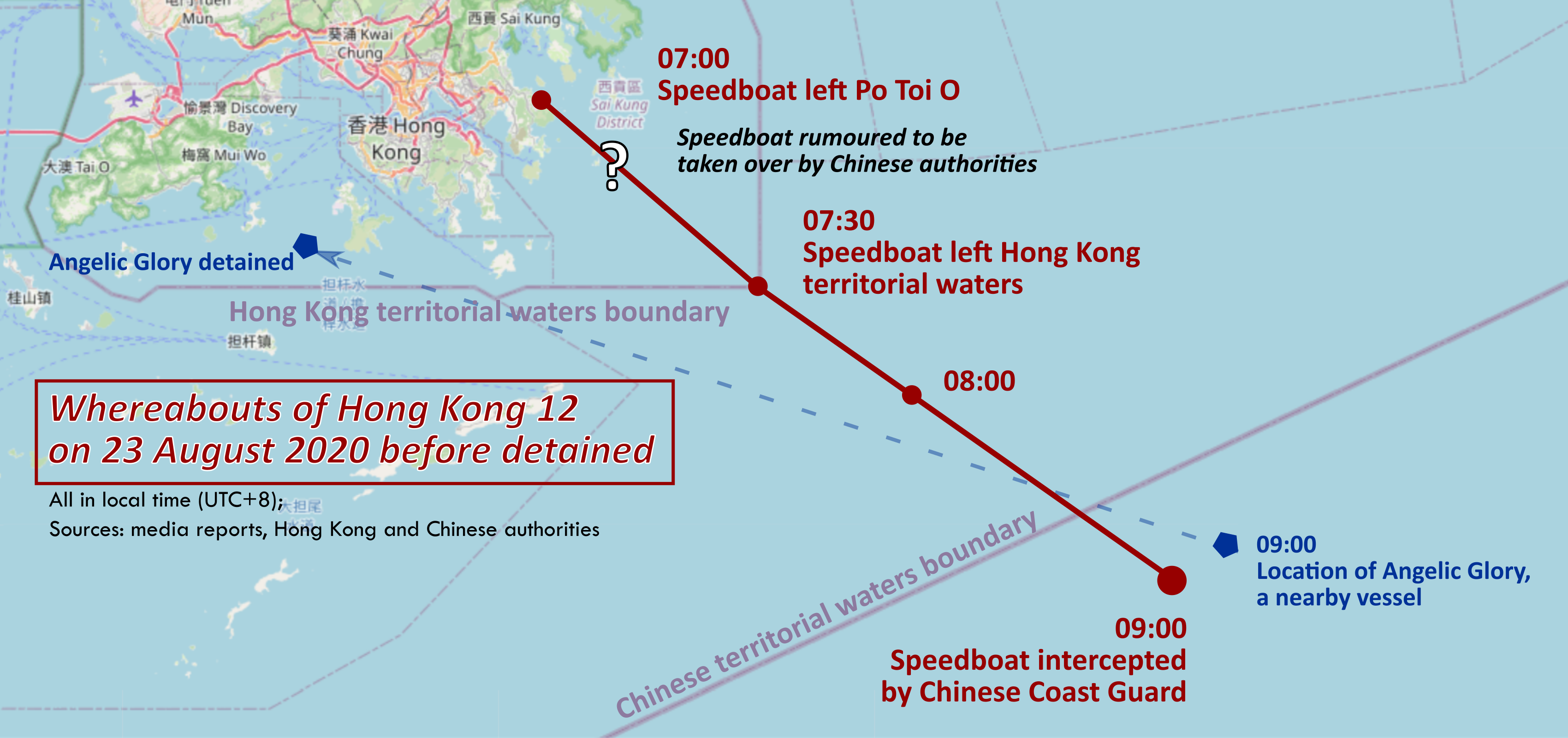
Map showing the path of the speedboat carrying the Hong Kong 12

Although the capture happened on August 23, no information was released to the public by the Chinese coastguards until August 26. The social media post on August 26 only mentioned the GPS location, the time of arrest, and the number of Hong Kong residents detained.

On August 28, details about the presumed detainees were released to the public by Wen Wei Po, citing "unnamed sources". According to Radio Free Asia, the arrestees were presumably charged with unlawful border crossing (into mainland China) and are currently in custody in mainland China. The media-published (not officially published by authorities) arrestee names include several Hong Kong pro-democracy activists, some of whom were earlier charged with protest-related crimes by the Hong Kong Police, and one under the new national security law.

According to state-affiliated newspapers, the 12 individuals set out at around 7am on August 23 from a dock located in eastern Hong Kong's Sai Kung. It is reported that they originally planned to reach Taiwan-controlled Pratas, also known as Dongsha Island, then change ship to reach Pingtung County. They were stopped and captured at around 9am at alleged GPS location (21°54'00''N, 114°53'00''E ), a location, if factually stated by Chinese authorities, that is not owned by China, but within its contiguous zone.

== Responses ==
=== Hong Kong and China Government responses ===
==== August 27–28, 2020 ====
Hong Kong Police denied any cooperation with Chinese authorities in the arrest.

The Hong Kong Security Bureau confirmed having received information relating to the detainees from the Chinese government. The bureau promised to assist family members and detainees.

In Guangdong, the province of China where the coastguards were based, the public safety division and a spokesman of the provincial authorities declined to provide more details.

==== September 1 ====
Chief Executive Carrie Lam said in a press conference that the Hong Kong government would do its part to protect Hong Kong citizens, but if illegal activities occurred in another judiciary region, Hong Kong could not intervene.

==== September 4 ====
The human rights lawyers Lu Siwei and Ren Quanniu, who had been appointed by the detainee's family members, were denied meeting access. Both of them reported that Chinese officials had attempted to dissuade them from pursuing the case.

==== September 13 ====
After the detainees' family press conference from the day before, in which they had pleaded for intervention by the Hong Kong government and possible extradition, Yantian detention center officially confirmed, for the first time, that the 12 detainees were indeed located in Yantian. Meanwhile, Chinese foreign ministry spokeswoman Hua Chunying publicly stated on Twitter that the 12 detainees were criminals trying to "separate Hong Kong from China", a more serious allegation than the "illegal border crossing", and a crime punishable under the Hong Kong national security law. The Hong Kong government reaffirmed its stance not to interfere with China's jurisdiction, claiming that the relevant crime "falls within the jurisdiction of the mainland and the special administrative region government respects and will not interfere with law enforcement actions."

==== September 19 ====
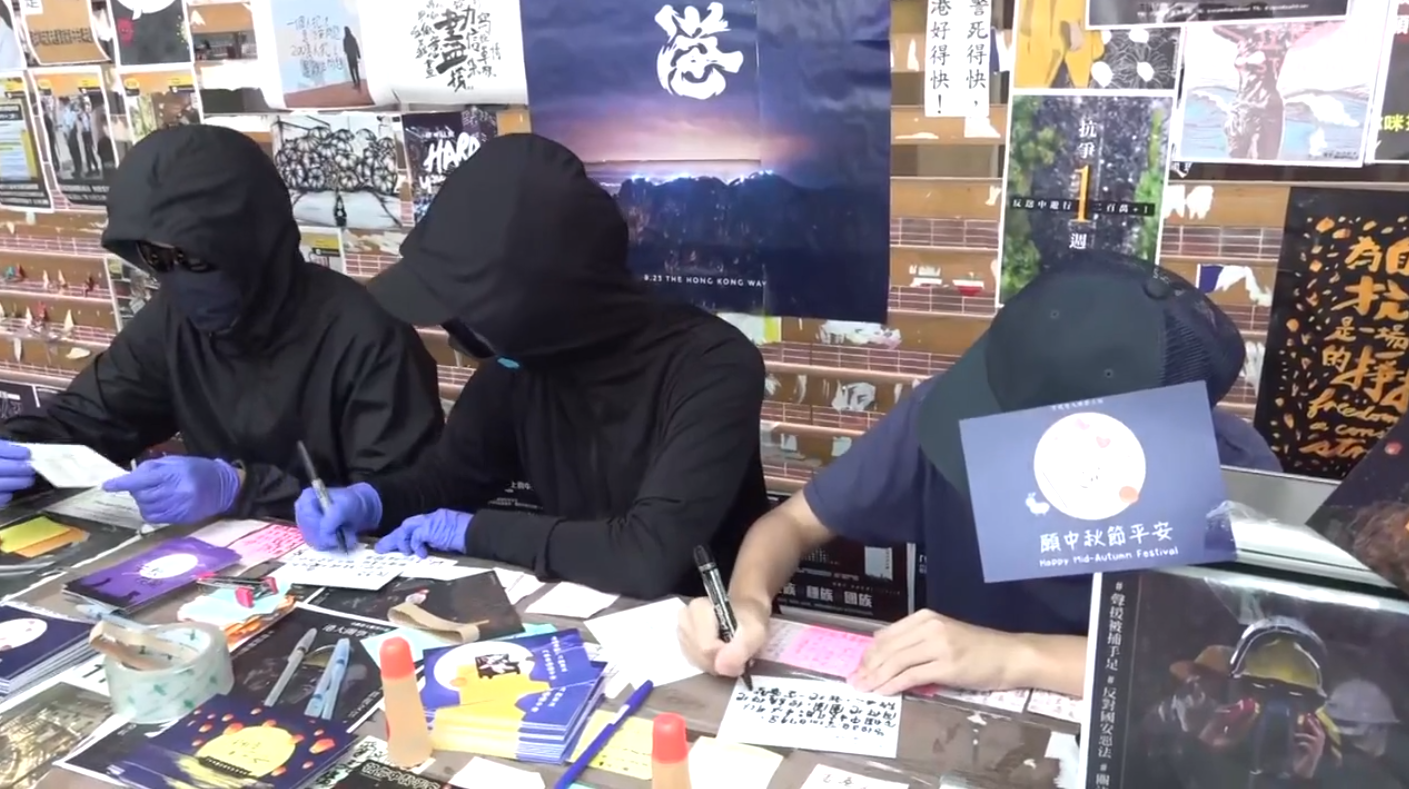
University of Hong Kong students awareness booth on campus on September 22, 2020

Secretary of Security John Lee acknowledged in a TVB interview that Hong Kong authorities had only been informed of the capture five days after and claimed that all 12 detainees were in good health. He further claimed that the detainees had already chosen their lawyers provided by China. Separately on a radio interview, Chief Secretary Matthew Cheung said that "Hong Kong’s Immigration Department and the Hong Kong Economic and Trade Office in Guangdong had communicated with the families 80 times since the arrests" but claimed that their hands were tied.

==== September 26 ====
The Hong Kong government issued a press release informing the public that the 12 detainees were now approved to be "arrested". Hong Kong Police also released a report with some data such as speed and coordinates of the boat to clarify the public's concern. According to criminal law in China, the maximum number of days of detention before sending them to the normal criminal court process – a certain form of incommunicado detention – or release on bail is 37 days.

==== September 30 ====
At the end of the 37-day legal limit for detention without further action, two of the 12 were formally charged with organising smuggling, and the remaining 10 individuals were charged with "illegal border crossing".

==== October 10 ====
Hong Kong police arrested a group of nine people who allegedly had provided financial and other assistance to the detainees before their voyage and after their arrival in Taiwan.

==== October 12 ====
Hong Kong Chief Executive Carrie Lam made clear that she "no longer wish[es] to discuss matters related to these 12 individuals" when asked by a journalist in a press conference on that day about her effort to safeguard the 12 individuals as she was to visit Shenzhen.

==== October 23 ====
A request in the Legislative Council to put the 12 detainees on the next meeting agenda, and to have Security Secretary John Lee report on the situation of the detainees as well as the support given to them and their families was voted down by the pro-Beijing majority.

==== October 28 ====
Activists familiar with the matter told reporters in a group chat that at least five family-appointed lawyers had received verbal warnings from various levels of Chinese justice bureaus to drop the work for their clients. Prior to this, on October 22, five family-appointed lawyers had visited the detention centre but were again refused entry on the grounds that the detainees had already been assigned two lawyers; family-appointed lawyer Lu Siwei suspected that these might be government-appointed.

==== November 20 ====
It was reported that seven out of the 12 detainees had written letters to their families, with the earliest dated October 13. There were suspicions that the handwritten letters, which stressed that the detainees were treated well, had been dictated by authorities.

==== November 27 ====
Police in the Yantian district of Shenzhen said in a posting on Weibo that they had completed their investigation into the case of the 12 detainees and that they would be sent to the Yantian District People's Procuratorate for "examination and prosecution". There has not been a visit granted since the capture.

==== December 16 ====
The Chinese government released the names of the now-confirmed detainees' names along with the charges the government was pressing. It said that the two underage detainees' trials would not be open to the public.

==== December 25 ====
Chinese government officials advised the family members that trials would begin three days later, on December 28.

==== December 28 ====
At the trial of 10 of the 12 detainees, staff maintained that it was open to the public but immediately followed this with the advice that the gallery was full. On these grounds, representatives from the United States (which had applied for an audit in accordance with established procedures), the United Kingdom, Canada, France, Germany, Portugal, Australia and the Netherlands were denied access to the hearing. Eight of the ten defendants of age were sentenced to seven months of prison terms for illegal border crossing. The two oldest detainees, Quinn Moon and Tang Kai-yin were sentenced to terms of two and three years, respectively.

==== December 30 ====
Two defendants aged 17 and 18 years were returned to Hong Kong by mainland authorities. The Yantian People's district court said that they had admitted wrongdoing, and that it would not persecute them.

==== Aftermath ====
The eight activists of age were returned to Hong Kong police on March 22 and charged by local courts. It was announced on March 24 that security law charges had been laid against Andy Li. The Apple Daily reported on March 28 that according to its sources, Li had been transferred to solitary confinement at a psychiatric hospital. On March 30, a lawyer representing Li appeared in West Kowloon Magistrates' Courts, with Li absent as he was still in quarantine isolation. An associate of the lawyer confirmed that they had met Li, but did not disclose information on Li's whereabouts. The family asserted that they had no knowledge of the lawyer.

On April 5, 2021, after completing a two-week quarantine period in relation to the COVID-19 pandemic, five of the activists who had been handed back by mainland authorities appeared in a court in Sha Tin over local charges in relation to the 2019–2020 Hong Kong protests. They did not apply for bail and were to appear again in court the following month.

On September 2, 2021, eight of the activists, including the two who had been transferred to Hong Kong on December, appeared in court on charges of trying to pervert the course of justice. It was reported that one of them intended to plead guilty. Six of them pleaded guilty in relation to the same charge in July 2022.

After completing her two-year jail term in mainland China, Quinn Moon returned to Hong Kong on August 22, 2022; that same month, she was charged by Hong Kong authorities with perverting the course of justice through her escape attempt, and with possession of dangerous drugs, as 2.98 grams of cannabis had been found in her possession on January 14, 2020. She told the court in June 2023 that she would plead guilty to charges of making explosives, possessing explosives and perverting the course of justice. Tang Kai-yin returned to Hong Kong on August 22, 2023 after completing a three-year jail sentence, where he was handed over to local police. As part of a plea deal with the prosecution, on January 22, 2024 Tang pleaded guilty to possessing "anything with intent to destroy or damage property", specifically material to make petrol bombs with four others in September 2019, after having originally been charged with conspiracy to commit arson with intent to endanger life. Citing case details unveiled in court, local media reported that the explosives had been intended to attack a procession on October 1. In April 2024, Tang Kai-yin, who upon his return to Hong Kong had pleaded guilty to the charges of possessing materials that could be used to make petrol bombs and perverting the course of justice, was jailed for three years and 10 months.

=== Presumed detainees' families' responses ===
==== September 12 ====
Initially limited information from Chinese authorities prompted six of the 12 families to hold a joint press conference with the help of politicians Owen Chow, Eddie Chu, and James To. The families denounced the Hong Kong government's reluctant approach to assist and the government's refusal to meet with the families. As they sought international support to put pressure on China to follow international human rights protocols, they also asked the Hong Kong government to help negotiate their demands with the Chinese government. The four demands include allowing prescribed medications to be delivered and safely administered to the detainees, allowing phone calls of detainees with families, declining "state-mandated lawyers" assigned by Chinese government, and releasing these individuals to Hong Kong for a fair trial.

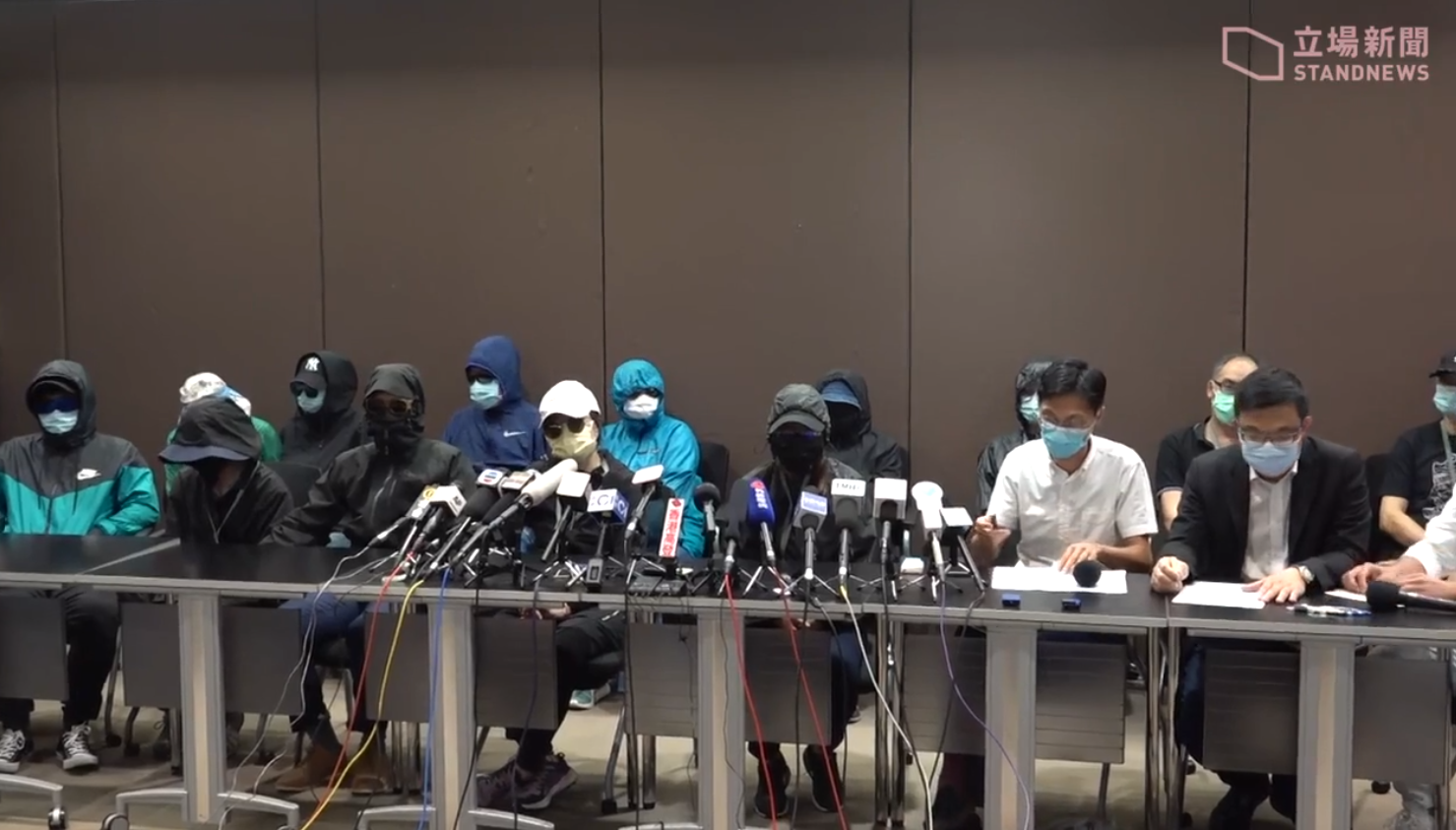
First press conference held by families on September 12, 2020.

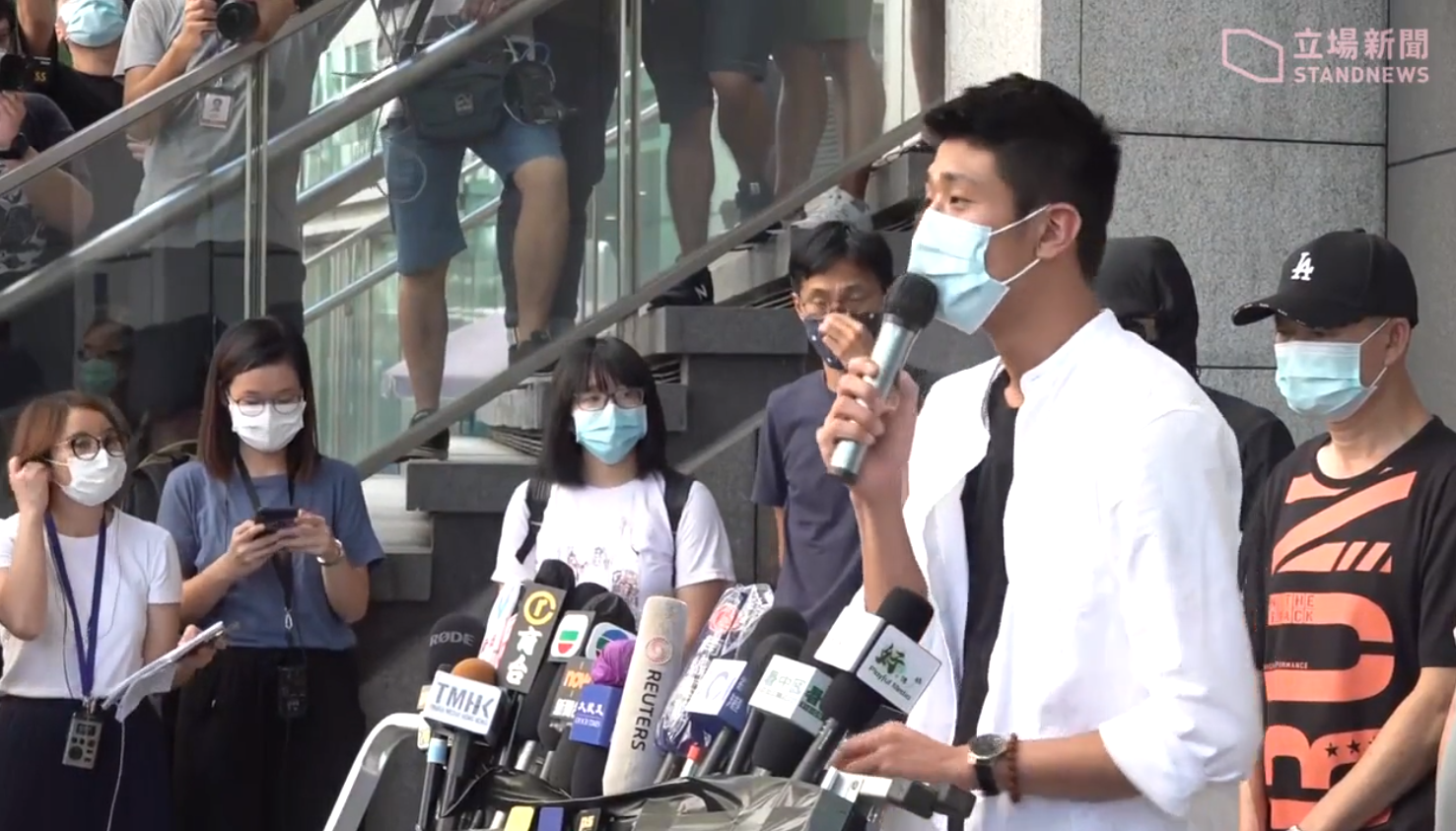
Localist activist Owen Chow speaking in the second press conference on September 20, 2020.

==== September 20 ====
Families of the detainees continued to accuse the Hong Kong government, as it had "only shirked responsibility and confused the public with mere excuses". Family members asked the Hong Kong government to provide clear and accurate evidence of the maritime radar location and a recent photo of each detainee in order to let the captured know the families had appointed lawyers for them.

==== September 30 ====
Four family members along with several lawmakers went to the Hong Kong Liaison Office to petition. They accused the Hong Kong government of lying to the public, and asked that Security Secretary and Chief Secretary for Administration to allow meetings of the detainees with the families. To date, six lawyers have withdrawn from the case, 13 lawyers were pressured by the Chinese government not to take up the case, and 10 other lawyers were denied access to the detainees.

==== October 22 ====
Detainees' families continue to try to reach officials at the Yantian detention centre. Authorities refused meeting requests and claimed that all detainees have been appointed lawyers. Family lawyers further raised concerns about the legality of "state-appointed" lawyers to the only underage detainee.

==== November 21 ====
Family members and supporters released blue and white balloons written with the detainees' names and well-wishing messages at a peak on Kat O island, an island still within Hong Kong territory but close to Shenzhen's Yantian detention center. Hong Kong coastguards later arrived and alleged violation of the social gathering ordinance.

==== December 12 ====
After the alleged letters penned by the detainees arrived to their Hong Kong families, today the families held a press conference, claiming that they received phone calls from self-proclaimed "lawyers of the detainees". The Mandarin-speaking callers allegedly asked family members for details of the detainees' Hong Kong arrest and charges and, not to mention, the names of the "government-appointed lawyers".

=== Hong Kong residents' responses ===
==== September ====
On September 2, a Sha Tin District representative initiated a Google Form petition pleading that the Hong Kong government make sure the 12 detainees be released and returned to Hong Kong, citing precarious human rights practices by the Chinese authorities and the scarcity of information.

Netizens started a hashtag "#save12hkyouths", hoping to spread the awareness of the "black-box operation" of the Chinese government to social media.

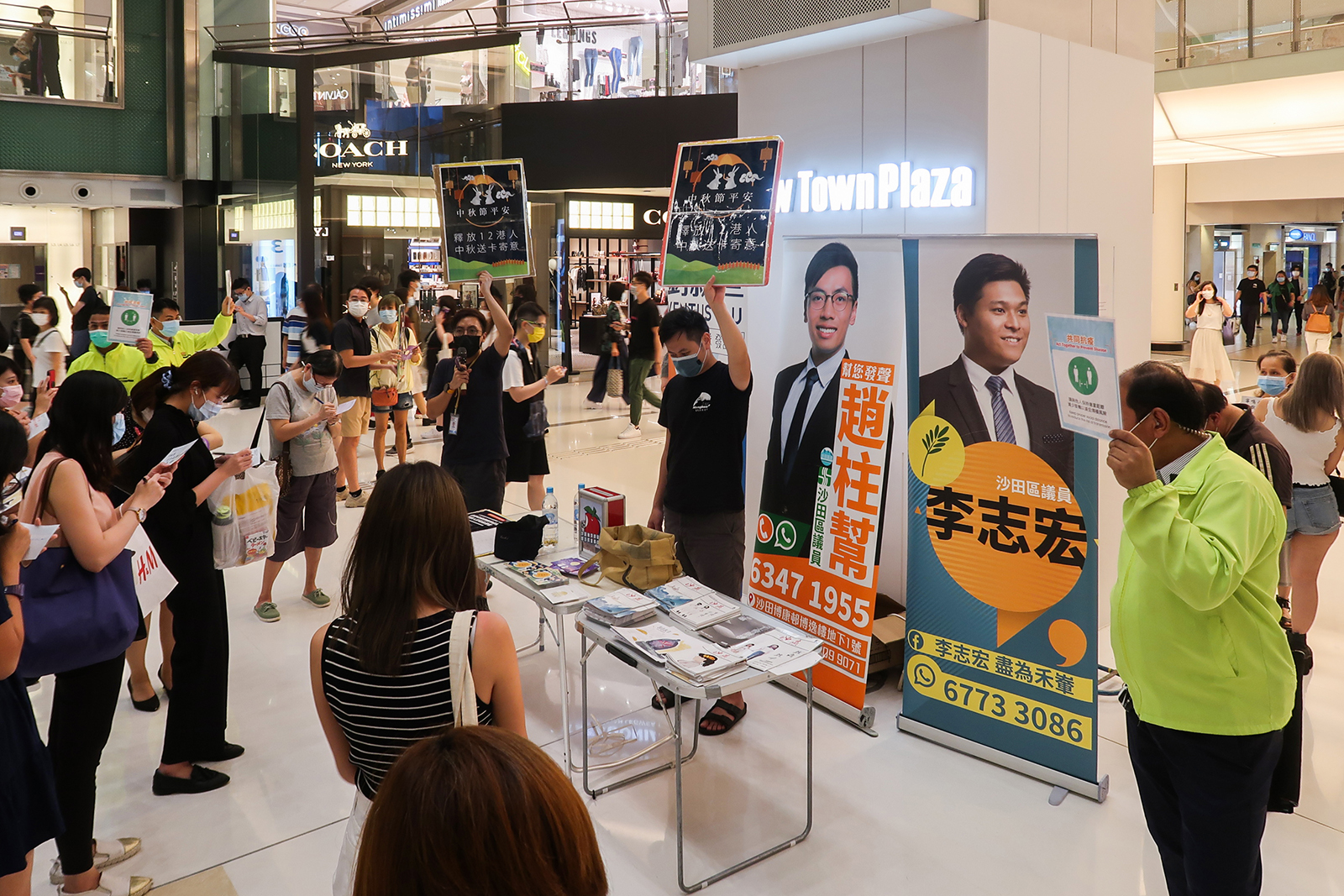
Sha Tin district representative street booth on September 23, 2020, in support of the 12 detainees

Throughout the month of September, over a hundred Hong Kong district representatives set up street booths to raise awareness of these 12 individuals. Police often interfered.

Beginning September 22, students from the University of Hong Kong set up booths as they returned to the campus to bring awareness of the incident and collect well-wishes postcards. On October 1, as Hong Kong residents celebrated the annual mid-autumn festival, district representatives and various pro-democracy group set up street booths to voice their support of the detainees.

==== October ====
On October 2, a few Hong Kong supporters hiked for two hours to reach the top of Lion Rock, a symbolic Hong Kong mountain top, to showcase a "Save 12" neon-light sign.

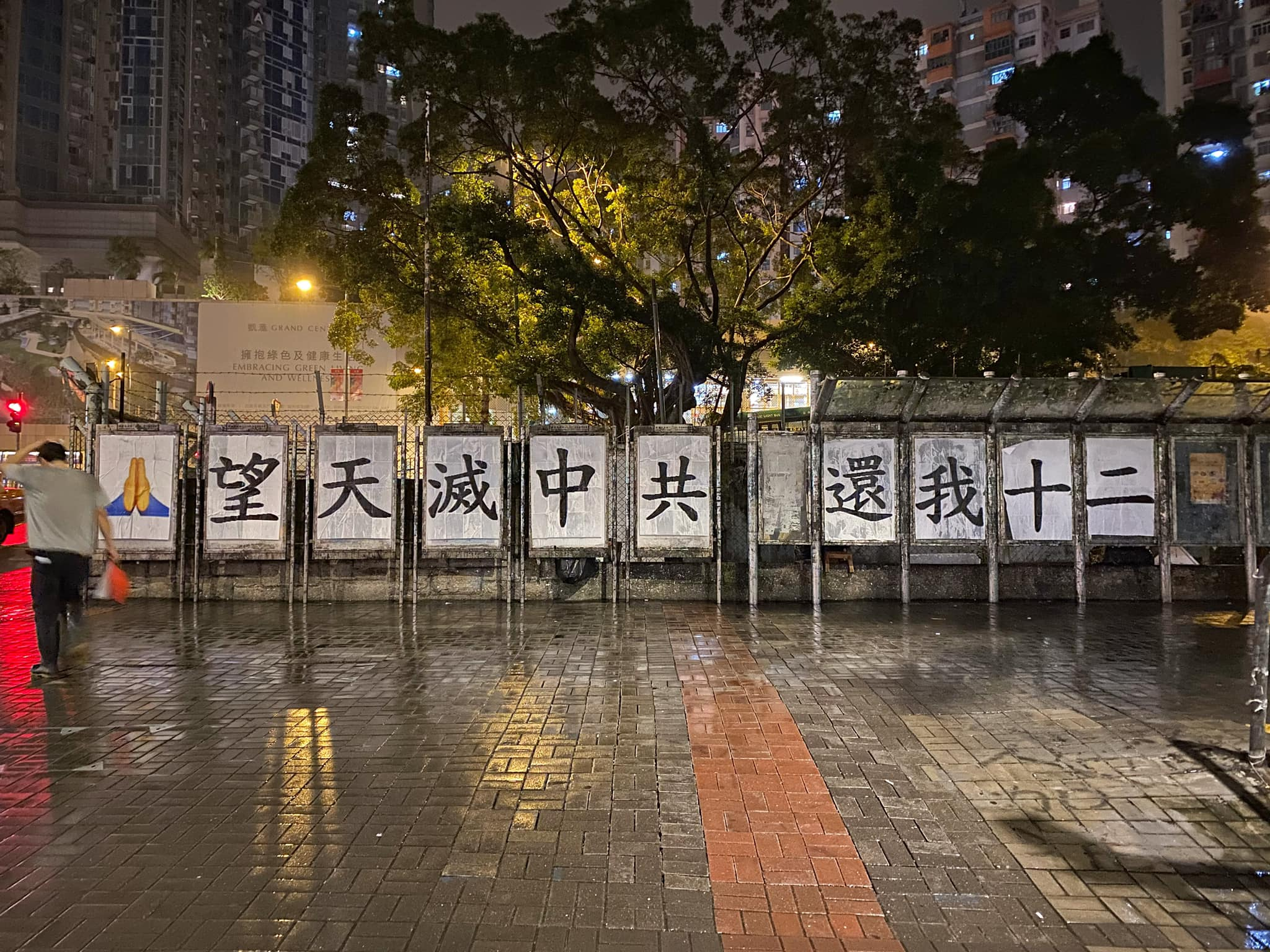
This message 「望天滅中共還我十二」roughly translates to "Wishing for the heavens to annihilate the CCP, return our 12." was put out on October 13, 2020, in Kwun Tong.

On October 7, a vertical protest banner was unfurled on Kowloon Peak with the phrase "Unlawful Detainment; Release the 12" (「禁錮無理 釋放12子」).

A virtual rally by the "Save 12 Hong Kong Youths" concern group on October 25, livestreamed over Facebook, had almost 320,000 viewers joining. In his opening statement, activist Owen Chow suggested that Hong Kong authorities had conspired with their mainland counterparts to send Hongkongers to China. Previously on October 6, he city's Chief Executive Carrie Lam had ruled out any involvement by Hong Kong police in the interception.

Hong Kong district councillors and activist group Student Politicism have been holding street booths to raise awareness of the detainment. On October 27 police fined and ticketed several people at a street booth in Tsuen Wan, and on December 2 police arrested the same group at a booth in Mong Kok, citing "disorderly conduct".

In addition to holding street booths in the city, on October 27 it was also discovered that the words "FREE HK SAVE 12" were painted on the helicopter pad of Tai Mei Tuk country park.

==== November ====
At the one-year anniversary memorial of Siege of the Hong Kong Polytechnic University and the Siege of the Chinese University of Hong Kong, Hong Kong citizens put together a "SAVE 12" sign using locks on a wired fence outside of Polytechnic University. The locks have the 12 presumed detainees' names and messages such as "send them home" written on them.

During Chinese University's graduation ceremony graduates displayed a giant "SAVE 12 HK" black banner on the school building. They also hold cards with "SAVE12" and released black balloons with the words "SAVE12".

On November 30, the 100th day of detention, the League of Social Democrats (LSD) held street booths and petitions for two days in Causeway Bay. They also marched to the Central post office with their "SAVE 12" signage and postcards written by citizens. and Amnesty International also posted a statement urging China to release the 12 detainees. At night, Hong Kong citizens raised a neon-light "SAVE 12" sign on Lion Rock to show their support and continue to bring awareness.

==== December ====
On December 10, also known as International Human Rights Day, the chairman and vice-chairman of LSD protested outside of the Chinese Liaison Office, chanting "Save 12" and holding signs.

Hong Kong activists and supporters in London held a "one-year commemoration" of the university sieges on December 12. Many participants held "SAVE12HKYOUTHS" signs and folded origami boats to bring awareness of the detainment.

=== International responses ===
==== Portugal ====
The Portuguese consul-general for Macao and Hong Kong confirmed that one of the detainees, surnamed Kok, has Portuguese citizenship from his Macau ties, but the consulate stressed that it would only provide humanitarian assistance and not legal support to Kok.

Isabel Santos, a Portuguese politician who has been a member of the European Parliament, had requested the Chinese government for a visit to Kok.

==== United States ====
On September 12, US Secretary of State Mike Pompeo expressed "grave concern" about the situation and questioned "Chief Executive Lam’s stated commitment to protecting the rights of Hong Kong residents, and call on authorities to ensure due process". The next day U.S. State Department spokeswoman Morgan Ortagus tweeted the arrests were “another example of the deterioration of human rights in Hong Kong”, and urged China to “ensure due process”.

On October 13, Mike Pompeo defended the 12 Hong Kong residents in the virtual award speech, saying that they had "committed no crime" but were detained by China while allegedly fleeing Hong Kong for Taiwan. Hong Kong pro-democracy activist Nathan Law praised IRI for its continued support for Hong Kong's political freedom and called upon all freedom-loving countries to resist Chinese authoritarianism.

==== Taiwan ====
While many protesters who had fled Hong Kong for Taiwan since the LegCo storming in July 2019 later returned to Hong Kong, activists have put the number of those remaining in Taiwan as of June 2020 at over 200. When asked by media about Hong Kong residents seeking asylum in Taiwan by boat, Taiwan Premier Su Tseng-chang stated that "the government cared deeply about people from Hong Kong," but in regard to "the help to Hong Kong people, certain individual cases we cannot reveal". Mainland Affairs Council also discouraged any means to enter Taiwan by illegal methods.

==== United Kingdom ====
Among the 12 presumed detainees, four of them hold British National Overseas (BNO) passports. On October 13, the British Parliament held a discussion on Hong Kong. Parliament member Nigel Adams stated that while the UK government had already reached out to Chinese government regarding the rights of these four individuals, the Chinese government "absolutely would not grant UK consular access" because China does not recognise dual citizenship and BNOs-entitled consular assistance is not granted in Hong Kong, Macau or mainland China. On October 21, over 60 Parliament members urged Foreign Minister Dominic Raab to make it a "diplomatic priority" to pressure Carrie Lam and his Beijing counterpart to release the 12 activists. Raab responded several days later that UK officials have reached out to the BNO-owned families and has been pressing the issue on several occasions already and would continue to press for transparency.

==== Canada ====
On November 16, Canadian Foreign Affairs Minister François-Philippe Champagne received an open letter penned by 25 Canadian cross-party parliamentarians urging the Canadian official to "call on Hong Kong Chief Executive Carrie Lam and [Champagne's] counterpart in Beijing to immediately ensure the return of the twelve activists to Hong Kong, to guarantee that they have legal representation of their choosing and contact with their families, and to ensure the young people access to necessary prescribed medication."

==== Global ====
On December 2, the 100th day of the capture with zero contact from the detainees, over 150 parliamentarians from 18 different countries jointly called on Hong Kong Chief Executive Carrie Lam to intercede and "ensure that they are guaranteed justice”. The signatories, according to the organisation Hong Kong Watch, include parliamentarians from "Australia, Canada, Denmark, EU, France, Germany, Ireland, Italy, Japan, Lithuania, Myanmar, Netherlands, New Zealand, Nigeria, Norway, Sweden, Uganda, UK, and USA".

==== Netizens ====
===== October =====
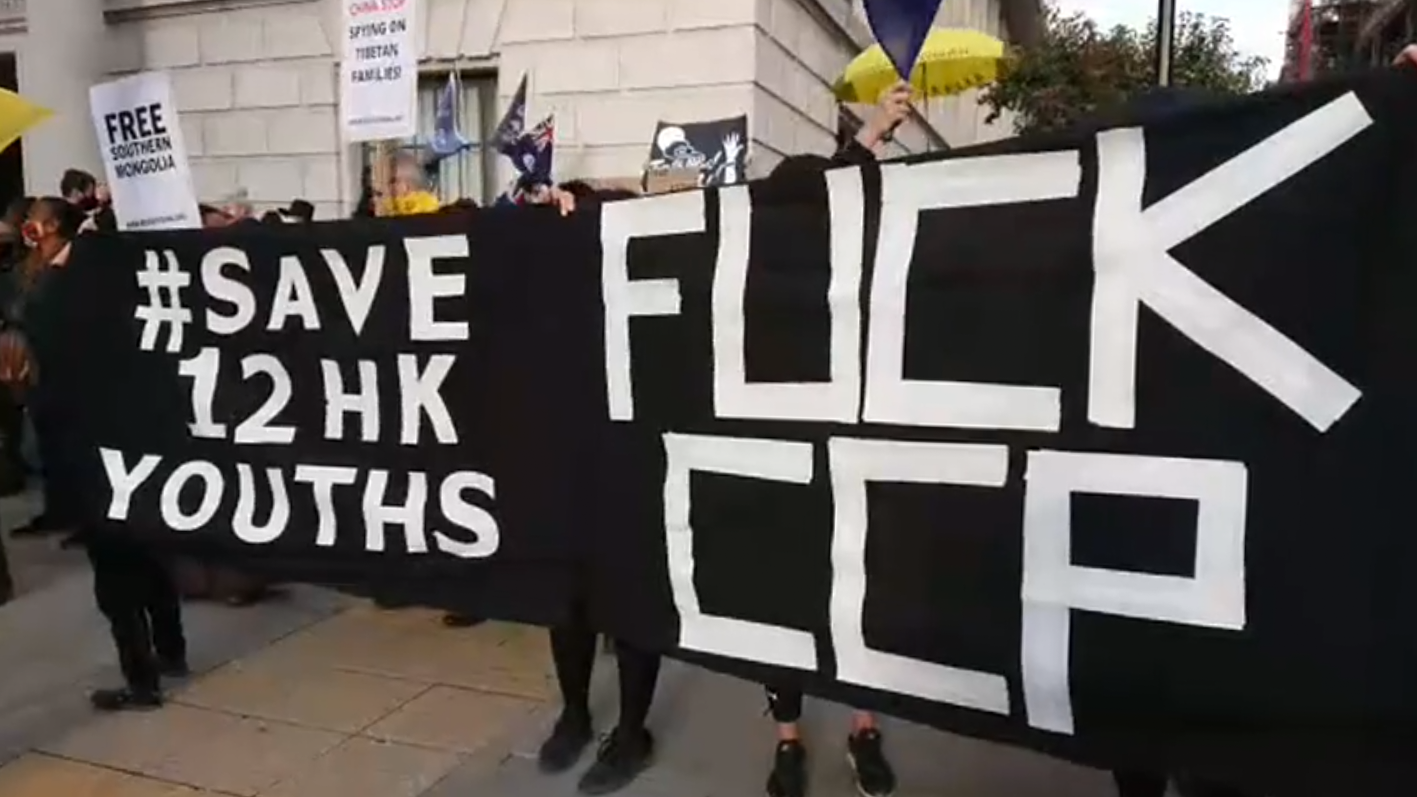
Protests in front of Chinese embassy in London on China's national holiday on October 1, 2020.

On October 1, 2020, groups of protesters appeared in front of London's Chinese embassy with signs demanding the release of the 12 detainees.

Since early October, various international figures such as Swedish climate activist Greta Thunberg and artist, cartoonist and rights activist Badiucao have held up "#Save12HKYouth" in social media to help bring awareness to the 12 detainees. The campaign was initiated by human rights organization Hong Kong Watch, and it termed this detainment as the "watershed case for Hong Kong" that will influence if extraditing pro-democracy activists to stand trial in the mainland would become a common occurrence.

Over the weekend from October 23–25, over 30 cities around the world had support events bringing awareness of these 12 detainees to the citizens and their local governments.

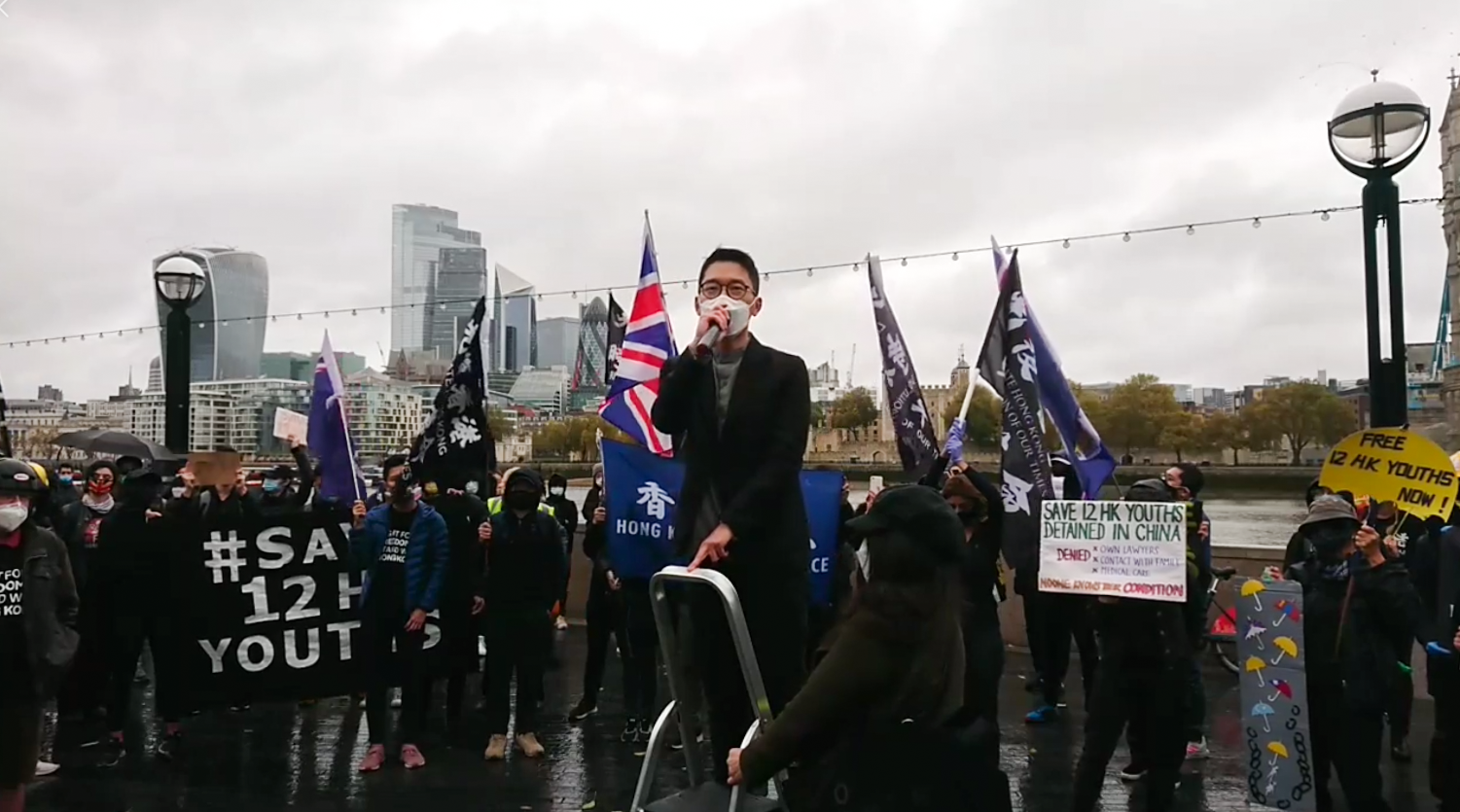
Pro-democracy activist Nathan Law speaking at the London solidarity event on October 24, 2020.

== Controversies ==
=== Exact capture location unverified ===
Although Chinese coastguards released the GPS coordinates of the capture, there is no other substantial evidence to support its claim that the location was outside Chinese borders. Although Hong Kong Police stated that there was no evidence to substantiate that Chinese coastguards had entered Hong Kong waters, some Hong Kong fishermen reached out to Hong Kong lawyers said they witnessed the capture had been within Hong Kong.

=== Extended and delayed trial date ===
Whereas Hong Kong has had an internationally respected judiciary system, China has had its human rights violations documented internationally. The treatment of these 12 detainees was a grave concern for many. Even as the 12 had now been formally arrested after over 30 days of detention, there was no clear indication when the prosecution and trial would take place.

=== Allegations about role of Hong Kong Police in the arrest ===
On September 20, two families' members revealed to news reporters that they had separately gone to the police stations to report their missing sons on August 24, one day after the capture. While the missing person reports were not accepted by police, one policeman showed a record of the missing person's cellphone record to the family member, raising questions on how the records were obtained two days after the capture but three days before the news broke. The other family member was told that the son was now detained in Yantian, days before the detention location was reported by media.

On October 5, it was reported that the Hong Kong Government Flying Service (GFS) had allegedly tracked the boat before it was captured. According to data from the flight tracking website FlightAware, an aircraft belonging to the GFS took off from the Hong Kong International Airport at 4:19 am on August 23 and circled around Sai Kung until 7:00 am, which was when the 12 detainees allegedly departed from Sai Kung. The aircraft then travelled towards southeastern Hong Kong waters at 7:30 am, which also coincides with the time the 12 detainees allegedly crossed the southeastern Hong Kong boundary. The legislator Jeremy Tam, who has also worked as a pilot, pointed out that it was very likely that the GFS aircraft was conducting surveillance on the boat and that the Hong Kong government may have provided information on the speedboat to mainland law enforcement. Chief Executive Carrie Lam had ruled out any involvement by Hong Kong police in the interception of the twelve, stating that she believed "a tiny fraction of people" had not given up on "any opportunity to smear the Hong Kong government, to attack the police, to fabricate this and that".

== Trial ==
In August 2021, Andy Li pleaded guilty in the High Court to conspiring to collude with Next Digital founder Jimmy Lai, his aide Mark Simon, and foreign forces. The prosecution said Li helped fundraise HK$24.4 million and received over HK$5 million from Lai and Simon. One of their goals was to urge other countries through newspaper articles to sanction the mainland and the Hong Kong SAR.

== See also ==
- 2019–2020 Hong Kong protests
- Causeway Bay Books disappearances
- Hong Kong 47
