= Student Politicism =

Hong Kong student political group

- 賢學思政
- Founded: 26 May 2020
- Dissolved: 24 September 2021
- Secretary General: Chan Chi-sum
- Leader: Wong Yat-chin
- Spokesperson: Wong Yuen-lam
- Website: Student Politicism on Facebook; Student Politicism on Instagram

Student Politicism (Chinese: 賢學思政) was a student political group in Hong Kong. Founded on 26 May 2020, the group was one of only few pro-democracy organisations still existing in Hong Kong as of September 2021, before it was dissolved on 24 September 2021 after core members were charged under the National Security Law.

== History ==
=== "To test the red line" ===
Student Politicism was founded on 26 May 2020, just days after the Chinese Government announced the start of enacting the National Security Law. The group name "賢學思政" was taken from their slogan "賢學啟志 衛民思政", meaning "venerate studying to enlighten mind; defend citizens to ponder politics." Wong Yat-chin, the convenor of the group, once described the value of the group is "to test the red line of the regime", and to “bring hope to people”.

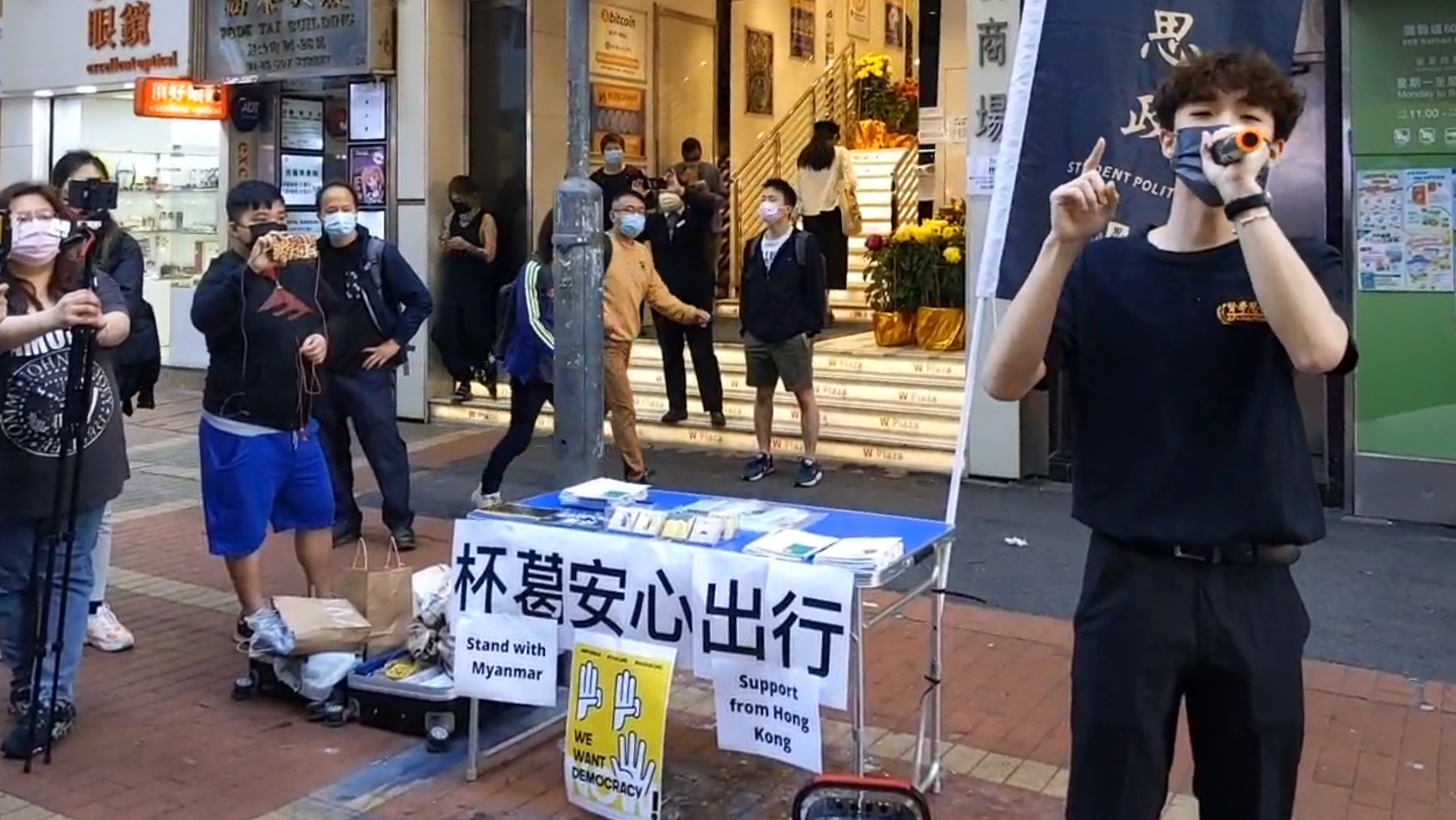
Booth of Student Politicism in February 2021 with Wong Yat-chin (right)

Student Politicism voiced support on the democratization of Hong Kong, aimed to raise the public awareness on education, local culture, and various social issues, including the detainment of 12 Hongkongers in Chinese water, while supporting the jailed protesters by collecting supplies for prisoners and letters of support. It gained prominence after frequently setting up street booths to advocate their ideas.

Following the imposition of National Security Law in Hong Kong by China, the pro-democracy protests and movements lost the momentum. Student Politicism became one of the few remaining local pro-democracy organisations that continued to run street booths. The core members were repeatedly arrested on suspicion of illegal assembly or sedition, and were warned of possibly breaching the National Security Law by the police.

=== Disbandment and aftermath ===
On 20 September 2021, Wong Yat-chin, secretary-general Chan Chi-sum, and former spokeswoman Jessica Chu – who reportedly had left the group – were arrested under the National Security Law. Spokeswoman Alice Wong Yuen-lam was arrested on 22 September after she had reportedly turned herself in at a police station. The police alleged them to have incited hatred against Hong Kong's government by urging people not to use the LeaveHomeSafe COVID tracking app and by other means, in addition to calling to prepare for another "revolution" through martial arts training. Four were taken to court later, charged for inciting subversion, and all denied bail on 21 and 23 September 2021. On 15 October 2021, Chu was granted bail while the other three core members had their bail applications again rejected.

On 24 September, days after the crackdown, the group announced its disbandment, citing the "lack of foreseeable space" to continue its mission.

On 28 July 2022, Wong Yat-chin, Chan Chi-sum, Jessica Chu, and Alice Wong all pleaded guilty to conspiring to incite subversion. Chu applied for her bail to be revoked. The four returned to court on 24 September, on which day the prosecution questioned the credibility of the mitigation submission of Wong Yat-chin, citing a social media post by him.

On 23 October 2022, Wong Yat-chin, Chan and Chu were sentenced to 30 to 36 months in prison, while Wong Yuen-lam was sent to a training centre.
