= Gordon Ng =

Hong Kong activist

- 吳政亨
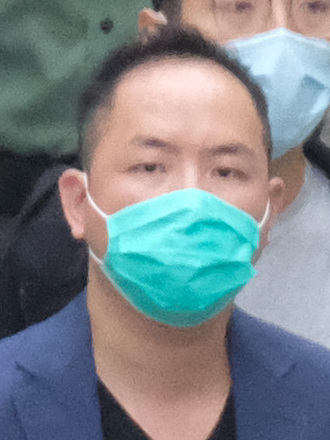
- Ng, jailed, in 2021
- Born: 9 September 1978 (age 47)
- Other name: Lee Bak Lou
- Known for: Hong Kong 47
- Criminal charges: Conspiracy to commit subversion
- Website: Gordon Ng on LIHKG; Gordon Ng on Facebook; Gordon Ng on Instagram

Gordon Ng Ching-hang (Chinese: 吳政亨, born 9 September 1978), also known under the pseudonym Lee Bak Lou (Chinese: 李伯盧; Jyutping: Lei5 Baak3 Lou4), is a Hong Kong pro-democracy activist. Ng, the only nonpartisan defendant of the Hong Kong 47, is charged and now detained under the national security law for conspiracy to commit subversion.

== Career ==
After graduating from an Australian university, Ng worked in investment companies between 2009 and 2016, much of his work being related to hedge funds.

In 2016, he became a volunteer of ThunderGo, a strategic electoral plan proposed by legal scholar Benny Tai.

Ng was known in LIHKG, one of Hong Kong's most popular online forums, as "Lee Bak Lou", a phonetic translation of "liberal". Without any prior electoral and political experiences, he initiated the petition "Say No to Primary Dodgers" (Chinese: 三投三不投; lit. 'Three vote', 'three don't vote') (Note: Vote in primaries, vote in general election, vote for primaries' winners; don't vote for those not supporting, joining, or obeying the primaries) in the run-up of the 2020 pro-democracy primaries, hoping the pro-democracy camp would unite and secure a majority in the Legislative Council after the legislative election. Helping Tai to formulate the plan for the primaries, Ng also published a front-page advertisement on Apple Daily and wrote to politicians to gather support for his initiative.

With the conclusion of the primaries, Ng continued his political activism under the name of "Legco Petition".

== Arrest ==
Ng was arrested on 6 January 2021 by the national security police for organising the primaries on suspicion of "subversion of state power". Although released on police bail, he, along with 46 others which would collectively be known as Hong Kong 47, was re-arrested on 28 February, and charged with conspiracy to commit subversion of the state power. He has since been remanded in custody after his bail applications were turned down by court. Ng is also the only defendant reserving the 8-day bail review rights, and requesting a committal proceedings to review whether he could be transferred to High Court.

According to the Australian Government, Australian officials were repeatedly refused consular access to an Australian-Chinese dual national because Hong Kong no longer recognised dual citizenship. Local media later identified Ng as the person concerned.

Do I think I have committed a crime? I don't, I absolutely don't. Therefore, I have decided, not to plead guilty.
And for other uncertainties, as they are unescapable, I can only courageously face them.
I am ready to face the largest battle of my life in the battlefield of court.
I fear, but I don't retreat.

— Gordon Ng, The decision of pleading guilty or not

Ng is the only organiser not pleading guilty to the charge, which carries the maximum penalty of life imprisonment for "principal offender" or those committing "an offence of a grave nature". Ng believed he could be locked up in prison for 20 years, citing multiple concerns and factors including the reaction from the Australian Government.

In the trial, Ng was accused by the prosecution to be a supporter of Tai and that his voting strategy "formed the backbone of the primary election" for making the primaries binding.

On 30 May 2024, Ng was found guilty of subversion in the primaries case, along with 13 other defendants.

== See also ==
- List of Chinese pro-democracy activists
