= Tommy Cheung (politician) =

Hong Kong activist

Tommy Cheung Sau-yin
- 張秀賢
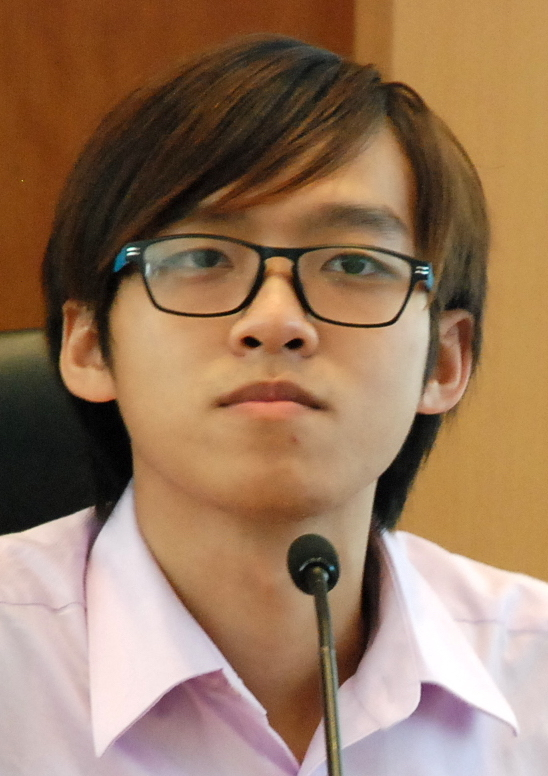
- Tommy Cheung in 2014.

President of the Student Union of the Chinese University of Hong Kong
- In office 1 March 2014 – 28 February 2015
- Preceded by: Eason Chung
- Succeeded by: Wong Ching-fung

Member of the Yuen Long District Council
- In office 1 January 2020 – 22 October 2021
- Preceded by: Wilson Wong

Personal details
- Born: 16 April 1994 (age 32) Hong Kong
- Education: Chinese University of Hong Kong

Tommy Cheung Sau-yin (Chinese: 張秀賢; born 16 April 1994) is a Hong Kong activist and a former Yuen Long District Councillor. He is the former spokesman of Scholarism, president of the Student Union of the Chinese University of Hong Kong and the standing committee of the Hong Kong Federation of Students (HKFS). In July 2024 he was declared bankrupt by High Court of Hong Kong.

== Biography ==
He was a core member of Scholarism which was formed in 2011 to launch campaigns against the proposed Moral and National Education which was seen as biased pro-Communist curriculum and became the spokesman of the group. The campaign successfully mobilised the thousands in protest and led to the turndown of the curriculum by the government in September 2012.

Cheung was later enrolled to the Chinese University of Hong Kong, studying Politics and Public Administration. He became the president of the Student Union in 2014 and the member of the Hong Kong Federation of Students (HKFS). He was actively involved in the massive Occupy protests in 2014 against the Beijing's decision on the framework of the 2017 Chief Executive election. He became one of the nine leading figures arrested in 2017 for initiating the illegal assembly.

He led the seven-member "Student United 2017" running in the Election Committee subsector elections in December 2016 on the capacity of the former member of the Chinese University's Senate but his candidacy was barred by the Returning Officer of the Electoral Affairs Commission because of his "insufficient connection" with the Higher Education subsector.

In the 2018 New Territories East by-election, Cheung announced his candidacy and joined the pro-democracy primary, running against Gary Fan of Neo Democrats and Kwok Wing-kin of the Labour Party.

Cheung was elected to public office for the first time during the 2019 Hong Kong District Council elections, winning a seat in Yuen Lung. He defeated incumbent Wilson Wong by 900 votes.

On 22 October 2021, Cheung decided to resign as district councillor ahead of oath-taking, for health reasons because he was diagnosed with liver tumor.

Cheung defected to the pro-Beijing camp after his resignation, and joined Basic Law Student Centre.

Educational offices
Preceded by Eason Chung	President of the Student Union of the Chinese University of Hong Kong; 2014–2015	Succeeded by Wong Ching-fung
Political offices
Preceded by Wong Wai-shun	Member of Yuen Long District Council; Representative for Yuen Lung; 2020–2021	Vacant
