= 2017 Hong Kong Chief Executive election =

Election in Hong Kong

- 26 March 2017

All 1,194 votes of the Election Committee 601 votes needed to win
- Opinion polls

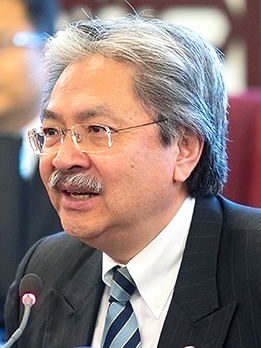

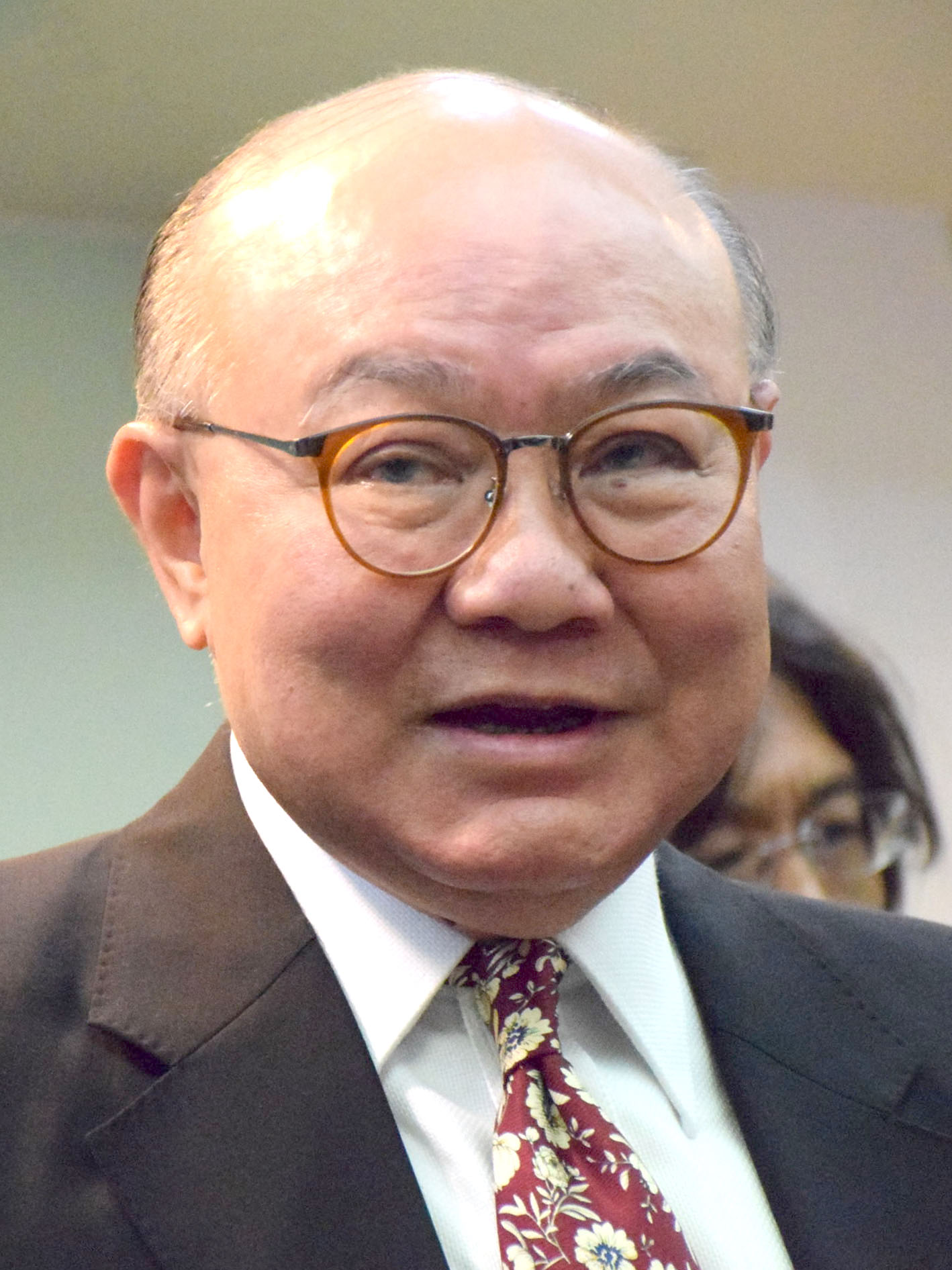
Nominee	Carrie Lam	John Tsang	Woo Kwok-hing
Party	Nonpartisan	Nonpartisan	Nonpartisan
Alliance	Pro-Beijing	Pro-Beijing	N/A
Electoral vote	777	365	21
Percentage	66.81%	31.38%	1.81%
Chief Executive before election
Leung Chun-ying
Nonpartisan
Elected Chief Executive
Carrie Lam
Nonpartisan

The 2017 Hong Kong Chief Executive election was held on 26 March 2017 for the 5th term of the Chief Executive of Hong Kong (CE), the highest office of the Hong Kong Special Administrative Region (HKSAR). It was the last Chief Executive election to feature multiple candidates. Former Chief Secretary for Administration Carrie Lam beat former Financial Secretary John Tsang and retired judge Woo Kwok-hing, receiving 777 votes from the 1,194-member Election Committee.

The two front-runners, Lam and Tsang, emerged after incumbent Chief Executive Leung Chun-ying surprisingly announced he would not run for a second term. Both resigned from their posts in the government. Despite leading in the polls, Tsang struggled to receive nominations from the pro-Beijing electors and had to rely heavily on pro-democrats. Lam, with the PRC's Liaison Office actively lobbying for her, attracted 580 nominations, almost half in the Election Committee and only 21 votes short of winning the final election, while Tsang and Woo received 165 and 180 nominations respectively, most of which came from the pro-democracy camp which consisted of about 320 members.

As a result, Lam received 777 electoral votes, beating Tsang's 365 and Woo's 21 votes, higher than Leung's 689 votes in the last election, becoming the first female Chief Executive.

== Background ==
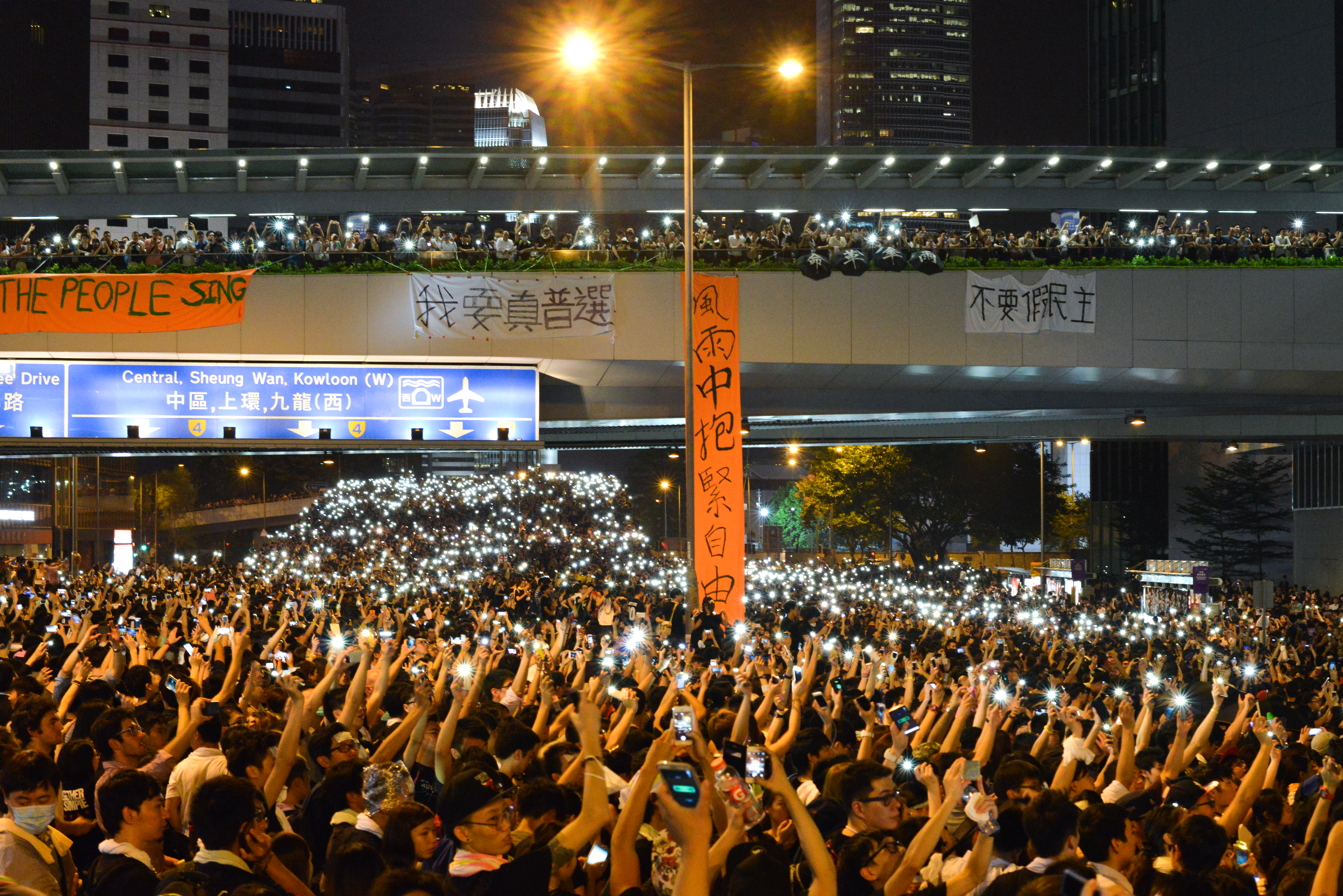
The 2014 sit-in protests calling for "genuine universal suffrage" were held in response to the NPCSC decision affecting the 2017 election.

The highest government office of Hong Kong, the Chief Executive, is selected by a 1,200-member Election Committee (EC) which is divided into various subsectors and dominated by pro-Beijing politicians and tycoons. Since the terms of Article 45 of the Basic Law of Hong Kong requiring "selection of the Chief Executive by universal suffrage upon nomination by a broadly representative nominating committee in accordance with democratic procedures" have not been implemented, the progress to universal suffrage has been the dominant issue in Hong Kong politics since the transfer of sovereignty in 1997.

In 2004, the National People's Congress Standing Committee (NPCSC) had ruled out universal suffrage in the 2012 Chief Executive election, but in 2007 ruled that the 2017 Chief Executive election "may be implemented by the method of universal suffrage". On 31 August 2014, however, the NPCSC imposed the nebulous condition that "the Chief Executive shall be a person who loves the country and loves Hong Kong" and that the process of selection of two or three candidates by an undemocratic nominating committee continue. The pan-democrats viewed the restrictive nominating process as a violation of international standards for free elections, as candidates unsupportive of the central government would likely be screened out. The "831 decision", as it was called, triggered a class boycott in Hong Kong which escalated into an unprecedented 79-day large-scale occupy movement, internationally known as the "Umbrella Revolution".

On 18 June 2015, the Legislative Council rejected the electoral reform proposal 28 votes to 8, with 33 principally pro-Beijing legislators absent in a whip failure. The selection method and procedure thus remained unchanged from that employed in 2012.

== Candidates ==
=== Nominees ===
Candidate	Born	Party	Most recent position	Campaign	Nominations received
Carrie Lam 林鄭月娥	13 May 1957 (age 59)	Nonpartisan (Pro-Beijing)	Chief Secretary for Administration (2012–2017)	Announced: 16 January 2017; Nominated: 28 February 2017	580 / 1,194 (49%)
Woo Kwok-hing 胡國興	13 January 1946 (age 71)	Nonpartisan (Non-aligned)	Deputy Judge of the Court of First Instance of the High Court (2016)	Announced: 27 October 2016; Nominated: 27 February 2017	180 / 1,194 (15%)
John Tsang 曾俊華	21 April 1951 (age 65)	Nonpartisan (Pro-Beijing)	Financial Secretary (2007–2017)	Announced: 19 January 2017; Nominated: 25 February 2017	165 / 1,194 (14%)

=== Withdrawn ===
Candidate	Born	Party	Most recent position	Campaign	Nominations received
Regina Ip 葉劉淑儀	24 August 1950 (age 66)	New People's Party (Pro-Beijing)	Member of the Legislative Council and New People's Party; Chairwoman (2008–present; 2011–present)	Announced: 15 December 2016; Withdrew: 1 March 2017	Withdrawn
Leung Kwok-hung 梁國雄	27 March 1956 (age 60)	League of Social; Democrats (Pro-democracy)	Member of the Legislative Council (2004–2010, 2010–2017)	Announced: 8 February 2017; Withdrew: 25 February 2017	Withdrawn

Other minor candidates included insurer Jenny Kan Wai-fun, Vincent Lau Chi-wing, barrister Albert Leung Sze-ho, ex-DAB member Wu Sai-chuen and Professor Yu Wing-yin.

=== Expressed interest but did not run ===
- Jasper Tsang Yok-sing, former President of Legislative Council

=== Other potential candidates ===
Individuals listed below were mentioned as potential 2017 Chief Executive candidates in at least two reliable media sources.

- Norman Chan Tak-lam, Chief Executive of the Hong Kong Monetary Authority
- Antony Leung Kam-chung, businessman and former Financial Secretary

=== Declined ===
- Bernard Charnwut Chan, businessman and member of the Executive Council
- Margaret Chan Fung Fu-chun, director-general of the World Health Organization
- Audrey Eu Yuet-mee, former chairwoman of the Civic Party and former member of Legislative Council
- Emily Lau Wai-hing, former chairwoman of Democratic Party and former member of Legislative Council
- Starry Lee Wai-king, chairwoman of Democratic Alliance for the Betterment and Progress of Hong Kong (DAB) and member of Legislative Council
- Leung Chun-ying, incumbent Chief Executive of Hong Kong
- Arthur Li Kwok-cheung, chairman of the Council of the University of Hong Kong
- Frederick Ma Si-hang, chairman of the MTR Corporation
- Henry Tang Ying-yen, former Chief Secretary for Administration and 2012 Chief Executive candidate
- James Tien Pei-chun, honorary chairman of Liberal Party and former member of Legislative Council
- Peter Woo Kwong-ching, former chairman of Wharf Holdings and 1996 Chief Executive candidate

== Pre-nomination events ==
=== October 2016: Emergence of potential candidates ===
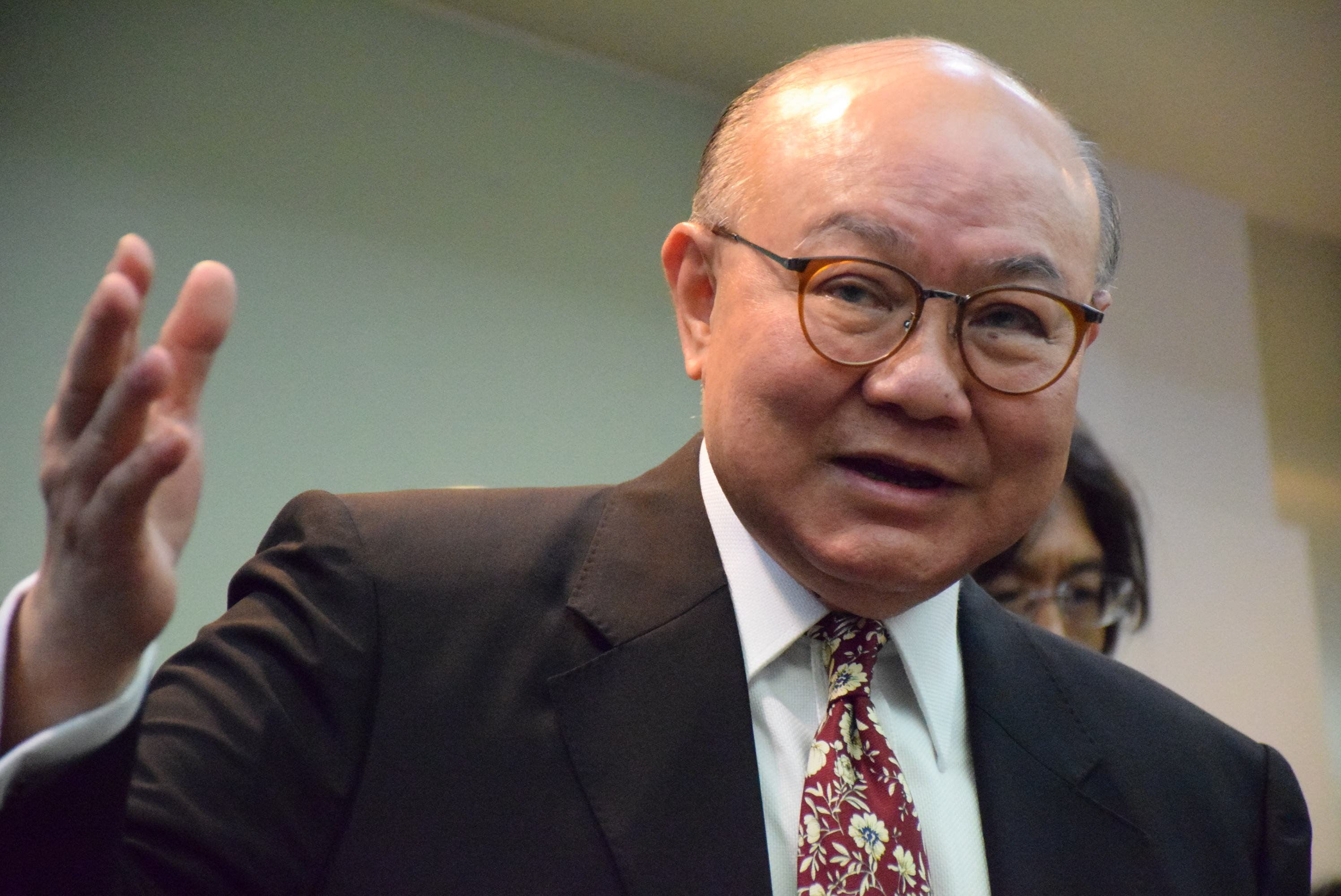
Retired judge Woo Kwok-hing became the first candidate to declare his campaign on 27 October 2016.

The Chief Executive race started as early on 27 October 2016 when retired judge Woo Kwok-hing became the first candidate to declare his campaign. He launched an offensive campaign against incumbent Chief Executive Leung Chun-ying, questioning his achievements during his term, while Woo was being questioned for his lack of experience in public administration.

Around the same time, New People's Party chairwoman Regina Ip, a 2012 candidate who did not receive enough nominations, expressed her interest in running for the second time. She criticised a potential candidate, Financial Secretary John Tsang, for not doing much in the last decade. Tsang responded by saying that "if one can be idle at it for 10 years, [he] has quite a bit of talent." He refused to clarify if he would run, only stating that it was "heaven's secret". Leung Chun-ying, who was expected to seek a second term, also unleashed a thinly veiled attack on Tsang, suggesting ministers should be "responsible" and focus on the upcoming policy address and budget rather than thinking about joining the race. Leung also argued, "will those pushing for the city's independence stop what they are doing? Will those insulting their own country shut up?", referring to the Legislative Council oath-taking controversy. He went on by asking "will the land and housing problems that have accumulated become easier to solve under a new leader or government? Will the cabinet continue to touch on vested interests in the property market with courage and determination, and amid difficulties, to solve the housing problems?"

=== November to December 2016: Pro-democrats' ABC campaign ===
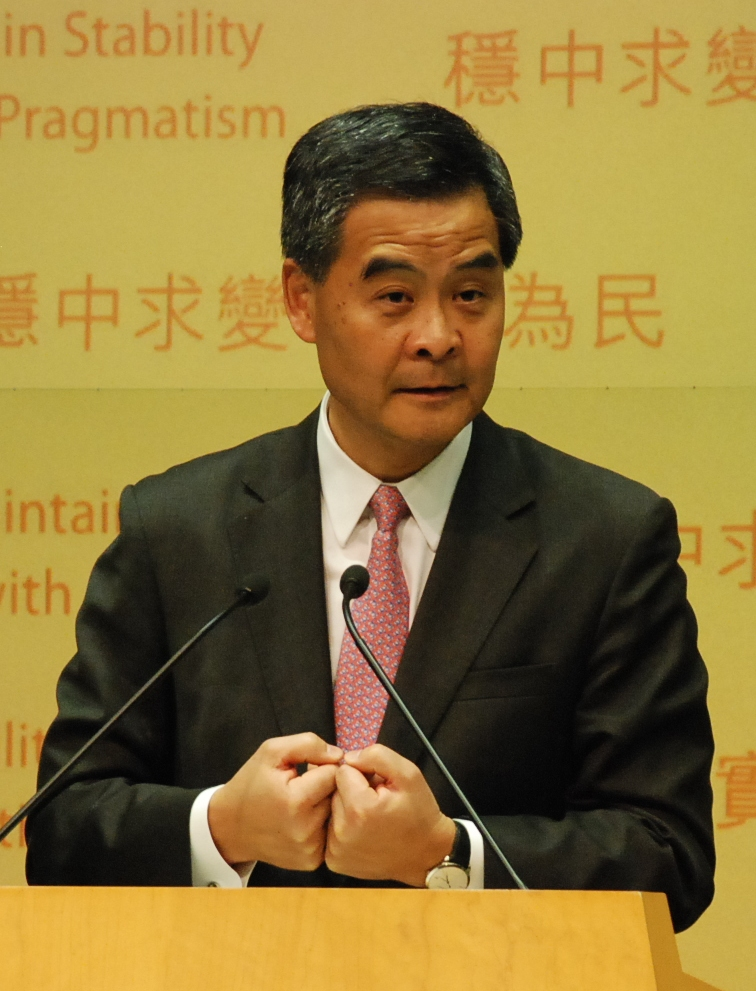
Incumbent Chief Executive Leung Chun-ying announced he would not seek re-election on 9 December 2016.

Professionals and activists formed a loose coalition called "Democrats 300+" hoping to snatch over 300 seats in the Election Committee Subsector elections based on the common platform of opposing Leung Chun-ying's second term, many of whom adopted the slogan "ABC" (Anyone but CY). The camp decided not to field a candidate in the election, but rather boost the chances of an alternative establishment candidate. On 9 December, two days before the election, Leung surprisingly announced he would not seek re-election, citing his daughter's ill health, which made him the first Chief Executive to serve only one term. After Leung's announcement, Chief Secretary for Administration Carrie Lam, who previously said she would retire, expressed that she would have to reconsider running for Chief Executive in order to continue Leung's policies.

Despite Leung's announcement, the pro-democrats still managed to win record 325 out of 1,200 seats in the Election Committee election, more than a quarter of seats with a surge of the turnout nearly 20 percentage points higher than that in the last committee election in 2011. After the election, the two potential candidates, John Tsang and Regina Ip, resigned from their Financial Secretary and Executive Councillor posts on 12 and 15 December respectively, being expected to run.

On 14 December, Woo Kwok-hing became the first one to unveil his electoral platform under the slogan of "Good Heart, Right Path, Bright Future for Hong Kong". He proposed to expand the electorate base for choosing the Election Committee from the current 250,000 to one million in 2022, rising to three million by 2032 and eventually quasi-universal suffrage. His attendees included Andy Ho On-tat, former information coordinator during the Donald Tsang administration from 2006 to 2012.

Regina Ip received the New People's Party's endorsement on 14 December and resigned from the Executive Council on the next day. She announced her candidacy on 15 December under the campaign slogan "Win Back Hong Kong", the same one used in her 2016 Legislative Council campaign. She called for a relaunch of the electoral reform process under Beijing's restrictive framework as decreed by the National People's Congress Standing Committee (NPCSC) on 31 August 2014. She also pledged to enact controversial Basic Law Article 23 with "suitable measures". Her campaign launching rally was attended by former colonial Chief Secretary Sir David Akers-Jones and businessman Allan Zeman as special advisers to Ip's campaign office.

In late December, Wang Guangya, director of the Hong Kong and Macau Affairs Office (HKMAO), laid out four basic criteria for the next Chief Executive in an interview with a pro-Beijing magazine: loves China, loves Hong Kong, who Beijing can trust, and capable of governing and supported by the Hong Kong people, in that order.

=== Mid January 2017: Carrie Lam and John Tsang enter the race ===
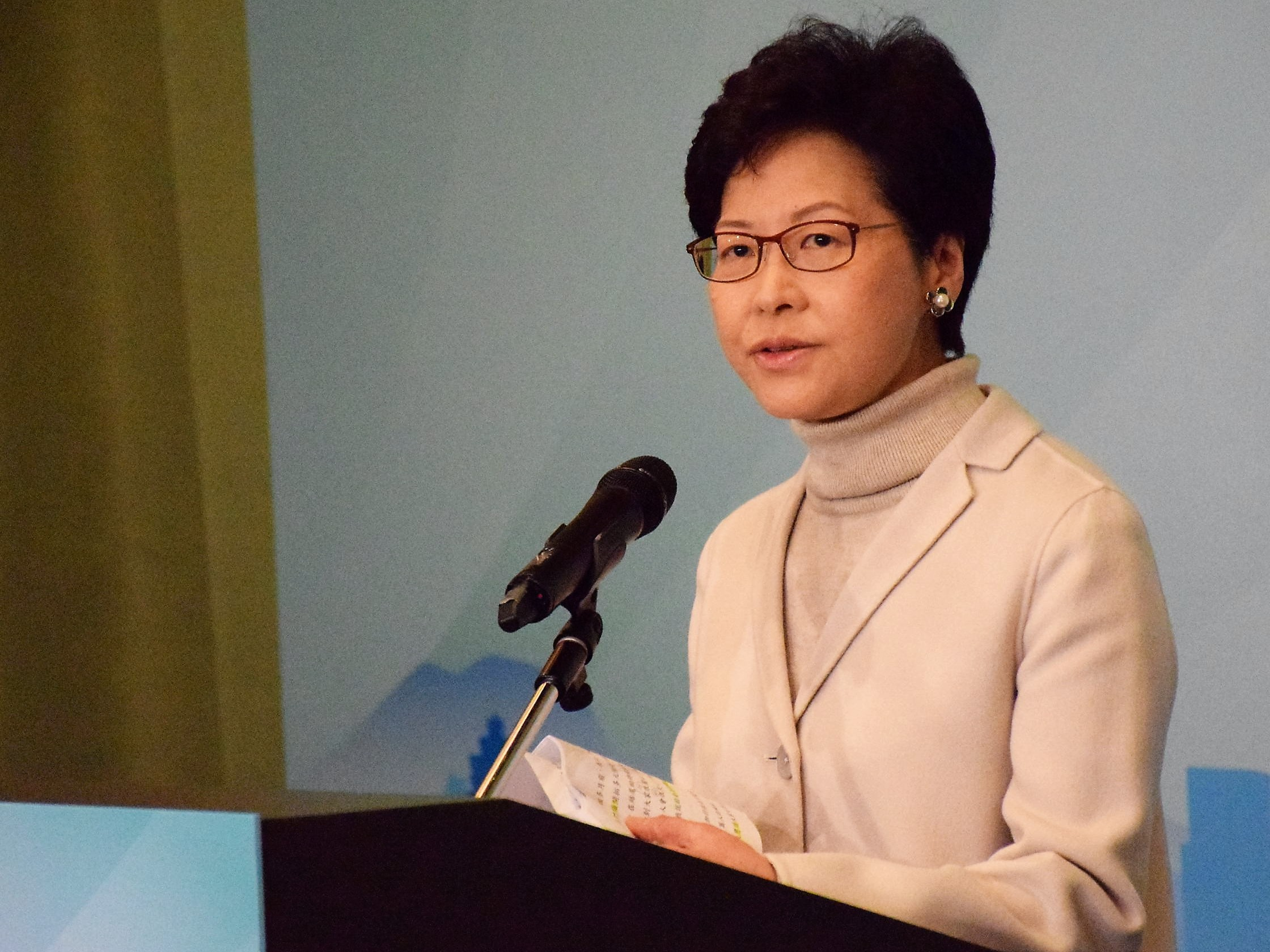
Former Chief Secretary for Administration Carrie Lam announced her candidacy on 16 January 2017, and was seen as Beijing's preferred choice.

On 12 January 2017, Carrie Lam resigned from her Chief Secretary post (having at some point previously renounced her British citizenship, which would have excluded her from running) and announced her plan to run for Chief Executive if her resignation was approved. In a closed-door meeting, she laid out an eight-point "achievable new vision" for Hong Kong and told participants that God had called on her to run. On 16 January, the two Secretaries' resignations were simultaneously approved by the central government. Some pro-Beijing politicians saw this as a sign that Lam was the central government's favoured candidate, as Tsang had resigned a full month before Lam. Lam officially declared her candidacy on the same day, promising good governance with greater transparency and "new blood" in her cabinet, at a press conference in which she was joined by Executive Councillor Bernard Chan, director of her campaign office. The chairman's council of her campaign office included prominent figures, former Hong Kong Stock Exchange chairman Ronald Arculli among them.

As Lam declared her candidacy and Tsang was expected to run, political analysts observed that Regina Ip's chances of getting the minimum 150 nominations were reduced. Ip revealed that two or three electors, including Allan Zeman, had turned their backs on her to support Lam. A teary-eyed Ip told a media gathering on 17 January, "[i]n the past ten years I started from nothing, working hard bit by bit, splashing out my own money, putting in much mental and physical effort. Can you say I had not taken on responsibilities for Hong Kong society? When I handled Article 23, I did not perform satisfactorily?" Ip's remarks came after Leung Chun-ying praised Lam for her "ability and willingness to take on responsibility".

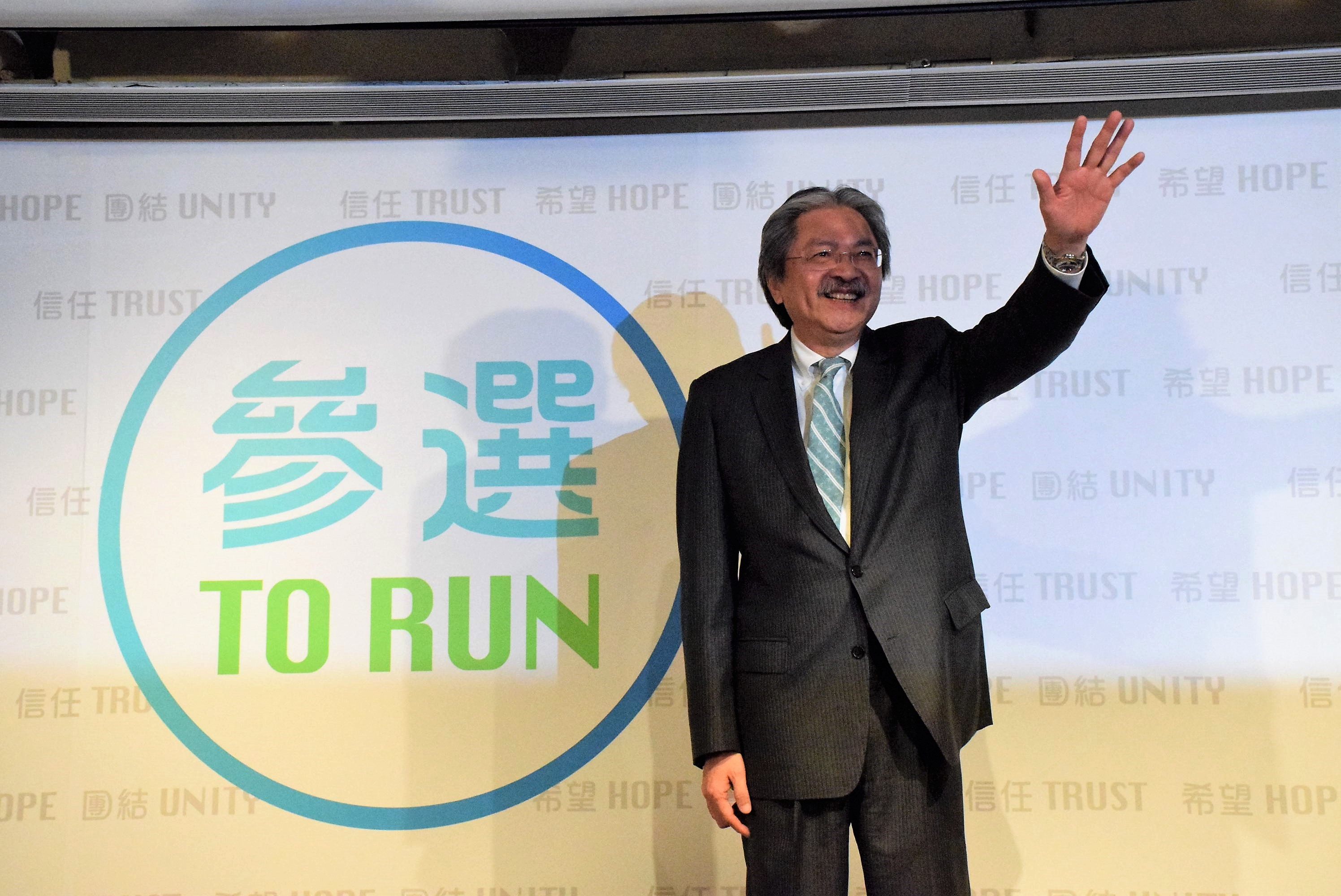
Former Financial Secretary John Tsang launched his campaign on 19 January 2017 after his long-awaited resignation was approved by the central government.

John Tsang officially declared his candidacy on 19 January with a slogan of "Trust, Unity, Hope", after more than a month-long delay in the acceptance of his resignation by the central government, which put his campaign in limbo. To contrast himself with Lam, who was perceived to follow Leung Chun-ying's hardline and divisive policies, Tsang described himself as a good listener accepting of different views. He appealed to "all 7.35 million Hongkongers so that together we can make Hong Kong a better place." Retired senior civil servant former Permanent Secretary for the Civil Service Rebecca Lai Ko Wing-yee and former Permanent Secretary for Food and Health Sandra Lee Suk-yee became director and officer of Tsang's campaign office respectively, despite a number of his supporters switching to Lam's camp amid reports suggesting he failed to get endorsement from Beijing. Tsang also launched his election Facebook page, which drew more than 100,000 likes in a day.

In a closed-door meeting with senior media executives on 20 January, Lam reportedly said she decided to run to prevent the election from being won by someone not accepted by Beijing, which would cause "constitutional crisis". Woo Kwok-hing criticised Lam for using a "despicable tactic" to attack her opponents. Lam's campaign office later clarified that Lam was only making a general comment without targeting anybody in particular. She was also criticised for being out of touch with ordinary people after she appeared unfamiliar with how to use an Octopus card to pass through a turnstile in the Mass Transit Railway (MTR). A similar gaffe followed shortly thereafter when it was reported that Lam did not know convenience stores do not sell toilet paper and had to take a cab back to her former official residence to get one, which was dubbed "loo paper-gate" by English media.

=== Late January to early February 2017: Canvassing nominations ===
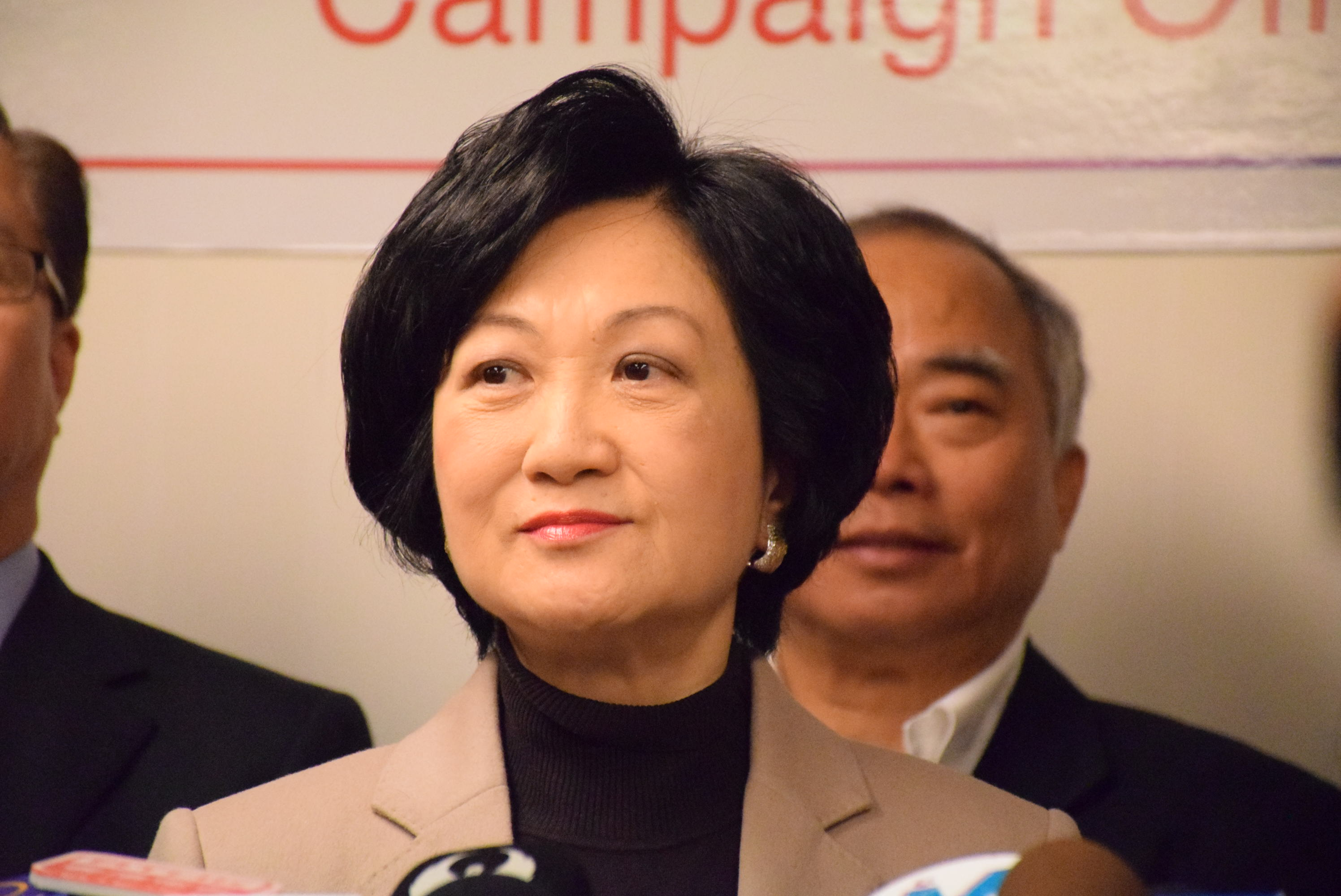
New People's Party Regina Ip faced an uphill battle to garner nominations after Lam and Tsang announced their candidacies.

After days of candidates meeting with the Election Committee members from different sectors to canvass at least 150 nominations in order to enter the race, by 27 January multiple reports speculated that Carrie Lam had already secured 300 to 400 nominations. Heung Yee Kuk and the New Territories Association of Societies (NTAS) stated that they inclined to nominate Lam. Together with pro-Beijing parties Democratic Alliance for the Betterment and Progress of Hong Kong (DAB), Hong Kong Federation of Trade Unions (FTU), and Business and Professionals Alliance for Hong Kong (BPA), as well as Import and Export subsector and Sports and Culture sub-subsectors, Lam was estimated to grab more than 500 nominations. In contrast, despite topping the public opinion polls, John Tsang was speculated to have secured fewer than 100 nominations. Tsang stated "[t]here is no reason for me to believe that the central government does not trust me," as pro-Beijing electors felt pressured if nominate him amid the speculation that he was not Beijing's choice. Regina Ip was speculated to hold about 20 nominations from her New People's Party, while Woo Kwok-hing, who had not revealed any electors' endorsement, repeatedly said he was confident in receiving enough nominations.

Hours before Carrie Lam's large-scale election rally on 3 February, John Tsang launched a crowdfunding website. The website went down within minutes due to overloading. The public responded actively, with more than one million Hong Kong dollars being raised in just the first few hours. Former Secretary for Development Mak Chai-kwong, despite being the former top aide to Carrie Lam, also showed support for Tsang in a Facebook video. Under the campaign slogan of "We Connect", including the catchphrases "We Care, We Listen, We Act", Lam's campaign rally was attended by nearly 800 pro-Beijing figures and tycoons from both the Henry Tang and Leung Chun-ying camps in the last election. She also revealed a star-studded campaign team, which included a council of chairpersons consisting of Ronald Arculli, Laura Cha, Moses Cheng, Jonathan Choi Koon-sum, Timothy Fok, Lam Tai-fai, Eddy Li Sau-hung, Victor Lo, Lo Man-tuen, Anthony Wu, Yu Kwok-chun and Allan Zeman; senior advisers consisting of heavyweights including senior pro-Beijing politicians including Chan Wing-kee, Cheng Yiu-tong, Hung Chao-hong and Rita Fan, tycoons such as Robin Chan, Aron Harilela, Xu Rongmao, Robert Kuok, Peter Lam, Lee Shau-kee, Vincent Lo, Robert Ng, Peter Woo and Charles Yeung and others such as Lawrence Lau, Lau Chin-shek, Li Fung-ying and Joseph Yam.

On 5 February, Woo Kwok-hing updated his election platform, including the implementation of the Basic Law Article 22, which states that no mainland authorities can interfere in Hong Kong internal affairs. On the next day, John Tsang unveiled his 75-page election platform entitled "Convergence of Hearts, Proactive Enablement", with the promise of revisiting Article 23 national security legislation and political reform. Other policies included introducing a progressive profit tax, developing New Territories North and East Lantau and abolishing all Territory-wide System Assessment (TSA) and Basic Competency Assessment (BCA) tests, among others.

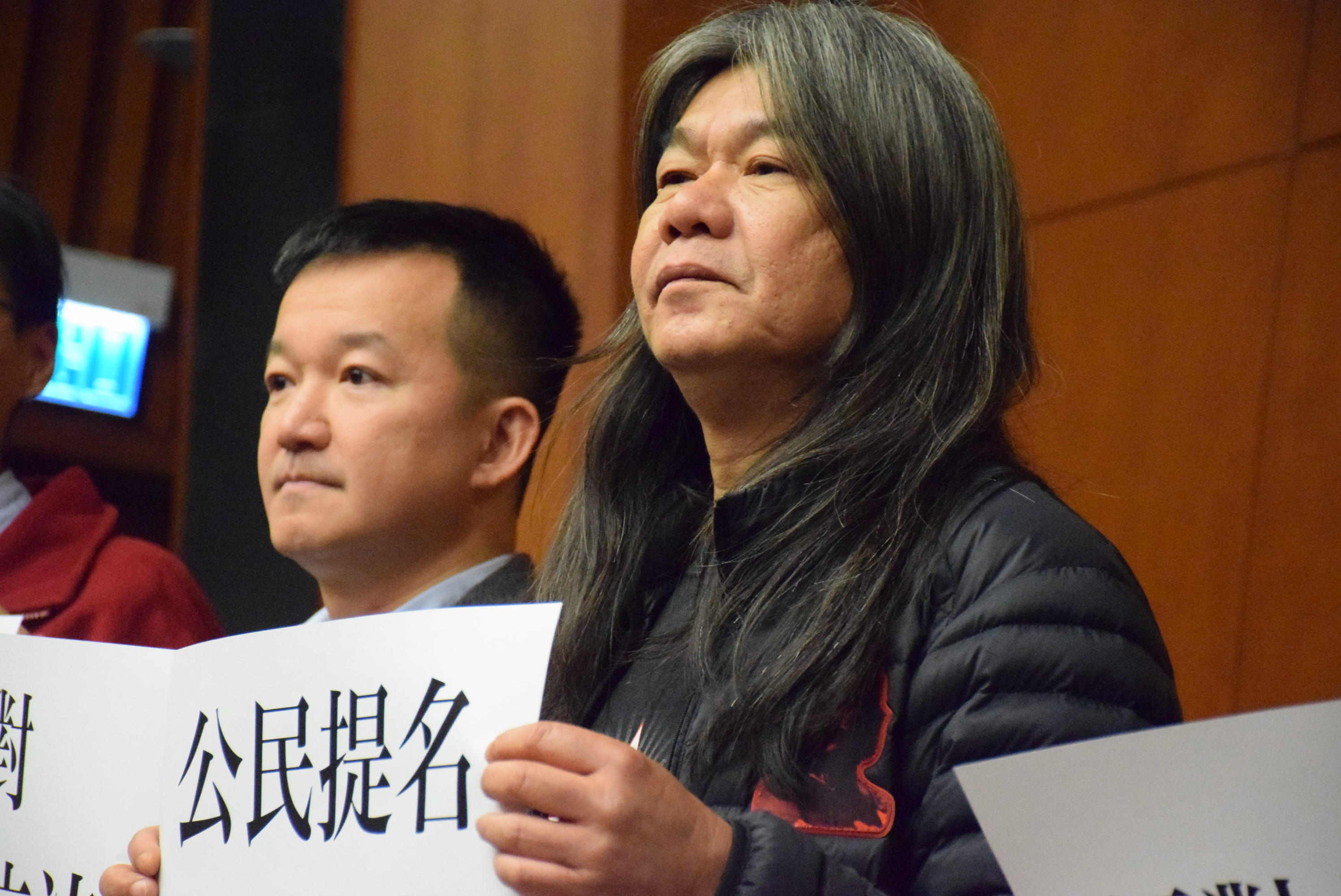
Pro-democracy legislator Leung Kwok-hung announced his candidacy through the "civil nomination" campaign on 8 February.

Legislator "Long Hair" Leung Kwok-hung of the League of Social Democrats (LSD) formally announced his Chief Executive bid on 8 February through a "civil nomination" mechanism conducted by post-Occupy group Citizens United in Action, in which he would seek to secure 37,790 votes from members of the public, one per cent of the city's registered voters before he would canvass for the nominations from the Election Committee. He explained his decision was to urge the pro-democrat electors not to vote for any pro-establishment candidate who could not represent the pro-democracy camp at all even if they view as "lesser evil", as some democrats had inclined to support John Tsang, the relatively liberal pro-establishment candidate to prevent hardliner Carrie Lam from winning. He also aimed to reflect the spirit of the 2014 Umbrella Movement and the voice of those low-income people. His bid was supported by four radical democrat legislators People Power's Raymond Chan, Demosisto's Nathan Law, Lau Siu-lai and Eddie Chu, while the mainstream pro-democrats cast doubt over Leung's candidacy, believing it would contribute to the victory to Carrie Lam.

Being the only one of the four candidates who had not published an election platform, Carrie Lam held a press conference titled "WeConnect: Manifesto Step 2" on 13 February, one day before the nomination period, to reveal some details of her manifesto, including boosting education spending to HK$5 billion, tax cut to small- and medium-sized enterprises, and creating more land for housing through reclamation, urban redevelopment, and developing brownfield sites or country parks.

=== Allegations of Beijing manipulation ===
There were reports that central government officials had given a "red light" to John Tsang running in the election and had allegedly asked John Tsang not to run more than ten times, including rumours of him being offered the deputy governor post at the Asian Infrastructure Investment Bank in return for not running. Tsang refuted such claims, only saying that there were "friends" who supported him and some who did not.

On 17 January, New People's Party deputy chairman Michael Tien complained the election had "lost its shape" due to the increasing interference of "an invisible hand". He revealed that many of the 1,194 Election Committee members had received phone calls asking them to nominate certain candidates. Tien did not disclose the name of the candidate backed by the "invisible hand", even though the Liaison Office had reportedly informed senior editors of the local pro-Beijing newspapers that Carrie Lam was Beijing's preferred candidate, and had actively lobbied for Lam. The senior editors were told to "gradually devote more extensive coverage" to Lam. However, several political observers, as well as the pro-Beijing Sing Pao Daily News who has launched months-long headline editorial attacks on the Liaison Office, said the Liaison Office does not reflect Beijing's wishes on the matter as the election has become part of the power struggle within the Chinese Communist Party in which the Liaison Office tries to keep its grip on Hong Kong. In late February, Sing Pao staff began to be harassed and stalked by unknown individuals. A residence of a staff member was also splashed with red paint and threatening leaflets were thrown around the staff members' homes.

Carrie Lam dismissed speculation that the Liaison Office had been canvassing for her behind the scenes, saying that she did not see any evidence or the need for the Liaison Office to lobby for her. Lam later added that she has no power to tell the Liaison Office not to lobby the electors to vote for her in an interview. She admitted that it would be counterproductive if the public believed a "visible hand" was behind the election.

On 6 February, multiple media reports said National People's Congress (NPC) chairman Zhang Dejiang, who was also head of the Communist Party's Central Coordination Group for Hong Kong and Macau Affairs, and Sun Chunlan, head of the party's United Front Work Department, were in Shenzhen to meet with some Election Committee members from the major business chambers and political groups. It was reported that Zhang told the electors that the Politburo of the Communist Party that had decided to support Carrie Lam in the election.

During the nomination period, it was reported that HKMAO director Wang Guangya told the electors at a meeting in Shenzhen that John Tsang was the contender with the least support from the central government. Few days later, Hong Kong Economic Journal cited unnamed sources that Tung Chee-hwa, former Chief Executive and vice-chairman of the Chinese People's Political Consultative Conference (CPPCC) said in a closed-door meeting that Beijing may not appoint Tsang as Chief Executive even if he wins the election. He said this was the reason he asked Carrie Lam to run in the election in order to prevent an "embarrassing situation". 30 electors of the Legal subsector in the Election Committee expressed "deep concerns" about Tung's comments in a joint statement, stating that "such action undermines the fairness of our Chief Executive election and shows a callous disregard for the aspirations of most Hong Kong people to have free and fair elections without ignorant and insensitive interference."

Regina Ip also said in an interview that someone claiming to have close relations with Beijing had offered to compensate her with top posts at the NPC or the CPPCC if she quit the race, but she had refused the offers, stating that she was not interested in any "consolation prize".

== Nominations ==
The nomination period ran from 14 February to 1 March 2017. A minimum number of 150 nominations from members of the Election Committee must be acquired in order to stand in the election.

Nominations received in the Election Committee by each candidate
1. Carrie Lam (48.6%)
2. Woo Kwok-hing (15.0%)
3. John Tsang (13.8%)
4. Did not nominate (22.6%)

On 25 February, John Tsang became the first candidate to submit his nominations. Amid the alleged pressure from the Liaison Office which actively lobbied for Carrie Lam, Tsang struggled to seek nominations from the pro-Beijing camp and had to rely heavily on the pro-democrats. Liberal Party honorary chairman James Tien was one of the few pro-Beijing electors to publicly endorse John Tsang earlier on 19 January, stating that he would nominate Tsang. Liberal Party's Selina Chow and leader Chung Kwok-pan also nominated Tsang, making Liberal Party the only pro-Beijing party to nominate Tsang. Thomas Wu, son of tycoon Gordon Wu of the Hopewell Holdings, was among the only tycoon to nominate Tsang, although his father nominated Carrie Lam. Film director Derek Yee became the only elector from his subsector to nominate Tsang.

Out of Tsang's total of 165 nominations, 127 came from the pro-democracy camp. Five pro-democracy electors from the High Education subsector became the first pro-democrats to nominate Tsang, followed by Democratic Action Accountants, handing 17 nominations to Tsang. On 16 February, the Democratic Party announced its seven legislators would nominate Tsang, making it the first time a pro-democratic party nominated an establishment candidate. Pro-democrat Hong Kong Professional Teachers' Union (HKPTU) also backed Tsang with its 35 nominations from the Education and Higher Education subsectors. The other sectors where Tsang received the most nominations included Information Technology, where he bagged 21 of the 30 nominations. He also received half of the nominations from the Medical subsector. Tsang was criticised by pro-Beijing media and politicians for accepting support from the pro-democracy camp. Tam Yiu-chung said that Tsang now clearly represented the pan-democrats while an editorial in the Beijing mouthpiece Ta Kung Pao attacked Tsang for "making a deal with the devils".

Woo Kwok-hing made an emergency plea for support after getting just three nominations on the first day of the nomination period. As the "Democrats 300+" planned to nominate John Tsang and Woo Kwok-hing to boost the competitiveness of the election, Woo gradually received nominations from pro-democrat electors. Six electors from the Higher Education subsector including Civic Party founding chairman Kuan Hsin-chi became the first pro-democrats to decide to nominate Woo, on 15 February. 46 pro-democracy members also decided to nominate Woo subsequently. After Tsang received enough nominations, pro-democrat electors turned to nominate Woo. On 27 February, Woo became the second candidate to be nominated, with 180 of nominations, almost all of them came from the pro-democracy camp.

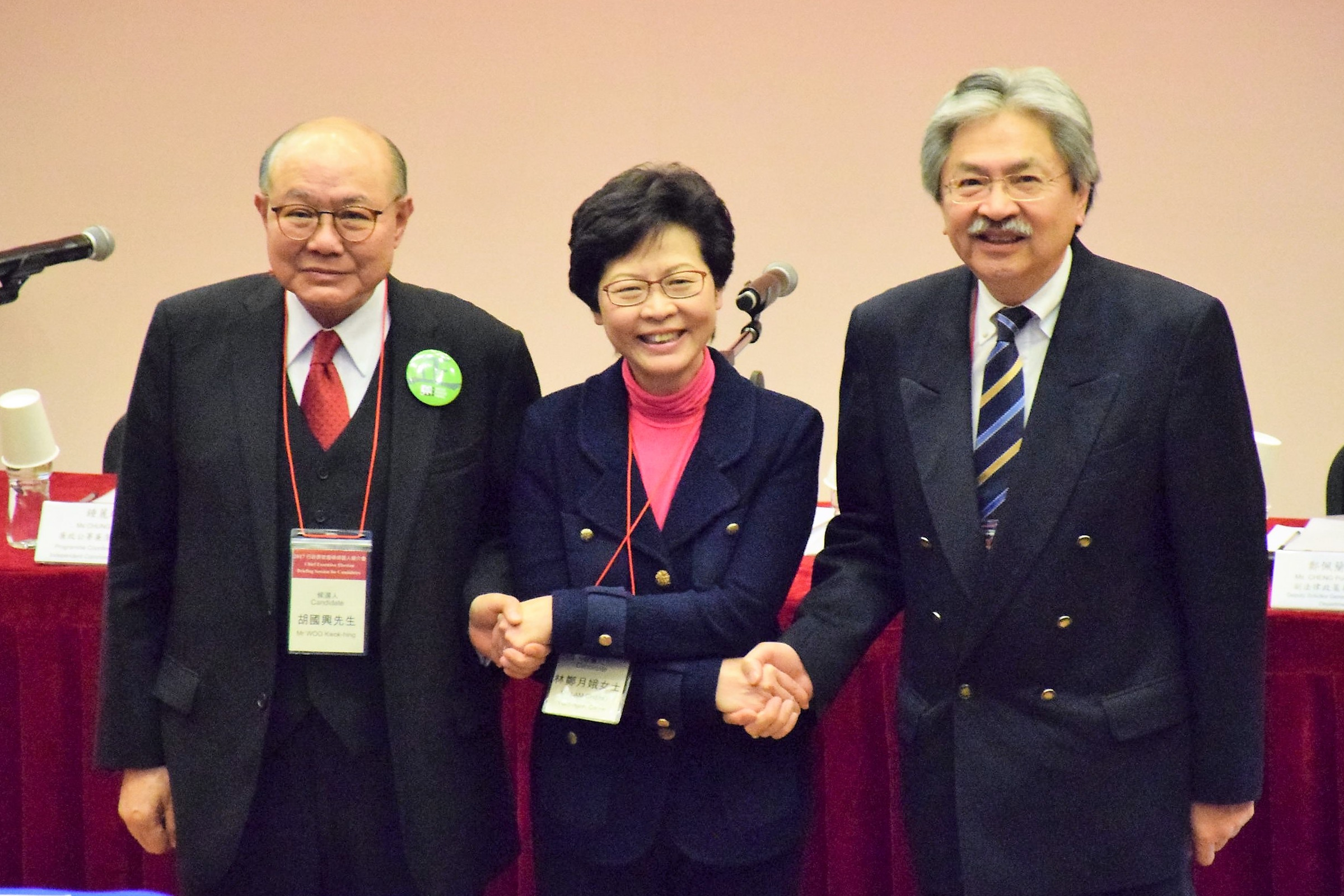
The three nominees who stood in the final election: Woo Kwok-hing, Carrie Lam and John Tsang.

Carrie Lam submitted a total of 579 nominations on 28 February, and submitted an extra one on the next day, just 21 votes short of the final number needed to win the race. Although she was widely seen to have secured more than a minimum number of 150 nominations in the early stage, she reportedly aimed at securing more than 600 nominations to project herself as a clear winner before the secret ballot. Lam dominated in the business and politics sectors, winning three-quarters of the votes in the business sector, but failed to receive any nomination from the pro-democracy camp. The pro-Beijing Chinese General Chamber of Commerce (CGGC) which commanded the 18-seat Commercial (Second) subsector became the first chamber to declare it would hand all its nominations to Lam on 8 January. The two pro-Beijing parties Business and Professionals Alliance for Hong Kong (BPA) and Democratic Alliance for the Betterment and Progress of Hong Kong (DAB), which commanded over 100 votes, also endorsed Lam. However, instead of bundling their votes the two parties allowed their electors to freely nominate any candidate. Some DAB legislators did not nominate Lam at the end, including Holden Chow and Elizabeth Quat. Contrary to observers’ expectations, the Labour subsector, which is dominated by the pro-Beijing Hong Kong Federation of Trade Unions (FTU), also returned only five out of its 60 nominations to Lam as its legislator Wong Kwok-kin earlier expressed reservations about Lam's proposed labour policies, although it was seen as Lam's strategy to reserve her strength. The same happened with the pro-Beijing-dominated Hong Kong Chinese Enterprises Association and Hong Kong and Kowloon District Councils subsectors, which commanded 73 votes combined but handed only two nominations to Lam.

Other political sectors such as the 27-seat Heung Yee Kuk and 51-seat Chinese People's Political Consultative Conference (CPPCC), including deputy chairman of the CK Hutchison Holdings Victor Li, also decided they would hand in all their nominations to Lam, although Li's father, Hong Kong most influential tycoon Li Ka-shing, had refused to back any candidate despite alleged Liaison Office pressure. "But I would definitely cast my vote," Li said. "You would offend people by nominating [a specific candidate] but no one would know who I voted for [in the secret ballot]."

In response to controversy surrounding her lack of a full election platform, Lam revealed a manifesto titled "Connecting for Consensus and A Better Future" on 27 February, two days before the nomination period ended. The platform focused on reforming the government structure and boosting the economy, including expanding the Central Policy Unit, establishing a Culture Bureau and a new Tourism Bureau, and dividing Transport and Housing Bureau into two, but did not make any promise on relaunching electoral reform or Article 23 legislation.

Regina Ip withdrew from the election, conceding the number of nominations hours before the nomination deadline on 1 March, for the second time after her 2012 bid. She received a number of nominations "far behind what was needed", despite backing from her New People's Party and a few electors from business sectors. Ip also gained a nomination from a pro-democrat elector from the Accountancy subsector, who wished to send Ip into the race to split Lam's votes. However, as Lam aimed to grab more than 600 nominations, Ip faced an uphill battle to secure her nominations. She urged "a certain candidate" not to ask for additional backing since that person had secured more than enough nominations already. She attributed her failure to the restrictive selection process of the 1,200 structure of the Election Committee membership as she was "squeezed out" by the Beijing-supported Lam and democrat-supported Tsang and Woo.

Candidate	Estimated nominations	Nominators	Ref
Carrie Lam	580 / 1,194 (49%)	Blocs: Agriculture and Fisheries, Business and Professionals Alliance for Hong Kong, Catering, Chinese General Chamber of Commerce, Chinese Manufacturers' Association of Hong Kong^{15/18}, Chinese Medicine^{12/30}, Chinese Muslim Cultural and Fraternal Association, Chinese People's Political Consultative Conference, Confucian Academy, Culture^{9/15}, Democratic Alliance for the Betterment and Progress of Hong Kong, Employers' Federation of Hong Kong^{9/16}, EP30^{10/15}, Federation of Hong Kong Industries^{17/18}, Finance^{15/18}, Financial Services^{16/18}, Heung Yee Kuk, Hong Kong Buddhist Association, Hong Kong General Chamber of Commerce^{12/18}, Hong Kong Taoist Association^{8/10}, Hotel^{14/17}, Import and Export^{11/17}, Insurance^{12/18}, National People's Congress^{31/33}, New Territories District Councils^{53/70}, Performing Arts^{13/15}, Real Estate and Construction^{16/18}, Sports, Textiles and Garment^{14/18}, Tourism^{11/18}, Transport^{8/18}, Wholesale and Retail^{16/18} Individuals: Chan Chun-ying, Frank Cheng Chi-yan, Tommy Cheung, Chow Luen-kiu, Fung Tak-lee, Junius Ho, Lam King, Lam Shuk-yee, Lee Sau-king, Leung Yiu-wah, Ma Fung-kwok, Anthony Vincent Ng Wing-shun, Jimmy Ng, Shiu Ka-fai, Tam Chi-chung, Marco Wu Moon-hoi, Frankie Yick, Yiu Si-wing	
Woo Kwok-hing	180 / 1,194 (15%)	Blocs: Academics in Support of Democracy^{13/30}, Civic Party, CoVision16^{13/16}, Demo-Social Front^{18/22}, Democratic Action Accountants^{2/21}, Doctors for Democracy^{14/19}, Health Professionals for Democracy 30^{22/30}, Hong Kong Social Workers' General Union, IT Vision^{8/30}, Land5cape 2016, Legal^{20/30}, O Superpower, Progressive Engineering, Together for Social Welfare Individuals: Fernando Cheung, Chan Kan-tik, James Kwok Tsz-kwan, Joseph Lee, Lee Ka-lun, Shiu Ka-chun, Tsang Yuk-ting, Tung Chung-yin, Haster Wu Ka-yi, Raymond Yeung Chi-leung, Yeung Tak-yu, Yiu Chung-yim, Waiky Yiu Kwok-wai	
John Tsang	165 / 1,194 (14%)	Blocs: ABC.P.A^{3/4}, Academics in Support of Democracy^{16/30}, CoVision16^{3/16}, Demo-Social Front^{3/22}, Democrat Professionals Hong Kong, Democratic Action Accountants^{19/21}, Democratic Party, Doctors for Democracy^{5/19}, Health Professionals for Democracy 30^{6/30}, Hearts of Accountants, Hong Kong Professional Teachers' Union, IT Vision^{21/30}, Legal^{6/30}, Professional Commons, Public Doctor HK Individuals: Fiona Chan Ho-yan, Chan Kin-yung, Pierre Chan, Chan Tong-sang, Ricky Chim Kim-lun, Choi Kin, Selina Chow, Charles Chu Sai-ping, Chung Kwok-pan, Ho Pak-leung, Ronnie Ho Pak-ting, Ip Hing-cheung, Kwan Ka-lun, Kelvin Lau Chi-to, Lee Yu-ming, Leung Ka-lau, Luk Wang-kwong, Mak Suet-ching, Man Ka-leung, Ng Ming-him, Jason Shum Jiu-sang, Tang Wai-yee, James Tien, Tsui Luen-on, Wan Siu-fai, Thomas Jefferson Wu, Derek Yee, Yim Shun-see, Banny Yu Yuen-mau	

=== Pro-democrats' civil nomination ===
The pro-democracy group Citizens United in Action, which was formed to promote Occupy Central initiator Benny Tai's "ThunderGo" plan in the 2016 Legislative Council election, launched the "CE Civil Referendum 2017" to engage the general Hong Kong population, who had no vote in the election. It conducted a "civil nomination" online, from 7 to 22 February, in co-operation with the University of Hong Kong Public Opinion Programme (HKUPOP) and the Centre for Social Policy Studies (CSPS) of the Hong Kong Polytechnic University. Any candidate that secured 37,790 votes, one per cent of Hong Kong's registered voters, from the general public would be a "civil candidate" in a "civil referendum" to be held from 10 to 19 March. On 13 February, the Office of the Privacy Commissioner for Personal Data issued a statement concerning the "existing privacy risks" of the organisers collecting personal data. In response to that, the organisers updated their system afterward and extended the nomination period until 28 February.

On 25 February, Leung Kwok-hung who pledged to only enter the race if he received enough civil nominations announced he would not run for the Chief Executive, as he only secured 20,234 nominations from the general public, about 17,000 fewer than the threshold. Among the 20,234 nominations, 13,440 were collected in public while the rest of them online. Leung stated that his being able to collect more than 20,000 nominations with personal contact information and identity card numbers had proved that "civil nomination" is achievable. None of the candidates received the minimum number of 37,790 in the "civil nomination" as a result.

== Debates and forums ==
There were a few forums organised during the nomination period, including a public forum organised by D100 Radio on 19 February attended by Leung Kwok-hung and Woo Kwok-hing and a forum organised by Power for Democracy on 25 February and attended by Regina Ip and Woo Kwok-hing.

Schedule of the 2017 Chief Executive election debates and forums
No.	Date	Time	Host	Moderator(s)	Participants		
P Participant. I Invitee. N Non-invitee. A Absent invitee.					Tsang	Lam	Woo
1	5 March 2017	7:30 p.m.	Path of Democracy	Joseph Tse; Ronny Tong; Stephen Chiu	A	P	P
2	6 March 2017	Afternoon	Hong Kong Federation of Insurers	Ronnie Ng	A	P	P
3	8 March 2017	7:30 p.m.	IT Vision/Charles Mok	Danny Fung	P	A	P
4	10 March 2017	10:00 a.m.	Hong Kong Journalist Association	Shum Yee-lan; Allan Au	P	P	P
5	12 March 2017	2:00 p.m.	Hong Kong Professional Teachers'; Union	Ryan Lau	P	P	P
6	14 March 2017	8:00 p.m.	now TV/Cable TV/TVB/ Phoenix HK/CRHK/ Metro Radio/RTHK	Kenneth Ng (TVB); Mei Wong (Cable TV)	P	P	P
7	19 March 2017	7:00 p.m.	Preparatory Committee for the Chief Executive Election Forum	Joseph Tse; Kaman Lee	P	P	P
8	22 March 2017	7:00 p.m.	Legal subsector	Ambrose Ho	P	A	P

=== 5 March 2017 – Path of Democracy ===
The first election forum after the nomination period was held on 5 March 2017 by think tank Path of Democracy. John Tsang was absent from the debate, as it was speculated that Tsang saw convenor of Path of Democracy Ronny Tong as Carrie Lam’s supporter. In the debate, Lam tried to distance herself from unpopular current Chief Executive Leung Chun-ying, dismissing suggestions by Woo that she was "Leung Chun-ying 2.0", while Woo Kwok-hing was targeted for his lack of experience in finance.

=== 12 March 2017 – Hong Kong Professional Teachers' Union ===
An election forum was organised by the Hong Kong Professional Teachers' Union (HKPTU) in which all three candidates met on the same stage for the first time. The candidates took turns to answer questions from the electors as well as some 400 educators in the audience. Carrie Lam said she is a victim of "white terror" in response to online attacks on her, as well as on her supporter actress Josephine Siao. John Tsang refuted Lam, saying that online comments are not "white terror" but suppression on dissent.

=== 14 March 2017 – Seven media outlets ===
Candidate	Polls
Tsang	81.38%
Lam	13.95%
Woo	4.67%

A two-hour televised debate co-organised by seven electronic media outlets took place at TVB City on 14 March 2017. All three candidates received questions from members of the audience and journalists and also directed their questions at each other. Tsang criticised Lam for being "CY 2.0", the second version of the divisive incumbent Leung Chun-ying, saying that people fear society will have "split 2.0" if Lam wins. Lam challenged Tsang for advocating a progressive profits tax, an idea he had opposed during his office as Financial Secretary. Lam also dropped a bombshell by stating that she would resign if her position was contrary to mainstream public opinion. Former candidate Regina Ip and political scientist Ma Ngok said that Tsang won the debate while Woo was clearly not prepared. On the other hand, commentator Michael Chugani said none of the three was able to deliver a knock-out blow to emerge the winner.

=== 19 March 2017 – Election Committee ===
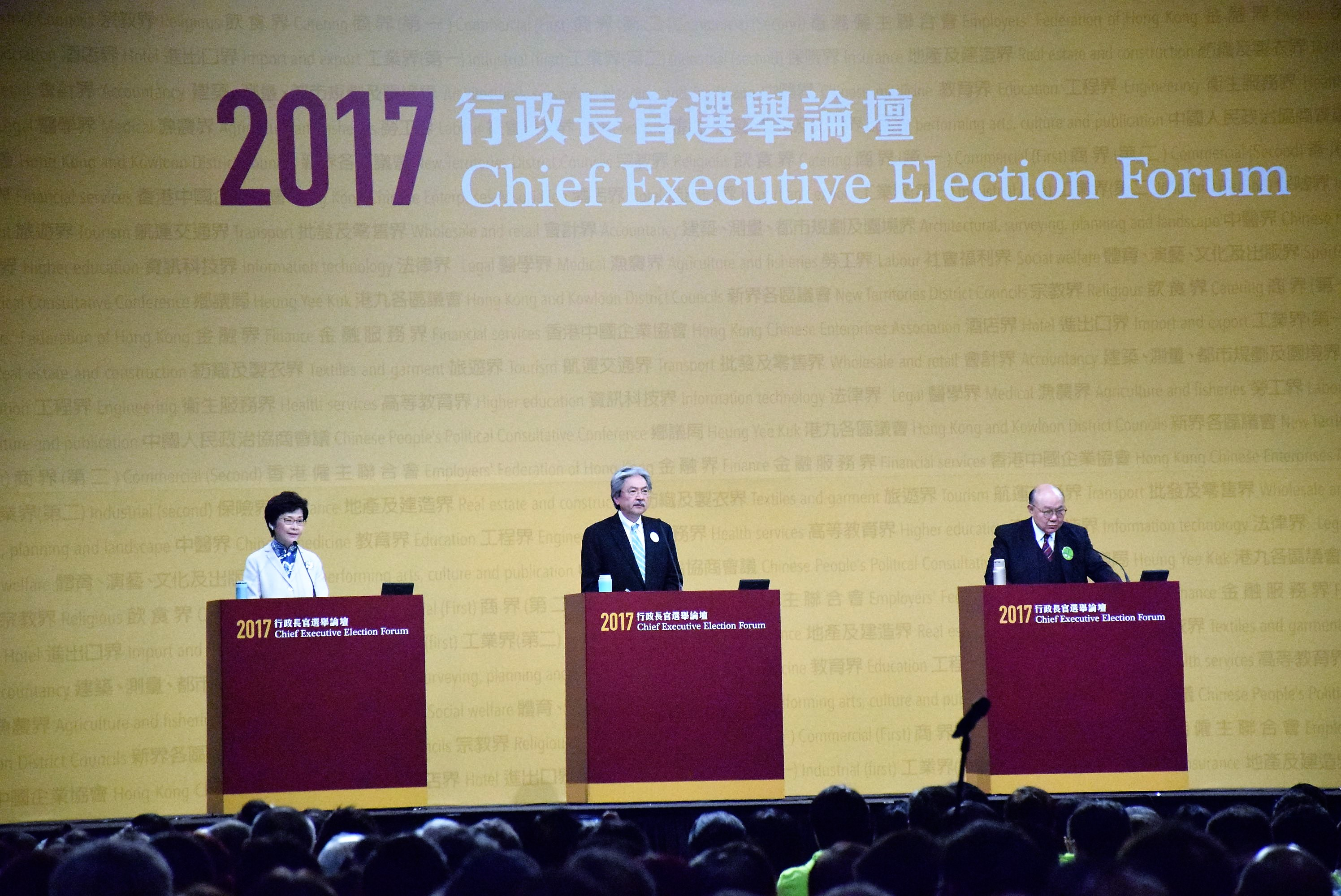
All three candidates attended the election forum organised by the Election Committee members.

A two-hour forum was co-organised by a group of Election Committee members from both the pro-democracy and pro-Beijing camps on 19 March 2017 at AsiaWorld-Expo. Some 507 of the 1,194 election committee members attended the forum. The three candidates took 21 questions from the floor, 19 of which were from the democrats as the pro-Beijing electors did not submit their questions. Lam made a dig at John Tsang's "paperless office" when he was in office as Financial Secretary – an implication of Tsang's laid-back working style. Tsang retorted by saying that it was more important to "work smart" than "work hard". John Tsang also mocked Lam by stating that she would be a "three-low" Chief Executive with low popularity, low energy and low legitimacy. Woo criticised Tsang and Lam for passing the buck on the incumbent government's mistakes. Political scientist Ivan Choy said Tsang was the best performer although Lam also made big progress. According to a poll conducted by the University of Hong Kong Public Opinion Programme (HKUPOP) after the forum, 62 per cent out of the 717 respondents said they would vote for Tsang if eligible after watching the forum, against 24 per cent for Lam and seven per cent for Woo.

== Pro-democrats' civil referendum ==
Following the experience of conducting the "civil referendum" in the previous election in 2012, the pro-democracy group Citizens United in Action led by Occupy Central co-founder Benny Tai again launched a "civil referendum" for this election, ranging from 10 to 19 March through online app Telegram or at physical booths at the campuses of the University of Hong Kong, Chinese University of Hong Kong and Hong Kong Polytechnic University on 12 and 19 March. The referendum was said to engage the general public, which lacks the right to vote. The public was asked to pick "support, oppose or abstain" for each of the three candidates. The 325-member "Democrats 300+" on the Election Committee agreed to take either "major reference" from the result or to completely follow it. On 12 March, Tai's team received a last-minute notification that Polytechnic University Students' Union couldn't provide room for the polls due to pressure from the university. Tai called it a "political decision". About 65,000 people voted with 96.1 per cent of respondents opposing Carrie Lam, while John Tsang received 91.9 per cent of the votes.

== Final campaign ==
After the election debates and forums, John Tsang further expanded his lead over Carrie Lam in the polls. Tsang continued becoming a social media sensation, posting videos of his supporters from the sectors endorsing him including a clip where he cooked and had meal with his core supporters directed by film director Johnnie To, as well as reading out negative comments made about him, a tactic reminiscent of the popular American show Jimmy Kimmel Live, where celebrities are invited to read mean tweets targeting them. Tsang also met with the general public while campaigning in the streets. On contrary, Lam received largely negative comments on social media. According to analysis by the WiseNews electronic data base, 57.8 per cent of internet comments about Tsang were supportive, with only 10.7 per cent were against him. As for comments on Lam, 83.4 per cent were against her. She was criticised for manipulating the University of Hong Kong’s Emeritus Professor Nelson Chow Wing-sang after posting a video of her visiting elderly people in Sham Shui Po with Chow, despite Chow having not endorsed Lam's candidacy. She was also criticised after one of her campaign staffers said she was "too tired" to make the trip to visit the community in Tin Shui Wai, a New Territories new town with a high proportion of lower-income residents.

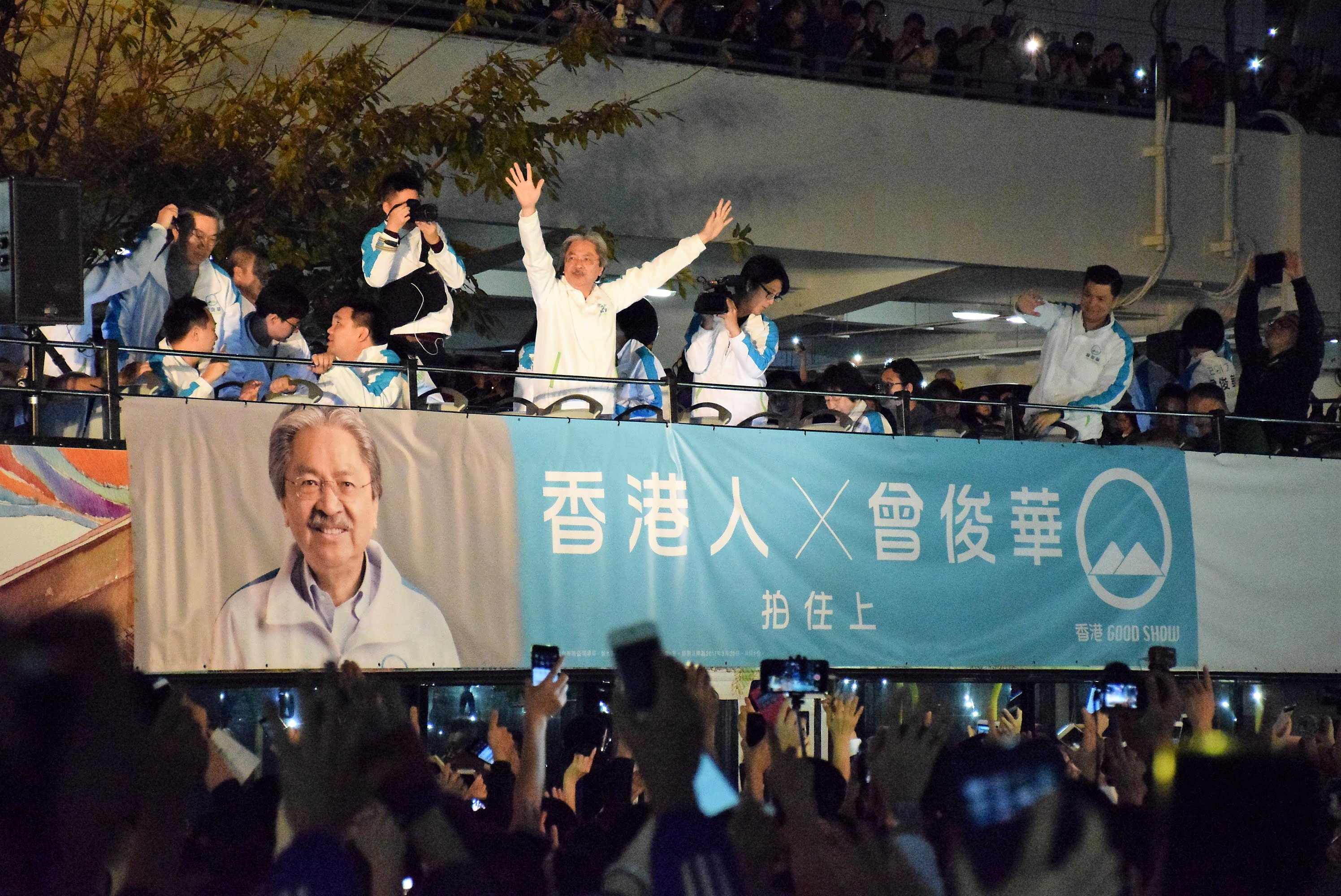
John Tsang held a campaign rally on 24 March in Edinburgh Place, Central which was attended by around 3,500 supporters.

Ahead of the 26 March election, Tsang held a rally on the evening of 24 March at Edinburgh Place, Central, the final stop on his half-day bus parade on Hong Kong Island. Around 3,500 showed support at the rally, while some 449,000 people watched the rally on his Facebook page and more than 18,700 comments were left on the page. Film director Johnnie To, Tsang's wife Lynn and his former political assistant Julian Law Wing-chung were among the six guests who spoke at the rally. In Tsang's speech, he said: "We are here to show our love for this city of ours ... I hope the Election Committee members, who have the power to vote, would heed our call and heal the rift, and make Hong Kong the home we imagined it should be." He also made a reference to the 2014 Occupy protests: "Here we stand near Lung Wo Road and Connaught Road – Occupy happened near this place in more than two years ago, but I hope our rally today can give a new meaning to this place. I hope you will remembere that on 24 March 2017, we gathered here for the unity of Hong Kong."

The rally was held after Tsang faced a fresh round of criticism from veteran Beijing loyalist Lo Man-tuen, who was vice-chairman of the Chinese People's Political Consultative Conference’s (CPPCC) subcommittee on foreign affairs and member of Carrie Lam's campaign office. He accused Tsang of being "an agent of [the] pan-democrats" with United States backing when he chose to ignore Beijing's signals against his running for the Chief Executive. Lo also wrote that Beijing does not trust Tsang because of his "lack of principle on major issues", namely the Occupy protests and 2016 Mong Kok civil unrest. He said Tsang failed to join the Chief Executive and other principal officials in a signature campaign organised by the Alliance for Peace and Democracy against the Occupy Central movement that challenged Beijing's authority" and even expressed appreciation for the local film Ten Years, which was considered a smear on "one country, two systems", in addition to his "laid-back" working style. Chief Executive Leung Chun-ying also slammed his former subordinate's lack of concrete plans for housing.

On 24 March, National People's Congress (NPC) chairman Zhang Dejiang and head of the United Front Work Department Sun Chunlan reportedly arrived in Shenzhen to meet with electors from different sectors to lobby for Lam.

== Opinion polling ==
=== Post-nomination period ===
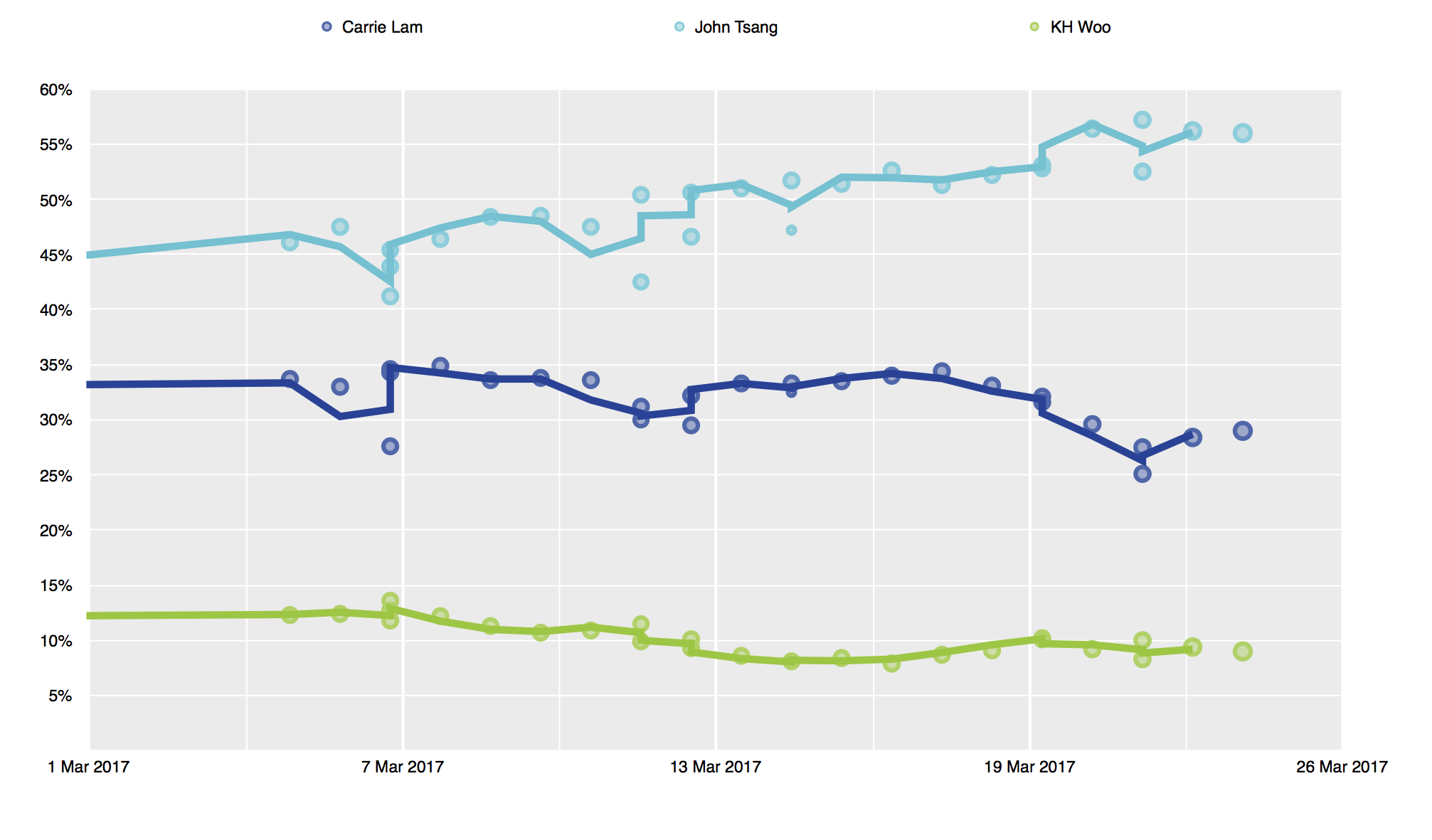

Date(s) conducted	Polling source	Sample size	John Tsang	Carrie Lam	KH Woo	Don't know/ None of above/ Abstain
20–24 Mar 2017	HK01/HKUPOP	1,273	55.6%	29.1%	9.2%	6.0%
19–23 Mar 2017	HK01/HKUPOP	1,188	56.2%	28.4%	9.4%	5.9%
20–22 Mar 2017	LUPGP	1,042	52.5%	25.1%	8.3%	13.9%
18–22 Mar 2017	HK01/HKUPOP	1,119	57.2%	27.5%	10.0%	5.4%
17–21 Mar 2017	HK01/HKUPOP	1,057	56.4%	29.6%	9.2%	4.8%
16–20 Mar 2017	HK01/HKUPOP	1,018	53.1%	31.6%	10.2%	5.0%
16–20 Mar 2017	MP/HKUPOP	1,017	52.8%	32.1%	10.1%	5.1%
15–19 Mar 2017	HK01/HKUPOP	1,024	52.2%	33.1%	9.1%	5.6%
14–18 Mar 2017	HK01/HKUPOP	1,026	51.3%	34.4%	8.7%	5.6%
13–17 Mar 2017	HK01/HKUPOP	1,041	52.6%	34.0%	7.9%	5.6%
12–16 Mar 2017	HK01/HKUPOP	1,027	51.4%	33.5%	8.4%	6.7%
14–15 Mar 2017	nowTV/LUPGP	410	47.2%	32.5%	8.0%	12.0%
11–15 Mar 2017	HK01/HKUPOP	1,019	51.7%	33.3%	8.1%	6.9%
10–14 Mar 2017	HK01/HKUPOP	1,014	51.0%	33.3%	8.6%	7.9%
9–13 Mar 2017	HK01/HKUPOP	1,014	50.7%	32.2%	9.3%	7.9%
8–13 Mar 2017	SCMP/CCPOS	1,009	46.6%	29.5%	10.1%	13.8%
8–12 Mar 2017	nowTV/LUPGP	934	42.5%	30.0%	11.5%	9.0%
8–12 Mar 2017	HK01/HKUPOP	999	50.4%	31.2%	9.9%	8.5%
7–11 Mar 2017	HK01/HKUPOP	1,005	47.5%	33.6%	10.9%	8.0%
6–10 Mar 2017	HK01/HKUPOP	1,010	48.5%	33.8%	10.7%	7.0%
5–9 Mar 2017	HK01/HKUPOP	1,008	48.4%	33.6%	11.3%	6.7%
4–8 Mar 2017	HK01/HKUPOP	1,005	46.4%	34.9%	12.2%	6.6%
3–7 Mar 2017	HK01/HKUPOP	1,004	45.4%	34.6%	13.6%	6.4%
2–3, 5–7 Mar 2017	HKEJ/CCPOS	1,018	41.2%	34.3%	11.8%	12.8%
1–7 Mar 2017	Future@HK/LUPGP	1,014	43.9%	27.6%	12.7%	15.8%
2–6 Mar 2017	HK01/HKUPOP	1,025	47.5%	33.0%	12.4%	7.1%
1–5 Mar 2017	HK01/HKUPOP	1,027	46.1%	33.7%	12.3%	7.9%

=== Before nomination period ends ===
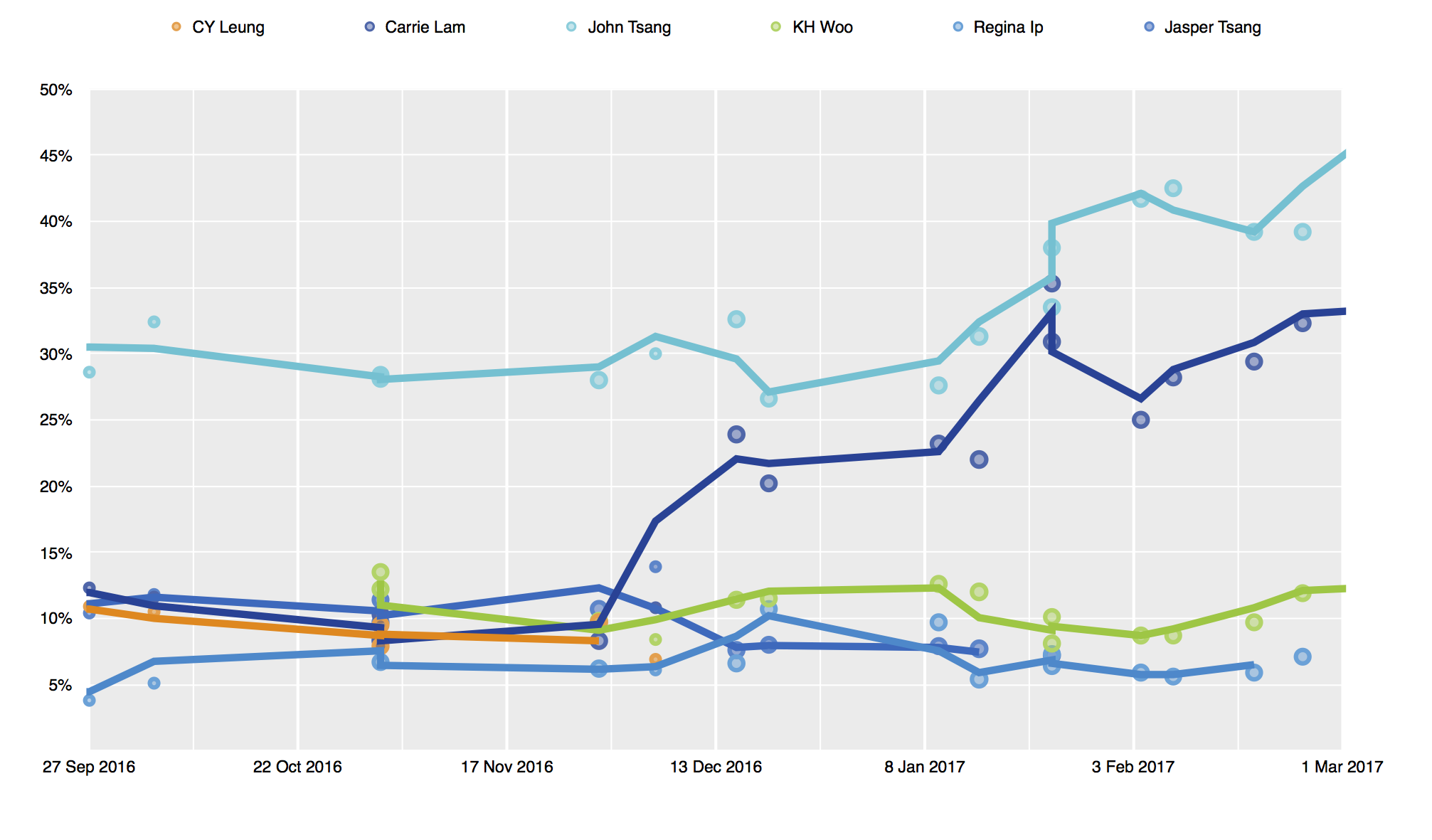

Date(s) conducted	Polling source	Sample size	John Tsang	Carrie Lam	KH Woo	Regina Ip	KH Leung	Jasper Tsang	CY Leung	Antony Leung	Norman Chan	Others	Don't know/ None of above/ Abstain
20–24 Feb 2017	MP/HKUPOP	1,006	39.2%	32.3%	11.9%	7.1%	–	–	–	–	–	–	9.5%
14–18 Feb 2017	nowTV/LUPGP	1,010	39.2%	29.4%	9.7%	5.9%	2.6%	–	–	–	–	–	13.1%
2–8 Feb 2017	SCMP/CCPOS	~1,000	42.5%	28.2%	8.7%	5.6%	–	–	–	–	–	–	15.0%
1–4 Feb 2017	nowTV/LUPGP	1,023	41.7%	25.0%	8.7%	5.9%	–	–	–	–	–	–	18.7%
19–24 Jan 2017	MP/HKUPOP	1,005	38.0%	35.3%	10.1%	7.3%	–	–	–	–	–	–	9.3%
18–20, 23–24 Jan 2017	HKEJ/CCPOS	1,036	33.5%	30.9%	8.1%	6.4%	–	7.2%	–	–	–	–	13.9%
12–15 Jan 2017	nowTV/LUPGP	1,103	31.3%	22.0%	12.0%	5.4%	–	7.7%	–	–	–	–	21.6%
4–10 Jan 2017	SCMP/CCPOS	1,024	27.6%	23.2%	12.6%	9.7%	–	7.9%	–	–	–	–	19.0%
16–20 Dec 2016	nowTV/LUPGP	1,007	26.6%	20.2%	11.5%	10.7%	–	8.0%	–	–	–	–	23.0%
12–16 Dec 2016	HKEJ/CCPOS	1,032	32.6%	23.9%	11.4%	6.6%	–	7.6%	–	–	–	–	18.0%
5–6 Dec 2016	HK01/HKUPOP	516	30.0%	10.8%	8.4%	6.1%	–	13.9%	6.9%	5.8%	0.5%	4.5%	13.1%
24–29 Nov 2016	nowTV/LUPGP	1,052	28.0%	8.3%	9.8%	6.2%	–	10.7%	9.7%	–	–	–	27.3%
28 Oct–2 Nov 2016	nowTV/LUPGP	1,020	28.1%	8.3%	12.2%	6.7%	–	9.7%	7.9%	–	–	–	26.5%
26 Oct–2 Nov 2016	HKEJ/CCPOS	1,005	28.4%	10.3%	13.5%	8.4%	–	11.4%	9.5%	–	–	–	18.5%
3–5 Oct 2016	Initium/CCPOS	521	32.4%	11.6%	–	5.1%	–	11.8%	10.5%	14.1%	–	–	14.5%
26–27 Sep 2016	HK01/HKUPOP	513	28.6%	12.3%	–	3.8%	–	10.4%	10.9%	7.1%	0.6%	7.5%	19.0%
23 January 2016	HK01/HKUPOP	522	20%	16%	–	5%	–	5%	8%	8%	0%	17%	19%

=== Two-way contest ===
Date(s) conducted	Polling source	Sample size	John Tsang	Carrie Lam	Don't know/ None of above/ Abstain
14–18 Feb 2017	nowTV/LUPGP	1,010	53.6%	33.0%	13.4%
1–4 Feb 2017	nowTV/LUPGP	1,023	53.6%	31.2%	15.3%
18–20, 23–24 Jan 2017	HKEJ/CCPOS	1,036	48.7%	39.9%	11.5%

== Voting intentions ==
Some 98 per cent of the 325-member "Democrats 300+" coalition, consisting of around 290 votes, decided on voting for John Tsang as he was the most popular candidate in the polls, many of whom supported Woo Kwok-hing in the nomination period including the 11 Progressive Engineering electors. The pro-democracy parties Civic Party and Democratic Party also decided to vote for Tsang. The 24 pro-democracy legislators also issued a statement saying they had "no basis of mutual trust" with Carrie Lam. Liberal Party honorary chairwoman Selina Chow also declared her backing for Tsang, while the other party honorary chairman James Tien had been the most vocal supporter of Tsang since the beginning of the election.

Hong Kong's richest man and an influential figure in the Hong Kong business circle Li Ka-shing and his sons Victor Li and Richard Li, previously believed to be Tsang supporters, reportedly shared a meal with National People's Congress chairman Zhang Dejiang in Shenzhen where Zhang persuaded the Lis to back Carrie Lam. Richard Li subsequently endorsed Lam in an interview published in three Chinese-language newspapers – Ming Pao, Hong Kong Economic Journal and Wen Wei Po. Li Ka-shing, following his son, broke his silence to express support for Carrie Lam, saying he would vote for a candidate trusted by Beijing. He said he was optimistic that the split in the city could be healed, like the Chinese goddess Nüwa who mended the heaven with coloured stones.

Pro-Beijing sectors such as 60-seat Agriculture and Fisheries and 26-seat Heung Yee Kuk which nominated Lam declared they would also vote for Lam in the final election. 14 electors of the 15-member Performing Arts sub-subsector, except for Derek Yee who nominated Tsang, decided to vote for Lam. The largest pro-Beijing party Democratic Alliance for the Betterment and Progress of Hong Kong (DAB) also endorsed Lam in the final election. The Hong Kong Federation of Trade Unions (FTU), although refused to nominate Lam for her unsatisfying labour policies, decided they would all vote for Lam. Financial Services elector Ricky Chim Kim-lun who nominated Tsang switched side to Lam a day before the election, endorsing Lam with 16 other electors of the subsector. Another Tsang supporter, Thomas Wu, son of tycoon Gordon Wu of the Hopewell Holdings also reportedly decided to vote for Lam. One day before the election, Lam had already looked assured of winning on paper, by securing about 750 ballots from the 1,194-member Election Committee.

== Results ==
The election was held at the Grand Hall, 3/F, Hong Kong Convention and Exhibition Centre (HKCEC) from 9 to 11 a.m. on 26 March 2017. Carrie Lam became the first female Chief Executive by winning 777 votes in the 1,194-member Election Committee, 197 votes more than the nominations she received from the EC and 88 more votes than Leung Chun-ying's 689 votes from the last election. She also became the first Chief Executive elected without being the most popular candidate and the first to be graduated from the University of Hong Kong (HKU). John Tsang received 365 votes, 200 more than he received in the nomination period. Woo Kwok-hing received only 21 votes, receiving the lowest votes a Chief Executive candidate ever had. The turnout rate was 99.33 per cent. Of the 1,186 ballots cast, 19 were blank votes and four ballots were spoilt. Eight electors did not cast their votes.

26 March 2017 Hong Kong Chief Executive election results
Party	Candidate	Votes	%	±%
Nonpartisan	Carrie Lam	777	55.81	
Nonpartisan	John Tsang	365	31.38	
Nonpartisan	Woo Kwok-hing	21	1.81	
Total votes		1,163	100	
Total valid votes		1,163	98.06	
Rejected ballots		23	1.94	
Turnout		1,186	99.33	+4.44
Registered electors		1,194		

== Aftermath ==
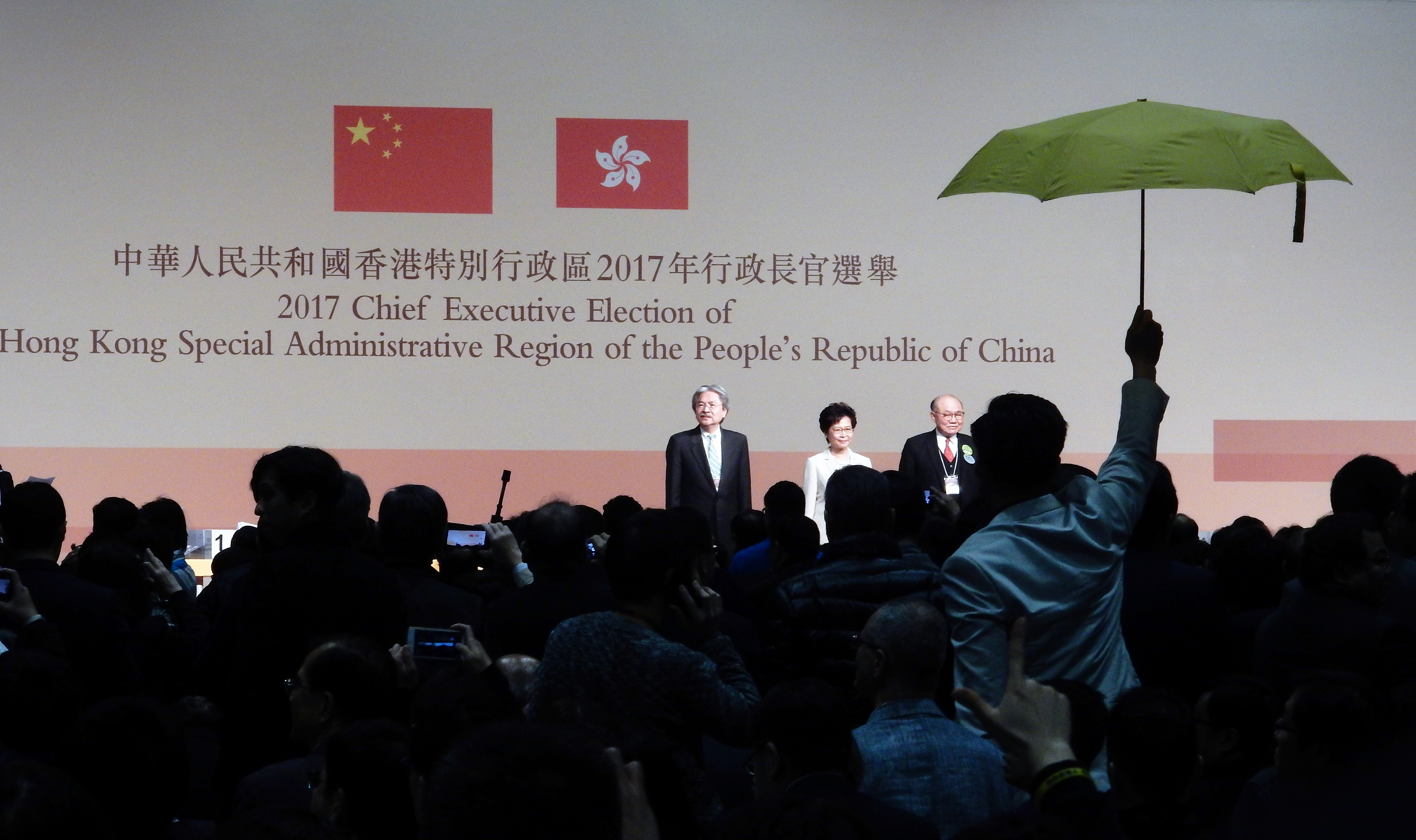
Pro-democracy electors protested at the polling venue with a yellow umbrella, representing the Umbrella Movement.

After the announcement of Lam winning with 777 votes, citizens ridiculed the number on social media as the word "seven" in Cantonese, pronounced as tsat, is often used as a vulgar term associated with stupidity. Some pro-democracy members of the Election Committee protested in the Hong Kong Convention and Exhibition Centre (HKCEC) and demanded genuine universal suffrage. Organised by the Civil Human Rights Front, around 200 protesters also gathered outside the venue protested against the "small-circle election". A group of protesters from People Power proceeded to protest outside of the Liaison Office.

There was also a counter-protest of about 1,200 pro-Beijing supporters clad in red outside the HKCEC to voice their support for Lam and the government. Many of them mingled and chatted in Mandarin and various dialects, displaying banners bearing the names of the organisers, the residents associations of their mainland home cities, such as Guangzhou, Xiamen and Shanwei. A Cable TV news programme filmed many of these pro-government protesters being paid to attend the rally.

At the AsiaWorld-Expo, the unused backup polling station, two notebook computers storing the name list of the 1,194 Election Committee members and personal data of all 3.78 million registered voters were reported as lost. The incident was investigated by the police as theft, but the whereabouts of the lost computers remained unknown. The Registration and Electoral Office (REO) posted letters of apology to all affected voters, stating the personal data was "protected by multiple encryptions" which were "extremely difficult to break through". Nevertheless, the Office of the Privacy Commissioner for Personal Data received more than 900 complaints in the following days. When questioned by legislators, Chief Electoral Officer Wong See-man explained that the full database was to confirm the eligibility of the 1,194 electors and admitted that the computers were left unattended.

One day after the election, the Department of Justice charged nine Occupy protests leaders of public nuisance offences, including the three Occupy Central founders – academics Benny Tai and Chan Kin-man, and Reverend Chu Yiu-ming, legislators Tanya Chan and Shiu Ka-chun, former student leaders Tommy Cheung Sau-yin and Eason Chung Yiu-wah, League of Social Democrats (LSD) vice-chairman Raphael Wong and former legislator Lee Wing-tat. Asked if the prosecutions would embarrass Chief Executive-elect Lam – who said her top task was to heal the social divide in her victory speech – incumbent Leung Chun-ying reiterated that the decision was independently made by the Department of Justice.

After the election, the chairs of the Congressional-Executive Commission on China of the U.S. Congress, Senator Marco Rubio and Representative Christopher Smith, issued a critical statement, warning that Beijing's clear interference in the election demonstrated the precipitous erosion of Hong Kong's autonomy. "If Hong Kong is to become just another mainland Chinese city under the new Chief Executive's leadership, we will have to reassess whether Hong Kong warrants special status under U.S. law," the statement said.

Lam received the appointment from Chinese Premier Li Keqiang on 11 April 2017. She was sworn in by General Secretary of the Communist Party and President Xi Jinping, on 1 July 2017, the 20th anniversary of the establishment of the Special Administrative Region.

== See also ==
- Carrie Lam as Chief Executive of Hong Kong
- Democratic development in Hong Kong

== Notes ==
1–4. The parties' nominations were unbundled.
5. Other candidates included Audrey Eu (11%), Frederick Ma (3%) and Bernard Chan (1%).
