= Yuen Lung (constituency) =

Hong Kong constituency

- Elected constituency for the Yuen Long District Council
- Boundary of Yuen Lung in Yuen Long District
- District: Yuen Long
- Legislative Council constituency: New Territories North West
- Population: 13,761 (2019)
- Electorate: 7,135 (2019)

Current constituency
- Created: 2015
- Number of members: One
- Member: Vacant
- Created from: Fung Cheung; Yuen Long Centre

Yuen Lung (Chinese: 元龍) is one of the 39 constituencies in the Yuen Long District of Hong Kong.

The constituency returns one district councillor to the Yuen Long District Council, with an election every four years.

Yuen Lung constituency is loosely based on southeastern part of Yuen Long Town, covering Sun Yuen Long Centre and YOHO Town with estimated population of 13,959.

== Councillors represented ==
Election	Member	Party
2015	Wong Wai-shun	NPP
2019	Wong Wai-shun	BPA
2019	Tommy Cheung Sau-yin →Vacant (Note: Resigned on 22 October 2021 for health reasons.)	Nonpartisan

== Election results ==
=== 2010s ===
Yuen Long District Council Election, 2019: Yuen Lung
Party	Candidate	Votes	%	±%
Nonpartisan	Cheung Sau-yin	3,177	58.13	
BPA	Wong Wai-shun	2,281	41.74	−46.24
Nonpartisan	Eric Chow Lok-ning	7	0.13	
Majority		896	16.39	
Turnout		5,480	76.83	
Nonpartisan gain from BPA		Swing		

Yuen Long District Council Election, 2015: Yuen Lung
Party	Candidate	Votes	%	±%
NPP	Wong Wai-shun	2,651	88.0	
BPA	Chong Kin-shing	362	12.0	
Majority		2,289	76.0	
Turnout		3,285	54.2	
NPP win (new seat)				
