= 2016 Hong Kong Election Committee Subsector elections =

2016 Election Committee subsector elections
- 11 December 2016

1,034 (of the 1,200) seats in the Election Committee 601 seats needed for a majority
- Registered: 246,440 ▼1.21%
- Turnout: 107,841 (46.53%) ▲18.93pp
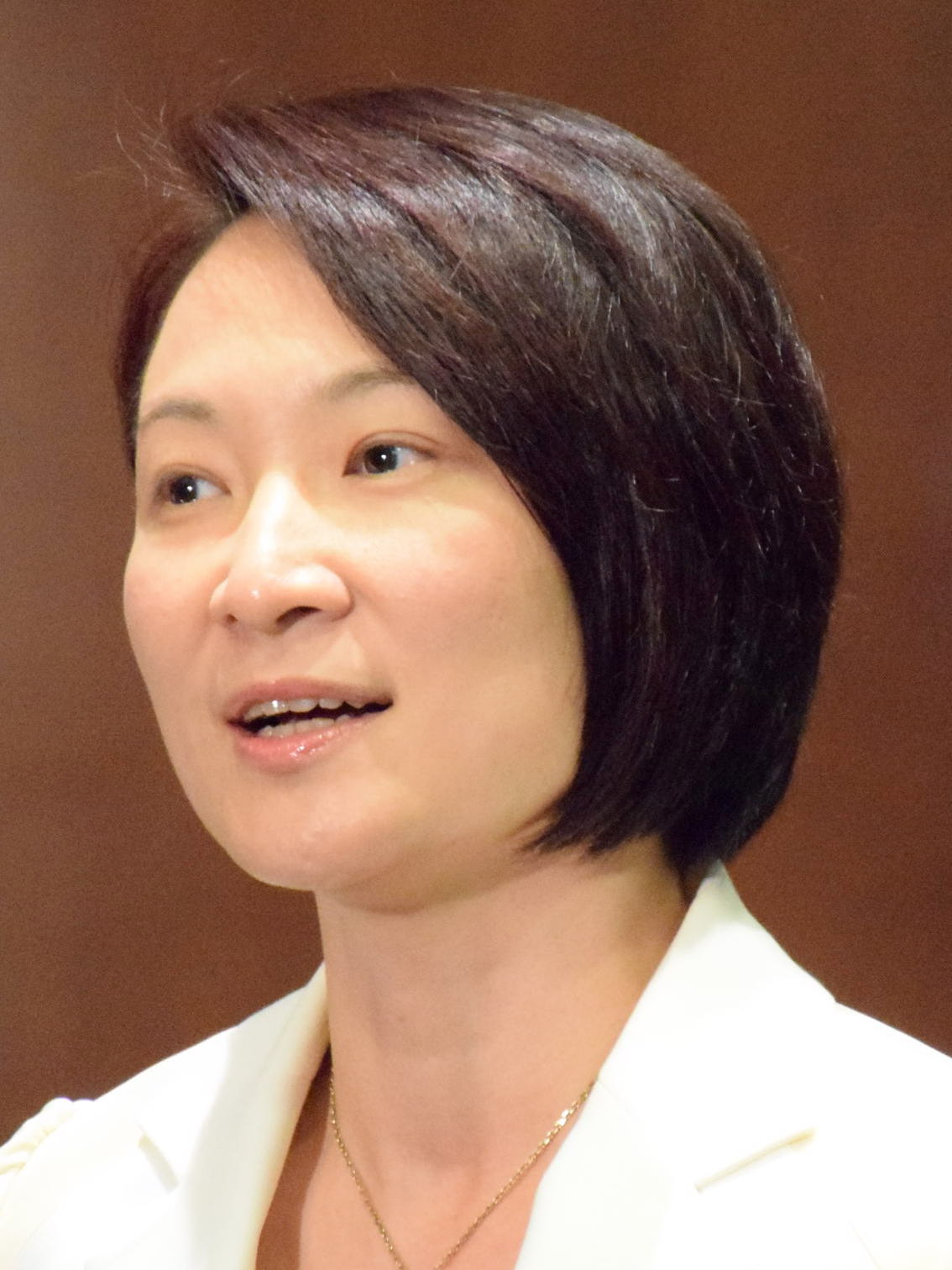

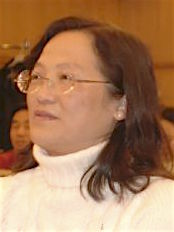

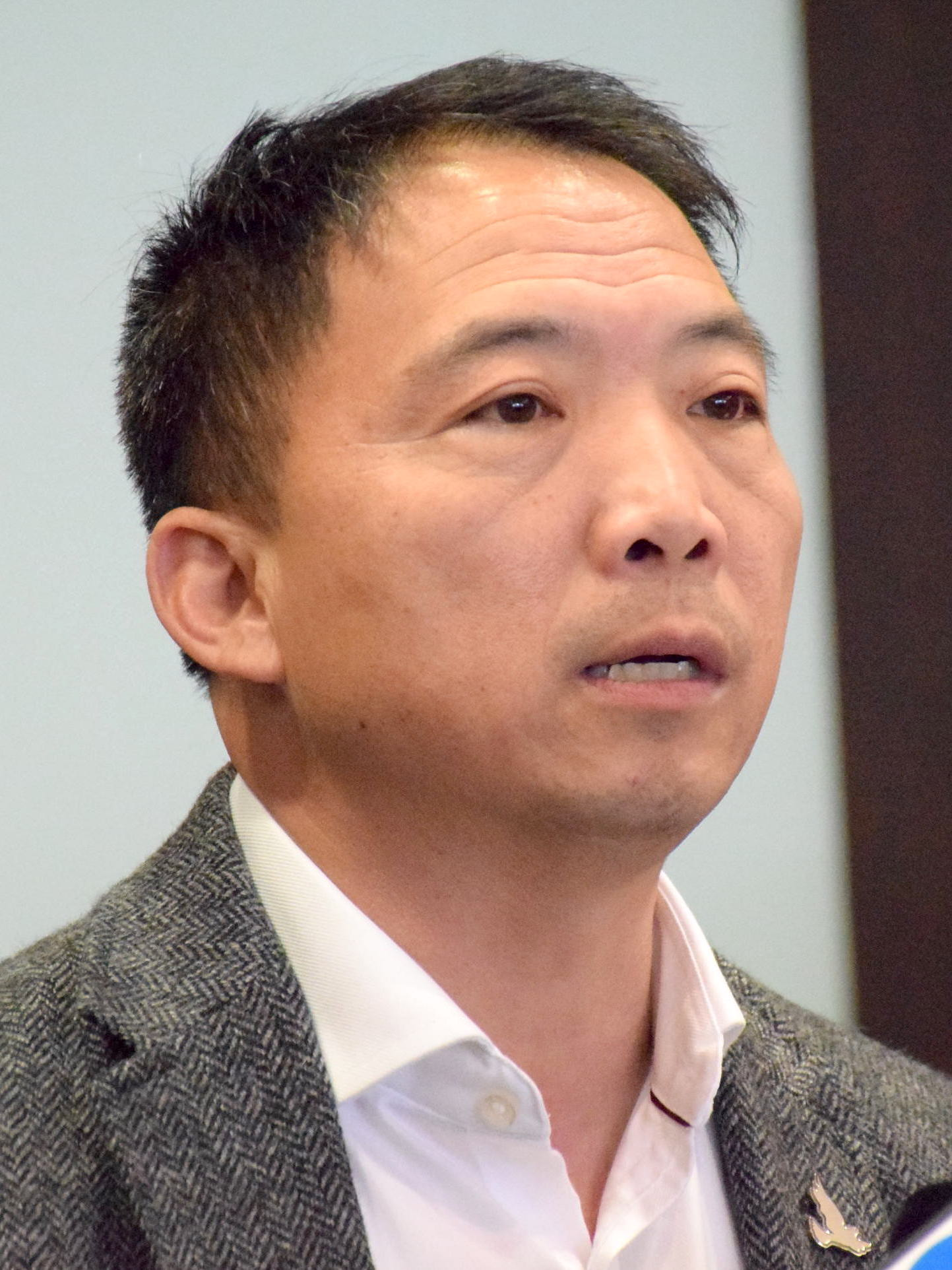

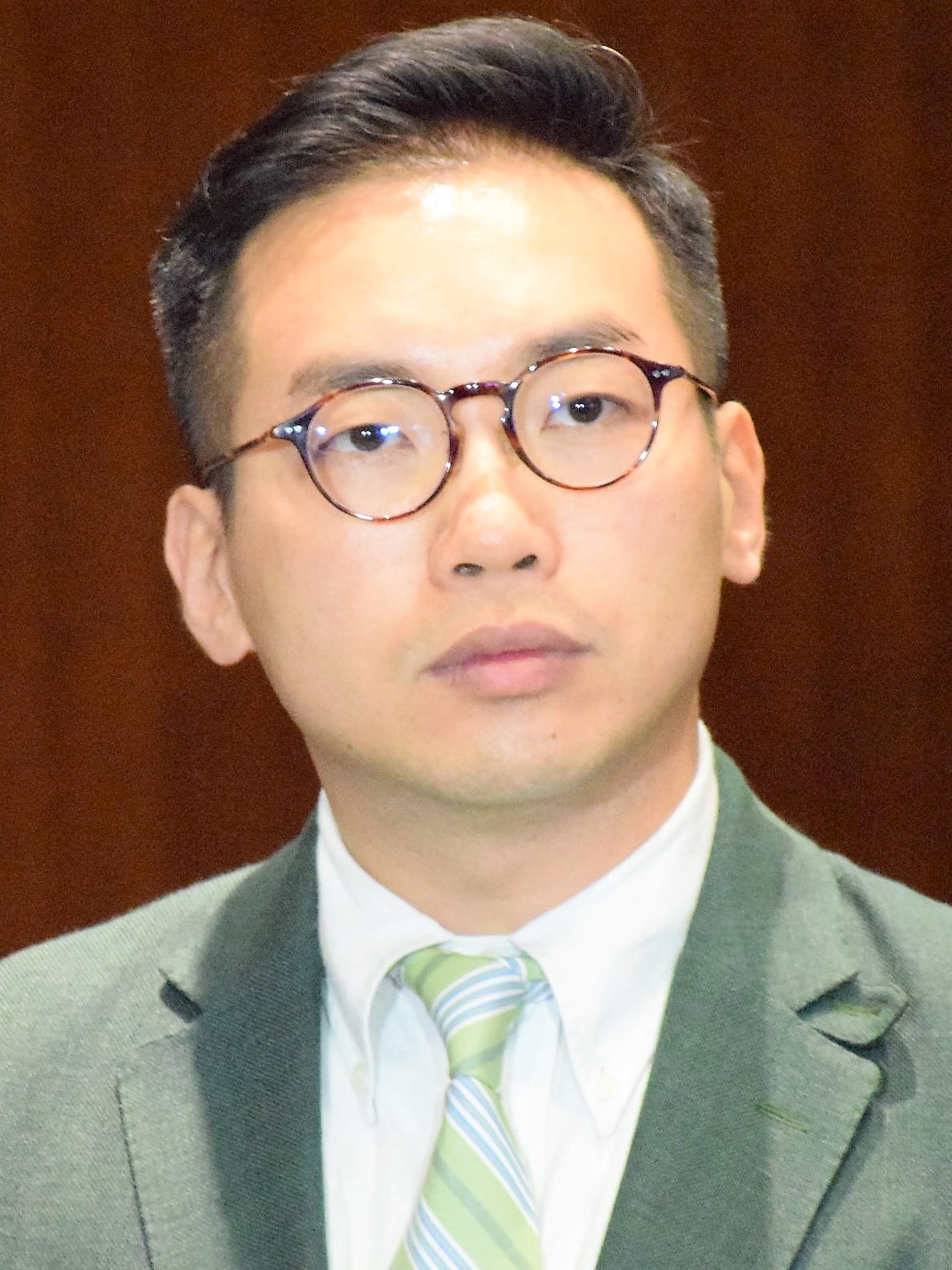

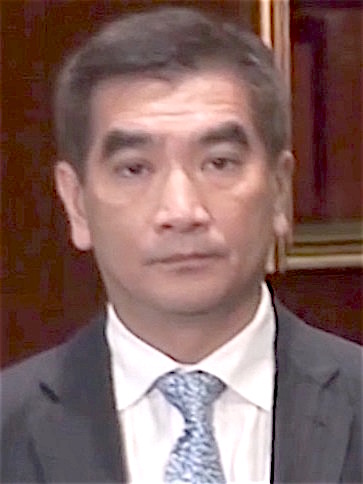

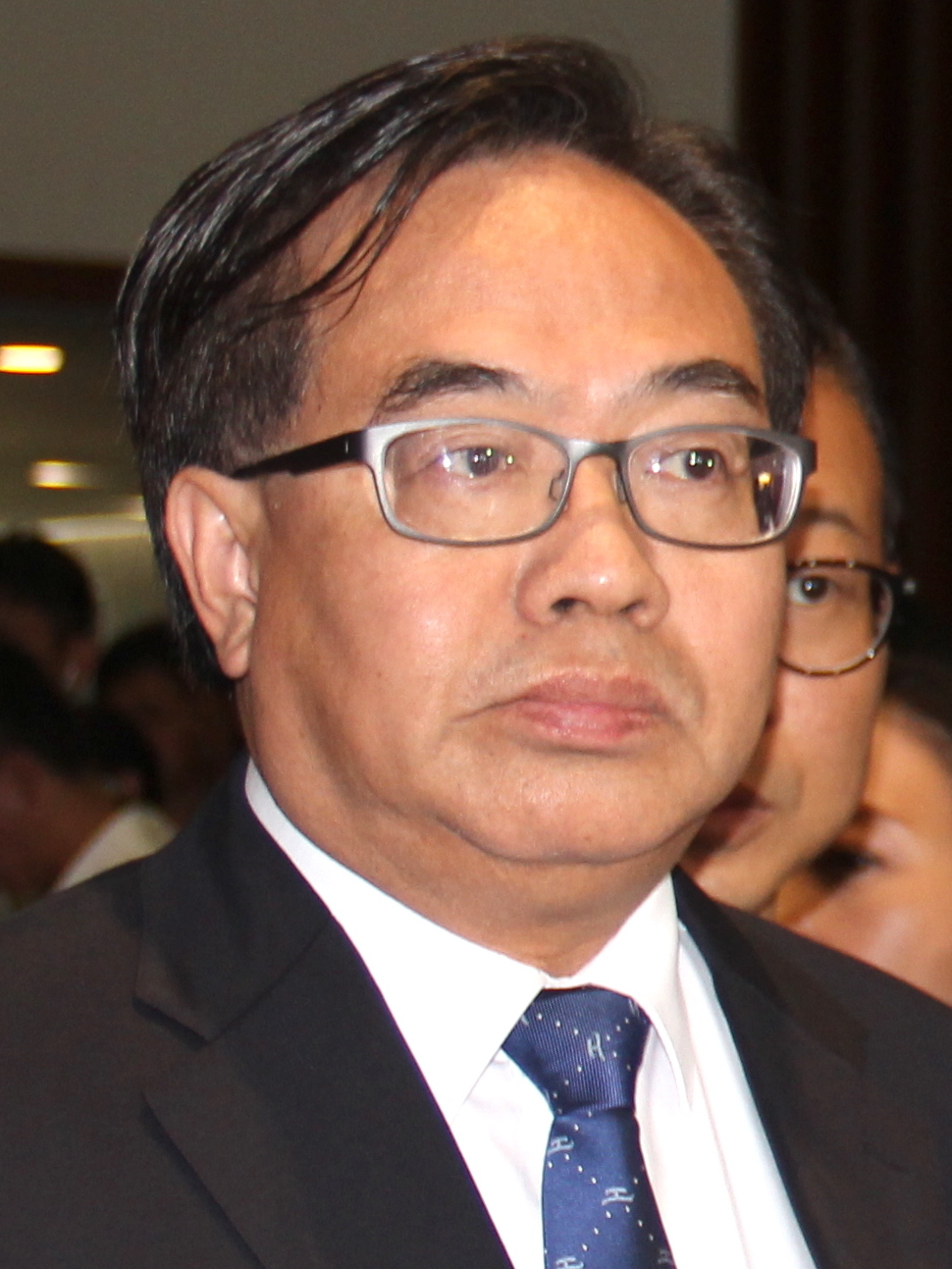
	First party	Second party	Third party
Leader	Starry Lee	Lam Shuk-yee	Wu Chi-wai
Party	DAB	FTU	Democratic
Alliance	Pro-Beijing	Pro-Beijing	Democrats 300+
Seats won	53	44	15
	Fourth party	Fifth party	Sixth party
Leader	Alvin Yeung	Felix Chung	Lo Wai-kwok
Party	Civic	Liberal	BPA
Alliance	Democrats 300+	Pro-Beijing	Pro-Beijing
Seats won	14	13	10

The 2016 Election Committee subsector elections were held on 11 December 2016 for 1,034 of the 1,200 members of the Election Committee (EC) which is responsible for electing the Chief Executive of Hong Kong (CE) in the 2017 election.

Although incumbent Chief Executive Leung Chun-ying announced, two days before the election, that he would not be standing, the pro-democrats, whose campaign theme was opposition to Leung serving a second term, won a record quarter of the seats on the EC under the banner of "Democrats 300+" on a nearly 20 per cent surge in turnout over 2011.

== Background ==
The pro-democracy camp pocketed 205 seats in the 1,200-strong Election Committee and nominated Albert Ho of the Democratic Party to run against Leung Chun-ying and Henry Tang in 2012. The main goal for the pro-democrats in this election was to grab more than 300 seats to increase the chance of blocking the incumbent Chief Executive Leung Chun-ying to re-elected. In order to do that, the camp tended not to send a candidate in the election and become a "kingmaker" by boosting the chance for an alternative establishment candidate.

The six pro-democrats elected to the Legislative Council in functional constituencies in September, including Edward Yiu who took the seat in the traditional pro-Beijing sector and Leung Chun-ying's stronghold Architectural, Surveying, Planning and Landscape, formed an alliance called the Professionals Guild to coordinate candidates to contest in the Election Committee election. The victory in the Legislative Council functional constituencies encouraged the pro-democrats to take a more progressive strategy in the professional sector, in which the pro-democrats traditionally had more advantages. The pro-democrat professionals and activists also formed a loose coalition called "Democrats 300+" hoping to snatch over 300 seats in the committee.

Some 300 candidates had also voiced opposition towards Leung Chun-ying re-election. Only 189 out of 305 of those who nominated Leung in 2012 sought to join the Election Committee this year. On 9 December, two days before the election, Leung announced he would not seek re-election, citing family reasons.

== Composition ==
The Election Committee consisted of 1,034 members elected from 35 subsectors, 60 members nominated by the Religious subsector and 106 ex officio members. (Hong Kong deputies from the National People's Congress and Legislative Council of Hong Kong members). As the term of office commenced on 1 February 2016, the 1,200 member Election Committee was formed by 38 Election Committee Subsectors:

1. Heung Yee Kuk (26)
2. Agriculture and Fisheries (60)
3. Insurance (18)
4. Transport (18)
5. Education (30)
6. Legal (30)
7. Accountancy (30)
8. Medical (30)
9. Health Services (30)
10. Engineering (30)
11. Architectural, Surveying and Planning (30)
12. Labour (60)
13. Social Welfare (60)
14. Real Estate and Construction (18)
15. Tourism (18)
16. Commercial (First) (18)
17. Commercial (Second) (18)
18. Industrial (First) (18)
19. Industrial (Second) (18)
20. Finance (18)
21. Financial Services (18)
22. Sports, Performing Arts, Culture and Publication (60)
23. Import and Export (18)
24. Textiles and Garment (18)
25. Wholesale and Retail (18)
26. Information Technology (30)
27. Higher Education (30)
28. Hotel (17)
29. Catering (17)
30. Chinese Medicine (30)
31. Chinese People's Political Consultative Conference (51)
32. Employers' Federation of HK (16)
33. HK and Kowloon District Councils (57)
34. New Territories District Councils (60)
35. HK Chinese Enterprises Association (16)
36. National People's Congress (36)
37. Legislative Council (70)
38. Religious (60)

Note: Figures in brackets denotes the number of members.

Number of members nominated by the six designated bodies of the religious subsector:

- Catholic Diocese of Hong Kong (10 members)
- Chinese Muslim Cultural and Fraternal Association (10 members)
- Hong Kong Christian Council (10 members)
- The Hong Kong Taoist Association (10 members)
- The Confucian Academy (10 members)
- The Hong Kong Buddhist Association (10 members)

== Nominations ==
The nomination period was from 8 to 14 November 2016. A total number of 1,539 nominations were validated, while ten nominations were ruled invalid by the Returning Officers which included the former Chinese University of Hong Kong Students' Union president Tommy Cheung Sau-yin who led the seven-member "Student United 2017" and six members of the pro-democratic "Progressive Engineering" due to their "insufficient connection" with the Higher Education and Engineering subsectors.

One nomination from the 18-member Import and Export subsector was also invalidated, which made the number of the nominated candidates of the Import and Export subsector one less than the number of seats allocated to it. Since there was no provision in the Chief Executive Election Ordinance which allowed a by-election to fill the remaining seat, the seat would be vacant.

Among the 1,539 candidates, 300 of those were returned uncontested and voting for the 12 subsectors and the Sports sub-subsector would not be held. For the six designated bodies of the religious subsector, four of them were uncontested. The Returning Officer arranged lots drawing for the Catholic Diocese of Hong Kong and the Hong Kong Christian Council in order to decide members of the Election Committee among the nominees.

== Election results ==
=== Results by subsector ===
Statistics are generated from the official election website:

Sector	Sub-sector	Registered voters	Candidates	Elected	Votes	Turnout
I	Catering	5,530	17	17	uncontested	
I	Commercial (First)	1,045	19	18	605	60.20
I	Commercial (Second)	1,460	18	18	uncontested	
I	Employers' Federation of Hong Kong	139	16	16	uncontested	
I	Finance	122	18	18	uncontested	
I	Financial Services	622	33	18	440	74.45
I	Hong Kong Chinese Enterprises Association	308	16	16	uncontested	
I	Hotel	120	19	17	102	85.00
I	Import and Export	1,379	17*	17*	uncontested	
I	Industrial (First)	542	18	18	uncontested	
I	Industrial (Second)	764	18	18	uncontested	
I	Insurance	131	29	18	94	78.33
I	Real Estate and Construction	706	18	18	uncontested	
I	Textiles and Garment	2,330	18	18	uncontested	
I	Tourism	1,298	25	18	724	59.20
I	Transport	195	24	18	159	82.81
I	Wholesale and Retail	6,706	21	18	2,118	32.45
I	Sub-total for First Sector	23,397	344	299	4,242	41.93
II	Accountancy	26,001	62	30	12,296	47.29
II	Architectural, Surveying and Planning	7,370	92	30	4,634	62.88
II	Chinese Medicine	6,143	55	30	2,615	42.57
II	Education	80,643	56	30	33,688	41.77
II	Engineering	9,405	58	30	5,506	58.54
II	Health Services	37,387	94	30	13,154	35.18
II	Higher Education	7,497	65	30	3,850	51.35
II	Information Technology	12,109	59	30	7,605	62.93
II	Legal	6,769	37	30	3,664	54.13
II	Medical	11,189	85	30	6,121	54.71
II	Sub-total for Second Sector	204,513	663	300	93,133	45.54
III	Agriculture and Fisheries	154	60	60	uncontested	
III	Labour	668	69	60	471	74.76
III	Religious	N/A	60	60	no election	
III	Social Welfare	14,130	104	60	7,826	55.44
III	Sports, Performing Arts, Culture and Publication	2,909	85	60	1,650	75.69
III	Sub-total for Third Sector	17,861	378	300	9,947	58.59
IV	National People's Congress	N/A	36	36	ex officio	
IV	Legislative Council	N/A	70	70	ex officio	
IV	Chinese People's Political Consultative Conference	91	51	51	uncontested	
IV	Heung Yee Kuk	147	35	26	133	90.48
IV	Hong Kong and Kowloon District Councils	208	66	57	199	95.67
IV	New Territories District Councils	223	62	60	187	83.86
IV	Sub-total for Fourth Sector	669	320	300	519	77.58
	TOTAL	246,440	1,705	1,199	107,841	46.53

Note: *One nomination from the 18-member Import and Export subsector was invalidated, which made the number of the nominated candidates of the Import and Export subsector one less than the number of seats allocated to it. Since there was no provision in the Chief Executive Election Ordinance which allowed a by-election to fill the remaining seat, the seat would be vacant.

=== Results by affiliation ===
Summary of the 11 December 2016 Election Committee Subsector election results
Affiliation	1st Sector		2nd Sector		3rd Sector		4th Sector		Total	
Affiliation	Standing	Elected	Standing	Elected	Standing	Elected	Standing	Elected	Standing	Elected
Democratic Alliance for the Betterment and Progress of Hong Kong	6	5	-	-	-	-	48	48	54	53
Hong Kong Federation of Trade Unions	-	-	-	-	35	33	11	11	46	44
Liberal Party	12	11	-	-	-	-	2	2	14	13
Business and Professionals Alliance for Hong Kong	2	2	-	-	-	-	8	8	10	10
New People's Party	1	1	-	-	-	-	9	8	10	9
Federation of Hong Kong and Kowloon Labour Unions	-	-	-	-	8	8	1	1	9	9
ABC.P.A	-	-	5	4	-	-	-	-	5	4
New Territories Association of Societies	-	-	-	-	-	-	2	2	2	2
Chinese Association of Hong Kong & Macao Studies	1	1	-	-	-	-	-	-	1	1
V18 Accountants	-	-	18	0	-	-	-	-	18	0
Gov.ALPS	-	-	11	0	-	-	-	-	11	0
Education Convergence	-	-	5	0	-	-	-	-	5	0
Your Vote Counts	-	-	4	0	-	-	-	-	4	0
Hong Kong Securities & Futures Employees Union	1	0	-	-	-	-	-	-	1	0
Hong Kong Women Teachers' Organization	-	-	1	0	-	-	-	-	1	0
Win Win Hong Kong Accountants	-	-	1	0	-	-	-	-	1	0
Pro-Beijing Independent	319	279	301	53	156	137	123	114	898	581
Total for pro-Beijing camp	342	299	345	57	199	178	204	194	1,091	726
Health Professionals for Democracy 30	-	-	29	29	-	-	-	-	29	29
Hong Kong Professional Teachers' Union	-	-	23	23	-	-	-	-	23	23
Hong Kong Social Workers' General Union	-	-	-	-	20	20	-	-	20	20
Doctors for Democracy	-	-	19	19	-	-	-	-	19	19
Demo-Social Front	-	-	-	-	19	19	-	-	19	19
Democratic Party	1	0	12	12	3	3	2	0	18	15
IT Vision	-	-	16	16	-	-	-	-	16	16
Civic Party	-	-	14	14	-	-	2	0	16	14
Together for Social Welfare	-	-	-	-	18	13	-	-	18	13
O Superpower	-	-	-	-	11	4	-	-	11	4
Democrat Professionals Hong Kong	-	-	4	4	-	-	-	-	4	4
Hearts of Accountants	-	-	4	4	-	-	-	-	4	4
Professional Commons	-	-	2	2	-	-	-	-	2	2
Reclaiming Social Work Movement	-	-	-	-	12	1	-	-	12	1
Hong Kong Association for Democracy and People's Livelihood	-	-	1	1	-	-	3	0	4	1
Labour Party	-	-	1	1	-	-	1	0	2	1
Coalition of Hong Kong Newspaper and Magazine Merchant	1	0	-	-	-	-	-	-	1	0
Independent democrats	-	-	119	114	15	0	1	0	135	114
Total for Democrats 300+	2	0	243	238	100	60	9	0	352	298
Frontline Doctors' Union	-	-	3	3	-	-	-	-	3	3
Students United 2017	-	-	6	0	-	-	-	-	6	0
User Voice	-	-	-	-	3	0	-	-	3	0
Path of Democracy	-	-	1	0	-	-	-	-	1	0
Tuen Mun Community Network	-	-	-	-	1	0	-	-	1	0
Alliance of Housing Department Staff Unions	-	-	-	-	1	0	-	-	1	0
Non-aligned independent	-	-	64	2	16	2	1	0	81	4
Total	344	299	663	300	318	240	214	194	1,539	1,033

== Overview of outcome ==
Seats, of total, by camp
1. Pro-Beijing (66.9%)
2. Pro-democrats (27.2%)
3. Other (5.86%)

The election saw a nearly 20 percent point increase of turnout compared to the 2011 election. The pro-democracy camp took a record quarter of the seat in the elections, with the help of the landslide victories in the Second sector. Clean sweeps were seen in the Legal, Education, Higher Education, Health Services, Information Technology and Social Welfare subsectors, as well as victories in other subsectors. The pro-democrats under the banner of "Democrats 300+" won 325 seats in total if included the 27 ex officio Legislative Council members.

=== First sector ===
The pro-Beijing camp maintained its stronghold in the First sector. Liberal Party honorary chairman James Tien, key advocate of the so-called "ABC" – Anyone But CY Leung – campaign, received high votes in the Commercial (First) subsector along with his mentee Joseph Chan Ho-lim, each bagging more than 400 votes from corporate electors. Liberal Party chairman Tommy Cheung, Legislative Council member for the Catering functional constituency also had his 17-member candidate list elected uncontestedly in the Catering subsector. Vincent Fang, the party ex-leader and former Wholesale and Retail LegCo representative also won all 18 seats against a two-member list led by Democratic Party's Au Nok-hin.

The most prominent estate developing tycoons were elected through the Real Estate and Construction subsector, including Li Ka-shing, Lee Shau-kee, Gordon Wu and Ronnie Chan who were elected uncontestedly. The Hotel subsector was dominated by property developers. Among the 17 elected members were Gary Harilela, director of Harilela Hotels, Lui Che-woo, founder of K. Wah Group, and second-generation tycoons including Sino Land's Daryl Ng, Hopewell Holdings' Thomas Wu, and Henderson Land Development's Martin Lee Ka-shing.

=== Second sector ===
The pro-democrats scored landslide victories in the professional subsectors. The Academics in Support of Democracy ticket led by Occupy Central co-founders Chan Kin-man and Benny Tai seized all the seats in the Higher Education subsector. The two tickets led by pro-democrat politicians including Civic Party's Alan Leong and legal scholar Eric Cheung Tat-ming also won all the 30 seats in the Legal subsector. The other subsectors swept by the pro-democrats included Education and Information Technology subsector in which former Democratic Party legislators Cheung Man-kwong and Sin Chung-kai became the biggest winners.

The pro-democrats saw increase of their seats in the Architectural, Surveying, Planning and Landscape and the Accountancy subsectors, and secured at least half of the seats in the Engineering and Medical subsectors. The three pro-democrat candidates who were under the banner of the "Democrats 300+" were also elected in the traditional pro-Beijing stronghold of Chinese Medicine subsector for the first time.

=== Third sector ===
While all 60 seats in the Agriculture and Fisheries subsector were taken by pro-Beijing candidates uncontestedly, the pro-democrats won all of the seats in the 60-member Social Welfare subsector despite the infighting among different pro-democrat tickets. Pro-democracy filmmaker Derek Yee emerged as the only candidate from his eight-member list to secure a seat in the 15-seat Performing Arts sub-subsector, which had always been monopolised by conservative pro-Beijing forces. The remaining 14 seats in the sub-subsector were taken by the Hong Kong Motion Picture Industry Association led by Beijing-friendly Crucindo Hung Cho-sing, whose ticket included actors and filmmakers Raymond Wong Pak-ming and Eric Tsang. The 15 members of the pro-democracy group ARTicipants led by songwriter Adrian Chow Pok-yin were all defeated in the Culture sub-subsector against the pro-Beijing 15-member list which included veteran actress Liza Wang.

=== Fourth sector ===
The 51-member Chinese People's Political Consultative Conference subsector was returned uncontestedly, while the Heung Yee Kuk subsector was seen in a rare contest. The pro-democrats contested in the Hong Kong and Kowloon District Councils subsector with a nine-member ticket but all of them were defeated by the pro-Beijing District Councillors.

== See also ==
- 2017 Hong Kong Chief Executive election
- Politics of Hong Kong
