= 2014 NPCSC Decision on Hong Kong =

People's Republic of China decision about Hong Kong elections

The Decision of the Standing Committee of the National People's Congress on Issues Relating to the Selection of the Chief Executive of the Hong Kong Special Administrative Region by Universal Suffrage and on the Method for Forming the Legislative Council of the Hong Kong Special Administrative Region in the Year 2016 (Chinese: 全國人民代表大會常務委員會關於香港特別行政區行政長官普選問題和2016年立法會產生辦法的決定), commonly known as the 31 August Decision (Chinese: 八三一決定; lit. '8 31 decision'), is a decision made by the Standing Committee of the National People's Congress (NPCSC), the national legislative body of the People's Republic of China (PRC) on 31 August 2014 which set limits for the 2017 Chief Executive election and 2016 Legislative Council election in the Hong Kong Special Administrative Region (HKSAR).

The decision states that a Hong Kong Chief Executive candidate has to "love the country [China] and love Hong Kong". For the 2017 Chief Executive election, a nominating committee, similar to the present Election Committee system, would be formed to nominate two to three candidates, each of whom must receive the support of more than half of the members of the nominating committee. After popular election of one of the nominated candidates, the new Chief Executive "will have to be appointed by the Central People's Government".

The process of forming the 2016 Legislative Council would be unchanged, but following the new process for the election of the Chief Executive, a new system to elect the Legislative Council via universal suffrage would be developed with the approval of Beijing. The decision was deemed by the pro-democracy activists as a violation of the principle of free and fair election and led to the large-scale occupation protests which was internationally known as "Umbrella Revolution".

== Background ==
In December 2013, the Hong Kong government launched a public consultative over the electoral method of the 2017 Chief Executive election and 2016 Legislative Council election. According to the Decision of the Standing Committee of the National People's Congress (NPCSC) in 2007, the 2017 Chief Executive election "may be implemented by the method of universal suffrage". After a period of consultation ran from December 2013 to May 2014, which the issues centred on whether the Chief Executive has to "love the Country and love Hong Kong" and the role of a nominating committee as stated in Hong Kong Basic Law Article 45 "the selection of the Chief Executive by universal suffrage upon nomination by a broadly representative nominating committee in accordance with democratic procedures."

As early in March 2013, Qiao Xiaoyang, chairman of the Law Committee under the NPCSC, stated that Chief Executive candidates must be persons who love the country and love Hong Kong, who do not insist on confronting the central government. Observers stated that Qiao comment was to screen out candidates from the opposition pro-democracy camp. Qiao also mentioned that "the nominating committee is in fact an organisation. The nomination of Chief Executive candidates by the nominating committee is a form of organisational nomination."

On 22 November 2013, Li Fei, Qiao's successor as NPCSC Law Committee chairman, stated that "the Chief Executive is accountable to the central government as well as Hong Kong. This means that the post must be taken up by a person who loves the country as well as Hong Kong – anyone opposed to the central government cannot [take it]."

After the first consultation period ended in May, the Consultation Report was published in July 2014. Following that Chief Executive Leung Chun-ying submitted the Report by the Chief Executive of the Hong Kong Special Administrative Region to the Standing Committee of the National People's Congress. The public generally speculated that the NPCSC would set the framework of the electoral reform in the meeting in coming August.

== Provisions ==
On 31 August 2014, the Tenth Session of the Standing Committee of the Twelfth National People's Congress adopted the Decision on selecting method of the 2017 Chief Executive and 2016 Legislative Council elections:

The Decision states that "the principle that the Chief Executive has to be a person who loves the country and loves Hong Kong must be upheld." The selecting method of the Chief Executive has to be framed institutionally to maintain long-term prosperity and stability of Hong Kong and uphold the sovereignty, security and development interests of the country.

It also states that a broadly representative nominating committee shall be formed, in which the number of members, composition and formation method of the nominating committee shall be made in accordance to the existing Election Committee formed in 2012. The nominating committee shall nominate two to three candidates, in which each candidate must have the endorsement of more than half of all the members of the nominating committee before all eligible voters can vote in the election.

The Chief Executive-elect, after being selected through universal suffrage, will have to be appointed by the Central People's Government.

The formation method and procedures for voting on bills and motions of the 5th Legislative Council will continue to apply to the 6th Legislative Council in 2016. After the election of the Chief Executive by universal suffrage, the election of all the members of the Legislative Council may be implemented by the method of universal suffrage.

== Reactions ==
The Hong Kong government welcomed the NPCSC decision. Chief Executive Leung Chun-ying said that "the majority of Hong Kong citizens, namely, the 5 million qualified voters of the selection of Chief Executive in 2017, will be able to cast their votes to select the chief executive." He also said "this is the first opportunity – a very good opportunity – for Hong Kong to have one man, one vote – universal suffrage. This is something we should all feel proud of."

The Occupy Central with Love and Peace movement who had vowed to launch a massive civil obedience occupation at the city centre of Central, Hong Kong if the constitutional reform proposals did not reach the international standard of free and fair election slammed Beijing's decision as a move that stifles democracy and blocks people with different political views from running for office. "Genuine universal suffrage includes both the rights to elect and to be elected," its statement said. "The decision of the NPC Standing Committee has deprived people with different political views of the right to run for election and be elected by imposing unreasonable restrictions, thereby perpetuating 'handpicked politics'." It said it would go on with their Occupy Central plan in the rally where several thousand people turned out opposing Beijing's plan on 31 August night. Occupy Central co-founder Benny Tai told the crowd, "our hope is that people gathered here will be dauntless civil resisters. What is our hope? Our hope is that today Hong Kong has entered a new era, an era of civil disobedience, an era of resistance."

The pan-democracy camp saw it as the method to screen out the opposition candidates as the pan-democrat candidates would not get a majority support from the nominating committee if its composition mirrors the existing Election Committee which dominated by pro-Beijing interests. The pan-democrat candidates were able to enter the Chief Executive elections by getting just one-eighth of the nomination threshold from the Election Committee. There were also some interpretations that an organisational nomination would be a breach of the Basic Law. The Democratic Party vowed to "veto this revolting proposal".

The largest student organisation Hong Kong Federation of Students (HKFS) and student activist group Scholarism urged university and secondary school students to boycott classes opposing the NPCSC decision and also organised public events, including street assemblies. The student movement evolved into the 79-day large-scale occupy movement internationally known as "Umbrella Revolution". The retraction of the NPCSC decision became one of the main goals of the protesters. On 28 October, the HKFS issued an open letter to the Chief Secretary Carrie Lam asking for a second round of talks. HKFS set out a prerequisite for the negotiation, that the government's report to the Chinese government must include a call for the retraction of the NPCSC's decision. The government refused the demand, stating that the political reform has to be bounded by the NPCSC decision.

In an opinion poll carried out by Chinese University of Hong Kong, only 36.1% of 802 people surveyed between 8–15 October accept NPCSC's decision but 55.6% are willing to accept if the HKSAR Government would democratise the nominating committee during the second phase of public consultation period.

== Aftermath ==
On 7 January 2015, the Hong Kong government launched a two-month public consultation after the delay due to the protests. The pan-democracy camp boycotted the consultation in protest against the NPCSC decision.

On 31 May 2015, three top Beijing officials, Hong Kong Basic Law Committee chairman Li Fei, Hong Kong and Macau Affairs Office director Wang Guangya and Liaison Office of the Central People's Government in Hong Kong director Zhang Xiaoming met with members of the Legislative Council in Shenzhen including pan-democracy legislators. The Beijing officials dashed any hope of last-minute concessions from Beijing with tough stances during the four-hour talk and the post-meeting press conference. Li also stressed that the framework set down on 31 August would govern the election of Hong Kong's leader by universal suffrage in 2017 and onwards. The pan-democrats said they would definitely veto the political reform package as the meeting with mainland officials left them with no choice.

On 18 June 2015, the Legislative Council rejected the unmodified electoral reform proposal with 8 votes in favour, 28 against, and 33 not voting.

The pan-democrats have been calling for the NPCSC decision to be shelved, but pro-Beijing politicians had said the decision would be still relevant after 2017. It also became one of the key issues in the 2017 Chief Executive election, in which the pro-democrats pressured the candidates to relaunch the constitutional reform without the 831 basis.

== See also ==
- Democratic development in Hong Kong
- Guardian Council

== Related documents ==
- Decision of the Standing Committee of the National People's Congress on Issues Relating to the Selection of the Chief Executive of the Hong Kong Special Administrative Region by Universal Suffrage and on the Method for Forming the Legislative Council of the Hong Kong Special Administrative Region in the Year 2016
- Explanations on the Draft Decision of the Standing Committee of the National People's Congress on Issues Relating to the Selection of the Chief Executive of the Hong Kong Special Administrative Region by Universal Suffrage and on the Method for Forming the Legislative Council of the Hong Kong Special Administrative Region in the Year 2016 Report on the Recent Community and Political Situation in Hong Kong
