= Office of the Chief Executive (building) =

行政長官辦公室 Office of the Chief Executive
- Office of the Chief Executive (in English) 行政長官辦公室 (in Chinese)
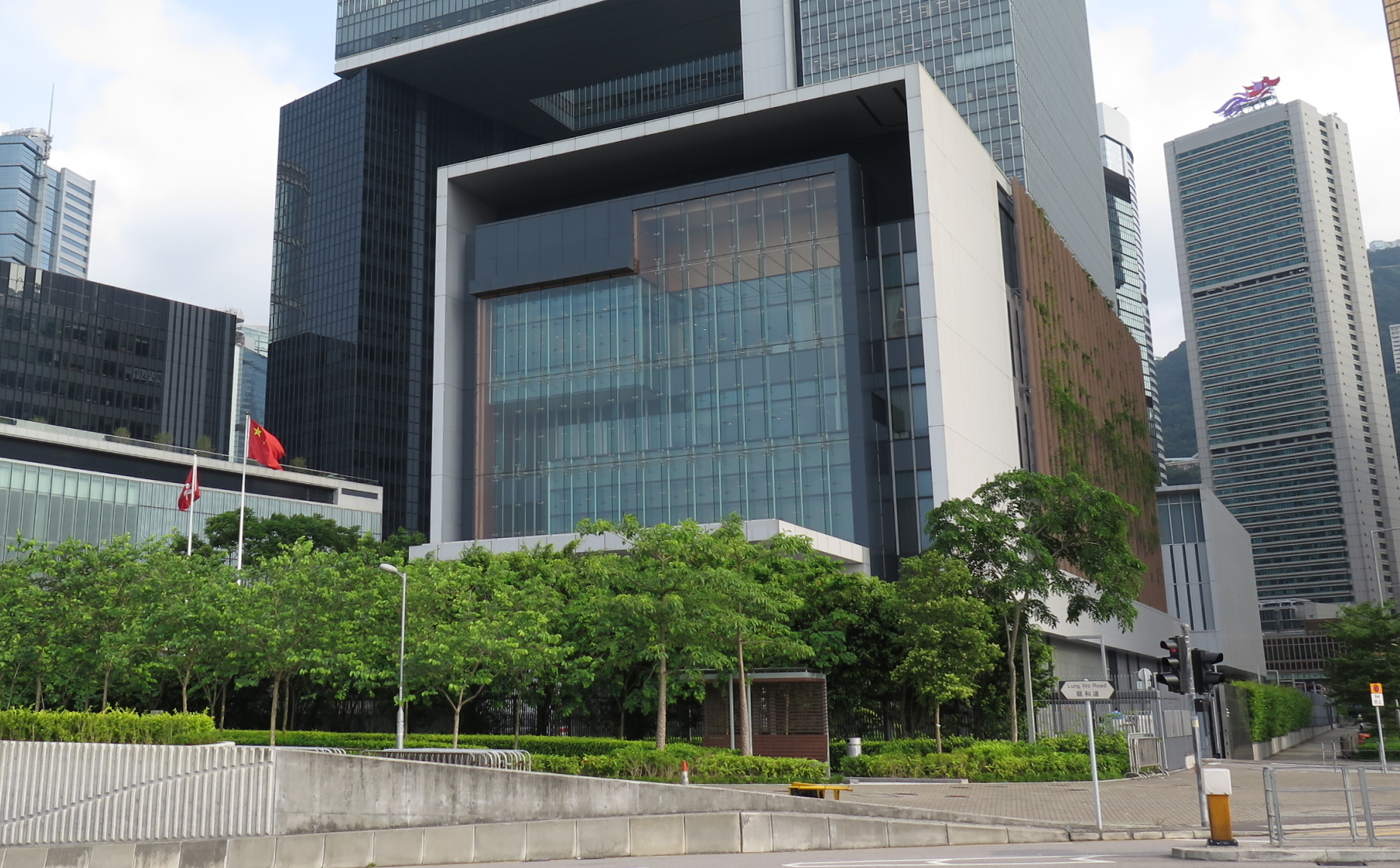
- View of Office of the Chief Executive from Tim Wa Avenue

- Location within Hong Kong
- Alternative names: Chief Executive's Office Building, Central Government Headquarters Lower Block

General information
- Type: Government use building
- Classification: Government use building
- Location: 1 Tim Wa Avenue, Tamar, Admiralty, Hong Kong Island, Hong Kong SAR
- Coordinates: 22.2815°N 114.1651°E
- Construction started: February 2008; 18 years ago
- Completed: September 2011; 14 years ago
- Opened: 8 August 2011; 14 years ago
- Owner: Hong Kong Special Administrative Region
- Management: Office of the Chief Executive

Technical details
- Structural system: Ferroconcrete

Design and construction
- Main contractor: Gammon—Hip Hing

Website
- ceo.gov.hk

Office of the Chief Executive
- Traditional Chinese: 行政長官辦公室
Transcriptions
Yue: Cantonese
- Yale Romanization: Hàhng jing jéung gūn baahn gūng sāt
- Jyutping: Hang4 zing3 zoeng2 gun1 baan6 gung1 sat1

Office of the Chief Executive is an office building that contains the offices of the Chief Executive of Hong Kong. It is located at 1 Tim Wa Avenue in Admiralty on the northern shore of Hong Kong Island. It is one of three buildings in the Tamar Development Project; the Legislative Council Complex is to its east, while the Central Government Complex is to its south. The open space between these three buildings is preserved as Tamar Park.

The building started operating on 8 August 2011. Before that, the Chief Executive's office operated from Government House in Central.

== Nearby ==
- Central Government Complex
- Legislative Council Complex
- Tamar Park

== See also ==
- Office of the Chief Executive
- Government House, Hong Kong
