= Beating of Ken Tsang =

Hong Kong police brutality case

- TVB footage of Ken Tsang being assaulted by police
- Location: 22.28285°N 114.16471°E; Corner near electrical substation in Tamar Park, Lung Wo Road, Central, Hong Kong
- Date: 15 October 2014; Around 03:00
- Attack type: Police brutality, beating
- Victim: Ken Tsang
- Perpetrators: Wong Cho-shing (黃祖成); Lau Cheuk-ngai (劉卓毅); Pak Wing-bun (白榮斌); Chan Siu-tan (陳少丹); Kwan Ka-ho (關嘉豪)
- Accused: Lau Hing-pui (劉興沛); Wong Wai-ho (黃偉豪)
- Charges: All officers: Causing grievous bodily harm with intent Chan: Common assault Tsang: Assault of a police officer in the due execution of his duty, resisting a police officer in the due execution of his duty
- Verdict: Officers' first trial: All guilty of the lesser offense of assault occasioning actual bodily harm, Chan guilty of common assault On appeal: Lau Hing-pui, Wong Wai-ho: Not guilty; Remaining officers: Convictions upheld; Tsang: Guilty
- Convictions: Wong Cho-shing, Lau Cheuk-ngai, Pak, Chan, Kwan: Assault occasioning actual bodily harm Chan: Common assault Tsang: Assault of a police officer, resisting arrest
- Sentence: Officers: First trial: 2 years in prison On appeal: Lau Hing-pui, Wong Wai-ho: Sentences overturned; Remaining officers: Reduced to 1 1/4 to 1 1/2 years in prison; Tsang: 5 weeks in jail

On 15 October 2014, pro-democracy activist Ken Tsang was beaten by Hong Kong Police officers in Tamar Park, Admiralty, after being arrested in a police clearance operation during the 2014 Hong Kong protests. Though not the only reported instance of police brutality during the protests, the assault gained notoriety as it was filmed from a distance by a Television Broadcasts Limited (TVB) news crew and broadcast to Hong Kong audiences.

In February 2017, seven police officers were convicted of the assault and were sentenced to two years in prison. On appeal, two of the officers had their convictions overturned and the remaining five had their sentences reduced to a bit over one year in prison.

== Background ==
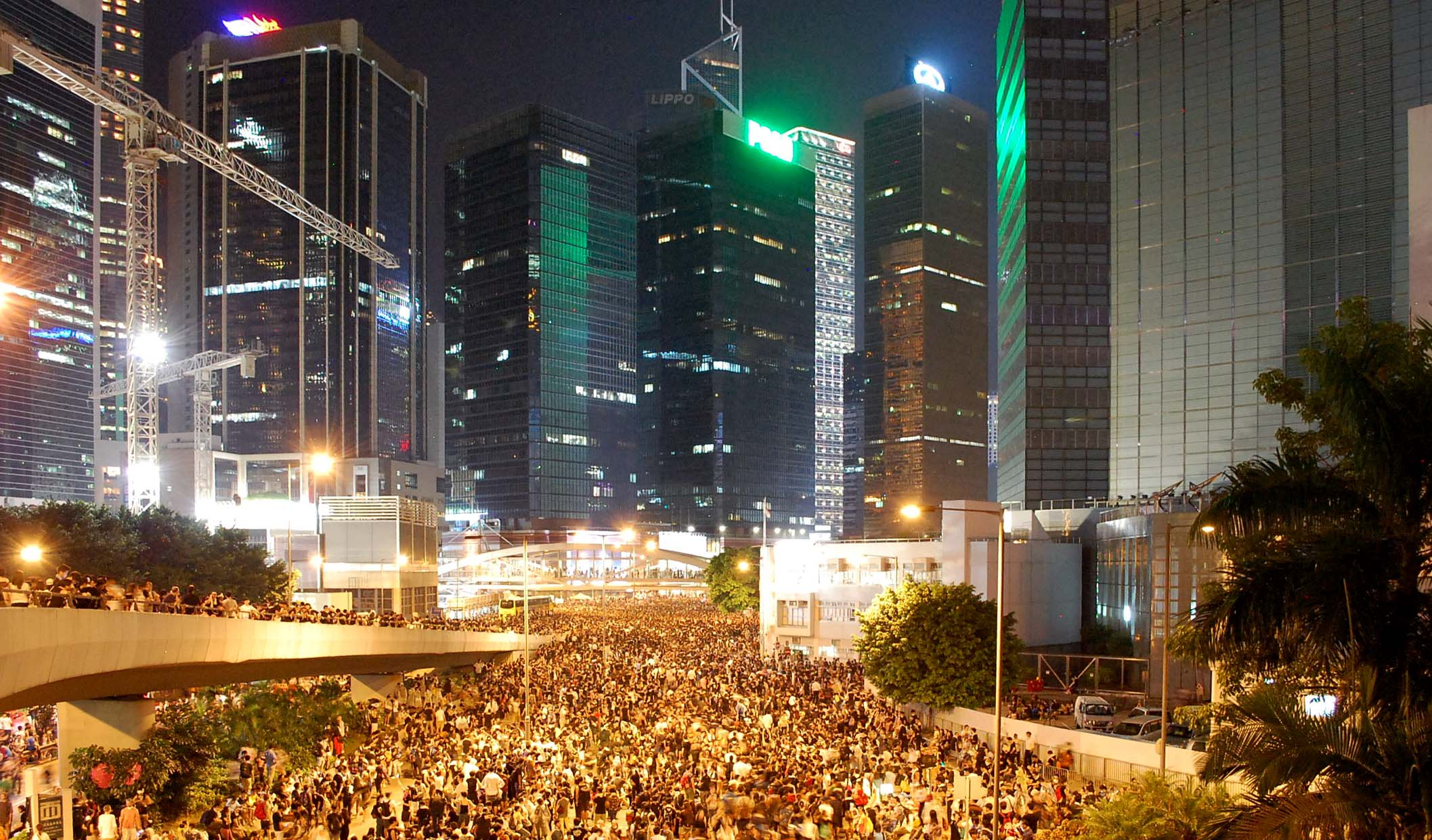
The Admiralty protest site in late 2014

Ken Tsang Kin-chiu (Chinese: 曾健超; Jyutping: zang1 gin6 ciu1, born 12 July 1975) is a registered social worker who studied journalism at Shue Yan College in the 1990s, and was a member of the Civic Party at the time of the assault. He was travelling in South America when the Umbrella Movement began in late September 2014, and flew back to Hong Kong to join the protests.

The 2014 protests occurred after the Standing Committee of the National People's Congress (NPCSC) issued a decision regarding proposed reforms to the Hong Kong electoral system. The decision was widely seen to be tantamount to the Chinese Communist Party pre-screening the candidates for the leader of Hong Kong. The protests took the form of occupation of major roads in Admiralty, Wan Chai, Causeway Bay, Tsim Sha Tsui, and Mong Kok.

The beating of Ken Tsang took place at Admiralty, site of the largest protests.

== Incident ==
The incident occurred near the Central Government Complex in the early morning of 15 October 2014 as the police carried out "Operation Solarpeak" in an attempt to clear the area of protesters. At about 02:45 Hong Kong Time, the police reached the underpass where Lung Wo Road passes below Tamar Park. Tsang was spotted in a planter above the underpass pouring liquid onto the police below. Various police officers descended on him. Tsang struggled during the arrest and was pepper sprayed in the face before being handcuffed with a zip tie at his back.

Tsang was then handed over to six police officers (Wong Cho-shing, Lau Cheuk-ngai, Pak Wing-bun, Lau Hing-pui, Chan Siu-tan, and Kwan Ka-ho; see "trial" below for Chinese names and ranks), who were meant to carry arrested protesters to vehicles parked on Lung Wo Road for transport to the Central Police Station. Instead they carried him to the north side of a utility building, the Lung Wui Road Government Building Pump Station East Substation, with the help of a seventh officer, Wong Wai-ho. Tsang was dumped on the ground in an area later described as the "dark corner" (暗角) and then punched, kicked and stamped on by the police officers for around four minutes.

The police officers then transported Tsang to the Central Police Station, where Chan, in the presence of Kwan, slapped Tsang on the face twice. Tsang was then brought to the police college in Wong Chuk Hang and later to the Ruttonjee Hospital for medical treatment. Afterward he was taken to the North Point Police Station.

The doctor who treated Tsang at the Accident and Emergency Department of Ruttonjee Hospital noted extensive injuries including swelling and bruising of the forehead, upper face, and chin; bruising of the neck; bruising of the clavicle; circular reddish bruises all over the chest; bruising of both sides of the abdomen; bruising of the back; bruising of the left wrist; abrasions and bruising of the left arm and hand; and abrasion of the left knee. Doctors testified that the distinctive circular bruises were likely caused by forceful jabbing of retracted police batons.

== TVB self-censorship controversy ==
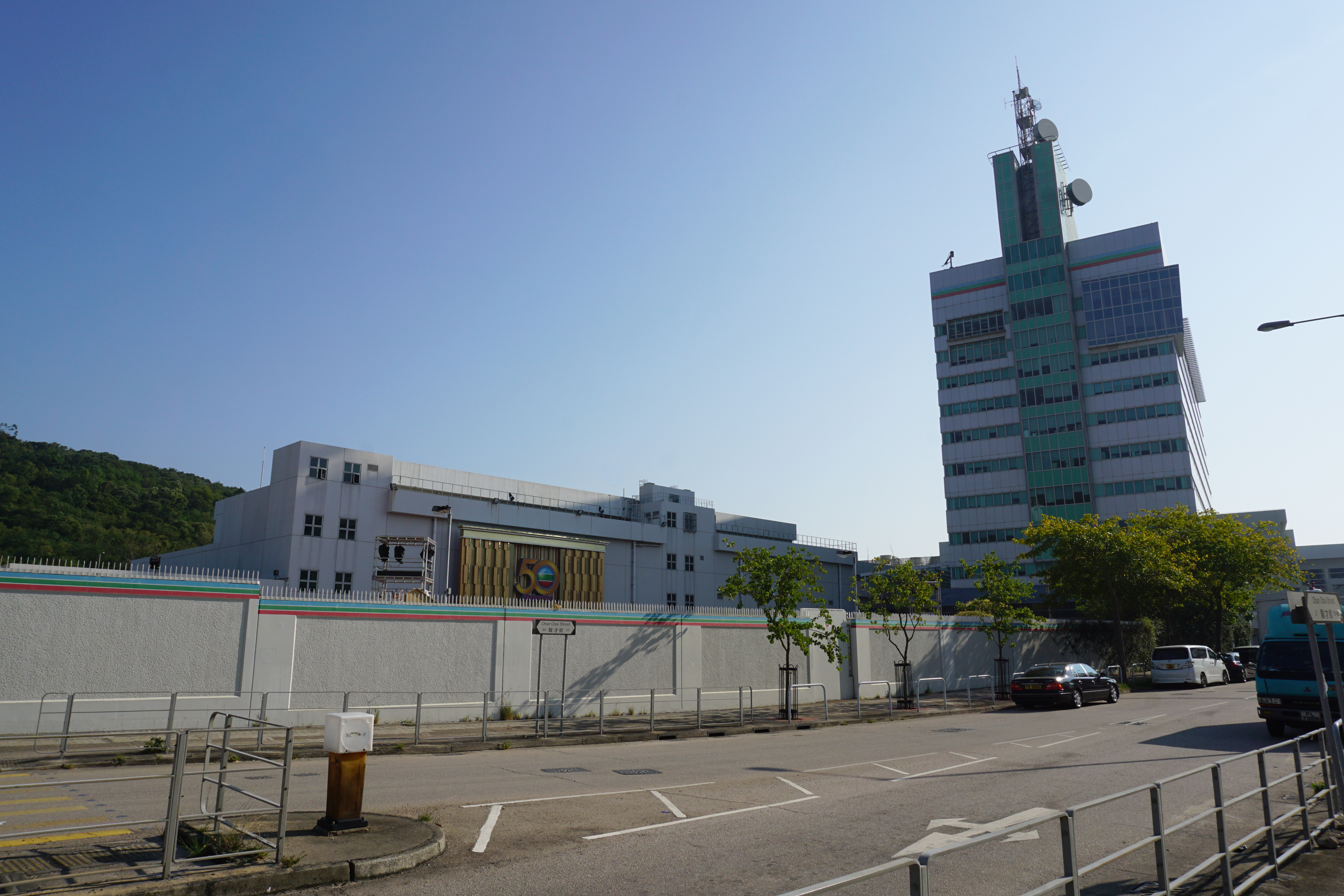
TVB City, headquarters of TVB News

The video recorded by a Television Broadcasts (TVB) news crew was important to the subsequent conviction of the involved police officers. When first aired in the early morning, the clip included the original voiceover by the journalist on the scene, who stated Tsang was "kicked and hit by the police". However, this audio (and subtitle) was removed in subsequent broadcasts, reportedly at the behest of news controller Keith Yuen Chi-wai.

The broadcaster was criticised for self-censorship and "pandering to the police". The redaction worsened concerns of diminishing press freedom in Hong Kong as more media outlets practice self-censorship to avoid running foul of the establishment. About 80 TVB journalists and news anchors submitted a petition to management in protest of Yuen's actions. The petition stated: "The neutrality of the commentary was not in question, as it simply described what was taking place."

It was subsequently reported that TVB management had punished staff who had signed the petition. News editor Chris Wong, the most senior employee who had signed the petition, was relieved of his duties. Many journalists were barred from working on local news stories, while others had their bonuses docked. Ho Wing-hong, the news editor responsible for broadcasting the video, was demoted.

Following the censorship incident TVB saw an exodus of journalists and other news staff.

== Post-assault ==
The length of time it took to charge anyone for the beating was criticised. One year after, about 100 people demonstrated at the "dark corner" where Tsang was beaten.

The morning after on 15 October 2015, Ken Tsang announced on Commercial Radio that the police had phoned him and told him that he would be arrested by appointment and charged with one count of assaulting police and four counts of obstructing public officers.

On the same day, seven officers were charged with the assault on him.

In May 2016 Tsang was found guilty of three counts of assaulting police and resisting arrest, and was sentenced to five weeks in jail. Principal Magistrate Peter Law noted that Tsang did not intend to hurt the police, but stated that it was a serious crime and Tsang showed no remorse.

== Trial ==
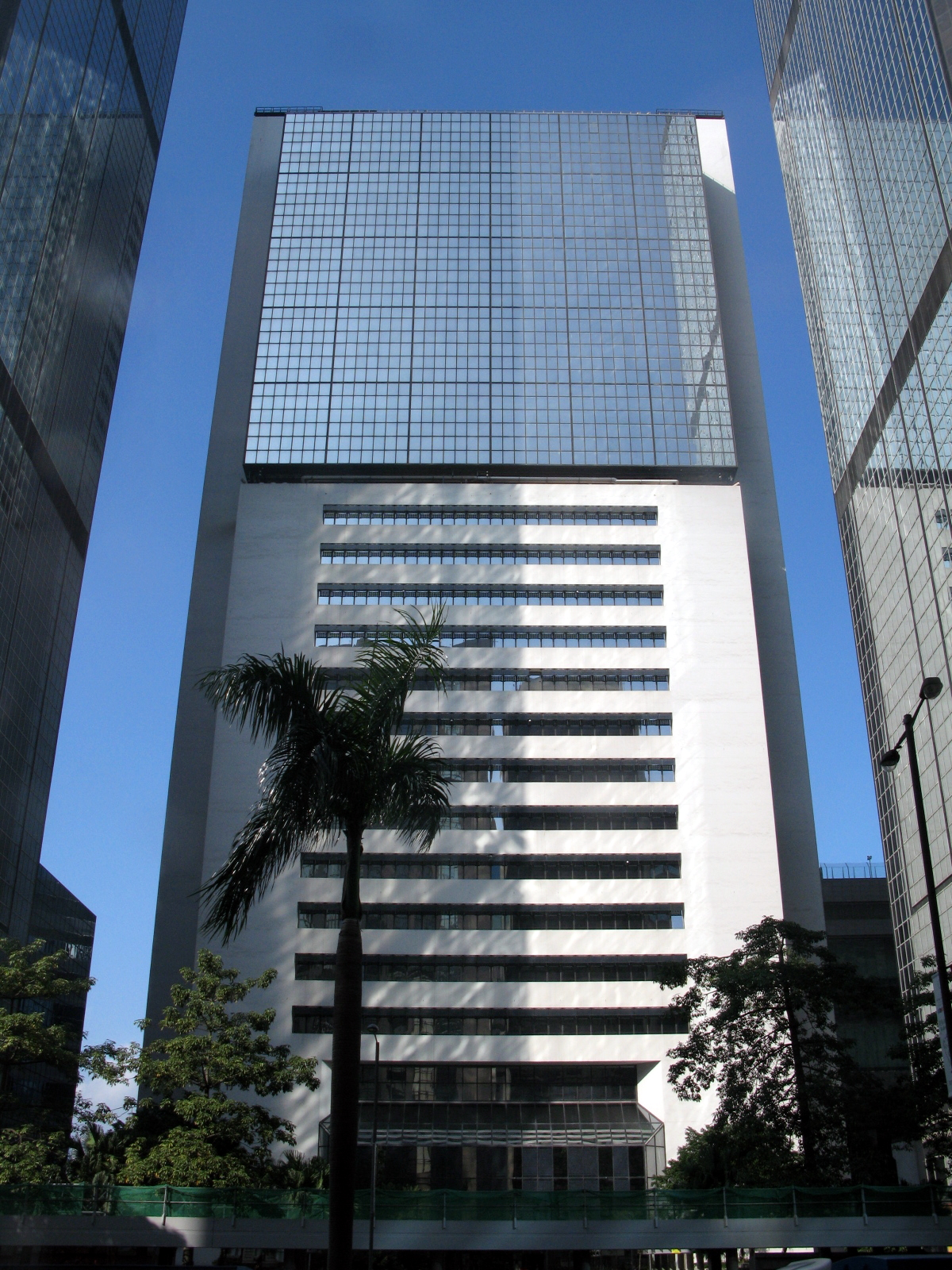
Wanchai Tower, home to the District Court

The following seven defendants were charged with causing grievous bodily harm with intent. Chan was also charged with common assault for slapping Tsang in the police station.

- Wong Cho-shing (黃祖成), chief inspector, Organised Crime and Triad Bureau
- Lau Cheuk-ngai (劉卓毅), senior inspector, Kwun Tong district
- Pak Wing-bun (白榮斌), detective sergeant, Kwun Tong district
- Lau Hing-pui (劉興沛), constable, Kwun Tong district
- Chan Siu-tan (陳少丹), constable, Kowloon East district crime unit
- Kwan Ka-ho (關嘉豪), constable, Kowloon City district
- Wong Wai-ho (黃偉豪), constable, Kwun Tong district

The case was seen in the District Court before judge David John Dufton. The court saw a variety of evidence, including video footage and photography of the events before and after the beating from Apple Daily, Asia Television, Now TV, Oriental Daily News, police video teams, as well as CCTV from the Central Police Station. The critical TVB footage was also scrutinised, and the prosecutors had to call on various technical staff from TVB to help verify the authenticity of the video footage in light of challenges from the defence.

The defence counsel put forward a variety of arguments on behalf of their clients, including that the officers might have beaten another protester and not Tsang.

== Conviction and sentencing ==
On 14 February 2017 the seven defendants were found guilty of assault occasioning actual bodily harm. Chan was also convicted of common assault for slapping Tsang at the police station. The officers evaded the more serious original charge because the court decided that Tsang's injuries amounted to actual bodily harm, but not "grievous bodily harm".

In delivering the ruling, the judge stated that "the defendants have not only brought dishonour to the Hong Kong Police Force, they have also damaged Hong Kong's reputation in the international community," and stated that "every police officer has a duty to prevent the commission of a crime, even by fellow police officers".

On 17 February 2017 the court sentenced the seven convicted officers to two years' imprisonment. Judge Dufton cited the seriousness of the crimes in rejecting the officers' plea for suspended sentences. Dufton originally stipulated a jail term of two years and six months for each officer resulting from their joint conviction for assault occasioning actual bodily harm. However, he reduced the sentence by six months after taking into account the circumstances at the time and the high stress environment that police were in handling the protests. He also considered the officers’ previously clear records and other service to the community. Additionally, Dufton considered their dismissal from the police force and the likelihood that the officers would lose their pensions. He explained the decision to imprison the officers, stating: "I am satisfied a term of imprisonment is appropriate. Tsang was defenceless, his hands handcuffed behind his back with plastic ties. The assault was a vicious assault, in particular the first thirty seconds when Tsang was dumped on the ground, stabbed, stamped on and repeatedly kicked. Most fortunately Tsang did not suffer more serious injuries."

== Reactions to verdict ==
=== Police response ===
Police commissioner Stephen Lo Wai-chung expressed sadness over the sentencing and offered assistance to the seven officers.

Joe Chan, chairman of the Junior Police Officers’ Association, stated that he was "shocked" by the jail term and vowed that his union, representing more than 20,000 officers, would help the convicted officers appeal the verdict. He added that many officers considered the judgment and sentence "unacceptable". They appealed for donations from the public.

The police union held a rally in support of the officers – now convicted criminals – on 22 February 2017 at the Police Sports and Recreation Club in Prince Edward, the turnout, according to the organizers between 30,000–38,000. Tim Hamlett, writing for the Hong Kong Free Press, estimated the turnout might have been around 10,000. Various pro-Beijing politicians attended including Priscilla Leung, Regina Ip, Maria Tam, Junius Ho, and Elizabeth Quat. Reporters were barred from the event, and a Hong Kong Free Press journalist was forced from the venue to jeering.

=== Lawmakers ===
Several pro-Beijing lawmakers, including Priscilla Leung and Ann Chiang, defended the officers, stating that their actions were the result of being provoked by Tsang.

Pro-Beijing legislator Junius Ho also tried to justify the crime against Tsang and stated that the police officers should be given community service orders rather than jail time. He referred to Ken Tsang as a "rubbish social worker" and "some jerk".

James To of the Democratic Party stated that the officers should face the consequences of their actions.

=== Attacks on the judiciary and racism toward judge ===
Following the conviction and sentencing, some pro-Beijing and pro-police groups attacked the judicial system as well as David Dufton, the judge who presided over the case. They called the ruling "political prosecution" and posted a photo of non-Chinese judges on social media, calling them "foreigners who mess up Hong Kong". They also attempted to organise a rally on social media against the judge, whom they called a "dog", but the post was later removed. One activist smashed a picture of the judge outside the courthouse after the sentence was delivered. Others held placards calling the judge a western dog.

The pro-Beijing legislator Wong Kwok-kin also complained of the prison sentencing, and criticised the "yellow heart" of the "white skin" judge, referring respectively to the colour associated with the Umbrella Movement and Dufton's ethnicity.

Cai Xiaoxin, son of the late Chinese People's Liberation Army commander Cai Changyuan, made a public offer of 10,000 yuan to anyone who beat up David Dufton, whom he called a "British bastard". In a separate post, he stated that China would dismantle Hong Kong's independent judiciary earlier than 2047. Hong Kong barrister Albert Luk Wai-hung warned that Cai, who lives in Beijing, could be charged with various offences if he set foot in Hong Kong, including contempt of court and accessing a computer with criminal or dishonest intent.

In response to the abuse toward the judge, the Judiciary expressed concern and stated that comments had been referred to the Department of Justice. Secretary for Justice Rimsky Yuen appealed to the public to respect the rule of law. Barrister Chris Ng warned that the pro-police groups could be convicted of contempt of court. The Hong Kong Bar Association agreed that the personal attacks on the judge amount to contempt of court, and stated that insulting and threatening words would preclude rational discussion about the case.

Despite the warnings, protesters attending an 18 February 2017 rally organised by the pro-government group Politihk Social Strategic continued to attack the judge, calling him a dog, pretending to beat up a protester dressed as a judge, and shouting "fucking David".

==== Subsequent commentary ====
Since the sentencing, there have been calls from some mainland Chinese professors and NPC delegates to limit or replace non-ethnic-Chinese judges in Hong Kong in favour of ethnic Chinese judges due to the former's "lack of understanding". Some have even suggested amending the Basic Law of Hong Kong. However critics from fellow NPC delegates, politicians from the pro-democracy camp, senior Hong Kong government officials and Hong Kong-based commentators have slammed the proposals as racist or unnecessary, saying that judges in Hong Kong are hired based on merit regardless of ethnicity, and help to maintain Hong Kong's role of super-connector between China and the international community.

=== Chinese state media ===
The People’s Daily described the sentencing as an "assault on rule of law in Hong Kong". The newspaper also stated, "The judge responsible for this case David Dufton is a British person, and Hong Kong's judicial system not only has many judges of foreign nationalities, but many were cultivated by the British Hong Kong government...but this kind of system clearly has room for discussion, which is that the issue of their standpoint may influence their judgements in cases."

=== Other ===
Ken Tsang, the beaten activist, stated the sentencing was "a minor victory for civil society against police violence".

=== Comparison to the Holocaust ===
During the police rally on 22 February 2017, police speakers compared the treatment of police officers with the persecution of Jewish people during The Holocaust of World War II. This prompted a response from two consulates in Hong Kong.

The Israeli consulate in Hong Kong stated: "Without relating to the trial of the seven police officers, the alleged statement at the rally that made a reference to the persecution of Jews in Nazi Germany is inappropriate and regretful. We wish no further comparison will be made to the Jewish Holocaust."

Similarly, the German consulate in Hong Kong stated: "The reported reference to the Holocaust shows a regrettably insufficient knowledge of historical facts. The Jewish population in Germany was persecuted by the State and all its organs during the Nazi dictatorship and millions lost their lives. Therefore the comparison between the Jewish victims of the Holocaust and police officers convicted for an abuse of power is utterly inappropriate".

The Hong Kong Holocaust and Tolerance Centre also weighed in, saying the comments "trivialised" the Holocaust.

== Appeal and bail ==
The convicted officers appealed the sentence. In June 2017, following a few months in jail, three of the convicted were granted bail by the Court of Appeal, namely: Lau Cheuk-ngai, Lau Hing-pui, and Wong Wai-ho. Wong Cho-shing, Pak Wing-bun, and Chan Siu-tan were all granted bail in July 2017. The last of the seven convicted, Kwan Ka-ho, was released on bail on 9 August 2017.

On July 26 2019, the Court of Appeal found two of the seven police officers not guilty and they were allowed to walk free, while the other five had their sentences further reduced by 6-9 months. Despite this around 30 police supporters outside the courtroom complained that the rule of law is dead and "rioters" were not being jailed.

The five officers tried to appeal at the Court of Final Appeal. Their request was turned down by the court on 7 April 2020.
