= Ken Tsang =

Hong Kong social worker and activist

Ken Tsang Kin-chiu
- 曾健超
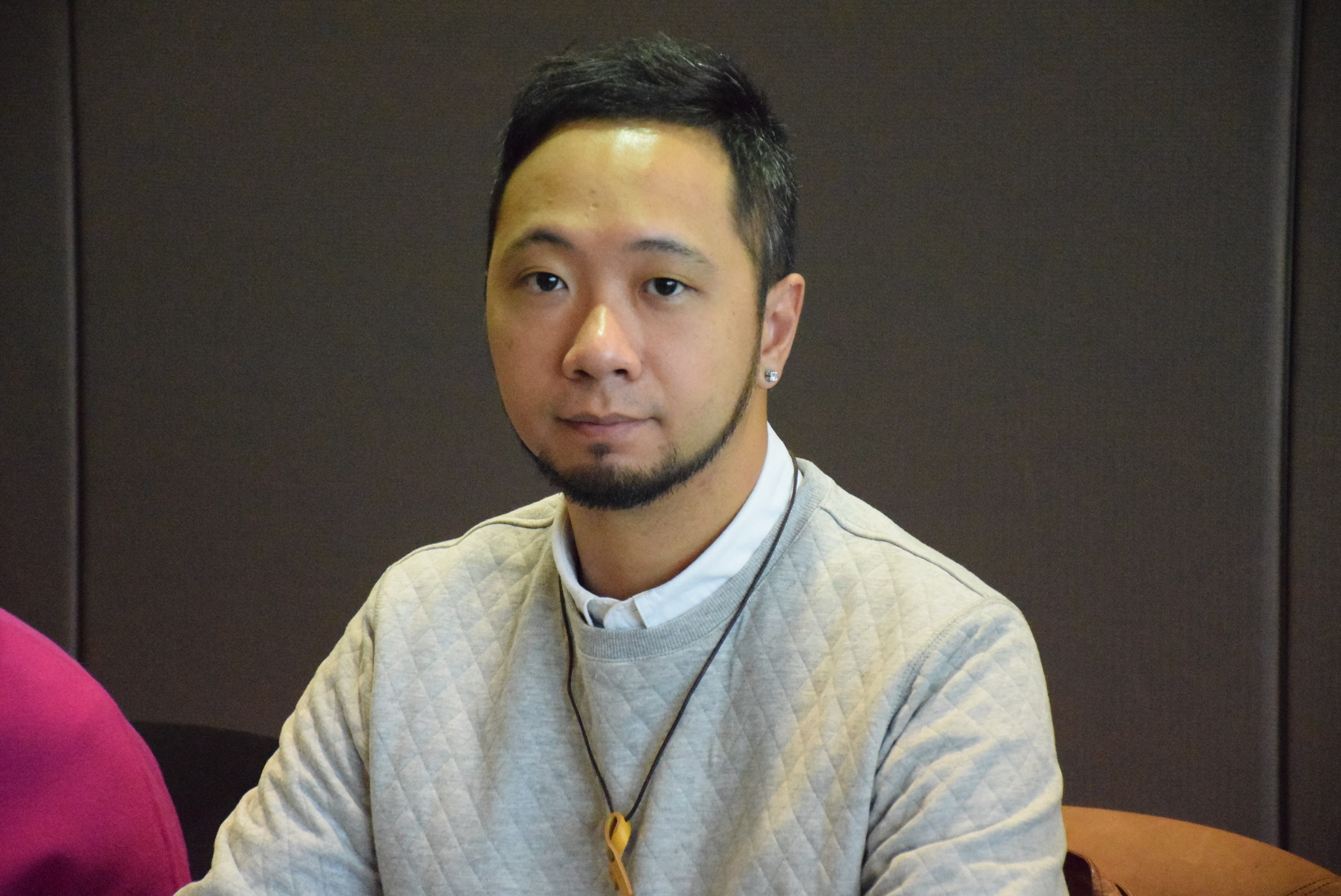
- Ken Tsang in 2015.

Member of the Kowloon City District Council
- In office 1 January 2020 – 28 September 2021
- Preceded by: Terrence Siu Tin-hung
- Constituency: Ma Tau Wai

Personal details
- Born: 23 July 1975 (age 51) British Hong Kong
- Party: Civic Party (until 2016)
- Education: Carmel Tang Binnan Memorial Secondary School; New Zealand International Pacific College; Hong Kong Polytechnic University; Hong Kong Shue Yan College
- Occupation: Registered social worker

Ken Tsang Kin-chiu (Chinese: 曾健超; born 12 July 1975) is a Hong Kong activist and social worker. He is most known for his beating incident during the 2014 Hong Kong protests.

== Background ==
Tsang studied Journalism at the Shue Yan College before he studied Social Work at the Hong Kong Polytechnic University. He was a member of the standing committee of the Hong Kong Federation of Students in 1997. He worked as a flight attendant and social work after graduation.

He represented the Civic Party to run in the 2007 and 2011 District Council elections but was both defeated. In the 2008 Legislative Council election, he ran as a third candidate on Civic Party's Ronny Tong ticket in New Territories East. Tong was re-elected with almost 40,000 votes. Ken Tsang contested 2019 District Council Election and was elected to represent Ma Tau Wai Constituency of Kowloon City District on 24 November 2019. He obtained 4,264 votes, 52% of total valid votes.

In the 2011 Election Committee subsector elections, he won a seat in the Social Welfare subsector of the Election Committee. During the speech of the General Secretary of the Chinese Communist Party Hu Jintao in the swearing-in ceremony of the elected Chief Executive Leung Chun-ying, Tsang protested by shouting slogan "rehabilitating June Fourth" and was taken out by security.

== Beating incident ==
He came to spotlight during the 2014 Hong Kong protests when he was beaten by seven Hong Kong Police officers in Tamar Park, Admiralty, after being arrested in a police clearance operation after he poured foul-smelling liquid over eleven officers on 15 October 2014. He was noted with extensive injuries including swelling and bruising of the forehead, upper face, and chin; bruising of the neck; bruising of the clavicle; circular reddish bruises all over the chest; bruising of both sides of the abdomen; bruising of the back; bruising of the left wrist; abrasions and bruising of the left arm and hand; and abrasion of the left knee. Doctors testified that the distinctive circular bruises were likely caused by forceful jabbing of retracted police batons.

In October 2015, Tsang was arrested for one count of assaulting police and four counts of obstructing public officers, along with the seven officers who were charged with the assault on him. In May 2016, Tsang was found guilty of three counts of assaulting police and resisting arrest, and was sentenced to five weeks in jail. Principal Magistrate Peter Law noted that Tsang did not intend to hurt the police, but stated that it was a serious crime and Tsang showed no remorse. The seven police officers were also found guilty of assault occasioning actual bodily harm on Tsang and were sentenced to two years' imprisonment.

== After beating incident ==
Tsang ran in the 2016 Legislative Council election as an independent in Social Welfare constituency after failing to gain the nomination from the Civic Party. He lost to another leading figure of the Occupy protests Shiu Ka-chun.

He was re-elected in the 2016 Election Committee subsector elections. As he was serving in prison during the 2017 Chief Executive election, he became the first individual who voted in the Chief Executive election in prison.

He expressed interest in running in the March 2018 Kowloon West by-election left vacant by pro-independence Youngspiration's Yau Wai-ching over the oath-taking controversy but announced his withdrawal at the press conference of the Power for Democracy's press conference on 5 December 2017 on the primary election between pro-democracy candidates and weighed supported behind another disqualified legislator Yiu Chung-yim.

Political offices
| Preceded by Terence Siu | Member of the Kowloon City District Council; Representative for Ma Tau Wai; 2020–2021 | Vacant |
