= Ma Tau Wai (constituency) =

Hong Kong constituency

- Elected constituency for the Kowloon City District Council
- Boundary of Ma Tau Wai in Kowloon City District
- District: Kowloon City
- Legislative Council constituency: Kowloon Central
- Population: 20,629 (2019)
- Electorate: 11,106 (2019)

Current constituency
- Created: 1991
- Number of members: One
- Member: Vacant
- Created from: Lung Shing

Ma Tau Wai (Chinese: 馬頭圍) is one of the 25 constituencies in the Kowloon City District of Hong Kong which was created in 1991.

The constituency loosely covers Ma Tau Wai with the estimated population of 20,629.

== Councillors represented ==
Election	Member	Party
1991	Luk Wai-kong	Nonpartisan
1999	Rosanda Mok Ka-han	ADPL
2015	Terrence Siu Tin-hung	DAB
2019	Ken Tsang Kin-chiu→Vacant (Note: Disqualified on 28 September 2021.)	Independent

== Election results ==
=== 2010s ===
Kowloon City District Council Election, 2019: Ma Tau Wai
Party	Candidate	Votes	%	±%
Independent	Ken Tsang Kin-chiu	4,264	52.84	
DAB	Terrence Siu Tin-hung	3,712	46.00	−4.40
Nonpartisan	Lam Tin-yan	93	1.15	
Majority		552	6.84	
Turnout		8,092	72.91	
Independent gain from DAB		Swing		

Kowloon City District Council Election, 2015: Ma Tau Wai
Party	Candidate	Votes	%	±%
DAB	Terrence Siu Tin-hung	2,670	50.4	+10.1
ADPL	Rosanda Mok Ka-han	2,625	49.6	–10.1
Majority		45	0.8	–18.6
Turnout		5,295	52.8	+6.8
DAB gain from ADPL		Swing	+10.1	

Kowloon City District Council Election, 2011: Ma Tau Wai
Party	Candidate	Votes	%	±%
ADPL	Rosanda Mok Ka-han	2,585	59.7	–18.5
DAB (FTU)	Sam Lam Sum-lim	1,773	40.3	+18.5
Majority		812	19.4	+13.4
Turnout		4,358	46.0	
ADPL hold		Swing	–18.5	

=== 2000s ===
Kowloon City District Council Election, 2007: Ma Tau Wai
Party	Candidate	Votes	%	±%
ADPL	Rosanda Mok Ka-han	1,943	53.0	+18.5
FTU (DAB)	Leung Ting-to	1,720	47.0	–18.5
Majority		223	6.0	–37.0
ADPL hold		Swing	+18.5	

Kowloon City District Council Election, 2003: Ma Tau Wai
Party	Candidate	Votes	%	±%
ADPL	Rosanda Mok Ka-han	2,573	71.5	+11.4
DAB	Leung Ting-to	1,027	28.5	–11.4
Majority		1,546	43.0	+22.8
ADPL hold		Swing	+11.4	

=== 1990s ===
Kowloon City District Council Election, 1999: Ma Tau Wai
Party	Candidate	Votes	%	±%
ADPL	Rosanda Mok Ka-han	1,687	60.1	
Nonpartisan	Luk Wai-kong	1,118	39.9	
Majority		569	20.2	
ADPL gain from Nonpartisan		Swing		

Kowloon City District Board Election, 1994: Ma Tau Wai
Party	Candidate	Votes	%	±%
Nonpartisan	Luk Wai-kong	uncontested		
Nonpartisan hold		Swing		

Kowloon City District Board Election, 1991: Ma Tau Wai
Party	Candidate	Votes	%	±%
Nonpartisan	Luk Wai-kong	uncontested		
Nonpartisan win (new seat)				
