= Office of the Chief Executive =

- 行政長官辦公室
- Emblem of the Hong Kong SAR

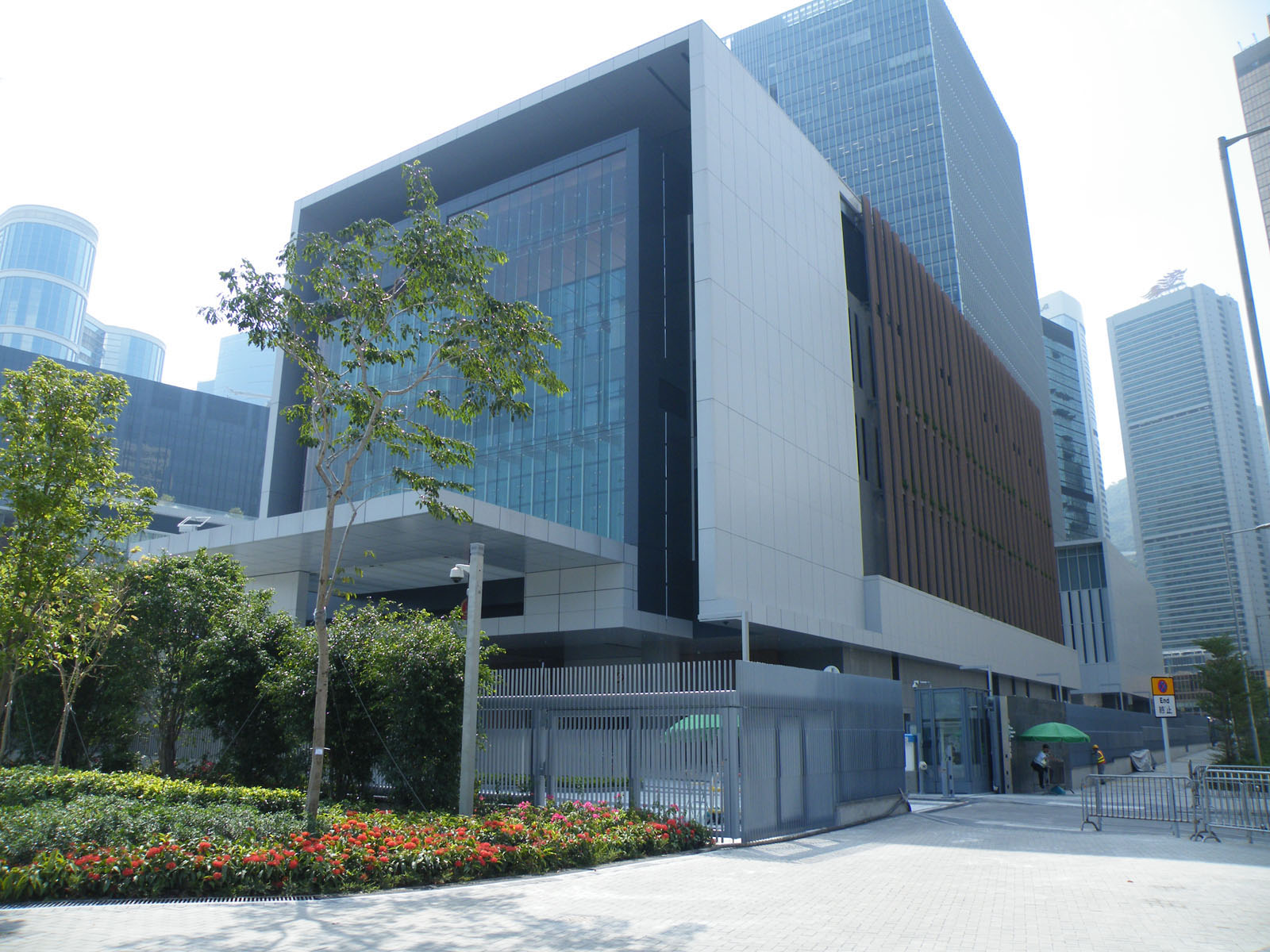

Agency overview
- Formed: 16 December 1996
- Jurisdiction: Government of Hong Kong
- Headquarters: Office of the Chief Executive, 1 Tim Wa Avenue, Tamar, Admiralty, Hong Kong Island, Hong Kong
- Agency executives: Carol Yip Man-kuen, Director of the Chief Executive's Office; Daniel Cheng Chung-wai, Permanent Secretary for the Chief Executive's Office

Office of the Chief Executive
- Traditional Chinese: 行政長官辦公室
Transcriptions
Yue: Cantonese
- Yale Romanization: Hàhng jing jéung gūn baahn gūng sāt
- Jyutping: Hang4 zing3 zoeng2 gun1 baan6 gung1 sat1

The Office of the Chief Executive (CEO) is a government agency that supports the work of the Chief Executive of Hong Kong. It consists of the chief executive's closest political aides and support staff who run the Government House, the Executive Council, and the chief executive's press office. The current director of the office is Carol Yip, who was appointed in 2022 and is the first woman to serve in the position.

== History ==
Historically, the governor's office consisted of a private office staffed by civil servants, a spokesman, two personal advisers brought from the UK, the Central Policy Unit, bodyguards from the Royal Hong Kong Police Force, and an aide-de-camp. The governor's wife additionally had a social secretary.

The Chief Executive's Office in its current form was created on 16 December 1996, shortly after the election of Tung Chee-hwa as Chief Executive in the 1996 election. The office took over the governor's establishment upon the transfer of sovereignty on 1 July 1997.

== Location ==
Prior to the transfer of sovereignty over Hong Kong, the Governor's office was located in the Government House, which served as the official residence and office for 25 of Hong Kong's 28 governors. After the Handover in 1997, the first Chief Executive of Hong Kong, Tung Chee Hwa, chose not to reside in the Government House, citing the "crowded" environment and "bad feng shui". He moved his office to the fifth floor of the main wing of the Central Government Offices (now known as Justice Place), which at the time housed the offices of the Chief Secretary and Financial Secretary. The move took place in December 1997, with Tung renting office space in the Asia Pacific Finance Tower from July to December 1997.

When Donald Tsang assumed office in June 2005, he decided to reside in the Government House again and initiated a months-long remodelling of the residence. In January 2006, the office relocated back to the Government House.

In 2002, the Executive Council under Tung Chee-hwa approved plans to construct a set of new offices for the government, which was outgrowing its premises in the Murray Building, Central Government Offices and Legislative Council Building. The new Central Government Complex was completed in 2011, which included a dedicated building for the Chief Executive's office. The office moved into the new building on 8 August 2011 and has remained there since.

== Organisation ==
The office is led by the director, who is a political appointee. The office's civil service establishment is led by the permanent secretary, who oversees the branches that cover the various areas of work carried out by the office:

| Division | Officials | Incumbent | Remarks |
|---|---|---|---|
| Private Office | Private Secretary to the Chief Executive: Deputy Private Secretary; Chief Official Languages Officer; Assistant Private Secretaries | Vicki Kwok Wong Wing Ki JP | The private secretary was the most senior civil servant in the office until 1998. |
| Press Office | Information Coordinator: Assistant Director (Media); Principal Information Officer; Press Secretary (ExCo) | | |
| Executive Council | Clerk to the Executive Council | | |
| Administration | Chief Executive Officer (Administration): Senior Executive Officer (Adm) 1; Executive Officer (Government House); Housekeeper; Senior Executive Officer (Adm) 2; Social Secretary; Executive Officer (Adm) | | |

A small number of other officials in charge of running Government House and the Chief Executive's office are also attached to the Office. A superintendent of police serves as the Chief Executive's aide-de-camp.

== Agency executives ==
=== Directors ===
The director of the office is a political appointee ranked at directorate pay scale point 8, equivalent to a secretary of a policy bureau. The director serves as the Chief Executive's chief of staff.

Political party: Nonpartisan

| № | Portrait | Name | Term of office | | Duration | Chief Executive | Term | Ref |
|---|---|---|---|---|---|---|---|---|
| 1 | | Lam Woon-kwong 林煥光 | 1 July 2002 | 6 January 2005 | 2 years, 189 days | Tung Chee-hwa (1997–2005) | 2 | |
| Vacant | | | | | | Tung Chee-hwa (1997–2005) | 2 | |
| Vacant | | | | | | Donald Tsang (2005–2012) | 2 | |
| 2 | | John Tsang Chun-wah 曾俊華 | 24 January 2006 | 30 June 2007 | 1 year, 157 days | Donald Tsang (2005–2012) | 2 | |
| 3 | | Norman Chan Tak-lam 陳德霖 | 1 July 2007 | 31 July 2009 | 2 years, 30 days | Donald Tsang (2005–2012) | 3 | |
| 4 | | Raymond Tam Chi-yuen 譚志源 | 1 August 2009 | 29 September 2011 | 2 years, 59 days | Donald Tsang (2005–2012) | 3 | |
| 5 | | Gabriel Matthew Leung 梁卓偉 | 30 September 2011 | 30 June 2012 | 274 days | Donald Tsang (2005–2012) | 3 | |
| 6 | | Edward Yau Tang-wah 邱騰華 | 1 July 2012 | 30 June 2017 | 4 years, 364 days | Leung Chun-ying (2012–2017) | 4 | |
| 7 | | Eric Chan Kwok-ki 陳國基 | 1 July 2017 | 30 June 2022 | 4 years, 364 days | Carrie Lam (2017–2022) | 5 | |
| 8 | | Carol Yip Man-kuen 葉文娟 | 1 July 2022 | Incumbent | 4 years, 39 days | John Lee (2022–present) | 6 | |

=== Deputy Director ===
- Richard Yuen, JP (March 2003 – October 2003)

=== Permanent Secretary ===
The permanent secretary is the most senior civil servant at the office. The position is ranked at directorate pay scale point 6, which is lower than the permanent secretaries of the various policy bureaux, who are ranked at point 8.

- Andrew Wong, JP (August 2005– January 2006)
- Chang King-yiu, JP (February 2006– October 2007)
- Elizabeth Tse, JP (October 2007 – April 2010)
- Kenneth Mak, JP (April 2010 – June 2012)
- Alice Lau, JP (July 2012 – June 2017)
- Jessie Ting, JP (July 2017 – August 2019)
- Shirley Lam, JP (September 2019 – June 2022)
- Daniel Cheng, JP (July 2022 – Incumbent)

=== Information Coordinator ===
- Stephen Lam, GBS, JP (January 1999 – June 2002)
- Andy Ho (13 February 2006 – 30 June 2012)
- June Tang (1 July 2012 – 31 July 2013)
- Andrew Fung (16 December 2013 – 30 June 2017)

Information Coordinator was created by Tung Chee Hwa after the transfer of sovereignty over Hong Kong, prior to the transfer, press release was handle by Information Services Department.

=== Special Assistant (defunct) ===
- Gary Chan (2006–2008)
- Ronald Chan (2010–2012)

== Tuesday petitions ==
Traditionally, the Chief Executive would receive petitions outside his or her office every Tuesday before the weekly meeting of the Executive Council. The practice was suspended by Carrie Lam on 31 March 2020 to prevent the spread of the coronavirus and has not been revived since, with her successor John Lee stating in 2023 that there was no need to do so as there were already many channels for the government to receive feedback.

== Controversies ==
After the National Security Law was passed, the Chief Executive's Office told Apple Daily that it would reveal the list of designated judges for national security cases, but in January 2021, Apple Daily revealed that the Chief Executive's Office had broken its promise and cited confidentiality.

In August 2022, after Nancy Pelosi visited Taiwan, John Lee criticised the visit and vowed that "The Hong Kong government would fully support and facilitate all necessary measures by Beijing to safeguard national sovereignty and territorial integrity." After mainland China suspended imports from hundreds of food factories in Taiwan, the Office of the Chief Executive was asked whether Hong Kong would do the same, and the Office said it had nothing to add.

== See also ==
- List of Hong Kong government agencies
- Chief Executive's Office (building):Office of the Chief Executive Building
