= Lung Shing (constituency) =

Hong Kong constituency

- 龍城
- Elected constituency for the Kowloon City District Council
- Boundary of Lung Shing in Kowloon City District
- District: Kowloon City
- Legislative Council constituency: Kowloon Central
- Population: 15,498 (2019)
- Electorate: 5,824 (2019)

Current constituency
- Created: 1988
- Number of members: One
- Member: Ng Po-keung (DAB)

Lung Shing (Chinese: 龍城) is one of the 24 constituencies in the Kowloon City District of Hong Kong which was created in 1988.

The constituency has an estimated population of 15,498.

== Councillors represented ==
=== 1988 to 1991 ===
Election	First Member	First Party	Second Member	Second Party
1988	Ng Siu-peng	Independent	Lee Cheuk-fan	Independent

=== 1991 to present ===
Election	Member	Party
1991	Lee Cheuk-fan	Independent
199?	Lee Cheuk-fan	Liberal
2003	Lee Kin-kan	ADPL
2007	Ng Po-keung	DAB/FTU

== Election results ==
=== 2010s ===
Kowloon City District Council Election, 2019: Lung Shing
Party	Candidate	Votes	%	±%
DAB	Ng Po-keung	1,983	49.97	
Nonpartisan	Frankie Fung Tat-chun	1,884	47.48	
Nonpartisan	Fong Ngai-yin	101	2.55	
Majority		99	2.49	
Turnout		3,983	68.45	
DAB hold		Swing		
