= Tamar, Hong Kong =

Area in Admiralty, Hong Kong

Coordinates: 22°16′50.85″N 114°9′56.08″E

Tamar
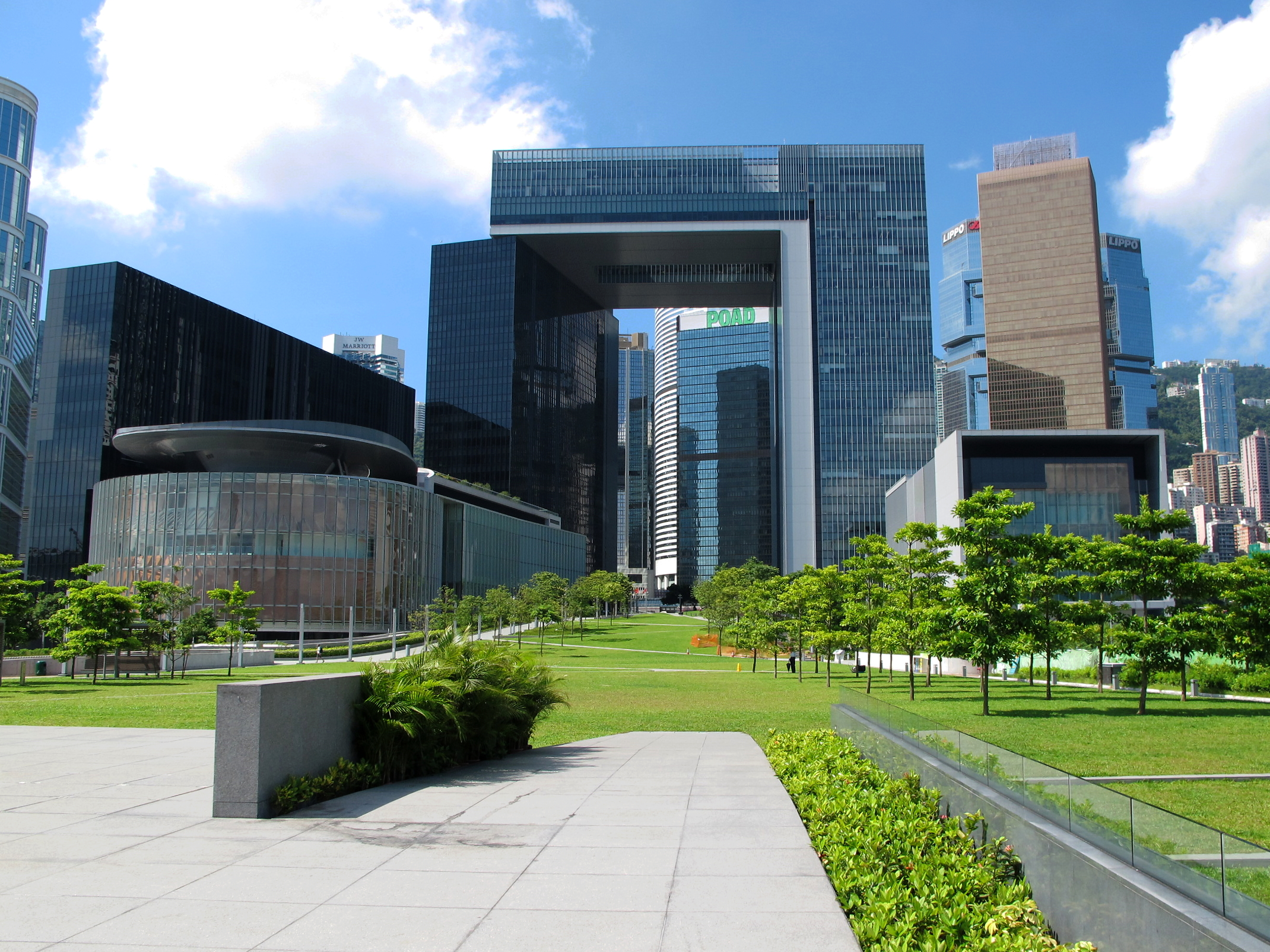
- The Central Government Complex at Tamar
- Traditional Chinese: 添馬
- Simplified Chinese: 添马
- Cantonese Yale: Tīmmáh
Transcriptions
Standard Mandarin
- Hanyu Pinyin: Tiānmǎ
- Bopomofo: ㄊㄧㄢ ㄇㄚˇ
- IPA: [tʰjɛ́n.mà]
Wu
- Wugniu: thie^{1} mo^{4}
- IPA: Shanghainese: [tʰi˥ mo˧]
Yue: Cantonese
- Yale Romanization: Tīmmáh
- Jyutping: tim^{1} maa^{5}
- IPA: [tʰim˥.ma˩˧]

Alternative Chinese name
- Traditional Chinese: 添馬艦
- Simplified Chinese: 添马舰
- Cantonese Yale: Tīmmáhlaahm
Transcriptions
Standard Mandarin
- Hanyu Pinyin: Tiānmǎjiàn
Wu
- Wugniu: thie^{1} mo^{4} khae^{1}
- IPA: Shanghainese: [tʰi˥ mo˧ kʰe˨]
Yue: Cantonese
- Yale Romanization: Tīmmáhlaahm
- Jyutping: tim^{1} maa^{5} laam^{6}

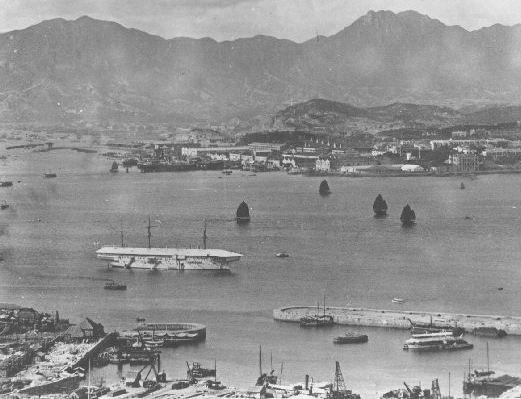
HMS Tamar (white vessel) anchored off the Naval Dockyard (1905)

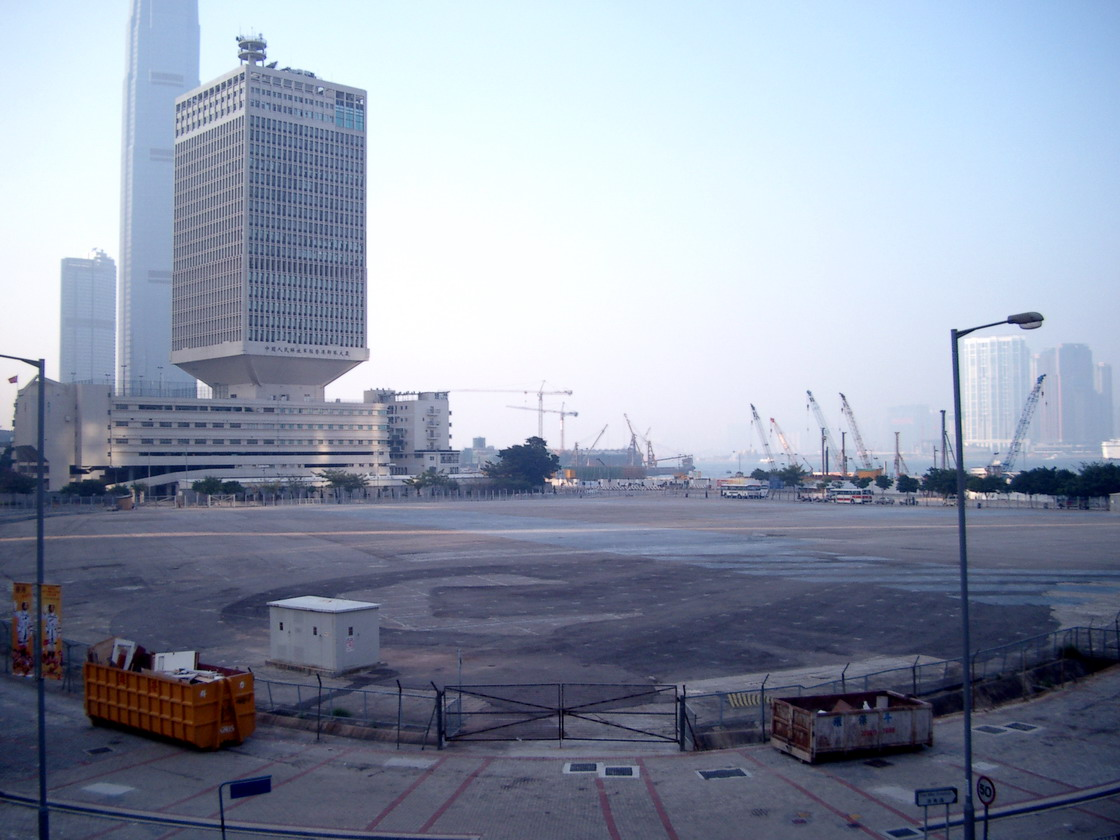
Tamar site in 2005, PLA headquarters in background

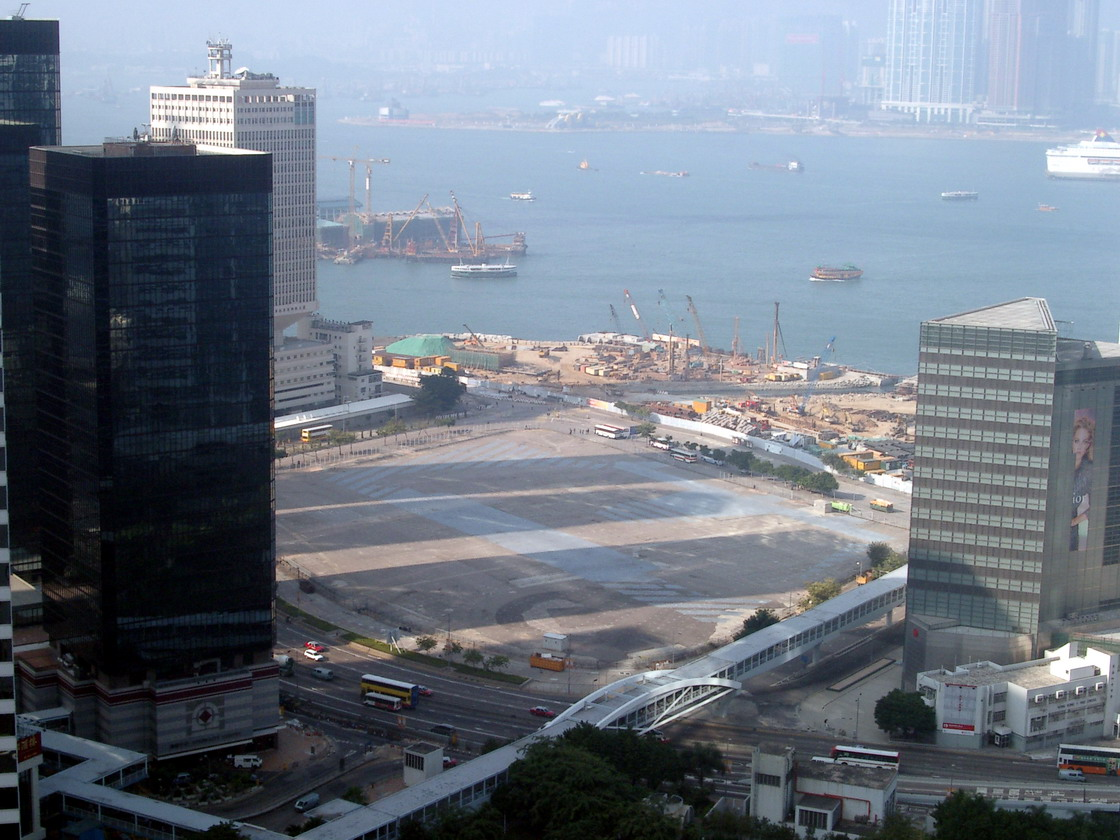
Panorama of Tamar site in 2005.

Tamar (/ˈteɪmɑːr/ TAY-mar; Chinese: 添馬) is the administrative centre of Hong Kong located in Admiralty. The headquarters of Hong Kong's Legislative Council and Central Government are located in Tamar. Adjacent to the island's financial heart at the Central harbourfront, the word Tamar is often used as a metonymy for the Government of Hong Kong.

To the east, it connects with cultural and convention facilities including the Hong Kong Convention and Exhibition Centre; to the south, it connects with financial, commercial and tourism hubs; to the southwest, it connects to Garden Road, which is rich in historical and heritage values.

Once the most expensive piece of empty land in Hong Kong, valued at $24.3 billion on the market ($9,000 per square foot), the site attracted projects from different parties, including the government's new headquarters, highly profitable office or retailing space, and a waterfront open green space. Due to its modern usage, the term is used synonymously to the territory's legislative council and administration.

== History ==
HMS Tamar was a British naval vessel which arrived in Hong Kong in 1897 and remained in the British territory until the Japanese occupation of Hong Kong during World War II in 1941. In keeping with British naval regulations, in which only naval personnel allocated to a vessel came under naval discipline, HMS Tamar became the nominal depot ship of the British naval garrison and gave its name to the stone frigate, "HMS Tamar". The British garrison pre-handover was stationed at the Prince of Wales Building within the base, which is part of the site.

== Past uses ==
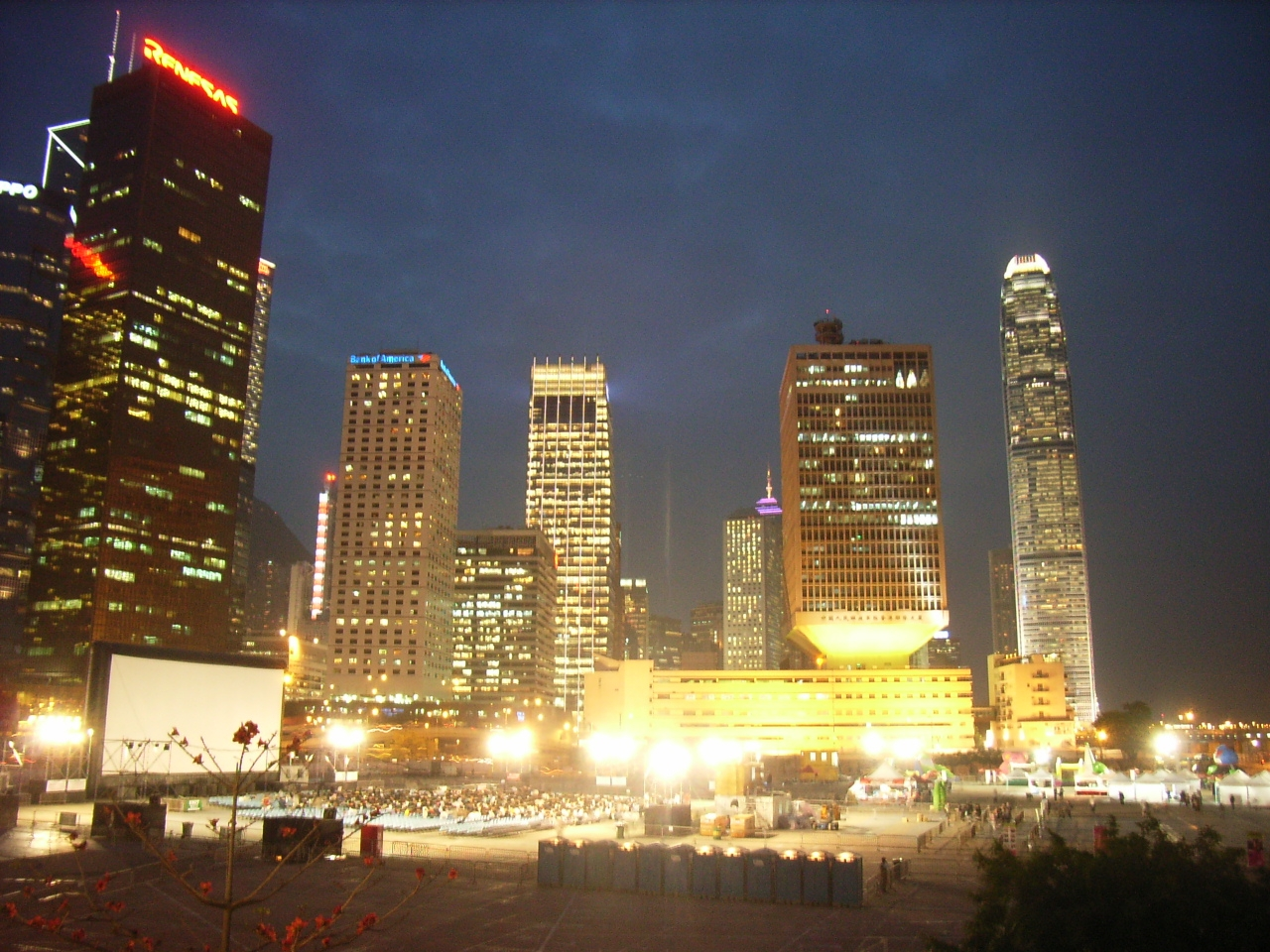
An event of HKIFF 2006 in Tamar site

A number of large-scale functions including expos and musical or theatrical performances had been staged at the Tamar site before. A few examples are Saltimbanco by Cirque Du Soleil, the annual Hong Kong Product Expo, the Hong Kong International Film Festival and the ill-fated "Harbour Fest". The entire site has played host to a funfair in 2005 and 2006.

=== Concert venue ===
The Tamar site has been a target of strong criticism by the public for its poor record of music events. In 2003, the Hong Kong government made plans to create a major concert event to help Hong Kong out of the economic crisis brought about by the SARS epidemic, naming it "Harbour Fest". The event took heavy criticism as it was considered "extremely poor organization". On 25 October 2003, Irish vocal pop band Westlife held a concert for their Unbreakable Tour supporting their album Unbreakable - The Greatest Hits Vol. 1.

=== Vehicle processing centre ===
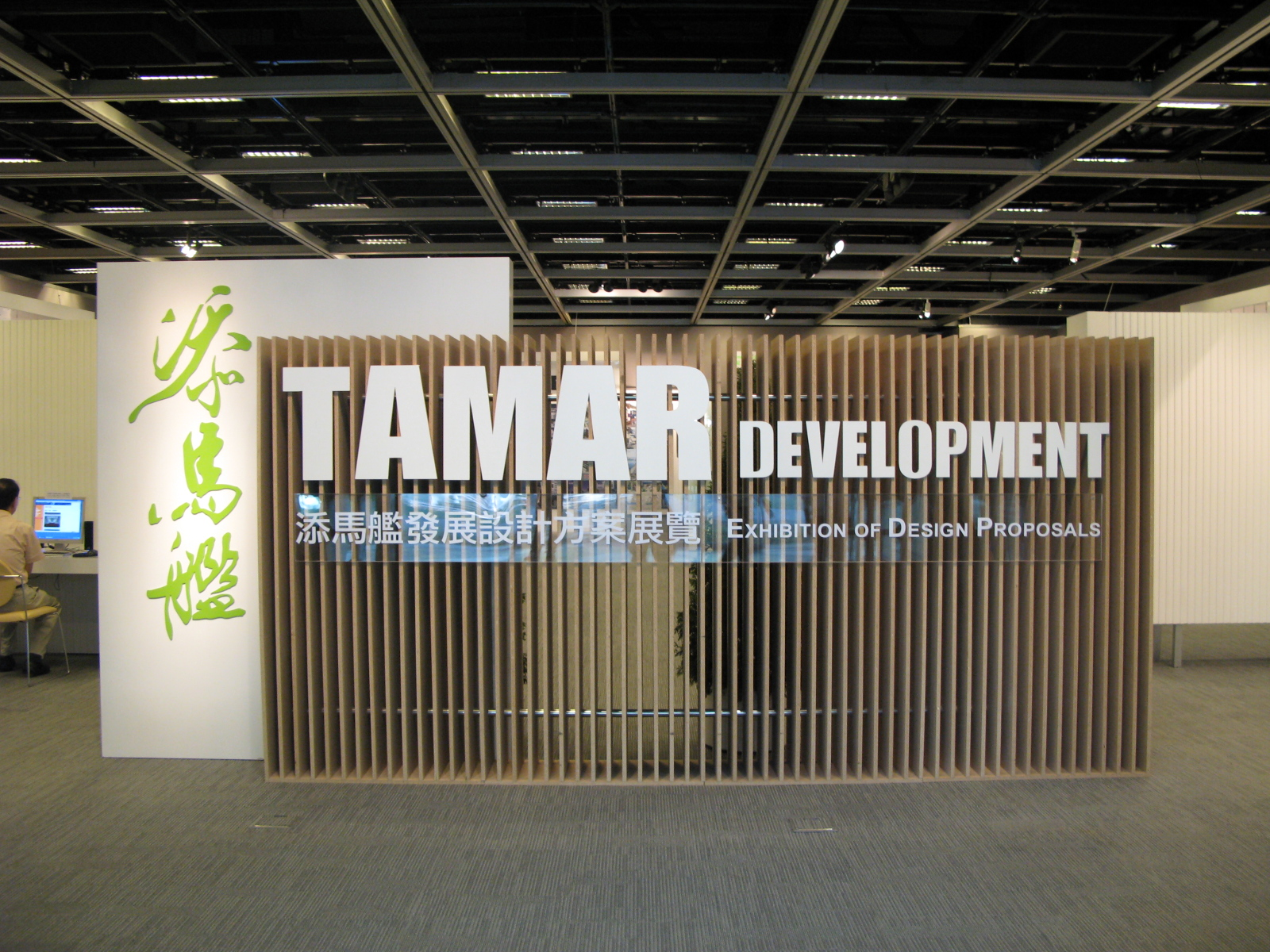
Tamar Development Proposal Exhibit in 2007

The Tamar site was one of the protest sites suggested by members of the Hong Kong People's Alliance on WTO, a non-governmental organisation (NGO) that represents dozens of organisations heading to Hong Kong to protest the WTO Ministerial Conference of 2005. The Tamar site was suggested since the Hong Kong Convention and Exhibition Centre, where the conference was to be held, is visible from it.

However, the government turned down this suggestion and instead the site was used exclusively as a vehicle processing centre during the conference. Over 1,000 vehicles travelled to and from the conference venue on a daily basis. All vehicles and their drivers and passengers had to go through screening at the Tamar Site for security verification before being allowed to enter the conference venue.

== Current use ==
=== Government offices ===
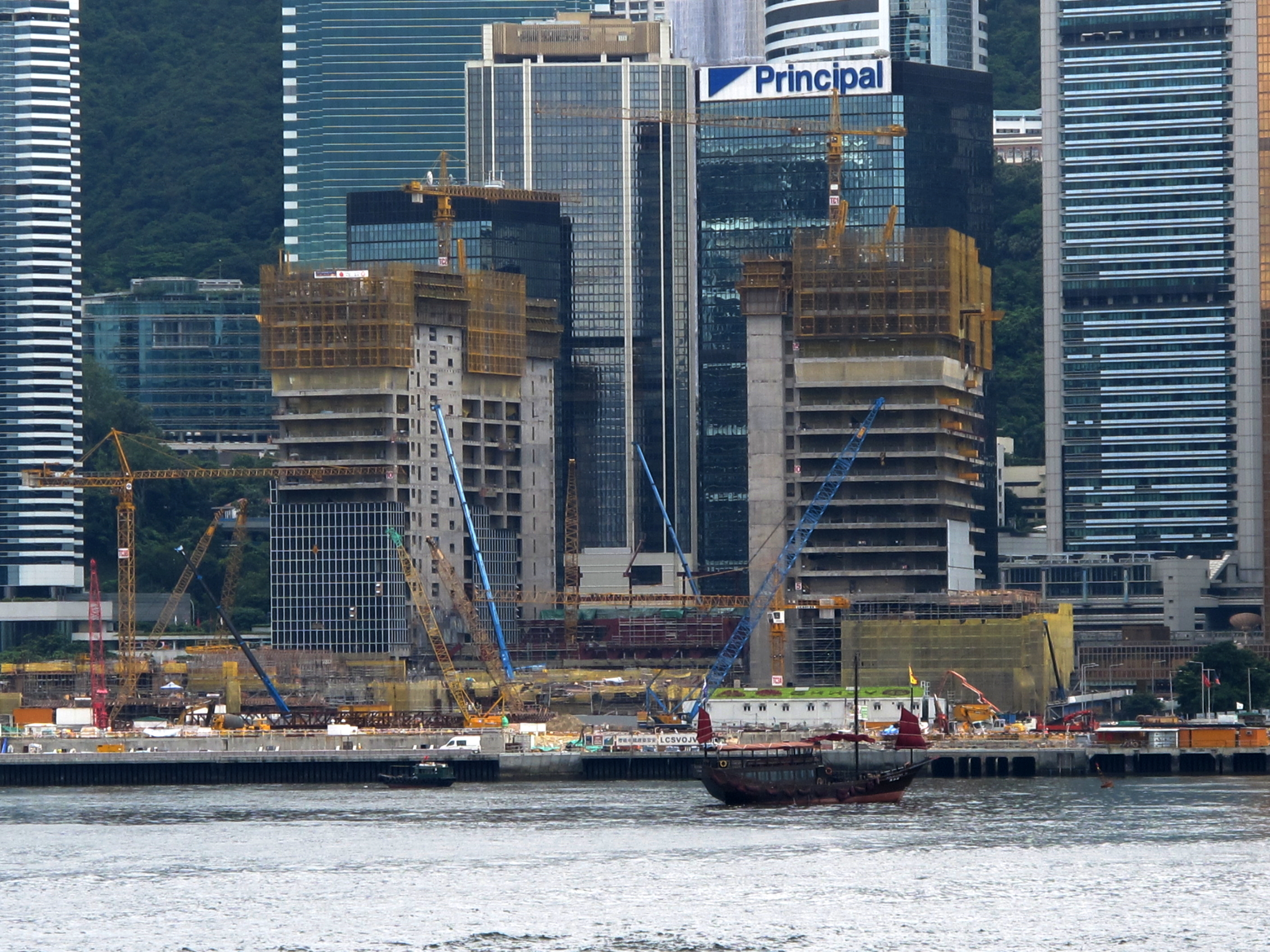
The new Central Government Offices under construction in June 2010.

The Hong Kong government relocated the Central Government Offices (formerly located at Government Hill), the Legislative Council and the Chief Executive's Office to the Central Government Complex. The government halted the Tamar project development in November 2003 because of the tough economic climate during the SARS outbreak.

Two hectares of the 4.2-hectare site was reserved for use as recreational open space in the $5.2-billion development plan; this space is now a public park, known as Tamar Park. The rest of the site accommodates the new government buildings. Most offices of the government bureaux (collaboratively called the Government Secretariat) were moved from various locations into the new complex, as well as the Legislative Council of Hong Kong. The council chambers abandoned the traditional British layout, with benches facing each other, favouring instead a seating arrangement similar to the Congress Hall of the Great Hall of the People in Beijing, a tiered semi circle with the speaker at its centre.

In order to ensure the buildings behind the site such as the Far East Finance Centre, the Admiralty Centre, Lippo Centre, the United Centre, Pacific Place Offices Towers, Island Shangri-La and the Conrad Hotel continue to have views of the harbour, the height of the government buildings was restricted to 130-180mPD.

The government also decided to cut an exhibition gallery from the project. In 2004, the government had promised the Trade Development Council that they would be able to rent the grounds as a temporary venue for mega fairs twice a year, for a total of three years. Originally the Hong Kong Gifts & Premium Fair and the Hong Kong Electronics Fair were to have exhibits at the Tamar site once a year, with the plan to become Asia's largest sourcing fair. The government decided to cut out the use for exhibitions in order to lower the development intensity of the site and to alleviate effects on transport infrastructure arising from the project.

The contract for the project was signed on 28 January and work started in mid-February 2008, and finished in 2011. The project engaged 3,000 workers.

A flag-raising ceremony was held on the morning of Monday 1 August 2011, to mark the event with staff from the Commerce, Industry and Tourism Branch of the Commerce and Economic Development Bureau having the honour of being first to move into new offices at Tamar.

=== Criticism ===
Groups like the Hong Kong Institute of Planners did not think the Tamar site should be made into a government complex. Because of the Tamar site's unique location, connecting cultural, financial and tourist facilities, they believed it should be used for political, economic, cultural and entertainment purposes instead of as a government complex.

== See also ==
- Southorn Playground
- Central–Wan Chai Bypass, which goes directly under the Tamar site
