= Tamar Park =

Waterfront park in Admiralty, Hong Kong

- 添馬公園
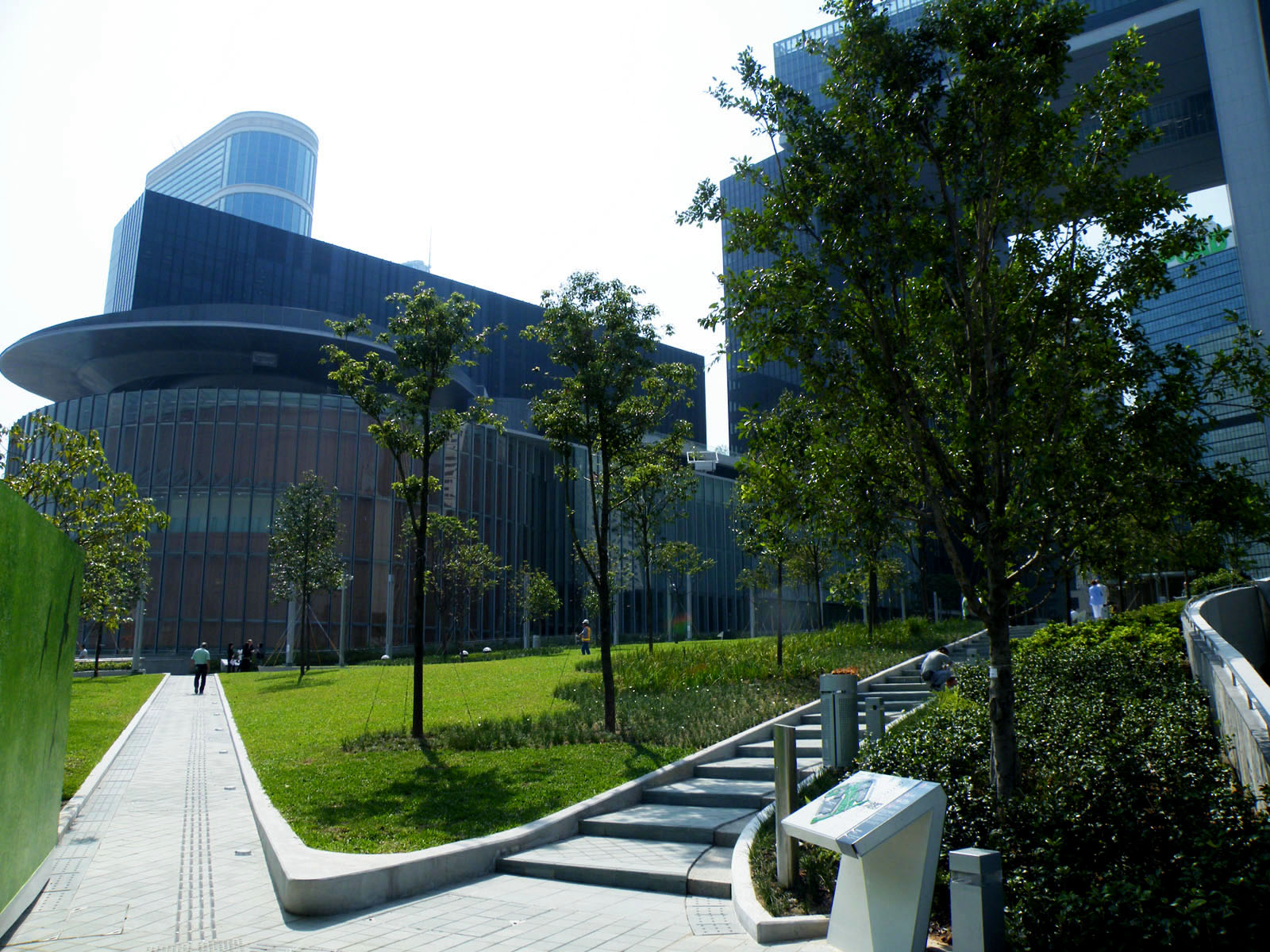
- Viewing of Legislative Council Complex
- Interactive map of Tamar Park
- Type: Public park
- Location: Harcourt Road, Admiralty, Hong Kong
- Coordinates: 22.28161°N 114.1656°E
- Area: 20,490 sqm^{2}
- Opened: 10 October 2011; 14 years ago
- Operator: Leisure and Cultural Services Department
- Status: Built and open to public

Chinese name
- Traditional Chinese: 添馬公園
- Simplified Chinese: 添马公园
Transcriptions
Standard Mandarin
- Hanyu Pinyin: Tiānmǎ gōngyuán
- Bopomofo: ㄊㄧㄢ ㄇㄚˇ ㄍㄨㄥ ㄩㄢˊ
Yue: Cantonese
- Jyutping: tim^{1} maa^{5} gung^{1} jyun^{4}

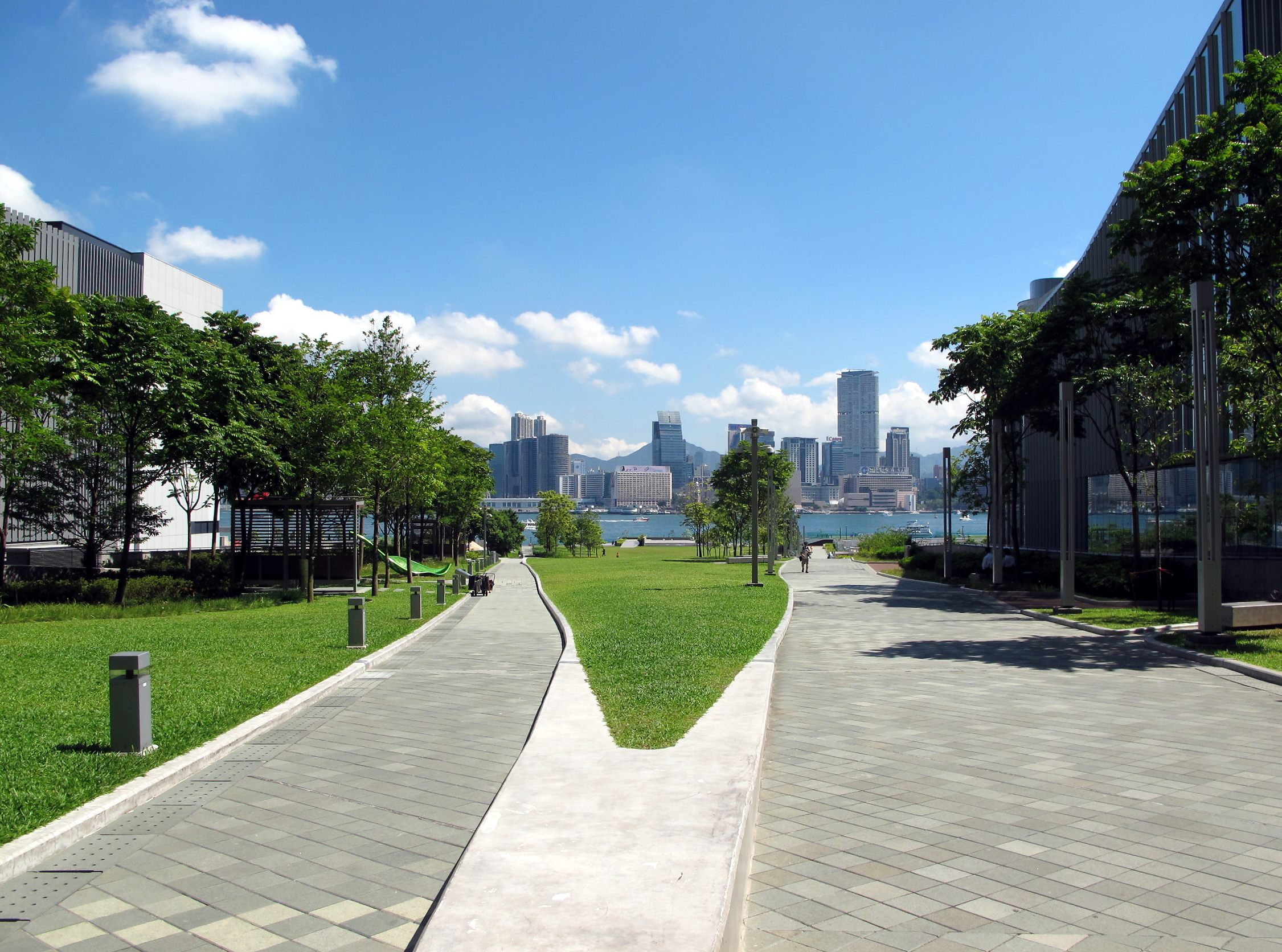
Lawn of Tamar Park

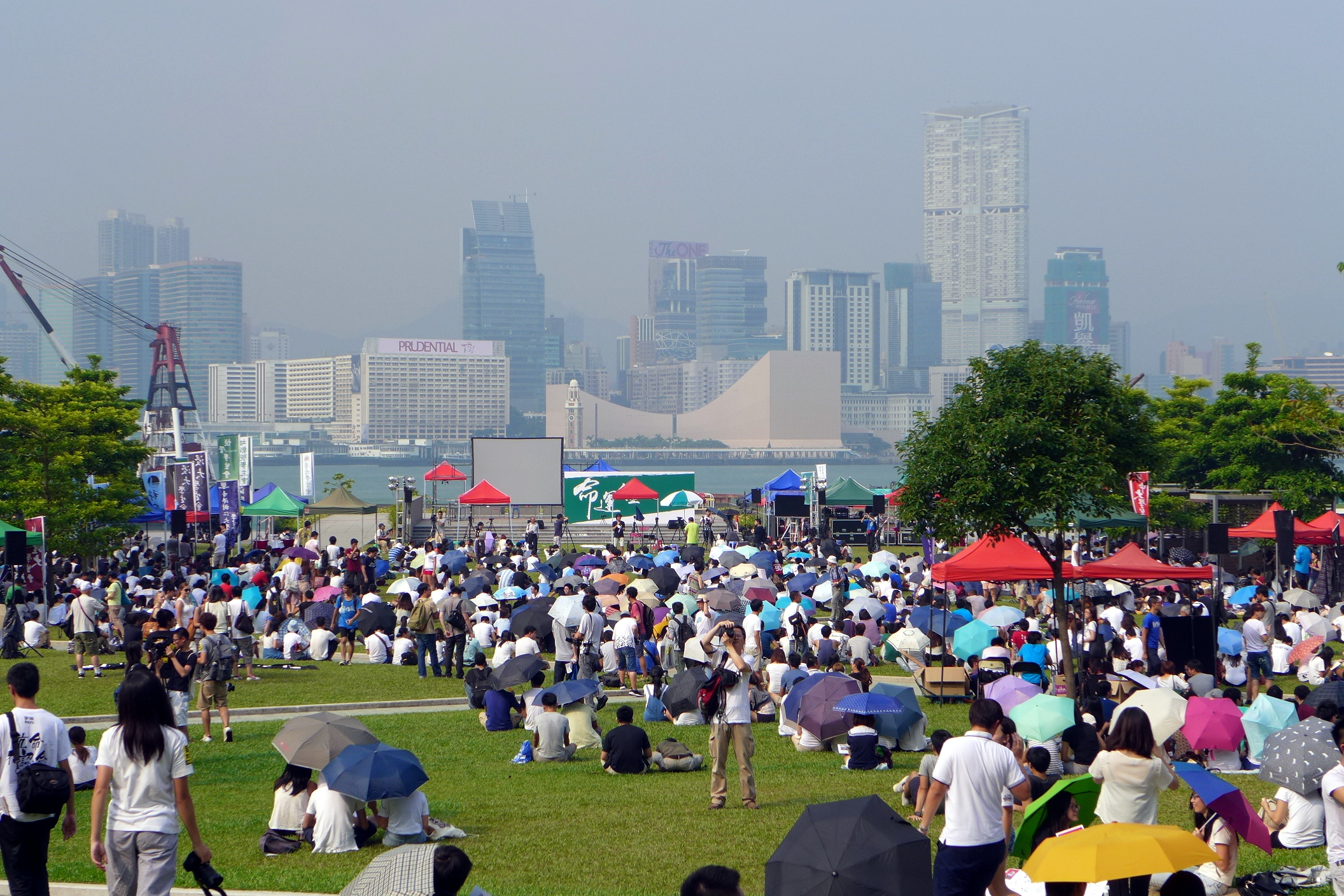
Tamar Park under Hong Kong class boycott campaign in 2014

Tamar Park (Chinese: 添馬公園) is an urban park in Admiralty, Hong Kong covering around 17,000 square metres (180,000 sq ft) with the design concept of 'perpetual green'. The park occupies 80% of the Tamar site public space and is managed by the Leisure and Cultural Services Department of the Hong Kong government. It is enclosed by Harcourt Road, Legislative Council Road, Tim Mei Avenue, Tim Wa Avenue and Lung Wo Road. The Central Government Complex and the Legislative Council Complex are adjacent to Tamar Park.

== History ==
The Tamar Development Project was restarted when Hong Kong chief executive Donald Tsang announced in his policy address for the financial year 2006 that Hong Kong's Central Government Offices, Legislative Council Building and the Office of the Chief Executive would be relocated to Tamar site, Admiralty.

Hong Kong Government announced four design plans for the construction of the new headquarters of the Government on 26 March 2007. One of the design plans which is named as "Tamar for Public (公眾的添馬)" suggested the space constructs for public with the theory of "Land always Green (地常綠)", and it would be connected to Wanchai Waterfront Promenade when the public area is built. This suggested design was finally accepted by the Government. The project began construction in February 2008 and the topping-out ceremony hosted on 25 January 2011.

Whilst the opening ceremony of the Central Government Offices was hosted by the Vice Premier of the People's Republic of China Li Keqiang on 18 August 2011 and moving on-site started, Tamar Park opened to public on 10 October that year.

== Facilities ==
The park has a small amphitheatre with a wooden performance area and seating for about 240 people. There is also a water feature and a gallery/cafe, iBakery Gallery Café, operated by Tung Wah Group of Hospitals. The Park is planted with Axonopus compressus for the grass, and planted Chukrasia tabularis, Michelia chapensis, Cinnamomum camphora, Bauhinia variegata, Ficus microcarpa and Bauhinia blakeana which is the floral emblem of Hong Kong and 400 different varieties.

== Public sculpture and facilities ==
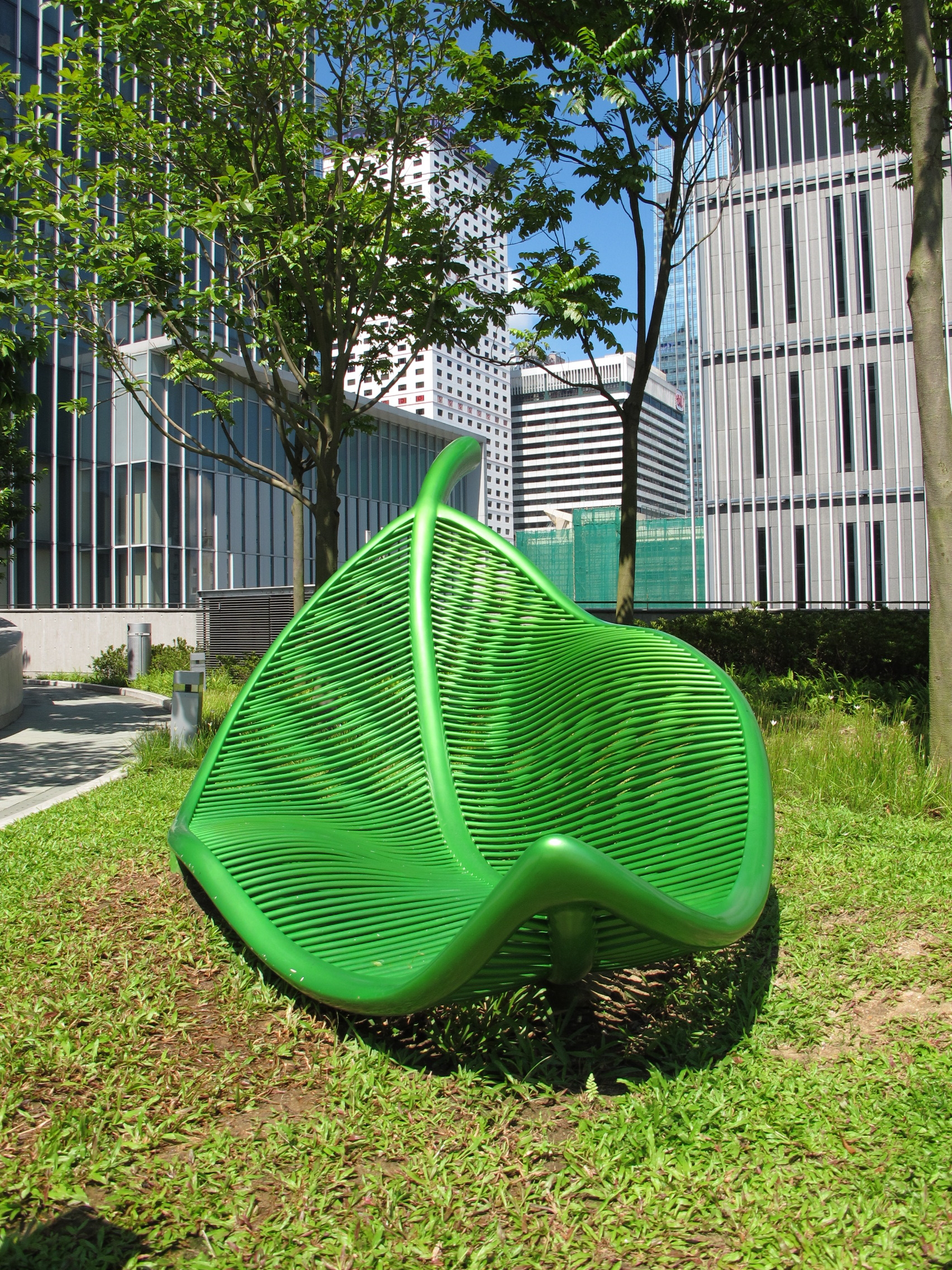
Photosynthesis in Motion

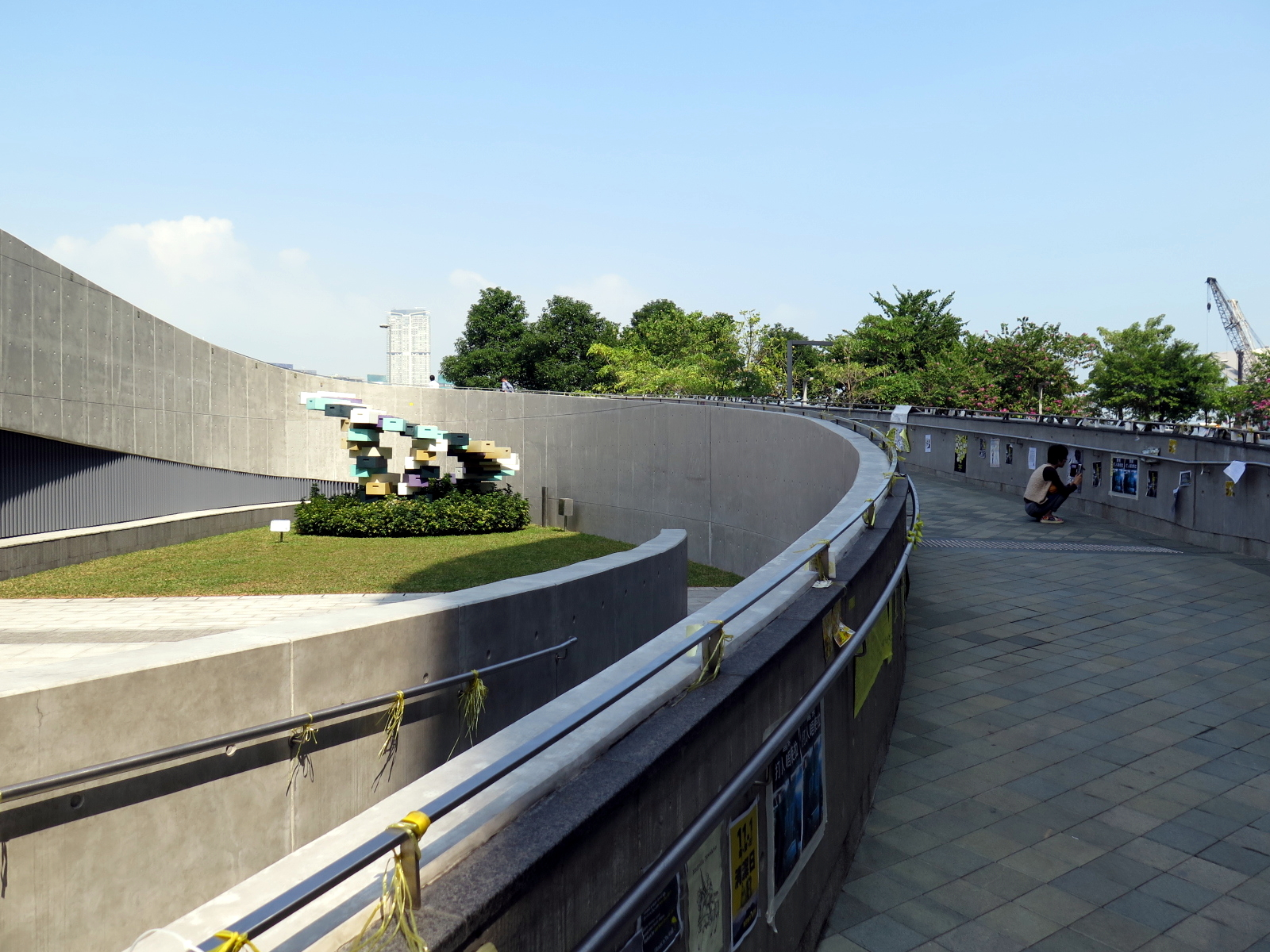
Sculpture Court Fruit Market

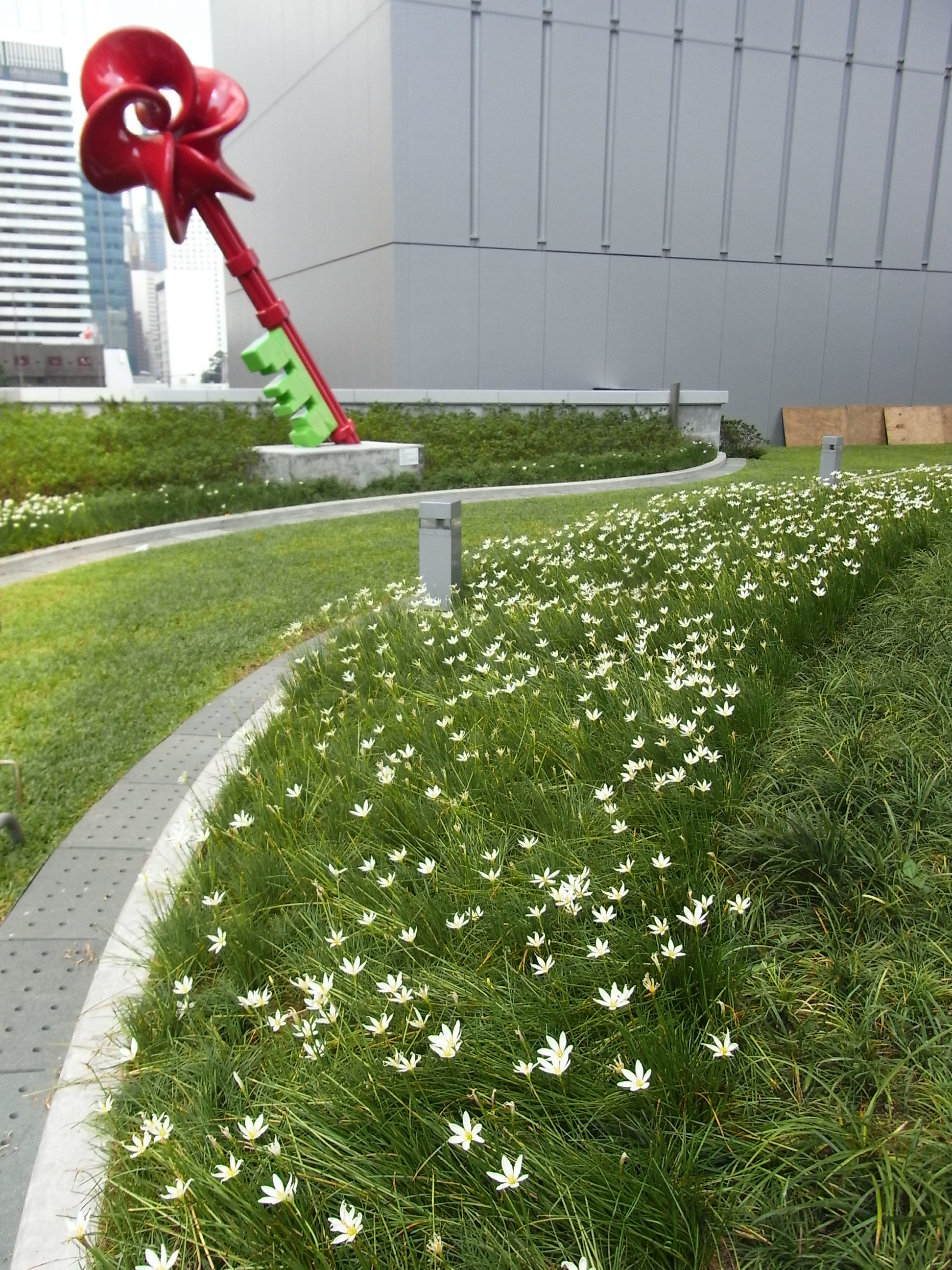
red sculpture Key

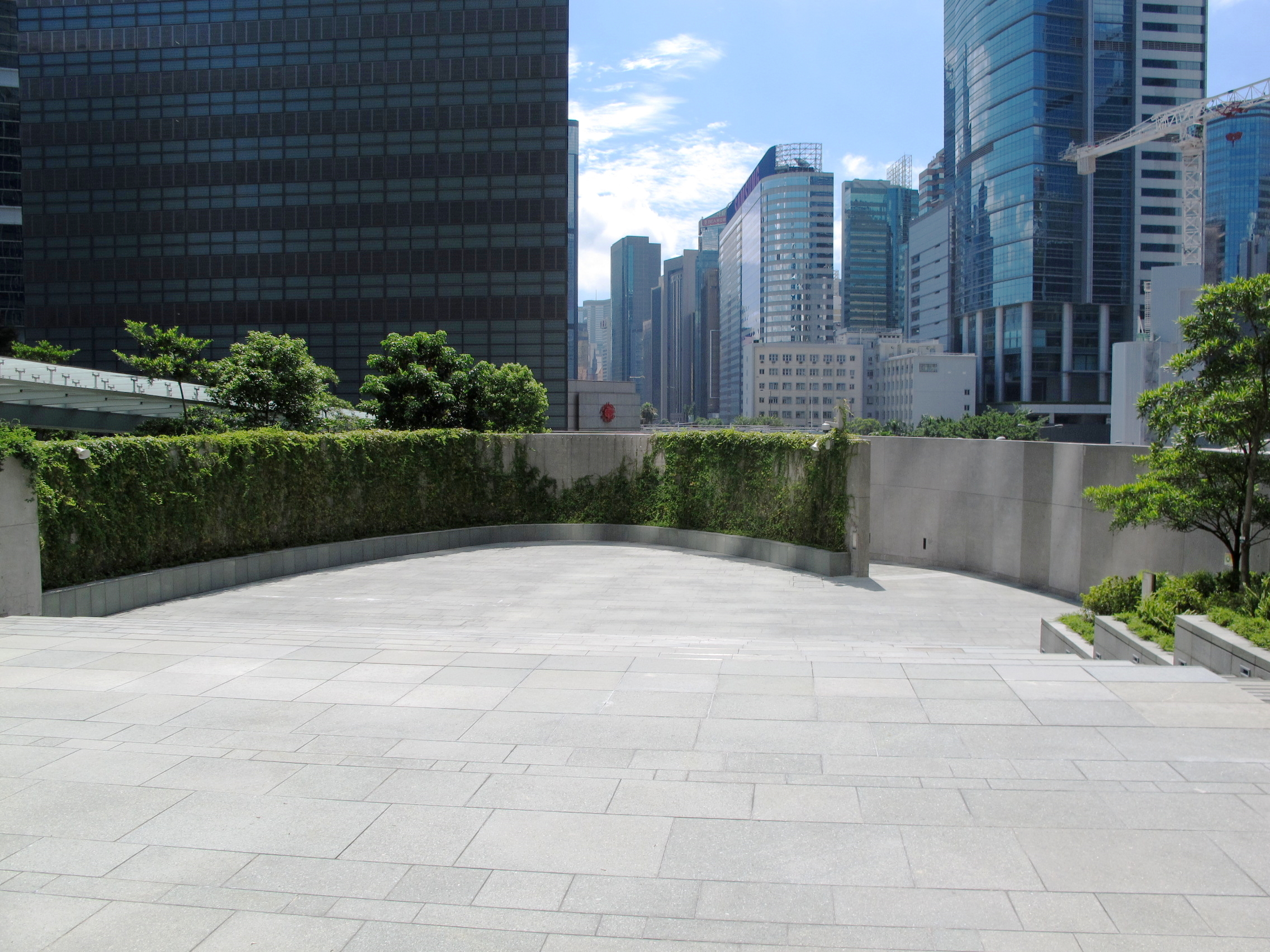
Tamar Amphitheatre

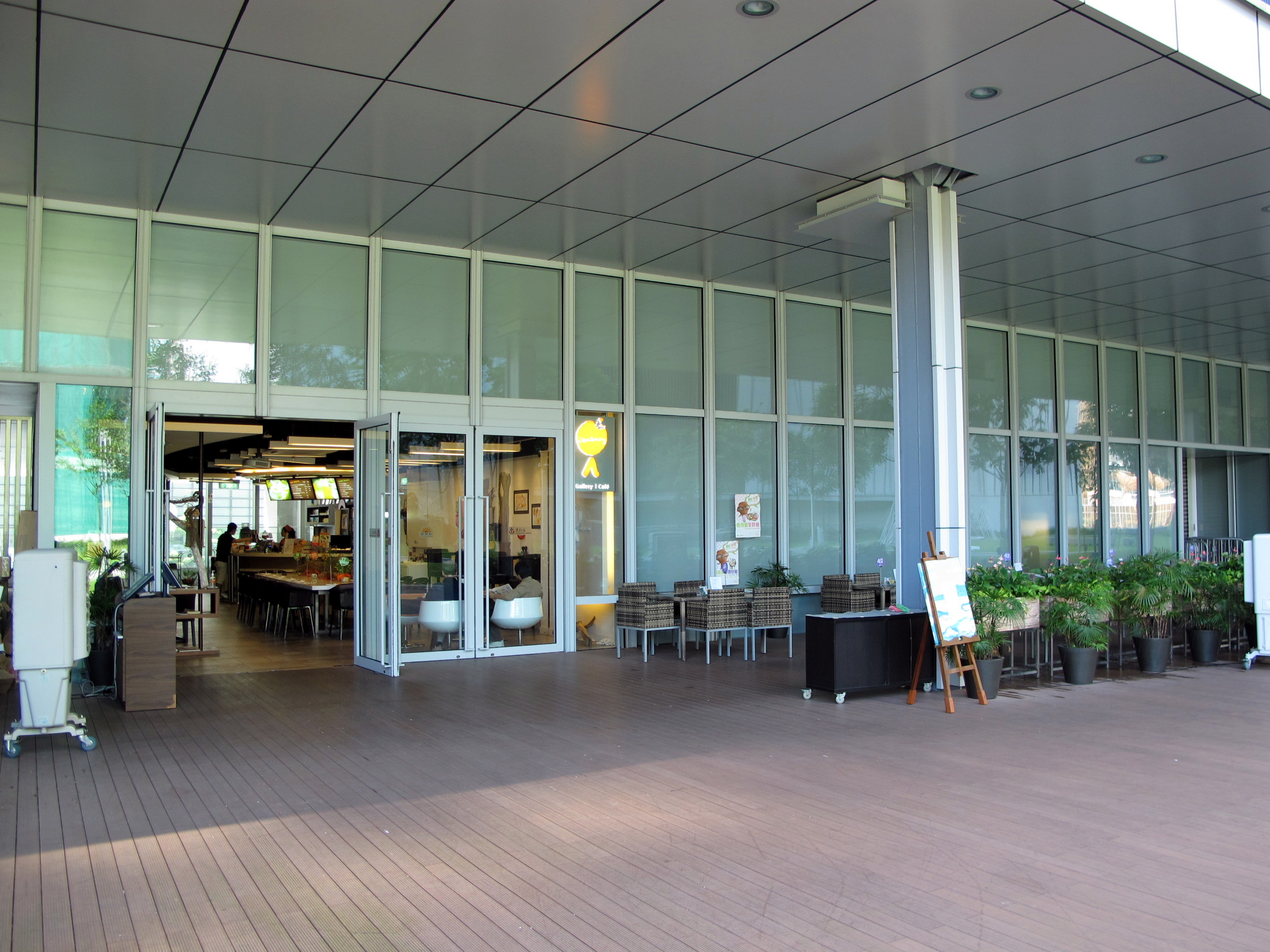
IBakery Gallery Cafe in Tamar Park

== Buildings ==
Buildings in the park

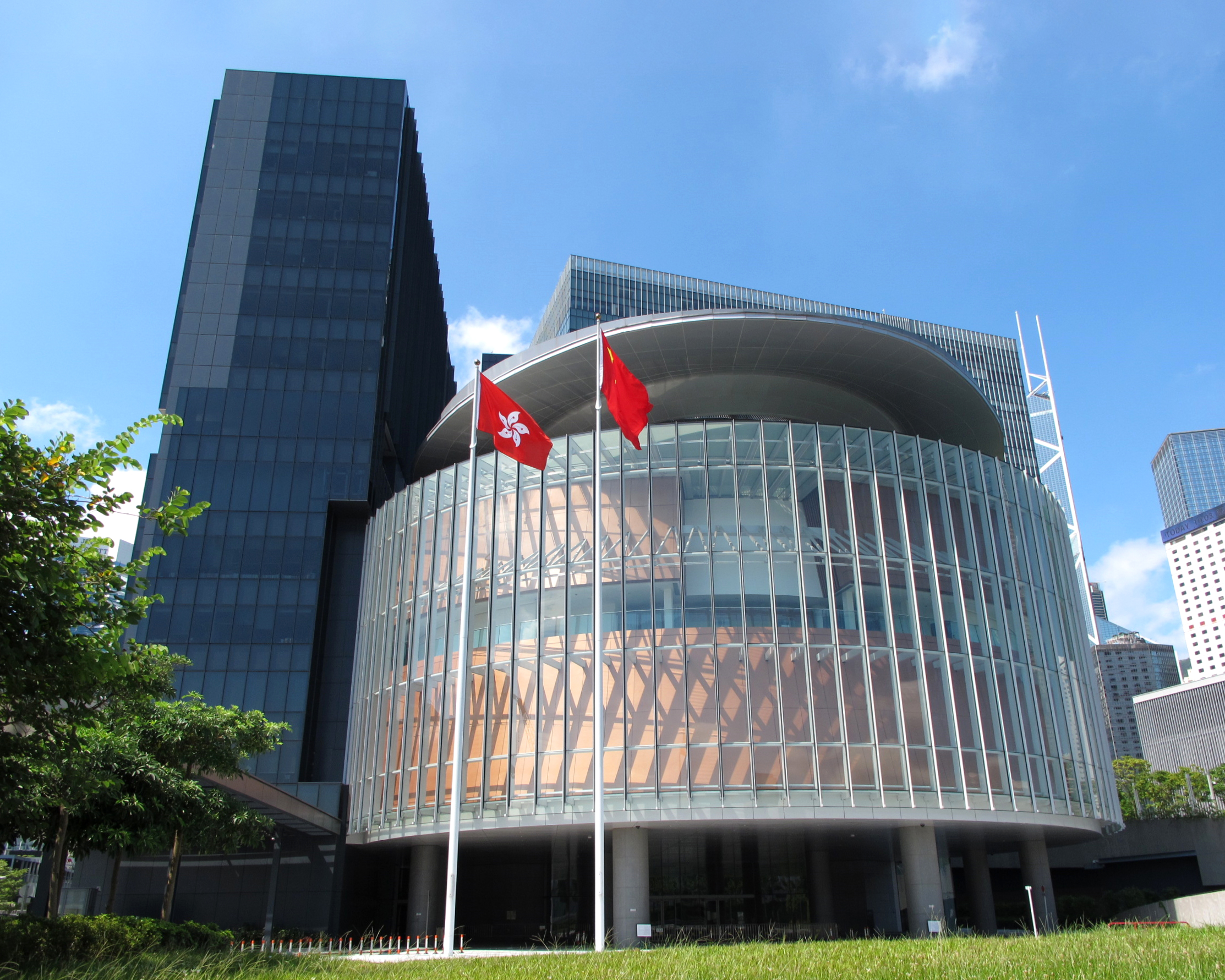
Legislative Council Complex

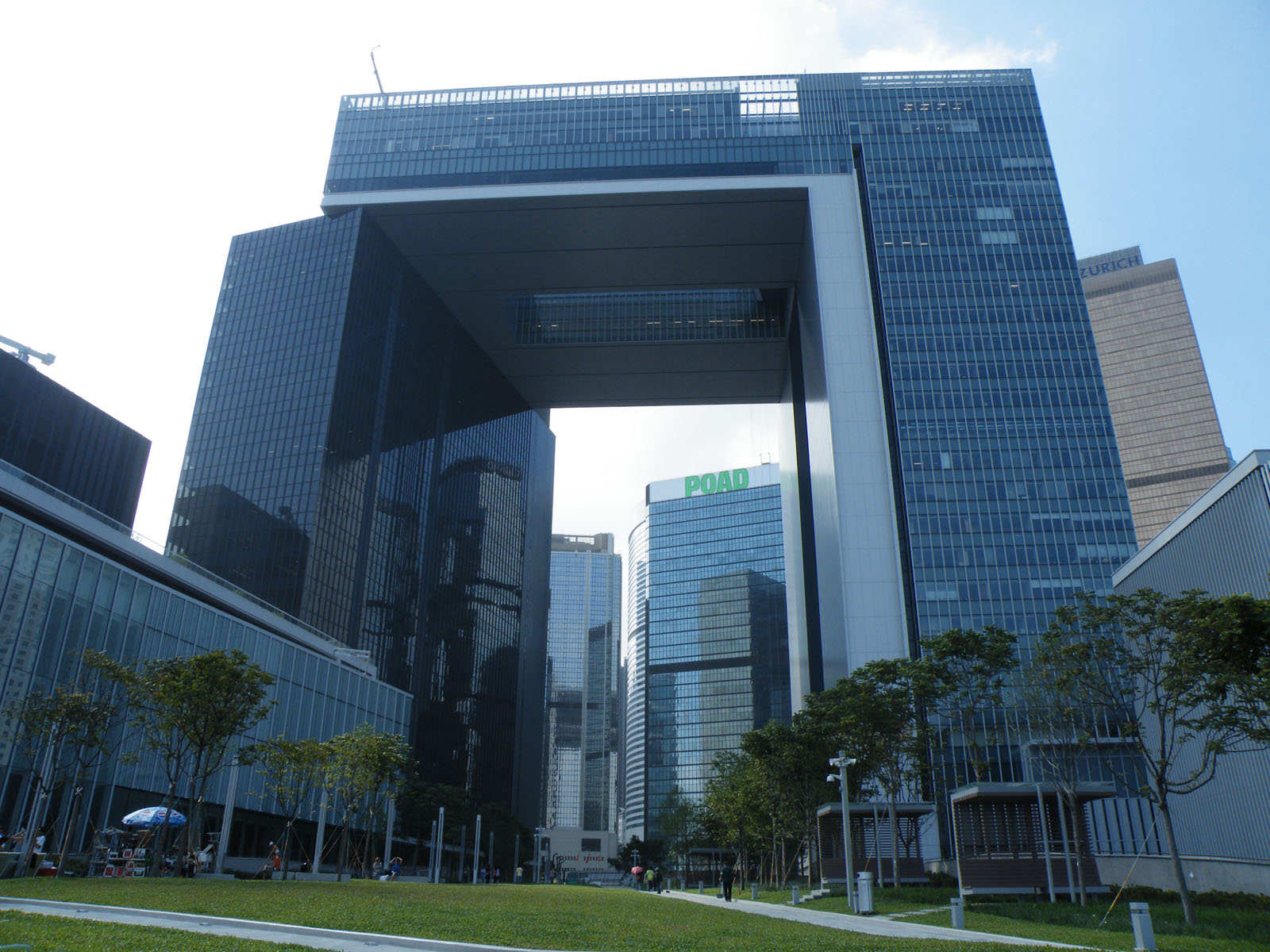
East and West Wing Building of the Central Government Offices

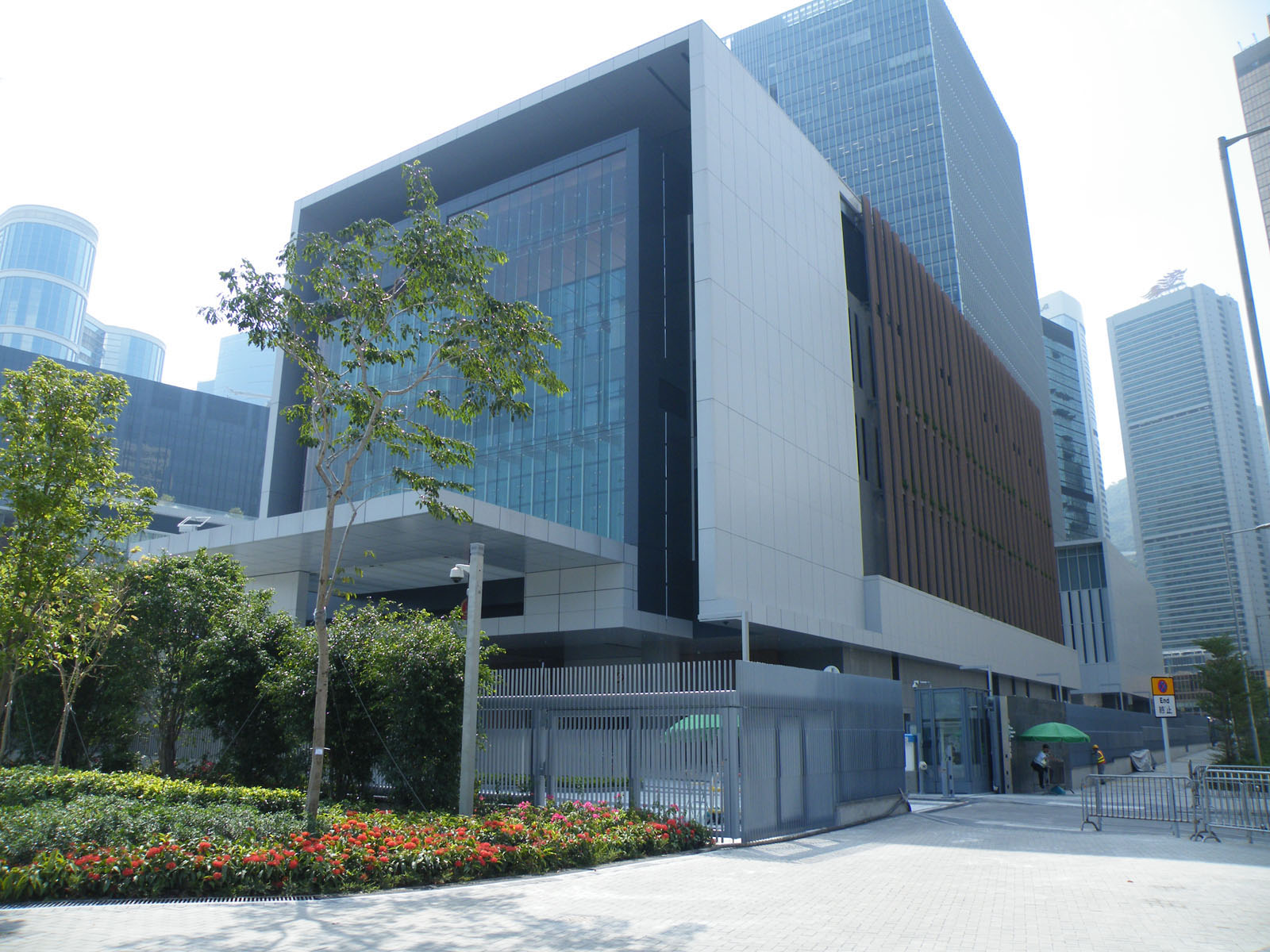
Building for the Office of the Chief Executive

The East and West wings of the Central Government Offices of Hong Kong Government are located to the southeast and southwest of the Tamar Park. The office of the chief executive is located northwest of the park, and the Legislative Council Complex is located on the northeast of the park. From the park visitors can see the Victoria Harbour and skyline of Tsim Sha Tsui area.
