= Central Government Complex (Hong Kong) =

Hong Kong government headquarters

Coordinates: 22°16′51″N 114°9′56″E

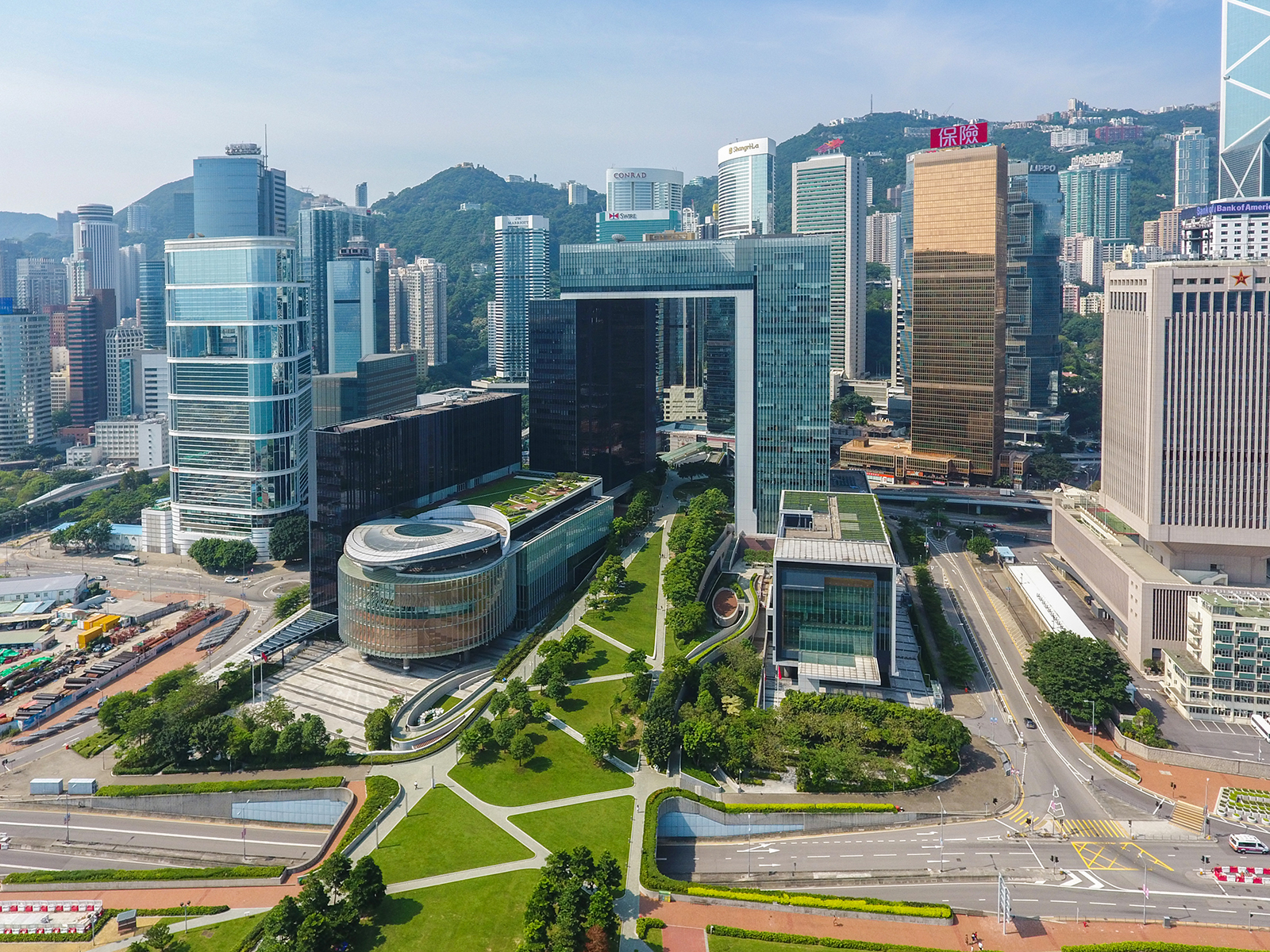
- View of Office Block of the Central Government Complex in May 2017
- Traditional Chinese: 香港特別行政區政府總部
- Simplified Chinese: 香港特别行政区政府总部
Transcriptions
Standard Mandarin
- Hanyu Pinyin: Xiānggǎng Tèbié Xíngzhèngqū Zhèngfǔ Zǒngbù
Yue: Cantonese
- Yale Romanization: Hēung góng dahk biht hàhng jing kēui jing fú júng bouh
- Jyutping: Hoeng1 gong2 dak6 bit6 hang4 zing3 keoi1 zing3 fu2 zung2 bou6

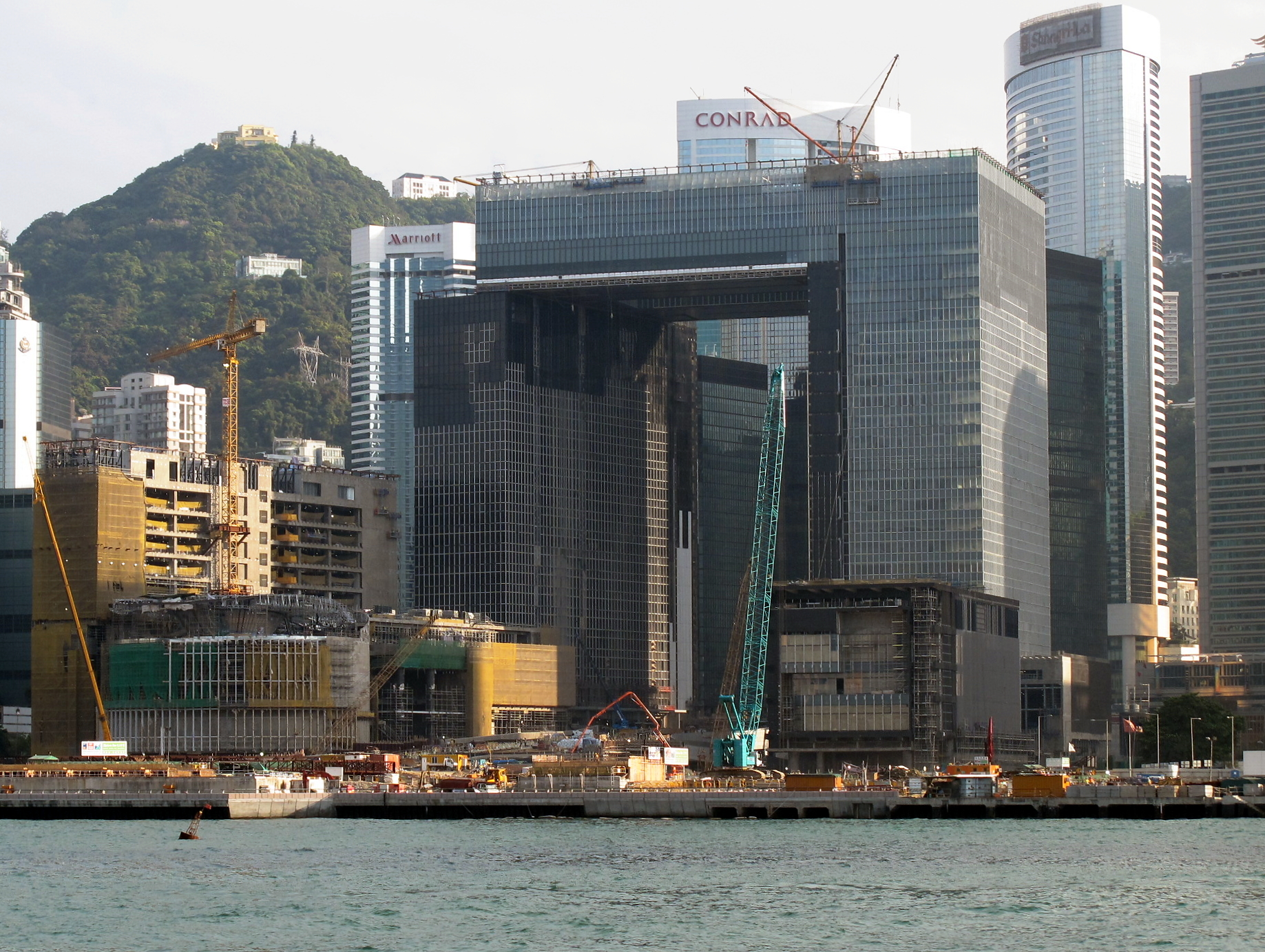
Central Government Complex Site in March 2011

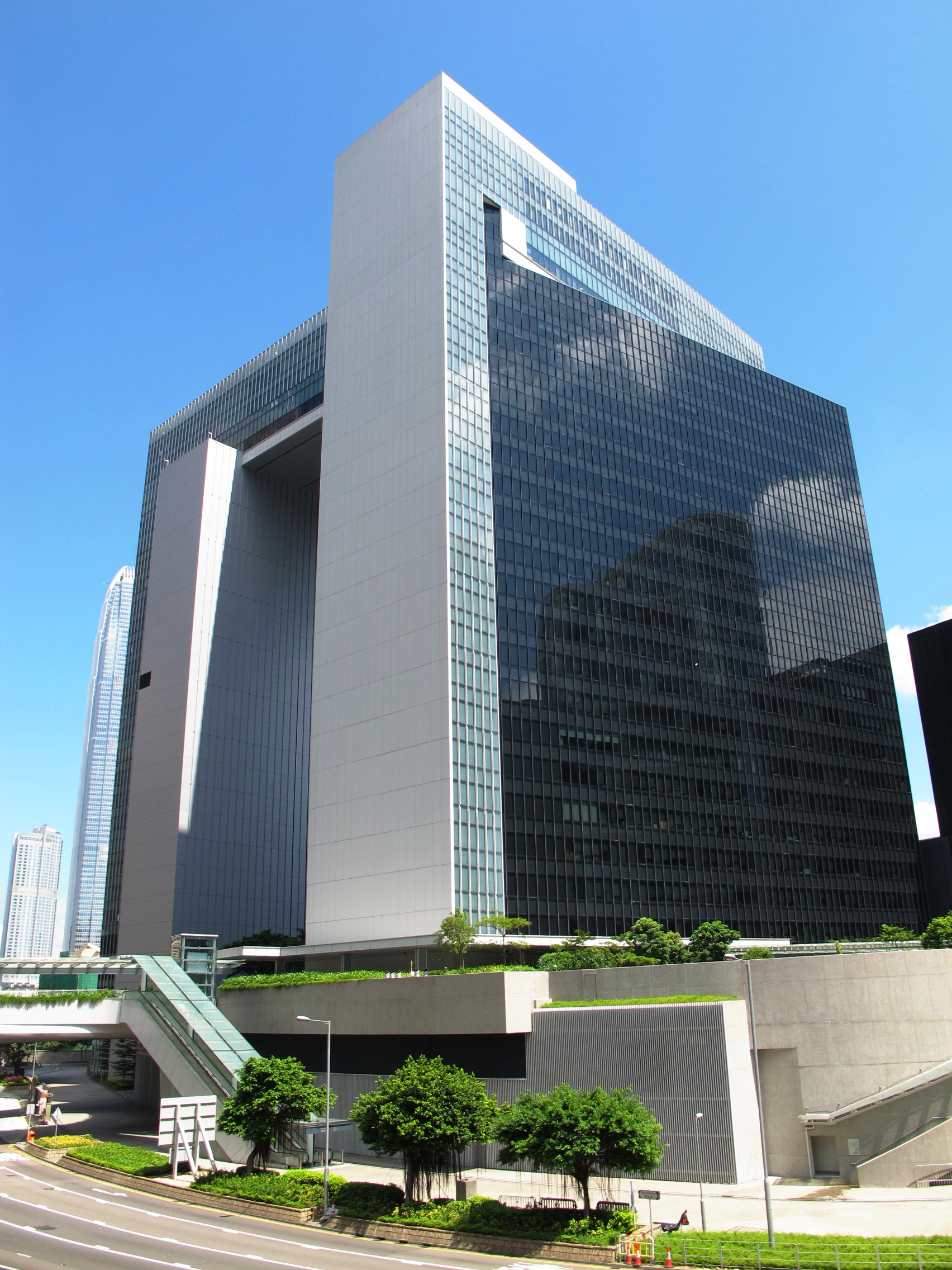
Central Government Complex View from Harcourt Road in August 2013

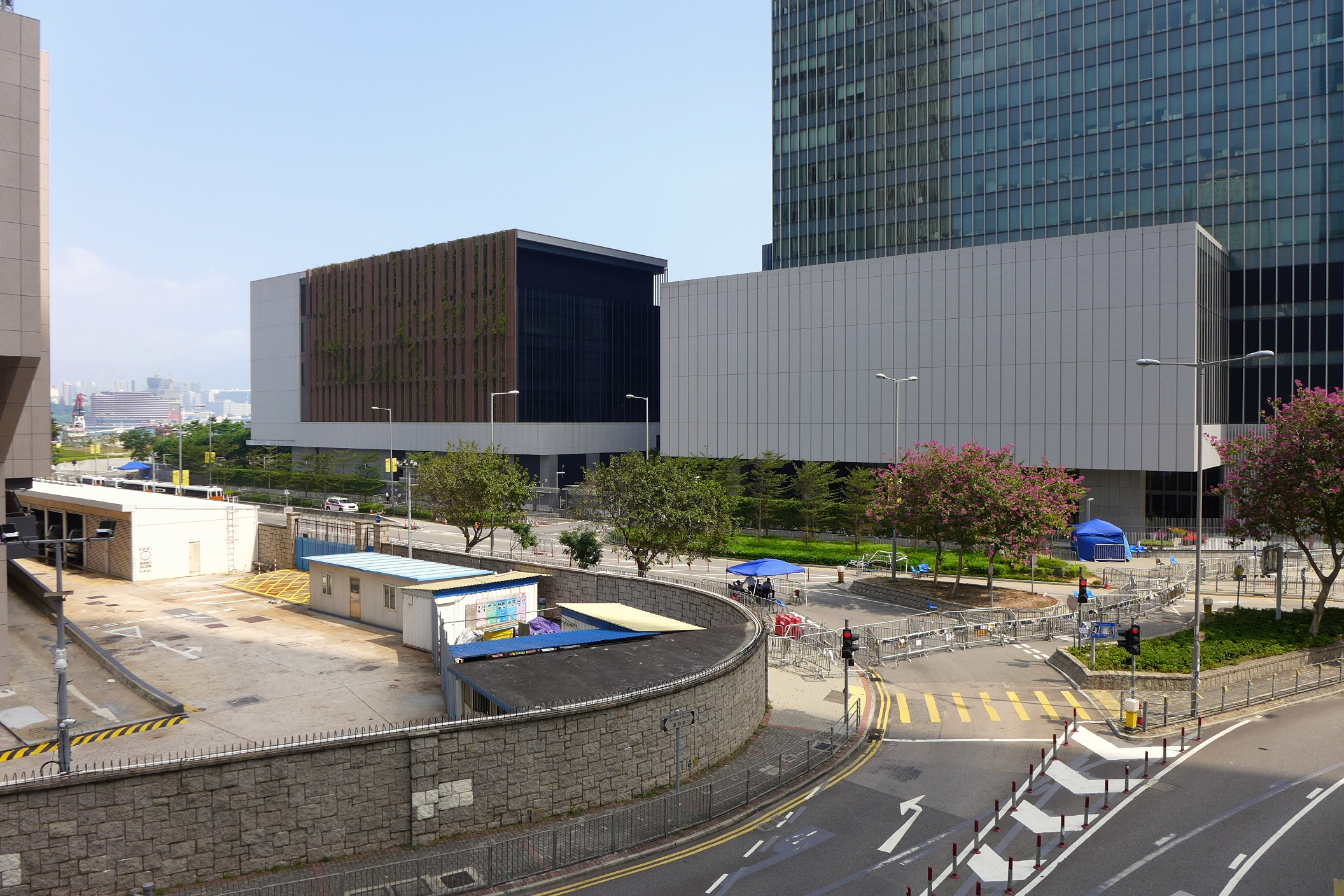
Rear view of the Low Block of the Central Government Complex West Wing in November 2014

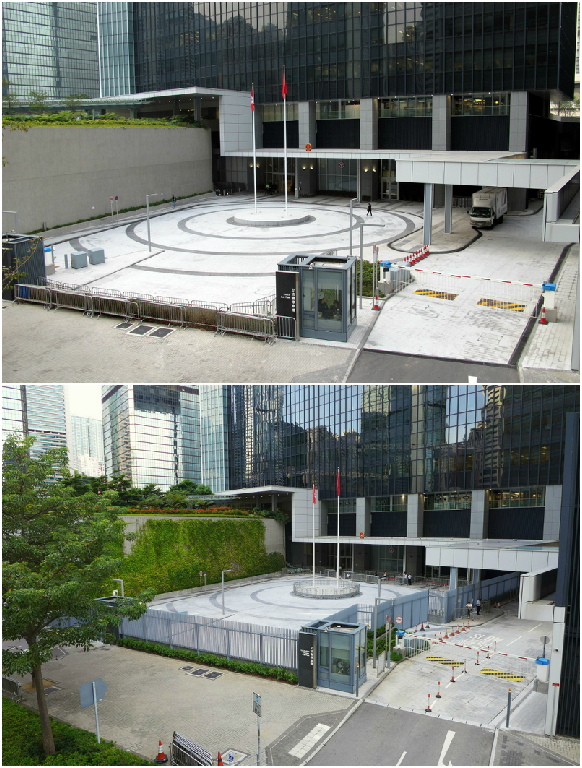
The Civic Square, before and after its fortification

The Central Government Complex has been the headquarters of the Government of Hong Kong since 2011. Located at the Tamar site, the complex comprises the Central Government Offices, the Legislative Council Complex and the Office of the Chief Executive of Hong Kong. The complex has taken over the roles of several buildings, including the former Central Government Offices (CGO), Murray Building and the former Legislative Council Building.

== History ==
By 2001, existing government offices at Murray Building and the former Central Government Offices were considered to be too small. Maintenance of the buildings was also increasingly costly, and the age of the buildings limited the technology used in them. The Legislative Council Building on Jackson Road was also too small to house the entire LegCo Secretariat and all members' offices.

A new government complex at Tamar was approved by the Executive Council on 30 April 2002 under the Tung Chee-hwa administration. The new complex was to be the headquarters of the government, the Legislative Council and other community facilities, including a gallery, leisure facilities, open spaces and a waterfront promenade. At the time, the construction was estimated to cost HK$6.4 billion.

The building was delivered through a design-build contract won by the Gammon-Hip Hing joint venture. Construction was due to begin in mid-February 2008, for completion in 2011. It engaged more than 3,000 workers.

== Architecture ==
The architect was Rocco Yim, who premised the massing on the concept of "door always open". The new government building uses neither Chinese nor European government building designs, but instead it is a mix of postmodern architecture and low-frills international design. The building initially had an open design, but has been heavily fortified after various protests.

== Public realm ==
The complex was originally designed by Yim under the concept of "Door Always Open", symbolising the pride that Hong Kong holds in its "openness and transparency of governance". In keeping with this theme, the complex was meant to be accessible to the public and integrated with the surrounding urban context, and incorporates a range of public spaces. Tamar Park passes through the complex, leading to the waterfront promenade on Victoria Harbour.

The Civic Square in front of the complex's East Wing has been blocked off from public access with a permanent fence.

== Components ==
The complex consists of three blocks:

=== Office Block ===
Floor	West Wing	East Wing
26/F	Chief Executive's Policy Unit	
25/F	Office of the Chief Secretary for Administration, Office of the Financial Secretary	
24/F	Financial Services and the Treasury Bureau	
23/F	Commerce and Economic Development Bureau	
22/F	Commerce and Economic Development Bureau	Transport and Housing Bureau
21/F	Innovation and Technology Bureau, Innovation and Technology Commission	Transport and Housing Bureau
20/F	Innovation and Technology Bureau, Innovation and Technology Commission	Transport and Housing Bureau
19/F	Commerce and Economic Development Bureau, Development Bureau	Food and Health Bureau
18/F	Development Bureau	Food and Health Bureau
17/F	Development Bureau	Food and Health Bureau, Development Bureau, Transport and Housing Bureau
16/F	Development Bureau	Environment Bureau, Environmental Protection Department
15/F	Development Bureau	Environment Bureau, Environmental Protection Department
14/F	Government Headquarters Data Centre	
13/F	Home and Youth Affairs Bureau	Constitutional and Mainland Affairs Bureau
12/F	Home and Youth Affairs Bureau	Constitutional and Mainland Affairs Bureau
11/F	Home and Youth Affairs Bureau, Labour and Welfare Bureau	Education Bureau
10/F	Labour and Welfare Bureau	Security Bureau
9/F	Civil Service Bureau	Security Bureau
8/F	Civil Service Bureau	Security Bureau
7/F	Civil Service Bureau	Education Bureau
6/F	Civil Service Bureau	Education Bureau
5/F	Civil Service Bureau	Education Bureau
4/F		Education Bureau
3/F		Civil Service Bureau, Administration Wing

While official use came into effect on 1 August 2011, administrative staff had moved in beginning 15 January 2011.
