= Reactions to the 2014 Hong Kong protests =

Domestic & international responses

The 2014 Hong Kong protests opposed the 2014–15 Hong Kong electoral reform enacted by the Standing Committee of the National People's Congress of China.

Pro-democracy groups argued that the police used excessive force, while Pro-Beijing advocates disputed this claim. Some who supported Beijing argued that the protesters violated the rule of law.

Several nations and international bodies, including the United Nations Human Rights Commission, supported the protesters, and the Western media took an interest in the protests. However, Russia spoke out against the protests.

== Domestic reactions ==
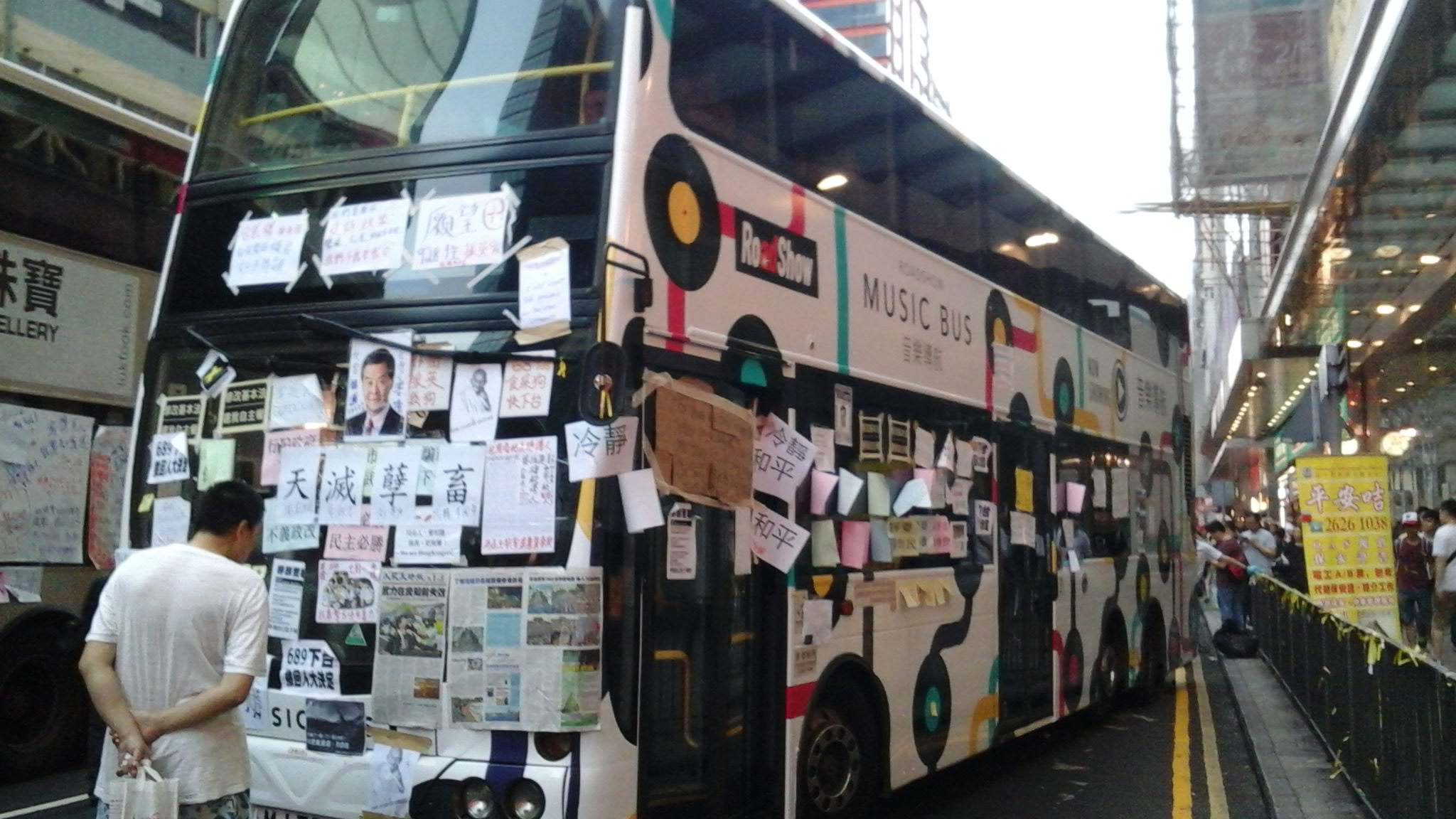
A double-decker bus in Mong Kok is used as a message board

=== Pro-democracy ===
- Director of Hong Kong Human Rights Monitor Law Yuk-kai was dissatisfied with the unnecessary violence meted out by the police. He said students had broken into the Civic Square to sit-in peacefully with no intention of destroying government premises. He questioned the mobilisation of riot police while protesters were not involved in conflict. Also, the police's overuse of batons was underestimated because the weapon could harm protesters.
- Former Chief Secretary Anson Chan expressed disappointment at the United Kingdom's silence on the matter and urged it to assert its legal and moral responsibility towards Hong Kong, and not only think about trade opportunities. Chan dismissed China's accusation of foreign interference, saying: "Nobody from outside could possibly stir up this sort of depth of anger and frustration".
- Member of Legislative Council Albert Ho of the Democratic Party said, "[Attack on protesters] was one of the tactics used by the communists in mainland China from time to time. They use triads or pro-government mobs to try to attack you so the government will not have to assume responsibility."

=== Pro-Beijing ===
- Legislative Council Chairman Jasper Tsang Yok-sing disagreed that the police were excessively violent, saying they would not misuse pepper spray. Contrary to the claims of other pro-establishment members, Tsang said he sees little evidence of "foreign forces" at play.
- Former Chief Executive Tung Chee-hwa, when asking the students to leave the protest, said "You have made a great sacrifice by putting aside everything to join the movement in the pursuit of democracy. But the rule of law and obeying the law form the cornerstone of democracy."
- Former Legco president Rita Fan said "to support the movement, some protesters background have resources that are supported by foreign forces using young people for a cause. To pursue democracy that effects other people's livelihood is a form of democratic dictatorship."
- On 29 October, Laura Cha, chairwoman of the Financial Services Development Council and a member of Hong Kong's Executive Council, the Chinese parliament and the board of HSBC, said, "African-American slaves were liberated in 1861, but did not get voting rights until 107 years later. So why can't Hong Kong wait for a while?" An online petition called for her to apologise and withdraw her remarks. A spokesman for the Executive Council stated in an e-mail on 31 October that "She did not mean any disrespect and regrets that her comment has caused concerns".

=== Business sector ===
The Federation of Hong Kong Industries, whose 3,000 manufacturer-members were largely unaffected because manufacturing in Hong Kong has largely moved to the mainland, opposed the protests because of concerns about their effects on investors' confidence. While the business groups have expressed concern over the disruption caused to their members, the city's wealthiest people have remained fairly quiet because they faced the dilemma of losing the patronage of CPC leadership while trying to avoid further escalation by refraining from overt condemnations of the movement. On the 19th day of the protests, Li Ka-Shing recognised that students' voices had been heard by Beijing and urged them to go home "to avoid any regret". Li was criticised by Xinhua for being ambiguous in his opposition for the movement and his support for Leung. Lui Che Woo, the second-richest man in Asia, appeared to hold a pro-Beijing stance by saying, "citizens should be thankful to the police". Lui was opposed to "any activity that has a negative impact on the Hong Kong economy".

== International reactions ==
=== Organisations ===
On 23 October, the United Nations Human Rights Committee (UNHCR), which monitors compliance with the International Covenant on Civil and Political Rights, urged China to allow free elections in Hong Kong. The committee said universal suffrage includes the right to stand for office as well as the right to vote. Describing China's actions as "not satisfactory", the committee's chairman Konstantine Vardzelashvili said, "The main concerns of Committee members were focused on the right to stand for elections without unreasonable restrictions".

The following day, a spokesman for China's Foreign Ministry confirmed that the Covenant, signed by China in 1998, did apply to Hong Kong; he said, "The covenant is not a measure for Hong Kong's political reform", and that China's policy on Hong Kong's elections had "unshakable legal status and effect". Reuters said, "It was not immediately clear how, if the covenant applied to Hong Kong, it could have no bearing on its political reform".

- European Union – a spokeswoman for the diplomatic service expressed the EU's concern and urged restraint on all sides.
- World Uyghur Congress – President Rebiya Kadeer said the protests in Hong Kong "are very inspiring" to Xinjiang's independence movement, and "if Hong Kong wins, it will benefit Uighurs as well".

=== States ===
Leaders of countries, including Australia, Canada, France, Germany, Italy, Japan, Taiwan, Vatican City, United Kingdom and the United States, supported the protesters' right to protest and their cause of universal suffrage, and urged restraint on all sides. Russia, whose state media said the protests were another West-sponsored colour revolution similar to the Euromaidan.

==== United Kingdom ====
UK Prime Minister David Cameron expressed deep concern about clashes in Hong Kong and said he felt an obligation to the former territory. Cameron said on 15 October Britain should stand up for the rights set out in the Anglo-Chinese agreement. The Foreign Office called on Hong Kong to uphold residents' rights to demonstrate, and said the best way to guarantee these rights is through transition to universal suffrage. Former Hong Kong Governor and current Chancellor of the University of Oxford Chris Patten expressed support for the protests and denounced the Iranian-style democratic model of the city. Citing China's obligation to Britain to adhere to the terms of Sino-British Joint Declaration, he urged the British government to put greater pressure on the Chinese state and to help China and Hong Kong find a solution to the impasse. The Chinese Foreign Ministry said Patten should realise "times have changed", and that no party had the right to interfere in China's domestic affairs.

==== Taiwan ====
In Taiwan, the situation in Hong Kong is closely monitored because China aims to reunify the island with a "one country, two systems" model similar to the one used in Hong Kong. President Ma Ying-jeou expressed concern for the developments in Hong Kong and its future, and said the realisation of universal suffrage will be a win-win scenario for both Hong Kong and mainland China. On 10 October, Taiwan's National Day, President Ma urged China to introduce constitutional democracy, saying "now that the 1.3 billion people on the mainland have become moderately wealthy, they will of course wish to enjoy greater democracy and rule of law. Such a desire has never been a monopoly of the west, but is the right of all humankind." In response to Ma's comments, China's Taiwan Affairs Office said Beijing was "firmly opposed to remarks on China's political system and Hong Kong's political reforms ... Taiwan should refrain from commenting on the issue".

==== Other states ====
A number of countries, including the US, UK, Australia, Singapore, Malaysia issued travel advisories for their nationals to avoid the protest areas. In view of the large number Philippine nationals in Hong Kong, the Philippine government advised nationals to "avoid being inadvertently perceived as being part of the protest actions".

Canada – The Canadian Ministry of Foreign Affairs said Canada is "supportive of democratic development in Hong Kong and believe that the ongoing adherence to the 'One country, two systems' policy has contributed to and remains essential for Hong Kong's stability and prosperity". The ministry also said Canada "reiterates its support for the implementation of universal suffrage for the election of the Chief Executive in 2017 and all members of the Legislative Council in 2020, in accordance with the Basic Law and the democratic aspirations of the Hong Kong people",

France – The French Foreign Ministry stated it was "closely following" street demonstrations in Hong Kong and stressed the protesters' right to march peacefully. Foreign Ministry spokesman Romain Nadal told a news conference, "We are closely following the evolution of the situation and we reiterate our attachment to the right to demonstrate peacefully".

Germany – Chancellor Angela Merkel said freedom of speech should remain guaranteed by law in Hong Kong. At a function to celebrate the 24th anniversary of German reunification attended by the Hong Kong Chief Secretary, Germany's Consul-General to Hong Kong, Nikolaus Graf Lambsdorff, said, " ... especially in the light of our own recent German history, I believe that Hong Kong can be proud of its youth. I am sure that the efforts to make Hong Kong more democratic will be good for Hong Kong politically, but also economically". At a reunification party in Leipzig, German president Joachim Gauck compared the spirit of Hong Kong's pro-democracy protesters to their own of 24 years ago. He said the protesters "overcame their fear of their oppressors because their longing for freedom was greater". The statement was made one day before Gauck met the Chinese Premier Li Keqiang.

Italy – The Italian Foreign Ministry declared its hope that "the local and Chinese authorities, in the face of the peaceful demands of many young people and citizens, show wisdom and listening skills." The Ministry also advocated "a common solution which also responds to the legitimate aspirations of those who ask for the respect of the Constitution adopted in 1997".

Japan – Japanese Chief Cabinet Secretary Hiroshige Seko said, "A democratic Hong Kong that is prosperous and stable will play an extremely important role for countries in the Asia-Pacific region, including Japan. Our hope is that Hong Kong will be able to maintain its free and open system under (the principle of) 'one country, two systems".

Russia – Russian state media said the protests were another West-sponsored colour revolution similar to the Euromaidan.

United States – Following a visit by Chinese Foreign Minister Wang Yi, a White House statement said, "the United States has consistently supported the open system that is essential to Hong Kong's stability and prosperity, universal suffrage, and the aspirations of the Hong Kong people". US President Barack Obama told Wang Yi the United States was watching the protests in Hong Kong closely and urged a peaceful solution to the issue.

Vietnam – The Foreign Ministry's spokesperson Le Hai Binh said the protests were "internal affairs for China".

=== Foreign media ===
The incident captured the attention of American and European media after a clearance and arrests outside the Central Government Complex. Student leader Joshua Wong featured on the cover of Time magazine during the week of his 18th birthday, and the movement was featured in a cover story the following week. While the local pan-democrats and the majority of the Western press supported the protesters' aspirations for universal suffrage, Martin Jacques, writing for The Guardian, said China had "overwhelmingly honoured its commitment to the principle of one country, two systems". He also said the reason for the unrest is "the growing sense of dislocation among a section of Hong Kong's population" since 1997. Tim Summers, in an op-ed for CNN, said the protests were fuelled by dissatisfaction with the Hong Kong government, but the catalyst was the 2014 NPCSC decision. Criticising politicians' and the media's interpretation of the agreements and undertakings of China, Summer said, "all the Joint Declaration said is that the chief executive will be 'appointed by the central people's government on the basis of the results of elections or consultations to be held locally [in Hong Kong]'. Britain's role as co-signatory of that agreement gives it no legal basis for complaint on this particular point, and the lack of democracy for the executive branch before 1997 leaves it little moral high ground either."

After 33 days of occupation, The Straits Times said the two sides in the impasse seemed to be entrenched and hawks were gaining an advantage as moderates left. Benny Tai and Chan Kin-man left because of exhaustion from trying to exert a moderating influence on the more radical members of HKFS and on hardline groups. Third parties who acted as mediators had long been sidelined. Civic Party legislator Ronny Tong said, "Any suggestion that they leave [is] not a matter of rational discussion any more".

In 2015 Oscars Awards, rapper Lonnie Lynn (aka Common) encouraged the people of Hong Kong to continue to fight for democracy when he was giving the winning speech for his 1st Oscars winning on Best Original Song.

== See also ==
- Umbrella Square
- Umbrella Ultra Marathon
