= Umbrella Ultra Marathon =

- Date: 29 October 2014
- Location: New Territories: Sham Tseng, Tai Lam, Shek Kong, Tai Po, Ma On Shan, Sai Kung, Sha Tin. Kowloon: Mong Kok, Tsim Sha Tsui. Hong Kong: Admiralty, Pok Fu Lam.
- Caused by: To support the Umbrella Movement of Hong Kong after a full-month duration.

The Umbrella Ultra Marathon, or Umbrellaultra, was a 102 km distance running event held on 29 October 2014. It was not a competitive race, but a running event to support the Umbrella Movement of Hong Kong. The course covered New Territories, Kowloon and Hong Kong Island, which shows an umbrella shape on the map. Thus the trail is also known as the Umbrella Trail.

== Names ==
The name of the "Umbrella Ultra Marathon" came from its aim at supporting the occupation protests by the umbrella movement, which also called the "Umbrella Revolution" in reference to the umbrellas used by protesters to defence against police's pepper spray and tear gas. Some runners implemented this idea through a distance running passed through the main areas occupied by the pro-democracy protesters. Another reason of the name was: The course covered New Territories, Kowloon, and Hong Kong Island, which shown an umbrella shape on the map of Hong Kong.

== Background ==
The Umbrella Movement started on 28 September 2014, when initiators of the Occupy Central movement announced the commencement at a rally taking place the Central Government Complex on Tim Mei Avenue. Police blocked all entrance to Tim Mei Avenue to obstruct Occupy Central supporters, and arrested demonstrators inside the Central Government Complex by 1:30 pm. A crowd gathered and anti-surrounded the police outside Tim Mei Avenue to stop police's transference of the arrested demonstrators. Police used pepper spray and tear gas to disperse the crowd- the first time that police in Hong Kong fired tear gas since 2005, while the crowd use umbrellas to fight against pepper spray and tear gas. The umbrella becomes symbol of this movement, and thus called the Umbrella Revolution or the Umbrella Movement.

On 29 October, the full-month of the Umbrella Movement, some distance runners conceived the idea to support the Movement and to show solidarity with protesters by running a course which shown an umbrella shape on the map of Hong Kong. Another reason to choose running to show their support was: "running is synonymous with freedom", added Olya Korzh, an ultramarathon champion.

== Organising history ==
The event was organised by John Ellis, Andrew Dawson, Richard Scotford, and Andre Blumberg. Ellis and Dawson conceived the idea on Sunday, 26 October with the aim of showing support for the students and the Umbrella Movement. They expected only a few friends would run the event. The event was publicised on Facebook, and the media picked up the announcement on the Tuesday evening.

== Event ==
The Umbrella Ultra Marathon started at Shing Mun Reservoir at 4:00 on 29 October 2014. Three participants took part at the start, while some spontaneous supporters joined later at different check points: Tai Lam, Shek Kong, Tai Po, Ma On Shan, Sai Kung, Sha Tin, Mong Kok, and Admiralty. Many supporters joined at Mong Kok and Admiralty during the evening. It was estimated that 150 runners were involved in the event. The total distance was 114.9 km, with elapsed time 16:49:09. The running team took a little rest in three "occupy areas" in Mong Kok, Admiralty, and finally Causeway Bay to show support to the protesters.
