= Konstantine Vardzelashvili =

Georgian jurist

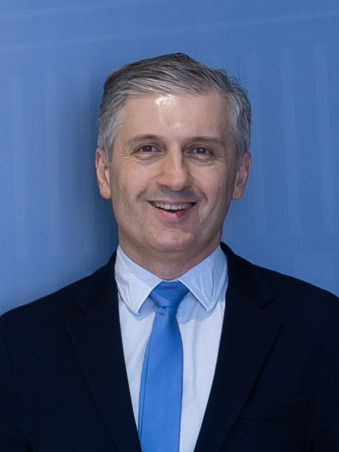
2025 Image of Konstantine Vardzelashvili

Konstantine Vardzelashvili (Georgian: კონსტანტინე ვარძელაშვილი; born 26 July 1972 in Tbilisi) is vice-president of the Constitutional Court of Georgia. He was elected to the court in 2006 and directly became a vice-president.
