= Conservatism in Hong Kong =

Conservatism in Hong Kong has become the underlying ideology of the pro-Beijing camp, which has been the major supporting force of the SAR administration led by the Chief Executive. It is one of two major political ideologies of Hong Kong, with the other being liberalism. Since the Sino-British Joint Declaration of 1984, conservatism has been characterised by business elites joining with pro-Communist traditional leftists in a united front to resist the rise of the demand for democratisation and liberalisation, in order to secure continued political stability and economic prosperity while maintaining a good relationship with the communist central government in Beijing leading up to and after the 1997 handover.

Historically, conservatism derives from the Chinese tradition of familism and Confucianism. These traditions were incorporated into the British colonial government's policies by Governor Cecil Clementi in the 1920s during the rise Marxism–Leninism and communism more broadly. Anti-communist sentiment continued after the Second World War when waves of Chinese refugees fled to the colony as the Chinese Communist Party (CCP) grew in mainland China in the renewed Chinese Civil War. At this time, conservatives supported the Republic of China (ROC), and were pro–Kuomintang (KMT). After the de facto end of the civil war and throughout the Cold War, Conservatives have also taken libertarian thoughts on economic policies. Before the 1980s, most conservatives held a strong anti-communist sentiment.

== Early colonial period ==
=== Laissez-faireism ===
As a British free port, the local elite of Chinese compradors leveraged Hong Kong's status as a gateway to the vast Chinese market. Hong Kong merchants took the leading role in investment and trading opportunities by serving as middlemen between Europeans and the indigenous population of China and Hong Kong. This relationship follows the principles of laissez-faire classical liberalism, which has since dominated the discourse of the economic philosophy of Hong Kong.

Hong Kong was previously rated the world's freest economy, a title bestowed on it by The Heritage Foundation, a conservative Washington think tank, and was greatly admired by libertarian economist Milton Friedman.

=== Traditional conservatism ===
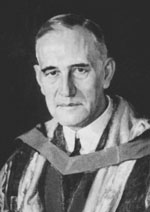
Cecil Clementi, Governor of Hong Kong who instilled traditional conservatism in Hong Kong education.

Hong Kong as a predominantly Chinese society has its own cultural conservatism based on Confucian teachings. The conservatism of the Chinese elites was protected under the British colonial rule in the early collaborative colonial regime between the Chinese elites and British colonialists. To facilitate its governance, the colonial government helped consolidate the gentry's power to preserve conservative cultural values in the wake of the progressivism of Chinese nationalism such as the 1919 May Fourth Movement and the subsequent New Culture Movement in the 1920s.

As Marxist and anti-imperialist movements grew stronger in China in the 1920s, Hong Kong Chinese elites sought refuge in traditional Chinese values and the British colonial government came to the defence of Chinese traditionalism. During the Canton–Hong Kong strike in 1925–26 directed by the Kuomintang government in Canton, Chinese elites, including Legislative Council unofficial members R. H. Kotewall and Shouson Chow, actively advised and helped coordinate counterstrike efforts. Kotewall also addressed Hong Kong Governor Cecil Clementi about the European inspectorate of the vernacular schools and emphasised the need for the colonial government to carefully monitor vernacular education, as the schools had become "breeding grounds for sedition". Clementi directly intervened in the Chinese-language curriculum, stressing Chinese traditional teachings and endorsing "the ethics of Confucianism which is, in China, probably the best antidote to the pernicious doctrines of Bolshevism, and is certainly the most powerful course..." In 1927, the University of Hong Kong established a Chinese department which helped form the Chinese curriculum to be used in Hong Kong schools. The conservative Chinese curriculum was reaffirmed in the 1950s when the colonial government appropriated Chinese traditionalism to counter Communist influences.

== Post-war period ==
=== Utilitarian familism ===
Post-war Hong Kong saw an influx of refugees fleeing from the Chinese Communist Revolution. The resulting abundance of cheap labour contributed to Hong Kong's graduation to an advanced, high-income economy sustaining growth rates (in excess of 7 percent a year). Hong Kong industrialised rapidly from the mid-1950s to the 1990s when Hong Kong was dubbed one of the "Four Asian Tigers". To explain the "economic miracle", sociologist Lau Siu-kai deployed the concept of "utilitarian familism", which summarises the general attitudinal orientations that were manifest in the post-war Chinese immigrants whose materialism made them the ideal economic beings. For them, the utilitarian impulse was preceded by their attachment to traditional Chinese familistic values. The pre-conditional "minimally-integrated socio-political system" in the post-war colony where the polity and the society are seen as mutually secluded and the Hong Kong people were allegedly more interested in family than in politics, turning always to their familial relatives for help, instead of making demands on the government.

=== Positive non-interventionism ===
Fiscal conservatism is thought to have contributed to Hong Kong's 20th century economic success. In 1971, Financial Secretary John Cowperthwaite coined the term "positive non-interventionism", espousing low levels of government intervention and taxation, while at the same time providing regulatory and physical infrastructure designed to facilitate market-based decision making. The policy was continued by subsequent Financial Secretaries, including Sir Philip Haddon-Cave, who said that "positive non-interventionism involves taking the view that it is normally futile and damaging to the growth rate of an economy, particularly an open economy, for the Government to attempt to plan the allocation of resources available to the private sector and to frustrate the operation of market forces," although he stated that the description of Hong Kong as a laissez-faire society was "frequent but inadequate".

Milton Friedman wrote in 1990 that the Hong Kong economy was perhaps the best example of a free market economy. Shortly before his death in 2006, The Wall Street Journal published his "Hong Kong Wrong – What would Cowperthwaite say?" which criticised then Chief Executive Donald Tsang for having abandoned "positive non-interventionism" by defining "small government" as less than 20 per cent of GDP.

Fiscal conservatism has remained the dominant economic philosophy in Hong Kong throughout its history, enjoying different labels including "consensus capitalism" (Financial Secretary Hamish Macleod, 1991–95), "minimum intervention, maximum support" (Donald Tsang) and "proactive market enabler" (Antony Leung, early 2000s). The basic principle of fiscal conservatism was followed by Financial Secretary John Tsang from 2007 to 2017.

=== Anti-communism ===
The mainland refugees in Hong Kong also consisted a sizeable number of the right-wing Nationalist (Kuomintang) soldiers and supporters, in which most of them held a strong anti-communist sentiment. In the 1950s and 60s, the Hong Kong society was divided into the pro-Communist left-wing and pro-Nationalist right-wing rivalry. In 1956, the Hong Kong local Kuomintang supporters attacked the Communists in Hong Kong which became the Hong Kong 1956 riots. 59 people were killed and 740 had been arrested, mainly for rioting and looting.

Conservative rural leaders, business elites, film production companies including the Shaw Brothers and Cathay Studios and the media, including Chinese newspapers Sing Tao Daily, Wah Kiu Yat Po and Kung Sheung Daily News and English newspaper South China Morning Post, also largely supported the British colonial government or the Kuomintang government in Taiwan until the 1980s. They joined hand in condemning the Hong Kong 1967 Leftist riots instigated by the pro-Communist elements in the colony. The New Asia College which was established in 1949 by a group of anti-communist mainland scholars including Ch'ien Mu and Tang Chun-i also attempted the promote the Confucian teachings and Chinese traditional values. The New Asia College was later incorporated into the Chinese University of Hong Kong in 1963.

The Nationalist–Communist rivalry was also part of the broader picture of the Cold War. Besides funding the conservative Chinese cultural institutions such as the New Asia College and the Yale-China Association, the United States also encouraged and took advantage of the anti-Communist activities of the Kuomintang. During the 1950s, the Third Force was created by the Central Intelligence Agency as an anti-communist movement of Chinese, which posed a problem for the British authorities, who although ideologically aligned with the United States to keep Hong Kong non-Communist, had officially recognised the Chinese Communist regime in 1950 and were highly sensitive about provoking Beijing.

== Run up to 1997 ==
=== The 1980s: Rise of conservative bloc ===
As the Sino-British negotiation for the Hong Kong sovereignty after 1997 began in the early 1980s, the business elites sought the way to maintain the status quo of Hong Kong. They initially supported the British Conservative Prime Minister Margaret Thatcher's efforts in insisting the validity of the Treaty of Nanking of 1842. However, Deng Xiaoping, the Chinese paramount leader insisted in restoring sovereignty in Hong Kong in 1997, but guaranteed the "capitalist system and way of life shall remain unchanged for 50 years," which was later written in the Article 5 of the Hong Kong Basic Law.

Besides its "Old Left" Beijing loyalists in the colony which were represented by the Hong Kong Federation of Trade Unions (HKFTU), the Communist authorities in Beijing also actively ally with the business elites, professionals and rural leaders, who were used to be seen as pro-Nationalists, as part of their "United Front" strategy. Many tycoons and professionals were appointed to various bodies such as the Hong Kong Basic Law Drafting Committee (BLDC) and Basic Law Consultative Committee (BLCC) to draft the future mini-constitution of Hong Kong. In the wake of the rise of the liberal lobby which demanded a faster democratisation, the conservative bloc formed the Business and Professional Group of the Basic Law Consultative Committee and the Group of 89 led by tycoon Vincent Lo in 1986 to counter the liberal movement.

The business elites were concerned about the potential tax increases which might have been introduced by a democratic legislature to fund an expansion of the social budget, fiscal conservatism became an integral feature of the Basic Law, which writes the SAR "shall follow the principle of keeping the expenditure within the limits of revenues in drawing up its budget, and strive to achieve a fiscal balance, avoid deficits and keep the budget commensurate with the growth rate of its gross domestic product" as written in Article 107, reflecting Beijing's and business bloc's interest in having a politically and economically conservative Hong Kong.

The business and professional bloc favoured close limited on the franchise, the retention of an elite system of the government, the avoidance of party politics, and the maintenance of an independent judiciary. The group proposed a conservative constitution of electing the Chief Executive and Legislative Council after 1997, a legislature with no more than 25 per cent elected seats and chief executive elected by a 600-member electoral college, in contrary to the more progressive proposal of the pro-democratic members of the Consultative Committee. After the Tiananmen Square crackdown in 1989, the Group of 89 softened its stance slightly with respect to direct elections and reopened negotiations with the pro-democracy camp which led to the outcome of the "compromise model". However the compromise model divided the group between the one who favoured compromise and the ones who favoured the pro-Beijing model put forward by the New Hong Kong Alliance (NHKA).

=== The 1990s ===
==== Resistance to the liberal surge ====
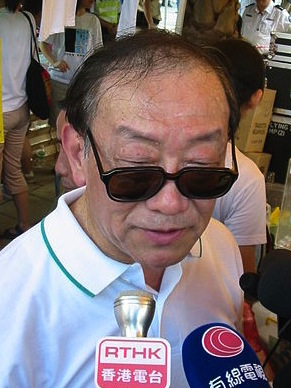
Allen Lee, founding chairman of the Liberal Party.

In the light of the first ever Legislative Council direct election, the conservatives in the BLDC and BLCC formed several organisations. The Business and Professionals Federation of Hong Kong (BPF) headed by Vincent Lo was formed in 1990. The Liberal Democratic Federation of Hong Kong (LDF) led by Hu Fa-kuang and Maria Tam was formed in November 1990 with the support of the grassroots organisations Progressive Hong Kong Society (PHKS) and the Hong Kong Civic Association (HKCA). The LDF actively participated in the 1991 three-tier elections but was defeated in the liberal landslide led by the United Democrats of Hong Kong (UDHK) and Meeting Point (MP) alliance. The New Hong Kong Alliance led by Lo Tak-shing was formed in 1989 by the conservative wing of the BLDC and BLCC group.

To curb the rise of the liberal force in the legislature, 21 appointed and indirectly elected Legislative Council members from the functional constituencies founded the Co-operative Resources Centre (CRC) led by Senior Unofficial Member of the Executive and Legislative Councils Allen Lee, which transformed into the Liberal Party in 1993. About the same time, the traditional leftists, which were now considered to be conservative, also formed in the Democratic Alliance for the Betterment and Progress of Hong Kong (DAB) led by Tsang Yok-sing in 1992. The business elites, professionals, and rural leaders also further grouped themselves in the Hong Kong Progressive Alliance (HKPA) headed by Ambrose Lau in 1994 under the direction of the New China News Agency (NCNA).

The conservatives strongly opposed the constitutional reform package by last Governor Chris Patten which would faster the pace of democratisation. The Liberal Party lobbied against the bill as orchestrated by Beijing behind the scene, which saw the Patten bill as the "triple violations" of the Sino-British Joint Declaration, the Hong Kong Basic Law and the Sino-British agreements. The bill was at last narrowly passed with the help of the pro-democracy camp. In response to the 1995 fully elected legislature, the Beijing government set up the Provisional Legislative Council (PLC) with conservative majority.

==== Consensus capitalism and caring capitalism ====
Hamish Macleod, Financial Secretary of Hong Kong between 1991 and 95, coined the term "consensus capitalism", suggesting that the community had reached a consensus on the merits of Hong Kong's brand of capitalism, which was to "encourage free enterprise and competition, while promoting equity and assistance for those who need it......because the community righty expects a fair deal for everyone, and in particular that raw competition be tempered by help for those less able to compete." To Macleod, capitalism "provides the greater likelihood of maximising economic performance and defending political liberty while securing something approaching equality of opportunity."

Donald Tsang, Macleod's successor as Financial Secretary also coined the term "caring capitalism" in 1996, which describe the governments's approach of giving priority to economic growth and then using the new-found wealth to develop social infrastructure and welfare services.

== Early handover period ==
=== Tung administration ===
Since the handover of Hong Kong, the conservatives have been dominated the executive and legislature with the help of the Election Committee and the trade-based functional constituencies with limited electorates respectively. The pro-business economic liberal Liberal Party and the Chinese nationalist Democratic Alliance for the Betterment of Hong Kong (DAB) were the two major parties vis-a-vis the pro-democratic Democratic Party in the Legislative Council in the first decades after the handover. The Liberals and the DAB were invited to the government coalition by the first Chief Executive Tung Chee-hwa as he appointed the two party chairmen, Liberal's James Tien and DAB's Tsang Yok-sing into the Executive Council in 2002 under the new Principal Officials Accountability System. The Tung administration was characterised by Confucian paternalist values and conservative governance, as well as the civil service which was conservative in its outlook.

The 1997 Asian financial crisis forced the SAR government to take a more active role in the economic policies. In 2002, Financial Secretary Antony Leung redefined the overall policy as "big market, small government" and that the government should be a "proactive market enabler" who took "appropriate measures to secure projects beneficial to economy as a whole when the private sector is not ready." In 2004, Financial Secretary Henry Tang coined another new term of "market leads, government facilitates."

The continuing economic recession, the SARS epidemic and the controversial Basic Law Article 23 national security legislation drew the largest anti-government protest on 1 July 2003. James Tien subsequently resigned from the Executive Council in opposition to the legislation which forced the government to shelve the bill. In the following November District Council election, the DAB suffered a great defeat which led to the resignation of Tsang Yok-sing as the party chairman. On the other hand, Liberals received a great victory by winning two geographical constituencies directly elected seats in the 2004 Legislative Council election.

=== Tsang administration ===
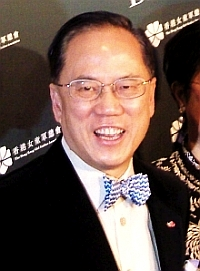
Donald Tsang, Financial Secretary (1995–2001) and Chief Executive (2005–12).

In March 2005, Tung resigned as Chief Executive for health reasons, and was succeeded by Chief Secretary for Administration Donald Tsang who was a civil servant for nearly forty years. By co-opting supporters and some pro-democracy elites into the Strategic Development Commission, Tsang portrayed himself as the master of social and political harmony. In December, the Tsang administration's constitutional reform blueprint proposed the Election Committee selecting the Chief Executive be widened from 800 to 1,600 members in 2007 and empowered directly elected and appointed District Council members to elect six of the expanded 70-member Legislative Council in 2008. The bill was ultimately defeated by the pan-democracy camp as they argued the Tsang's reform blueprint was too conservative while the conservatives accused the liberals of being obstinate.

In 2006, Tsang proclaimed that "positive non-interventionism" was "past tense" for Hong Kong, which the role of the government was to "facilitate what the market does." Tsang's statement drew criticism locally and internationally, notably from economic philosopher Nobel Laureates Milton Friedman who had highly praised Hong Kong's free market economy, Edmund Phelps and an economist from the Chinese Academy of Social Sciences. Friedman published the article "Hong Kong wrong" on The Wall Street Journal in October 2006 shortly before he died, criticising Tsang for abandoning positive non-interventionism. The Heritage Foundation, a conservative Washington think tank, formally removed Hong Kong's designation as a bastion of economic freedom. Tsang later vowed his government's commitment to "small government".

In the 2007 Chief Executive election, Tsang faced challenged from a liberal candidate, Civic Party legislator Alan Leong. With the conservative dominance of the Election Committee, Tsang defeated Leong 649 to 123 votes. In the constitutional reform package in 2010, the Tsang government reached a breakthrough with the pro-democratic Democratic Party after the Democrats reached an agreement with the Beijing representatives to pass the modified reform package.

=== Leung administration ===
More than one conservative candidates ran in the 2012 Chief Executive election. Chief Secretary Henry Tang who was supported by the major business elites and Liberal Party and Convenor of the Executive Council Leung Chun-ying who was seen as the underdog and ran a more pro-grassroots agenda contested against each other. Although Leung eventually became the favourite of Beijing and won the election with the support of the Central Government Liaison Office, the election divided the conservative bloc into a Tang camp and a Leung camp. After the election, Beijing called for a reconciliation of the two camps.

Leung Chun-ying administration was unable to unite the conservative bloc. The Liberal Party, which suffered a great split after the 2008 Legislative Council electoral defeat has openly criticised Leung. Liberal leader James Tien was ejected from the Chinese People's Political Consultative Conference (CPPCC) after he called on Chief Executive CY Leung to resign during the 2014 Hong Kong protests. Economic Synergy, the breakaway group from the Liberals, formed the Business and Professionals Alliance for Hong Kong (BPA) with the Professional Forum legislators in 2012, while Regina Ip, former Secretary for Security who was in charge of the Article 23 legislation in 2003 formed in the New People's Party (NPP) in 2011. Together with DAB and FTU, the BPA and NPP formed a loose pro-government coalition.

In 2014, the conservative constitutional reform proposals and National People's Congress Standing Committee's (NPCSC) restriction on the nomination process of the Chief Executive also triggered the 79-day occupy movement, as proposed by the pro-democracy group Occupy Central with Love and Peace. To counter the occupy movement, the conservative activists led by former radio host Robert Chow also formed the Alliance for Peace and Democracy to launch signature campaigns to oppose the occupy movement. By the time, many pro-government activist groups began to emerge such as Voice of Loving Hong Kong, Caring Hong Kong Power and Hong Kong Youth Care Association, often with ultra-patriotic and militant rhetorics.

=== Lam administration ===
After Leung surprisingly declared he would not seek for re-election, Chief Secretary Carrie Lam and Financial Secretary John Tsang became the main candidates in the 2017 Chief Executive election. Tsang who was seen as ultraconservative on his fiscal policy was challenged by Lam's call for a "new fiscal philosophy" to adopt more proactive approach in investing for Hong Kong and relieving people's burdens with the record-breaking fiscal surplus. However, Lam was seen more politically conservative and was labelled as "CY 2.0" who would follow Leung's hardline and divisive policies, as compared to Tsang who called for reconciliation with the opposition camp. The pro-democrats supported Tsang as they saw Tsang as the "lesser evil" of the two. As a result, Lam won in the election with the alleged support of the Liaison Office.

== Xi Jinping era ==
Since the ascendance of Xi Jinping to the General Secretary of the Chinese Communist Party in 2012 and re-elected to the party leader in 2017, Hong Kong was increasingly facing Beijing's grip on its high autonomy. In 2014 in the midst of the constitutional reform debate and the Occupy Central movement, the Information Office of the State Council published a white paper titled The Practice of the 'One Country, Two Systems' Policy in the Hong Kong Special Administrative Region, written by Chinese conservative legal theorist Jiang Shigong formerly working at the Beijing's Liaison Office in Hong Kong, raised concerns among the Hong Kong public. The paper asserts its "comprehensive jurisdiction" over the territory. "The high degree of autonomy of the HKSAR [Hong Kong Special Administrative Region] is not full autonomy, nor a decentralised power," it says. "It is the power to run local affairs as authorised by the central leadership." It also stresses that "loving the country is the basic principle for Hong Kong's administrators," who also have a responsibility to safeguard "the country's sovereignty, security and development interests and [to ensure] the long-term prosperity and stability of Hong Kong." It also asserts the necessity "to stay alert to the attempt of outside forces to use Hong Kong to interfere China's domestic affairs, and prevent and repel the attempt made by a very small number of people who act in collusion with outside forces to interfere with the implementation of 'one country, two systems' in Hong Kong."

In the following years, the kidnappings of the Causeway Bay Books staffs who published books critical of Xi Jinping and the Communist Party and the abduction of a Hong Kong-residing Chinese billionaire Xiao Jianhua raised alarm of the increasingly blur border between Hong Kong and mainland China. In 2019, Chief Executive Carrie Lam push for the extradition bill which would establish a mechanism for transfers of fugitives between Hong Kong and mainland China, which raised concerns among various sectors of Hong Kong which feared it would further erosion of Hong Kong's separate legal system and its built-in safeguards for civil liberties, as well as damage to Hong Kong's business climate. The opposition to the bill turned into an unprecedented city-wide protests throughout the latter half of 2019, which fizzled out due to the COVID-19 pandemic in early 2020.

In June 2020, the National People's Congress Standing Committee (NPCSC) installed the national security law on Hong Kong unilaterally which criminalised "separatism, subversion, terrorism and foreign interference", which many interpreted as a crackdown on civil liberties, government critics, and the independence movement. Under the law, a National Security Division of the Hong Kong Police Force would be given an enormous power and Office for Safeguarding National Security would be exempt from Hong Kong jurisdiction. The law also allow some cases to be transferred to the Chinese courts. Various national governments expressed concern that the Chinese plans would undermine Hong Kong autonomy and the "One Country, Two Systems" policy and cancelled their extradition treaties with Hong Kong. In response, United States President Donald Trump declared that the administrative principle of "One country, Two systems" was no longer in effect, and terminated Hong Kong's special trade status with the United States under Executive Order 13936. Numerous Hong Kong and Mainland officials including Chief Executive Carrie Lam were sanctioned by the United States for "undermining the autonomy of Hong Kong." U.S. conservative think tank The Heritage Foundation also dropped Hong Kong from its annual "Index of Economic Freedom" in which Hong Kong had topped the list for a quarter century in 2021, explaining that it "measures economic freedom only in independent countries where governments exercise sovereign control of economic policies."

Western observers attributed the shift of Beijing's policies toward Hong Kong to a new group of Chinese "statist" legal scholars who subscribed to an expansive view of state authority to ensure "stability overrides all else" which was inspired by conservative Nazi German legal theorist Carl Schmitt who served as Adolf Hitler's "crown jurist". Chen Duanhong, a law professor at Peking University, directly cited Schmitt in defense of the national security law in 2018, arguing that the state had the right to suspend constitutional norms, especially provisions for civil rights, "when the state is in dire peril." has made a similar case. Jiang Shigong also employed Schmitt's ideas extensively in his 2010 book China's Hong Kong to resolve tensions between sovereignty and the rule of law in favour of the Chinese Communist Party and provided rationale for the autocratisation in Hong Kong.

== Conservative localism ==
A strain of conservatism was found in the emerging localist movement in the early 2010s aiming at preserving the distinct cultural identity from Beijing's growing encroachment of Hong Kong people's way of life and civil liberties. In 2011, Chin Wan, an assistant professor in the Lingnan University's Chinese department published the book, On the Hong Kong City-State in 2011 which triggered fierce public debate and was popular among the young generation. In the book, Chin pointed out the potential threat of the influx of mainland tourists and immigrants to the established institutions and social customs of Hong Kong, which he considered likely part of a colonisation scheme by Beijing, including the increasing use of Mandarin Chinese and Simplified Chinese in daily use and in schools. As a cultural traditionalist, Chin cited British colonial governor Cecil Clementi's fostering of local traditional culture in the 1920s, arguing that, thanks to British colonialism, "Hong Kong's culture today is both more modern and more authentically Chinese — or more rooted in ancient traditions — than the culture of mainland China," where orthodox religious customs and traditional written Chinese were abandoned under the Communist regime.

Chin saw Hong Kong as the true claimant of the traditional Chinese culture and saw the Hong Kong–mainland Chinese cultural distinction as the Confucian notion of Hua–Yi distinction (civilised–uncivilised dichotomy). At the time, such tendency of culturalist localism often mixed with anti-mainland and anti-immigrant sentiments and was condemned as "xenophobic" and "nativist" by pro-Beijing activists and the government. He founded the Hong Kong Resurgence Order with a manifesto aiming to "restore the ancient Chinese civilisation". Some localist groups such as the Hong Kong Indigenous took up some of Chin's conversationist ideas for their movement of defending Hong Kong's cultural identity against the influx of Mainland parallel traders which largely disrupted the local neighbourhoods in Hong Kong, as well as Beijing's increasing encroachment on Hong Kong's autonomy and their ways of life. They even launched several "liberate campaigns" against the Mainland elements in the communities. Some other small political groups including the Conservative Party which favoured the return of Hong Kong to become a British Overseas Territory were also set up.

== List of conservative parties ==
=== New Hong Kong Alliance ===
- 1989: Formation of the New Hong Kong Alliance
- 1999: The party was dissolved

=== Liberal Democratic Federation of Hong Kong ===
- 1990: Formation of the Liberal Democratic Federation of Hong Kong
- 1993: Members of the group joined the ⇒ Liberal Party
- 1997: The party merged into the ⇒ Hong Kong Progressive Alliance

=== Democratic Alliance for the Betterment and Progress of Hong Kong ===
- 1990: Formation of the Democratic Alliance for the Betterment of Hong Kong
- 2005: The Hong Kong Progressive Alliance merged into the ⇒ Democratic Alliance for the Betterment and Progress of Hong Kong

=== Breakfast Group to Professional Forum ===
- 1991: Formation of the Breakfast Group
- 2004: The group regroup into ⇒ the Alliance
- 2008: The group regroup into ⇒ Professional Forum
- 2012: The group merged into ⇒ Business and Professionals Alliance for Hong Kong

=== Liberal Party ===
- 1993: Formation of the Liberal Party
- 2008: Some members left and formed the ⇒ Economic Synergy

=== Hong Kong Progressive Alliance ===
- 1994: Formation of the Hong Kong Progressive Alliance
- 1997: The Liberal Democratic Federation of Hong Kong merged into the ⇒ Hong Kong Progressive Alliance
- 2005: The party merged into the ⇒ Democratic Alliance for the Betterment and Progress of Hong Kong

=== Economic Synergy ===
- 2009: Formation of the Economic Synergy
- 2012: The group merged into ⇒ Business and Professionals Alliance for Hong Kong

=== New People's Party ===
- 2011: Formation of the New People's Party
- 2014: Civil Force entered alliance with the ⇒ New People's Party
- 2017: Michael Tien left the party and formed ⇒ Roundtable

=== Business and Professionals Alliance for Hong Kong ===
- 2012: Formation of the Business and Professionals Alliance for Hong Kong

== Conservative figures and organisations ==
Politicians and office holders

- David Akers-Jones (colonial era)
- Selina Chow
- Chung Sze-yuen
- Cecil Clementi (colonial era)
- John Cowperthwaite (colonial era)
- Rita Fan
- Henry Fok
- Alexander Grantham (colonial era)
- Philip Haddon-Cave (colonial era)
- Junius Ho
- Stanley Ho
- Hu Fa-kuang
- Regina Ip
- Carrie Lam
- Jeffrey Lam
- Ambrose Lau
- Lau Nai-keung
- Lau Wong-fat
- Allen Lee
- John Lee
- Starry Lee
- Andrew Leung
- Antony Leung
- Leung Chun-ying
- Lo Tak-shing
- Vincent Lo
- Hamish Macleod (colonial era)
- Shiu Sin-por
- Maria Tam
- Tam Yiu-chung
- Chris Tang
- Henry Tang
- James Tien
- David Trench (colonial era)
- Donald Tsang
- Tsang Hin-chi
- John Tsang
- Tsang Yok-sing
- Tung Chee-hwa
- David Wilson (colonial era)
- Gordon Wu

Intellectuals, writers and activists

- Louis Cha (colonial era, shifted to centrist camp)
- Ch'ien Mu
- Chin Wan
- Robert Chow
- Lau Siu-kai
- Tang Chun-i

Think-tanks

- Business and Professionals Federation of Hong Kong
- Hong Kong Research Association
- The Lion Rock Institute
- One Country Two Systems Research Institute
- Savantas Policy Institute

Magazines and media

- ATV
- Hong Kong Economic Times
- Oriental Daily
- Phoenix Television
- South China Morning Post
- Sing Tao Daily
- Ta Kung Pao
- The Sun
- TVB
- Wen Wei Po

Media personalities, radio hosts, and bloggers

- Jackie Chan
- Jordan Chan
- Charles Heung
- Clifton Ko
- Dante Lam
- Andrew Lau
- Run Run Shaw
- Eric Tsang
- Chip Tsao
- Liza Wang
- Wong Jing
- Raymond Wong Pak-ming
- Donnie Yen

Organisations

- Alliance for Peace and Democracy
- Caring Hong Kong Power
- Chinese General Chamber of Commerce
- Chinese Manufacturers' Association of Hong Kong
- Employers' Federation of Hong Kong
- Federation of Hong Kong Industries
- Heung Yee Kuk
- Hong Kong Chinese Enterprises Association
- Hong Kong Chinese Importers' and Exporters' Association
- Hong Kong General Chamber of Commerce
- Hong Kong Youth Care Association
- Real Estate Developers Association of Hong Kong
- Silent Majority for Hong Kong
- Voice of Loving Hong Kong

Jurists

- Andrew Chan
- Henry Litton
- Wally Yeung

== See also ==
- Asian values
- Economy of Hong Kong
- Four big families of Hong Kong
- Pro-ROC camp (historical)
- Ultraconservatism § Hong Kong
- United front in Hong Kong

=== Other ideologies in Hong Kong ===
- Anarchism in Hong Kong
- Centrism in Hong Kong
- Liberalism in Hong Kong
- Localism in Hong Kong
- Socialism in Hong Kong
