= Dot Dot News =

Hong Kong online media outlet

Dot Dot News 點新聞
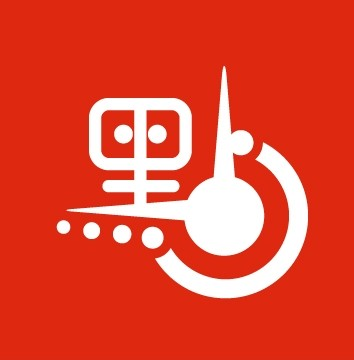
- Available in: Chinese, English
- Headquarters: Southern District, Hong Kong
- Owners: Ta Kung Wen Wei Media Group (Ta Kung Pao and Wen Wei Po)
- Website: dotdotnews.com
- Launched: 17 August 2016; 10 years ago

Dot Dot News (Chinese: 點新聞) is a pro-Beijing online media outlet established in Hong Kong in 2016 and owned by the state-owned Ta Kung Wen Wei Media Group. It maintains close ties and shares office with the pro-Beijing newspaper Wen Wei Po.

== 2019 Facebook restrictions ==
During the 2019–2020 Hong Kong protests, following the death of a protester who fell from the Pacific Place shopping mall on 15 June 2019 after standing on the fourth-floor platform for five hours, Dot Dot News published an article the next day, alleging that LegCo politician Roy Kwong phoned the victim and encouraged him to commit suicide at the scene. Kwong denounced the article as fake news, saying that the practice of fabricating charges against a victim was despicable. Kwong also rebuked the accusations, stating that police prevented him, a registered social worker, from counselling the man to encourage him to return to a safer spot. In early September 2019, Facebook introduced the fact check mechanism in Hong Kong, in the hope of suppressing fake news via collaboration with Agence France-Presse and gatekeeping of senior reporters. They would validate the trustfulness of the news and information shared via Facebook. On 11 September, Facebook restricted Dot Dot News's account; after launching an appeal, Facebook restored the page, but banned it again on 13 September. Dot Dot News launched a new page on 14 September, claiming censorship by Facebook.

On 20 September, they opened another Facebook page named "點新聞dotdotnewsmedia", and claimed they would fight against unreasonable suppression. Wen Wei Po criticized Facebook for suppressing the press freedom and cut the Hong Kong citizens from getting rational and patriotic messages. Dot Dot News' case was reported on by media outlets locally and across the globe including South China Morning Post and CNN as well as Pro-Beijing media outlets Global Times, HKGPao and Silent Majority.
