= Policy Innovation and Co-ordination Office =

Hong Kong government office

- 政策創新與統籌辦事處

Agency overview
- Formed: 1 April 2018; 8 years ago
- Preceding agency: Central Policy Unit
- Dissolved: 1 July 2022
- Jurisdiction: Government of Hong Kong
- Headquarters: 26/F, West Wing, Central Government Offices, 2 Tim Mei Avenue, Tamar, Hong Kong
- Agency executive: Doris HO Pui Ling, Head
- Website: https://www.pico.gov.hk/

Policy Innovation and Co-ordination Office
- Traditional Chinese: 政策創新與統籌辦事處
- Simplified Chinese: 政策创新与统筹办事处
Transcriptions
Standard Mandarin
- Hanyu Pinyin: Zhèngcè Chuàngxīn yǔ Tǒngchóu Bànshìchù
Yue: Cantonese
- Jyutping: jing3 chaak3 chong3 san1 yu5 tung2 chau4 baan6 si6 chyu3

The Policy Innovation and Co-ordination Office (PICO) was a creation in Carrie Lam's Policy Address in 2017 to revamp the Central Policy Unit. It has commenced operation since 1 April 2018, and ceased operation from 1 July 2022.

The Policy Innovation and Co-ordination Office is a policy and innovation unit advising the Chief Executive of Hong Kong and coordinates with other areas of the Government of Hong Kong (namely bureaux and departments) to enhance public participation in policy creation.

== Functions ==
The Council of Advisers on Innovation and Strategic Development was established in 2018 to replace the two former advisory bodies (Commission on Strategic Development and the Economic Development Commission). In light of the establishment of the new advisory council, PICO would provide the council with secretariat services and research support to facilitate objective and systemic discussions based on evidence.

PICO manages the current two policy research funding schemes in Hong Kong, namely the Strategic Public Policy Research Funding Scheme and the Public Policy Research Funding Scheme.

The "first-stop" and "one-stop" consultation services have been provided by the small dedicated offices in the Development Bureau and later the Chief Secretary for Administration's Office from 2009 to 2017.

Increasing the participation of young people in policy making has been an important reason why PICO was established. Carrie Lam, when she was still the Chief Executive-elect in 2017, had talked about her intention to reorganise the Central Policy Unit to a new organisation to employ 20-30 young people on a non-civil servant contractual basis to nurture them as young and energetic policy designers for around three years. This vision has laid down the framework for the later establishment of the PICO. Before the establishment of PICO, Carrie Lam has also suggested that when the contract concludes, these young people could either return to their original work and training, or they would have nurtured sufficient interest in politics that they could, for instance, participate in District Council elections.

Further, since PICO would formulate different policy research and co-ordination work, PICO would also make different arrangements for engaging the different stakeholders concerned and the general public. For instance, the PICO could arrange engagements of different forms, such as small group meetings with experts, focus groups, workshops and public meetings.

=== Reorganisation of government structure for sixth term government ===
The PICO is also responsible for drafting the proposal for the reorganisation of government for the 6th-term government. On 17 May, the Executive Council endorsed the proposal for reorganisation. After the government published the package of proposals to reorganise the government structure, neither PICO nor the former CPU was seen in the reorganisation structure. It is uncertain whether the PICO's functions would change in the new government, as well as whether PICO would remain in the new government. Yet, as the Chief Executive-Elect John Lee suggested, policy research and innovation are essential to the government, and if the PICO will no longer exist in the new government, another revamp will be made through the establishment of another new organ in the government structure.

== Organisation ==
The structure of the Office is as follows,

- Head (Non-Civil Service Appointment (D8-equivalent)/ Administrative Officer Staff Grade A1 (D8)
  - Deputy Head (1) (Administrative Officer Staff Grade B1 (D4)
    - Administration and General Team
    - Assistant Head (1); Assistant Head (2) (Administrative Officer Staff Grade C (D2)
      - Secretariat to CE's Council of Advisers
      - Policy Research and Co-ordination Team
- Deputy Head (2) (Administrative Officer Staff Grade B (D3)
  - Assistant Head (3) (Administrative Officer Staff Grade C (D2)
    - Project Co-ordination Team
    - Policy Research and Co-ordination Team
- Deputy Head (3) (Administrative Officer Staff Grade B (D3)
  - Assistant Head (4) (Administrative Officer Staff Grade C (D2)
    - Statistics Team
    - Policy Research and Co-ordination Team
  - Public Policy Research Funding Team

The head of the Office is responsible to the Chief Executive.

The Chief Executive's Council of Advisers on Innovation and Strategic Development was formed alongside the Office in 2018. It replaced two former advisory bodies – the Commission on Strategic Development and the Economic Development Commission, both of which also used to be chaired by the Chief Executive. One of the functions of the Office is to provide secretariat and research support to the Chief Executive's Council of Advisers on Innovation and Strategic Development.

== Development ==
The Office was seen as a replacement for the Central Policy Unit (CPU). CPU was formally established in 1989 to supplement the then Government Secretariat's work by researching and examining specific policy issues.

On 27 February 2017, the then-CE candidate Carrie Lam suggested in her Election Manifesto to transform the Central Policy Unit into a policy and project coordination unit that looks after cross-bureau and cross-department projects and fosters public participation in policy formulation and policy research and innovation. It was also suggested that the new unit would no longer be involved in the appointment of members of statutory bodies and Government committees.

In October 2017, Chief Executive Carrie Lam announced in her Policy Address that the Policy Innovation and Coordination Office would be established to revamp the CPU. Young people who aspire to be engaged in policy research and policy and project coordination would be recruited to join the Office as non-civil service contract staff. In her Policy Address, Lam also announced the establishment of the Chief Executive's Council of Advisers on Innovation and Strategic Development, which would replace the Economic Development Commission and Commission on Strategic Development. The Policy Innovation and Coordination Office would provide secretarial support for the council and conduct evidence-based policy research in light of the council's suggestions.

On 23 February 2018, the Finance Committee of the Legislative Council approved the funding, i.e. the addition of four permanent posts in the civil service, for the establishment of the Office.

On 1 April 2018, the Policy Innovation and Coordination Office was officially established.

=== Dissolution and uncertainties ===
In January 2022, Chief Executive Carrie Lam announced her proposed government restructuring plan during her attendance at the Chief Executive's Q&A session at the Legislative Council. In the documents submitted to the Legislative Council, the Policy Innovation and Coordination Office was not listed in the organisational chart of the proposed restructured government. This aroused speculation from the public that the Policy Innovation and Coordination Office would be disbanded in the coming government administration. According to some government insiders, since the Policy Innovation and Coordination Office reported directly to the Chief Executive, the Lam administration would not put forward any proposals regarding the Office at that moment and its future would be decided by the next Chief Executive, such that if he sees fit, he may rename it as the "Development and Policy Reform Group". Starry Lee, the chairperson of DAB, which is the largest political party in Hong Kong, likewise pushed for the establishment of a "Development and Policy Reform Group". She was of the view that the formation of such a Unit would enable long-term planning and tighten cooperation with its Mainland counterpart, viz, the "National Development and Reform Commission".

After announcing his intention to run for the Chief Executive election, John Lee Ka-chiu suggested that he would deliberate with the incumbent administration over the prospect of the Policy Innovation and Coordination Office. On 17 May 2022, upon John Lee's successful election, the Executive Council endorsed Chief Executive-elect John Lee's proposal to reorganise government structure for his coming administration. The proposal affirmed most of the recommendations put forward in Carrie Lam's policy address. However, both the Policy Innovation and Coordination Office and the Central Policy Unit which was speculated to be re-established, were not mentioned in the restructuring proposal. It has thus been observed that regardless of the format of the new policy research department, the Policy Innovation and Coordination Office would cease to exist.

Lee said that he was inclined to develop a working group for conducting policy research, and would actively study the specific format for establishing such a "policy research group" after forming his "cabinet", which was still in progress. During a press release, Lee put emphasis on "strengthening" policy research and pledged to take into account different perspectives and views outside the government to facilitate a better understanding of different views in the society. He added that the proposed policy research group would also study issues relating to international affairs.

On 1 July 2022, the website of PICO stated that the Office has ceased operation from 1 July 2022.

== Comparison Between CPU and PICO ==
=== Differences in target audience ===
CPU was an "internal think tank" for the top echelon of the government, namely, the Chief Executive, the Chief Secretary for Administration and the Financial Secretary. The CPU rarely provided research services for other policy bureaus. In fact, the heads of the policy bureau did not have access to the reports produced by CPU. Thus, the CPU was described as one of the most opaque bodies in the government. There had been proposals requesting the government to increase the transparency of CPU.

In contrast, Head of the Office, Betty Fung explained in 2017 that PICO would become a more transparent organisation involving various stakeholders. Within the government, PICO would coordinate among policy bureaus and provide policy recommendations for them. This is because policy bureaus are often preoccupied with their statutory, administrative tasks and ad hoc duties. Thus, they might lack the capacity to conduct comprehensive policy research.

Outside of the government, PICO had collaborated with over 10 think tanks and universities. In the Legislative Council document explaining the function of PICO, it was specifically mentioned that the policy research carried out by PICO would collaborate with local and external academia and think tanks.

However, the expansion of PICO's target audience also means that it is no longer one of the most important sources of policy analysis of the CE. In previous years, CPU has been regarded as the inner "Executive Council" of the CE.

=== Differences in roles ===
PICO inherits the majority of CPU's function. However, it is worth noting that one thing has changed significantly. PICO no longer exercises the duty of "detecting and assessing community concerns and public opinions", one of CPU's core functions. When Lau Siu Kai was leading CPU, it conducted public opinion surveys weekly and analysed public responses. Moreover, an unofficial duty of the CPU was to make important policy decisions based on the public opinion collected. CPU was once regarded as the "War Room" of the government. As PICO does not systematically detect public opinion, it no longer plays the role of the "War Room".

==== Coordinate selected major cross-bureaux policies ====
PICO is responsible for coordination of selected major cross-bureaux policies proposed by the Chief Executive and the Secretaries of Departments to help achieve policy objectives. Many innovative and comprehensive solutions to social problems require cross-bureax and inter-departmental cooperation. Thus, a research institution is needed to formulate effective policy responses that address the pressing social challenges and drive such policy innovations beyond the conventional and institutional boundaries.

Differing from CPU, PICO attempts to engage with the policy bureau closely in the whole policy research process, this includes selections of research topics, study scopes, collection of information and formulation of policy options. PICO would also coordinate cross-bureaux policies' implementation plans and monitor progress.

==== Provide public sector and policy consultation services for the private sector ====
Government consultancy to facilitate innovative development projects is a practice developed from Carrie Lam's experience as the Secretary for Development and Chief Secretary for Administration. She established a small dedicated office in the Development Bureau in 2009-2012 and in the Chief Secretary for Administration's Office in 2012–2017. Due to the positive feedback given to such practice, Carrie Lam included it in PICO.

The purpose of the "first-stop and one-stop" consultation is to allow the private sector and non-profit organisations to understand more about the public sector's viewpoints on their proposed innovative projects by offering co-ordinated advisory services to them.

==== Provide more opportunities for young people to directly participate in public policy formation ====
Compared to CPU, PICO is particularly focused on the recruitment of young people. When PICO was first established, it recruited 20 young people. 90% of PICO's staff were under 35 years old. This is different from CPU's practice of hiring reputable academia. It has been analysed that the purpose of recruiting more young people is to increase communication with the younger generation and include more young people into the governmental system.

== Achievements ==
=== Implementation of objectives ===
Since the establishment of PICO, it has provided "first-stop and one-stop" consultation and co-ordination services for 24 projects and co-ordinated the Chief Executive's annual Policy Address and approved about 30 research projects under the PPR Funding Scheme and the SPPR Funding Scheme each year. Chief Secretary for Administration Matthew Cheung also stated that PICO helped bureaux to "remove red tape" by reviewing existing legislation and conducting policy research on cross-bureaux issues in order to formulate solutions or legislative amendment proposals.

=== 2022 Employment Support Scheme ===
PICO was responsible, along with the Labour and Welfare Bureau, for implementing the 2022 Employment Support Scheme. The Scheme was launched under the Anti-epidemic Fund to provide wage subsidies to employers for three months (i.e. May, June and July 2022) to retain their current employees or even employ more staff when the business revives as soon as the epidemic situation permits. Self-employed persons who were eligible could also apply for a one-off subsidy. The Scheme received applications from 29 April to 12 May 2022. PICO stated that the Scheme received an overwhelming response on the first day of application, in which they received applications from more than 42,000 employers and 27,000 self-employed persons. Head of Office Doris Ho Pui-ling, said that the response to the application was in line with expectations.

On the closing of the application, PICO said that they have received a total of 176,000 applications from employers, involving 1.66 million employees, and another 119,000 applications from self-employed persons. They stated that the number of applications was higher than their original estimates.

=== Temporary Unemployment Relief Scheme ===
Coordinating with the Home Affairs Department, PICO was also tasked with the implementation of the Temporary Unemployment Relief Scheme. The Scheme was launched under the Anti-epidemic Fund to provide a one-off subsidy of $10,000 to those who lost their jobs due to the fifth wave of the pandemic. Upon the closing of application on 13 April 2022, PICO said that they received a total of 470,000 applications, which was 57% higher than its estimation of 300,000 applications.

Head of the Office Ho Pui-ling, said that one of the reasons that the number of applications was higher than expected might be that the unemployment situation of the previous month was worse than what the government had anticipated, and that the government's estimation did not extend to employees on furlough. She emphasised that even if the total amount of subsidy exceeds the original estimate of $3 billion, they will not set a cap on it and will use emergency funds to pay for the additional expenses.

== Controversies ==
=== Doubts as to reformation from Central Policy Unit to PICO ===
Before the Policy Innovation and Coordination Office was officially established, several doubts as to the reform, in particular to the proposed structure of PICO, were raised by members of the Legislative Councillor. Legislative Councillor Regina Ip criticised the proposed structure of PICO as leaning towards civil servants because most positions would be filled by civil servants, instead of scholars or members of society as they were in the Central Policy Unit. She described such a move as "backward". Ip Kin-yuen suggested that the PICO shall be led by non-civil servants to better bring innovative ideas to the government. Eventually, the head and deputy head of the PICO remained to be part of the civil servant structure.

In 2020, Scholars Terence Lin from Beijing Institute of Hong Kong and Macau Scholars and Kay Lam from Hong Kong Policy Research Institute also pointed out that the reformation into PICO failed to address the original defects of the Central Policy Unit.

=== Lack of coordination ability ===
A core innovation of PICO is coordination of policy research and implementation among government departments. However, reports have commented on its limited coordination ability. Evidence shows that the government bureaus did not rely on PICO for policy coordination. Duplicated policy research jobs are set in PICO and the respective policy bureaus. For example, PICO has included "Education and Youth Development" and "Innovation and Technology/ Artificial Intelligence/ Re-Industrialization" as their major and strategic themes. However, Home Affairs Bureau and Innovation and Technology Bureau which are responsible for the two topics respectively have established their own policy research team within the bureau. Furthermore, Legislative Councillor Regina Ip once questioned the feasibility of having young people as coordinators.

=== Lack of political ability ===
A number of commentaries have analysed that the 2019 Anti-Extradition Bill Movement reflects the lack of political sensitivity of Carrie Lam's administration. The Executive Council's non-official member, Cheung Chi Kong, attributed the lack of political sense to PICO's replacement of CPU as PICO no longer acts as the "war room" of the government through collecting and analysing public opinion. It also fails to provide strategic opinions to the Chief Executive. Similarly, Scholars Terence Lin from Beijing Institute of Hong Kong and Macau Scholars and Kay Lam from Hong Kong Policy Research Institute also pointed out the reformation of Central Policy Unit into Policy Innovation and Coordination Office diminished the important function of assessing public sentiment and political work Central Policy Unit originally held.

This has also led to more voices suggesting the re-establishment of CPU to strengthen the political power of the Chief Executive. The former head of CPU, Lau Siu Kai pointed out that the government needs to recruit a group of experts exclusively focusing on politics, policy and long-term strategies. This is because Hong Kong's political environment and international position have become increasingly challenging, such as the unstable Taiwan strait political climate. Thus he suggested that there is a pressing need for the government to analyse the international situations and propose long-term policy reforms. PICO has been more focused on coordination and lacks the ability to conduct strategic research.

=== "Lennon Wall" in the office of PICO ===
During the 2019 Hong Kong protests, staff members of the Office created a "Lennon Wall" by posting post-in notes with political propaganda, slogans and demands on a display board in the office. Some of the slogans posted on the Lennon are politically aggressive, including "Liberate Hong Kong, revolution of our times (光復香港，時代革命)", which is later decided by the High Court that displaying such a slogan is capable of inciting others to commit secession. Such conduct received backlash from members of the pro-establishment camp while some opinions from the government suggested that government workplaces shall not be used to express political opinions to prevent negative effects on political neutrality. PICO's response stated that they have always encouraged discussion and sharing of information among colleagues through their open plan office. Secretary for the Civil Service Joshua Law admitted that political slogans were posted in the office, suggested that civil servants shall not spark internal conflicts and stated that the slogans may not be agreed upon by other colleagues.

=== Involvement in "Witman Hung Partygate" ===
During the COVID-19 pandemic, Deputy Head of PICO Vincent Fung Hao-yin attended the birthday party of Witman Hung amidst warnings against large gatherings due to the initial spread of the Omicron variant. Vincent Fung received a verbal warning from Chief Executive Carrie Lam for failure to report and continuing to work despite having received a compulsory testing notice and exposing other colleagues in a risk of being infected.

== Head ==
The Office was headed by Betty Fung Ching Suk Yee, from 3 April 2018 to 1 December 2020, before she was seconded to the West Kowloon Cultural District Authority as Acting Chief Executive Officer on 7 December 2020.

Charmaine Lee Pui Sze, deputy head of the Office, served as the acting head of the Office from 1 December 2020 to 17 January 2021.

Since 18 January 2021, the Office has been headed by Doris Ho Pui-ling, before which she was deputy secretary for development (planning and lands) at the Development Bureau.

== Previous heads of the Central Policy Unit ==
- Leo Goodstadt (1989-1997)
- Gordon Siu (1997-1999)
- Edgar Cheng Wai-kin (1999-2001)
- Lau Siu Kai (2002-2012)
- Shiu Sin-por (2012-2017)

== See also ==
Government of Hong Kong
