= United front in Hong Kong =

Strategy to incorporate Hong Kong more closely with the People's Republic of China

The united front in Hong Kong (Chinese: 香港親共主義) is a strategy directed by the Chinese Communist Party (CCP) and the Government of China to consolidate their control over Hong Kong. To accomplish this aim, a number of different strategies have been used since the 1980s. Today the control is mostly done through manipulation of local elections.

== History ==
=== 1960s–1970s ===
The Hong Kong and Kowloon Federation of Trade Unions (FTU), an umbrella trade union for the local left-wing unions, was founded in April 1948. After the Communist victory in the Chinese Civil War, the local communists remained in their semi-underground status. In the early post-war days, the Hong Kong and Kowloon Federation of Trade Unions, the Chinese General Chamber of Commerce and the Hong Kong Chinese Reform Association became the three pillars of the local pro-CCP organs, following the orders of the New China News Agency, the de facto Communist China's representative in Hong Kong. The FTU took a leading role in the 1967 Hong Kong riots, which is inspired by the 12-3 incident in the Macau, aimed at overthrowing the British colonial rule in Hong Kong. The leftists lost their prestige after the riots for a period of time as the general public was against the violence attributed to the leftists, although the presence of the pro-Beijing Maoist elements remained strong in the universities and colleges throughout the 1970s Hong Kong student protests, in which many of the pro-CCP university and college graduates became the backbones of the pro-Beijing camp today.

=== 1980s ===
In the 1980s, Beijing tried to control the territory by absorbing Hong Kong's business elite into the united front system. The business members were designated as "delegates" and "advisers".

After the 1989 Tiananmen Square protests and massacre, the CCP changed its strategy. Because the working and peasant classes far outnumbered the appointed government elite, the CCP realized they could not afford to let democracy take root in the general populace and consequently expanded their focus to garner support among Hong Kong's working class. They explicitly targeted the leadership of Kaifong associations, district boards and local municipal councils.

Up until the 1980s, the CCP did not want to form its own pro-CCP political parties in Hong Kong as the democracy ideology was more popular. But the pro-Beijing camp officially established the political party Democratic Alliance for the Betterment of Hong Kong in 1992 to participate in the local three-tier parliamentary elections.

=== Post 1997 ===
In December 2017, Wang Zhenmin, the legal chief for the China Liaison Office, confirmed that the CCP was actively promoting its agenda of 'Mainlandization' of Hong Kong. He was quoted saying "Since 1 July 1997, Hong Kong’s political colour undoubtedly became red, meaning it has become part of red China. So there is no question of whether Hong Kong is "becoming red" because Hong Kong has already been red since 1997, when it came under the leadership of the Chinese Communist Party". In May 2018, Jonathan Choi Koon-shum and Leung Chun-ying, prominent figures from the pro-Beijing camp, started promoting the concept of "Greater Bay Area identity" in order to counter Hong Kong localism and self-determination and as presenting a possible future for Hong Kong after 2047.

== Strategies ==
The representative of the government of mainland China in Hong Kong is the Liaison Office, with Hong Kong branch of Xinhua News Agency historically occupying this role. As the force that controls the China government, the CCP is the driving force that controls the office's affairs.

The united front coordinates the nomination and campaigns in the Legislative Council (LegCo) and local elections. Sometimes part of the party is listed as "independents" and run for elections. An example is Regina Ip in the 2007 Hong Kong Island by-election. In 2005, the front did not destroy democratic individuals (like Anson Chan), because the political cost of doing so was too high. It basically keeps the opposing parties divided so they are weak and non-threatening. In this case, the opposing enemy is Hong Kong's democratic party, because it represents the wishes of the pro-democracy camp.

While the one country, two systems separated Hong Kong and Macau from Beijing rule, it attempted to swing voters away from the democratic parties to keep them weak. An example is the Democratic Alliance for the Betterment and Progress of Hong Kong, which was installed to target middle to lower class citizens in Hong Kong by gaining presence in the Hong Kong real estate market.

== Allies ==
The front also rely on allies that have grassroots in Hong Kong's society such as the following:

- Hong Kong Federation of Trade Unions (HKFTU)
- Democratic Alliance for the Betterment and Progress of Hong Kong (DAB)
- New Territories Association of Societies (NTAS)
- Politihk Social Strategic
- Silent Majority for Hong Kong
- Voice of Loving Hong Kong

== See also ==
- Politics of Hong Kong
- Conservatism in Hong Kong
- Socialism in Hong Kong
- 2010 Hong Kong electoral reform
- 2014–2015 Hong Kong electoral reform
- Pro-Beijing camp (Hong Kong)
- United Front Work Department
- United front (China)
  - United front in Taiwan
