= Hong Kong Ta Kung Wen Wei Media Group =

Chinese state-owned media company

The Hong Kong Ta Kung Wen Wei Media Group（Chinese: 香港大公文匯傳媒集團，HKTKWW) is a media group formed by the merger of Hong Kong's Ta Kung Pao, the world's oldest Chinese newspaper still in circulation, and Wen Wei Po. After the merge, the two newspapers still have their own publications, but from pooled editorial and technical resources of the group. The group has one of the largest circulations of newspapers in Hong Kong, with a distribution network covering Hong Kong, the China mainland and overseas. In addition, there are several digital platforms. Administered by China's central government liaison office in Hong Kong, the group holds pro-China pro-Hong Kong government position.

== History ==
Ta Kung Pao was founded in Tianjin in 1902. It is the world's oldest Chinese-language newspaper stilled published. The Chinese name "大公" means "selfless and public-spirited".

During the World War Two, Ta Kung Pao stood firm in their position against Japanese aggression and continued publishing newspapers while relocating across multiple cities in China.

After 1949, under the leadership of the Chinese Communist Party, Ta Kung Pao was published and distributed in Hong Kong.

Wen Wei Po was founded in Shanghai in 1939. It was suspended in 1947 due to the government's dissatisfaction.

On September 9, 1948, the Hong Kong edition of Wen Wei Po was launched.

On February 1, 2016, the Hong Kong Ta Kung Wen Wei Media Group was founded by the merger of Hong Kong's Ta Kung Pao and Wen Wei Po. After the merge, the two newspapers still have their own publications, but from pooled editorial and technical resources of the group.

On June 12, 2022, a grand ceremony was held in Hong Kong to cerebrate the 120 anniversary of Ta Kung Pao. National president Xi Jinping sent a congratulation letter to the group, according to a report by the Hong Kong and Macao Affairs Office of the central government.

In May 2023, the group signed an agreement with the Guangzhou Daily Group to jointly explore media development in the Guangdong–Hong Kong–Macao Greater Bay Area.

== Members ==
The group owns:

- Ta Kung Pao
- Wen Wei Po
- Dot Dot News
- Lion Rock Daily

== Other information ==
The group holds pro-China pro-Hong Kong government position, supporting the “One Country, Two Systems” policies.

It has one of the largest circulations of newspapers in Hong Kong, with a distribution network covering Hong Kong, the mainland and overseas.

Address: 3/F, Hing Wai Centre, 7 Tin Wan Waterfront Road, Aberdeen, Hong Kong. Email: contact@dotdotnews.com.

== See also ==
- Newspapers of Hong Kong
- Wen Wei Po
- The New Evening Post
