= One Country Two Systems Research Institute =

One Country Two Systems Research Institute 一國兩制研究中心
- Formation: 6 November 1990
- Type: Public policy think tank
- Headquarters: Portion B, 61/F Bank of China Tower, 1 Garden Road, Central, Hong Kong
- Members: ~45
- Official language: Chinese and English
- Executive Director: Cheung Chi-kong
- Key people: Albert Chen Hung-yee, Lau Siu-kai, T. K. Ann, Leung Chun-ying, Shiu Sin-por
- Affiliations: Pro-Beijing camp
- Website: www.octs.org.hk

The One Country Two Systems Research Institute (OCTS; Chinese:一國兩制研究中心) is a Hong Kong think tank founded in 1990 by a group of pro-Beijing politicians. It is registered in Hong Kong as a Private Company non-profit company with limited liability and has been granted the status of a public interest charitable organisation by the Government of Hong Kong. The OCTS is a non-governmental organisation specializing in Hong Kong's public policy. Between 1990 and 2005, Shiu Sin-por served as the institute's leader.

== History and activities ==
The "one country, two systems" Principle was formulated through negotiations between the UK and China, in recognition of the historical, cultural, and socio-economic differences between Mainland China and Hong Kong. This principle was implemented on 1 July 1997, the day Hong Kong was reunified with China. It serves as the foundation of Hong Kong's legal framework. The principle outlines the governance structure of Hong Kong. The validity of this principle is set to last for 50 years, concluding in 2047.

The One Country Two Systems Research Institute (OCTS) is an independent research organisation that focuses on studying and analysing the implementation and effectiveness of the one country, two systems principle. The organisation primarily conducts research on the social and economic issues of the Hong Kong Special Administrative Region (HKSAR).

== See also ==
- One country, two systems
- List of think tanks in Hong Kong
- pro-Beijing Camp
- pro-Democracy Camp
