= Lau Nai-keung =

Hong Kong politician

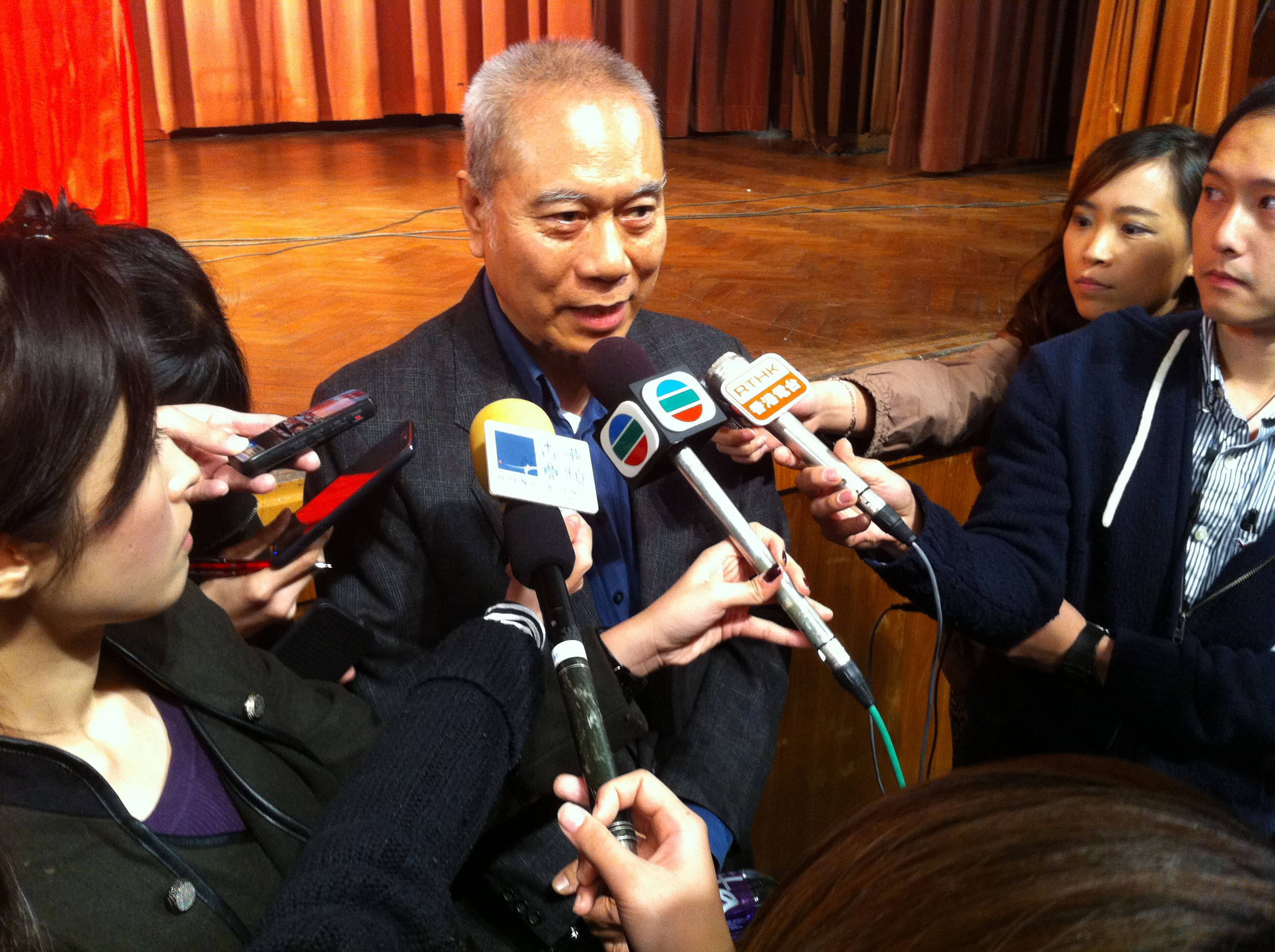
Lau speaking at a Voice of Loving Hong Kong event in 2013

Lau Nai-keung SBS (Chinese: 劉迺強; pinyin: Liú Nǎiqiáng, 1947 – 21 November 2018) was a Hong Kong academic, businessman, and politician. He held several positions in the government of the Hong Kong Special Administrative Region and various universities and businesses. He advocated for greater political and economic integration between the Hong Kong SAR and mainland China.

Lau was the chairman of Long View Cultural Services Limited, a research fellow at Hong Kong Polytechnic University, a member of the Basic Law Consultative Committee and the Commission on Strategic Development as well as a visiting professor at Jinan University and the Beijing Business Management College.

Lau wrote many articles for the South China Morning Post, China Daily, and other publications promoting greater economic and governmental integration between the Hong Kong Special Administrative Region and the People's Republic of China.

== Biography ==
Lau received a Bachelor of Social Sciences degree in economics from the University of Hong Kong in 1970. He worked as a tutor in the university's statistics department and as economist at the Hong Kong Export Credit Insurance Corporation, among other businesses.

Lau was a member of the Chinese People’s Political Consultative Conference from 1987 to 2007, where he was on the Committee on Population, Resources and Environment Studies, and has held numerous other positions in the SAR government.

Party political offices
| New title | Chairman of Meeting Point; 1983–1988 | Succeeded by Yeung Sum |
