= Leo Goodstadt =

British economist (1938–2020)

Leo F. Goodstadt

Head of Central Policy Unit
- In office 12 April 1989 – 30 June 1997
- Governor: Sir David Wilson; Chris Patten
- Preceded by: Office established
- Succeeded by: Gordon Siu

Personal details
- Born: 21 April 1938; Andover, England
- Died: 24 April 2020 (aged 82); Dublin, Ireland
- Education: University of Oxford; University of Manchester
- Occupation: Economist

Leo Francis Goodstadt, CBE, JP (Chinese: 顧汝德, 21 April 1938 - 24 April 2020) was a British economist based in Hong Kong. He served as the first head of Central Policy Unit, from 1989 to 1997.

== Life ==
Goodstadt studied economics at the University of Oxford and the University of Manchester, and arrived at Hong Kong in 1962 as a Commonwealth Scholar.

He had a long but intermittent career at the University of Hong Kong (HKU). He was a lecturer in economics from 1964 to 1966; an honorary lecturer in law from 1979 to 1985; an honorary research fellow at its then Centre of Asian Studies (CAS) between 1977 and 1998, and again between 2005 and 2011; and an honorary institute fellow at the institution's Hong Kong Institute for the Humanities and Social Sciences since 2011. In 2001, he was named an HKU Honorary University Fellow.

In 1989, Goodstadt was appointed by then-Governor Sir David Wilson as the head of the newly established Central Policy Unit. He kept serving in the role after Chris Patten succeeded Wilson in 1992, and retired following the handover of Hong Kong in 1997, after which he moved to Dublin and became an adjunct professor at Trinity Business School, Trinity College Dublin.

He was also known for his reporting on Hong Kong, when in 1966 he was the deputy editor of the now-defunct Far Eastern Economic Review for ten years, with coverage specially on Hong Kong and China. Goodstadt served as editorial director of Asiabanking between 1981 and 1986, as well as Hong Kong correspondent for Euromoney (1978-1988) and the Times (1967-1973). He has been a regular contributor to the BBC and previously hosted a weekly public affairs program on Asia Television, a local television station, for ten years.

== Works ==
=== Books ===
- Uneasy Partners: The Conflict between Public Interest and Private Profit in Hong Kong. Hong Kong University Press. 2005. ISBN 978-988-8028-09-2.
- Profits, Politics and Panics: Hong Kong's Banks and the Making of a Miracle Economy, 1935-1985. Hong Kong University Press. 2007. ISBN 978-962-209-896-1.
- Reluctant Regulators: How the West Created and China Survived the Global Financial Crisis. Hong Kong University Press. 2011. ISBN 978-988-8083-25-1.
- Poverty in the Midst of Affluence: How Hong Kong Mismanaged Its Prosperity. Hong Kong University Press. 2013. ISBN 978-988-8208-22-7.
- A City Mismanaged: Hong Kong's Struggle for Survival. Hong Kong University Press. 2018. ISBN 978-988-8528-49-3.

=== Selected articles ===
- Rejected immigrants? The Chinese connection. Hong Kong Law Journal 4:223–41 (1974).
- The overseas Chinese: A model of stability. The Round Table 65(259):251–62 (1975).
- Official Targets, Data and Policies for China's Population Growth: An Assessment. Population and Development Review 4(2):255-275 (1978).
- Taxation and Economic Modernization in Contemporary China. Development and Change, 10(3):403-421 (1979).
- Hong Kong: An attachment to democracy. The Round Table 87(348):485–503 (1998).
- China and the Selection of Hong Kong's Post-Colonial Political Elite. China Quarterly 163:721–41 (2000).
- The Rise and Fall of Social, Economic and Political Reforms in Hong Kong, 1930–1955. Journal of the Royal Asiatic Society Hong Kong Branch 44:57–81 (2004).
- Fiscal freedom and the making of Hong Kong's capitalist society. China Information 24(3):273–94 (2010).
- The Hong Kong e-Identity Card: Examining the Reasons for Its Success When Other Cards Continue to Struggle. Information Systems Management 32(1):72–80 (2015). (with Regina Connolly and Frank Bannister)

== Honours and awards ==
- Justice of the peace (JP) (1983)
- Commander of the Most Excellent Order of the British Empire (CBE) (1996)
- University of Hong Kong Honorary Fellow (2001)
- Trinity College Dublin Honorary Fellow (2015)

== Family ==
Goodstadt married Rose Young on 19 April 1965 at St. Theresa's Church. Rose, a social worker, worked for many years at the Social Welfare Department, eventually serving as deputy director of Social Welfare. She also founded the Hong Kong Society for the Aged (SAGE), and was a co-founder of the Association of Female Senior Government Officers, a powerful staff association that campaigned for equal treatment of men and women in the Hong Kong civil service.

The couple had a son, John. John graduated from Wah Yan College, Hong Kong in 1987. He is currently a professor in physiology at Oxford University.
