= Cheung Chi-kong =

Hong Kong politician (born 1959)

Cheung Chi-kong, GBS, BBS, JP (born 1959 in Hong Kong) is a Hong Kong pro-establishment camp politician and pundit. He is also a former non-official member of the Executive Council of Hong Kong. His writing and political views are known to be adhering strongly to the Chinese Communist Party.

== Background ==
Cheung obtained his Bachelor of Social Science and Master of Business Administration from Chinese University of Hong Kong. He is also the executive director of the One Country Two Systems Research Institute.

In December 2016, Cheung Chi-kwong pointed out in Ming Pao's article ‘The Penumbra: The Political Wisdom of Lord Tsang Man-ching’ that ‘Hong Kong is by nature a special administrative region directly under the Central Government, and the Chief Executive is subject to the appointment and supervision of the Central Government, and must be accountable to the Central Government. Therefore, the power of the Central Government to decide on the Chief Executive is beyond doubt’, indicating that the selection of the Chief Executive is preordained by the Central Government.

== Honours ==
- Bronze Bauhinia Star in 2011
- Justice of the Peace in 2014
- Gold Bauhinia Star in 2017
