= Shiu Sin-por =

Shiu Sin-por, GBS, is a Hong Kong government bureaucrat, academic and former politician. He was the head of the Central Policy Unit, reporting directly to Hong Kong Chief Executive. He is also a senior visiting fellow at the School of Policy and Management of Tsinghua University in Beijing and was formerly a member of the 10th National Committee of the Chinese Peoples' Consultative Conference.

== Education ==
Shiu graduated from the University of Wisconsin and completed postgraduate work at Cornell University. From 2005 to 2006 he was an Asia Programs Fellow at the John F. Kennedy School of Government at Harvard University. He also did postgraduate work at Tsinghua University from 2006 to 2007.

== Career ==
In 1996, while Shiu was Deputy Secretary General of the Preparatory Committee in Hong Kong, he urged Democratic Party members to have a more positive attitude towards China to improve their chances of getting seats on the selection committee for the first chief executive of the HKSAR.

In 2003, Shiu was executive director of the pro-China thinktank One Country Two Systems Research Institute. While in this position, Shiu published an article arguing that the Cheng v Tse court decision tilted the balance of power too far against private rights, especially in non-political contexts.

On 27 July 2007 Shiu was named as a full-time member of the Central Policy Unit, assisting Prof Lau Siu-kai in advising the Chief Executive, the Chief Secretary and the Financial Secretary on various political and social issues, and to conduct policy research. He remained a member until his appointment to head the unit in July 2012, two weeks after CY Leung became Chief Executive.

According to U.S. diplomatic cables leaked in December 2012, Shiu told U.S. diplomats that Chinese leaders were not willing to cede complete control over Hong Kong's first direct election for its leader in 2017, and would ensure individuals deemed unacceptable to Beijing would never get nominated or elected as Hong Kong’s leader.

Chiu's research work has included the history of Hong Kong's return to China, the development of politics and the political system in Hong Kong, and the economic and social relationship between Hong Kong and the mainland.

Shiu was succeeded in April 2018 by Betty Fung Ching Suk Yee, who now heads the successor of the CPU Policy Innovation and Co-ordination Unit.
