= Alliance for Peace and Democracy (Hong Kong) =

Pro-Beijing organization in Hong Kong

- Chinese: 保普選保和平大聯盟
- Formation: 3 July 2014; 12 years ago
- Purpose: Conservatism; Anti-Occupy Central
- Spokespersons: Robert Chow, Ng Chau-pei, Brave Chan Yung
- Affiliations: Pro-Beijing camp
- Website: www.peaceforhk.com
- Formerly called: 保普選反佔中大聯盟

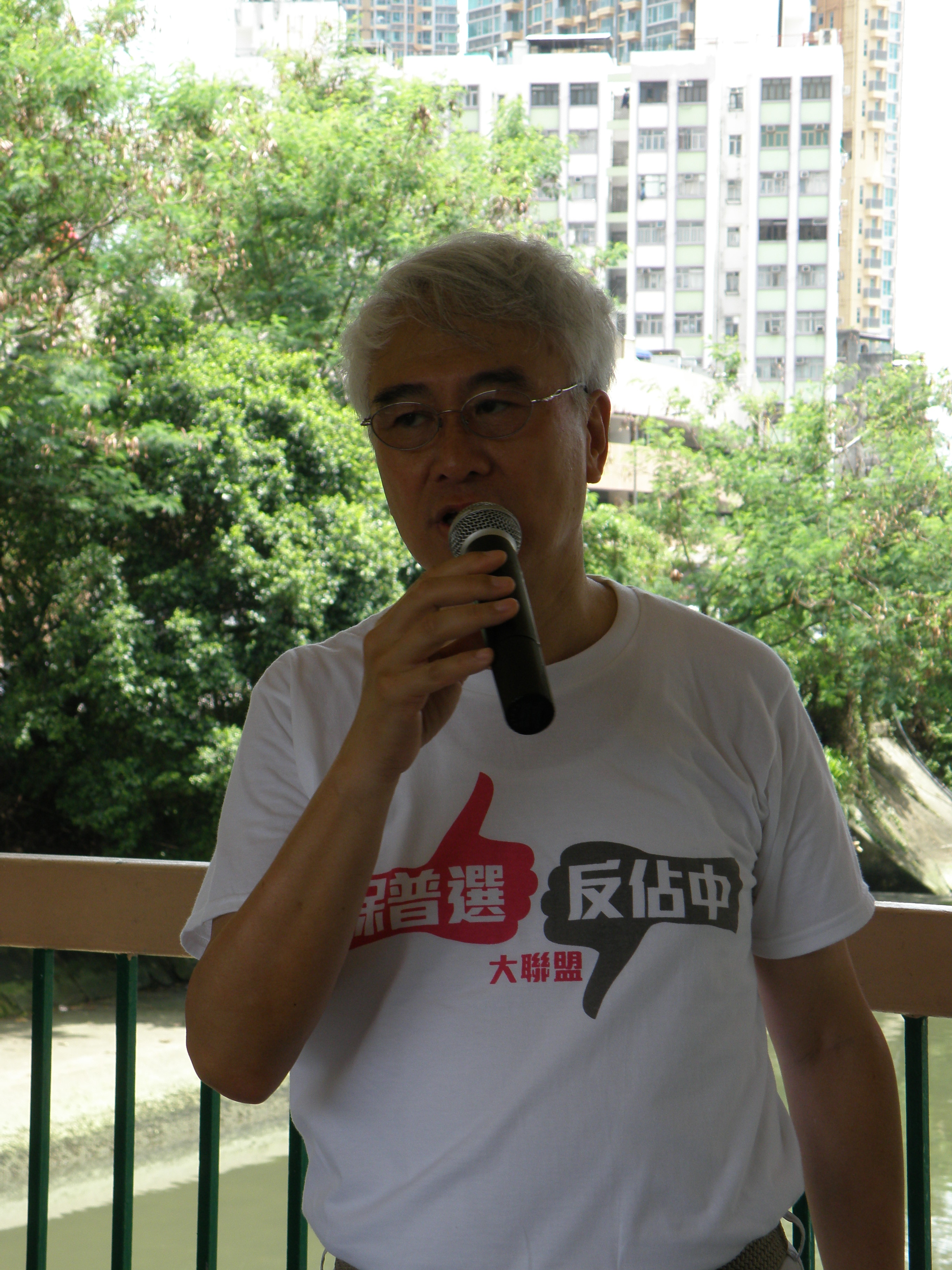
Robert Chow, spokesman of the Alliance for Peace and Democracy.

The former logo of the alliance.

The Alliance for Peace and Democracy (Chinese: 保普選保和平大聯盟; lit. 'The Protect-Universal Suffrage and Protect-Peace Alliance', formerly 保普選反佔中大聯盟, literally: "The Protect-Universal Suffrage and Anti-Occupy Central Alliance") is a pro-Beijing political group based in Hong Kong. It was founded on 3 July 2014 by members of the pro-Beijing alliance including 40 pro-Beijing groups and scholars, many of whom are also members of the pro-Beijing group Silent Majority for Hong Kong, and was backed by the pro-Beijing Parties Democratic Alliance for the Betterment and Progress of Hong Kong, The Hong Kong Federation of Trade Unions and The New People's Party.

The Alliance was established to counter the Occupy Central movement, and it received widespread media attention when it launched a month-long signature campaign for people who oppose the Occupy Central Movement, which lasted from 19 July to 17 August 2014. The campaign claimed it had collected over a million signatures supporting the campaign, although questions were raised over credibility of the number of signatures collected. Despite the Alliance's efforts, the Occupy Central movement commenced officially on 27 September 2014, giving rise to the 2014 Hong Kong protests which was severely criticised by the Alliance. The Alliance also admitted that they underestimated the impact of the movement.

The Alliance subsequently launched a second signature campaign after the commencement of the Occupy Central movement, demanding protesters to "free our roads" and to "restore law and order". It lasted from 25 October 2014 to 2 November 2014. A third signature campaign was held by the alliance after the Occupy Central movement from 9 May 2015 to 17 May 2015, amassing support for the 2014–15 Hong Kong electoral reform.

== First Signature campaign ==
On 19 July 2014, the Alliance launched a signature campaign for "people who support democracy and universal suffrage, but oppose violence and the Occupy Central Movement" (Chinese: 「保和平、保普選，反暴力、反佔中」簽名行動). According to the Alliance's spokesman Robert Chow, the Alliance aims to collect at least 800,000 signature, likely an attempt to top the nearly 790,000 votes cast in Occupy Central's unofficial referendum held in June 2014. On 2 August 2014, the Alliance further launched an online platform to collect signatures from people who oppose Occupy Central's campaign.

The authority official endorsements include chief executive CY Leung and other top Hong Kong officials, including Chief Secretary for Administration Carrie Lam, Secretary for Food and Health Ko Wing-man, Secretary for Labour and Welfare Matthew Cheung, Secretary for Commerce and Economic Development Gregory So and Secretary for Development Paul Chan. The Alliance claimed it had collected over 1.5 million signatures at the end of the campaign.

Media and individuals, especially those support the pro-democracy camp, have questioned the credibility of the signature campaign. They have noted that no measures were put in place to prevent repeated signatures in the campaign, as people who sign will be asked for only the letter and first four digits of their HKID cards. According to some press reports, employees might have faced pressure to sign petition forms that were being circulated by department heads in some companies, including Town Gas, a major public utility.

== "Run for Peace and Democracy" before parade ==
The Alliance held a 3.2-km "Run for Peace and Democracy" as a prelude to the Anti-"Occupy Central" Parade from Victoria Park to the Chater Road in Central. The Alliance had called for 10,000 people to take part in the fun run. On 17 August 2014, the organisers claimed 1,500 participants took part in the race, while the police estimated 880.

== Anti-"Occupy Central" parade ==
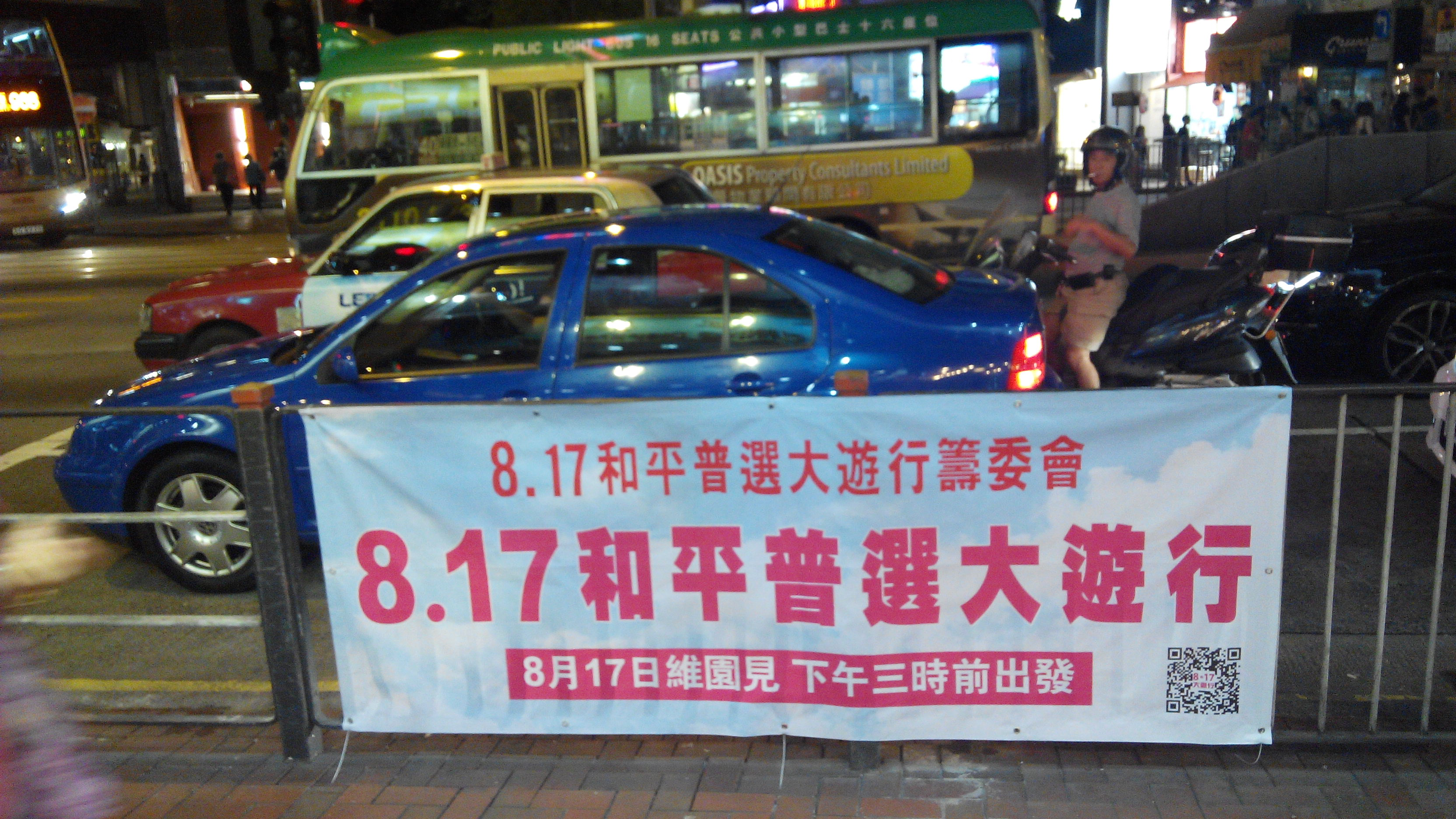
A banner promoting the Anti-"Occupy Central" parade.

Culminating their petition campaign, the Alliance held an anti-"Occupy Central" parade on 17 August 2014, where participants will be able to dedicate kapok (Bombax ceiba) flowers at Chater Garden or Statue Square to show their discontent towards the Occupy Central Movement, their desire for peace in Central as well as their support for universal suffrage. The alliance declared that over 320 organisations and groups had pledged to join the rallies, and they expected a turnout of 50,000 to 60,000.

The Alliance initially claimed that 193,000 people took part in the parade, but it later changed the figure to 250,000, while the Hong Kong police set the figure at 111,800 and the University of Hong Kong Public Opinion Programme put the maximum number of participants at 88,000.

=== Controversies ===
After the rally, media reports claiming that the anti-Occupy Central movement engaged in "rent-a-protester" to boost numbers at the rally, surfaced. The Alliance and its allies were accused of offering people; cash, free-meals and pecuniary benefits in an attempt to boost the turnout at the Anti-Occupy Central Parade. The media reported that the groups had put on cross-border transport to bring in marchers and that as many as 20,000 people may have been bussed in from across the border. Robert Chow, the spokesman of the Alliance, responded that he saw nothing improper in distributing lunch boxes to groups joining the parade as a token of thanks.

Video footage showing people "being paid" to take part in the parade were captured by the media.

=== Cable TV faces legal action over report ===
The Alliance for Peace and Democracy said one of its groups will take legal action against Cable TV. The station had reported some people appeared to have been paid to take part in Sunday's mass anti-Occupy Central march, which was organised by the Alliance. The Alliance said the Hong Kong Youth Association denied the claim and people filmed accepting money were not members. It also accused Cable TV of dishonest editing, a charge the broadcaster has dismissed.

Chow said it had found that a subsidiary of another group, the Hong Kong Hakka Associations, had paid people to join the march. He said the 200 people involved had been deleted from the Alliance's estimated turnout for the rally, which stands at more than 190,000. Undercover reporters also filed reports of payments of HK$200–$350 ($25–45) and other gifts of food items as inducements being made to participants by various organising sub-groups.

In response to this, Hong Kong Youth Association, one of the groups filmed by reporters, threatened Cable TV News with legal action over the "dishonest editing", implying it had used imposters. The Alliance itself initially stonewalled and denied anybody had been paid, and accused media of fabricating reports. Chow later admitted that Hong Kong Hakka Associations had paid people to join the march, and pledged to cross out 200 paid individuals from the estimated turnout of the parade. The Alliance further admitted that a subsidiary of one of its member groups, the General Association of Hong Kong Heyuan Societies, had also paid people varying amounts of cash to join the match.

== Class boycott database ==
In response to the 2014 NPCSC decision, Hong Kong Federation of Students and the student pro-democracy pressure group Scholarism planned to stage a co-ordinated class boycott in Hong Kong and organise public events, including street assemblies. To ward off a massive mobilisation, the APD set up a telephone hotline with the objective of collecting data on high school students who participate in the boycott to "save underaged youths from being exploited". Chow said that the information would be passed on to the boycotters' schools, PTAs and the education bureau, and threatened to make the information public.

Federation of Students secretary general denounced the Alliance hotline as "white terror, political persecution and fear-mongering trying to pressure the parents and a violation of privacy". The denunciations hotline received strong criticism from the education sector. Ip Kin-yuen, representing the education sector in LegCo, condemned the alliance for pressuring the schools and as well as students, and urged educators to uphold students' rights to freedom speech. Headmasters of Shatin Tsung Tsin Secondary School, among others, said there was no need for the alliance to notify them of boycotters' names, saying that he knew who they were and that they had his blessing. The headmaster of Diocesan Boys' School said the affairs of its students on the school's own turf need not be the concern of others. The school principals expressed trust in and respect for their students. In its editorial, Ming Pao strongly criticised the Cultural Revolution-style intelligence-gathering on individuals for political purposes as "highly divisive". It said that it was difficult to see from any angle how such a campaign had any benefit, the effects of this political intervention by the alliance on Hong Kong and within school campuses can only be adverse and highly destructive. Secretary for Education said on 10 September that the Education Bureau would liaise with relevant schools upon information of boycotts, and would offer assistance as required by the schools. After receiving complaints from teaching unions, the office of the Privacy Commissioner said that there was "no evidence to suggest that the alliance has applied unlawful and misleading means" to acquire the personal data, but reminded the APD to abide by its obligations under the ordinance. In the meantime, the alliance temporarily suspended the operation of its telephone hotline, blaming it on the deluge of prank calls, but invited the public to continue to submit their denunciations by fax or email. An editorial in The Standard said the hotline was "riddled with fault", and suggested that the alliance shut down the line definitively.

== Subsequent signature campaigns ==
The Alliance held a second signature campaign, from 25 October 2014 to 2 November 2014, for a petition that seek to "support our police, free our roads; restore law and order" in Hong Kong. Like its first signature campaign, questions were raised over the credibility of this second campaign. The alliance had claimed that there were 1.83 million signatures.

The Alliance subsequently changed its Chinese name to 保普選反暴力大聯盟 (literally: "The Protect-Universal Suffrage and Anti-violence Alliance") on 5 May 2015 after the 2014 Hong Kong protests to reflect its change in aim from anti-Occupy Central to anti-Gau wu and anti-Hong Kong independence movement which, according to the Alliance, constituted acts of violence. Its English name remained unchanged. The Alliance subsequently held a third signature campaign from 9 May 2015 to 17 May 2015 to amass support for democracy in Hong Kong and the 2014–15 Hong Kong electoral reform (Chinese: 保民主 撐政改) and to voice opposition to the ongoing filibustering in Hong Kong (Chinese: 反拉布). The campaign also encouraged Hong Kong citizens to register as voters (Chinese: 做選民). The alliance claimed that 1.21 million signatures were received.

In response to the Hong Kong Legislative Council oath-taking controversy, the Alliance changed its Chinese name again, this time to 反辱華反港獨大聯盟 (literally: "The Anti-Sinophobia and Anti-Hong Kong Independence Alliance") on 24 October 2016, and launched an online petition condemning Youngspiration legislator Yau Wai-ching for her slurs. The alliance claimed 24,000 people signed the petition.
