= Voice of Loving Hong Kong =

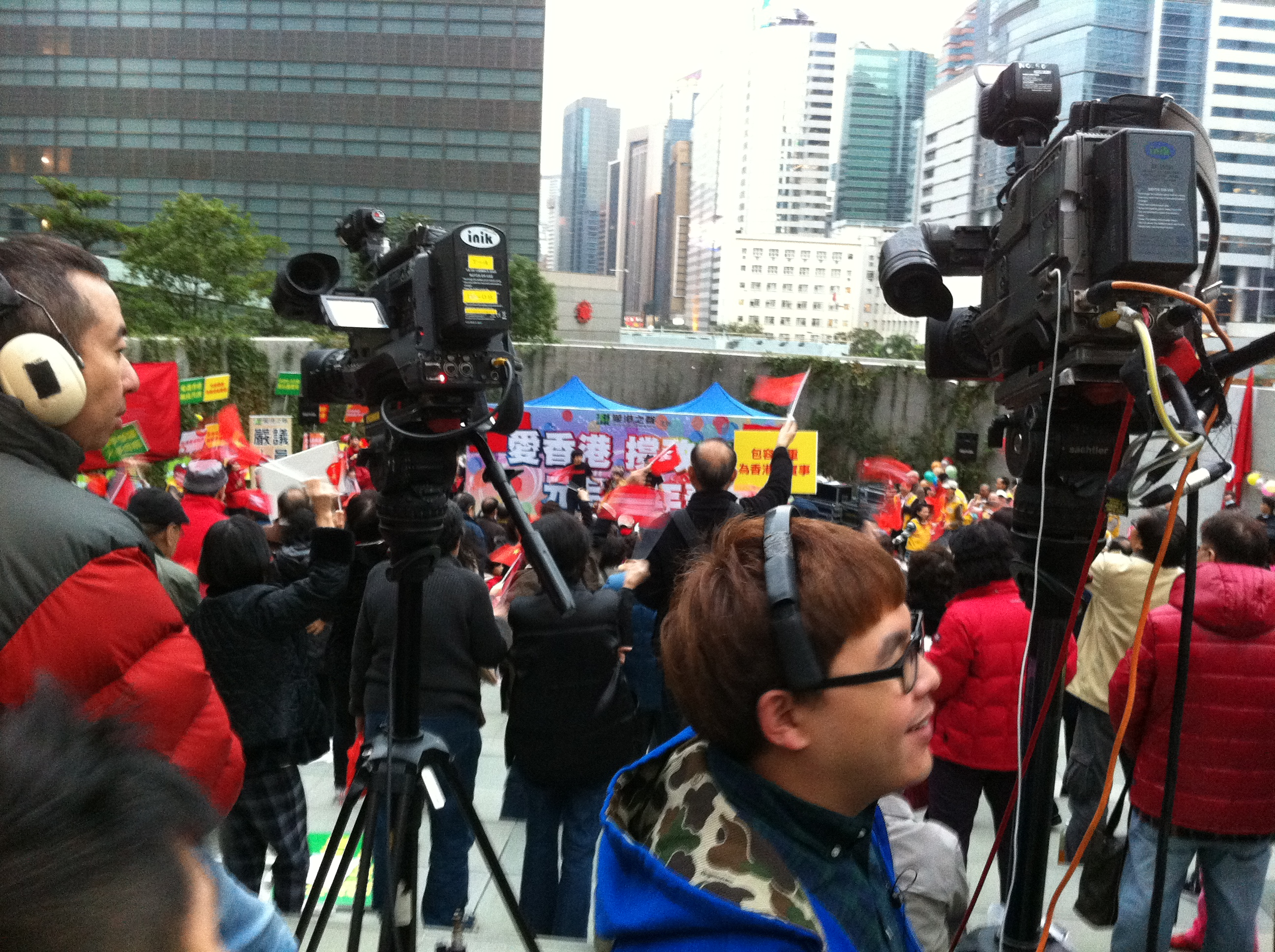
Gathering of the "Voice of Loving Hong Kong" held in the Tamar Amphitheatre, Admiralty, Hong Kong in January 1st, 2013

Voice of Loving Hong Kong (Chinese: 愛港之聲) is a radical pro-Beijing camp organisation and pressure group. Created by businessman and activist Patrick Ko, initially as a Facebook page, its stated aim is to show solidarity with and support for the CY Leung administration. It organises rallies and counter-demonstrations in opposition to anti-government and anti-Beijing demonstrations.

== History ==
Voice of Loving Hong Kong should not be confused with Caring Hong Kong Power, which in Chinese has a similar name (愛護香港力量). "Caring Hong Kong Power", which organised the December 30, 2012 "pro Hong Kong" march, is famous for its members coming into conflict with reporters from Now TV and anti-Leung activists. Despite "Voice of Loving Hong Kong" and "Caring Hong Kong Power" both being in the Pro-Beijing camp, members of the two parties flame each other on social media.

"Voice of Loving Hong Kong", "Caring Hong Kong Power" and organisations such as "Hong Kong Youth Care Association Limited" (香港青年關愛協會) form a loose coalition referred to as the "Love Hong Kong faction" (愛字派). "Voice of Loving Hong Kong" and "Caring Hong Kong Power" can be differentiated in that "Voice" uses banners and printed material featuring computer generated and colourful cartoon-like Chinese characters, and "Care" uses material featuring red characters, using traditional Chinese calligraphy in regular script, on a white background. These various factions are united in opposition to the pan-democracy camp and in their antagonism to Falun Gong.

On New Year's Day 2013, "Voice of Loving Hong Kong" organised an event it called the "Love Hong Kong, support the government, New Year's Day Carnival" (愛香港、撐政府 元旦嘉年華). Despite being labelled a "carnival", the event held at the Tamar Amphitheatre, in Tamar Park, Admiralty, was seen as a counter protest mounted against an anti-Leung demonstration held by the Civil Human Rights Front on the same day. Patrick Ko, in defence against accusations that "Voice" had timed and sited its event as a deliberate provocation, stated that the "carnival" was apolitical, was independent of outside powers and that he hoped that it would "Convert anger into harmony". He stated that the public, being rational, would overcome differences, and that he did not foresee violence.

"Voice of Loving Hong Kong" attends pan-democracy debates and events, with the aim of forcing the abandonment of the events, primarily through the use of heckling.

"Voice" members hold the position that "The Chinese government was forced to mobilize the army for national security," and that "no one died in Tiananmen Square". In its opinion, continued remembrance of Tiananmen Square is mistaken and only serves to make people unhappy, and that in order to move on it is best to let go of the memory and sorrow of those events, to "forgive and forget". In 2014, on the eve of the 25th anniversary of the Tiananmen Square protests of 1989, "Voice of Hong Kong" members gathered outside Tin Hau station and distributed leaflets. This brought "Voice" members into conflict with members of the public and what began as an exchange of words escalated into an exchange of blows. Police had to separate the two sides and erected barriers to keep the two sides apart.

== Membership and key people ==
"Voice of Loving Hong Kong" has a membership of over 3000, with a core membership of about 30, most of whom are native born Hong Kong residents. Through its partnerships and connections it can mobilise tens of thousands more for events and rallies.

=== Patrick Ko ===
Patrick Ko Tat-pun (Chinese: 高達斌) is a graduate of Hong Kong Polytechnic University, who became involved in politics in the 1980s, initially joining the Meeting Point, a predecessor of the current pan-democratic camp Democratic Party. Currently he is a member of the New People's Party.

Ko rose to media prominence in 2012 after instigating multiple "Support Leung Demonstrations" (挺梁遊行) as part of a "Support the CY Leung Administration" campaign (支持梁振英政府). In the wake of these marches, Ko would go on to form "Voice of Loving Hong Kong," becoming its convener.

Although an erstwhile member of the New People's Party, Ko has been accused of only joining the party to curry favour and has yet to attend a party conference. The New People's Party has distanced itself from "Voice of Loving Hong Kong", stating that there is no relation between the two groups and that the two do not co-operate.

Ko was a director of the "Shenzhen overseas liaison committee" (深圳市海外聯誼會), an affiliate of the United Front Work Department, however Ko has not been in communication with this group for some time.

On October 6, during the 2014 Hong Kong protests, Ko said that it was "forgivable" for triads to attack protesters in Mongkok, because the occupation is interfering with the triad members' attempts to make a living, going on to repeatedly chant that "The greatest crime is to interfere with people's livelihoods".

Patrick Ko was a long-time friend of Dickson Cheung (張漢賢), convener of "Hongkongese Priority" (香港人優先); however the two have fallen out over a difference in opinion in business matters.

== See also ==
- Alliance for Peace and Democracy (Hong Kong)
