= Silent Majority for Hong Kong =

Silent Majority for Hong Kong 幫港出聲
- Convenor: Robert Chow
- Founded: 8 August 2013
- Ideology: Chinese nationalism Chinese conservatism Anti–Occupy Central
- Political position: Right-wing to far-right
- National affiliation: Pro-Beijing camp
- Colours: Black
- Slogan: "Democracy without Chaos"

Website
- www.silentmajority.hk

Silent Majority for Hong Kong
- Traditional Chinese: 幫港出聲
- Simplified Chinese: 帮港出声
Transcriptions
Standard Mandarin
- Hanyu Pinyin: Bāng Gǎng Chūshēng
Yue: Cantonese
- Jyutping: bong1 gong2 ceot1 seng1

The Silent Majority for Hong Kong (Chinese: 幫港出聲; lit. 'Help Hong Kong to speak out') is an anti-Occupy Central, pro-Beijing political group in Hong Kong. It was founded on 8 August 2013 by members of the pro-Beijing alliance including former RTHK radio host Robert Chow and Professor of Economics at Lingnan University Ho Lok-sang.

The group, which opposed the Occupy Central with Love and Peace movement, released a video on YouTube predicting deaths and chaos if the Occupy Central protests were to proceed, and organised numerous activities opposing the Occupy Central movement under the name Alliance for Peace and Democracy, such as a signature campaign and a march.

== Objectives ==
The Group claims to strive for "democracy without chaos", and to support peace and the implementation of universal suffrage in Hong Kong, but to oppose violence and the Occupy Central Movement. It also supports the 2014 Hong Kong electoral reform consultation, but support the reform proposal to exclude the pan-democracy camp to join the race.

== Connection with Chinese government ==
Chow is quoted as saying "China will not deal with people ... it will only deal with [political] parties". Chow's statement that political parties supporting the occupy movement risked "fading into political obscurity" led some media and individuals, especially from the pro-democracy camp, to denounce the group as pro-establishment Hong Kong "mouthpiece" for the Chinese Communist Party. As a result of its alleged close connection with the Chinese government, the group has been called by the pro-democracy camp as "Help the [Chinese Communist] Party to speak out" (Chinese: 幫黨出聲).

== YouTube video ==
On 17 June 2014, the group posted a video on YouTube entitled "They can kill the city!", depicting possible repercussions of the Occupy Central movement. The video shows total chaos in Hong Kong should an occupation of Central take place, such as territory-wide traffic jams, automatic weapons and people dying of strokes. Members of the pro-democracy camp and supporters of the Occupy Central movement criticised the group's use of fearmongering tactics and exaggeration in an attempt to scare Hong Kong people from participating in the civil disobedience movement.
