= Robert Chow =

Hong Kong jouranlist and politician (born 1950)

Robert Chow Yung BBS
- 周融
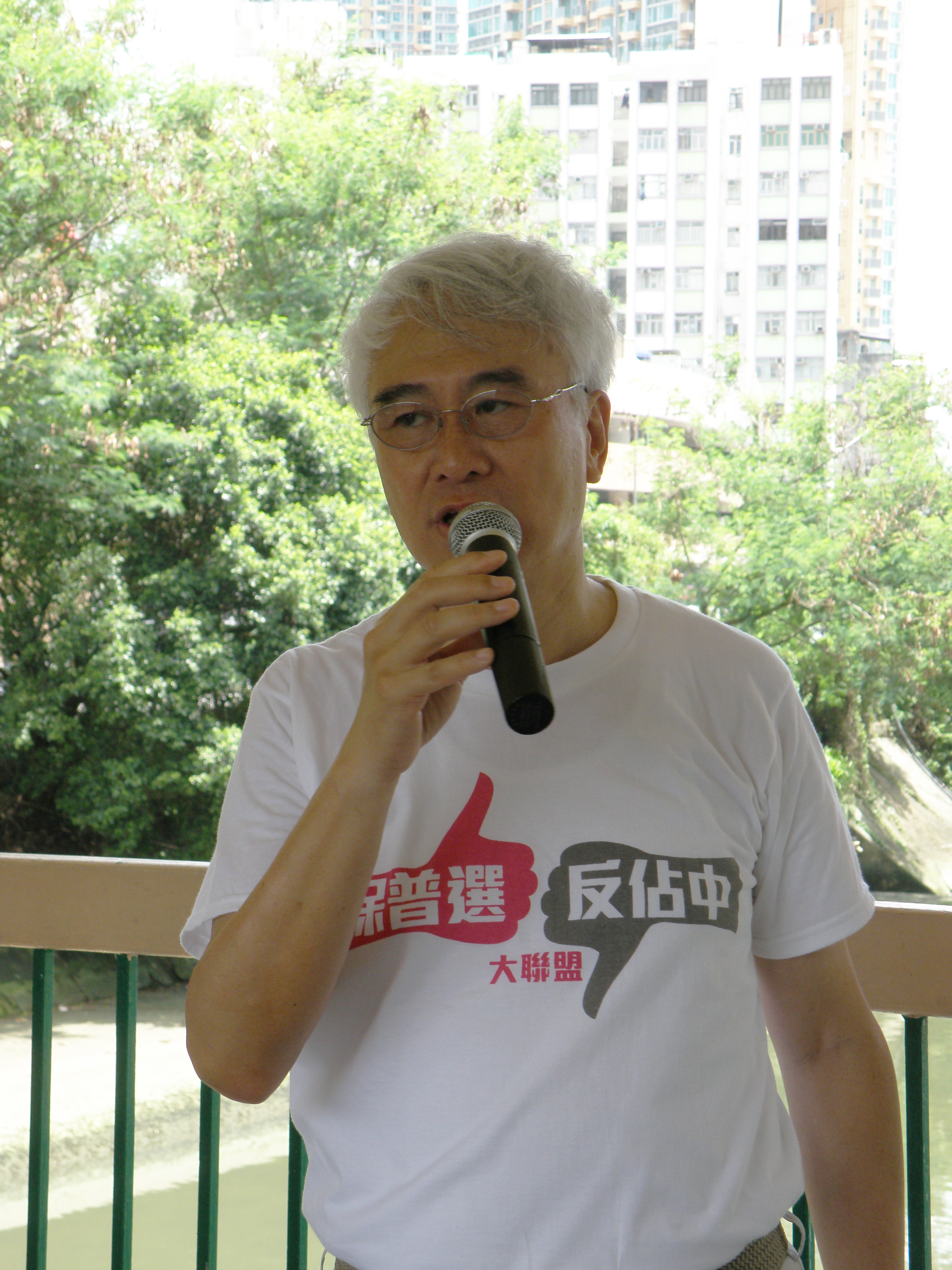
- Robert Chow at the Anti-"Occupy Central" Signature Campaign, 20 July 2014

Convenor of Silent Majority for Hong Kong
- Incumbent
- Assumed office 8 August 2014
- Preceded by: Office established

Personal details
- Born: 22 April 1950 (age 76) Hong Kong
- Party: Silent Majority for Hong Kong; Alliance for Peace and Democracy
- Children: Vanessa Chow, and three others
- Website: chowyung.com

Robert Chow
- Traditional Chinese: 周融
- Simplified Chinese: 周融
Transcriptions
Standard Mandarin
- Hanyu Pinyin: Zhōu róng
Yue: Cantonese
- IPA: yue

Robert Chow Yung (Chinese: 周融; Sidney Lau: Jau^{1} Yung^{4}; born 22 April 1950) BBS is a Hong Kong journalist and media personality who is a former RTHK radio host. He is currently the spokesman of the pro-Beijing conservative Alliance for Peace and Democracy and founder and leader of the Beijing-approved Silent Majority for Hong Kong movement.

== Early life ==
Chow studied up to the Form Five level of school education.

In 1967, at the age of 17, Chow started his career as a reporter for the now-defunct local tabloid The Star where his senior colleague Kevin Sinclair described him as a "mere boy". In 1970, he was made a news editor at The Star.

== Media and communications career ==
In 1974, Chow started working in the Independent Commission Against Corruption, and became chief information officer in 1980.

In 1985, he became the editor-in-chief of The Standard, and worked there until the 1990s.

Chow began to attract attention from the Hong Kong media when he was appointed as a programme-host in RTHK in 1999, and was awarded the Bronze Bauhinia Star by the Hong Kong Government in 2006 for his contributions to public and community service, especially in the media sector. He was asked to leave RTHK in 2011 together with Ng Chi Sum, another media personality.

== Silent Majority for Hong Kong ==
In August 2013, Chow founded the Silent Majority for Hong Kong organisation as a focus of opposition to the Occupy Central democratic movement and is the organisation's leader.

=== The Anti-Occupy Central Parade ===
In July 2014, Chow, as the Spokesperson of the Alliance for Peace and Democracy, was accused of offering people free meals and other treats in an attempt to boost the turnout of the Anti-Occupy Central Parade. "We want to tell the world that there is another voice in Hong Kong, other than just that of the Occupy Central protesters," Chow said. "Some people may not like the government policies … but most still want peace and harmony. They don't want to see violence, chaos and turmoil." He also maintained that it was acceptable to distribute lunch boxes to groups joining the parade as a token of gratitude.

=== British right of abode ===
In 2014, Chow was found to be in possession of right of abode in the United Kingdom, though he held no British passport. Some considered this in conflict with his frequent claims of being a patriotic Chinese citizen. He initially stated that it was not possible to voluntarily renounce the right of abode, acquired in the 1990s as part of the British Nationality Selection Scheme, but later backtracked, saying that he was working with a lawyer to abandon it.

=== "White terror" tactics ===
In September 2014, Chow announced that his organisation had set up a telephone hotline for informants to report the names of schools permitting students to be absent from class during the Occupy Central protests. It was widely condemned by the public of Hong Kong and portrayed as white terror, a persecution tactic similar to those employed by the Kuomintang in Taiwan, including asking people to betray their close friends or family members.
