= Lau Siu-kai =

Sociologist

The Honourable Prof. Siu-kai Lau GBM, GBS
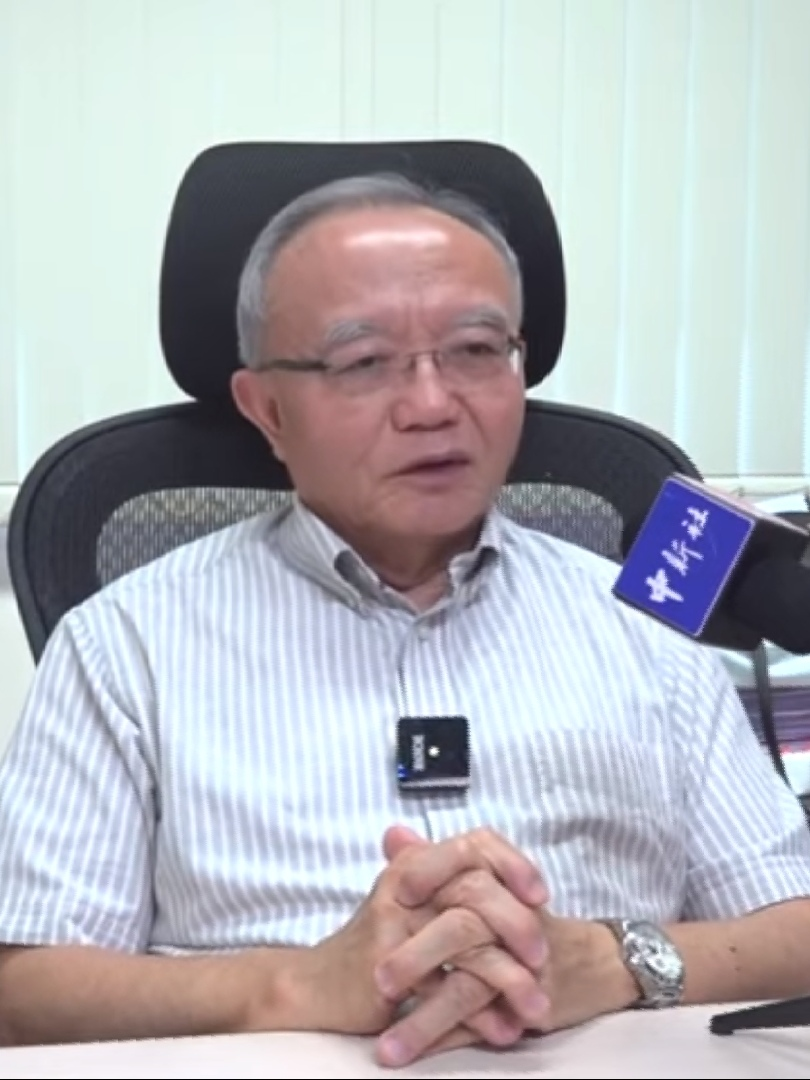
- Born: 7 June 1947 (age 79)
- Education: St. Paul's College; University of Hong Kong; University of Minnesota
- Occupation: Emeritus Professor of Sociology at the Chinese University of Hong Kong

Lau Siu-kai
- Traditional Chinese: 劉兆佳
- Simplified Chinese: 刘兆佳
Transcriptions
Standard Mandarin
- Hanyu Pinyin: Liú Zhaòjiā
Yue: Cantonese
- Jyutping: lau^{4} siu^{6}-gaai^{1}

Lau Siukai (Chinese: 劉兆佳) (born 1947), GBM, GBS, is a sociologist from Hong Kong.

== Biography ==
He graduated from the University of Hong Kong, and taught at the Department of Sociology of the Chinese University of Hong Kong, where he is emeritus professor of sociology, after earning a PhD degree from the University of Minnesota. During his tenure at CUHK he was also associate director of the university's Hong Kong Institute of Asia-Pacific Studies. He is also a former vice president of the Chinese Association of Hong Kong and Macao Studies, Beijing's top think tank on Hong Kong affairs, and continues to hold a consultant role in that organization as of November 2023.

He was head of the government's think tank, the Central Policy Unit, for a decade from 2002. In this role, he famously under-predicted attendance on the 1 July 2003 protest march at '30,000', when in fact more than 500,000 joined to reject the planned introduction of legislation to enact Article 23 of the Basic Law, along with other grievances, ultimately leading to the resignation of Chief Executive Tung Chee Hwa.

Lau was appointed delegate to the Chinese People's Political Consultative Conference in 2003 and is vocal in his support for watering down democratic development in Hong Kong by, for example, restricting the scope for nomination of candidates for the election of Chief Executive of the Hong Kong SAR in 2017, and for greater integration of Hong Kong into China's economic planning.

In January 2021, Lau said that only "patriots who love Hong Kong" and are supportive of the government should be able to run in elections. In February 2021, he said that the Legislative Council at the time did not have enough members to approve changes to electoral laws, and predicted Beijing would step in to pass changes to the electoral system.

Order of precedence
Preceded by Martin Liao; Recipients of the Grand Bauhinia Medal	Hong Kong order of precedence Recipients of the Grand Bauhinia Medal	Succeeded by Lee Chack-fan; Recipients of the Grand Bauhinia Medal
