= Pro-Beijing camp (Hong Kong) =

Political alignment in Hong Kong

Pro-Beijing camp 建制派
- Flags of the People's Republic of China and the Chinese Communist Party
- LegCo Convenor: Martin Liao
- Ideology: Chinese nationalism Conservatism (HK); Factions: Socialism (HK); Economic liberalism
- Colours: Red and blue (customary)
- Legislative Council: 89 / 90 (99%)
- District Councils: 470 / 470 (100%)
- Election Committee: 1,465 / 1,500 (98%)
- NPC (HK deputies): 36 / 36 (100%)
- CPPCC (HK members): 124 / 124 (100%)

Pro-Beijing camp
- Traditional Chinese: 親北京陣營
- Simplified Chinese: 亲北京阵营
Transcriptions
Standard Mandarin
- Hanyu Pinyin: Qīn Běijīng Zhènyíng
- Bopomofo: ㄑㄧㄣ ㄅㄟˇ ㄐㄧㄥ ㄓㄣˋ ㄧㄥˊ
- Wade–Giles: Ch'in^{1} Pei^{3}-ching^{1} Chen^{4}-ying^{2}
- IPA: [tɕʰín pèɪ.tɕíŋ ʈʂə̂n.ǐŋ]
Yue: Cantonese
- Yale Romanization: Chān bāk gīng jahn yìhng
- Jyutping: Can1 bak1 ging1 zan6 jing4
- IPA: [tsʰɐn˥ pɐk̚˥ kɪŋ˥ tsɐn˨ jɪŋ˩]

Pro-establishment camp
- Chinese: 建制派
Transcriptions
Standard Mandarin
- Hanyu Pinyin: Jiànzhìpài
- Bopomofo: ㄐㄧㄢˋ ㄓˋ ㄆㄞˋ
- Wade–Giles: Chien^{4}-chih^{4}-p'ai^{4}
- IPA: [tɕjɛ̂n.ʈʂɻ̩̂.pʰâɪ]
Yue: Cantonese
- Yale Romanization: Gin jai paai
- Jyutping: Gin3 zai3 paai3
- IPA: [kin˧ tsɐj˧ pʰaj˧]

Pro-China camp
- Traditional Chinese: 親中派
- Simplified Chinese: 亲中派
Transcriptions
Standard Mandarin
- Hanyu Pinyin: Qīnzhōngpài
- Bopomofo: ㄑㄧㄣ ㄓㄨㄥ ㄆㄞˋ
- Wade–Giles: Ch'in^{1}-chung^{1}-p'ai^{4}
- IPA: [tɕʰín.ʈʂʊ́ŋ.pʰâɪ]
Yue: Cantonese
- Yale Romanization: Chān jūng paai
- Jyutping: Can1 zung1 paai3
- IPA: [tsʰɐn˥ tsʊŋ˥ pʰaj˧]

The pro-Beijing camp, pro-establishment camp (Chinese: 建制派) or pro-China camp is a political alignment in Hong Kong which generally supports the policies of the Beijing central government and the Chinese Communist Party (CCP) towards Hong Kong. The term "pro-establishment camp" is regularly in use to label the broader segment of the Hong Kong political arena which has the closer relationship with the establishment, namely the governments of the People's Republic of China (PRC) and the Hong Kong Special Administrative Region (HKSAR). Pro-Beijing politicians are labeled "patriots" by pro-Beijing media and "loyalists" by the rival pro-democracy camp.

The pro-Beijing camp evolved from Hong Kong's pro-CCP faction, often called "Leftists", which acted under the direction of the CCP. It launched the 1967 Hong Kong riots against British colonial rule in Hong Kong and had a long rivalry with the pro-Kuomintang bloc. After the Sino-British Joint Declaration was signed in 1984, affirming Chinese sovereignty over Hong Kong from 1997, the traditional leftists realigned themselves and unofficially formed a loose "United Front" with the conservative pro-business elites to counter the emergence of the pro-democracy camp in the 1990s and ensure a smooth transition of the Hong Kong sovereignty in Beijing's interest.

Since the handover in 1997, the pro-Beijing camp has become the major supporting force of the Hong Kong government and maintained control of the Legislative Council of Hong Kong (LegCo), having the advantage of indirectly elected functional constituencies. Going into the 2010s, the pro-Beijing camp underwent a period of diversification in which different parties emerged and targeted different voters which resulted in steady increases of support. With various positions on specific issues, the camp generally embraces conservative values politically and Chinese nationalistic and patriotic sentiments. However, the unpopular SAR administrations and opposition to Beijing's policies toward Hong Kong have also caused the camp major losses in the 2003 and 2019 elections. Following the imposition of the 2020 Hong Kong national security law, the pro-democracy camp lost all of its political representation in the LegCo and district councils, leading to the complete domination of the political scene by the pro-Beijing camp.

== Names ==
The faction in the pro-Beijing camp which evolved from the "traditional leftists" was also known as the "pro-communists" (親共人士), while the business elites and professionals who were appointed by the colonial government before 1997 were called the "pro-government camp". In the 1990s when the traditional leftists and business elites unofficially formed the loose "United Front" towards the handover in 1997, "pro-Beijing camp" has become a broader term for the whole segment. The term "pro-government camp" has also been used to describe the same segment which support the SAR government. During the unpopular administration of Chief Executive Tung Chee-hwa, the hardcore pro-government parties, mainly the Democratic Alliance for the Betterment of Hong Kong (DAB), were labelled "loyalists" by the pro-democracy camp. In recent years, a more neutral term "pro-establishment camp" is regularly in use, especially in Chinese media.

== Ideology ==
Amongst pragmatists, especially among the pro-business elites and tycoons who have been absorbed into Beijing's "United Front", have enjoyed political power and privileges, as well as economic interests, from the present political system and their close ties with the Beijing authorities. Some moderates also hope that in conceding on those issues on which China will not compromise, preserving as much as possible in the way of personal liberties and local autonomy can be achieved.

The rhetoric of the pro-Beijing camp is mostly concerned with patriotism, social stability and economic prosperity. The pro-Beijing camp generally supports universal suffrage in Hong Kong under Beijing's framework, under which only Beijing-designated "patriots" may govern Hong Kong, although the most conservative faction opposes increased democratic development in Hong Kong with the introduction of universal suffrage and see in it the creation of instability.

== History ==
=== Pro-CCP leftists ===
The pro-Beijing camp evolved from the pro-CCP faction in Hong Kong which existed since the establishment of the CCP. The 1922 Seamen's strike, led by the Chinese Seamen's Union and the 1925–26 Canton–Hong Kong strike, led by various left-wing labour unions, were the two major Communist-related labour movements in the British colony of Hong Kong. During the Japanese occupation of Hong Kong, the Communist East River guerillas were active in the Pearl River Delta.

The Hong Kong and Kowloon Federation of Trade Unions (FTU), an umbrella trade union for the local left-wing unions, was founded in April 1948. After the Communist victory in the Chinese Civil War, the local communists (土共) remained in their semi-underground status. In the early post-war days, the Hong Kong and Kowloon Federation of Trade Unions, the Chinese General Chamber of Commerce and the Hong Kong Chinese Reform Association became the three pillars of the local pro-CCP organs, following the orders of the New China News Agency, the de facto Communist China's representative in Hong Kong. Their rivals were the pro-Nationalist faction, who pledged allegiance to the Nationalist government on Taiwan. The FTU took a leading role in the Hong Kong 1967 Leftist Riots, which, inspired by the Cultural Revolution in the Mainland, aimed at overthrowing the British colonial rule in Hong Kong. The leftists lost their prestige after the riots for a period of time as the general public was against the violence attributed to the leftists, although the presence of the pro-Beijing Maoist elements remained strong in the universities and colleges throughout the 1970s, in which many of the pro-CCP university and college graduates became the backbones of the pro-Beijing camp today.

=== Transition period ===
After the Sino-British Joint Declaration in 1984, the pro-CCP organisations became active again, of which many of them were appointed to various positions relating to the transition of the sovereignty of Hong Kong. The Beijing government also appointed many Hong Kong tycoons and professionals to sit on the Hong Kong Basic Law Consultative Committee (BLCC) and the Hong Kong Basic Law Drafting Committee (BLDC) as the means of forming a united front. To ensure the post-1997 political system would be dominated by business and professional interests, the Business and Professional Group of the Basic Law Consultative Committee was formed in April 1986 to propose a conservative, less democratic proposal of Group of 89 for electing the Chief Executive and Legislative Council, in contrast to the more progressive proposal of the pro-democracy activists. Several new political parties, including the New Hong Kong Alliance (NHKA) founded in 1989 by Lo Tak-shing from the conservative wing and the Business and Professionals Federation of Hong Kong (BPF) founded in 1990 by Vincent Lo from the mainstream wing, evolved from the group. The Liberal Democratic Federation of Hong Kong (LDF) consisted of the pro-government elected officeholders in which Maria Tam was the key person was also formed in 1990 in preparation for the first direct elections to the Legislative Council in 1991.

The Tiananmen Square protests of 1989 sparked pro-democracy sentiments in Hong Kong. The newly formed democratic party, the United Democrats of Hong Kong, enjoyed landslide victories in the District Boards election, Urban and Regional Council election and Legislative Council election in 1991. To counter the pro-democracy influence in the legislature, the British-appointed unofficial members of the Legislative Council launched the Co-operative Resources Centre (CRC) in 1991 which transformed into the pro-business conservative Liberal Party in 1993, becoming the arch rival of the United Democrats. In 1992, the traditional leftists also formed the Democratic Alliance for the Betterment of Hong Kong (DAB) under the direction of the Hong Kong and Macau Affairs Office. In 1994, a group of businessmen and professionals founded the Hong Kong Progressive Alliance (HKPA) under the direction of the New China News Agency.

The large-scale democratisation initiated by then Governor Chris Patten resulted in the deterioration of Sino-British relations and led to the emergence of an "unholy alliance" of pro-Beijing businesspeople and leftist loyalists versus the pro-democratic popular alliance. The Liberal Party led by Allen Lee launched a campaign attempting to defeat Patten's proposal which was backed by Beijing despite its eventual failure. Despite this, in the broadened franchise, the pro-Beijing camp was again defeated by the pro-democracy camp in the 1995 Legislative Council election. The Beijing government argued that the electoral reform introduced by Patten had violated the Joint Declaration, and thus they would scrap the reforms upon resumption of sovereignty. In preparation, a parallel legislature, the Provisional Legislative Council, was set up in 1996 under the control of pro-Beijing camp, and it introduced as the Legislative Council upon the founding of the new SAR government in 1997.

=== Early post-handover years ===
Since 1997, the pro-Beijing camp has never lost a majority in LegCo, controlling LegCo through a collaboration of the pro-Beijing groups with their support within the functional constituencies. In 2002, Chief Executive Tung Chee-hwa formed a governing alliance with the DAB and Liberal Party, the two largest pro-Beijing parties in the legislature, by inviting the two chairmen, Jasper Tsang and James Tien, to the Executive Council. On 1 July 2003, a peaceful crowd of more than 500,000 protested against the introduction of controversial legislation under Article 23 of the Basic Law. James Tien, chairman of the Liberal Party and member of the Executive Council, forced the government to delay the second reading of the bill. The stance of the DAB on Article 23 and their blind support for the Tung Chee-hwa's administration were strongly criticised and led to their losses in the District Council election.

In 2005, veteran civil servant Donald Tsang succeeded the unpopular Tung Chee-hwa stepped down as Chief Executive in Beijing's direction. The pro-government camp supported the Tsang government, even though some traditional leftists questioned Tsang's background in the colonial civil service. After the setbacks in 2003, the pro-Beijing camp won back seats lost in 2003 in the 2007 District Council election, in which the DAB became the largest victor. The DAB enjoyed another victory in 2011 District Council election. In the Hong Kong legislative election, 2012, the pro-Beijing camp won more than half of the geographical constituency seats respectively in Hong Kong Island, Kowloon West and New Territories West, narrowing the number of seats held in the geographical constituencies between pro-Beijing and pro-democrats to 17 seats and 18 seats respectively. The pro-Beijing camp retained control of the Legislative Council and the DAB remained the largest party with 13 seats in total.

Since the late 2000s, the pro-Beijing camp has expanded its spectrum of support from pro-business elites and traditional leftists to those from a broader background. The former Secretary for Security Regina Ip, who was in charge of introducing the Basic Law Article 23 stood in the Hong Kong Island by-election in 2007 against the former Chief Secretary Anson Chan supported by the pro-democrats. Despite her defeat, she was able to be elected in the 2008 Legislative Council election, and formed the middle class and professional oriented New People's Party in 2011. Some pro-Beijing legal professionals who ran as independents, such as Priscilla Leung, Paul Tse and Junius Ho were elected to the Legislative Council in recent elections, which were seen receiving support from the Liaison Office, which was viewed growing influence in Hong Kong's domestic affairs. On the other hand, the FTU, which operated as the sister organisation of the DAB, began to run under its own banner, taking a more pro-labour and pro-grassroots stance as compared to the DAB's big-tent position.

=== 2012 Chief Executive election and aftermath ===
Two pro-Beijing candidates ran for the Chief Executive election in 2012, with the Chief Secretary Henry Tang and the Convenor of the Executive Council, Leung Chun-ying using scandals, dirty tactics and smears on each other. With fierce competition deeply dividing the pro-Beijing camp into the Tang camp and the Leung camp, Leung eventually won the election with the support of the Liaison Office. After the election, Beijing called for a reconciliation of the two camps.

In late 2012, some pro-Leung advocacy groups with the allegations of Beijing's financial supports began to emerge such as Voice of Loving Hong Kong, Caring Hong Kong Power and Hong Kong Youth Care Association, which launched counter-protests against the pan-democrats. The Leung Chun-ying administration with its hardline stance on the growing movement for Hong Kong independence after the 2014 Umbrella Revolution was strongly criticised by the pro-democrats and some pro-Beijing moderates. James Tien, a keen supporter of Henry Tang in 2012 became a leading critic of Leung. He was stripped from his Chinese People's Political Consultative Conference (CPPCC) office during the 2014 protests after he asked Leung to step down. In the 2015 District Council and 2016 Legislative Council elections, the pro-democrats and localists scored better-than expected victories over the pro-Beijing camp. In December 2016, Leung Chun-ying announced he would not seek re-election.

The two top officials, Chief Secretary for Administration Carrie Lam and Financial Secretary John Tsang emerged as front runners in the 2017 Chief Executive election after Leung's announcement. Both resigned from their posts; while Lam's resignation was approved by the central government within days, Tsang's resignation was delayed for a month, which sparked the speculation that Tsang was not Beijing's favoured candidate. With the active lobbying by the Liaison Office, Lam received 580 nominations from the 1,194-member Election Committee, while Tsang struggled to get enough nominations from the pro-Beijing electors and had to rely on the pro-democracy camp. Lam went on to win the election with 777 votes, beating Tsang's 365 votes and retired judge Woo Kwok-hing's 21 votes.

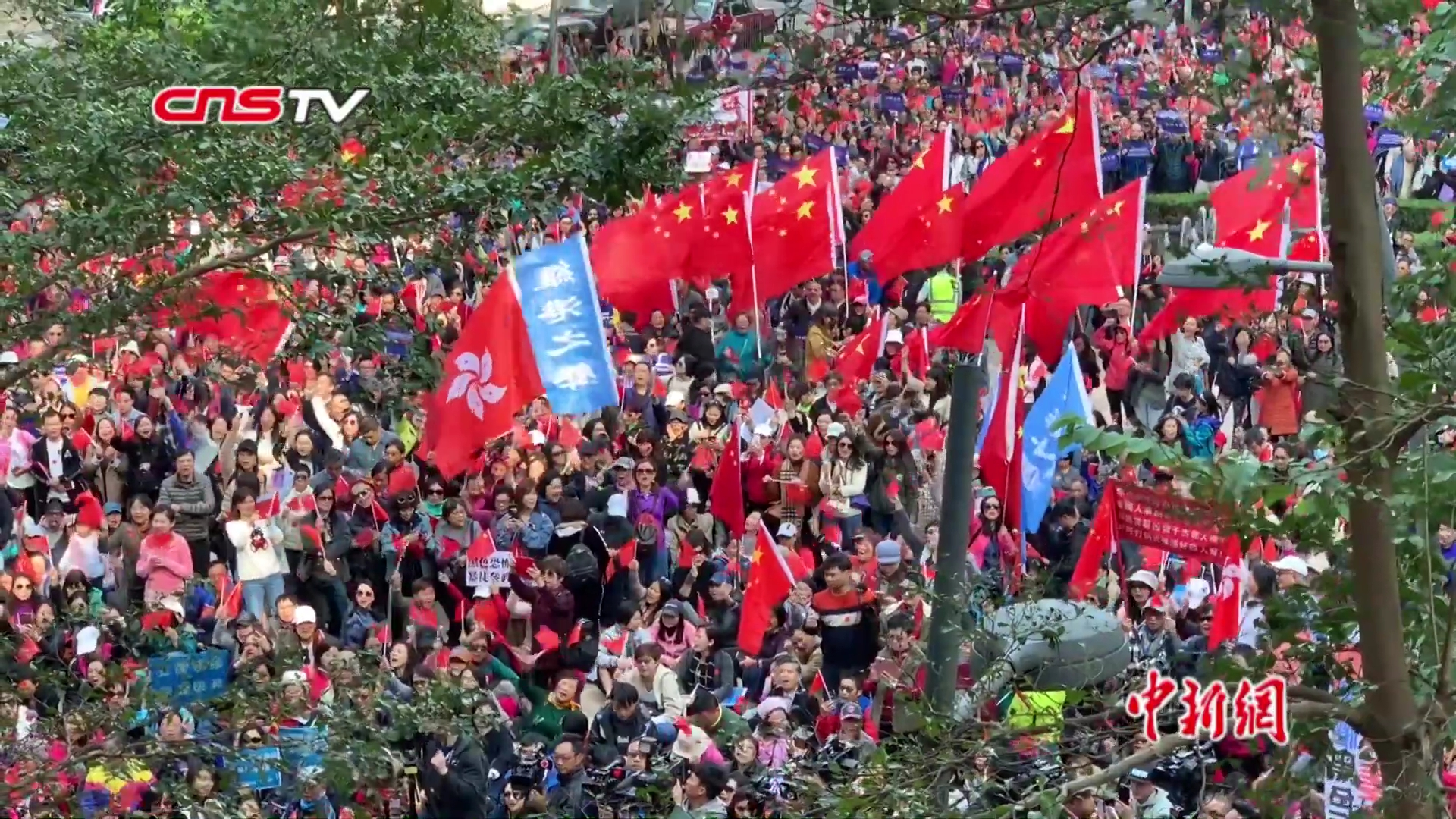
Pro-China rally during 2019–2020 Hong Kong protests

The pro-Beijing camp formed a united front in the 2018 Legislative Council by-election. It took two of the four vacancies left by the 2016 Legislative Council oath-taking controversy, by taking the Kowloon West geographical constituency and Architectural, Surveying, Planning and Landscape functional constituency from the pro-democrats and localists. Vincent Cheng of the DAB narrowly defeated Yiu Chung-yim who was disqualified from the Legislative Council in the oath-taking controversy, becoming the first pro-Beijing candidate to win in a single-member district election since the handover.

== Convenor ==
Convenor of the pro-Beijing camp is also known as the "class monitor" by the local media. The convenor usually speaks on behalf of the camp, co-ordinates the camp on communication and voting (similar to whipping), and draws up the duty roster to avoid quorum not met.

- 7th Legislative Council: Martin Liao
- 6th Legislative Council: Martin Liao
- 5th Legislative Council: Ip Kwok-him (gave up power after chaotic voting on electoral reform)
- 5th Legislative Council and before: Tam Yiu-chung

== Political parties ==
FTU
FEW
FLU	PHKS (Merged into LDF)	G89 (Split into BPF, NHKA and LDF)
FSHK (Merged into HKPA)	LDF (Merged into HKPA)	NHKA (Merged into HKPA)	BPF	CRC (Succeeded by Liberal)	Breakfast (Merged into BPA)
DAB	Liberal
HKPA (Merged into DAB)
NCF
Alliance (Merged into BPA)
ES (Merged into BPA)	PF (Merged into BPA)	KWND
NPP	PP
BPA
Roundtable	NPHK
Pro-labour	Pro-labour	Pro-labour	Pro-middle-class	Pro-middle-class	Pro-middle-class	Pro-business	Pro-business	Pro-business	District-based	District-based	New HKers

- The Democratic Alliance for the Betterment and Progress of Hong Kong (DAB) is the largest pro-Beijing party founded by a group of traditional leftists in 1992 with sustainable grassroots support. However, it has gradually leaned to a more pro-middle-class position since its merger with the pro-business Hong Kong Progressive Alliance (HKPA) in 2005 and more young professionals take place in the party leadership.
- Hong Kong Federation of Trade Unions (FTU) is the traditional leftist labour union which co-founded the DAB in 1992. It positions itself with a pro-labour and patriotic agenda and has been separated from the DAB and actively participated in elections under its own banner in recent years.
- Business and Professionals Alliance for Hong Kong (BPA) is the leading party for the pro-business sector in the Legislative Council. Formed by Economic Synergy, a breakaway group from the Liberal Party, and Professional Forum, a parliamentary group with functional constituency legislators, it was established in 2012 and has become the second-largest force in the legislature.
- New People's Party (NPP) is a party founded by Regina Ip who caters at middle class and civil servant interests.
- Liberal Party is the pro-business party formed in 1993 by a group of legislators who had been appointed by the British Governor and functional constituency members. It has a large support from the business sector and adopts an economic liberal and liberal conservative ideology.
- Hong Kong Federation of Education Workers (FEW) is a teachers union established in 1975. It is currently the largest teachers union in Hong Kong. Its aim is to "rally teachers to adopt the position of 'loving Hong Kong and the Motherland'", as part of China's united front work in Hong Kong's educational sector.
- Federation of Hong Kong and Kowloon Labour Unions (FLU) is a labour union which has a seat in the legislature through the Labour functional constituency.
- Roundtable is a political organisation founded in 2017 by Michael Tien after he quit the New People's Party. The organization was founded after Tien complained that the New People's Party was becoming too close to Beijing.
- Professional Power (PP) is a political group based in Sai Kung District, Hong Kong. The group is formed and led by Christine Fong, a former member of the Liberal Party. The group markets itself as nonpartisan.
- Kowloon West New Dynamic (KWND) is a district-based political group in Hong Kong. It was founded by a group of local politicians in the western part of Kowloon on 16 March 2008. The main focus of party is to improve quality of life in the districts within the area
- New Prospect for Hong Kong (NPHK) is a political group established in October 2019 consisting mainly of mainland Chinese living in Hong Kong, dubbed "gang piao" in Mandarin.
- New Century Forum (NCF) is a political group and think tank founded in 1999 which dedicates to middle class interests. The only representative of the group in the Legislative Council is convenor Ma Fung-kwok.
- Civil Force and New People's Party–Civil Force.

== Alleged Triad involvement ==
During the 2012 Chief Executive election campaign, Leung's campaign officers were seen attending a dinner in Lau Fau Shan with Kwok Wing-hung, nicknamed “Shanghai Boy”, an alleged former leader of the local triad Wo Shing Wo. The content of the meeting remained unknown to the public.

During the 2014 Hong Kong protests, the armed anti-Occupy protesters beat up Occupy protesters in the Mong Kok occupation site. The student protesters accused the government and the police of allowing gangs to attack them as there was no uniformed police in the scene during the event. Democratic Party legislator James To also accused that "the [Hong Kong] government has used organised, orchestrated forces and even triad gangs in [an] attempt to disperse citizens."

During the 2019 Hong Kong protests, a mob of over 100 armed men dressed in white indiscriminately attacked civilians on the streets and passengers in the Yuen Long MTR station on 21 July including the elderly, children, black-clad protesters, journalists and lawmakers. At least 45 people were injured in the incident, including a pregnant woman. Pro-Beijing legislator Junius Ho was seen in various videos posted online greeting the white-clothed group of assailants, shaking their hands and calling the suspected gangsters "heroes", giving them thumbs-up and saying to them "thank you for your hard work." At least one of the white-clothed men who shook hands with Ho has been shown to have been inside Yuen Long Station during the attacks.

== Electoral performance ==
=== Chief Executive elections ===
Election	1st Candidate	Party	Votes	%	2nd Candidate	Party	Votes	%	3rd Candidate	Party	Votes	%
1996	Tung Chee-hwa	Nonpartisan	320	80.40	Yang Ti-liang	Nonpartisan	42	10.55	Peter Woo	Nonpartisan	36	9.05
2002	Tung Chee-hwa	Nonpartisan	Uncontested									
2005	Donald Tsang	Nonpartisan	Uncontested									
2007	Donald Tsang	Nonpartisan	649	84.07	Alan Leong	Civic	123	15.93				
2012	Leung Chun-ying	Nonpartisan	689	66.81	Henry Tang	Nonpartisan	285	27.14	Albert Ho	Democratic	76	7.24
2017	Carrie Lam	Nonpartisan	777	65.62	John Tsang	Nonpartisan	365	31.38	Woo Kwok-hing	Nonpartisan	21	1.81
2022	John Lee	Nonpartisan	1,416	99.44								

=== Legislative Council elections ===
Election	Number of popular votes	% of popular votes	GC seats	FC seats	EC seats	Total seats	+/−	Status
1998	449,668	30.38	5	25	10	40 / 60	—N/a	Majority
2000	461,048▲	34.94▲	8	25	6	39 / 60	0	Majority
2004	661,972▲	37.40▲	12	23		35 / 60	4▼	Majority
2008	602,468▼	39.75▲	11	26		37 / 60	3▲	Majority
2012	772,487▲	42.66▲	17	26		43 / 70	6▲	Majority
2016	871,016▲	40.17▼	16	24		40 / 70	3▼	Majority
2021	1,232,555▲	93.15▲	20	29	40	89 / 90	49▲	Majority
2025	1,276,533▲	100.00▲	20	30	40	90 / 90	1▲	Majority

=== District Council elections ===
Election	Number of popular votes	% of popular votes	Total elected seats	+/-
1999	443,441	54.69	232 / 390	22▲
2003	489,889▲	46.48▼	201 / 400	28▼
2007	614,621▲	53.98▲	273 / 405	61▲
2011	654,368▲	55.42▲	301 / 412	23▲
2015	788,389▲	54.61▼	298 / 431	6▼
2019	1,233,030▲	42.06▼	62 / 452	242▼
2023	1,169,030▼	99.82▲	470 / 470	408▲

== See also ==
- United Front in Hong Kong
- Conservatism in Hong Kong
- Socialism in Hong Kong
- Triad (organized crime)
- Liaison Office (Hong Kong)
- Centrist camp (Hong Kong)
- Pro-Beijing camp (Macau)
