= The Impossible City =

2022 book by Karen Cheung

- First edition
- Author: Karen Cheung
- Language: English
- Genre: Memoir
- Publisher: Random House
- Publication date: 2022

The Impossible City: A Hong Kong Memoir is a 2022 memoir by Karen Cheung, published by Random House.

The book documents her growing up in Hong Kong and her familial relationships, as well the beginning of her interest in politics during the Umbrella Movement and scenes of counterculture.

== Contents ==
The book's narrative begins in 1997, when Hong Kong has its sovereignty transferred to China during the Handover of Hong Kong. At the time Cheung was age four; she was born in Shenzhen but went back to Hong Kong shortly afterward. She attended first an international school and then a government-funded school after her family's financial situation deteriorated.

The narrative ends when the Hong Kong National Security Law is imposed on 1 July 2020.

== Reception ==
Kirkus Reviews described it as "A powerful memoir of love and anguish".

Publishers Weekly stated that the strongest sections were the "personal missives about city life" and that the work is "a riveting portrait of a place that’s as captivating as it is confounding."

The book was longlisted for the 2023 Andrew Carnegie Medal for Excellence in Nonfiction.
