= Y. C. Tang Disciplinary Development Fund =

The Y. C. Tang Disciplinary Development Fund (simplified Chinese: 汤永谦学科建设发展基金; traditional Chinese: 湯永謙學科建設發展基金) is an educational foundation of Zhejiang University (ZJU).

== Introduction ==
The fund was founded by American engineer and entrepreneur Dr. Y.C. Tang (湯永謙, a Zhejiang University alumnus and Zhejiang native (hometown Ningbo).

The first endowment of the fund was US $2 million from Mr. and Mrs Tang in May 2004. The General Secretary of Zhejiang University - Zhang Junsheng, received the endowment, on behalf of the university. Before this donation, Tang couple already donated 40 million Chinese Yuan to the university.

The fund is coupled with the Y.C. Tang Educational Fund, which is based in United States. Annually, Y.C.Tang donates about 200,000 US dollars to support the educational activities at Zhejiang University.

In 1997, the Centennial Anniversary of ZJU, Mr. Tang also donated 2.4 million USD to build a student center at Yuquan Campus. He further donated 5 million USD to Zhejiang University, to support its constructions and education.
