= Benny Tai =

Hong Kong legal scholar and activist (born 1964)

- 戴耀廷
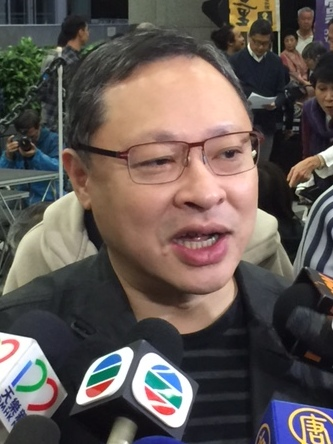
- Tai in 2018
- Born: Benny Tai Yiu-ting; 12 July 1964 (age 62); British Hong Kong
- Known for: Co-founding Occupy Central with Love and Peace

Academic background
- Education: University of Hong Kong (LLB, PCLL); London School of Economics (LLM)

Academic work
- Institutions: University of Hong Kong (1990–2020)
- Main interests: Law and religion; Constitutional law; Political law

Signature
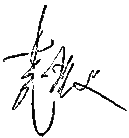

Benny Tai
- Traditional Chinese: 戴耀廷
- Simplified Chinese: 戴耀廷
Transcriptions
Standard Mandarin
- Hanyu Pinyin: Dài Yàotíng
Yue: Cantonese
- Jyutping: daai3 jiu6 ting4

Benny Tai Yiu-ting (Chinese: 戴耀廷; born 12 July 1964) is a Hong Kong legal scholar, political figure, and democracy activist. He was an associate professor of law at the University of Hong Kong.

From 2013, Tai launched and is known for his initiation of the Occupy Central with Love and Peace, as he considered Hong Kong to lack "true universal suffrage" and should participate in an Occupy movement to win universal suffrage in the 2017 Hong Kong Chief Executive election. His suggestion ultimately resulted in the eruption of the Umbrella Movement the following year, as a result of which he was found guilty of "conspiracy to commit public nuisance" and "inciting others to commit public nuisance" and sentenced to six months in prison. Citing this conviction, in July 2020, the University of Hong Kong's governing council controversially fired Tai.

After the protests, Tai repeatedly campaigned to pressure for greater electoral reforms in Hong Kong, launching "Operation ThunderGo" in the 2016 Legislative Council election, a "smart voter" mechanism aiming at getting the most pro-democracy candidates elected to the Legislative Council. He also initiated "Project Storm" for the pro-democrats to win the majority in the 2019 District Council elections.

On 6 January 2021, Tai was arrested along with 54 other pro-democracy campaigners, activists, social workers, and former legislators on suspicion of "subversion of state power" under the national security law for organising the 2020 pro-democracy primaries. In a national security trial in 2024, a Hong Kong court sentenced Tai to 10 years in jail for subversion.

== Academic background ==
Tai was educated at the Diocesan Boys' School and then graduated from the University of Hong Kong with a law degree and a Postgraduate Certificate in Laws, followed by a Master of Laws from the London School of Economics. His classmates included Rimsky Yuen and Keith Yeung.

He joined the Faculty of Law of the University of Hong Kong in 1990, became an assistant professor in 1991 and an associate professor in 2001. He was also the Associate Dean of the law faculty from 2000 to 2008. He specialised in constitutional law, administrative law, law and governance, law and politics and law and religion.

Tai has been active in promoting civic education in the community, having served on the Hong Kong Basic Law Consultative Committee as a student representative from 1988 to 1990 and a member of the Committee on the Promotion of Civil Education and the Bilingual Laws Advisory Committee from 1995 to 2003. He was also a part-time member of the Hong Kong government's Central Policy Unit in 2007.

In July 2020, Tai was fired by the University of Hong Kong, his long-time employer, citing the criminal conviction he incurred for his role in the 2014 pro-democracy protests, known as Occupy Central. The university's governing council controversially overturned (by 18 votes to 2) a previous ruling by its senate, which recommended against dismissal. His salary and benefits were immediately suspended. Tai claimed that the decision to fire him was "made not by the University of Hong Kong but by an authority beyond the University through its agents."

== Occupy Central with Love and Peace ==
On 16 January 2013, Tai wrote an article entitled "Civil Disobedience's Deadliest Weapon" on Hong Kong Economic Journal which sparked public debate. In the article, Tai postulated a non-violent civil disobedience seven-step progression to pressure the Hong Kong government to implement genuine full democracy: 10,000 participants signing a declaration (taking a vow and pledge of willingness to occupy the streets), live TV broadcast of discussions, electronic voting on methods for universal suffrage, a referendum on the preferred formula, resignation of a "super-seat" Legislative Council member to be filled in a by-election to be seen as a referendum on the plan, civil disobedience, and, finally, Occupy Central in July 2014 if the plan was rejected by the Beijing government.

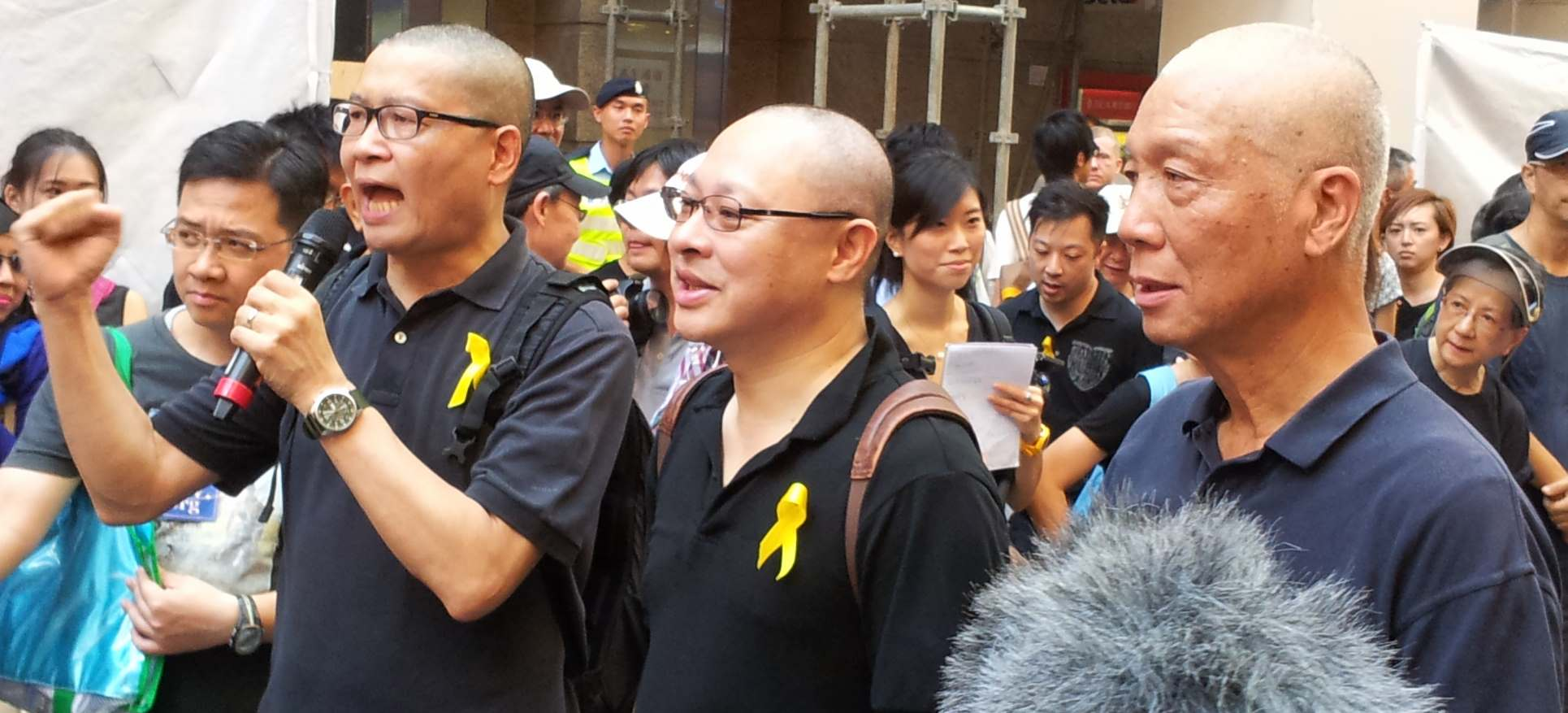
Chan Kin-man, Benny Tai and Chu Yiu-ming, lead first OCLP-linked march (Black Banner protest), 14 September 2014

He and sociology scholar Chan Kin-man and pro-democracy priest Reverend Chu Yiu-ming founded the Occupy Central with Love and Peace (OCLP) on 27 March 2013. The plan was supported by the pan-democracy camp and rounds of deliberations were held among the Occupy participants from 2013 to 2014 before an referendum on the electoral reform proposal in June 2014. The plan was strongly condemned by the Beijing authorities. Tai also received death threats.

In response to the decision on constitutional reform proposal of the National People's Congress Standing Committee (NPCSC) which set the restrictive framework on the electoral method of the 2017 Chief Executive election, Tai announced the official start of the Occupy Central with Love and Peace civil disobedience campaign on 28 September 2014 after the student activists' storming of the forecourt of the government headquarters led by Joshua Wong on the last day of the class boycott campaign.

As the occupation ended its first month, Tai and Chan Kin-man resumed their teaching duties at their respective universities and OCLP handed over the command of its medic, marshal and supplies teams to the student groups, the Hong Kong Federation of Students and Scholarism. On 3 December 2014, the Occupy Central trio, along with 62 other key figures turned themselves in to the police, admitting taking part in an unauthorised assembly as originally planned. They declared that they did so to fulfil their promise to bear legal responsibility and uphold the rule of law, as well as to affirm their principles of love and peace.

In March 2017, he and eight other Occupy leaders were arrested on the rare charges of conspiracy to cause public nuisance, inciting others to cause public nuisance, and inciting people to incite others to cause public nuisance. University of Hong Kong principal law lecturer Eric Cheung Tat-ming and criminal defence lawyer Jonathan Midgley described the charges as "not at all common".

In April 2019, Tai was found guilty of conspiracy to cause public nuisance and inciting others to cause public nuisance. He was sentenced to 16 months in prison.

== Operation ThunderGo ==
In early 2016, Tai mapped out an "Operation ThunderGo" for pan-democrats to grab half of the seats in the Legislative Council election to increase political leverage in future political reform in the response to the increasing fragmentation of the pan-democracy camp in the post-Occupy era. He suggested the anti-establishment forces to field no more than 23 lists if their goal was to win 23 seats in the geographical constituencies. For the functional constituencies, Tai suggested that besides retaining the current six trade-based functional constituencies and three territory-wide directly elected District Council (Second) super seats, the camp needed to target three additional seats in Medical, Engineering and Architectural, Surveying, Planning and Landscape. The plan met with reservations from the very diverse interests within pro-democracy political parties, who could not agree on a united front. Tai's plan hit its setback when the Neo Democrats decided not to support the proposed coordinating mechanism for the District Council (Second) super seats in May.

Tai also worked on a "smart voters" system involving 25,000 voters who would indicate their preferences on an interactive poll and would be informed of the popularity of candidates according to polls the day before the official vote and which would be updated through exit polling two and a half hours before polls closed. Such "smart voters" would delay voting until 8 pm and then be signalled to support candidates whose numbers were weaker instead of wasting votes on stronger candidates who were already through.

Tai's Operation ThunderGo was blamed as he released on the election day a list of recommended pro-democratic candidates based on pre-polling. It drew a large number of voters to vote for the candidates who were on the brink of losing as shown in the polls from other candidates, which resulted in the high votes received by fresh faces Eddie Chu, Lau Siu-lai and Nathan Law at other veteran democrats' expenses including Lee Cheuk-yan, Cyd Ho and Frederick Fung who failed to retain their seats.

== Remarks on Hong Kong independence ==
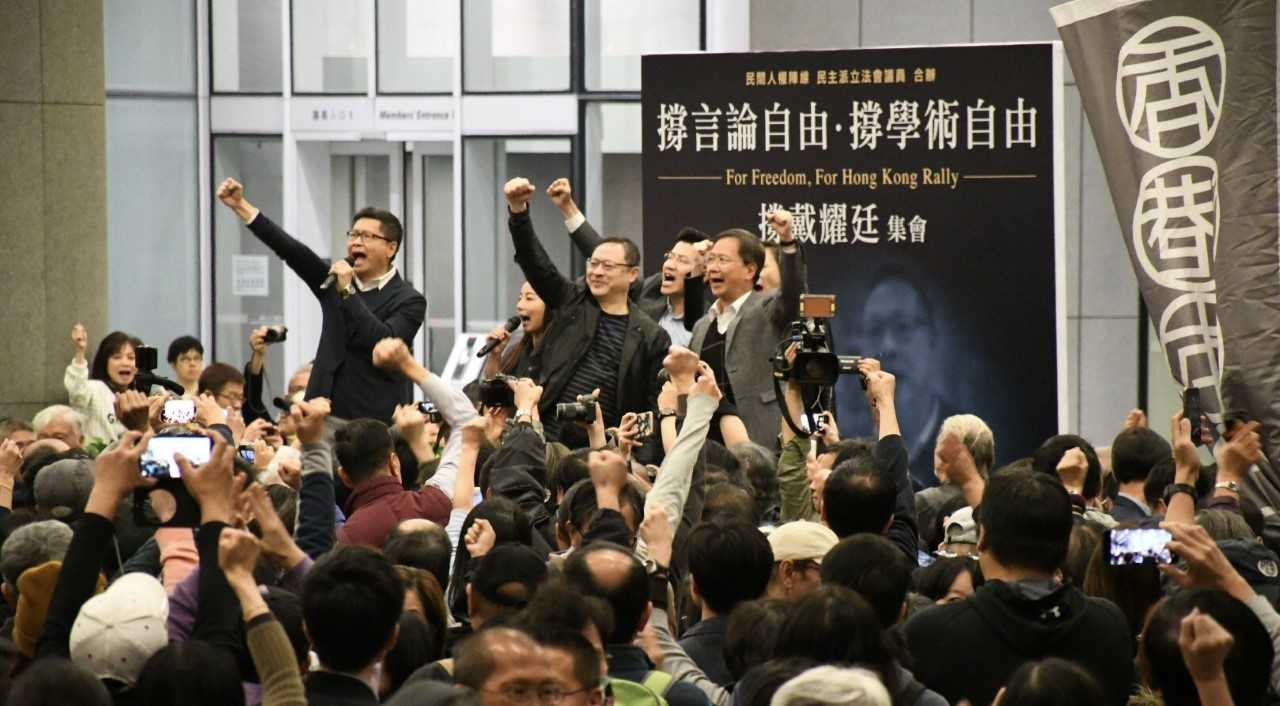
For Freedom, For Hong Kong Rally to support Benny Tai in response to the pro-Beijing attacks in April 2018

In a seminar in Taipei organised by the Taiwan Youth Anti-Communist Corps in March 2018, Tai was recorded making an argument that following the end of "dictatorship" in China, the country's various ethnic groups could exercise their right to self-determination and decide how they could link up with each other. "We could consider going independent, being part of a federal system or a confederation system similar to that of the European Union," he said.

Tai was condemned by Pro-Beijing media in Hong Kong for several days in a row, followed by a rare statement of condemnation from the Hong Kong government. The Hong Kong and Macau Affairs Office (HKMAO) and the Liaison Office also issued strongly worded comments condemning Tai, stating that a "small number of people in Hong Kong have colluded with external separatist forces" to advocate the city's independence. "They have fully exposed their attempts to split the country and violated the national constitution, the Hong Kong Basic Law, and the relevant laws in Hong Kong. They are challenging the bottom line of 'one country, two systems'. Such activities must not be ignored or tolerated." Hong Kong member of the National People's Congress Standing Committee (NPCSC) Tam Yiu-chung asked if it was still appropriate for Tai to keep his job at HKU. Tai responded by saying his comments were "imaginations of the future", which in his opinion did not violate any criminal laws. He also added that he does not support independence. He warned that a "Cultural Revolution-style denouncement could have started against me. It will quickly spread to affect all Hong Kong people." He expressed fears for his personal safety as he suspected that he was being followed by officers from "powerful" mainland agencies who may be posing as journalists, and that the police were unable to help him.

== Project Storm ==
In April 2017, Tai proposed the "Project Storm" to win the majority of the District Council seats for the pro-democrats in the 2019 Hong Kong local elections. He stated that by winning a majority of the some 400 District Council seats, pro-democrats could gain an additional 117 seats of the District Council subsectors on the 1,200-member Election Committee which elects the Chief Executive. Tai believed that by making it harder for Beijing to control the Chief Executive election, it would compel Beijing to restart the stalled political reform after its restrictive proposal was voted down in 2015.

== Arrest for role in 2020 democratic primaries ==
On 6 January 2021, Tai was among 55 members of the pro-democratic camp who were arrested under the national security law, specifically its provision regarding subversion. The group stood accused of organising and participating in unofficial primary elections held by the camp in July 2020. Tai was released on bail on 7 January. In 2024, following a national security trial in Hong Kong, he was sentenced to 10 years in prison for "subversion".

== Personal life ==
Benny Tai is married with one daughter and two sons. He is a Christian who considers himself a "part-time theologian", and said he could write a thesis on the topic of Christianity and the Occupy protests. He stated that his political views were inspired by his Christian faith, adding that the movement was guided by the Reverend Martin Luther King Jr.

== See also ==
- List of Chinese pro-democracy activists
