= Chu Yiu-ming =

Minister of Chai Wan Baptist Church

Reverend Chu Yiu-ming
- 朱耀明
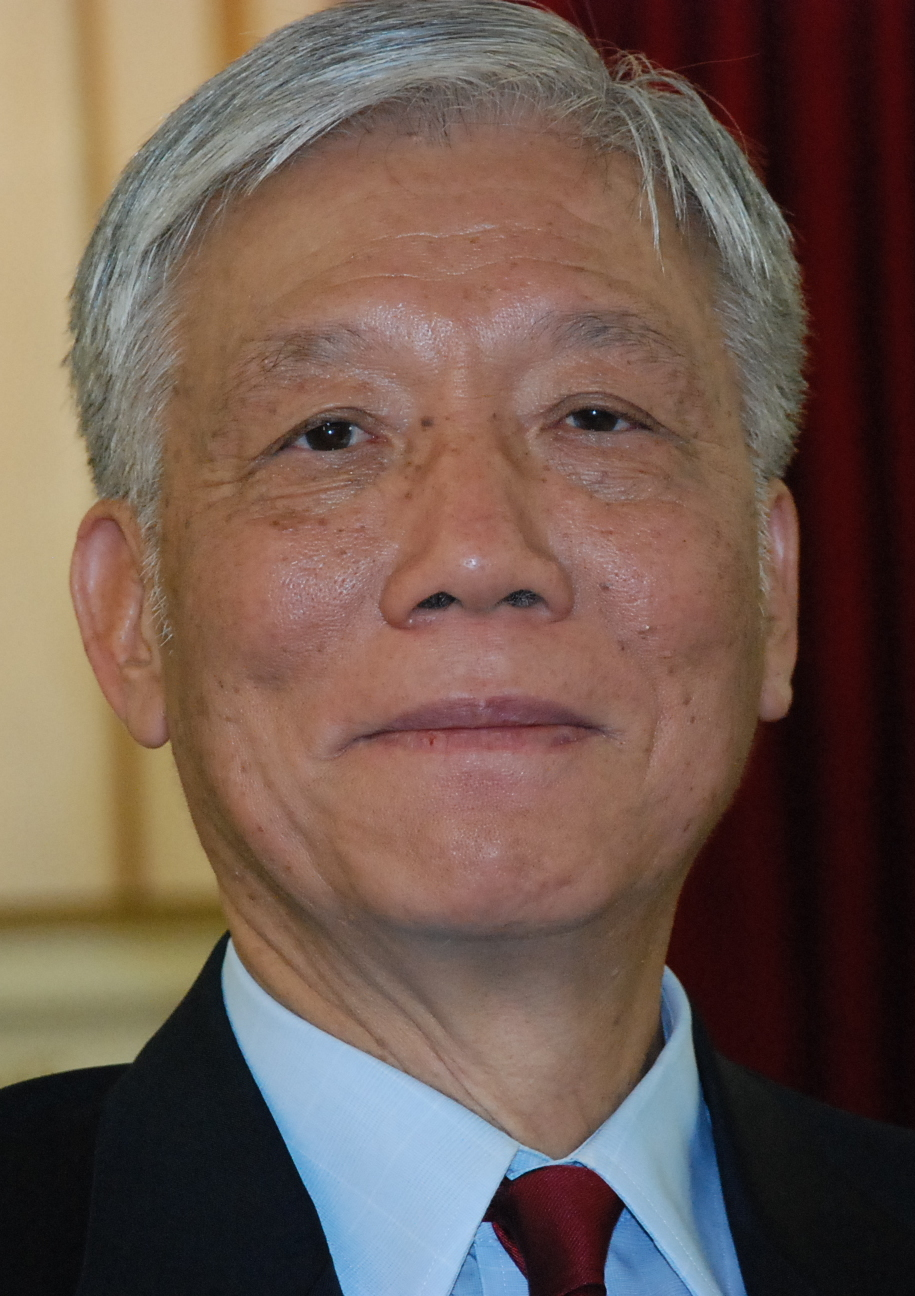
- Chu Yiu-ming
- Born: 10 January 1944 (age 82); Japanese Hong Kong
- Education: Taiwan Baptist Theological Seminary
- Occupation: Minister of religion
- Known for: Co-founder of Occupy Central with Love and Peace
- Children: 2 sons, including Samuel
- Church: Baptist Church
- Ordained: 1 January 1978

Chu Yiu-ming
- Chinese: 朱耀明
Transcriptions
Standard Mandarin
- Hanyu Pinyin: Zhū Yàomíng
Yue: Cantonese
- Jyutping: zyu1 jiu6 ming4

Chu Yiu-ming (Chinese: 朱耀明, born 10 January 1944) is a Hong Kong minister of Chai Wan Baptist Church. He is one of the founders of the Occupy Central campaign for universal suffrage in the 2017 Hong Kong Chief Executive election.

== Biography ==
=== Early life ===
Chu Yiu-ming first lived in mainland China, then settled in Hong Kong. Chu Yiu-ming was baptized in Christianity in Hong Kong and worked in a local Baptist church in Hong Kong's poor Chai Wan district to help drug addicts and gang members. There Chu Yiu-ming was also a supporter of the creation of public hospitals as well as helped Chinese dissidents after the 1989 Tiananmen Square protests.

=== Operation Yellowbird ===
After 1989 Tiananmen Square protests, Chu led a mission dubbed Operation Yellowbird to secretly move persecuted dissidents from mainland China to places overseas via Hong Kong.

=== Occupy Central ===
Chu and 8 other activists were convicted on 9 April 2019 for events towards the Occupy Central and Umbrella Movement protests in 2014. Chu was given a suspended sentence while his other two allies Benny Tai and Chan Kin-man were immediately put in jail for 16 months.

"We strive for democracy, because democracy strives for freedom, equality, and universal love. Political freedom is more than loyalty to the state. It professes human dignity. Every single person living in a community possesses unique potentials and powers, capable of contributing to society. Human right is a God-given gift, never to be arbitrarily taken away by any political regime", he said during the sentencing hearing.

== Family ==
Chu Yiu-ming's son, Samuel Chu, an American political activist, was born in Hong Kong in 1978, and has lived since the 1990s in the United States of America. He is a founder and managing director of Hong Kong Democracy Council, located in Washington, D.C. On 2 August 2020, China Central Television said that Samuel Chu and five other Hongkongers were wanted by Hong Kong police for allegedly inciting secession and collusion with foreign governments to endanger Chinese security, the crimes cited in the new Chinese law, enacted on 30 June 2020 by the communist government of China.
