= Gau wu =

Cantonese expression

Gau Wu (Chinese: 鳩嗚; Jyutping: gau1 wu1) is a Cantonese expression that was coined shortly after an interview clip in which the term was used was broadcast by HK cable TV in August 2014. The expression means "disorderly shouting" or "squabbling over nothing".

Since 2014, Gau Wu has become a street expression, often translated from Cantonese as "shopping", since the expression is near homophonic with "shopping" in Mandarin (購物; gòu wù). It represents a means of expressing discontent with various issues such as the Individual Visit Scheme, parallel traders, and the 831 Decision.

== Origin ==
Gau Wu was originally used during an interview with a Chinese National who participated in a rally known as Sign for Peace and Democracy Movement, expressing her opposition to Occupy Central on 17 August 2014. On the day of the anti-Occupy Central rally, a reporter from HK Cable TV interviewed her and inquired about her role in the event. In Cantonese she replied that she had come to Hong Kong for 'entertainment'. The reporter then asked her what she had planned to do for fun in Hong Kong, and she replied that she was going to shop (Gau Wu). The term Gau Wu has since been used as a satirical term by the anti-Occupy Central movement. It is also used to denote a type of demonstration, disguised as patronising a business district (see details below).

== Background ==
Following an interim injunction order executed the day before, a pro-democracy encampment in Mong Kok affiliated with the Umbrella Movement was cleared by the Hong Kong police force. Following this event, Hong Kong's Chief Executive CY Leung encouraged Hong Kong people and Mainland visitors to shop in Mong Kok in order to support local businesses. As a political tactic, Hong Kong pro-democracy protesters returned to Sai Yeung Choi Street South, a major street in Mong Kok, claiming that they were following the advice of the chief executive. They then started Gau Wu or the "Shopping Revolution" by pretending to shop in busy districts, blocking roads, and wearing out the police force by acting in a flash mob style. Protesters made use of the fact that it was difficult for the police to distinguish between real and "fake" tourists going shopping. The aim was to confuse and provoke the police, and it became a strategy for pressuring the HKSAR Government and continuing the protests' call for "genuine universal suffrage".

== Timeline ==
=== 26 November 2014 ===
Immediately after the execution of the court injunction to clear the Mong Kok encampment, pro-democracy protesters assembled there to express discontent over the police clearance operation by pretending to shop.

=== Late-November to Mid-December ===
Clashes between those pretending to shop and the police broke out from time to time. As the pro-democracy protest continued and expanded from Mong Kok to Tsim Sha Tsui, police increased their presence, demanded people show identification, donned riot gear to some degree, and made more arrests during the process. The protesters taunted and criticised the police for using excessive violence.

=== Mid-December ===
After the clearance of two pro-democracy encampments in Admiralty and Causeway Bay on 11 December 2014, protesters attempted to escalate the campaign by extending the protest area back into Admiralty and Causeway Bay and into Central Bay. Owing to the end of the Occupy Central Movement, activists organised new "shopping events" and "Christmas caroling tours" in these busy shopping districts. Due to the fear of chaos breaking out in the "Shopping Revolution", the New Year's Eve countdown at Times Square in Causeway Bay was cancelled. The Christmas caroling tour debuted on Christmas Eve and Christmas Day. Pro-democracy protesters held yellow umbrellas and paper crosses, pretending to shop in Causeway Bay's shopping district.

=== Early 2015 ===
Rather than a means of pursuing "genuine universal suffrage", Gau Wu, or the Shopping Revolution, has crossed the line into anti-mainland Chinese citizen sentiment. Radical activists expressed discontent towards parallel traders from mainland China. This caused some Hong Kong residents to believe that the protests interfered to some extent by impacting their livelihood when protestors pretend to shop in shopping malls. Recover Yuen Long on 1 March was the most serious of three rounds of protest in the past which took place in Tuen Mun and Shatin. Thirty-three protesters were arrested and accused of possessing offensive weapons, assaulting the police, and indecent assault.

Although Gau Wu still continued, the series of protests pursuing genuine universal suffrage were not as frequent as in 2014. There were fewer citizens participating in the protests.

== Impact of gau wu on Hong Kong ==
=== Cultural meaning ===
"Gau Wu" was ranked seventh among the "Top 10 Buzzwords of 2014" by Yahoo. It was also a focal point for protests in busy districts like Nathan Road during the Umbrella Movement. There are 1,170 videos concerning Gau Wu on YouTube. Spin-offs were created, like Gau Wu Everyday by Mocking Jer which received a total of 730,725 views on YouTube.

=== Advocate of limiting the Individual Visit Scheme ===
Although the Individual Visit Scheme reinvigorated Hong Kong's economy and stimulated local economic growth over the past decade, protesters participating in Gau Wu expressed discontent over the overwhelming number of mainland tourists. This has raised concerns over the carrying capacity of Hong Kong. It has sparked a discussion within the government over whether a new phase of the Individual Visit Scheme should be implemented in order to tighten control over the number of mainland tourists coming to Hong Kong.

=== Worsening relationship between Hong Kong Residents and Mainlanders ===
Gau Wu is often criticised for encouraging discrimination by Hong Kong residents against visiting mainland Chinese citizens who have travelled to shop. This is manifested by Hong Kong residents expressing concerns over the disruption of their local lifestyle. In the face of the escalation of the Shopping protest, a lot of mainlanders think that they are being singled out, or being discriminated against, by Hong Kong residents. This has created a hostility between Hong Kong citizens and mainlanders.

=== Decline in customers ===
Due to the continuous 'Gau Wu (Shopping Revolution) which opposes mainland Chinese parallel traders, pharmacy, boutique and cosmetic sales have declined.

== See also ==
- 2014 Hong Kong protests
- Umbrella Movement
- Occupy Central
