= Umbrella Movement =

2014 Hong Kong political movement

- Date: 28 September – 15 December 2014 (79 days)
- Location: Admiralty, Mong Kok, Causeway Bay, Hong Kong
- Also known as: Occupy Central Movement
- Cause: China's decision to rule out full universal suffrage in Hong Kong
- Organised by: Civil Disobedience Movement
- Participants: Scholarism; Hong Kong Federation of Students; Occupy Central with Love and Peace; Civil Human Rights Front; Civic Party; Democratic Party; Hong Kong Association for Democracy and People's Livelihood; Labour Party; League of Social Democrats; People Power; Power for Democracy; Civic Passion

Umbrella Movement
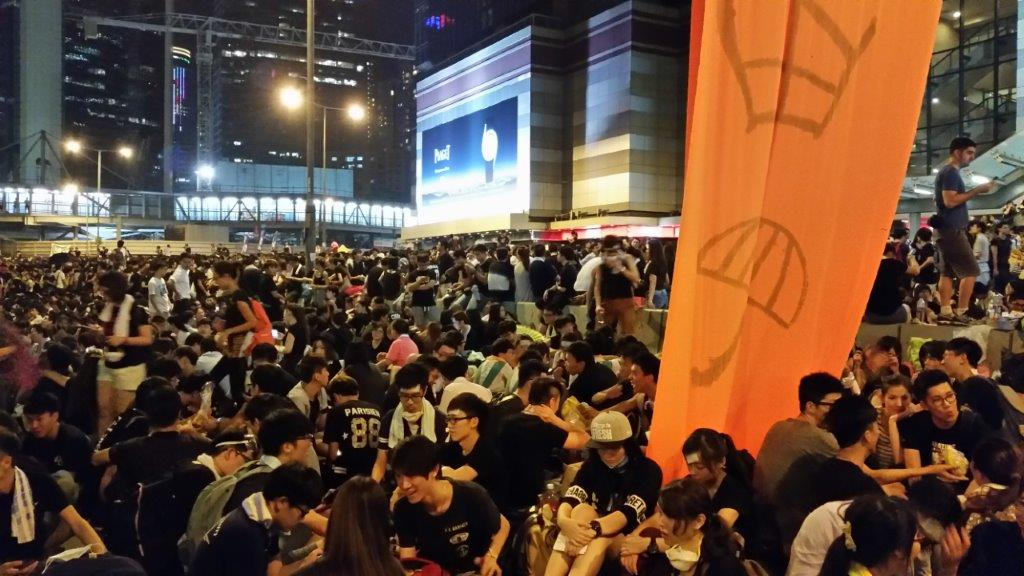
- Umbrella banner, Admiralty, Hong Kong, 29 September 2014
- Traditional Chinese: 雨傘運動
- Simplified Chinese: 雨伞运动
Transcriptions
Standard Mandarin
- Hanyu Pinyin: Yǔsǎn Yùndòng
- Wade–Giles: Yü-san Yün-tung
Hakka
- Romanization: Yi^{3}san^{4} Yun^{4}tung^{4}
Yue: Cantonese
- Yale Romanization: Yúhsaan Wahnduhng
- Jyutping: Jyu5saan3 Wan6dung6

The Umbrella Movement (Chinese: 雨傘運動) was a political movement that emerged during the 2014 Hong Kong protests. Its name arose from the use of umbrellas as defense against police pepper spray to disperse the crowd during the protests, sparked by the decision of the Standing Committee of the National People's Congress (NPCSC) of the People's Republic of China of 31 August 2014 that prescribed a selective pre-screening of candidates for the 2017 election of Hong Kong's chief executive.

== Name ==
The name 'Umbrella Revolution' was coined by Adam Cotton on Twitter on 26 September 2014, in reference to the umbrellas used for defense against police pepper spray, and quickly gained widespread acceptance after appearing in an article in The Independent on 28 September reporting the use of teargas against protestors that day.

== Political movement ==
=== Occupation on campuses ===
Protest banners were displayed in Hong Kong universities such as University of Hong Kong, Chinese University of Hong Kong, Hong Kong University of Science and Technology, Open University of Hong Kong, Hong Kong Baptist University, Lingnan University, City University of Hong Kong, and Hong Kong secondary schools such as King's College, Queen's College, Immaculate Heart of Mary College, and St. Paul's College.

=== Occupation of Hong Kong areas ===
On 23 October, demonstrators hung a protest banner at the peak of Lion Rock; On the next day it was dismantled by the government. Since then the public launched the campaign of "demolish one, hang ten", on each of Hong Kong mountains and islands, including Tai Mo Shan, Devil's Peak, Tai Tung Shan, Castle Peak, the Peak, Kowloon Peak, Tung Ping Chau and so on, banners "I need real universal suffrage" were hung, while on the Lion Rock many times during and after the occupation, banners "I need real universal suffrage" were hung again. In addition, between 30 September and 2 October, various areas in Hong Kong were in echo of the occupation, including nearby the MTR Sheung Shui station (30 September) (where HK URBEX produced a short film to support the movement), Sham Shui Po, Kwai Shing East, Tai Wai, Tuen Mun, Chai Wan, Kwun Tong and other places.

=== Solidarity rallies in China and abroad ===
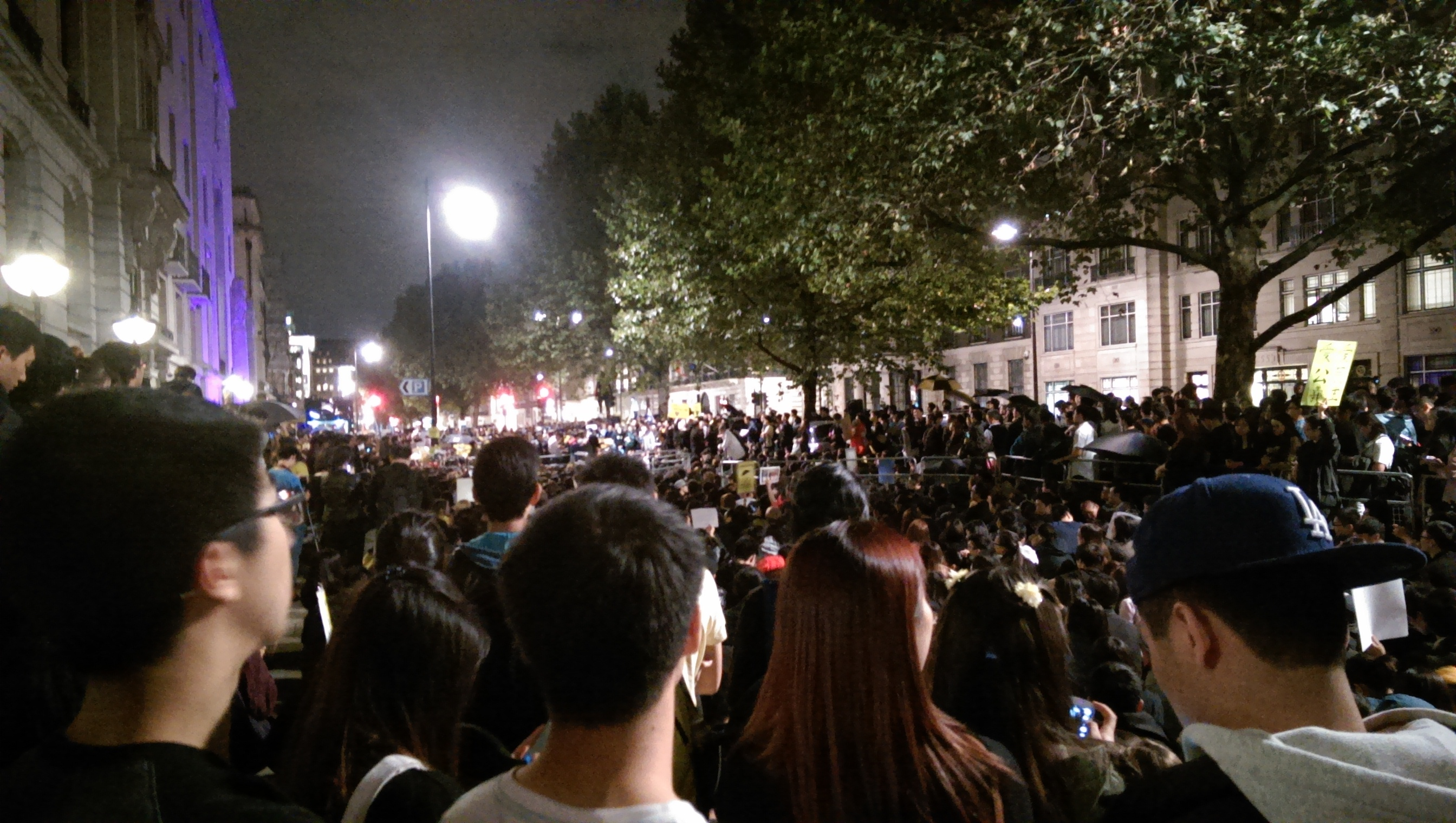
4,000–5,000 people gathered outside Chinese Embassy in London to support the protests in Hong Kong on 1 October 2014.

Rallies in support of the protests occurred in over 64 cities worldwide by October 2014, principally in front of Hong Kong trade missions or Chinese consulates. A demonstration in front of the Chinese embassy in London attracted 3000 participants. Petitions in Australia and to the White House urging support for the protests have collected more than 500 and 183,000 signatures respectively. In Taiwan's capital city Taipei, locals organised a solidarity protest, where participants were reported to have scuffled with Taiwanese police after crowding a Hong Kong trade office. On 1 October, a gathering in Taipei's Liberty Square drew over 10,000 people in support of the protests. In Singapore, hundreds of people participated in a candlelight vigil at Hong Lim Park on 1 October to show support to the Occupy Central protesters. In Australia, during the 2014 G20 Brisbane summit, Hong Kong student Alvin Cheng and Nardo Wai started a 4-hour rally in support for the Umbrella Revolution on the lawn near the South Bank Parkland Suncorp Piazza outside the G20 summit venue. Numerous oversea students from Hong Kong, Taiwan and Mainland China participated in the rally. Nardo participated in a hunger strike, and unfurled a banner with "Support HK Umbrella Revolution" outside the hotel in which Communist Party general secretary Xi Jinping was scheduled to stay, but were banned from the G20 security zones, doubted by media Australia losing its democracy.

On the campus of the University of Macau, solidarity protest banners were displayed.

== Events ==
Some of the major historical events in "Umbrella Movement" are closely related to the occupied territories, including but not limited to the following events:

- 2014 Hong Kong class boycott campaign (22–26 September)
- "Occupy Central" official launch (28 September – 3 December)
- Disperse and clearance operation in Mong Kok (25–27 November)

== De facto membership ==
The movement was composed of many fractious groups, but has no leadership or formal organisation overall, although Scholarism, the Hong Kong Federation of Students (HKFS), Occupy Central with Love and Peace (OCLP) are among the most prominent groups, whose agendas differ and may even oppose each other. Although the term "Occupy Central" was often used interchangeably in the press to describe the protests and the movement, OCLP declared themselves as supporters rather than the organisers of the protest, stated that the ongoing protest "[was] the Umbrella Movement, not 'Occupy Central'". Colours and members of the following groups have been regularly seen on site during the occupation:

- Civil Human Rights Front
- Hong Kong Federation of Students
- Scholarism
- Civic Party
- Democratic Party
- Hong Kong Association for Democracy and People's Livelihood
- Labour Party
- League of Social Democrats
- People Power
- Civic Passion

== Background ==
Hong Kong was a part of the former British Empire. In 1997, control of the city was handed over to China, known as the handover of Hong Kong. When this control of Hong Kong was handed over to China there was a special agreement made called "one country, two systems". This agreement was made to ensure that Hong Kong had some independence from China.

== Philosophical principles ==
OCLP, the originators of the campaign, as well as the student groups – HKFS and Scholarism – adopted and adhered to the principle of non-violent civil disobedience and the willingness to assume the consequential legal responsibility. The protesters' politeness, tidiness and "staunch adherence to nonviolence" was widely commented on. Protesters have written signs to apologise for the inconvenience caused and to denounce isolated incidents of vandalism.

The civil disobedience actions opened up debate within and outside Hong Kong as to its effect on the rule of law.

== Factional philosophical and tactical differences ==
Important philosophical and tactical differences between the students and OCLP have been noted. While the 3-day OCLP civil disobedience was due to start on 1 October to send a message without causing major disruption, students wanted immediate occupation and staged a sit-in on 26 September. OCLP's hand was effectively forced by the turn of events, and their proclamation of the start of the civil disobedience campaign met with widespread criticism that the action was not "Occupy Central". OCLP's goal from the outset was passive resistance campaign of a defined duration, after which they would surrender to the police; their plan was not to resist removal or clearance, but there was radical sentiment of students and others to resist and escalate. The scale of the protests exceeded the expectations of most people, including the groups involved, and after police manifestly failed to contain and control the gathering crowds even through use of tear gas on 28 September, demonstrators did not heed the advice of the HKFS and others to de-escalate to avoid the possibility of use of heavier weapons.

After the Mong Kok occupiers and occupation site were attacked by anti-occupation protesters, OCLP leader, University of Hong Kong professor Benny Tai, as well as Lester Shum of the HKFS and Agnes Chow of Scholarism, urged immediate retreat from Mong Kok to regroup at Admiralty to avoid violence and bloodshed, but their calls were not heeded. As another example of tactical divisions, not-so-passive occupiers re-seized the Mong Kok encampment after it was initially cleared by police. The divisions within the movement appear to have been most marked at the Mong Kok occupation site, where a left–right split followed the central divide on Nathan Road. Student groups and liberal NGOs mostly occupy the western carriageway, while groups with a more radical agenda urging more direct and confrontational protest actions sited themselves on the eastern side of the road. Civic Passion, which denigrates moderates and has even denounced student leaders as "useless", saw its influence in the movement increase as time went by as ordinary suffragists drifted back to their daily lives.

"The Straits Times" noted that, after 33 days of occupation, the two sides seemed to be entrenched in the impasse and hawks gaining the upper hand while moderates leaving. Tai and fellow OCLP leader Chinese University of Hong Kong professor Chan Kin-man left due to exhaustion from attempting to exert a moderating influence on the more radical members of HKFS and hardline groups; third parties that acted as mediators were sidelined. Civic Party legislator Ronny Tong said: "Any suggestion that they leave [is] not a matter of rational discussion any more".

Members of radical group Civic Passion broke into a side-entrance to the Legislative Council Complex in the early hours of 19 November, breaking glass panels with concrete tiles and metal barricades. Legislator Fernando Cheung and other suffragists tried to stop the radical activists, but were pushed aside. The break-in was criticised by all the three activist groups of the protests, and legislators from both the pan-democracy and pro-Beijing camps, although the criticism from the student groups was less than categorical. The team organising legal assistance declined to help those arrested in the attempted break-in because the violence was not compatible with the principles of the movement. Tactical divergences have caused disagreement between some more "front line" activists and organizational core (大台/大會) when the latter came under criticism for preventing excursions or escalations of the former. After a failed attempt to block off access to government headquarters overnight on 30 November 2014, OCLP leader Benny Tai urged a full withdrawal to avoid any further physical harm by "out of control" police commanded by "a government that is beyond reason". On the day the OCLP trio surrendered to the police, Scholarism leader Joshua Wong and two others had entered a hunger strike.

== Demographics ==
According to a survey of 1562 people between 20 and 26 October at the occupied sites by two young academics published on Ming Pao, over three-quarters of the respondents were aged between 18 and 39 years of age; 37 percent of respondents were aged 24 years or below. Only 26 percent are students, while 58 percent are self-employed or white collar workers. 56 percent were educated to university or post-graduate level. In terms of motivation, 87 percent of respondents demand "real universal suffrage", 68 percent felt that their grievances were being ignored by the government, and 51 percent were angry at the police handling of the protests overall. 15 percent of respondents had never participated in any protests or social movements prior to the September protests.

Notwithstanding, the movement is considered very much a student movement, a defining moment where an entire generation of youths have experienced political awakening similar to the Californian Summer of Love in 1967. Hong Kong youth are seen to have broken out of a cramped or cosy domestic environment into a community built around a cause, and held together with a sense of danger. Journals and documentaries have commented on the sexual politics, and remarked at the changing sexual stereotypes the movement has brought to the city, noting that females appear to be emerging from the undercurrent that women are expected to adhere to their domestic roles, and taking more leadership roles in society. Many of the city's once-spoilt youngsters have learned self-discipline and to live within a community, and playing a role that may include janitorial tasks.

The three street camps across Hong Kong have their own distinctive character. Umbrella Square (Admiralty site), was largely dominated by students, seen to be loftier and more idealistic, and its ambiance was likened to Woodstock. Mong Kok, being a typically more working-class neighbourhood, occupation was regarded as being more earthy and more volatile. Causeway Bay, the smallest encampment with only about a dozen tents towards the end of the occupation, had a reputation for earnestness.

== Organization ==
=== Operating funding sources ===
The economy in the occupied territories is mostly maintained by people's spontaneous donation, in the form of Utopia through or not through supplies station to share to the local residents. In addition, there are conspiracy theories pointed out Jimmy Lai is the main source of income in the occupied territories.

=== Rest areas ===
The people living in the occupied territories initially mainly resided on the road, lying on the ground to sleep. After 10 October 2014, by the appeal of Hong Kong Federation of Students and Scholarism, people mainly resided inside their spontaneous tents. Then, some tents were reinforced by plastic plate or board to cope with the rainwater penetration. Later, people finished up the tabernacles, making the tent groups to form small communities, such as Nathan Village, Harcourt village and so on.

=== Logistics ===
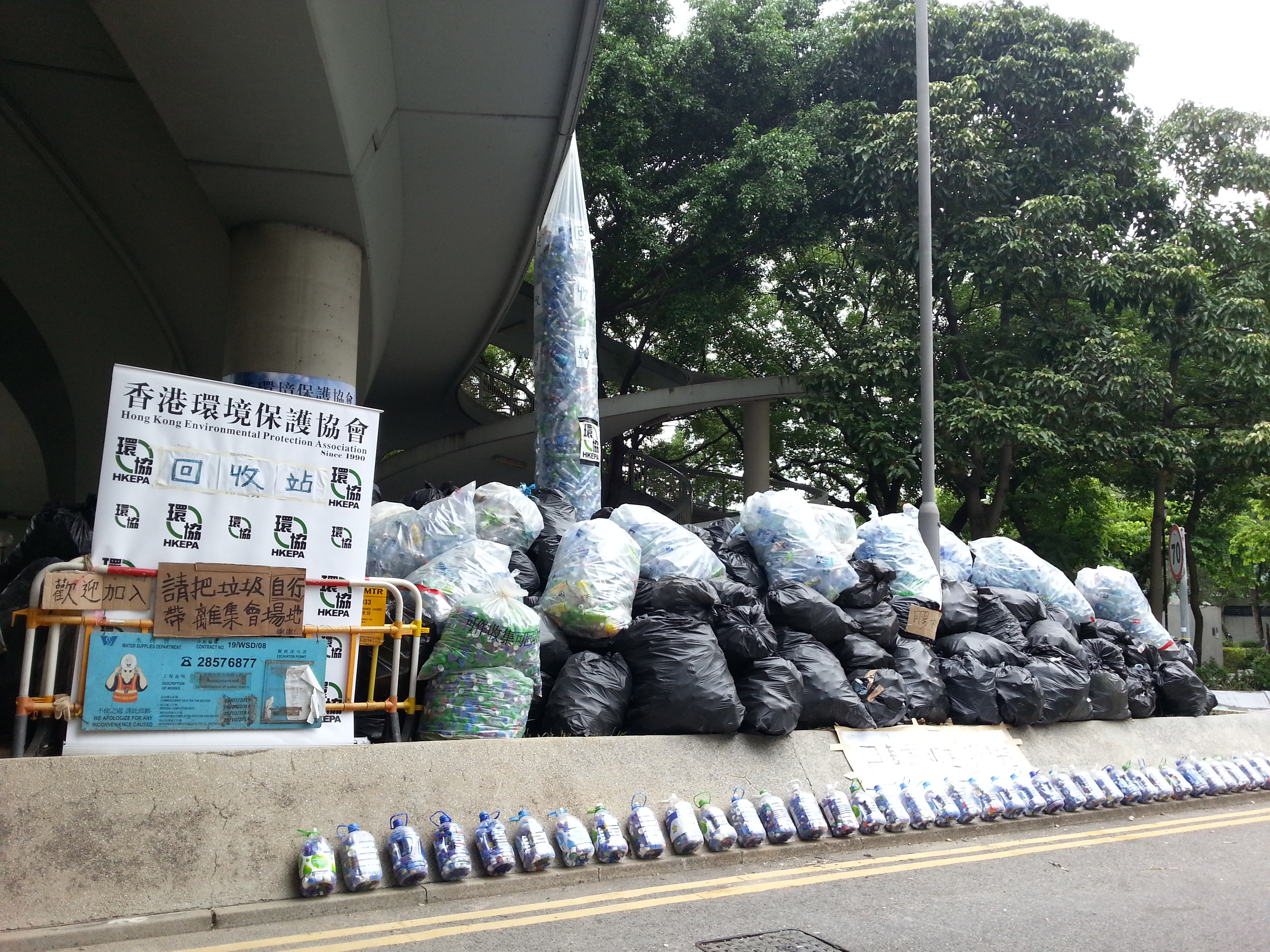
Volunteer-organized recycling station on Harcourt Road, Admiralty, inside the occupation zone

Time magazine described the organised chaos of the protest sites as "classical political anarchism: a self-organizing community that has no leader". Teams of volunteers working in shifts dealt with garbage collection and recycling, security and medical care. Well-stocked supply stations dispensed water and other basic necessities such as toilet paper, saline solution, instant coffee and cereal bars free of charge. The medical team in Admiralty consisted of more than 200 volunteers across four stations. Wooden steps were built to allow people to cross over the central divide of the eight-lane carriageway in Admiralty. A study area was created, complete with desk lamps and Wi-Fi; mobile phone charging stations were powered by electricity generators and wind turbines.

=== Security ===
Security as an issue was anticipated by OCLP, and a team of 50 marshals were put in place to secure the sites, although this was not universally welcomed. The head of the team was a professional life-guard and unionist. However, the fragmented leadership of the movement was complicated by some groups, which challenge the leadership of OCLP, also refuse to submit to the marshals' authority, for example, their removal of some barricades was challenged.

=== Communication ===
Some protesters have used the online forum HKGolden to communicate plans, and occasionally to dox anti-Occupy figures, in addition to inventing memes and parody songs. The operation to block Lung Wo Road on 14 October 2014 was planned on the forum. On 18 October, the police arrested a HKGolden user for urging others to join the Occupy protests in Mong Kok, charge at police cordons, and paralyse the railways. He was charged with "access to computer with criminal or dishonest intent", the first such arrest since the protests began. As of 9 November fourteen protesters have since been arrested for "access to computer with criminal or dishonest intent".

The protesters have been targeted with malware, according to a security consultancy, which believed that Chinese intelligence was responsible. Protesters used peer-to-peer messaging, such as WhatsApp and FireChat due to fears of the police disrupting mobile services. Mesh networks such as FireChat and Serval Mesh have the potential to circumvent government oversight even if the Internet is being shut down. Since FireChat messages are not encrypted, protesters also used Telegram.

== Art and culture ==
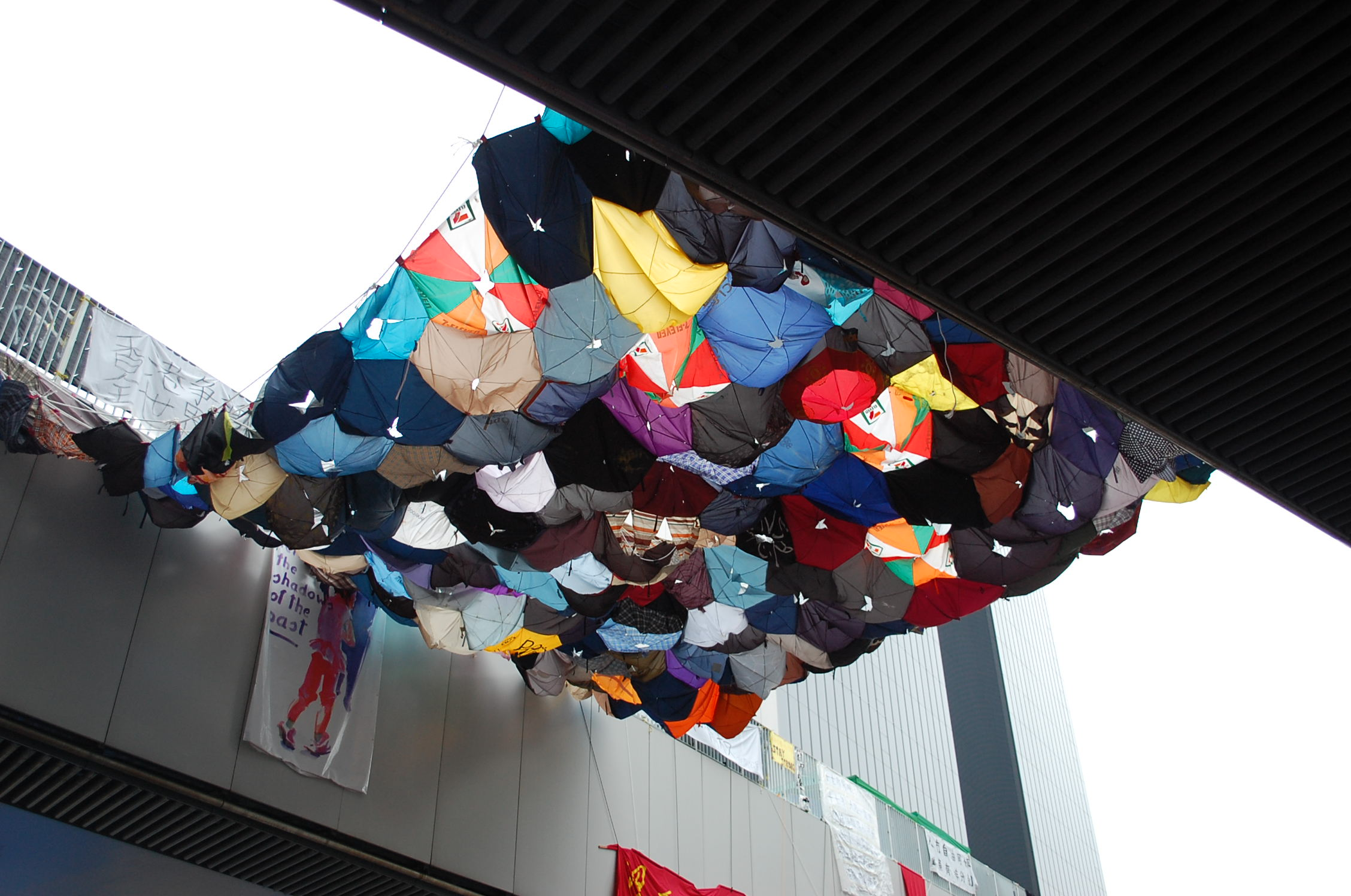
Umbrella art strung between two footbridges

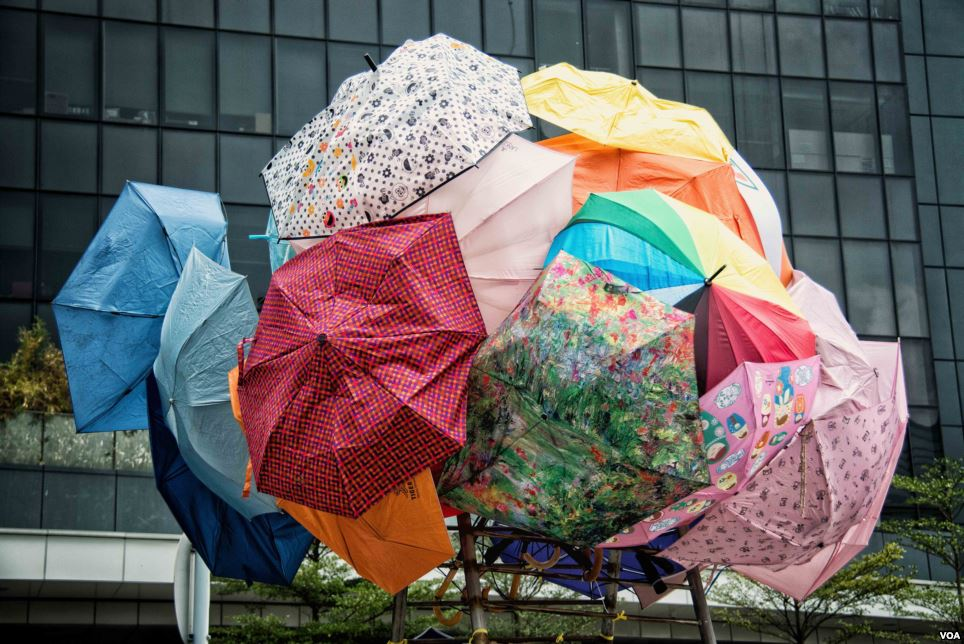
The Umbrella Installation on the Tim Mei Avenue

Art works and installations have appeared at protest sites, attracting interest from the world's media. These include the walls of the circular staircase leading up to the pedestrian skybridge near the entrance of Hong Kong's Central Government Office covered with multi-coloured post-it notes bearing messages of good cheer or defiance, named the "Lennon Wall" after the Lennon Wall in Prague, Czech Republic. John Lennon's song "Imagine" is often quoted on pro-democracy posters and banners, and became one of the anthems of the occupation. In addition to the use of traditional protests songs, banners, logos for the movement, installations and sculptures of all sizes have been created, including 'Umbrella Man', an iconic 3-metre statue created out of wood blocks, with an arm outstretched holding an umbrella. The umbrella and the yellow ribbon have inspired a large number of memes. The 28-metre banner hung on Lion Rock also inspired numerous memes, and a 3D scale model. An image of Xi Jinping holding an umbrella that won a top photojournalism award in China inspired another bout of meme-creation, and has appeared on banners and cardboard cut-outs. There are efforts to preserve the art, but the city's government-funded museums are uncooperative.

== Mobile protests ==
Fearing re-occupation of the Mong Kok occupation site, in excess of 4,000 police were deployed to the area. Large crowds, ostensibly heeding a call from Chief Executive C. Y. Leung to return to the shops affected by the occupation, have appeared nightly in and around Sai Yeung Choi Street South (close to the former occupied site); hundreds of armed riot police charged demonstrators with shields, pepper spraying and wrestling a string of them to the ground. Protesters intent on "shopping" remained until dawn. Nightly shopping tours continued in Mong Kok, tying up some 2500 police officers, ostensibly at the behest of C. Y. Leung to help restore the economy of the once-occupied areas. The minibus company that took out the Mong Kok injunction (a restraining order from the court to stop protesters occupying roads in the district) was in turn accused of having illegally occupied Tung Choi Street for years.

On Christmas Eve, 250 protesters marched from Southorn Playground to Civic Square. Around 7:00 pm, 500 "shopping" (referred to as "gau wu" by participants) protesters with yellow banners and umbrellas, gathered in Shantung Street, then Argyle Street and Nathan Road. Ten men and two women aged between 13 and 76 were arrested. In Causeway Bay, people hung a yellow banner on the Times Square clock tower. The banner was removed by the police. No arrests were made as the protesters were on private property. A group of students hung a banner on Lennon Wall. About 30 people had been arrested.

== "Rule of law" discourse ==
The rule of law is a pillar of Hong Kong society and a core value of Hong Kong. In an ongoing discussion since the beginning of the movement, there have been polarised definitions of "rule of law" as applied to the civil disobedience movement. The local government and Chinese state officials and media have repeatedly emphasised the aspect pertaining to obedience and respect of laws and pronounced on the illegality of the movement's occupation and protests, while pan democrats see the concept as being about the law as check and balance against absolute power of government. Even in a policy speech one month after the end of the occupation, the Chief Executive once again stated that the Umbrella movement has jeopardised the rule of law and risked plunging the territory into a state of anarchy. The tendency of the government preface with such mentions was noted in the speech of the outgoing chairman of the local Bar association, Paul Shieh, who spoke of his concern over "an increasing tendency on the part of the executive in Hong Kong, in its public statements, to emphasise the 'obey the law' aspect of the Rule of Law" in a way that mirrors practice on the mainland. Secretary of Justice Rimsky Yuen blamed the movement for "large-scale as well as sporadic unlawful activities that [bring] about blatant challenges to the rule of law". However, the Chief Justice Geoffrey Ma said people involved in the Occupation Movement have "demonstrated the respect that most people have for the rule of law and emphasised once again the pivotal position it occupies in our community". Ma reiterated that "It is no part of the courts' function to solve political questions, but only to determine legal questions even though the reason for bringing legal proceedings may be a political one."

== Subsequent violence and intimidation ==
Before, during, and after the occupation, activists of the movement have been intimidated with threats, been victims of hacking, been put under surveillance and subjected to invasions of privacy and other forms of harassment that the Christian Science Monitor quotes analysts saying are "alarmingly similar to the way mainland Chinese activists and their families have long been targeted". All of the OCLP trio have been targeted: Chan having banners denouncing him appear near his home, attempted hacking of his email, family members tailed, men staking out his house around the clock, receiving hate mail, death threats and even letters containing razor blades; Tai having his email account hacked, receiving hate mail and nuisance telephone calls; Chu giving up using his mobile phone due to persistent crank or threatening calls, his son being followed and filmed when making school runs, the photographs being posted up subsequently near his home and church; Wong having had his telephone numbers (and that of his mother) and his purported address made public.

Some of the intimidation is from official sources. Activists have been arrested and had their residences searched, police have demonstrated elevated levels of violent suppression and brutality. The heavy-handed policing, including the use of tear gas on peaceful protesters, was widely credited with inspiring tens of thousands of citizens to join the protests in Admiralty. However, police spokesmen maintained that officers exercised "maximum tolerance" and blamed the violence on protesters, although this has been contradicted by the media.

=== Anti-Occupy attacks ===
Groups of anti-Occupy Central activists including triad members and locals attacked suffragists on 3 October, tearing down their tents and barricades in Mong Kok and Causeway Bay. A student suffered head injuries. Journalists were also attacked. Police were criticised for reacting too lightly and too late when protesters were under attack. The Foreign Correspondents' Club accused the police of appearing to arrest alleged attackers but releasing them shortly after. Albert Ho of Democratic Party said communists in mainland China "use triads or pro-government mobs to try to attack you so the government will not have to assume responsibility".

During a police operation to clear protesters on 15 October, Civic Party member Ken Tsang was assaulted in an act graphically filmed and broadcast on local television. He was carried off with his hands tied behind his back by seven police officers; then officers took turns to punch, kick and stamp on him for about four minutes. Journalists complained that they too had been assaulted. Numerous other instances of excessive violence by police have been reported, namely the first attempted clearance of Mong Kok occupation, the Lung Wo Road clearance operation, and during the "gau wu" protests in Mong Kok.

=== Travel restriction ===
Some individuals have also seen their freedom to travel curtailed by Hong Kong, Macau and mainland China authorities, and had their Home Return Permits revoked. The HKFS delegation led by Alex Chow was prevented from travelling to China on 15 November 2014. Airline officials informed them that mainland authorities had revoked their Home Return Permits, effectively banning them from boarding the flight to speak to government officials in Beijing. At least 30 other individuals have been similarly denied entry to the mainland. A junior member of Cathay Pacific flight crew out of Hong Kong airport was also prevented from entering Shanghai, and no reason was given. Media speculated from her Facebook account that the reason may have been her support for the movement and her attendance at the occupation site. Media sources suggest that some 500 movement activists' names are on the PRC blacklist for inbound travel. Scholarism member Tiffany Chin (錢詩文) was detained by public security bureau officers as she landed in Kunming on a family visit on 18 February 2015; her baggage and those of her mother were searched, and officials pored over her notebooks. Chin was put under house arrest in a room in an airport hotel watched over by two officials and was forbidden from approaching windows. Chin said the officials told her that she was denied entry for endangering national security. She was permitted to return to Hong Kong the next day and her Home Return Permit was returned to her.

=== Police handling of teenage protesters ===
In December 2014, Police applied for Care and Protection Orders (CPO) against two young suffragists. Typically, CPOs are only used in severe cases of juvenile delinquency, and could lead to the minor being sent to a children's home and removed from parental custody. Police arrested one 14-year-old male for contempt of court during the clearance of Mong Kok and applied for a CPO. The CPO was cancelled four weeks later when the Department of Justice decided that they would not prosecute.

In a second case, a 14-year-old female who drew a chalk flower onto the Lennon Wall on 23 December 2014 was arrested on suspicion of criminal damage, detained by police for 17 hours, and then held against her will in a children's home for 20 days, but was never charged with any crime. A magistrate decided in favour of a CPO pursuant to a police application, deeming it "safer". The incident created uproar as she was taken away from her hearing-impaired father, and was unable to go to school.

On 19 January, another magistrate rescinded the protection order for the girl–now commonly known as "Chalk Girl" (粉筆少女)–however overall handling of the situation by police and government officials raised broad concerns. There is no official explanation as to why proper procedures were not followed or as to why, in accordance with regulations, social workers were never consulted before applying for the order. The controversy gained international attention, and The Guardian produced a short documentary film about her story, titled "The Infamous Chalk Girl" which was released in 2017. Use of the device against minors involved in the Umbrella Movement was seen as "white terror" to deter young people from protesting.

== Aftermath ==
=== Government's electoral reform rejected ===
On 18 June 2015, the Legislative Council rejected the government's electoral reform proposal by 28 votes to 8.

=== "Umbrella soldiers" ===
The movement spawned new groupings such as Hong Kong Indigenous and Youngspiration seeking political change. The first wave of novitiates, about 50 in number, many of whom were born in the new millennium having political aspirations and disillusioned with the political establishment and affected by the Umbrella Movement, contested the 2015 district council elections. Pitted against seasoned politicians, and electioneering support often only from friends and family, they were popularly known as "Umbrella Soldiers". Nine of these new politicians succeeded in getting elected; veteran pro-establishment legislators Christopher Chung and Elizabeth Quat were both ousted from their District Council seats by the newcomers.

=== Imprisonment of prominent instigators ===
Wong and two other prominent Hong Kong pro-democracy student leaders, Nathan Law and Alex Chow, were sentenced to six to eight months' imprisonment on 17 August 2017 for occupying Civic Square at the Central Government Complex at Tamar site. The sentence was expected to impair their political careers, as they faced barring from running for public office for five years. Just days earlier, 13 fellow Umbrella Movement activists had been convicted of unlawful assembly in relation to the events in 2014, receiving sentences of 8 to 13 months' imprisonment. On the Sunday following their sentencing, 20 August, a large demonstration of umbrella-carrying Hongkongers, the most massive since the 2014 occupation, took place.

On 1 October 2017, National Day of the People's Republic of China, a demonstration under the rubric "Anti Authoritarian Rule" again called for release of jailed activists, as well as demanding resignation of the Chief Executive Carrie Lam and Secretary for Justice Rimsky Yuen. A prominent slogan read, "Without democracy, how can we have the rule of law?" The organisers, Demosisto, the League of Social Democrats and the Civil Human Rights Front, estimated 40,000 people participated.

On 24 October 2017, Joshua Wong and Nathan Law were granted bail pending appeal by the Court of Final Appeal.

On 9 April 2019, nine of the initiators, including Benny Tai, Rev Chu Yiu-ming and Chan Kin-man, were found guilty in a Hong Kong court for inciting public nuisance or inciting others to incite.

On 15 August 2019, Benny Tai was released on HK$100,000 cash bail, surrendering his travel document.

On 28 July 2020, the governing council of the University of Hong Kong decided to dismiss associate professor Benny Tai.

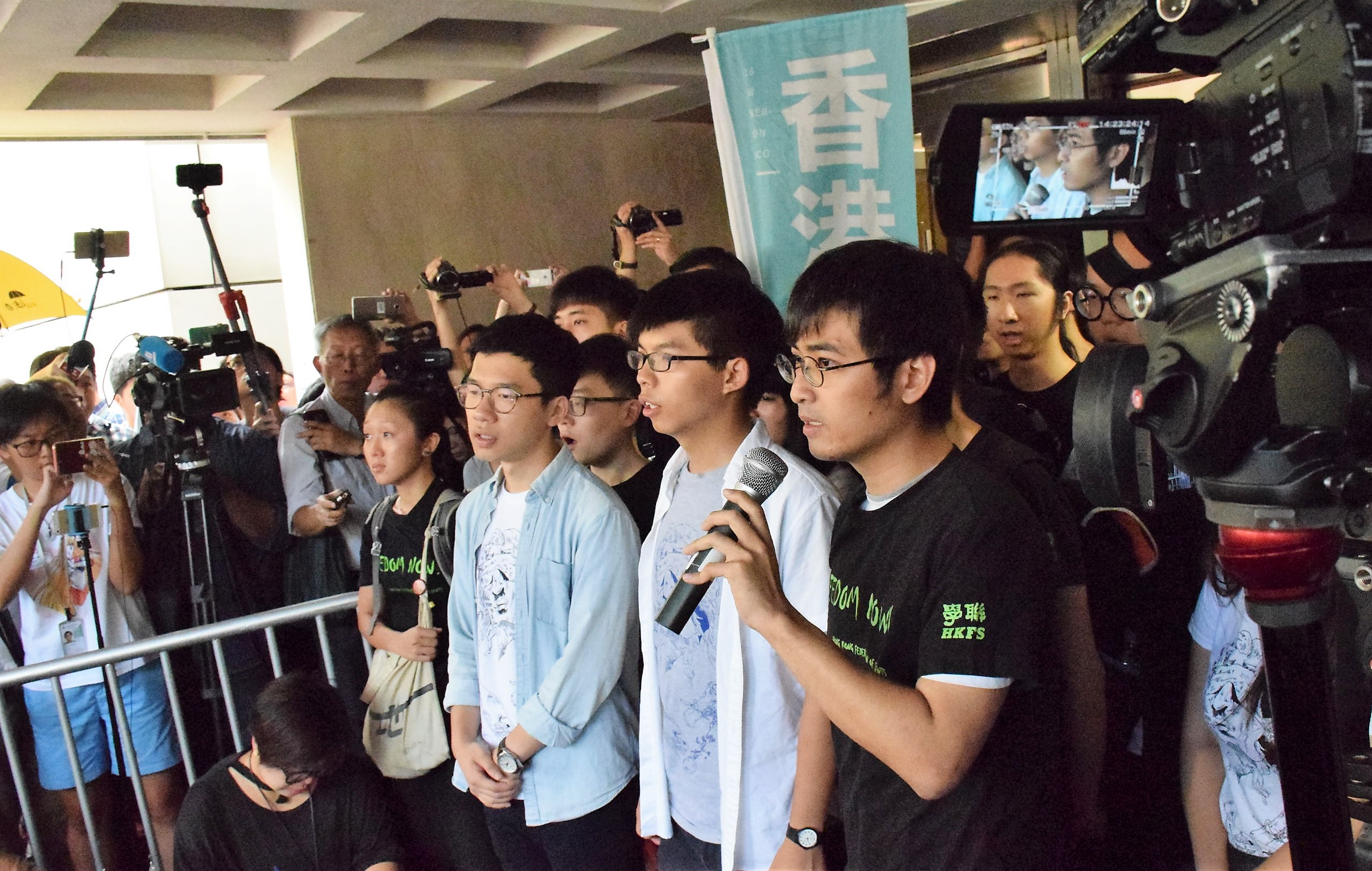
17 August 2017: Nathan Law, Joshua Wong, Alex Chow (L–R) at main entrance of the High Court before sentencing

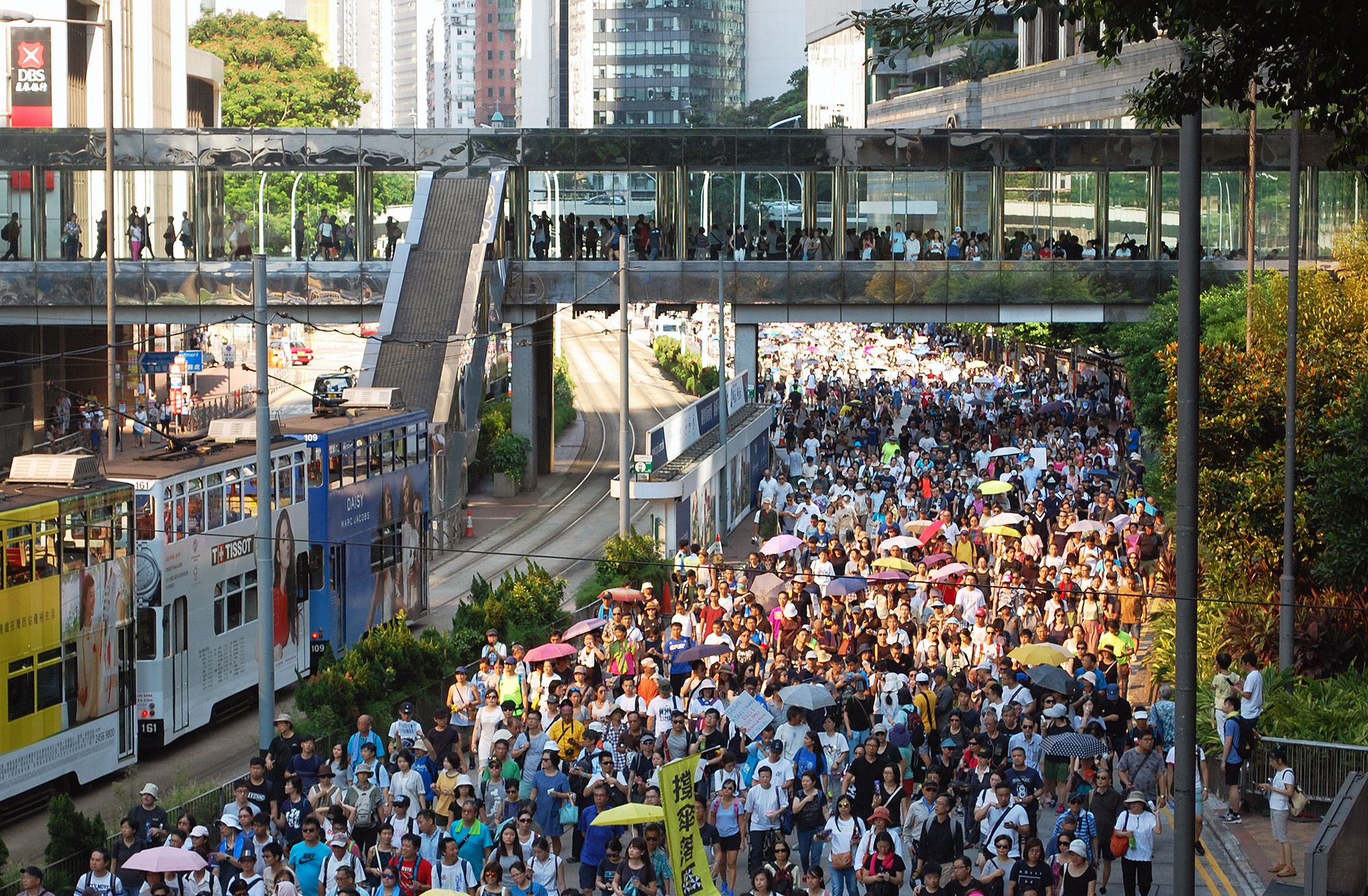
20 August 2017; march in support of jailed Hong Kong activists

=== Nobel Peace Prize nomination ===
On 5 October 2017, the Congressional-Executive Commission on China (CECC) Chair US Senator Marco Rubio and co-chair US Representative Chris Smith announced their intention to nominate Joshua Wong, Nathan Law, Alex Chow and the entire Umbrella Movement for the 2018 Nobel Peace Prize, for "their peaceful efforts to bring political reform and protect the autonomy and freedoms guaranteed Hong Kong in the Sino-British Joint Declaration".

=== Slogan ===
In the Sunflower Movement, "Today Hong Kong, Tomorrow Taiwan" was used to express opposition to the Cross-Strait Service Trade Agreement with China in Taiwan. On the other hand, during the Umbrella Movement, the phrase "Today Taiwan, Tomorrow Hong Kong" was used to signify the desire to achieve the same level of democratization in Hong Kong that Taiwan had previously experienced.

== Legacy ==
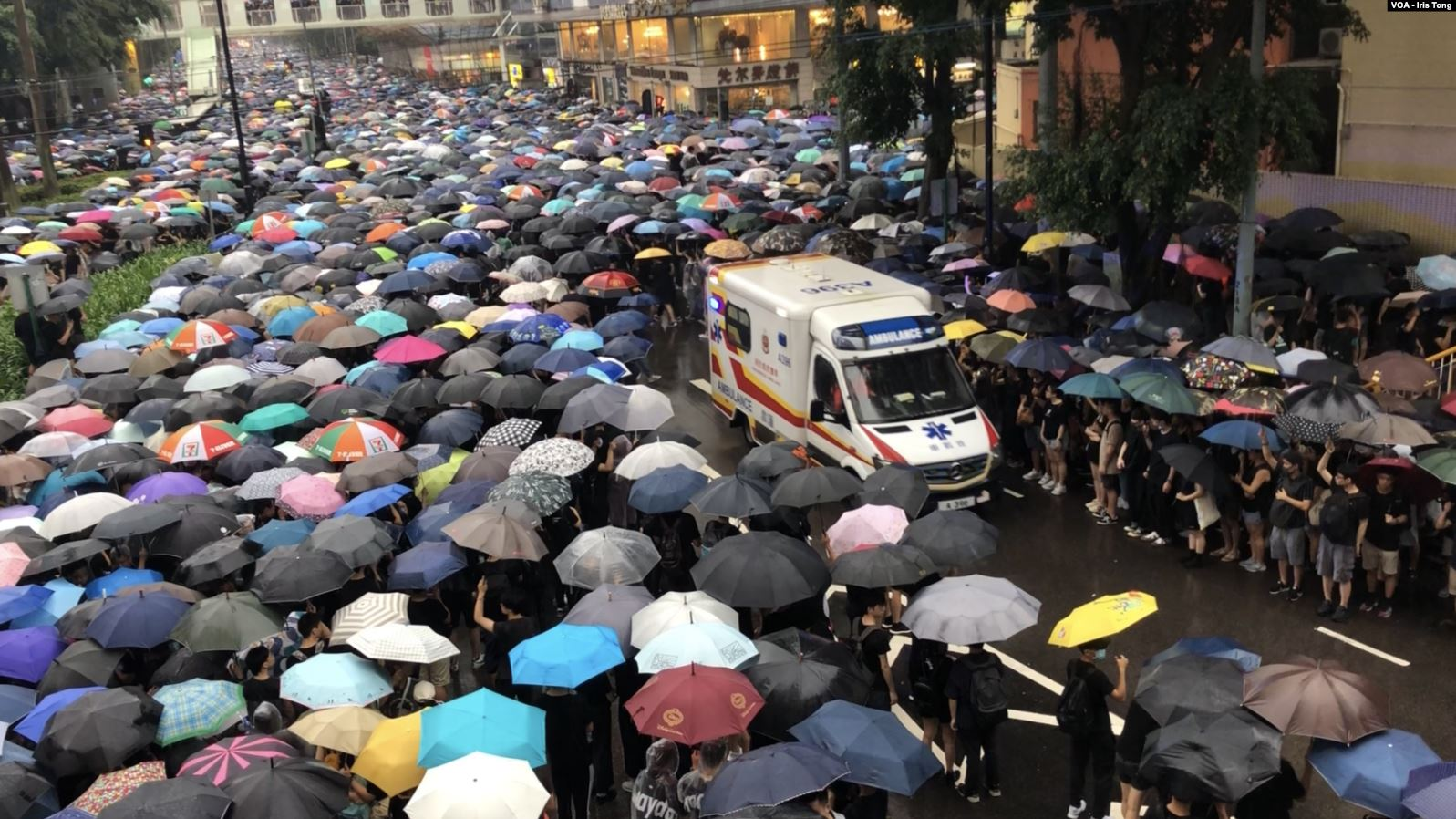
Hong Kong anti-extradition bill protesters with umbrellas make way for an ambulance, 2019

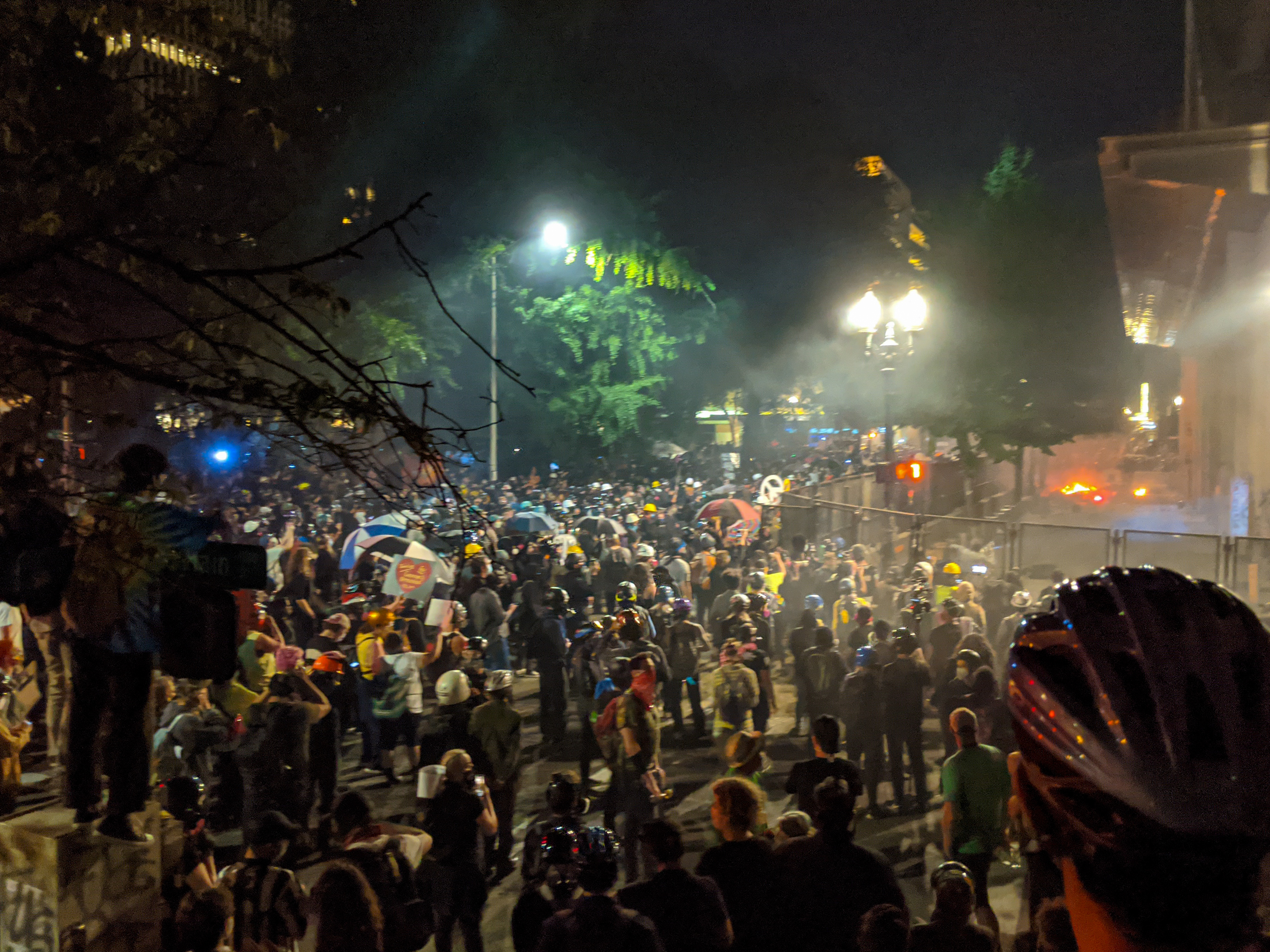
US George Floyd protesters in Portland using umbrellas, 2020

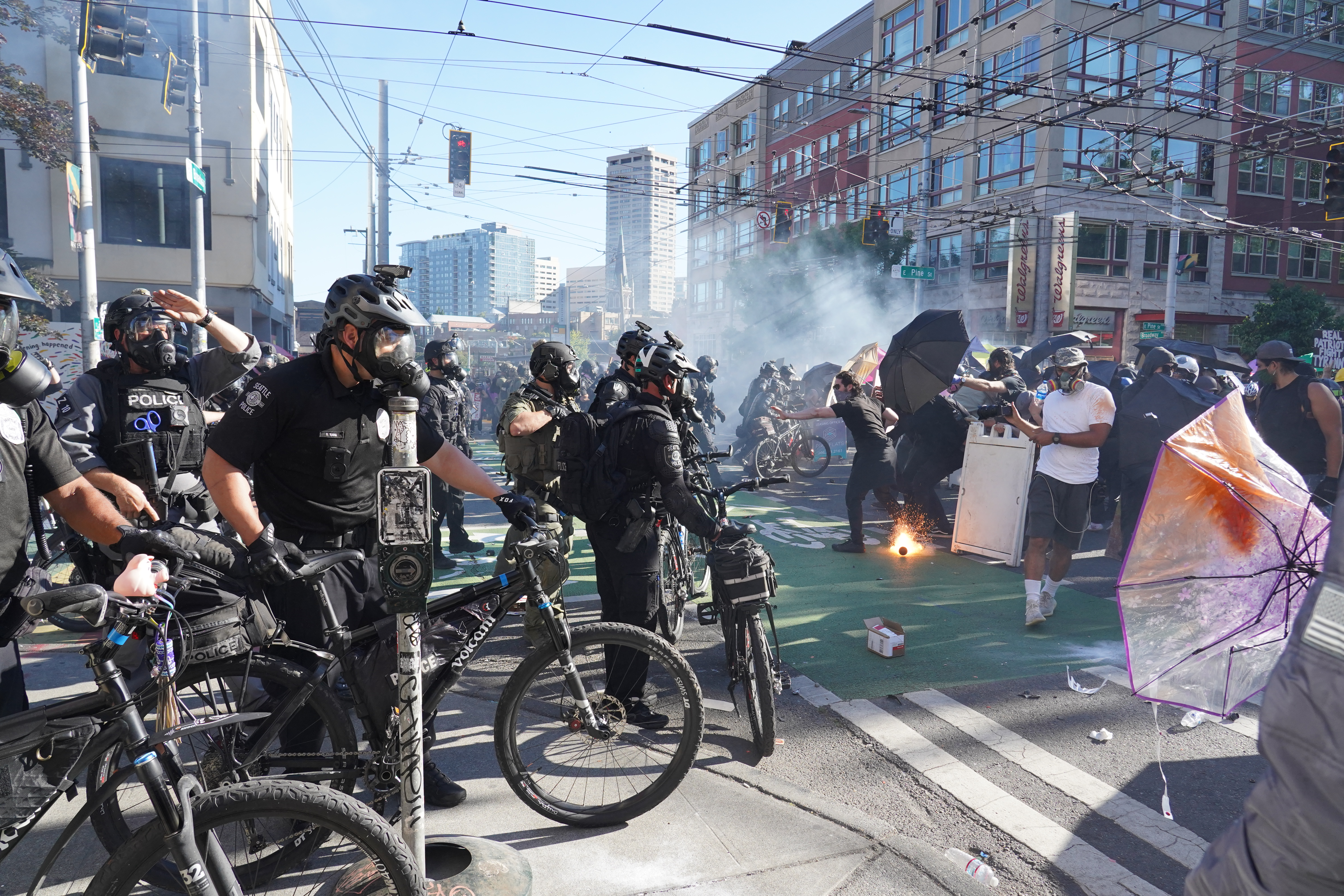
US George Floyd protesters in Seattle using umbrellas, 2020

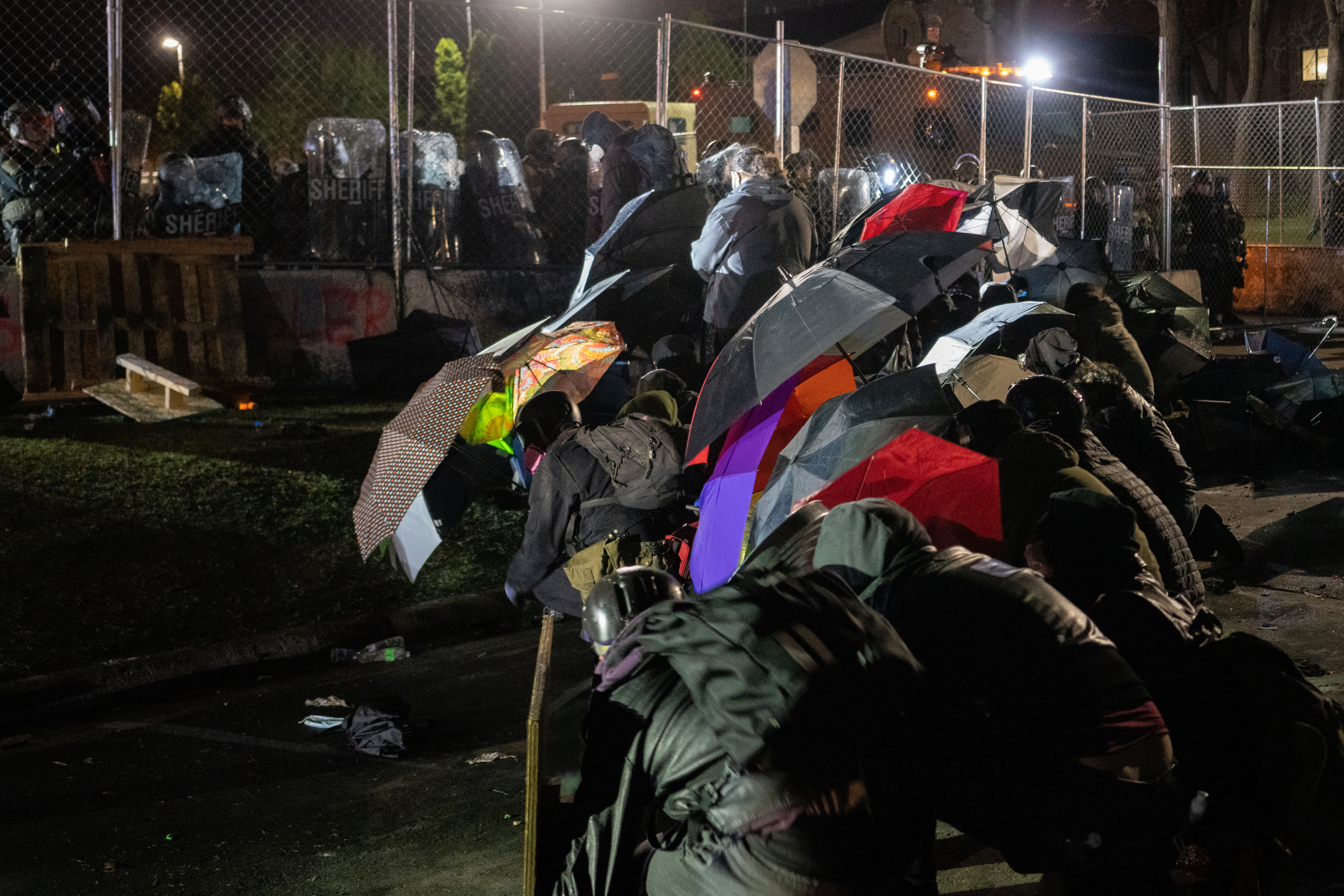
US George Floyd protesters in Minnesota using umbrellas, 2021

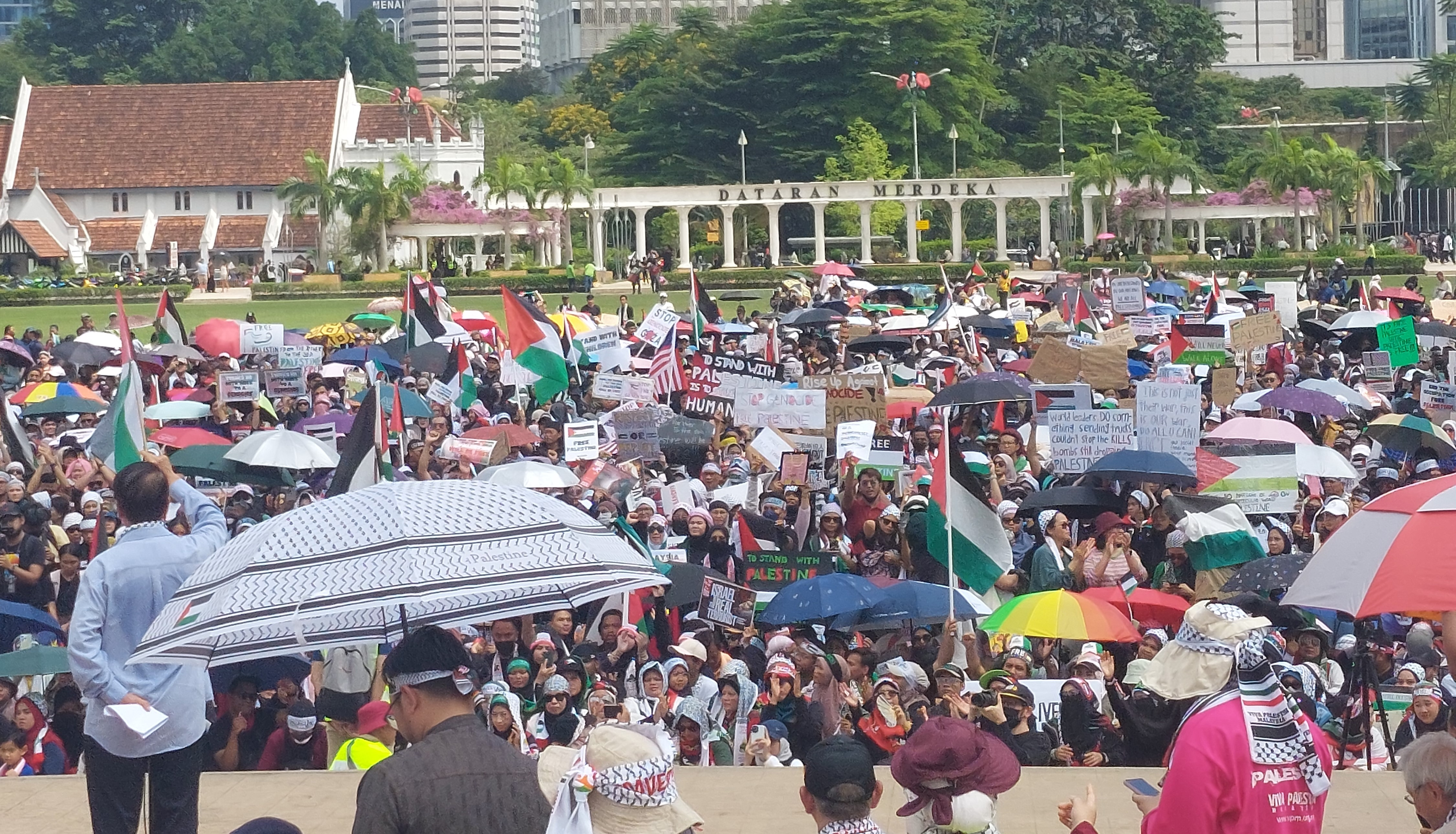
Malaysian Gaza war protesters with umbrellas, 2023

== See also ==
- 2019–20 Hong Kong protests
- Hong Kong 1 July march in 2003
- Sunflower Student Movement – 2014 protest movement in Taiwan
