= Zhang Junsheng =

Chinese engineer

- 张浚生
- Born: 1 July 1936; Changting County, Fujian, China
- Died: 19 February 2018 (aged 81); Hangzhou, Zhejiang, China
- Education: Zhejiang University
- Occupations: Optical engineer, politician, and academic administrator
- Known for: PRC spokesman during the transfer of sovereignty over Hong Kong
- Political party: Chinese Communist Party
- Spouses: Yang Huiyi (杨惠仪)

Chinese name
- Traditional Chinese: 張浚生
- Simplified Chinese: 张浚生
Transcriptions
Standard Mandarin
- Hanyu Pinyin: Zhāng Jùnshēng
- Wade–Giles: Chang Chün-sheng

Zhang Junsheng (simplified Chinese: 张浚生; traditional Chinese: 張浚生; 1 July 1936 – 19 February 2018) was a Chinese optical engineer, politician, and academic administrator. He spent 25 years as an engineering professor at Zhejiang University and won two national science and technology awards, before entering politics and being sent to Hong Kong in 1985 to prepare for the British colony's return to China. During his tenure as Beijing's chief spokesman in Hong Kong, he fiercely clashed with Chris Patten, the last British governor in Hong Kong, over the latter's effort to implement political reforms over Beijing's objection. Their public dispute dominated news headlines in Hong Kong. After the transfer of sovereignty over Hong Kong on 1 July 1997, Zhang returned to Zhejiang University to serve as its Party Secretary. He oversaw the school's merger with three other universities and used his Hong Kong connections to raise funds for the university.

== Early life and scientific career ==
Zhang was born in 1936 in Changting County, Fujian Province. After graduating from high school in 1954, he was admitted to Zhejiang University (ZJU) in Hangzhou, where he studied optical engineering. At the university he met his future wife Yang Huiyi (杨惠仪), a student from Shanghai. He joined the Chinese Communist Party in 1956, and was hired by the university as a faculty member after his graduation in 1958.

In the 1960s, he and his colleagues designed a solar telescope. After the delay caused by the Cultural Revolution, it was put into production in the 1970s and won a National Science and Technology Prize (second class) in 1982. He co-founded the laser program at Zhejiang University in 1973 and won another National Science and Technology Prize (second class) for a solar spectrometer, for which he designed the mechanical components. He was promoted to party secretary of ZJU's Optical Engineering Department in 1978.

== Career in Hong Kong ==
In 1983, Zhang was appointed deputy party secretary of Hangzhou, beginning his political career. After the signing of the Sino-British Joint Declaration in 1984, which announced that Great Britain would transfer sovereignty over Hong Kong to China on 1 July 1997, Zhang was assigned to the Hong Kong branch of the Xinhua News Agency, the de facto Chinese embassy in British Hong Kong, to work for the preparation of the handover. He served as deputy director, then director of the Hong Kong branch's publicity department, before being promoted to deputy director and spokesman of the branch in 1988.

When Chris Patten, the last British governor of Hong Kong, attempted to implement political reforms prior to the handover, Zhang publicly feuded with Patten, and their dispute dominated news headlines in Hong Kong. Zhang accused Patten of violating the Sino-British agreement and called him "a prostitute who still wanted an arch to be erected to honour her as a chaste woman".

== Career in Zhejiang ==
After attending the Hong Kong handover ceremony on 1 July 1997, Zhang returned to Hangzhou. He was appointed Party Secretary of Zhejiang University and oversaw the merger of Hangzhou University, Zhejiang Agricultural University and Zhejiang Medical University into ZJU. He hired the famous writer Jin Yong as president of ZJU's Institute of Humanities, and used his connections to solicit major donations from Hong Kong businesspeople such as Run Run Shaw and Tin Ka Ping. In 2005, a number of alumni and other donors established the "Junsheng Scholarship" in his honour to sponsor students from poor families. As of 2018, the scholarship had a fund of 30 million yuan and had supported more than 2,300 students. He also taught as a part-time professor at Sun Yat-sen University, Communication University of China, in addition to Zhejiang University.

== Views on democracy ==
During the Tiananmen Square protests of 1989, Zhang was sympathetic toward the pro-democracy students. He reportedly gave the go-ahead for the Wen Wei Po, Beijing's mouthpiece in Hong Kong, to publish an editorial with only four words: "deep grief" and "bitter hatred" after the government crackdown, but survived the ensuing purge of officials who supported political reform.

On the other hand, Zhang was critical of the localism movement in Hong Kong. He said the localist activists were too young to understand the history of the Basic Law, Hong Kong's mini-constitution, and advocated "national education" for students in Hong Kong. He dismissed the Occupy Central with Love and Peace movement in 2014 and criticized its pro-democracy leaders for having "never done anything good for Hong Kong".

== Death ==
On 19 February 2018, Zhang died in Hangzhou from cardiac arrest, at the age of 81. Hong Kong chief executive Carrie Lam expressed her sadness and praised Zhang's contributions to the establishment of the Hong Kong special administrative region. Chris Patten also gave his condolences. The South China Morning Post, Hong Kong's major English-language newspaper, published an editorial calling Zhang "a good friend" of Hong Kong who "always had the city’s best interests at heart". Pro-establishment Hong Kong lawmakers Chan Yuen-han and Tam Yiu-chung praised Zhang as "learned", "open to different perspectives", and principled, whereas Cheung Man-kwong, former lawmaker of the Democratic Party, said "Zhang, representing Beijing, made very stern criticisms against the pan-democrats."
