= Occupy Central with Love and Peace =

2013–2014 Hong Kong movement for universal suffrage

- 讓愛與和平佔領中環
- Abbreviation: OCLP (和平佔中)
- Established: 27 March 2013
- Dissolved: 3 December 2014
- Purpose: The election of the Chief Executive of Hong Kong beginning in 2017 by universal suffrage consistent with accepted international standards.
- Location: Hong Kong
- Key people: The Occupy Central trio: Rev. Chu Yiu-ming; Benny Tai; Chan Kin-man
- Website: oclp.hk

Occupy Central with Love and Peace
- Traditional Chinese: 讓愛與和平佔領中環
- Simplified Chinese: 让爱与和平占领中环
Transcriptions
Standard Mandarin
- Hanyu Pinyin: Ràng Ài Yǔ Hépíng Zhànglīng Zhōnghuán
Hakka
- Romanization: Ngiong^{4} Oi^{4} Yi^{4} Fo^{2}pin^{4} Zam^{4}liang^{1} Zung^{1}van^{2}
Yue: Cantonese
- Yale Romanization: Yeuhng oi yúh wòh pìhng jim líhng jūng wàahn
- Jyutping: Joeng^{6} Oi^{3} Jyu^{5} Wo^{4}ping^{4} Zim^{3}ling^{5} Zung^{1}waan^{4}

Alternative Chinese name
- Traditional Chinese: 和平佔中
- Simplified Chinese: 和平占中
Transcriptions
Standard Mandarin
- Hanyu Pinyin: Hépíng Zhàngzhōng
Yue: Cantonese
- Yale Romanization: Wòh pìhng jim jūng
- Jyutping: Wo^{4}ping^{4}Zim^{3}zung^{1}

Occupy Central with Love and Peace (OCLP) was a single-purpose Hong Kong civil disobedience campaign initiated by Reverend Chu Yiu-ming, Benny Tai and Chan Kin-man on 27 March 2013. The campaign was launched on 24 September 2014, partially leading to the 2014 Hong Kong protests. According to its manifesto, the campaign advocates for an electoral system in Hong Kong that is decided through a democratic process and satisfies international standards of universal and equal suffrage. With the first three stages of the movement – dialogue, deliberation and citizens' authorization – the civil disobedience that follows must be non-violent.

The campaign called for occupation of Hong Kong's central business district, Central, if the amendments were not made. Upstaged by the Hong Kong Federation of Students (HKFS) and Scholarism in September 2014, its leaders joined in the Occupy Central protests.

OCLP had originally planned to launch its protest campaign on 1 October 2014, the National Day of the People's Republic of China. OCLP stated that the ongoing protest was "the Umbrella Movement, not 'Occupy Central'" and referred to themselves as supporters rather than organisers. OCLP was disbanded by the founders when they surrendered to the police in December 2014.

== Background ==
Election of the Chief Executive of Hong Kong and seats in the Legislative Council by universal suffrage is established in the Hong Kong Basic Law (see Hong Kong Basic Law Article 45).

The chief executive of the Hong Kong Special Administrative Region shall be selected by election or through consultations held locally and be appointed by the Central People's Government.

The method for selecting the chief executive shall be specified in the light of the actual situation in the Hong Kong Special Administrative Region and in accordance with the principle of gradual and orderly progress. The ultimate aim is the selection of the Chief Executive by universal suffrage upon nomination by a broadly representative nominating committee in accordance with democratic procedures.

In December 2007, the National People's Congress Law Committee officially ruled on the issue of universal suffrage in Hong Kong:

that the election of the fifth chief executive of the Hong Kong Special Administrative Region in the year 2017 may be implemented by the method of universal suffrage; that after the chief executive is selected by universal suffrage, the election of the Legislative Council of the Hong Kong Special Administrative Region may be implemented by the method of electing all the members by universal suffrage...

The Asia Times wrote in 2008 that both proposals for the Legislative Council (LegCo) and for the chief executive were "hedged in with so many ifs and buts that there is no guarantee of Hong Kong getting anything at all... "

After another six years of government inaction, on 16 January 2013, Benny Tai, then an associate professor of law at the University of Hong Kong, published an article in the Hong Kong Economic Journal in which he proposed an act of civil disobedience be carried out in Central, the business and financial centre of Hong Kong if the government failed to announce reforms introducing genuine universal suffrage. He set no specific timetable for such action.

Reflecting increased polarisation, disaffection and frustration with government inaction and Beijing intransigence, on 21 March 2013, all 27 democratically inclined lawmakers of the Legislative Council joined in establishing the Alliance for True Democracy, adopting a more determined and confrontational stance than its recently failed and disbanded compromise-leaning predecessor, the Alliance for Universal Suffrage.

On 24 March 2013, Qiao Xiaoyang, then chairman of the Law Committee under the National People's Congress Standing Committee (NPCSC) startled Hongkongers by announcing that Chief Executive candidates must be persons who love the country and love Hong Kong, and who do not insist on confronting the central government. The statement was taken as setting out new, vague pre-conditions for candidacy as a means of screening out candidates not sympathetic to Beijing's goals in Hong Kong, denying the promise of genuine democracy. OCLP was convened three days later.

== Formation ==
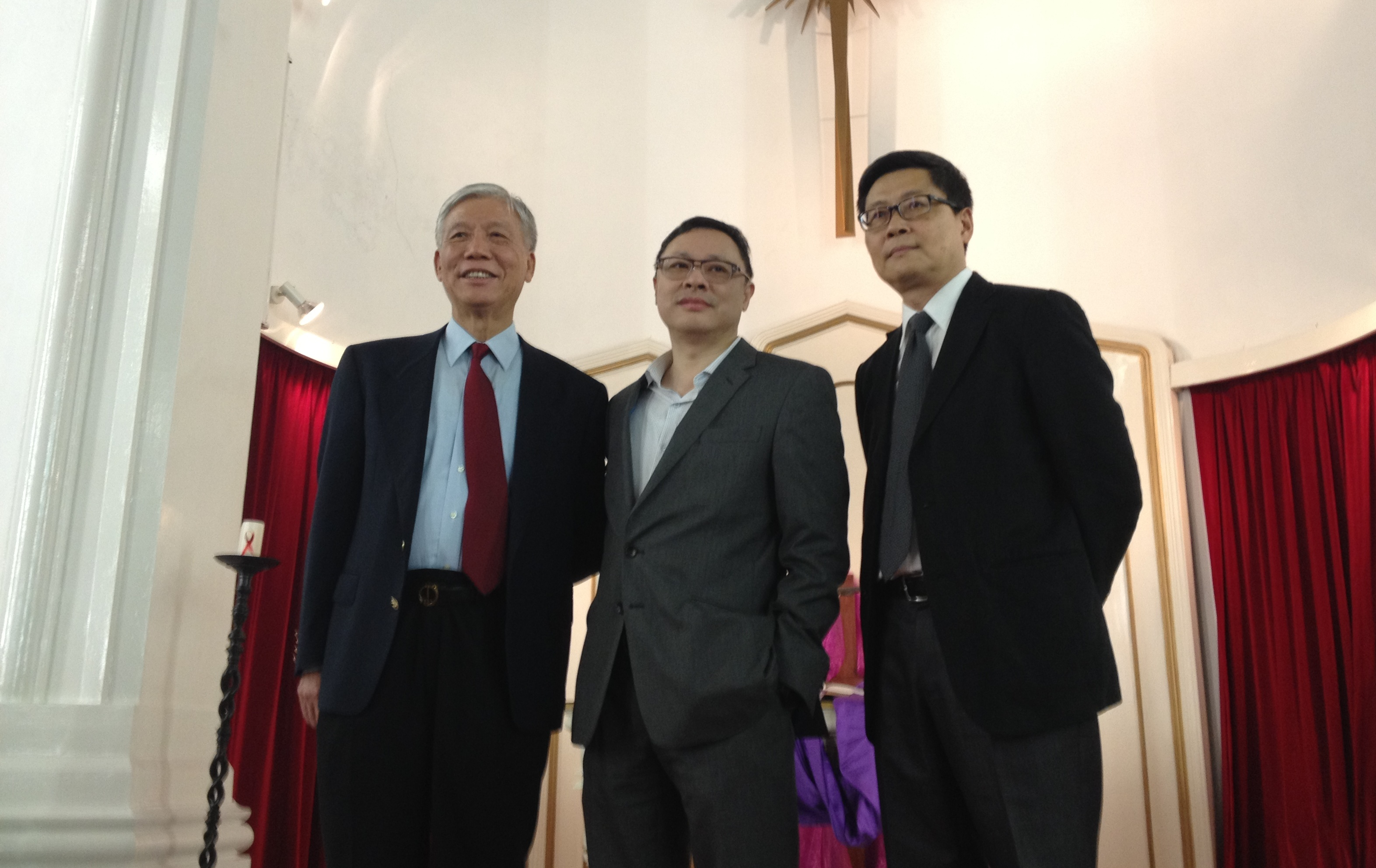
Authors of the campaign (L-R) Chu, Tai and Chan (27 March 2013)

On 16 January 2013, an article by Benny Tai Yiu-ting was published in the Hong Kong Economic Journal, entitled 公民抗命的最大殺傷力武器 (Civil Disobedience's Deadliest Weapon). Tai postulated a seven-step progression: 10,000 participants signing a declaration (taking a vow and pledge of willingness to occupy the streets), live TV broadcast of discussions, electronic voting on methods for universal suffrage, a referendum on the preferred formula, resignation of Super-Seat Legislative Council member (then former Democratic Party Chairman Albert Ho Chun-yan) to be filled in a by-election to be seen as a referendum on the plan, civil disobedience, and, finally, Occupy Central in July 2014. Tai repeated his plan at a forum held on 24 February 2013, emphasising the importance of the non-violence pledge.

In an interview together with Ho on 6 March 2013, Tai spoke at length about his referendum and protest strategies to bring about universal suffrage in Hong Kong and stated: "This is a people's movement; frankly speaking, the central government will have to accept [the referendum result] or reject it; if they reject it, we will block the streets."

OCLP was launched at a press conference hosted by its three founders, Reverend Chu Yiu-ming, Benny Tai Yiu-ting, and Chan Kin-man, on 27 March 2013 at which they presented its manifesto.

== Objectives ==
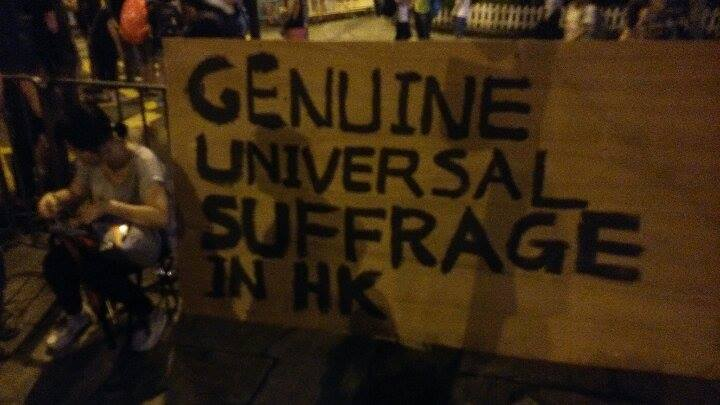
Hong Kong protest banner

OCLP's manifesto stated that it would campaign for universal suffrage through dialogue, deliberation, civil referendum and civil disobedience (Occupy Central); it also demanded that any government proposal should satisfy international standards in relation to universal suffrage, i.e. equal number of votes, equal weight for each vote and no unreasonable restrictions on the right to stand for election, and that the final proposal for electoral reform be decided by means of a genuine democratic process. The founders emphasised their objective of non-violent civil disobedience but, as their campaign had no leaders nor membership, what acts members of the public adopted was a matter for them to decide as individuals.

== Democratic Party support ==
On 5 February 2014, the Democratic Party staged a public oath-taking, at Statue Square, with members swearing to join in Occupy Central irrespective of the risk of arrest and imprisonment. Members of People Power, disparaging of the Democratic Party's failure to demand direct civil nomination of Chief Executive candidates in its platform, disrupted the ceremony.

== Deliberations on reform ==
Deliberation days were organised by OCLP on 9 June 2013, 9 March 2014, and 6 May 2014, at which attendees were invited to exchange views on strategies to be adopted to achieve democratic reform.

On the third deliberation day, the Occupy Central participants voted on electoral reform proposals put forward by various pro-democracy groups, with the objective of determining which should be put to a plebiscite. Five proposals were put to the attendees and the three most popular selected. The proposal by student groups Scholarism and Hong Kong Federation of Students which allowed for public nomination, received 1,124 votes – 45 percent of the vote. People Power's proposal came in second with 685 votes, while the three-track proposal by the Alliance for True Democracy consisting of 27 pan-democracy lawmakers got 445 votes. The civil recommendation method proposed by 18 academics got 74 votes and Hong Kong 2020's proposal came in last with 43 votes. A total of 2,508 votes were cast in the poll.

All three selected proposals included the concept of civil nomination, which the mainland authorities had already flatly rejected as not compliant with the Basic Law. The three chosen proposals were thus considered to be the more radical, leaving moderate pan-democrats in the cold, laying the ground for friction and division among democrats. The League of Social Democrats and People Power lawmakers, notwithstanding their common membership in the Alliance for True Democracy, had urged their supporters to vote against the Alliance. Snubbed Civic Party lawmaker Ronny Tong Ka-wah, who had seen his moderate plan soundly marginalised in the poll believed "the Occupy Central movement has been hijacked by radicals". He believed that the poll results would make it harder to find a reform package agreeable to Beijing. He thought Occupy Central's plan to block streets in Central was likely to materialise.

== Civic referendum ==
Civil Referendum
- 20 – 29 June 2014
- Voting system: Majority voting

For CE Election 2017, I support OCLP to submit this proposal to the Government:
Alliance for True Democracy proposal	42.1%
Students proposal	38.4%
People Power proposal	10.4%
Abstention	8.9%

If the government proposal cannot satisfy international standards allowing genuine choices by electors, LegCo should veto it, my stance is:
LegCo should veto	87.8%
LegCo should not veto	7.5%
Abstention	4%

OCLP commissioned the University of Hong Kong Public Opinion Programme (HKUPOP) to run a poll on three proposals – all of which involved allowing citizens to directly nominate candidates – for presentation to the Beijing government. It ran from 20 to 29 June 2014. A total of 792,808 people, equivalent to over one fifth of the registered electorate, took part in the poll by either voting online or going to designated polling stations.

The proposal tabled by the Alliance for True Democracy, a group comprising 26 of the 27 pan-democratic lawmakers, won the unofficial referendum by securing 331,427 votes, or 42.1 per cent of the 787,767 valid ballots. A joint blueprint put forward by Scholarism and the Hong Kong Federation of Students came second with 302,567 votes (38.4 per cent), followed by the People Power proposal, which garnered 81,588 votes (10.4 per cent). All three called for the public to be allowed to nominate candidates for the 2017 Chief Executive election, an idea repeatedly dismissed by Beijing as inconsistent with the Basic Law. The Alliance's provided for nomination by the election committee and by political parties, as well. The plan was not specific on method of formation of the nominating committee, only stating that it should be "as democratic as it can be". The two other proposals were for nomination by the public and nominating committee only. 691,972 voters (87.8 per cent) agreed that the Legislative Council should veto any reform proposal put forward by the government if it failed to meet international standards, compared with 7.5 per cent who disagreed.

The unofficial referendum infuriated Beijing. Mainland officials and newspapers called it "illegal" while many condemned Occupy Central, claiming it was operating at the behest of foreign "anti-China forces" and would damage Hong Kong's standing as a financial capital. Zhang Junsheng, a former deputy director of Xinhua News Agency in Hong Kong, denounced the poll as "meaningless". The state-run Global Times mocked the referendum as an "illegal farce" and a "joke". The region's chief executive, Leung Chun-ying, offered this rebuke: "Nobody should place Hong Kong people in confrontation with mainland Chinese citizens." Mainland censors meanwhile scrubbed social media sites clean of references to Occupy Central. The poll also prompted a flurry of vitriolic editorials, preparatory police exercises and sophisticated cyber-attacks where strategies evolved over time. According to CloudFlare, a firm that helped defend against a "unique and sophisticated" attack, the volume of traffic was an unprecedented 500 Gbit/s and involved at least five botnets. OCLP's servers were bombarded with in excess of 250 million DNS requests per second, equivalent to the average volume of legitimate DNS requests for the entire Internet.

Before the referendum, the State Council issued a white paper claiming "comprehensive jurisdiction" over the territory. "The high degree of autonomy of the HKSAR [Hong Kong Special Administrative Region] is not full autonomy, nor a decentralised power," it said. "It is the power to run local affairs as authorised by the central leadership." Michael DeGolyer, director of the transition project at Hong Kong Baptist University, said: "It's very clear from surveys that the vast majority of the people voting in this referendum are doing it as a reaction to this white paper – particularly because they see it as threatening the rule of law ... That's not negotiating on the one country two systems principle, that's demolishing it."

== Criminal liability for OCLP protesters ==
The OCLP has pointed out the participants in Occupy Central could be guilty of "obstructing, inconveniencing or endangering a person or vehicle in a public place" under the Summary Offenses Ordinance. However, under the Public Order Ordinance, Occupy Central was considered as unlawful assembly, i.e., "when three or more people assemble... to cause any person reasonably to fear that the persons so assembled will commit a breach of the peace or will by such conduct provoke other persons to commit a breach of the peace, they are an unlawful assembly." The Hong Kong Secretary for Security Lai Tung-kwok stated that the government will "take robust action to uphold the rule of law and maintain safety and order."

OCLP also published a "manual of disobedience" to inform protesters what to do in the event of being detained.

== Reactions to formation and objective ==
=== SAR government ===
On 21 March 2013, in an apparent response to reports of Tai's statements early that month and the formation that day of the Alliance for True Democracy, Commissioner of Police Andy Tsang Wai-hung said that any attempt to block major thoroughfares in Central would not be tolerated and warned people to think twice about joining the Occupy Central protest.

In June 2014, with pressure building in view of the original plan for July 2014 occupy action, Chief Executive Leung Chun-ying warned that the Occupy Central movement was bound to be neither peaceful nor legal and that actions will be taken to maintain law and order and Secretary for Security Lai Tung-kwok warned that radical elements of Occupy Central may cause serious disturbances like the violent incident at the Legislative Council during the meeting for funding the northeast New Territories new town. Lai reminded the participants to consider their own personal safety and legal liability.

=== PRC government ===
==== Officials' response ====
On 24 March 2013, Wang Guangya, director of the Hong Kong and Macau Affairs Office, when asked if he believed the Occupy Central plan would be beneficial to the city, said "I think Hong Kong compatriots don't want to see Hong Kong being messed up. Hong Kong needs development." At the same time, Qiao Xiaoyang, chairman of the National People's Congress Law Committee, was quoted as accusing the "opposition camp" of "fuelling" the Occupy Central plan. Qiao said the plan was only "partly truthful", "complex" and a "risk-everything" proposition.

==== Censorship ====
The Occupy Central campaign was censored from mainland China news media and replaced by reports of government supporters gathering near the Tamar government headquarters to endorse the central government's plan. Users of the mainland-controlled messaging application WeChat observed that Occupy Central content sent by them was filtered out of their messages as viewed by their addressees. Social media such as Weibo came under never-before-seen levels of censorship. Usually accessible Instagram was blocked entirely.

=== Pro-democracy camp ===
In February 2013, Civic Party lawmaker Kwok Ka-ki said he saw the ideas as "the last resort" to pressure Beijing and the SAR administration to introduce universal suffrage. "If Beijing breaks its promise of universal suffrage," he added, "we will have no option but to launch such a civil disobedience movement."

Albert Ho Chun-yan of the Democratic Party undertook to resign his legislator post to enforce a de facto referendum on universal suffrage just as the pan-democrats had done by triggering the by-election in 2010.

Not all democrats' reactions were supportive. Wong Yeung-tat, of Civic Passion, for example, was strongly opposed to the movement.

=== Pro-Beijing camp ===
Cheung Kwok-kwan, vice-chairman of the pro-Beijing Democratic Alliance for the Betterment and Progress of Hong Kong, questioned whether Hong Kong could "afford the negative impact of people staging a rally to occupy and even paralyze Central for a universal suffrage model". He noted that it was "a mainstream idea" in the SAR not to resort to radical means to fight for democracy. Rita Fan Hsu Lai-tai, a National People's Congress Standing Committee member, feared the occupation would adversely affect Hong Kong's image. National People's Congress Deputy and Executive Councilor Fanny Law Fan Chiu-fan urged the opposition camp to show respect for each other through a rational and pragmatic debate over the issue. She added that there was no need to resort to "extreme action" and claimed that it was not too late to begin consultations in 2014.

==== Alliance for Peace and Democracy (APD) ====
In mid-July 2014, after the civic referendum, the APD, under its spokesman Robert Chow, initiated a petition against the occupation, with signatures to be gathered from 18 July to 17 August. There were criticisms that no identity checks were carried out and that there were no steps to prevent repeat signings. According to the Wall Street Journal and South China Morning Post, employees of corporations such as the major utility Towngas faced pressure to sign petition forms that were being circulated by their department heads. The APD claimed in excess of a million signatures were obtained. The organisers said they obtained signatures from many supporters including children, secondary school and university students, the elderly, office staff, celebrities and maids. Official endorsements were received from Chief Executive CY Leung and other top Hong Kong officials. The APD organised a "march for peace" on 17 August intended to undermine the Occupy movement. It was attended by tens of thousands of marchers including those bused in from mainland China by pro-establishment organisations including the Hong Kong Federation of Trade Unions. There were widespread claims that organisations had paid people to attend the rally or had given other inducements. and that busing had swelled numbers by some 20,000. An editorial in The Standard noted "it's obvious that Beijing spared no effort in maximizing the turnout... Beijing has demonstrated its ability to swiftly mobilize the masses over a relatively short period".

=== Business and professional groups ===
A meeting held in October 2013 between members of the Occupy Central movement and Taiwanese independence activists was met with condemnation by eight major local business groups. A statement to that effect was signed by the Hong Kong General Chamber of Commerce, the Chinese General Chamber of Commerce, the Federation of Hong Kong Industries, the Chinese Manufacturers' Association of Hong Kong and the Real Estate Developers Association of Hong Kong, among others.

In June 2014, Executives and brokers including tycoons Li Ka-shing and Peter Woo, and also the Hong Kong General Chamber of Commerce and the Hong Kong Bahrain Business Association, the Canadian, Indian and Italian chambers of commerce in Hong Kong together published an advertisement on newspapers that said the demonstrations may "cripple commerce in the city's central business district". The statement was directed at the "organisers of Occupy Central".

In late June 2014, Hong Kong's four biggest accounting firms issued a statement condemning the Occupy Central movement arguing that the blockade could have an "adverse and far-reaching impact" on the local legal system, social order and economic development. Employees of the firms who called themselves a "group of Big Four employees who love Hong Kong" took out an advertisement saying their employers' statement did not represent their stance.

=== Others ===
Cardinal Joseph Zen, the Roman Catholic leader in Hong Kong, gave his conditional support to the campaign, stating that it must have well-defined goals and deadlines. The incumbent bishop Cardinal John Tong Hon expressed that he did not encourage followers to join the movement, suggesting that both parties should debate universal suffrage through dialogue.

Reverend Ng Chung-man of the Protestant Evangelical Free Church of China publicly denounced the Occupy Central plan in his church's newsletter. Ng wrote that while "some Christians are advocating...occupying Central to force the governments to give in to their demands...civil disobedience is acceptable biblically only...when people's rights to religion and to live are under threat". He exhorted believers to pray for those in authority, in an act of "active subordination" to "relatively just governments".

== OCLP occupies ==
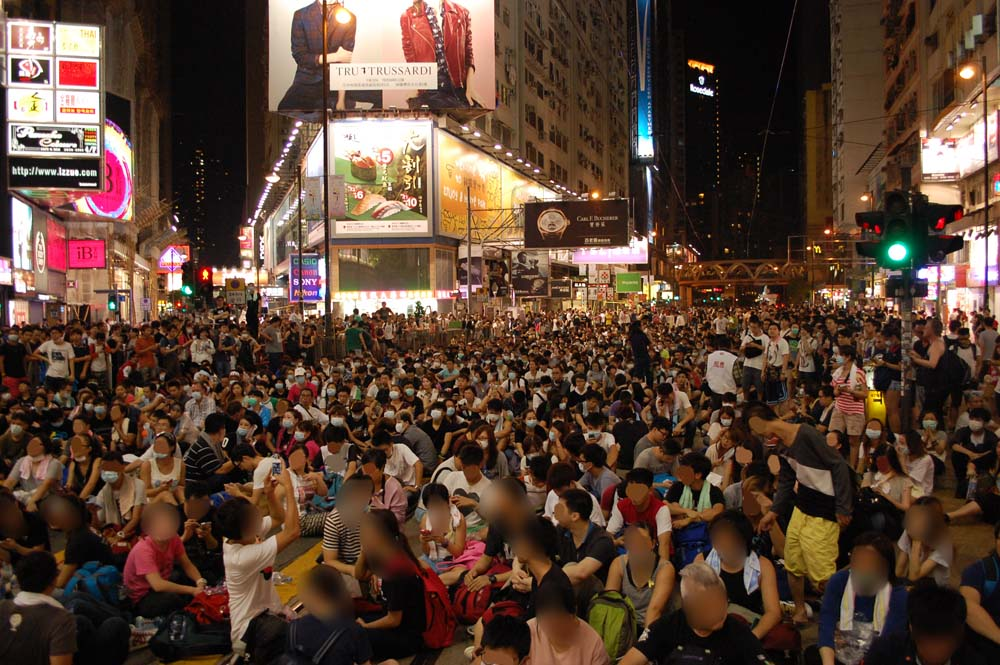
Protesters sit in Causeway Bay near midnight on 28 September

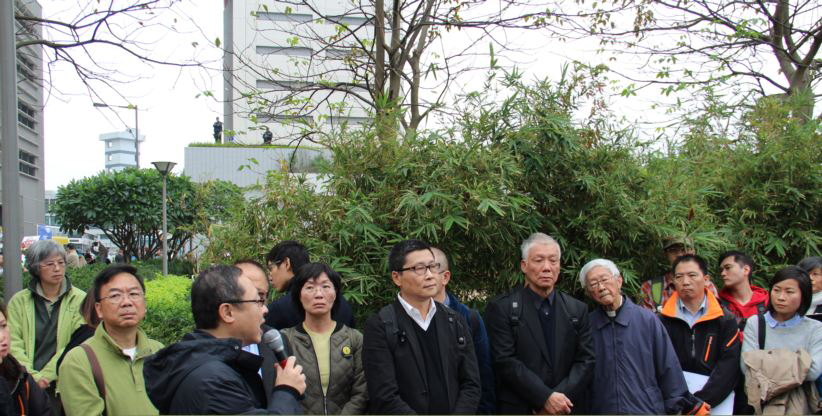
The trio and protesters, including former Roman Catholic Cardinal Joseph Zen (4th from right), surrender to police (3 December 2014)

On 26 September 2014, after the class boycott campaign, students led by members of the Hong Kong Federation of Students (HKFS) and Scholarism occupied Civic Square, triggering a crowd to protest in support outside the Central Government Offices in Admiralty. On 28 September 2014, at 1.40 am, Benny Tai announced the official start of the Occupy Central with Love and Peace civil disobedience campaign on the stage of the student protests. He proposed that the areas around the government headquarters be the occupation site in place of Central proper.

On Sunday night, 28 September 2014, the scenes in Central and Admiralty became more dramatic, as the police employed tear gas, pepper spray, and batons in their attempts to disperse the protesters. The use of tear gas was a significant move in Hong Kong, as it had not been used in the SAR since 2005 and, on that occasion, in the highly exceptional situation of quelling violent Korean farmers bent on disrupting a WTO conference. The excessive use of force by Hong Kong Police in dispersing Hongkongers antagonised and frustrated the general public and did not deter the protesters; rather, it gave impetus to thousands more to begin occupation of other major thoroughfares of Hong Kong, namely, at Mong Kok and Causeway Bay. On Monday, the government withdrew the riot police, leaving the three regions occupied by protesters, and there were massive traffic disruptions as all traffic had to be diverted.

== OCLP bows out ==
The scale and scope of the three main occupations was unprecedented, involving many pressure groups as well as many citizens not associated with any group at all. What had been formulated by the OCLP organisers was now much bigger than OCLP and completely beyond their or any single group's control. Hence, the role of OCLP's volunteers was to provide support, for example, through its legal support team, for what had become a major, yet amorphous, movement.

Moreover, although the movement initially gained broad support from the public, support started to wane around the third week of occupation as people became tired of the inconveniences to daily life.

As the occupation ended its first month, Chan Kin-man and Benny Tai resumed their teaching duties at their respective universities and OCLP handed over the command of its medic, marshal and supplies teams to the student groups.

On 3 December 2014, the Occupy Central trio, along with 62 others including Democratic Party lawmaker Wu Chi-wai and Cardinal Joseph Zen, then Bishop Emeritus of Hong Kong, turned themselves in to the police, admitting taking part in an unauthorised assembly. The police declined to arrest them and no charges were laid at the time. According to the trio, they did so in order to bear legal responsibility and uphold the rule of law, as well as to affirm their principles of love and peace. OCLP was disbanded by the founders upon surrendering to the police. They also urged occupiers to leave for their own safety, citing their fear that the government use the police to stamp its authority on them. The OCLP leaders planned to pursue their cause through community work and education.

== Timeline ==
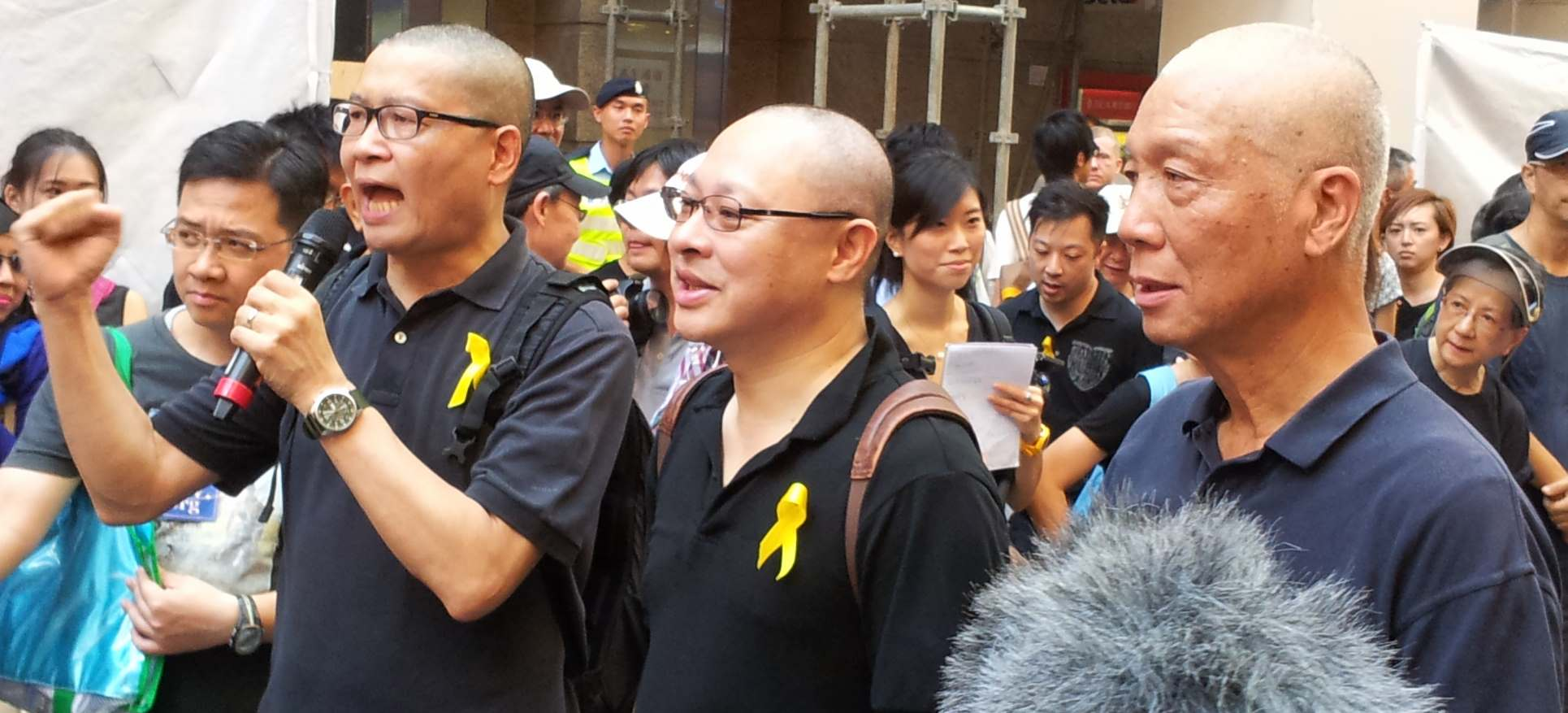
Chan, Tai & Chu lead first OCLP-linked march (Black Banner protest), 14 September 2014

- 16 January 2013 – Benny Tai Yiu-ting writes an article 公民抗命的最大殺傷力武器 (Civil disobedience's deadliest weapon) in Hong Kong Economic Journal suggesting an occupation of Central.
- 24 March 2013 – Qiao Xiaoyang's "love the country and love Hong Kong" statement
- 27 March 2013 – "Occupy Central with Love and Peace" (OCLP) is formed
- 9 June 2013 – First Deliberation Day
- 9 March 2014 – Second Deliberation Day
- 6 May 2014 – Third Deliberation Day
- 20 to 29 June 2014 – Civil referendum. The civil referendum ends with 787,767 valid e-votes, or about 22% of Hong Kong's registered voters.
- 2 July 2014 – Over 500 protesters arrested for unlawful arrest at overnight sit-in after biggest 1 July march for a decade
- 31 August 2014 – NPCSC announces its decision for Hong Kong's electoral systems in 2017. OCLP plans civil disobedience protests.
- 14 September 2014 – "Black Clock" march
- 22 to 26 September 2014 – Students' strike.
- 27 September 2014 – Protests outside Central Government Complex.
- 28 September 2014
  - Early hours – Benny Tai announces that Occupy Central is launched.
  - Dusk – The police use pepper spray, tear gas and batons to disperse protesters near Tamar Park, as protests begin to occupy Admiralty.
  - Night – Thousands of protesters occupy part of Causeway Bay and part of Mong Kok.
- 29 September 2014 – Riot police have retreated from various areas.
- 28 October 2014 – Chan Kin-man and Benny Tai returned to their teaching duties.
- 25 November 2014 – The Mong Kok protest site was cleared by the police after heavy clashes with the protesters.
- 3 December 2014 – The Occupy Trio surrendered to the police without being arrested.
- 8 December 2014 – The court granted an injunction to a bus company to remove the blockades in Admiralty.
- 12 December 2014 – The occupied site in Admiralty is cleared without resistance.
- 15 December 2014 – The last occupied zone in Causeway Bay was cleared peacefully. Protesters also leave the Legislative Council demonstration area. Police announce that 955 people have been arrested throughout the occupation and 75 had turned themselves in. The occupation ends.

== See also ==
- 2019–20 Hong Kong protests
- Umbrella Movement
