= Chan Kin-man =

Hong Kong academic and activist (born 1959)

- 陳健民
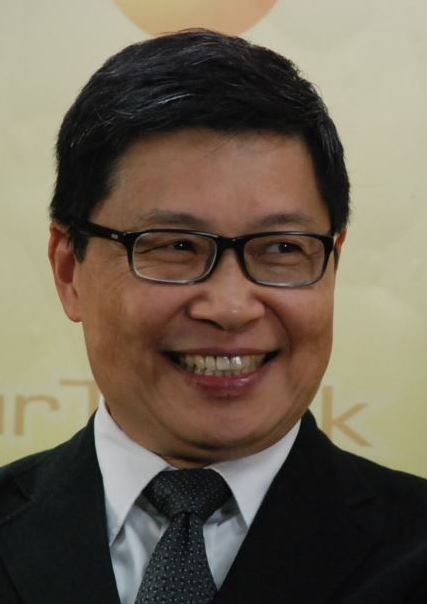
- Chan Kin-man in 2014
- Born: March 9, 1959 (age 67); Hong Kong
- Occupation: Academic
- Known for: Co-founder of Occupy Central with Love and Peace

Academic background
- Education: Concordia Lutheran School
- Alma mater: Chung Chi College, CUHK (BSS); Yale University (MA, MPhil, PhD)
- Doctoral advisor: Juan José Linz; Deborah S. Davis

Academic work
- Institutions: Chinese University of Hong Kong (1993–2008); National Chengchi University (2021–)
- Main interests: Civil society, Democracy

Chan Kin-man
- Traditional Chinese: 陳健民
- Simplified Chinese: 陈健民
Transcriptions
Standard Mandarin
- Hanyu Pinyin: Chén Jiànmín
Yue: Cantonese
- Jyutping: can4 gin6 man4

Chan Kin-man (Chinese: 陳健民, born 9 March 1959) is a former associate professor of sociology at the Chinese University of Hong Kong. He is one of the founders of the Occupy Central with Love and Peace campaign that strove for universal suffrage for the Hong Kong Chief Executive Election in 2017. In 1993, Chen began teaching at the Department of Sociology at CUHK, and retired in 2019.

Over the years in mainland China and Hong Kong, he has served various positions in the public services, and set up a number of non-governmental organizations. He is currently the director of the Hong Kong Civil Education Foundation and member of the executive committee of the Hong Kong Democratic Development Network. In March 2013, Chan, together with Benny Tai and Chu Yiu-ming, initiated the nonviolent civil disobedience campaign “Occupy Central with Love and Peace”, to call for universal suffrage in Hong Kong, which sowed the seeds for the now globally-known Umbrella Movement in 2014.

In 2019, Chan was sentenced to 16 months in prison for his role in the Umbrella Movement.

== Life and career ==
Chan graduated from Concordia Lutheran Middle School in 1979, and earned a degree of Bachelor of Social Science in Sociology of the Chinese University of Hong Kong in 1983, and Master of Arts, Master of Philosophy and Doctor of Philosophy in Sociology of Yale University in 1990, 1991 and 1995 respectively.

=== Early life ===
Chan was a member of Chung Chi College of the Chinese University of Hong Kong. He was actively involved in student movements, and served in the Student Union of the Chinese University of Hong Kong as the external secretary, alongside notable alumni Andy Ho On-tat and Ricky Wong Wai-kay. After graduating from university in 1983, Chan committed to community work to promote the rights of the marginalized.

In 1988, Chan received a scholarship to attend Yale University. He studied political Sociology and China studies under the supervision of political scientist Juan J. Linz and sociologist Deborah Davis. He completed his Master of Arts, Master of Philosophy and Doctor of Philosophy in Sociology at Yale in 1990, 1991 and 1995 respectively.

=== Teaching career ===
In 1993, Chan began teaching at the Sociology Department of the Chinese University of Hong Kong. He is now an associate professor of Sociology and lecturer in Liberal Studies at Shaw College. He was formerly the director of Hong Kong Institute of Asia-Pacific Studies and the director of the Centre for Civil Society Studies. Beyond CUHK, Chan had been a visiting professor, PhD supervisor and chair of the Institute for Civil Society at the Sun Yat-sen University in China, also a researcher at the National Chengchi University in Taiwan.

Chan has received multiple teaching awards from the Chinese University of Hong Kong, including the 1999-2000 Exemplary Teaching Award, 1997-1998 Most Popular Lecturer (Sociology Department), and 1995-1996 Best Lecturer (General Education and Elective Courses).

=== Media ===
Chan writes about Hong Kong's democracy issues in Hong Kong newspaper Ming Pao, and Civil Society, a magazine of the Sun Yat-sen University that concerns China's NGO environment. He used to be a guest host of the RTHK current affairs program. Chan was an independent non-executive directors of the Hong Kong Television Network Limited until July 2013.

== Participation in public affairs ==
During his early career, Chan focused on corruption issues in China. In recent years, his research focus has shifted to the development of Chinese civil society. He believes that improvements in China's governance can only take place if there is a balanced development of the government, economy and civil society.

He once made a statement in 2014: “While it is important to supervise and reform the systems of the chief executive and the legislature, yet more has to be done if we want to establish a real democratic system. A healthy democracy requires support from a strong civil society.”

=== Public participation ===
Chan has served as a member on the Community Research Sub-committee of the Independent Commission Against Corruption, and the Committee on Promoting Acceptance of People Living with HIV/AIDS of the Hong Kong Advisory Council on AIDS.

In 2002, he co-founded civil society group Hong Kong Democratic Development Network with the Reverend Chu Yiu-ming and others. He is the convener of the scholar committee of the Network.

=== Occupy Central with Love and Peace ===
On March 27, 2013, Chan, HKU law professor Benny Tai and the Reverend Chu Yiu-ming issued a public statement on “Occupy Central with Love and Peace,” announcing the start of the nonviolent campaign for universal suffrage rights in Hong Kong.

After the end of the Umbrella Movement, in February 2015, Chan said in an interview: “The younger generation understands the difference between genuine and fake universal suffrage, and the moral power of nonviolence, at the same time, their life energy evolved, and seek for more aggressive resistance. Not all of them agree with the principle of ‘love and peace’, when faced with the choice between civil disobedience and war games. They want radical structural changes, and not just a lesson on civic education. They want equality, mutual respect, being heard, dialogue, democracy, freedom and autonomy. They despise hegemony, corporate greed, bureaucracy, kitsch and selfishness. They believe that they will lose everything, if they make any sort of compromise.

A poll by the Chinese University of Hong Kong noted 80 percent of the young respondents want to see the implementation of universal suffrage as soon as possible, and as many as 62 percent of those aged between 15 and 24, supported the Umbrella Movement. The pro-government camp will not get what they want, and the real loser will be the government, because no one can destroy an entire generation."

In 2019, Chan was sentenced to 16 months in prison for his role in the Umbrella Movement. He served 11 months in prison.

== Research interests ==
1. Civil society
2. Political Sociology
3. Democracy
4. China Studies

== Academic publications ==
- 2015 “Occupying Hong Kong: How deliberation, referendum and civil disobedience played out in the Umbrella Movement." In International Journal on Human Rights.
- 2014 “Societal Support for China’s Grass-Roots NGOs: Evidence from Yunnan, Guangdong and Beijing." In The China Journal no. 71, pp. 65–90. (With Spires, Anthony J., Lin Tao)
- 2013 “An Overview of Social Enterprise Development in China and Hong Kong." In Journal of Ritsumelkan Social Sciences and Humanities vol.5 pp. 165–178. (With Yuen Yiu Kai Terence)
- 2013 “The Rise of Civil Society in China." In Towards a New Development Paradigm in Twenty-First Century China: Economy, Society and Politics ed. by Eric Florence, Pierre Defraigne. pp. 179–202.
- 2012 “Graduated Control and Beyond: The Evolving Government-NGO Relations." In China perspectives. No. 2012/3. pp. 9–17. (With Prof. Fengshi Wu)
- 2010 “Commentary on Hsu: Graduated Control and NGO Responses: Civil Society as Institutional Logic" in Journal of Civil Society Vol. 6, No. 3, 301–306.
- 2009 “Civil Society and Social Capital in China” in International Encyclopedia of Civil Society Pp 242 – 247. New York: Springer
- 2009 “Harmonious Society” in International Encyclopedia of Civil Society Pp 821 – 825. New York: Springer
- 2005. “Chinese NGOs Strive to Survive," In Social Transformation in Chinese Societies, Vol. 1, pp. 131–159.
- 2005. “The Development of NGOs under a Post-Totalitarian Regime: The Case of China". In Civil Life, Globalization, and Political Change in Asia: Organizing Between Family and State. Edited by Robert Wellner. (NY: Routledge) pp. 20–41.
- 2005. “Friends and Criticis of the State: The Case of Hong Kong". In Civil Life, Globalization, and Political Change in Asia: Organizing Between Family and State. Edited by Robert Wellner. (NY: Routledge ) pp. 58–75. (With Tai-lok Lui, Hsin-chi Kuan and Sunny Cheuk-wah Chan)
- 2003. “The Consequences of Home Ownership". In Indicators of Social Development: Hong Kong 2001. Edited by Shiu-kai Lau, Ming-kwan Lee, Po-san Wan and Siu-lun Wong (Hong Kong: Hong Kong Institute of Asia-Pacific Studies, The Chinese University of Hong Kong) pp. 233–247. (With Deborah Davis )
- 2003. “Current Challenges and Anti-corruption Measures in Hong Kong". In The Enemy Within: Combating Corruption in Asia. (Singapore: Eastern Universities Press ), pp. 109–130.
- 2002. “Resistance of the Neighbourhood Community to the AIDS Treatment Facilities – Case Study of Kowloon Bay Health Centre" (Hong Kong: Red Ribbon Centre).
- 2001. “Uncertainty, Acculturation and Corruption in Hong Kong", International Journal of Public Administration, Vol.24, No.9, pp. 909–928.
- 2000. “Towards an Integrated Model of Corruption: Opportunities and Control in China, " International Journal of Public Administration, Vol. 23, No. 4, pp. 507–551.
- 1999. “When the Lifeboat is Overloaded: Social Support and Enterprise Reform in China" Communist and Post-Communist Studies, Vol. 32, pp. 305–318. (with Haixiong Qiu)
- 1999. “Intermediate Organizations and Civil Society: The Case of Guangzhou". In China Review 1999. Edited by Chong Chor Lau & Geng Xiao (Hong Kong: The Chinese University Press), pp. 259–284.
- 1999. “Corruption in China: A Principal-Agent Perspective." In Handbook of Comparative Public Administration in the Asia-Pacific Basin. H.K. Edited by Wong & Hon S. Chan (NY: Marcel Dekker), pp. 299–324.
- 1998. “Small Government, Big Society: Social Organizations and Civil Society in China." China Area Studies Series, (by Tokyo University, Japan) No.8, pp. 34–47. (with Haixiong Qiu)
- 1997. “Combating Corruption and the ICAC." In The Other Hong Kong Report (Hong Kong: The Chinese University Press), pp. 101–121.
