= Wong Ji-yuet =

Hong Kong activist and politician (born 1997)

- 黃子悅
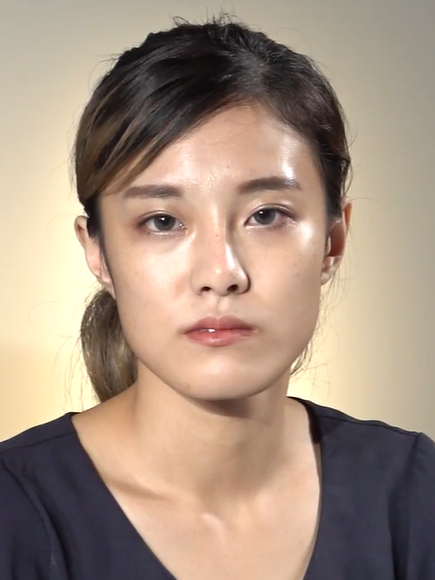

Spokesperson for Scholarism
- In office 22 May 2015 – 20 March 2016
- Succeeded by: Scholarism dissolved

Personal details
- Born: 27 September 1997 (age 28) Hong Kong
- Party: Independent
- Other political affiliations: Scholarism (2012-2016)
- Education: Lingnan University

Wong Ji-yuet
- Traditional Chinese: 黃子悅
- Simplified Chinese: 黄子悦
Transcriptions
Standard Mandarin
- Hanyu Pinyin: Huáng Zǐyuè
Yue: Cantonese
- Jyutping: wong4 zi2 jyut6

Prince Wong Ji-yuet (Chinese: 黃子悅; Jyutping: wong4 zi2 jyut6; born 27 September 1997) is a Hong Kong activist. A former spokesperson of Scholarism, she was involved in the Umbrella Revolution of 2014 and the anti-extradition bill protests in 2019.

== Activism ==
Wong was a Form Six student at the International Christian Quality Music Secondary and Primary School during the Umbrella Revolution of 2014, where she participated in the Occupy protests in Admiralty and Mong Kok. As a volunteer for student activist group Scholarism, she joined the secondary school boycott rally on 26 September, broke into Civic Square on 27 September, and spent her first night on the streets on 28 September. She slept on the streets in the occupation zones at night and went to school during the day, maintaining this routine for more than a month.

On 1 December 2014, Wong began a hunger strike with fellow activists Joshua Wong and Isabella Lo. The aim of their hunger strike was to initiate negotiation with the government on Hong Kong's electoral reform. Wong ended the hunger strike after 118 hours based on medical intervention. She was taken to the hospital.

On 18 November 2019, Wong came out in support of the people trapped inside the Hong Kong Polytechnic University during the police's siege of the campus. She was among those arrested during a mass police crackdown. Hundreds of the arrestees were subsequently charged with "rioting", including Wong.

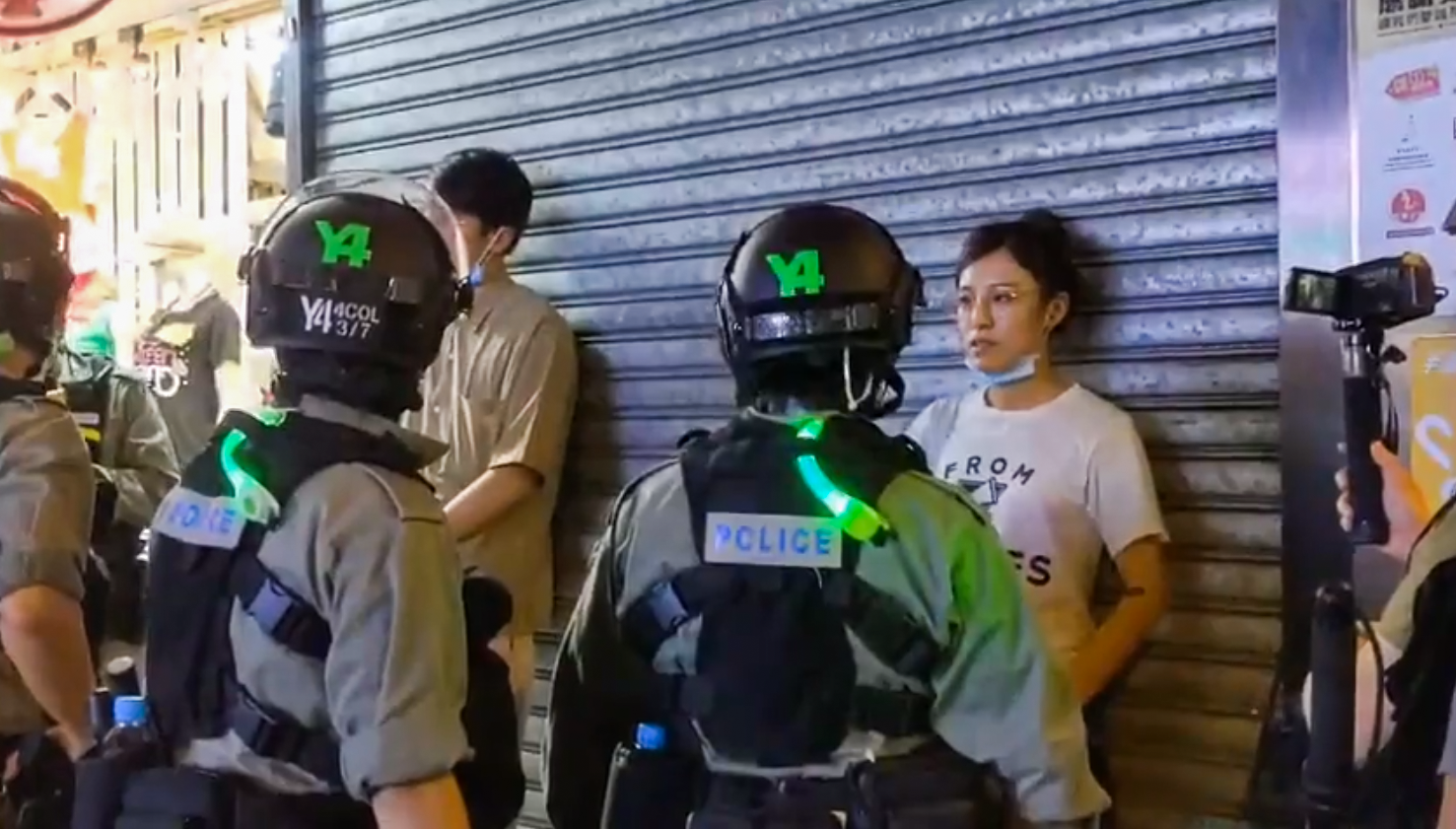
Wong Ji-yuet being stopped and searched by riot police on 10 May 2020

Wong has condemned the frequent sexism that she faces as a female pro-democracy figure. She stated, "I genuinely want to help Hong Kong. I just don't think it makes sense to compare what I wear to my work. I have my freedom to wear what I want." On 10 May 2020, Wong was near a protest that took place during Mother's Day in Mong Kok, where she was stopped and searched by the Hong Kong police. Wong accused the police officers of sexual harassment by making lewd comments about her body and chest size.

== Legislative Council bid ==
On 17 June 2020, Wong announced her intention to run in the 2020 Hong Kong legislative election. She contested in the unofficial pro-democracy primaries during July 2020. Wong came in third place among the candidates within the New Territories West constituency, securing herself a nomination spot in the general election. She received 22,911 votes, or 12.98 per cent of the votes cast.

== Arrests ==
On 6 January 2021, Wong was among 53 members of the pro-democratic camp who were arrested under the national security law, specifically its provision regarding alleged subversion. The group stood accused of the organisation of and participation in the pro-democracy primaries in July 2020. Wong was released on bail on 7 January.

On 28 February 2021, Wong was charged, along with 46 others, for subversion. She was released from prison after her bail application was granted by High Court judge Esther Toh on 21 December 2021. According to a written judgement that was released by the judiciary on 3 May 2022, Toh granted bail to enable Wong to finish her bachelor's degree, and due to her belief that she had not explicitly advocated for international sanctions against the authorities, and for Hong Kong independence, during the primaries.

On 6 March 2023, Wong, together with eight other defendants, pleaded guilty to rioting during the protest on 18 November 2019. An additional charge for possessing an offensive weapon was kept on file due to her guilty plea. She had her bail revoked as per her own application. She was sentenced to 37 months in prison on 13 July 2023.
