= Mingi =

Traditional belief of Karo and Hamar people in Ethiopia

Mingi is the traditional belief among the South Omotic-speaking Karo and Hamar peoples of southern Ethiopia that children with perceived and true physical abnormalities are ritually impure. An example of perceived abnormalities include the top teeth erupting before bottom teeth. Children born out of wedlock (marriage) are also considered impure and therefore capable of bringing curses upon the people. The fear of curses or bad luck for the tribe leads to the killing of many children. These children are disposed of either through drowning, putting soil in their mouths and strangling or leaving infants in the forest. The elders make the decision to brand a child mingi but the deaths are carried out by various members of the tribe. The Karo tribe officially banned the practice of mingi in July 2012, but it remains an active part of the belief system in others. It is believed as many as 686,000 individuals secretly practice it in other Omotic communities.

== Practices ==
Among the Karo and Hamar, physically deformed or mingi individuals have traditionally been considered to exert an evil influence upon others, so disabled infants have traditionally been disposed of without a proper burial. Such a child was historically killed by forced permanent separation from the tribe by being left alone in the jungle or by drowning in the river.

Reasons for being declared impure include birth out of wedlock, the birth of twins, the eruption of teeth in the upper jaw before the lower jaw, and chipping a tooth in childhood. Some who were separated have been reported to shadow the tribe at a distance until eventually succumbing to hunger or predators.

== History ==
When Italy occupied Ethiopia as part of its colony from 1936 to 1941, the Italian East Africa colonial government banned mingi practice because it was considered a crime.

A feature story in 2011 points out that there has been a dearth of academic scholarship on the subject, but "some observers have speculated that it might have started many generations ago as a way to purge people who are more likely to become a burden or who cannot contribute to the propagation of their people."

The Karo officially banned the practice in July 2012, while around 50,000 individuals secretly continue to practice it in other Omotic communities.

In 2008, Karo tribesman Lale Labuko began rescuing children deemed "mingi." The 2011 award-winning documentary film Drawn From Water chronicles Mr. Labuko's early mingi rescue activities. Together with California filmmaker and photographer John Rowe, Mr. Labuko founded Labuko's Omo Child Organization. To date, 37 children ages 1–11 have been rescued. The children live in a home built with the help of John Rowe.

An additional film about Mingi practices called Omo Child: The River and the Bush was released in 2015.

== See also ==
- Ableism
- Lookism
- Witchcraft accusations against children in Africa
