= Last Exit to Kai Tak =

2018 Hong Kong documentary by Matthew Torne

- Poster of Last Exit to Kai Tak
- Chinese: 分域大道
- Directed by: Matthew Torne
- Produced by: Matthew Torne; Jonathan Lele Young
- Cinematography: Jonathan Lele Young
- Distributed by: Ying e Chi
- Release date: 26 September 2018 (Hong Kong)
- Running time: 130 minutes
- Country: Hong Kong
- Language: Cantonese

Last Exit to Kai Tak (Chinese: 分域大道) is a 2018 Hong Kong documentary exploring the different choices and fates of Hongkongers in the aftermath of the 2014 Umbrella Revolution. Directed by British filmmaker Matthew Torne, the film follows the stories of five protagonists, portraying their struggles between leaving and staying, as well as the personal decisions they make in the face of changing times.

Unlike traditional protest documentaries, Last Exit to Kai Tak does not recount history through news-style reporting or focus on the intense clashes at protest sites. Instead, it pieces together a portrait of post-Umbrella Movement Hong Kong through the personal experiences of its participants. The film premiered on September 26, 2018, marking the fourth anniversary of the movement.

Matthew Torne has also directed another film Lessons in Dissent (2014) on the same topic of 2014 Umbrella Revolution.

== Plot ==
The five protagonists come from different points on the political spectrum, representing both moderate and radical views, as well as localist and pro-democracy stances. They include Joshua Wong, secretary-general of Demosistō; singer and activist Denise Ho; Wong Yeung-tat, leader of Civic Passion; and district council candidates Ed Lau Wai-tak and Derek Lam Shun-hin. Director Matthew Torne deliberately chose a diverse range of voices to reflect the complexity and diversity of Hong Kong society.

Some of them choose to emigrate, leaving behind the familiar Hong Kong in search of a new life, while others decide to stay, continuing their struggle and holding onto their beliefs. Their choices are not just personal decisions but also mirror the broader responses of Hong Kong society in times of turmoil.

Through a delicate narrative and authentic interviews, the film captures the critical choices Hongkongers face at a pivotal moment in history. Visually, the documentary makes extensive use of urban landscapes and everyday scenes from the protagonists’ lives, symbolizing the deep connection between individuals and the city's fate. Rather than imposing a singular viewpoint, the documentary allows the audience to reflect on the consequences of different choices through the stories of its subjects.

== Production ==
Director Matthew Torne began filming this post-Umbrella Revolution documentary in 2015, a process that took three years. During filming, he frequently passed through Prince Edward Road East to Kowloon Bay and Kwun Tong for location shoots, leading him to initially name the film Lion Rock, which was changed to Last Exit to Kai Tak later. The name was inspired by Last Exit to Brooklyn, a novel by Hubert Selby Jr.

Torne explained that he used the now-defunct Kai Tak Airport as a symbol of the dilemma Hongkongers have faced for generations — whether to stay or leave. In the past, many Hongkongers fled through this airport, while some later returned. Now, a new generation faces the same choice. With the airport no longer in operation, it also serves as a metaphor for having "no way out."
