= Joshua Wong =

Hong Kong activist (born 1996)

- 黃之鋒
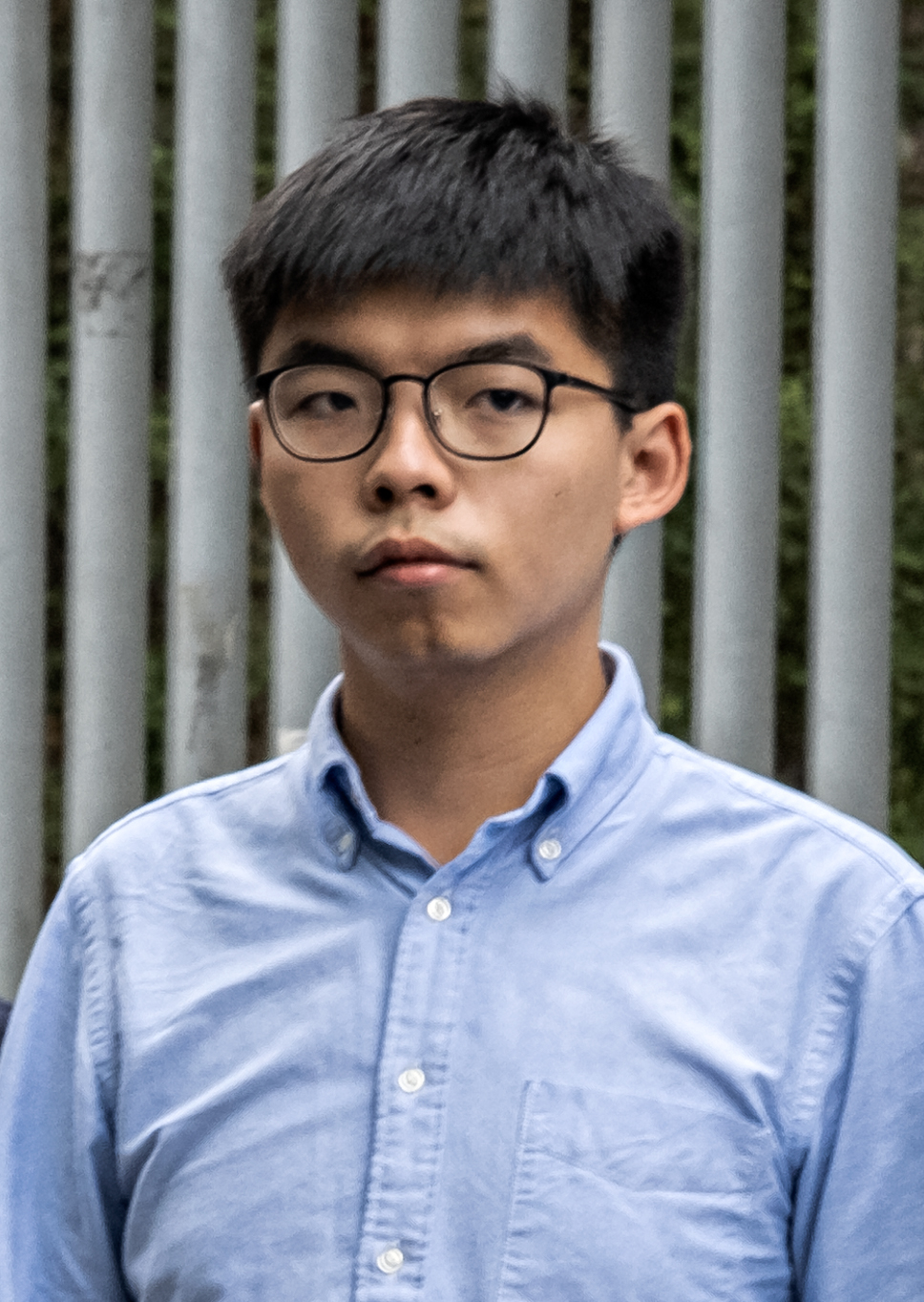
- Wong in 2019

Secretary-General of Demosistō
- In office 10 April 2016 – 30 June 2020
- Deputy: Agnes Chow; Kwok Hei-yiu; Chan Kok-hin
- Chairman: Nathan Law; Ivan Lam
- Preceded by: Office established
- Succeeded by: Party dissolved

Convenor of Scholarism
- In office 29 May 2011 – 20 March 2016
- Deputy: Agnes Chow
- Preceded by: Office established
- Succeeded by: Merge into Demosistō

Personal details
- Born: Wong Chi-fung; 13 October 1996 (age 30) British Hong Kong
- Party: Demosistō (2016–2020)
- Other political affiliations: Scholarism (2012–2016)
- Education: Open University of Hong Kong

Chinese name
- Traditional Chinese: 黃之鋒
- Simplified Chinese: 黄之锋
Transcriptions
Standard Mandarin
- Hanyu Pinyin: Huáng Zhīfēng
Yue: Cantonese
- Yale Romanization: Wòng Jīfūng
- Jyutping: Wong^{4} Zi^{1}fung^{1}

Joshua Wong Chi-fung (Chinese: 黃之鋒; Cantonese Yale: Wòhng Jīfūng; born 13 October 1996) is a Hong Kong activist and politician. He served as secretary-general of the pro-democracy party Demosistō until it disbanded following implementation of the Hong Kong national security law on 30 June 2020. Wong was previously convenor and founder of the Hong Kong student activist group Scholarism. Wong first rose to international prominence during the 2014 Hong Kong protests, and his pivotal role in the Umbrella Movement resulted in his inclusion in Time magazine's Most Influential Teens of 2014 and nomination for its 2014 Person of the Year; he was named one of the "world's greatest leaders" by Fortune magazine in 2015.

In August 2017, Wong and two other democracy activists were convicted and jailed for their roles in the occupation of Civic Square at the incipient stage of the 2014 Occupy Central protests; in January 2018, Wong was convicted and jailed again for failing to comply with a court order for clearance of the Mong Kok protest site during the Hong Kong protests in 2014. He also played a major role in persuading U.S. members of Congress to pass the Hong Kong Human Rights and Democracy Act during the 2019–2020 Hong Kong protests. Wong was disqualified by the Hong Kong government from running in forthcoming District Council elections. In June 2020, he announced he would run for a Legislative Council seat in the upcoming election, and officially applied on 20 July 2020, before his nomination was invalidated on 30 July 2020 along with that of 11 other pro-democracy figures. In December 2020, Wong was convicted and jailed for more than a year over an unauthorised protest outside police headquarters in June 2019. In a national security trial in 2024, a Hong Kong court sentenced Wong to jail for 4 years and 8 months for subversion. In 2026, he was sentenced to 10 years in prison for "colluding with foreign forces."

== Early life and education ==
Joshua Wong Chi-fung was born in Hong Kong on 13 October 1996, and was diagnosed with dyslexia in early childhood. The son of middle-class couple Grace and Roger Wong, Wong was raised as a Protestant Christian in the Lutheran tradition. His early interest in social activism was influenced by his father, a retired IT professional, who was a convener of a local anti-gay marriage initiative and often took him to visit underprivileged communities.

Wong studied at the United Christian College (Kowloon East), a private Christian secondary school in Kowloon, and developed organisational and public speaking skills through involvement in church groups. Wong pursued undergraduate studies at the Open University of Hong Kong, having enrolled in a bachelor's degree in political studies and public administration. Due to his political activities, Wong took leave from his studies, and reportedly remained a student until 2019.

== Student activism (2010–2016) ==
=== Early activism ===
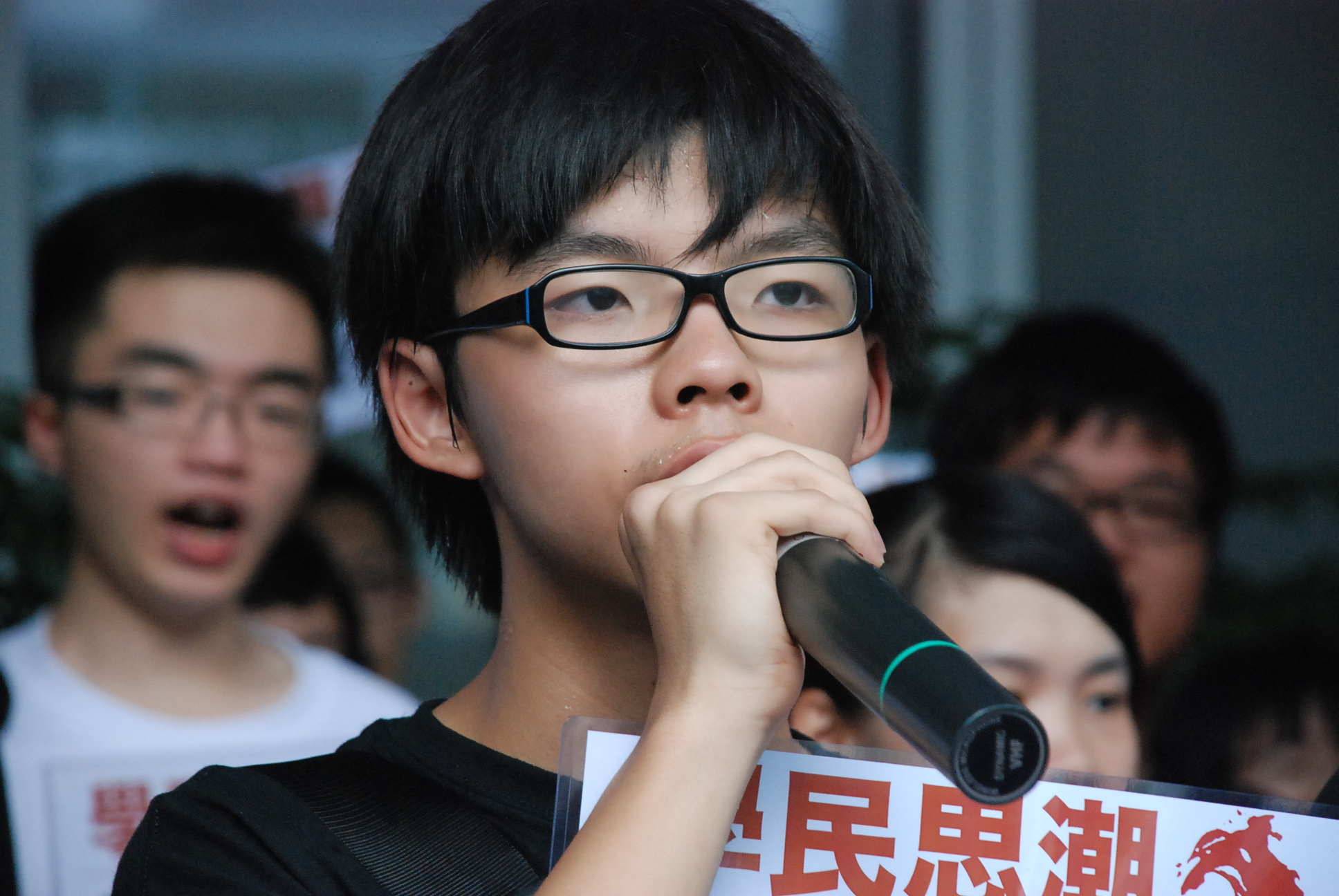
Wong led a protest against Moral and national education in 2012

The 2010 anti-high speed rail protests were the first political protests in which Wong took part.

On 29 May 2011, Wong and schoolmate Ivan Lam Long-yin established Scholarism, a student activist group. The group began with simple means of protest, such as the distribution of leaflets against the newly announced moral and national education (MNE) curriculum. In time, however, Wong's group grew in both size and influence, and in 2012 managed to organise a political rally attended by over 100,000 people. Wong received widespread attention as the group's convenor.

=== Role in 2014 Hong Kong protests ===
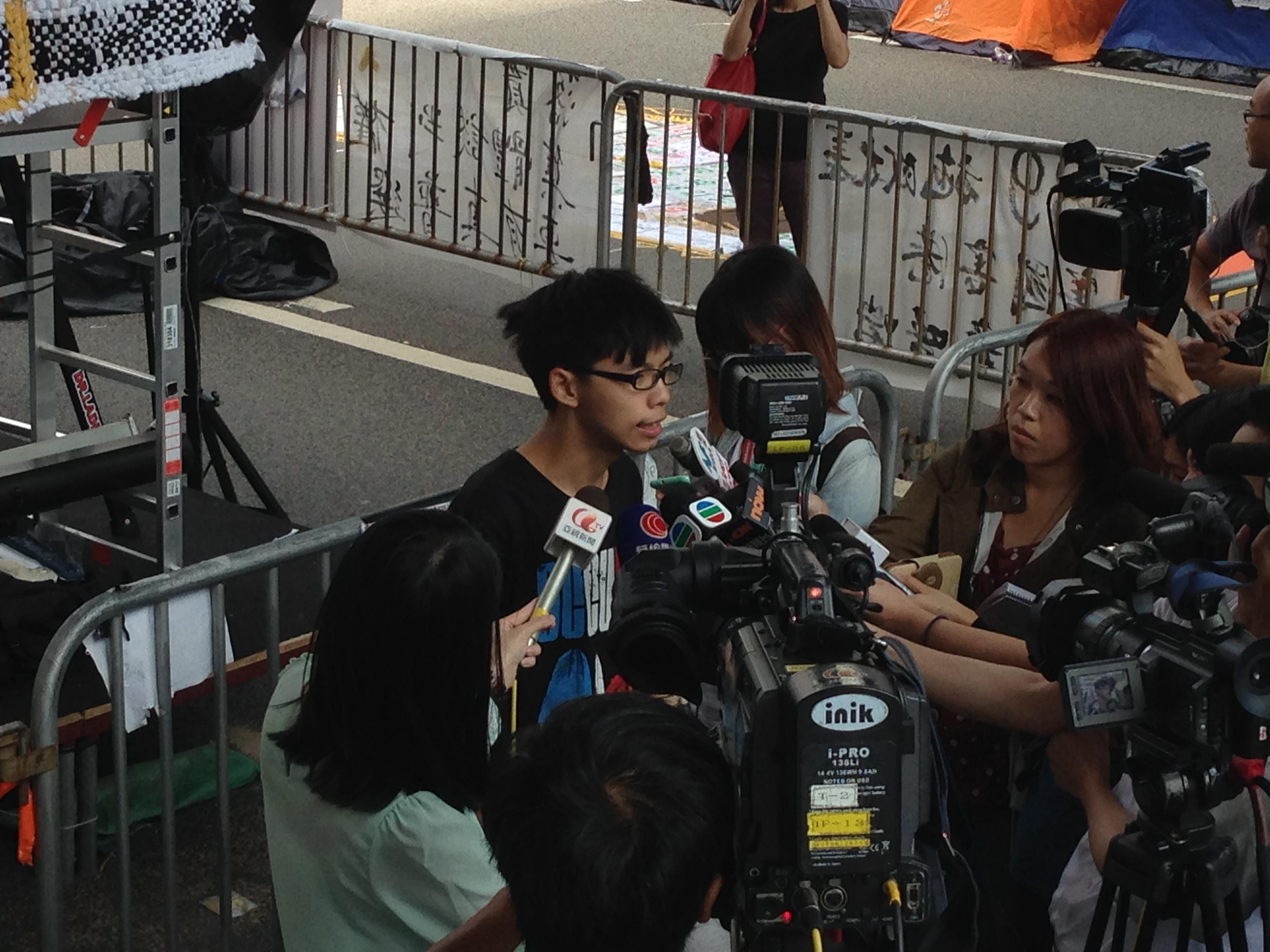
Wong giving an interview in October 2014, during the Umbrella Movement

In June 2014, Scholarism drafted a plan to reform Hong Kong's electoral system to push for universal suffrage, under one country, two systems. His group strongly advocated for the inclusion of civic nomination in the 2017 Hong Kong Chief Executive election. Wong as a student leader started a class boycott among Hong Kong's students to send a pro-democracy message to Beijing.

On 27 September 2014, Wong was one of the 78 people arrested by the police during a massive pro-democracy protest, after hundreds of students occupied Civic Square in front of the Central Government Complex as a sign of protest against Beijing's decision on the 2014 Hong Kong electoral reform. Unlike fellow protesters, only in response to a court order obtained by writ of habeas corpus was Wong released by police, after 46 hours in custody.

During the protests, Wong stated: "Among all the people in Hong Kong, there is only one person who can decide whether the current movement will last and he is [Chief Executive of the region] Leung. If Leung can accept our demands ... (the) movement will naturally come to an end." On 25 September 2014 the state-owned Wen Wei Po published an article which claimed that "US forces" had worked to cultivate Wong as a "political superstar". Wong in turn denied every detail in the report through a statement that he subsequently posted online. Wong also said that he was mentioned by name in mainland China's Blue Paper on National Security, which identified internal threats to the stability of Communist Party rule; quoting a line in V for Vendetta, he in turn said that "People should not be afraid of their government, the government should be afraid of their people."

Wong was charged on 27 November 2014 with obstructing a bailiff clearing one of Hong Kong's three protest areas. His lawyer described the charge as politically motivated. He was banned from a large part of Mong Kok, one of the protester-occupied sites, as one of the bail conditions. Wong claimed that police beat him and tried to injure his groin as he was arrested, and taunted and swore at him while he was in custody.

After Wong's appearance at Kowloon City Magistrates' Court on 27 November 2014, he was pelted with eggs by two assailants. They were arrested and each fined $3,000 in August 2015, sentences which, on application for review by the prosecution, were subsequently enhanced to two weeks' imprisonment.

On 2 December 2014, Wong and two other students began an indefinite hunger strike to demand renewed talks with the Hong Kong government. He decided to end the hunger strike after four days on medical advice.

=== Aftermath of the Occupy protests ===
Wong was arrested and held for three hours on Friday, 16 January 2015, for his alleged involvement in offences of calling for, inciting and participating in an unauthorised assembly.

The same month, an article appeared in the Pro-Beijing newspaper Wen Wei Po alleging that Wong had met with the US consul-general in Hong Kong Stephen M. Young during the latter's visit in 2011. It suggested that Wong had links with the Central Intelligence Agency of the United States, which had supposedly offered him military training by the US Army. Wong responded that the claims were pure fiction and "more like jokes."

Wong was denied entry into Malaysia at Penang International Airport, on 26 May 2015, on the basis that he was considered "a threat to Malaysia's ties with China", largely due to his supposed "anti-China" stance in participating in the 2014 Hong Kong protests.

On 28 June 2015, two days before a protest in favour of democracy, Wong and his girlfriend were attacked by an unknown man after watching a film in Mong Kok. The assault sent the two to hospital. Wong sustained injuries to his nose and eyes. No one was arrested.

On 19 August 2015, Wong was formally charged by the Hong Kong Department of Justice with inciting other people to join an unlawful assembly and also joining an unlawful assembly, alongside Alex Chow, the former leader of the Hong Kong Federation of Students.

While travelling to Taiwan for a political seminar, "pro-China" protesters attempted to assault Wong at the arrival hall of Taoyuan's Taiwan Taoyuan International Airport, necessitating police protection. It was later found that local gangsters were involved.

==== Detention in Thailand ====
Wong was detained on arrival in Thailand on 5 October 2016. He had been invited to speak about his Umbrella Movement experience at an event marking the 40th anniversary of the Thammasat University massacre, hosted by Chulalongkorn University.

A Thai student activist who invited Wong, Netiwit Chotiphatphaisal, said that Thai authorities had received a request from the Chinese government earlier regarding Wong's visit. His own request to see Wong was denied.

After nearly 12 hours of detention, Wong was deported to Hong Kong. Wong claimed that, upon detention, the authorities would say no more than that he had been blacklisted but, just prior to deportation, they had informed him that his deportation was pursuant to Sections 19, 22 and 54 of the Immigration Act B.E. 2522.

Hong Kong Legislator Claudia Mo called the incident "despicable" and stated: "If this becomes a precedent it means it could happen to you or me at any time if somehow Beijing thinks you are a dangerous, unwelcome person". Jason Y. Ng, a Hong Kong journalist and author, stated that Wong's detention showed "how ready Beijing is to flex its diplomatic muscles and [how it] expects neighbouring governments to play ball".

Wong eventually spoke with a Thai audience from Hong Kong via Skype.

== Political career (2016–2020) ==
=== Founding of Demosistō ===
In April 2016, Wong founded a new political party, Demosistō, with other Scholarism leaders including Agnes Chow, Oscar Lai, and Umbrella activists, the original student activist group Scholarism having been disbanded. The party advocated for a referendum to be held to determine Hong Kong's sovereignty after 2047, the scheduled expiration of the one country, two systems principle enshrined in the Sino-British Joint Declaration and the Hong Kong Basic Law. As the founding secretary-general of the party, Wong also planned to contest the 2016 Legislative Council election. Wong was still only 19 and being below the statutory minimum age of 21 for candidacy, he filed an application (ultimately unsuccessful) for judicial review of the election law, in October 2015. After his decision to found his own political party, Wong became a focus of criticism, especially on social networks.

=== Role in 2019–2020 Hong Kong protests ===
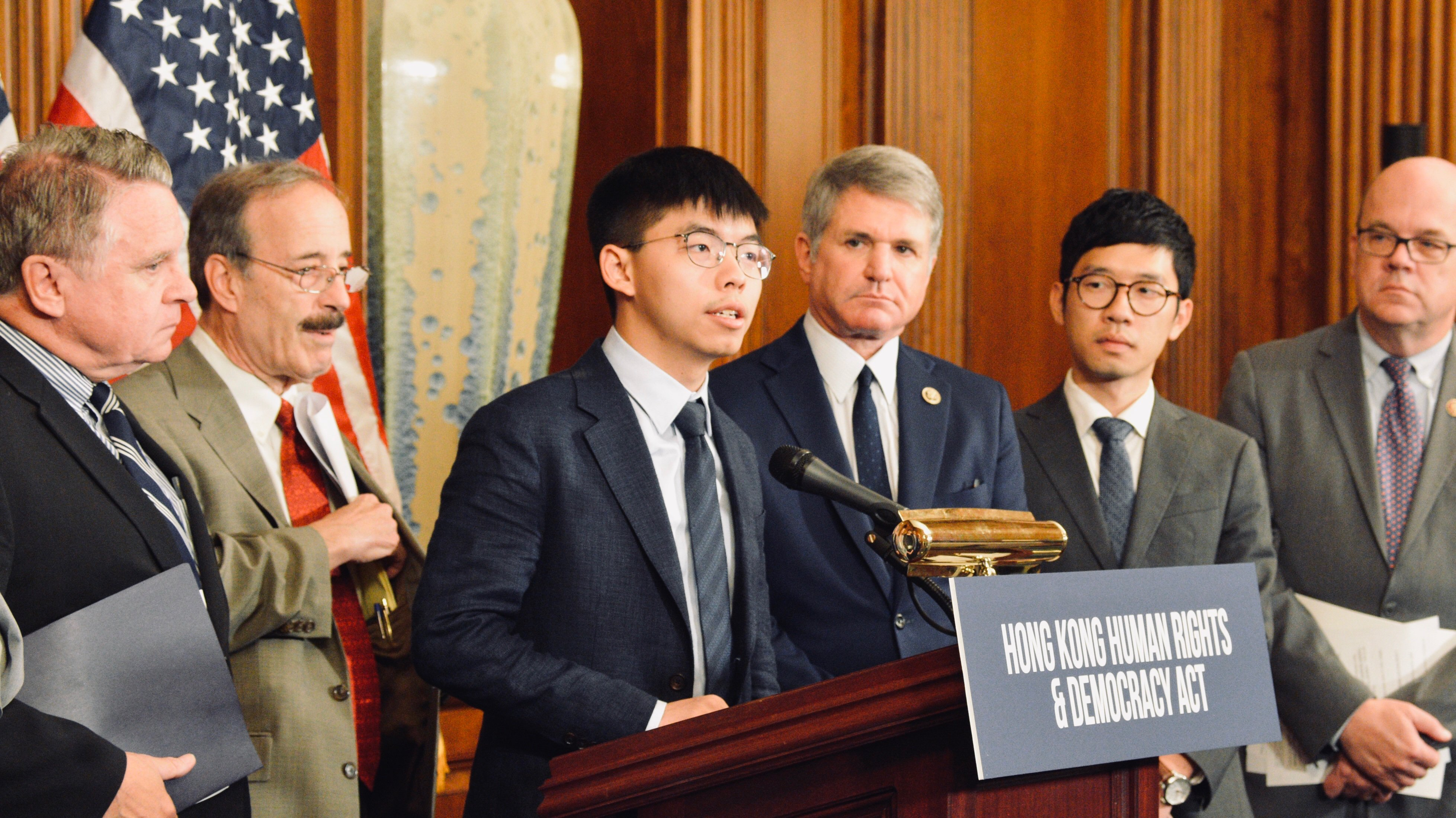
Wong speaks at the United States Capitol in 2019

Joshua Wong's release coincided with the ongoing protests against extradition bill. Upon his release, Wong criticised the oppression of protesters by the Hong Kong police, and the extradition draft law as pro-Beijing and called for the Chief Executive of Hong Kong Carrie Lam to resign.

Wong did not take part with the protesters who forcibly broke into the Hong Kong's parliamentary Legislative Council building on 1 July, but he explained the need behind the move. According to him, the reason behind people entering the Legislative Council is that the council is "never democratically elected by people".

Wong was then arrested again on 29 August 2019 the day before a planned demonstration, which was not given city approval.

On 9 September, Wong met with the German Foreign Minister Heiko Maas. The Chinese Foreign Ministry called this move "disrespectful of China's sovereignty and an interference in China's internal affairs".

On 17 September, Wong and other student activists participated in a Congressional-Executive Commission on China (CECC) commission in the United States Capitol. He said that the Chinese government should not grab all the economic benefit from Hong Kong, while attacking the freedom of Hong Kong. He also urged the U.S. Congress to pass the Hong Kong Human Rights and Democracy Act. Chinese Foreign Ministry spokesman Geng Shuang responded that the U.S. should not interfere in China's affairs.

The Speaker of the House of Representatives, Nancy Pelosi, met with Wong on Capitol Hill in Washington, D.C., on 18 September. Chinese media sharply criticised Pelosi for this meeting, accusing her of "backing and encouraging radical activists."

In October 2019, Wong met with Thai opposition politician Thanathorn Juangroongruangkit at the Open Future Festival. Wong tweeted a picture of the two together, writing, "Under the hard-line authoritarian suppression, we stand in solidarity." The Chinese embassy in Bangkok issued a statement referring to the incident as irresponsible. Thanathorn issued a statement denying any relationship with Wong and stating that he supports China playing a bigger role both regionally and globally.

=== 2019 District Councillor election controversy ===
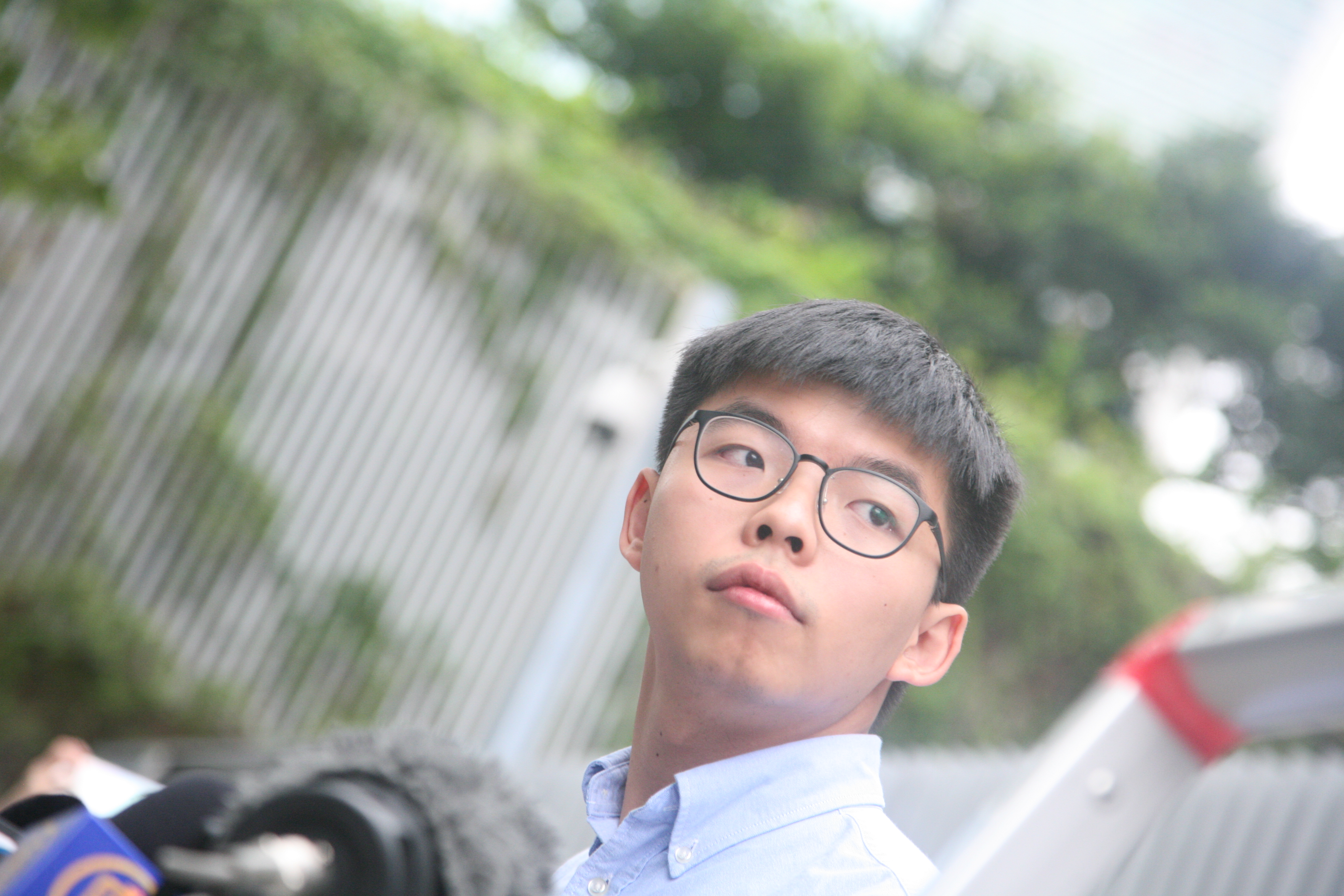
Joshua Wong was banned from the election by the government of Hong Kong on 29 October 2019

On 29 October 2019, Joshua Wong was barred from running in forthcoming district council elections in the South Horizons West constituency by returning officer Laura Liang Aron, who temporarily took over for Dorothy Ma Chau Pui-fun (South Horizon West's returning officer) after the latter took sick leave. Many (including Joshua Wong himself) have accused the Chinese Central Government and the Hong Kong Government of pressuring Returning Officers into disqualifying Joshua Wong.

=== National Security Law and the disbanding of Demosistō ===
On 30 June 2020, Wong, together with Agnes Chow and Nathan Law, announced respectively on Demosistō's Facebook page that they had quit the group in light of the risk of prosecution under the national security law enacted by China. Hours later, the Demosistō organisation also announced on its blog that it was ceasing all activity, signing off with the message "We will meet again".

=== 2020 legislative election ===
In June 2020, Wong announced he would run for a Legislative Council seat in the upcoming election, and officially applied on 20 July 2020, before his nomination was invalidated on 30 July 2020 along with that of 11 other pro-democracy figures.

=== Others ===
In June 2020 during the George Floyd protests, Wong voiced his support for the Black Lives Matter movement and opposition to police brutality in the United States. In the same month, he also called American basketball player LeBron James "hypocritical" for only focusing on issues in the U.S. and staying silent regarding issues in China.

== Imprisonments ==
=== Imprisonment in 2017 ===
Wong, along with two other prominent Hong Kong pro-democracy student leaders Nathan Law and Alex Chow, were jailed for six to eight months on 17 August 2017 for unlawful assembly (Wong and Law) and incitement to assemble unlawfully (Chow) at Civic Square, at the Central Government Complex in the Tamar site, during a protest that triggered the 79-day Occupy sit-ins of 2014. The sentences halted their political careers, as they would be barred from running for public office for five years.

On the third anniversary of the 2014 protests, 28 September 2017, Wong started the first of a series of columns for The Guardian, written from the Pik Uk Correctional Institution, where he said that despite a dull and dry life there, he remained proud of his commitment to the movement.

On 13 October 2017, Wong was convicted with 19 others of contempt of court for obstructing execution of the court's order for clearance of part of the Occupy Central protest zone in Mong Kok in October 2014. The order had been obtained by a public minibus association.

On 14 November 2017, Wong, together with Ivan Lam, commenced an application for judicial review in the High Court challenging the constitutionality of the provision in the Legislative Council Ordinance preventing persons sentenced to terms of imprisonment exceeding three months from standing for office for five years from the date of conviction.

On 18 January 2018, Wong was sentenced by Mr Justice Andrew H C Chan of the High Court to three months' imprisonment in respect of his October 2017 conviction for contempt of court. Nineteen other protesters convicted in respect of the same incident all received prison terms, though the terms were suspended for all but Wong and fellow protester Raphael Wong. As part of his reasoning, Chan expressed the view that, by November 2014, the protests had become pointless and their only effect was to impact the lives of "ordinary citizens" of the region.

=== Imprisonment in 2019 ===
Wong was sentenced to two months of prison on 16 May 2019, for his involvement in events on 26 November 2014 in Mong Kok, an area in Hong Kong, where demonstrators opposed the police during the Umbrella revolution.

Joshua Wong was released on 17 June 2019, after just around a month time in jail because he had already served some time associated to this case back in 2018, thus adding up to a total of two months' term.

=== Imprisonment beginning in 2020 ===
On 24 September 2020, Wong was arrested when he reported to a police station regarding another case against him. He was charged with "unlawful assembly", which was related to his participation in the 2019 protest against a government ban on face masks, where he was said to have violated the anti-mask law of Hong Kong. On 30 September, he was temporarily released by the court along with activist Koo Sze-yiu. The Principal Magistrate granted the two bail of HK$1,000 each.

On 23 November 2020, Wong appeared with Ivan Lam Long-yin and Agnes Chow Ting in the West Kowloon District Court, where they had been expected to stand trial over their roles in the anti extradition bill protest on 21 June 2019. He was charged with organising an unauthorised assembly and of inciting others to take part in the event. The three pleaded guilty, and were put in custody until sentencing at a court hearing scheduled for 2 December 2020. Before appearing in court, Wong had said the trio were prepared to face immediate jail terms, and hoped their stance would draw global attention to a criminal justice system he claimed was being "manipulated by Beijing." Wong, together with Ivan Lam, was remanded to Lai Chi Kok Reception Centre.

On 2 December 2020, Wong was found guilty of organising and inciting unlawful assembly, but not guilty of taking part in it. He was sentenced to 1 year and 1 month in prison. West Kowloon Magistrate Wong Sze-lai, stated: "The defendants called on protesters to besiege the headquarters and chanted slogans that undermine the police force". Amnesty International condemned the sentencing, saying that the Chinese authorities "send a warning to anyone who dares to openly criticise the government that they could be next."

It was reported in January 2021 that Wong's family had moved to Australia.

On 29 January 2021, Wong pleaded guilty to two additional charges related to his involvement in a rally on Hong Kong Island on 5 October 2019: taking part in an unauthorised assembly and wearing a facial covering during an unauthorised assembly.

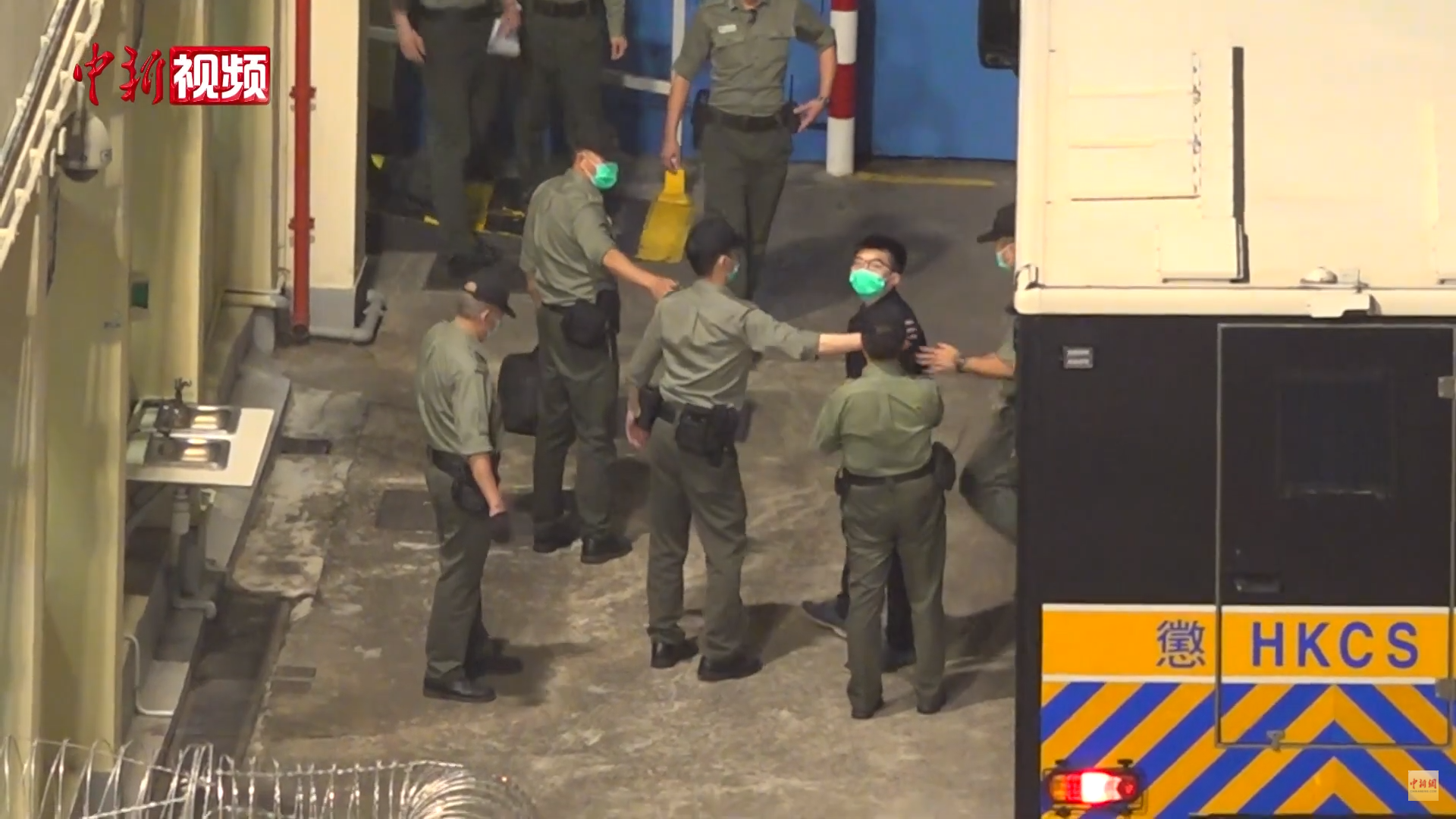
Wong being escorted by the Correctional Services Department in Lai Chi Kok Reception Centre

On 13 April 2021, Wong was sentenced to four months in jail for unauthorised assembly and violating an anti-mask law.

On 6 May 2021, the Hong Kong District Court sentenced Wong to ten more months in prison for participating in an unauthorised assembly to mark the 2020 anniversary of the Tiananmen Square massacre. The judge who sentenced him said that "[T]he sentence should deter people from offending and re-offending in the future."

On 17 April 2023, Wong was sentenced to further three months in prison after being convicted of disclosing personal details of a police officer who shot live rounds against a protester in Sai Wan Ho.

The 2023 book Among the Braves by journalists Shibani Mahtani and Timothy McLaughlin states that Wong had requested U.S. political asylum in 2020 but, according to a National Security Council official, his bid was denied despite the risk of Wong being jailed because the State Department under Mike Pompeo had considered national interests in relation to China as having priority.

On 6 June 2025, Wong was arrested in Stanley Prison and brought to the court the same day. According to the charge sheet, he stood accused of conspiring to collude with foreign forces, a crime under the national security law. Specifically, the accusation mentioned collusion with Nathan Law and "other persons unknown" between 1 July and 23 November 2020 to request foreign powers to impose sanctions against Hong Kong or China. In May 2026, the case was transferred to High Court, following an announcement in August 2025 by a magistrate.

==== International responses to the 2020 imprisonment ====
===== United States =====
US House of Representative Speaker Nancy Pelosi issued a statement saying "China's brutal sentencing of these young champions of democracy in Hong Kong is appalling." Pelosi further called on the world to denounce "this unjust sentencing and China's widespread assault on Hong Kongers." US Senator Marsha Blackburn also called the sentence destroying "any semblance of autonomy in Hong Kong." In addition, US State Secretary Michael Pompeo decried the prison term in an official statement issued by the State department.

===== United Kingdom =====
UK Foreign Minister Dominic Raab issued a statement urging "Hong Kong and Beijing authorities to bring an end to their campaign to stifle opposition" in response to the prison sentences of the three pro-democracy activists.

===== Japan =====
Japan's government spokesperson Katsunobu Kato in a regular news conference expressed Japan's "increasingly grave concerns about the recent Hong Kong situation such as sentences against three including Agnes Chow".

===== Taiwan =====
The Overseas Community Affairs Council (OCAC) issued a statement referencing to the Mainland Affairs Council (MAC) that "the decision to imprison Joshua Wong, Agnes Chow, and Ivan Lam represents a failure by the Hong Kong government to protect the people's political rights and freedom of speech."

===== Germany =====
Maria Adebahr, a Germany's foreign ministry spokesperson, stated that the prison terms are "another building block in a series of worrisome developments that we have seen in connection with human and civil rights in Hong Kong during the last year."

=== Imprisonment under National Security Law ===
On 6 January 2021, Wong was among 53 members of the pro-democratic camp who were arrested under the national security law, specifically its provision regarding alleged subversion. The group stood accused of the organisation of and participation in the primaries of July 2020. Wong's home was searched while he was detained. On 28 February 2021, Wong was formally charged, along with 46 others for subversion.

In 2024, following a national security trial in Hong Kong, Wong was sentenced to jail for subversion. In November that year, the court sentenced Wong to jail for 4 years and 8 months for subversion.

On 2 September 2026 he pleaded guilty to colluding with foreign entities. In November 2026, he was subsequently sentenced to another 10 years in prison for "colluding with foreign forces", scheduled to run concurrently with his previous sentencing. Wong notably refuted in a statement that he advocated for Hong Kong independence, and hoped that "he'd be able to look back on this period as a trial that strengthened him."

== Books ==
- Unfree Speech: The Threat to Global Democracy and Why We Must Act, Now. With Jason Y. Ng. London: Penguin Books, 2020. Introduction by Ai Weiwei, Foreword by Chris Patten.

== In the media ==
Joshua Wong has appeared in several non-fiction films including:

- Lessons in Dissent, 2014
- Umbrella Revolution: History as Mirror Reflection, 2015
- Raise the Umbrellas, 2016
- Joshua: Teenager vs. Superpower, 2017
- Last Exit to Kai Tak, 2018

== Awards ==
- The Times – Young Person of the year, 2014
- AFP – 10 Most influential people, 2014
- TIME – Person of the Year 2014 (Reader's Poll – 3rd place), 2014
- Foreign Policy – 100 Leading Global Thinkers, 2014
- TIME – The 25 Most Influential Teens of 2014
- TIME Cover (Asia Edition), 2014
- Fortune – World's 50 Greatest Leaders (10th place), 2015
- Nobel Peace Prize 2018 nomination, with Nathan Law, Alex Chow and the pro-democracy Umbrella Movement in Hong Kong, by the United States' Congressional-Executive Commission on China (CECC) (press release)

== See also ==
- List of Chinese pro-democracy activists

Political offices
New title	Convenor of Scholarism; 2011–2016	Organisation dissolved
Party political offices
New title	Secretary-General of Demosistō; 2016–2020	Party dissolved
