= Unquiet Graves =

- Advertising poster
- Directed by: Seán A. Murray
- Written by: Seán A. Murray
- Produced by: Seán A. Murray
- Starring: Chris Patrick-Simpson; Patrick Buchanan; Chris McMahon; Andrew McNeill
- Narrated by: Stephen Rea
- Cinematography: Kevin Treacy
- Edited by: John Phillipson
- Music by: Declan Gallen
- Production company: Relapse Pictures
- Distributed by: Journeyman Pictures
- Release date: 11 July 2018 (Galway Film Fleadh)
- Running time: 75 minutes
- Country: Northern Ireland
- Language: English

Unquiet Graves: The Story of the Glenanne Gang is a 2018 documentary film about The Troubles in Northern Ireland.

== Production ==
Unquiet Graves was filmed in Dolby Surround 7.1 in a 16:9 ratio. The film was based on work by the Pat Finucane Centre, Justice for the Forgotten and Anne Cadwallader's book Lethal Allies. John Weir was a major contributor. Northern Ireland Screen contributed £5,000 to the production. In response to questions about the funding of the film, Murray stated that "The film was a socially committed project and most of the crew who assisted in the making of the film done so on a voluntary basis, including myself."

== Synopsis ==
Unquiet Graves discusses the activities of the Glenanne gang of the paramilitary Ulster Volunteer Force, with the support and collusion of soldiers from the Ulster Defence Regiment and police officers from the Royal Ulster Constabulary, in Northern Ireland's Counties Tyrone and Armagh between 1972 and 1978. They are accused of the murder of 120 Irish Catholic civilians in that period.

One of the most notable claims in the film is that the UVF considered carrying out a massacre at a Catholic parochial school in Belleeks in retaliation for the 1976 Kingsmill massacre; supposedly, the idea for the attack came from British military intelligence, who wanted violence in Northern Ireland to "spiral out of control" in order to justify a severe military response, a "short and sharp process of cleansing out the IRA."

== Release ==
Unquiet Graves premiered at the Galway Film Fleadh at the Town Hall Theatre on 11 July 2018.

The film had its pre-release premiere in Belfast on 21 February 2019.

The film came to wider public attention when it was aired on the Republic of Ireland state broadcaster, RTÉ One, on 16 September 2020.

== Reception ==
=== Critical response ===
Writing in The Canary, Peadar O'Cearnaigh said that the Troubles was "seen as a local dispute involving only the Irish. The British were just honest brokers and tried to make peace between these two tribes. That mythical description is put to bed in Unquiet Graves. The documentary sets about uncovering the dangerous and one-sided role played by the British state in the Irish conflict."

=== Political response ===
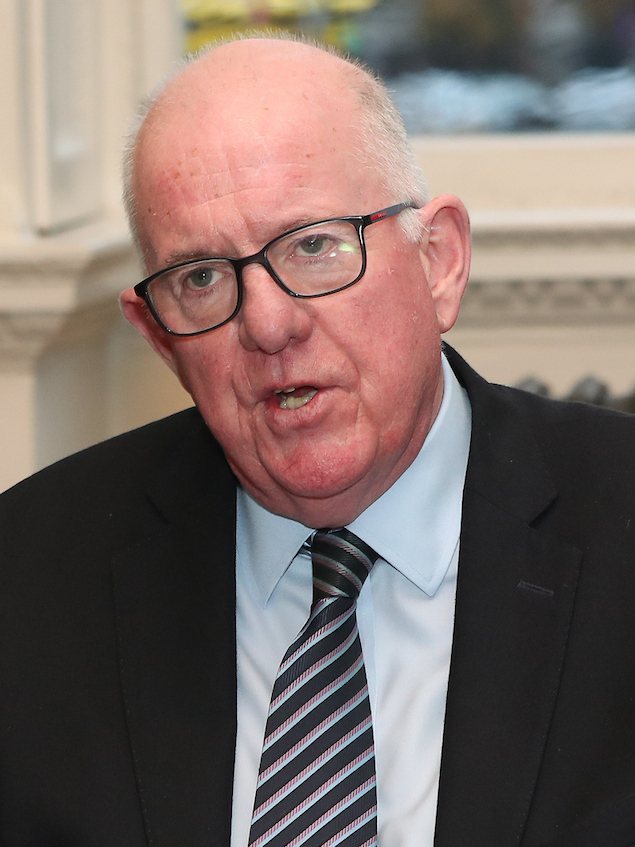
Charles Flanagan, a Fine Gael politician from County Laois, attacked the film

Charles Flanagan, a Fine Gael TD and former Republic of Ireland Minister for Justice and Equality, attacked the film, saying that he "did not believe the documentary was objective, fair minded and balanced and questioned if RTE bosses were aware of how it was funded." In response, Margaret Urwin, Coordinator at Justice for the Forgotten, said that Flanagan "claims the basis of the film was John Weir’s affidavit and claims that his motives were dubious. That is totally erroneous. […] The film is actually based on the book entitled Lethal Allies […] a very important witness in the film was Steve Morris who led a team within the Historical Enquiries Team at the PSNI and he was also a former police officer with the London Met. […] the late Justice Barron who carried out four investigations in the early 2000s on behalf of the [Republic of Ireland] Government found that John Weir’s testimony was credible – as did the Gardaí."

Writing for The News Letter, Mark Rainey noted that the film's creator Seán A. Murray, was the son of Sean Murray, a longtime republican activist alleged to be a senior figure in the Provisional IRA.

In reply, Murray instructed solicitors and prepared a libel case. Regarding Weir, he wrote that "The independent panel of academic experts and a judge-led Oireachtas inquiry into the 'Glenanne Series' of attacks found corroborating evidence for Weir's testimony in RUC files on no fewer than 11 murders."

Former IRA explosives expert and London bomber, Shane Paul O'Doherty, posted a blog examining whether Unquiet Graves might be regarded as either balanced film-making or IRA propaganda. In the blog post, O'Doherty highlighted that Murray had not warned viewers that one of his central researchers and commentators, Paul O'Connor, had hidden his IRA past for decades while posing as a Human Rights activist and Director of the Pat Finucane Centre. O'Doherty claimed that Paul O'Connor was a former IRA gunman and bomber who was involved in the murder of an IRA volunteer, Jim O'Hagan. O'Doherty pointed out several other factual errors in Unquiet Graves, rendering a final opinion that Unquiet Graves could justifiably be seen as IRA propaganda in light of the evidence contained in his blog post considered alongside Murray's extreme political views and his failure to record details of the IRA's 800 murders during the period covered by his documentary.

Within days of O'Doherty's post, O'Connor was forced to publicly admit his IRA past and the accuracy of many of O'Doherty's blog claims.
