= Lessons in Dissent =

2014 Hong Kong documentary by Matthew Torne

- Film poster
- Directed by: Matthew Torne
- Written by: Matthew Torne
- Produced by: Matthew Torne; Grace Wong; Li Ping Kong
- Starring: Joshua Wong; Ma Wan Ke
- Cinematography: Eddie Hung Hon-chuen
- Edited by: Lam Kin-kuan
- Music by: Phila Yuen
- Distributed by: Torne Films Ltd; Edko Films (HK); Journeyman Pictures (international)
- Release date: 29 March 2014 (Hong Kong International Film Festival)
- Running time: 97 minutes
- Language: Cantonese
- Budget: HK$3 million

Lessons in Dissent (Chinese: 未夠秤) is a 2014 documentary film about young political activists in Hong Kong.

== Synopsis ==
Lessons in Dissent was filmed over 2011 and 2012 and follows two student activists, Joshua Wong and Ma Jai, as they protest the proposed adoption of the Moral and National Education curriculum for Hong Kong's schools. They felt the curriculum amounted to brainwashing. Wong, a secondary school student, founded a student group called Scholarism to fight the changes. Ma Jai, a school drop-out, remained active in the League of Social Democrats as an organiser and protester. Both were arrested for their efforts but the protests succeeded and that National Education curriculum was made optional.

== History ==
The film was premiered at the 38th Hong Kong International Film Festival on 29 March 2014 and released in theatres a week later on 5 April 2014. It played in theatres in Hong Kong during the summer of 2014. It gained renewed notoriety during the Umbrella Revolution of the fall of 2014 with Joshua Wong's prominent role. It was screened at the Mumbai International Film Festival. and the One World film festival in Prague, Czech Republic, March 2015. It has been broadcast on NHK in Japan, PTS in Taiwan and on Movie Movie channel in Hong Kong. It is available to purchase on Amazon, YouTube, and iTunes.
