= Lale Labuko =

Ethiopian activist

- Education: Hampshire College
- Occupation: Activist
- Known for: co-founding the Omo Child Shelter

Lale Labuko is an Ethiopian activist and founder of the Omo Child Shelter which houses children who are at risk of being killed due to certain tribal beliefs.

== Biography ==
Lale Labuko comes from the Kara tribe and grew up in the village of Dus which is by the Omo River. When he was aged about 15 years, he witnessed the practice of Mingi. In 2012, he was working to save a baby girl deemed Mingi, because she was born out of wedlock. In 2012, Lale ran a shelter for the "cursed" children. Together with film maker John Rowe, Lale founded the Omo Child Shelter. He has already adopted 50 children and saved their lives. He has to stay part of the year in United States as he is a student at Hampshire College.

== In popular culture ==
Lale is featured in John Rowe's 2015 film Omo Child: The River and the Bush which follows him as he tries to end the practice.

== Documentary ==
- Drawn from Water ... Interviewee - 2012
- Omo Child: The River and the Bush - Himself - 2015
