= Joshua: Teenager vs. Superpower =

2017 Hong Kong film by Joe Piscatella

- Directed by: Joe Piscatella
- Starring: Joshua Wong
- Release date: 20 January 2017
- Running time: 79 minutes
- Country: Hong Kong
- Languages: English; Cantonese

Joshua: Teenager vs. Superpower is a 2017 documentary directed by Joe Piscatella about Joshua Wong, a teenager who rallies Hong Kong youth in dissent during the 2014 Hong Kong Occupy Movement when the Chinese Communist Party reneged on its promise of autonomy to the territory. At Sundance, Netflix negotiated worldwide viewing rights for the documentary. The film premiered at the 2017 Sundance Film Festival at the Park City Temple Theatre in Sundance's World Documentary Competition. The film was released on Netflix on 26 May 2017.

== Synopsis ==
The documentary follows the activism of Joshua Wong, a young political leader from Hong Kong, as he rises to prominence while leading youth protests against the Chinese government. The film is set against the backdrop of the 2014 Umbrella Movement, where Joshua and thousands of Hong Kong citizens fought to preserve the city's democratic freedoms. The film chronicles Joshua's journey from his early involvement as a teenager in Scholarism, a student activist group that successfully opposed Beijing's attempt to impose a pro-Chinese "national education" curriculum in Hong Kong schools, to his leadership role in the broader fight for universal suffrage.

Joshua's activism becomes a symbol of resistance against China's increasing control over Hong Kong. As China reneges on its promise of political autonomy, Joshua mobilizes his peers and leads massive peaceful protests to demand free elections. The documentary highlights not only Joshua's leadership but also the political tensions in Hong Kong as it grapples with the pressures from mainland China. The film portrays Joshua as a resilient figure, embodying the aspirations of a generation fighting for democracy against overwhelming odds, and sheds light on the power of youth-led movements and the complexities of Hong Kong's political landscape.

== Cast ==
The cast features:

- Joshua Wong
- Agnes Chow
- Nathan Law
- Alex Chow
- Benny Tai

== Awards and nominations ==
- World Cinema Audience Award in the 'Documentary' category at the 2017 Sundance Film Festival
- Producers Guild of America Award (nominated)

== Reception ==
On the review aggregator website Rotten Tomatoes, 93% of 14 critics' reviews are positive, with an average rating of 8.4/10.

== See also ==
- Umbrella Revolution
- List of TV and films critical of Chinese Communist Party
