= 2014 Hong Kong class boycott campaign =

Student protest in Hong Kong

The yellow ribbon is seen as the symbol of this campaign.

The 2014 Hong Kong class boycott campaign, also known as 922 Class Boycott and 926 Class Boycott, was a student strike protesting the PRC Standing Committee of the National People's Congress's restriction on nomination system of the election of the Chief Executive in the 2016 and 2017 Hong Kong Political Reform. The campaign, jointly organised by the Hong Kong Federation of Students and Scholarism, was participated in by university students from 22 to 26 September and later also by secondary school students on 26 September. The student movement evolved into the 2014 Hong Kong protests in which several regions across the Victoria Harbour were occupied by pro-democracy protesters.

== Background ==
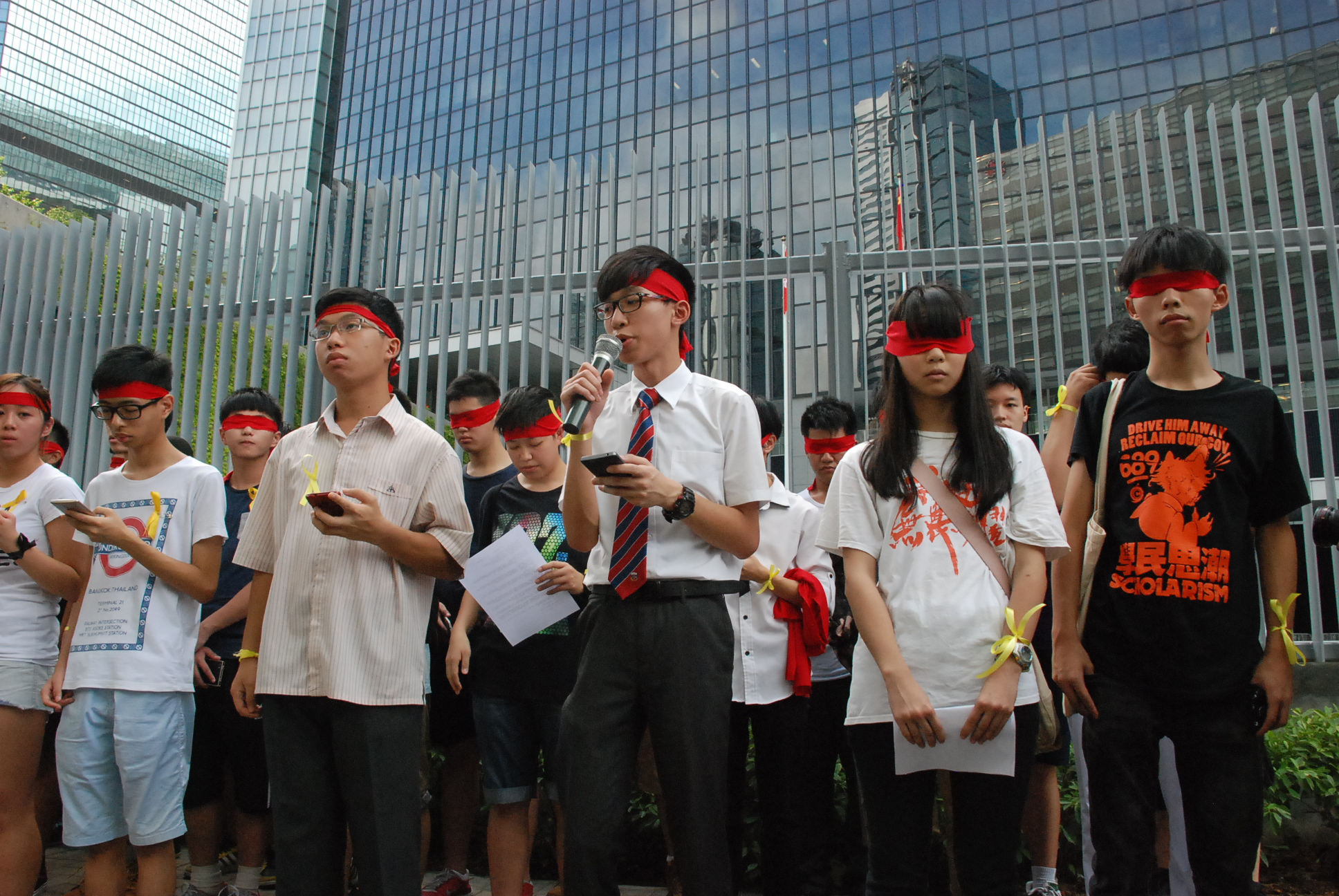
The arrangement of the 926 Class Boycott being announced by Scholarism

On 31 August 2014, the Standing Committee of the National People's Congress (NPCSC) of the PRC announced its decision on the electoral reform: although universal suffrage was introduced, the Nominating Committee under the new framework would be inherited without change from the 1200-member Election Committee in the previous system. Hong Kong students were dissatisfied of the framework, feeling it is too conservative and restrictive. Two student groups, the Hong Kong Federation of Students (HKFS) and Scholarism, initiated a class boycott aimed at students in 24 higher education institutions and hundreds of secondary schools on 22 and 26 September respectively, to object the decision of the NPCSC and seek its accountability to citizens and students.

In July 2014, Alex Chow Yong-kang, Secretary-General of the HKFS, stated that if the NPCSC rejected civil nomination or maintained the current Nominating Committee structure, the HKFS would call for a class boycott in September 2014 in order to demonstrate the extent of civil discontent over the HKSAR government. When the decision of the NPCSC was announced, Alex Chow reiterated that the purpose of the class boycott is to call for all members of society in Hong Kong to reflect on how much they are willing to give for a better place to live in. A "Class Boycott Committee" was formed by faculty staff from 14 universities and 328 higher-education, while several alumni organisations issued a joint declaration in support of the class boycott. 108 academics agreed to hold "Seminar on Democracy" with the protesters between Tuesday and Friday. Some other student organisations went onto the streets to support the class boycott.

Scholarism organised a demonstration outside the Central Government Offices on 13 September 2014. Protesters wearing yellow ribbon and blind-folded with red cloth declared class boycott by secondary schools on 26 September to echo the wider class boycott movement. The fact that it tried to influence secondary school students to go on strike caused some resistance from society. In response to the criticisms, Scholarism held a number of meetings with secondary school parents to explain the motivation behind the event and urged students to seek agreement from parents before attending the boycott. It also appealed to students to attend forums discussing the electoral reform, organise concern groups on electoral reforms, distribute yellow ribbons and pamphlets outside schools, and set up booths on the streets. While Scholarism stated that several secondary schools were in support of the strike, it asked schools to respect the students' freedom to participate in political activities.

== Chronology ==
=== 22 September ===
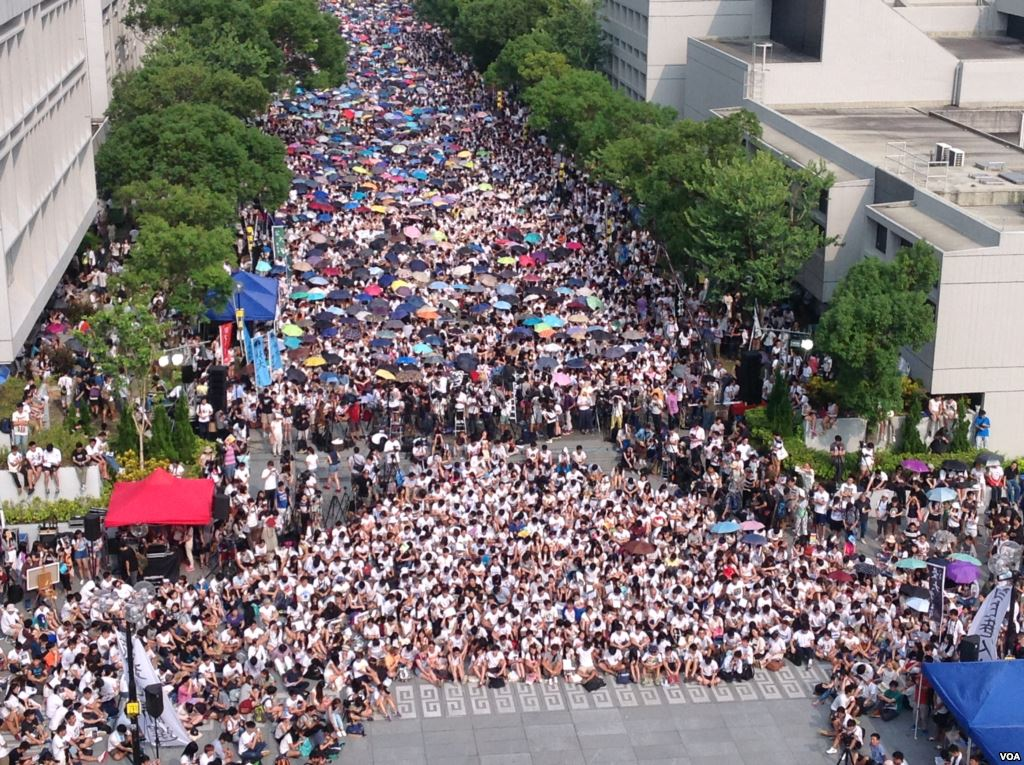
The scene of class boycott at the University Mall, CUHK

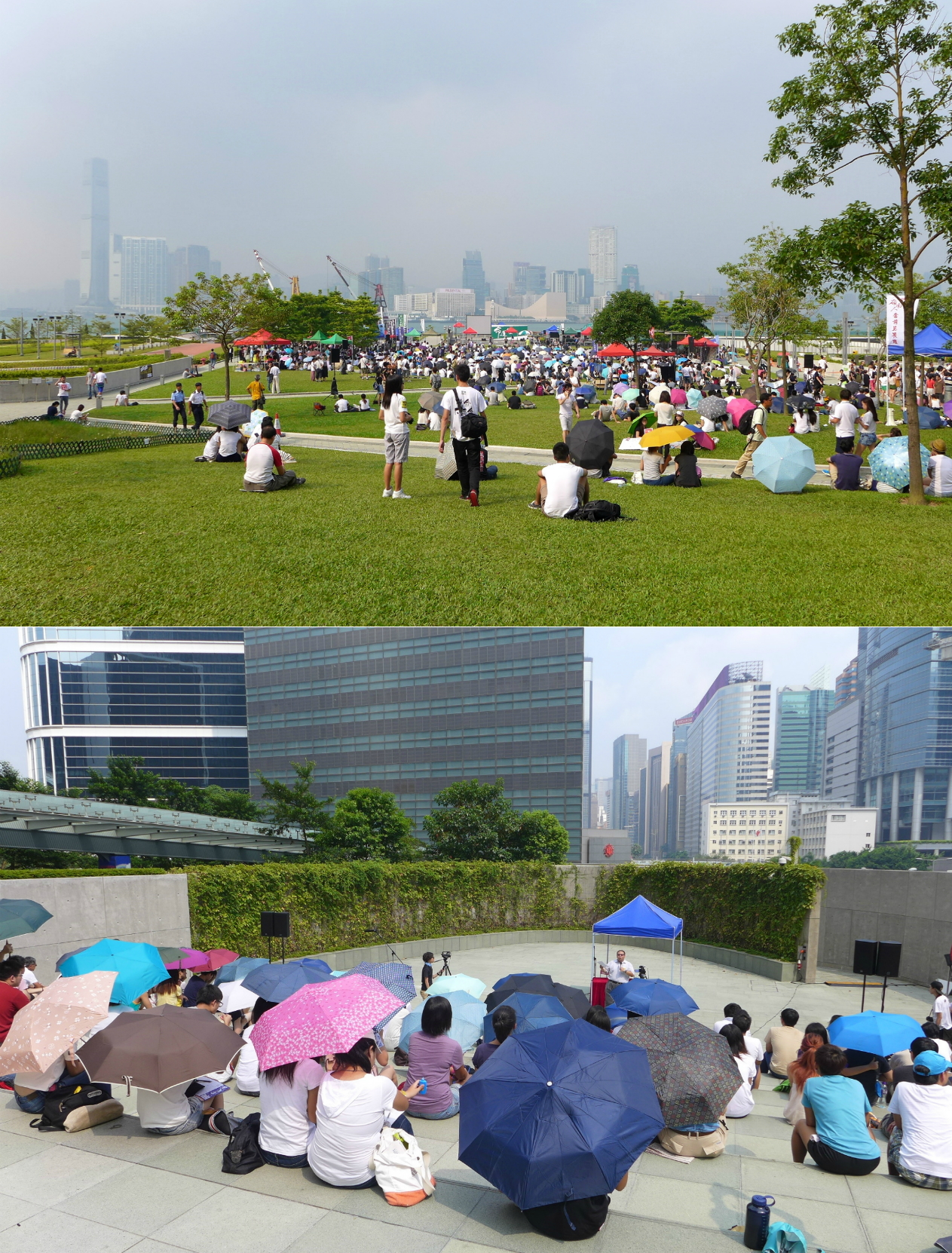
The class boycott moved to the Tamar Park in Admiralty between 23 and 25 September.

University teachers and tertiary students across Hong Kong wearing white shirts and yellow ribbons gathered at the University Mall (百萬大道), Chinese University of Hong Kong (CUHK). At 2:20 p.m., Alex Chow, the Secretary-General of the HKFS, officially declared the start of the class boycott. He questioned why the future of 7 million Hong Kong people was not determined by themselves, but by the 170 handpicked members of the NPCSC. He stated that students in higher education institution should shoulder the civil and social responsibilities of Hong Kong, and live up to the hope of society by solving the social crisis. He also stated that as long as the Chinese Government and tycoons monopolised Hong Kong politics, livelihood problems would remain unsolved. HKFS demanded the government to:

1. Establish civil nomination as a valid nomination method for the 2017 Chief Executive election;
2. Start to reform of the Legislative Council (LegCo), abolishing all functional constituency seats;
3. Make an official apology to the Hong Kong people, and withdraw the injustice resolution on the electoral reform;
4. Otherwise, principal officials responsible for the electoral reform including CY Leung, Carrie Lam, Rimsky Yuen and Raymond Tam should be held accountable and resign.

Yvonne Leung, the President of the Hong Kong University Students' Union, expressed that the class boycott might escalate into an indefinite protest, depending on the response from the Government. Teachers and students gave speeches one after another. At 5:30 p.m., organisers of the campaign invited academics to give lessons on civil issues to the participants, in order to put into practice "Boycott Classes, Continue Learning", including Choy Chi-Keung, Andrew To, Tam Chun-yin, Daisy Chan, Chow Po-chung and Bruce Lui etc. The first day of the strike ended with a film shown at 7:00 p.m. According to announcement made by HKFS, 13,000 people had joined the rally.

=== 23–25 September ===
The Class Boycott campaign was moved to Tamar Park in Admiralty. 108 Scholars also responded to the call and started the Civic auditorium. On the second day of the boycott, HKFS held a rally at night and indicated about 2,000 people had attended. Alex Chow Yong-kang, the Secretary of HKFS, expressed that he was not disappointed with the number of participants since it was only the second day of the boycott.

On the fourth day of the boycott, HKFS had another rally and announced 5,000 people participated. More and more people joined the rally after the nightfall and almost filled the entire Tamar Park. After the end of rally at about 21:30, HKFS launched a march to the Government House without any applications of the notice of no objection from the police force. Along the march, there were slogans protesting NPC's restriction on the nomination and the Chief Executive, CY Leung, not answering the students before deadline. Before the march, HKFS reminded the march had not been approved and protesters might have the risk of being arrested. Citizens were able to forward their Chinese and English name and contact numbers to the organiser for assistance if being arrested.

=== 26 September ===
The Class Boycott campaign was held on Tim Mei Avenue and the square outside the Legislative Council Complex, because an organisation applied to hold a celebration event of 65th anniversary of the People's Republic China at the Tamar Park. It is also the day on which Scholarism hosted the class boycott movement for secondary school students. Joshua Wong, leading activist of Scholarism, pronounced the boycott statement. It was followed by a lecture held by Benjamin Au Yeung Wai Hoo, Senior Lecturer from department of Chinese, Chinese University of Hong Kong. The host mentioned there was 1,500 secondary school student joined the boycott movement. Total number of participants reached 3,000.

After the dusk, Hong Kong Federation of Students (HKFS) held the last gathering at Tim Mei Avenue and square outside Legislative Council Complex. Large number of people entered the assembly site though the bridge connecting Admiralty Centre and the Government Headquarters leading to MTR Admiralty station. The assembly started at 8 p.m with a sharing session by Joshua Wong, a secondary school student under the pseudonym "Gary" and senior members from HKFS. The meeting also showed three videos filmed by artist Anthony Wong Yiu Ming, students activists from Macau and Taiwan activist Lin Fei-fan, one of the leaders of Sunflower Student Movement, in support of the event.

The assembly ended at 10 p.m. It was scheduled for a film sharing session by Anita Lee Chi Kwan, Assistant Professor of Languages and General Education Center, Tung Wah College, in a planned exchange with Margaret Ng. The organisers, however, postponed the session because of technical reason and the stage was handed over to Joshua Wong. At 10:30 p.m., Joshua Wong called for the crowd to "retake" the Civic Square, around which fences were built two months earlier. Led by members of HKFS, hundred of protesters climbed across fences and tore down the barriers around the flag stage. The police surrounded hundreds of protesters, and then further mobilised towards the Civic Square and clashed with the protesters. The police pepper-sprayed them and displayed their batons. In chaos, it was reported a protester was having a heart attack. The police force originally refused to let the medics enter, and later permitted under the protesters pressure. At 10:52 p.m. police handcuffed and arrested Joshua Wong for forcible entry to government premises, disorderly conduct in public place and unlawful assembly. As visible wounds were found, he was sent to Ruttonjee Hospital for medical inspections before sent to the Central Police station. Many people on site were sent to the hospital because of injuries or feeling unwell. The police and protesters fell into stalemate later on.

The organiser announced the start of civil disobedience, and reminded participants to uninstall communication software from their phones. They also encouraged the protesters to send their personal information to the HKFS secretariat in order to receive legal support.

This raid was planned in secret. Neither the media nor the students were notified. According to Ming Pao's report, which summarised information provided by HKFS, Scholarism and protesters, this raid was proposed by HKFS and Scholarism a few days before its implementation on 26 September. Hundreds of participants were notified secretly two hours before the operation, gathered at the car park outside the Legislative Council Complex and the Central Government Offices around 10:15 p.m., and then raided the Civic Square once instructed.

== Aftermaths ==
After the raid on the Civic Square, HKFS announced they would continue the assembly and called up more people to join them. HKFS indicated that 50,000 participants were at the assembly at night (excluding those counter-enclosing the venue from the outside). Later, police arrested the host of the assembly and cleared the stage.

Overnight, riot police were deployed as protesters blocked the roads to stop police reinforcements from reaching the Central Government Offices. Police used peppar spray, against which the protesters defended themselves with umbrellas. Umbrella would later become a symbol of the occupation protest. Police surrounded the Civic Square not to allow any protesters to enter or exit it.

By 1pm, police cleared the Civic Square and arrested protesters occupying there, including Leung Kwok-hung, legislator and chairman of the League of Social Democrats, Alex Chow and Lester Shum, Secretary-General and Deputy Secretary-General of HKFS. Altogether, 61 protesters were arrested for forcible entry into government premises and unlawful assembly.

At night, HKFS and Scholarism organised another assembly. Having declared the assembly unlawful, police blockaded Exit A of Admiralty MTR station and bridges outside the Central Office Complex until the size of the crowd caused the police to lift the blockade.

At 1:30 am, 28 September, Benny Tai, co-initiator of the Occupy Central with Love and Peace movement, declared the official launch of the "Occupy Central" campaign. In the afternoon, as more and more people flooded to Admiralty in support of the students, the police completely blockaded the access to the government headquarters. Later, the protesters began to occupy Harcourt Road which police responded by using tear gas, triggering widespread occupations at Admiralty, Mong Kok and Causeway Bay.

The federation later disclosed that it had spent HK$332,000 ($42,500) to finance the boycott activities.

== Government feedback ==
On 5 September, government officials commented on the class boycott campaign. The Chief Executive of HKSAR, Leung Chun-ying expressed that people should remain calm and try to understand the political reform suggested by the Standing Committee of the National People's Congress in a prudent manner. "The Universal Suffrage for Chief Executive is a step forward and the voting right should be appreciated," he said. After the class boycott campaign being launched, Leung made no promises on whether he would be meeting the students. On 15 September, the Chief Secretary for Administration, Carrie Lam and the Secretary for Education, Eddie Ng called a meeting with presidents and vice-chancellors of the eight local universities, in which they discussed the "Occupy Central" demonstration and class boycott campaign. Ms. Lam denied giving pressure on university presidents and claimed that the Government would not interfere with students' activities as long as they were legal and rational. As for secondary school students, the Government held the same stance as some education institutions that under-aged students should not participate in the class boycott campaign.

== See also ==
- 2014 Hong Kong protests
- Umbrella Movement
- 2019–20 Hong Kong protests
- List of protests in the 21st century
