= Chris Patrick-Simpson =

Northern Irish actor (born 1979)

- Occupation: Actor
- Years active: 2002–present

Chris Patrick-Simpson is a Northern Irish actor. Patrick-Simpson is best known for his role as Brendan in the film The Magdalene Sisters. He has also appeared in the film The Boxer, the TV Drama The Clinic and Fifty Dead Men Walking. He is married and currently in Canada.

== Career ==
In 2018, he guest-starred in an episode of The CW series Supernatural.

== Filmography ==
Film and Television
Year	Title	Role	Notes
2002	The Magdalene Sisters	Brendan	
2003	The Clinic	Alex's Gay Friend	Episode: "1.4"
2005	Mating Rituals	Mick	Short film
2005	Hamlet	Laertes	
2008	Fifty Dead Men Walking	Tortured Tout	
2010	The Guards	Malachy O'Neill	Television film
2010	The Fabulous Food Adventure	Narrator	Episode: "2.1"; Episode: "2.2"
2011	Hitler on Trial	Helmut	Television film, post-production
2014	Mrs. Brown's Boys D'Movie	Ninja Joe	Film
2018	Supernatural	Neil	Episode: "Nightmare Logic"
2018	Unquiet Graves	UDR Man 1	Documentary film
