= Plastic China =

- Promotional poster
- Directed by: Jiu-Liang Wang
- Produced by: Ruby Chen; Benjamin Guan-ting Tue; Jing Liu
- Cinematography: Jiu-Liang Wang
- Edited by: Bob Lee; Jean Tsien
- Music by: Tyler Strickland
- Production companies: CNEX; Beijing TYC; Oriental Companion Media
- Distributed by: CNEX; Beijing; Journeyman Pictures
- Release date: November 16, 2016 (International Documentary Festival Amsterdam)
- Running time: 81 minutes
- Languages: Yi; Mandarin Chinese

Plastic China (simplified Chinese: 塑料王国; traditional Chinese: 塑料王國) is a 2016 Chinese documentary film depicting the lives of two families who make their living recycling plastic waste imported from developed countries. The film premiered at the International Documentary Film Festival Amsterdam in November 2016, and was shown at the 2017 Sundance Film Festival.
