= Moral and National Education controversy =

2012 Hong Kong school curriculum

Moral and national education
- Traditional Chinese: 德育及國民敎育
- Simplified Chinese: 德育及国民敎育
Transcriptions
Standard Mandarin
- Hanyu Pinyin: Déyù jí guómín jiàoyù
Yue: Cantonese
- Jyutping: Dak1juk6 kap6 gwok3man4 gaau3juk6

Moral and civic education
- Chinese: 德育及公民敎育
Transcriptions
Standard Mandarin
- Hanyu Pinyin: Déyù jí gōngmín jiàoyù
Yue: Cantonese
- Jyutping: Dak1juk6 kap6 gung1man4 gaau3juk6

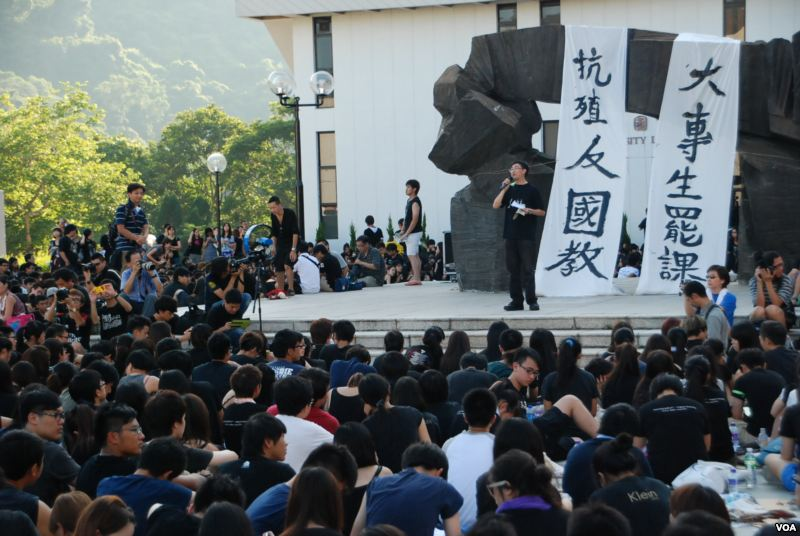
Students at the Chinese University boycotting classes in protest of the moral and national education curriculum

Moral and national education (MNE), initially known as Moral and civic education (MCE), was a school curriculum proposed by the Education Bureau of Hong Kong in 2012.

The subject was controversial for its stance on the Chinese Communist Party and criticism of the United States' two-party system.

== Background ==
Moral and civic education was one of the four key tasks in the 2001 curriculum reform undertaken by the Education and Manpower Bureau (superseded by the Education Bureau in 2007), and its framework was revised by the Education Bureau in 2008.

On 13 October 2010, Chief Executive Donald Tsang stated in the "Policy Address 2010–2011" that moral and national education would replace MCE to "strengthen national education". The government planned to introduce the new subject in primary schools in 2012 and secondary schools in 2013, and carried out a four-month consultation in 2011. Following the opposition from the public, the government postponed the commencement of the subject indefinitely.

== Curriculum ==
According to the revised Moral and National Education Curriculum Guide (Primary 1 to Secondary 6) (MNE Guide) published in June 2012, the subject has the following aims:

- Development of moral qualities
- Development of a positive and optimistic attitude
- Self-recognition
- Judging in a caring and reasonable manner
- Recognition of identity
- Practice

== Controversy ==
=== Necessity ===
Education Bureau (EB) claims that Moral, Civic and National Education is "an essential element of whole-person education which aims at fostering students' positive values and attitudes through the school curriculum and the provision of diversified learning experiences". It also claims to "enhance" students' commitments and contributions to analyse and judge personal, family, social, national and global issues.

Since 2001, Moral and Civic Education has been accorded as one of the four Key Tasks under the Curriculum Reform to cultivate students' positive values and attitudes (Priority values include "Perseverance", "Respect for Others", "Responsibility", "National Identity" and "Commitment"). It has been suggested "life event" exemplars being used as learning contexts to enable students to realise positive values.

The Hong Kong Professional Teachers' Union (PTU), an organisation formed by different levels of teachers, believes that MNE is unnecessary, as the original civic education curriculum had already contained "national education". Its vice president Cheung Man-kwong claims that introduction of MNE is a political action ordered by the central government of the People's Republic of China.

=== Partiality of teaching materials ===
The "China Model National Conditions Teaching Manual", published by the National Education Services Centre under government funding, was found to be biased towards the Chinese Communist Party and the "China model". The teaching manual called the Communist Party an "advanced, selfless and united ruling group" (進步、無私與團結的執政集團), while denouncing Democratic and Republican Parties of the United States as a "fierce inter-party rivalry [that] makes the people suffer" (政黨惡鬥，人民當災).

== Pressure groups and protests ==
Occupy Tamar
- Date: 30 August – 8 September 2012
- Location: Admiralty
- Methods: Occupations, sit-ins, internet activism, hunger strikes, hacking

Parties
Civil Alliance Against the National Education: Scholarism; National Education Parents' Concern Group; Hong Kong Alliance in Support of Patriotic Democratic Movements in China; Hong Kong Federation of Students; Civil Human Rights Front; Pan-democracy camp; Hacking groups: Anonymous	Authorities: Hong Kong SAR government; Chinese Communist Party; Pro-Beijing camp

Lead figures
Joshua Wong	CY Leung; Eddie Ng

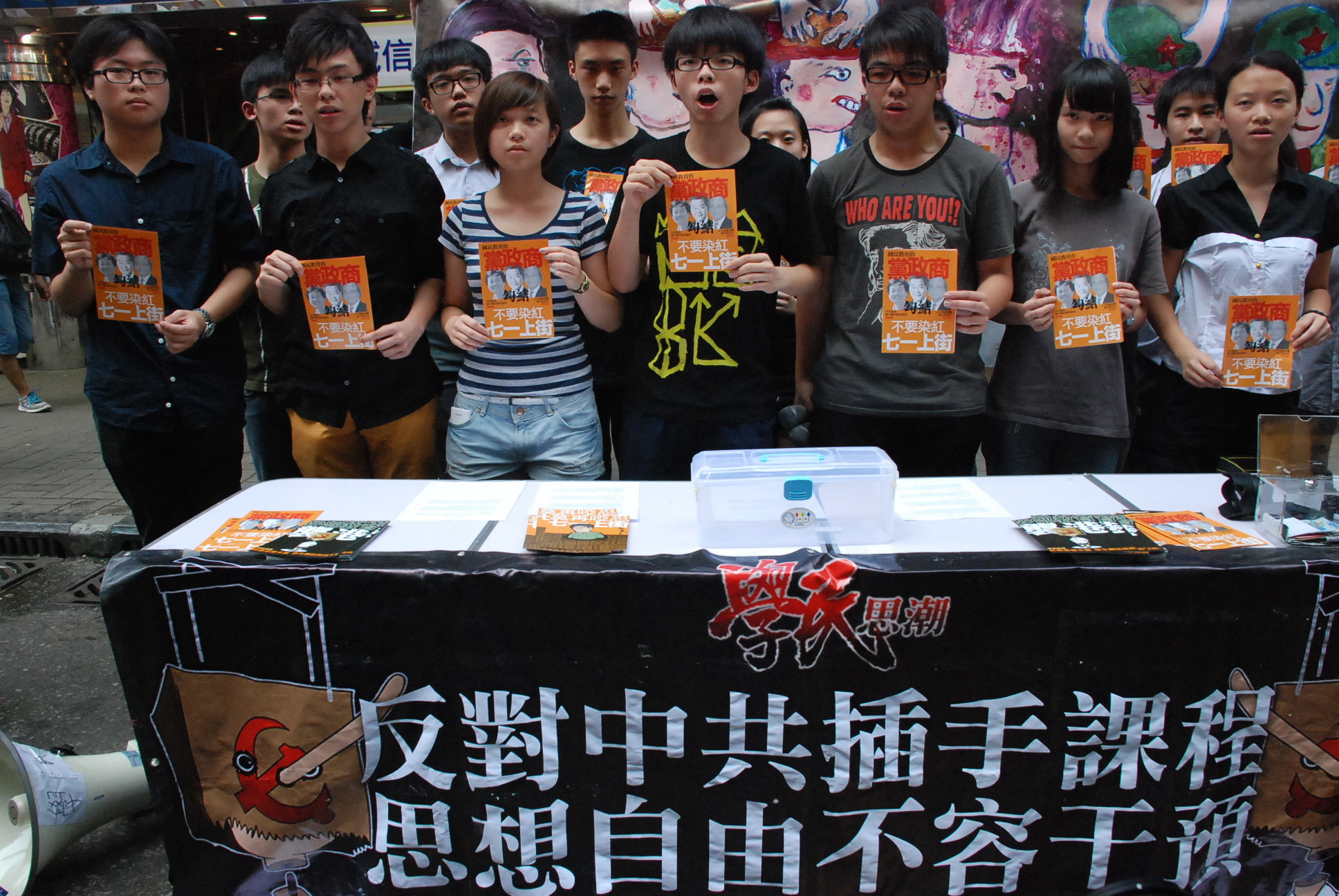
Scholarism appealed to the public for participation in the 1 July march of 2012.

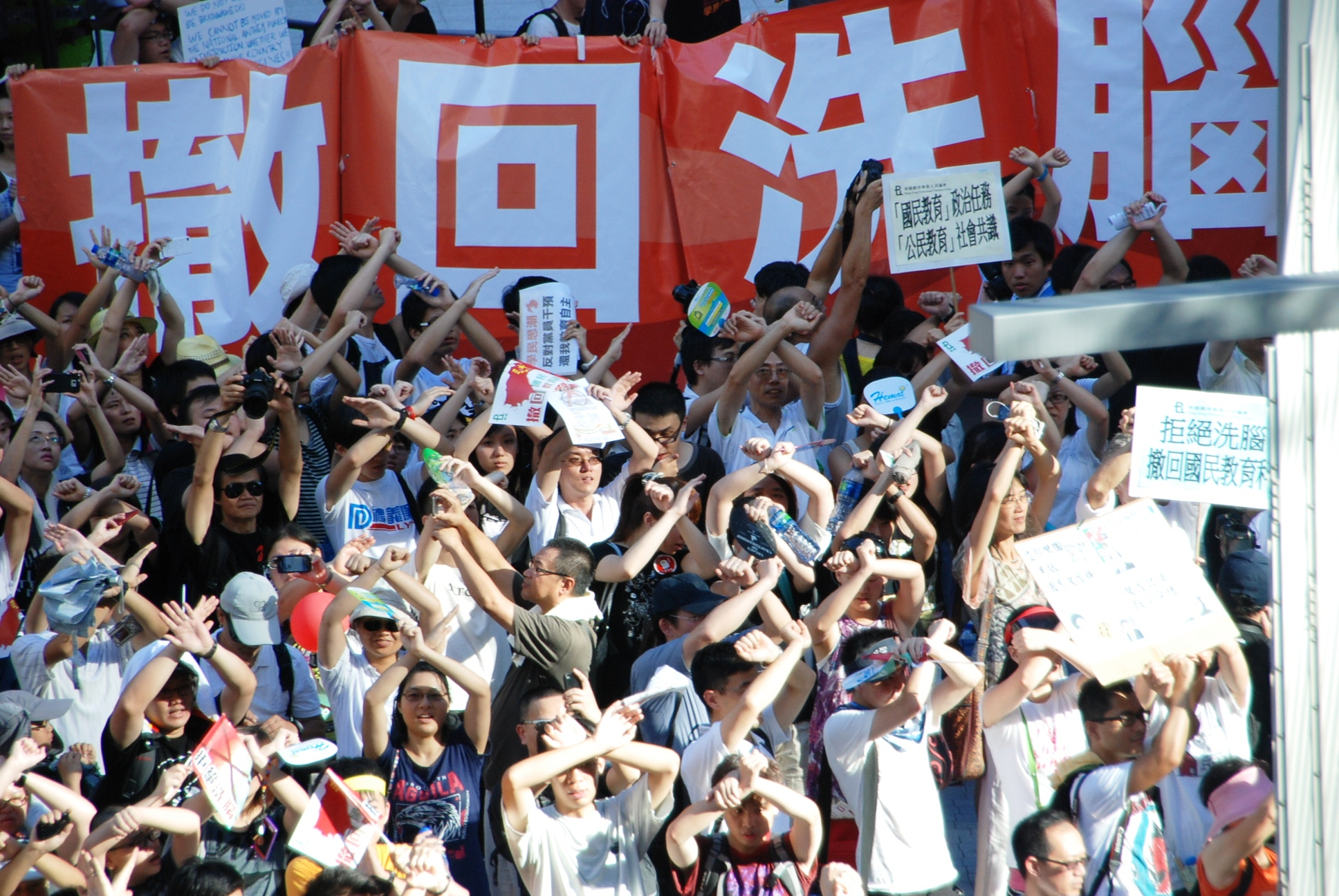
Protest against implementation of national education on 29 July 2012

"Scholarism – The Alliance Against Moral & National Education" (later renamed "Scholarism", 學民思潮) was founded by a group of secondary school students on 29 May 2011, with no political affiliations. Scholarism is the first pressure group formed and has become the leading organisation against MNE. The group is known for being one of the few organisations that protested outside the Central Government Liaison Office after the 1 July March 2012.

Another prominent pressure group, the National Education Parents' Concern Group (Parents' Concern Group, 國民教育家長關注組) was formed in July 2012. The group issued a petition opposing to MNE, initiated by Cardinal Joseph Zen, Ching Cheong, Allen Lee and 27 other public figures, and co-signed by more than 1000 parents.

In July 2012, the "Civil Alliance Against the National Education" (民間反對國民教育科大聯盟) was formed by 15 organisations, including Scholarism, Parents' Concern Group, PTU, Hong Kong Federation of Students, Alliance Youth, Civil Human Rights Front and others.

On 29 July 2012, 30 organisations protested in a march. According to the organisers, over 90000 protestors, including parents and their children, joined in this march.

Scholarism began their occupation of the Hong Kong government headquarters on 30 August 2012. Fifty members occupied the public park beneath the government offices, of which three began a hunger strike. The goal of the protest was, expressly, to compel the government to pull back its plans of Moral and National Education. The initial planned length of the occupation was three days. On 1 September, an open concert was held as part of the protest, with an attendance of 40,000; guest performers at the protest include RubberBand, C AllStar, Wong Ka Keung, Anthony Wong and others. During the event the three hunger-strikers ended their hunger strike, and were succeeded by a team of ten other hunger-strikers.

The occupation of the government headquarters area exceeded the initial three-day duration, and on 3 September 2012 the Civil Alliance Against National Education announced that they would continue their occupation of the government headquarters area indefinitely. On 7 September, up to 120,000 attendees, including retired legislator Martin Lee, Cardinal Joseph Zen and businessman Jimmy Lai, attended the demonstration outside the government headquarters, filling the entire North Admiralty area; police said there were 36,000 attendees at 9.30 pm.

In mid-September 2012, Anonymous hackers threatened the Hong Kong government organisation National Education Services Centre. In their online video, Anonymous members claimed responsibility for leaking classified government documents and taking down the National Education Centre website after the Hong Kong government repeatedly ignored months of wide-scale protests against the establishment of the subject.

On September 8, Chief Executive Leung Chun-ying announced that he would temporary withdraw introducing the national education course, until the revising of the Moral, Civil and National education guidelines which has caused many concerns to many Hongkongers, has been addressed.

Resistance to the MNE was documented in the 2014 film, Lessons in Dissent.

== Current status ==
As of 2017, the current secretary for education, Kevin Yeung Yun-hung, said recently that national education had not been scrapped completely. Teaching on the topic was continuing in the form of different subjects and activities in schools. For example, the inclusion of a new requirement for all schools to provide 39 hours of Basic Law education at the junior secondary level, or plans to make Chinese history a compulsory subject at senior secondary level.

== See also ==
- List of protests in the 21st century
- Education in China
