= Omo Child: The River and the Bush =

- Directed by: John Rowe
- Produced by: John Rowe
- Starring: Lale Labuko
- Cinematography: Niels Lindelin; Sebastian Humphreys; Ally Rybiki; Nicholas Wiesnet; Jordan Raabe
- Edited by: Matt Skow
- Music by: Eric Poline
- Distributed by: Journeyman Pictures
- Release date: February 25, 2015 (United States)
- Running time: 89 minutes
- Countries: United States, Ethiopia
- Language: English

Omo Child: The River and the Bush is a documentary film by John Rowe. It is about a young man who is on a quest to get tribes to change their beliefs and traditions. Namely their beliefs about curses. One tribe in particular had a custom of killing children that were believed to be cursed.

== About the film ==
The film is set in the Omo River valley in Ethiopia. Children who are thought to be cursed are killed because it is believed that they can bring disease, famine, and death to the tribes. Lale Labuko, an educated man, decided to challenge the tradition that had been around for a long time.

=== Awards and distribution ===
Awards

As of October 2015, the film had managed to pick up 24 awards around the world.

Distribution

Journeyman Pictures, a London-based distributor has the worldwide rights to the film.

== Further ==
Director John Rowe and Lale Labuko founded the Omo Child Organization to house rescued children. As of September 2015, they had housed 33 of these children.
