= Journeyman Pictures =

UK-based film distribution company

Journeyman Pictures Ltd
- Type: Privately held company
- Founder: Mark Stucke
- Headquarters: United Kingdom
- Website: journeyman.tv

Journeyman Pictures Ltd is a film distribution company based in the United Kingdom. The company works as an independent sales agent for producers of short current affairs, broadcast and feature-length films, both non-fiction and fiction.

== History ==
Journeyman Pictures was established in 1990 by managing director and former video journalist Mark Stucke.

The earliest titles distributed by the company are short reports from war zones and areas of conflict in the late 1980s to the early 2000s, produced and directed by Mark Stucke. These include the 1991 report The Fall of Duhok, on the Iraqi regime's retaliation to Kurdish rebels, Massacre - a report on the Bor Massacre in South Sudan featuring an interview with suspected perpetrator Riek Machar, and a 1996 report on the cannibalistic supporters of Charles Taylor in Liberia's civil war - The Cannibals' War.

Journeyman Pictures releases films across all platforms and territories simultaneously, as opposed to a traditional distribution model starting with a limited theatrical release.

== Filmography ==
Journeyman Pictures distributes hundreds of broadcast and feature-length documentaries, and thousands of short reports.

=== Productions ===
- Olim (Israel/Palestine, 1991)
- Hamas - Tip of the Dagger (Israel/Palestine, 1991)
- PKK Fighters (Turkey, 1991)
- Hamas - Islam and the PLO (Israel/Palestine, 1991)
- Kashmir (India, 1991)
- State of the Talib (Afghanistan, 2001)
- War Legacy (Angola, 2002)
- Sarajevo Under Siege (Bosnia and Herzegovina, 1992)
- Pol Pot's Legacy (Cambodia, 1995)
- Trading in Death (China, 1995)
- Legacy of Hate (Eastern Europe, 2000)
- The Fear and the Faith (Egypt, 1995)
- Volkswagen - Hitler's Car (Germany, 1997)
- Iran bombs Iraq (Islamic Republic of Iran, 1993)
- Marsh Arabs and Iraqi Human Rights (Iraq, 1992)
- Kurds after the Gulf War (Iraq, 1993)
- The Promised Land? (Israel/Palestine, 1996)
- Eastern Dawn (Eastern Europe, 1998)
- Of Blood and History (Kosovo, 1999)
- No Peace for Hizbollah (Lebanon, 1993)
- The Peacekeepers War (Liberia, 1992)
- Monrovia (Liberia, 1996)
- Gaddafi's 25 Years in Power (Libyan Arab Jamahiriya, 1994)
- Stolen Children (Mozambique, 1994)
- The Fall of Manerplaw (Myanmar, 1992)
- Khun Sa Opium Warlord (Myanmar, 1994)
- 32 Battalion South Africa Defense Force (Namibia, 1989)
- Oil Turmoil (Nigeria, 1999)
- Nightmare Behind the Veil (Pakistan, 1993)
- Media (Somalia, 1993)
- Children of the Revolution (South Africa, 1990)
- St Gregory College: Fruits of Freedom (South Africa, 1995)
- Sudan Jihad (Sudan, 1992)
- Koranic School (Sudan, 1994)
- The Harsher Face of Islam (Sudan, 1994)
- Nuba Mountains (Sudan, 1995)
- Training Terrorists (Sudan, 1996)
- Under Siege (Sudan, 1996)
- Tibet's Last Stand (Tibet, 1995)
- A New Kurdish War (Turkey, 1992)
- Kurdish Satellite Wars (Turkey, 1996)
- Kurds Caught in the Crossfire (Turkey, 1996)
- Belfast - No Peace on the Streets (UK, 1993)
- Newbury: Wars of the British Tree People (UK, 1996)
- The War Business (World, 1997)
- Shackled Women (World, 2001)
- The Global Addiction (World, 1999)
- Globalisation: The Haves and Have Nots (World, 2000)
- The Islamic Wave (World, 2000)
- The Global Trade Debate (World, 2002)
- Tukdam: Between Worlds (Nepal, 2022)
- Off the Rails (United Kingdom, 2022)
- James & Isey (New Zealand, 2022)
- Milked (New Zealand, 2022)
- Tantura (Israel/Palestine, 2022)
- Myanmar: The Forgotten Revolution (Myanmar, 2022)
- Was Tun (Bangladesh, 2022)
- This Stained Dawn (Pakistan, 2022)
- Lady Buds (United States, 2022)
- Cold Case Hammarskjöld (Zambia, 2022)

=== Film distribution - notable titles ===
- Finders Keepers (United States, 2015)
- The Future of Work and Death (World, 2016)
- King Leopold's Ghost (Democratic Republic of Congo, 2011)
- Omo Child (Ethiopia, 2015)
- Oxyana (United States, 2013)
- Plastic China (China, 2017)
- Return to Homs (Syria, 2013)
- Rich Hill (US, 2014)
- The Weight of Chains (Serbia, 2010)
- Seven Dumpsters and a Corpse (Switzerland, 2007)
- Sidik and the Panther (Kurdistan, 2019)
- Stroop: Journey into the Rhino Horn War (South Africa, 2018)
- Unquiet Graves (Northern Ireland, 2018)
- Never Surrender: A Galaxy Quest Documentary (United States, 2019)

== Controversy ==
An episode of ABC's Four Corners concerning the Russo-Ukrainian war produced by Journeyman that aired on ABC Television in March 2024 was labelled as pro-Kremlin propaganda by Ukrainian ambassador to Australia Vasyl Myroshnychenko, who called it a "journalistical equivalent of a bowl of vomit". After generating criticism on social media for enabling the ABC to broadcast a possible pro-Russian view of events, the corporation announced that it was setting up an appointment with Myroshnychenko to express his concerns.
