= Civic Square (Hong Kong) =

Public square in Hong Kong

Coordinates: 22.2804°N 114.1662°E

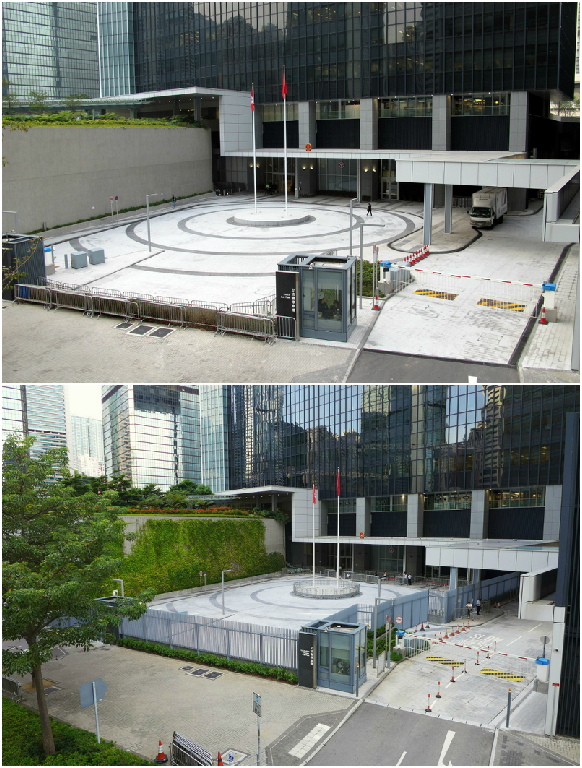
The East Wing Forecourt in 2012 VS 2014

The East Wing Forecourt of the Central Government Office, or Civic Square, is an open space in front of the East Wing of the Central Government Complex, Hong Kong, which is located in Tamar. It was once an area where protesters took part in protests and demonstrations. It was closed in July 2014, and reopened on 10 September 2014. For many, it represents democracy and freedom, and a place to express their discontent. It was occupied for a rally opposing the moral and national education school curriculum proposal in August 2012, and during the 2014 Hong Kong protests (Umbrella Revolution) in September 2014. Since then, the square is closed by the government in order to prevent protests.

== Source of name ==
It has been called the Civil Square, or the Civic Square, since the Anti-National Education Campaign in September 2012. The 'Civic Education Commencement Ceremony' was held in Tamar Park on 1 September 2012. Later on, the Civil Alliance Against the National Education (民間反對國民教育科大聯盟) suggested to remain in the East Wing Forecourt of the Central Government Office until the government responded. In the meantime, the volunteers and the Civil Alliance decided to call the Forecourt 'The Civil Square', in order to express their willing on this issue. The name has been generally accepted and it has been in use since then.

== Events ==
=== Anti-national education campaign (August 2012 – October 2012) ===
On 8 September 2012, Education Bureau had planned to carry out moral and national education as a compulsory subject in the new school year and implement for three-year. Hong Kong Chief Executive Leung Chun-ying said schools could decide when to implement it within the next three years. On 8 September 2012, Leung Chun-ying announced the cancellation of the three-year period of Moral and national education. Schools can now decide whether to implement the course or not.

People in the Pro-Beijing camp think that the move was "international practice" and was necessary to improve the understanding of China;. The opposition argues that mandatory implementation of Moral and national education destroys schools' autonomy. In other words, that the course was a "brainwashing" education. Scholarism initiated a number of activities, such as Street Station, processions, signatory, rallies and hunger strikes in order to requires the Government to withdraw the Moral and national education. Civil Alliance Against the National Education (民間反對國民教育科大聯盟) was established in July 2012, to oppose the Government's implementation of Moral and national education.

On 30 August 2012, some Scholarism members and students occupied the Central Government Offices roundabout (Civil Square). This was where three Scholarism members started a hunger strike. On 3 September 2012, Scholarism and Civil Alliance Against the National Education (民間反對國民教育科大聯盟) officially announced an indefinite occupation of the Central Government Offices roundabout (Civil Square). Every day, more than 8,000 people participated in meetings after school. The number of people at the gatherings and meeting increased dramatically and reached a peak in the evening of 7 September 2012 .The Assembly said that more than 120 thousand people joined rallies in Civil Square, Tamar Park, Tim Mei Avenue, but police estimated that there were 30,006 participants.

The subject has aroused wide concerns in Hong Kong society. On 8 October 2012, the Government announced that it was shelving curriculum guidelines.

=== 2014 Hong Kong protest (September 2014 – present) ===
The 2014 Hong Kong protest is a democratic movement known as the Umbrella Movement. On 22 September, the Hong Kong Federation of Students and Scholarism started protesting outside the government headquarters. Later, on 28 September, Occupy Central with Love and Peace movement announced that they would begin their civil disobedience campaign immediately which was 'Occupy Central'. Protesters blocked both east–west arterial routes in northern Hong Kong Island near Admiralty and occupying Causeway Bay and Mong Kok. To stop the protest, police tactics (including the use of tear gas) and attacks on protesters by opponents that included triad members, had triggered more citizens to join the protests. For the government, they had set a deadline of 6 October which is hope that it can called for an end of the protest, but it was ignored by the protesters, and the movement are still running.

In this movement, yellow ribbon is one of the symbol. It was introduced because of 1 September Civil Human Rights Front in response to strong public dissatisfaction with the NPCSC stimulate political reform in Hong Kong 2016,2017 resolution, initiated a "power to the people, the implementation of universal suffrage" Yellow Ribbon action. Some people will be launched on the yellow ribbon tie around the railings way street in Hong Kong, there are many users on Facebook and other sites to black yellow ribbon to respond to the motion picture to picture. Another symbol is the umbrella for demonstrators hold on the principle of "peaceful and non-violent," the face of police action to disperse, the police do not have a strong impact on the defence, but with an umbrella to resist the police pepper spray. This is also Explaining the reasons for protest named "umbrella revolution" or "umbrella campaign" is.

For this movement, it also brings some influence to people. At retail aspect, Wheelock's Admiralty Gallery, since 28 September in the evening until the morning of 29 September more than the entrance closed, causing confusion wage earners to work, many commuters unified query to the security center. Sogo Causeway closed shop early 18:00. Hysan Place's management company Hennessy Road will be closed with iron railings front entrance. Over 20 Nathan Road, Mong Kok section size of jewellery shops closed down, which goldsmith retail chain stores to close a third of the territory of Chow Tai Fook, Nathan Road, Mong Kok, only the affected stores has reached 10. And a number of nearby electronics store chain also postponed until noon after another shop, pharmacy business has dropped nearly half, there is a chain of restaurants and bakeries also refers to the volume of business because businesses closed down and reduce downtime. However, there are newspaper vendors refers demonstrations but to make newspaper sales increase, boost business.

EDB also on 29 September, the 30th, and 2 October, respectively, announced the Central and Western District, Wan Chai, all kindergartens, primary and secondary schools and special schools will be closed. 5 October, the district Board of Education announced that all secondary schools reopened on 6 October, elementary school will also be reopened on 7 October.

== Response from stakeholders ==
=== Response from the government ===
On 22 October 2014, Chief Secretary Carrie Lam Cheng Yuet-ngor responded on the issue of Civil Square. She restated that the Central Government Offices East Wing forecourt is a government property that is neither a public place nor a public open space, and the public does not have an absolute right for free accessing. She claimed that forecourt was used as a vehicular access for the Central Government Offices, and it opened for public use on weekdays mainly as a passageway. In other words, the actions of protesters occupying the forecourt on 26 September were illegal.

=== Pan-democracy camp ===
On 3 November, Felix Chung, the new chieftain of Liberal Party said that he hopes the government can open the civil square free to public. He has mentioned that some students in the occupying areas have reached him and showed their willingness to give up occupying if the government can open the square.

=== Media ===
The media filed an application for judicial review court to challenge administrative Director of "drop gate" decision. They thought the civic square belongs to the public and the right of use should be on the public but not the government. The government has no right to close the square. They thought the cause of occupying civic square is the decision made by the government.

=== HKFS ===
The Hong Kong Federation of Students said they were willing to "exchange" Civic Square for other main roads in Admiralty. They agreed that the main purpose of occupying is not opposing the government but to fight for what we deserve to own and fight for our own rights.

== Changes ==
Access to Civic Square is now restricted with fencing and gate closing off the site to the public.
