= Scholarism =

Hong Kong pro-democracy student activist group

- 學民思潮
- Merged into: Demosisto
- Formation: 29 May 2011; 15 years ago
- Founder: Joshua Wong
- Dissolved: 20 March 2016; 10 years ago
- Type: Student activist group
- Headquarters: Hennessy Road, Wan Chai, Hong Kong Island
- Website: scholarism.com (archived)

Scholarism
- Traditional Chinese: 學民思潮
- Simplified Chinese: 学民思潮
- Literal meaning: Study Person Thought
Transcriptions
Standard Mandarin
- Hanyu Pinyin: Xuémín Sīcháo
Hakka
- Romanization: Hok^{6} Min^{2} Su^{1} Cau^{2}
Yue: Cantonese
- Yale Romanization: Hohk màhn sī chìuh
- Jyutping: Hok^{6} Man^{4} Si^{1} Ciu^{4}

Scholarism was a Hong Kong pro-democracy student activist group active in the fields of Hong Kong's education policy, political reform and youth policy. It was reported to have 200 members in May 2015.

The group was known for its stance on defending the autonomy of Hong Kong's education policy from Beijing's influence. It was also the leading organisation during the 2014 Hong Kong protests, better known as the "Umbrella Revolution".

Founded by a number of secondary school students on 29 May 2011, the group first came to media attention when they organised a protest against the Pro-Communist "moral and national education" put forward by the Hong Kong government in 2012. At the height of the event, 120,000 students and members of the public attended the demonstration and forced the government to retract its plans to introduce "moral and national education" as a compulsory subject in schools.

Scholarism ceased functioning in March 2016. Core members including Joshua Wong, Oscar Lai and Agnes Chow formed a new political party Demosisto in April.

== History ==
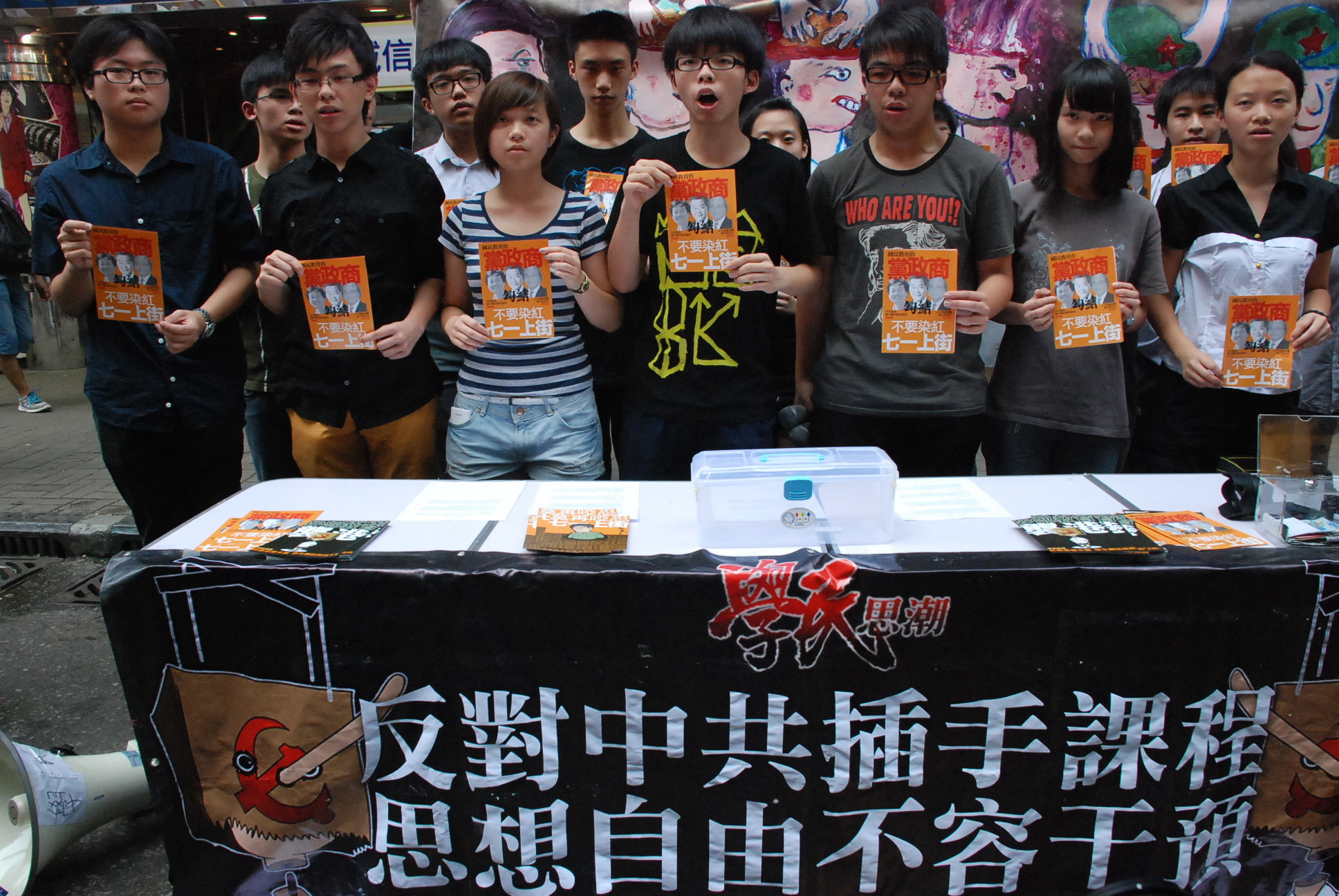
Students from Scholarism during an assembly against the National Education at the Hong Kong government headquarters in August 2012

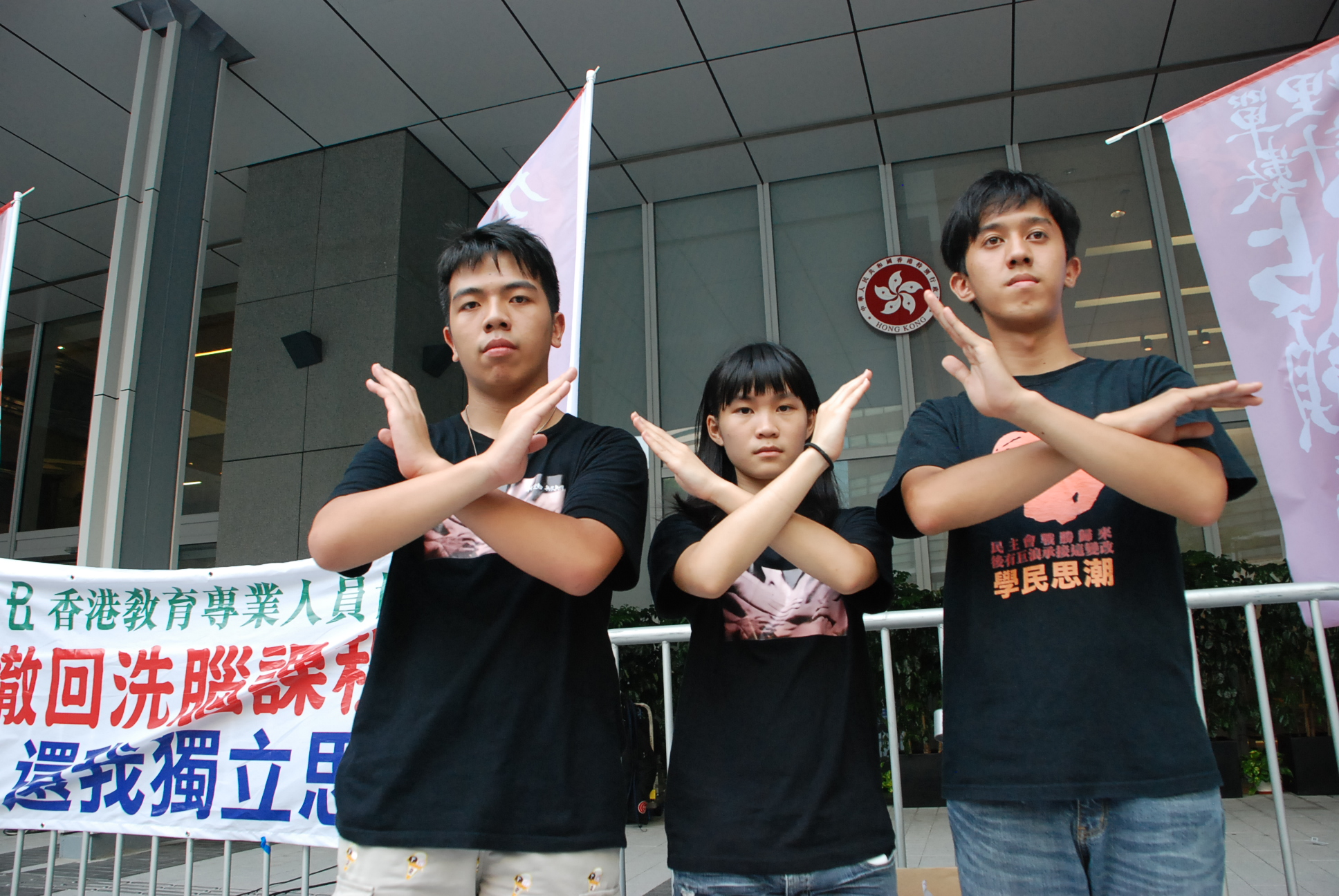
Students from Scholarism during the hunger strike against the National Education at the Hong Kong government headquarters in August 2012

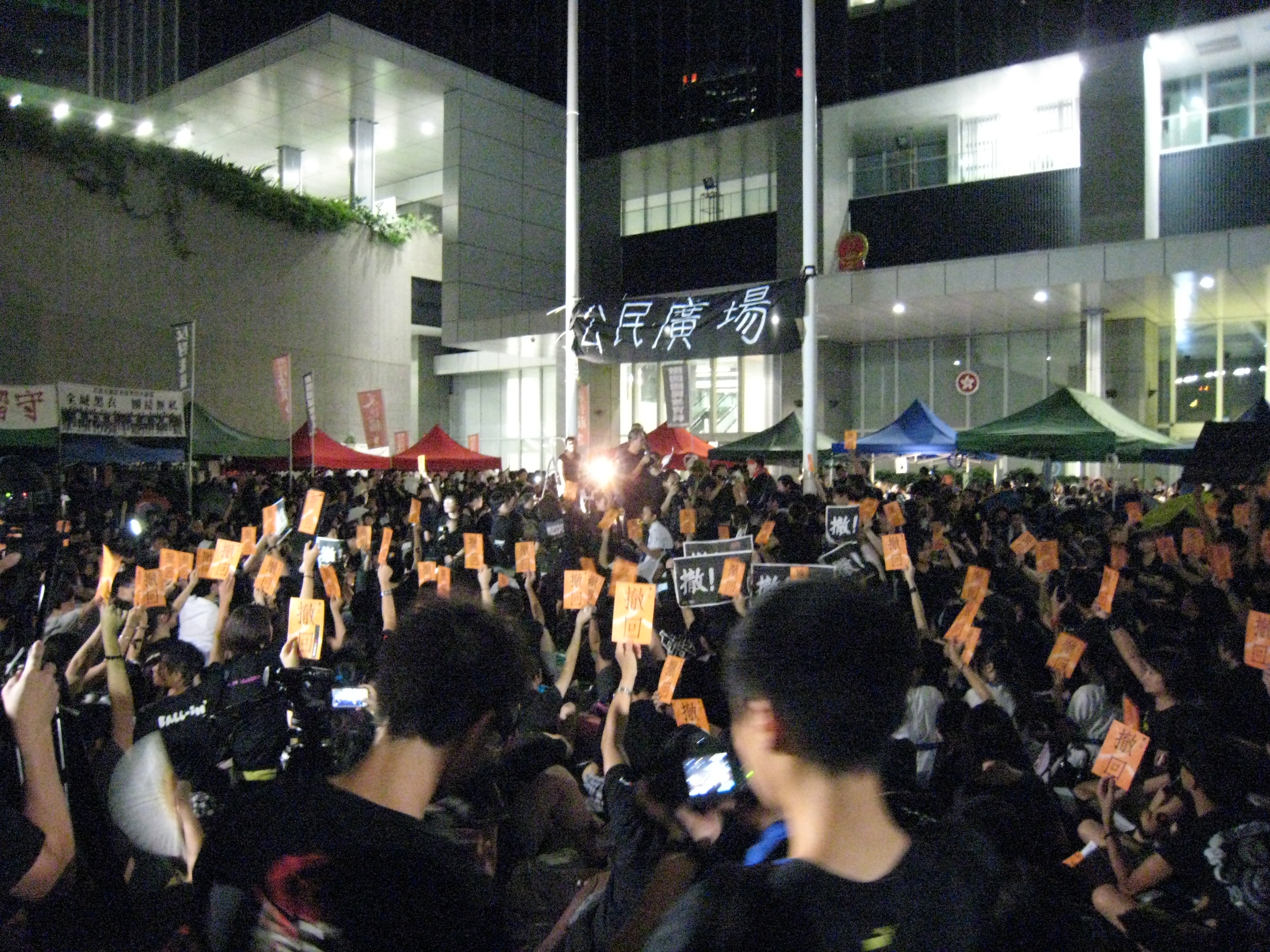
Scholarism in front of the government headquarters at Tamar in Hong Kong (7 September 2012)

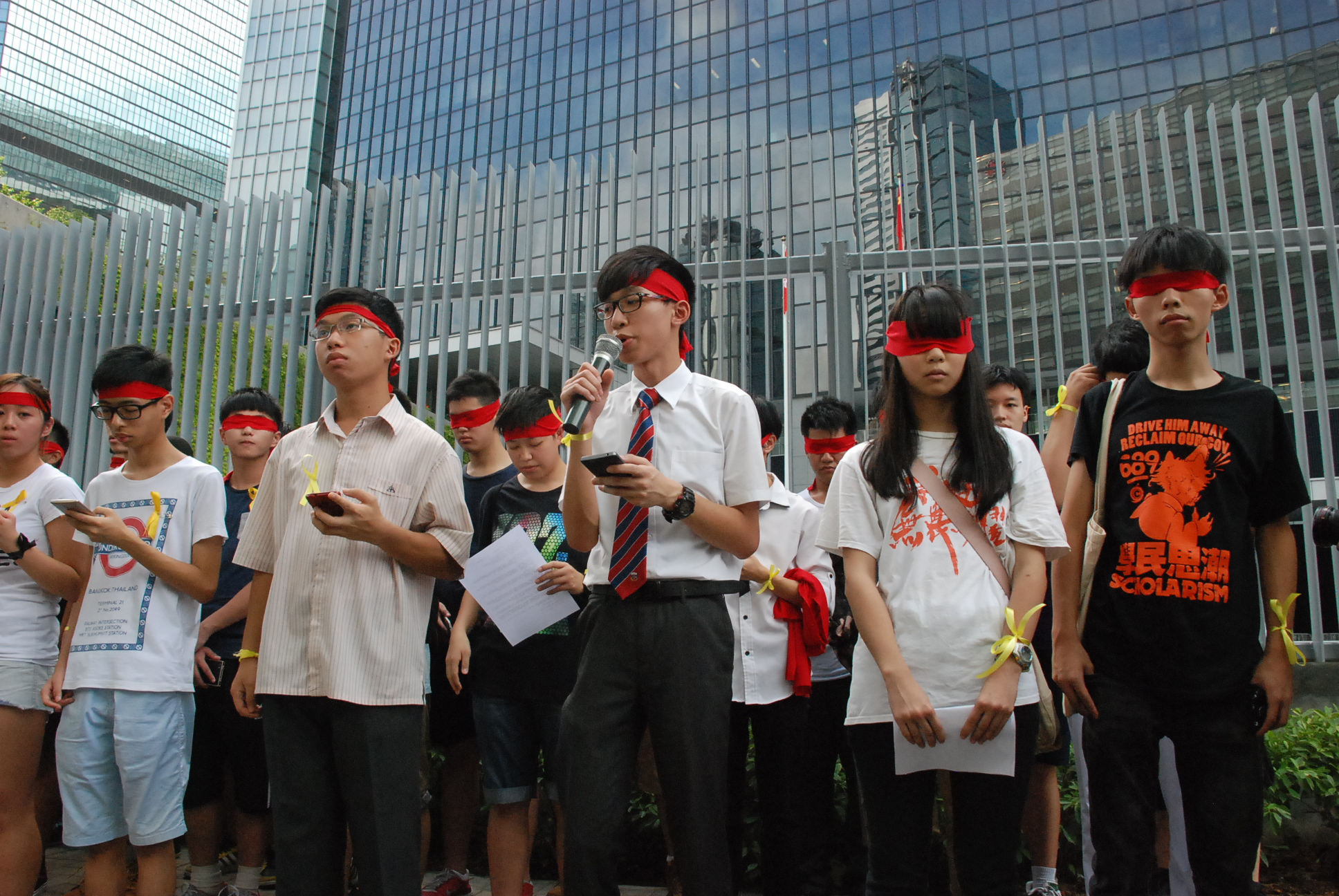
Scholarism at 2014 Hong Kong Class Boycott Campaign

=== Anti-Moral and National Education movement ===
Originally formed as "Scholarism – The Alliance Against Moral & National Education", Scholarism was the first student pressure group that protested against the "Moral and National Education" school curriculum put forward by the Hong Kong Government in 2012. The controversial subject ignored the 1989 Tiananmen Square protests and massacre and tried to present the Chinese Communist Party in favourable light. The group was one of the few organisations that took part in the protest outside the Hong Kong Liaison Office after the 1 July March 2012.

In August 2012, members of Scholarism launched an occupation protest at the Hong Kong government headquarters to force the government to retract its plans to introduce "Moral and National Education" as a compulsory subject. Fifty members occupied the public park beneath the government offices, and three of the protesters began a hunger strike. The protest lasted until September 2012.

=== Hong Kong democratic movement ===
After rising to prominence during the movement against the "Moral and National Education" the pro-democracy students remained active in the social and democracy movement in Hong Kong.

On 23 June 2013, Scholarism issued a statement which stressed the necessity of civil nomination for the 2017 Chief Executive election. By late August, Scholarism drew up a charter and began lobbying democratic Legislative Councillors to sign it, which would commit their parties to make civil nomination through universal suffrage the number one priority during the coming campaign for the 2017 Chief Executive election. The charter was signed by People Power, League of Social Democrats, Neo Democrats, and Neighbourhood and Worker's Service Centre. The Civic Party signed on with reservations, and the Democratic Party, Labour Party and Association for Democracy and People's Livelihood refused to sign it as they disagreed that public nomination should be the only way to put forward candidates.

=== Umbrella Revolution ===
In September 2014, Scholarism launched a class boycott with the Hong Kong Federation of Students (HKFS), protesting against the National People's Congress Standing Committee's (NPCSC) decision on the restricting nomination procedure of the election of the Chief Executive of Hong Kong.

On 26 September, the class boycott was held on Tim Mei Avenue and the square outside the Legislative Council Complex, as an organisation applied to hold a celebration event of 65th anniversary of the People's Republic China at the Tamar Park. It was also the day on which Scholarism hosted the class boycott movement for secondary school students. Joshua Wong, leading activist of Scholarism, pronounced the boycott statement. At 10:30 p.m. when the assembly came to the end, Joshua Wong, all of a sudden, called for the crowd to "retake" the Civic Square, around which fences were built two months earlier. Led by members of HKFS, hundred of protesters climbed across fences and tore down the barriers around the flag stage. The police surrounded hundreds of protesters, and then further mobilised towards the Civic Square and clashed with the protesters. The police pepper-sprayed them and displayed their batons. In chaos, it was reported a protester was having a heart attack. The police force originally refused to let the medics enter, and later permitted under the protesters pressure. At 10:52 p.m. police handcuffed and arrested Joshua Wong for forcible entry to government premises, disorderly conduct in public place and unlawful assembly. As visible wounds were found, he was sent to Ruttonjee Hospital for medical inspections before sent to the Central Police station. Many people on site were sent to the hospital because of injuries or feeling unwell. The police and protesters fell into stalemate later on.

The raid on the Civic Square triggered the massive occupy protest in the following days, as more protesters were called in support of the students being carried away from the Civic Square. At the night of 27 September, HKFS and Scholarism organised another assembly. Having declared the assembly unlawful, police blockaded Exit A of Admiralty MTR station and bridges outside the Central Office Complex until the size of the crowd caused the police to lift the blockade. At 1:30 am, 28 September, Benny Tai, co-initiator of the Occupy Central with Love and Peace movement, declared the official launch of the "Occupy Central" campaign. In the afternoon, as more and more people flooded to Admiralty in support of the students, the police completely blockaded the access to the government headquarters. Later, the protesters began to occupy Harcourt Road which police responded by using tear gas, triggering widespread occupations at Admiralty, Mong Kok and Causeway Bay.

Although the protests were fruitless in the end, Scholarism remained its leading role in the following 79-day occupy movement.

=== Dissolution ===
In February 2016, Oscar Lai Man-lok, a core member of Scholarism, revealed that he, Joshua Wong and Agnes Chow Ting planned to form a political party and field at least two candidates to run in the Legislative Council elections in September. Lai subsequently quit Scholarism to support Civic Party's Alvin Yeung Ngok-kiu in the Legislative Council by-election for New Territories East, as Scholarism refused to officially endorse a candidate between the pro-democratic Civic Party and the localist camp Hong Kong Indigenous's Edward Leung Tin-kei in the election.

In March, an online news outlet IBHK reported that the group, would be disbanded. Scholarism's Facebook page said on 16 March that it was at present working on its future direction and would announce if it reached any decisions. Scholarism officially ceased functioning on 20 March 2016. The group had a sum of HK$1,450,000 in its bank account, of which HK$700,000 was transferred to a new student activist group and the other HK$750,000 was transferred to a legal assistance fund to assist the lawsuits. Core members including Joshua Wong, Oscar Lai and Agnes Chow went on to form Demosisto.

On 22 August 2025, the Hong Kong government gazetted notices to strike off close to 300 groups from the societies registry, unless they could provide proof of their existence within three months. Scholarism was among the groups.

== See also ==
- Lessons in Dissent, a documentary film
- Joshua: Teenager vs. Superpower, a documentary film about Joshua Wong and Scholarism.
