= 2017 imprisonment of Hong Kong democracy activists =

Arrest of Hong Kong pro-democracy activists

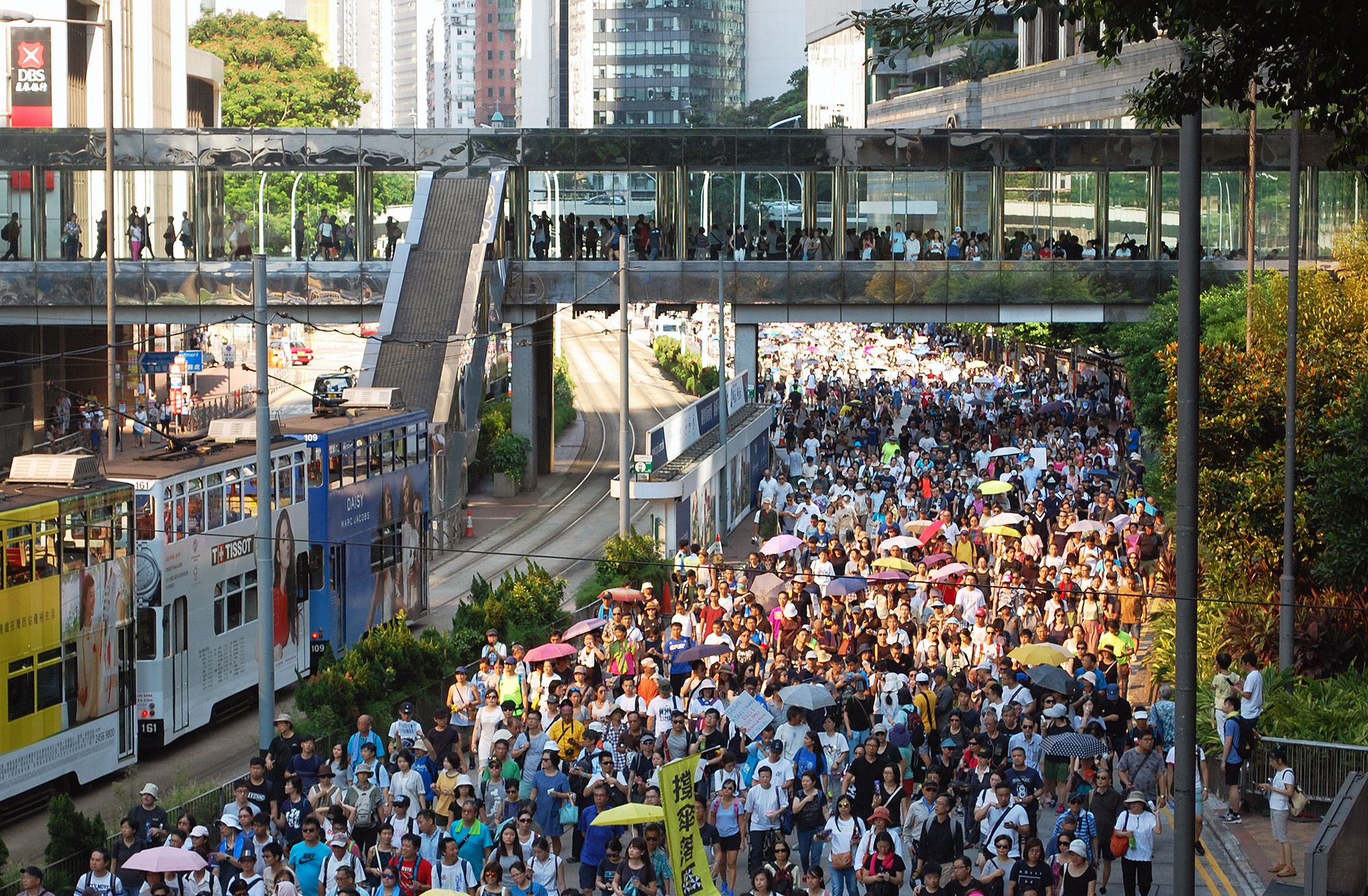
- Supporters of the jailed activists marching on 20 August 2017
- Date: 17 August 2017
- Location: Hong Kong
- Type: Imprisonment
- Cause: 3 on roles in storming the Civic Square, 13 on roles against the planned North East New Territories new town
- Participants: Joshua Wong, Nathan Law and Alex Chow
- Outcome: Applauded by the pro-Beijing camp but decried by pro-democracy figures in Hong Kong
- Convicted: 16
- Verdict: Guilty
- Convictions: Chow: Taking part in an unlawful assembly Law: Inciting others to take part in an unlawful assembly Wong: Taking part in an unlawful assembly
- Sentence: 6 (Wong), 7 (Chow), 8 (Law) months in prison and 8 (1 person), 13 (12 people) months in prison

On 17 August 2017, three Hong Kong pro-democracy activists, Alex Chow, Nathan Law and Joshua Wong, were given prison sentences by the Court of Appeal for their roles in a protest at the Civic Square in front of the Central Government Complex in Tamar, Admiralty, on 26 and 27 September 2014. The events at the Civic Square helped set off massive pro-democracy protests, sometimes referred to as the Umbrella Movement, which lasted until police cleared the last of the protest sites in December 2014.

The three had originally been convicted and ordered to perform community service or, in the case of Chow, given a suspended sentence. The government appealed their sentences and successfully pursued harsher punishments on the grounds that their crime involved a large-scale unlawful assembly with a high risk of violence. The trio's imprisonment was applauded by the pro-Beijing camp but decried by pro-democracy figures in Hong Kong as well as international politicians and human rights advocates, who have called the activists Hong Kong's first prisoners of conscience, and alleged that the sentence is intended to intimidate other would-be activists.

The sentence also disqualifies the three from running for office for five years, quashing their political aspirations in the near future. Wong had previously sought election but was barred due to his age, while Law, democratically elected to the Legislative Council in September 2016, was removed from office in July 2017 following a government challenge.

The three activists were released on 6 February 2018 after a successful appeal against their custodial sentences at the Court of Final Appeal. In its judgment, the Court affirmed the guiding principles of the lower courts but held that it was inappropriate to retroactively apply the new sentencing guidelines to the activists.

== Background ==
=== Activists ===
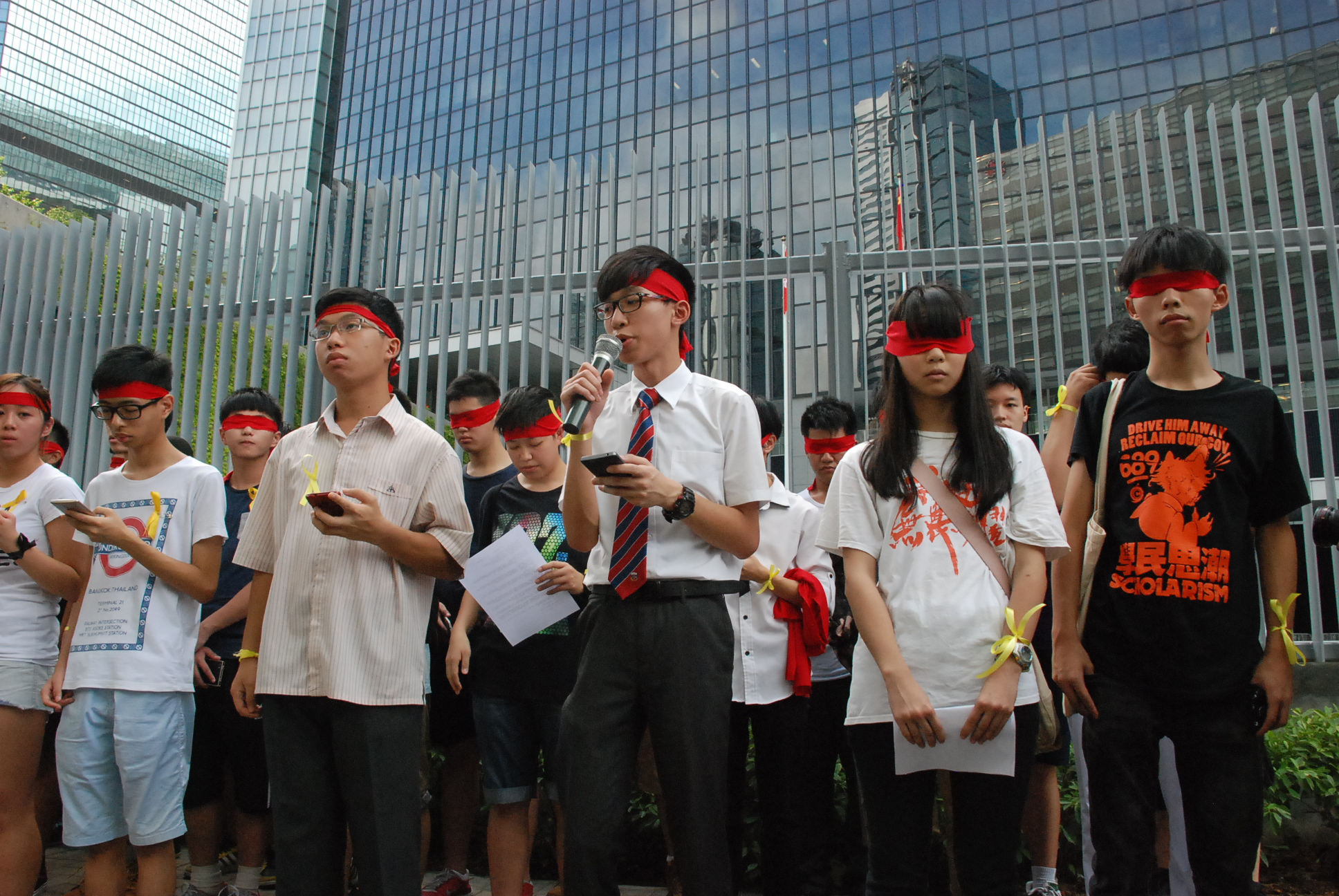
Wong (far right) and other student activists protesting in front of the Civic Square on 23 September 2014

Wong, Law, and Chow have been prominent democracy activists for several years. Joshua Wong, now a student at the Open University of Hong Kong, co-founded Scholarism in 2011. Scholarism gained prominence as one of several civil society organisations that protested against the "Moral and National Education" curriculum, proposed by the Education Bureau. He subsequently participated in the Umbrella Movement and then co-founded a political party, Demosistō, in 2016.

Nathan Law is an undergraduate student at Lingnan University as well as the incumbent chairman of Demosistō. He previously occupied various leadership positions in the Lingnan University Students' Union and served as Secretary General of the Hong Kong Federation of Students. During the 2016 Legislative Council election Law ran under the Demosistō banner in the Hong Kong Island geographical constituency and was elected, becoming the youngest-ever elected legislator in Hong Kong. On 14 July 2017, Law became one of six pro-democracy legislators removed from office due to legal action by the Hong Kong Government regarding their manners during the oath-taking ceremony.

Alex Chow is a University of Hong Kong student, a former vice-president of the Hong Kong University Students' Union, and a former secretary-general of the Hong Kong Federation of Students. He was one of the early organisers of the Umbrella Movement.

=== Political context ===
The Chief Executive is the head of the Government of Hong Kong. Article 45 of Hong Kong's constitution, the Basic Law, stipulates that the "ultimate aim is the selection of the Chief Executive by universal suffrage upon nomination by a broadly representative nominating committee in accordance with democratic procedures". Following the transfer of Hong Kong to China in 1997, the pro-democratic camp pushed for the election of the chief executive in 2007 through universal suffrage. On 26 April 2004, the Standing Committee of the National People's Congress (NPCSC), a mainland Chinese legislative body, ruled out the possibility that universal suffrage would be allowed in 2007. In 2007, the NPCSC ruled out the 2012 election of the legislature and chief executive through universal suffrage, but stated that the Legislative Council and the chief executive could be elected through universal suffrage in 2016 and 2017, respectively.

However, democratic aspirations stalled on 31 August 2014, when the Standing Committee of the National People's Congress in Beijing made a decision that chief executive candidates in 2017 would be required to "love the country and love Hong Kong"; that all candidates would be screened by a nominating committee of a composition paralleling the existing Election Committee, which is dominated by pro-Beijing interests; and that any chief executive elected through these means would then have to be appointed by the Chinese government. The decision was intensely decried by the pan-democratic camp, who said the arrangement would not amount to genuine democracy.

=== 2014 Civic Square protests ===
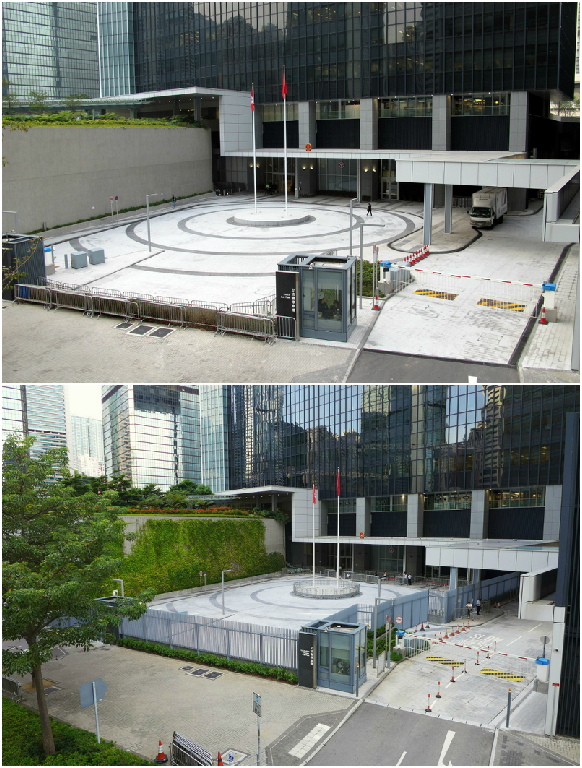
The Civic Square, pictured in 2012 and 2014

The incident which led to the sentencing took place in the forecourt of the East Wing of the Central Government Complex, known more commonly as the Civic Square. The new government headquarters was opened in 2011, and was designed under the concept of "Door Always Open" by architect Rocco Yim to symbolise the pride that Hong Kongers take in "openness and transparency of governance". In keeping with this design concept, the Civic Square was originally open to the public when the new government headquarters was inaugurated in 2011.

The square became a popular site for political demonstrations. In mid-2014, several protests were held there against plans for the development of new towns in the northeastern New Territories. In response, around 16 July 2014 work began on a permanent three-metre high metal fence, closing off the Civic Square from Tim Mei Avenue. The Hong Kong government stated that the barrier was a necessary security measure while others stated that the move ran contrary to Hong Kong people's right to freedom of assembly, which is codified in the Basic Law. The government responded that protests would be allowed in the square on public holidays if the director of the Administration Wing consented in advance. Other areas of the complex were fortified at the same time as the Civic Square.

Concurrently with the fortification of the square, the government's controversial democratic reform proposals, coupled with the 831 decision, were triggering discontent and protests. On 22 September 2014, students launched a week-long class boycott campaign, coupled with demonstrations at the government complex. At around 22:30 on 26 September 2014, protesting students scaled the fence that had been erected in July in an attempt to "retake" the Civic Square. Police managed to regain control of the square, and kettled dozens of protesters on the circular base of the flagpoles, where they were denied access to water and the toilet. At the same time, a large number of protesters amassed outside the Civic Square. The square was cleared by police by the end of the following day, with more than 60 people arrested. Wong, Chow, and Law were among those arrested. Four police officers were injured, one of them suffered a deep wound by an umbrella, and eleven security staff at the government complex were also injured.

The incident immediately helped kick off the 2014 Hong Kong protests, also known as the Umbrella Movement, which saw the motorway in front of the government complex, Harcourt Road, occupied by protesters until 11 December 2014.

== Legal action ==
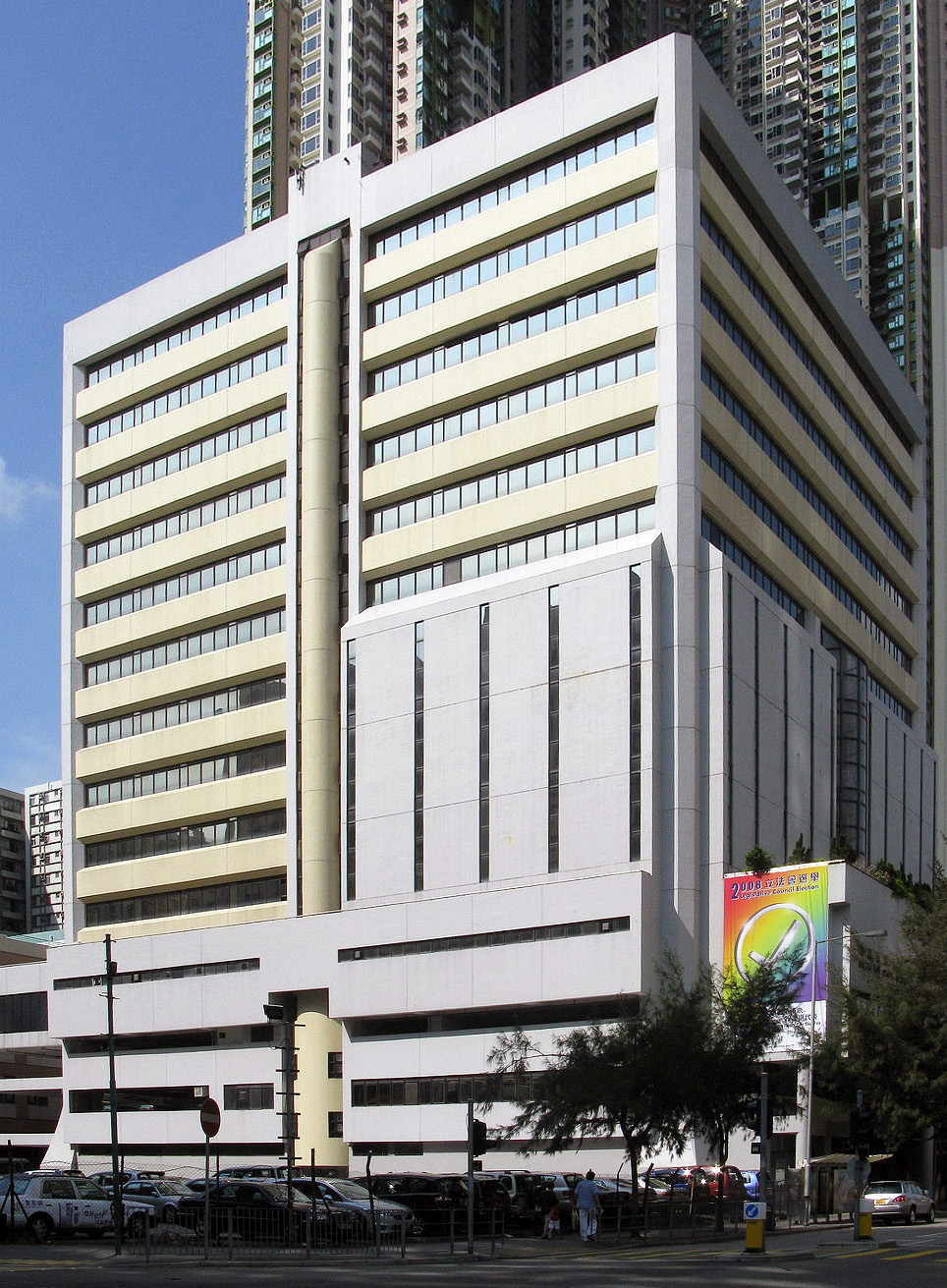
Eastern Magistrates' Court, where the trio initially received noncustodial sentences in August 2016

=== Initial sentencing ===
On 21 July 2016, the Eastern Magistrates' Court found Wong and Chow guilty of taking part in an unlawful assembly, while Law was found guilty of inciting others to take part in an unlawful assembly. These were the first criminal convictions for all three. Wong was cleared of a charge of inciting others to take part in an unlawful assembly.

On 15 August 2016, the three were sentenced. Wong was ordered to perform 80 hours of community service, while Law was sentenced to 120 hours. Chow was sentenced to three weeks in prison with a one-year suspension to allow him to continue his education at the London School of Economics as planned.

Immediately following the sentencing, Law said that they respected the decision of the court, and alleged that the Public Order Ordinance was "suppressing [their] freedoms to assemble and protest".

The trio subsequently served these initial sentences.

=== Appeal and additional sentence ===
The Department of Justice disagreed with the sentencing. In September 2016 it requested a review of the sentences, arguing that the community service sentence was "clearly not enough" as the three "[did] not feel true remorse".

A review hearing was held on 21 September 2016, where the magistrate stated that the original sentencing and reasoning was sufficient, and that the department had "failed to provide sufficient evidence for the necessity of a tougher sentence". The department had compared the activists to gangsters, which the presiding magistrate, June Cheung, said was unfair as they were expressing their political beliefs. She stated that there were precedents for non-custodial sentences in similar cases, and dismissed the bid to impose harsher sentences on the three.

In October 2016, the Court of Appeal agreed to hear a government appeal against the original sentence.

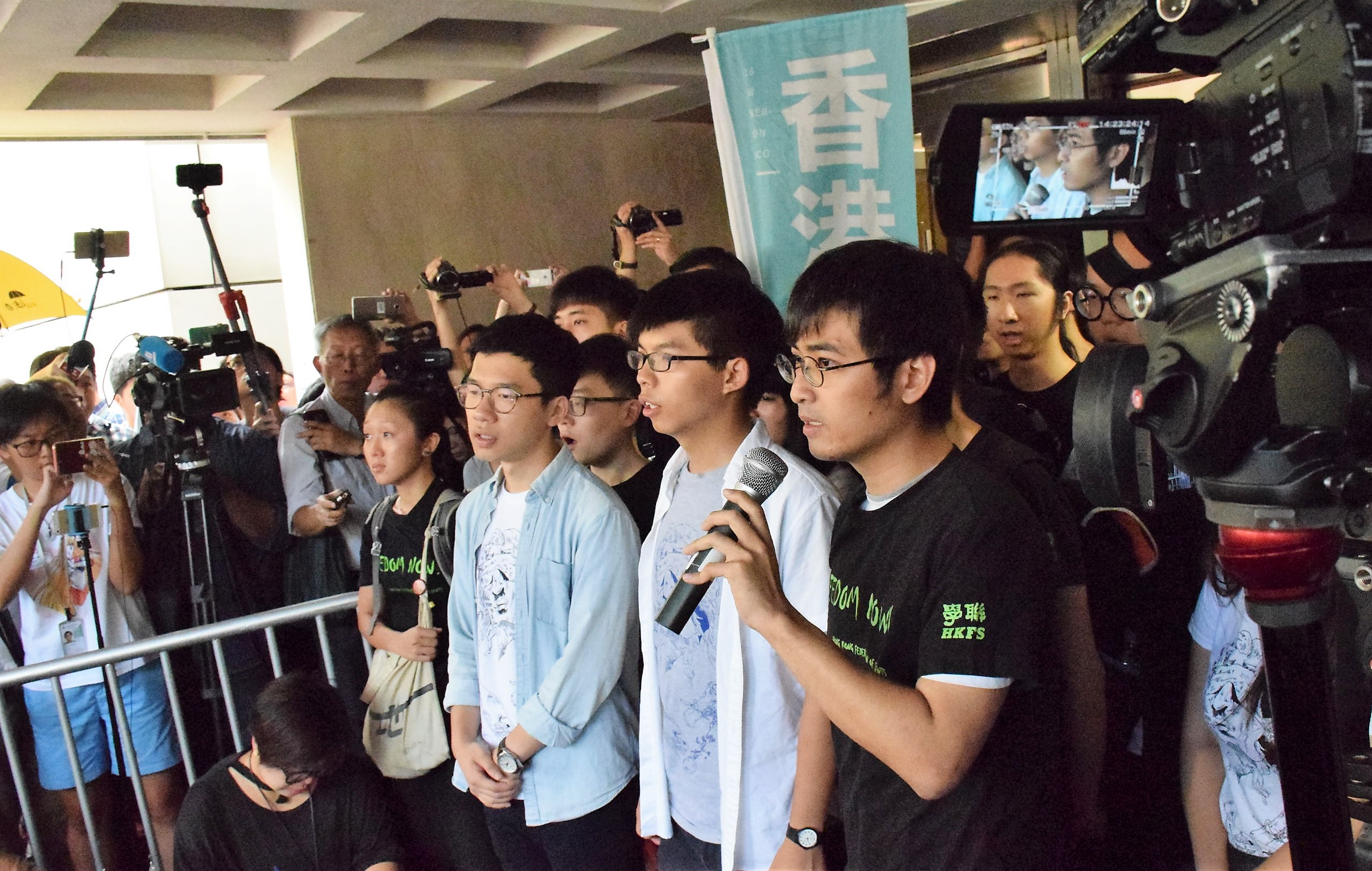
Law, Wong, and Chow speaking to media and supporters before entering court on 17 August 2017

On 17 August 2017, the Court of Appeal upheld the convictions of all three and enhanced their sentences by imposing six and seven-month prison terms on Wong and Chow, respectively, and sentencing Law to eight months in jail, removing the suspension. The judges found that the case involved a large-scale unlawful assembly with a high risk of violence, and the crimes were serious, calling for deterrent custodial sentences.

The sentencing prevented the activists from running for public office in the next five years. Law was previously an elected legislator, while Wong had expressed a desire to seek election in the future, having been unable to run in the 2016 LegCo election for not meeting the minimum age qualification.

== Imprisonment ==
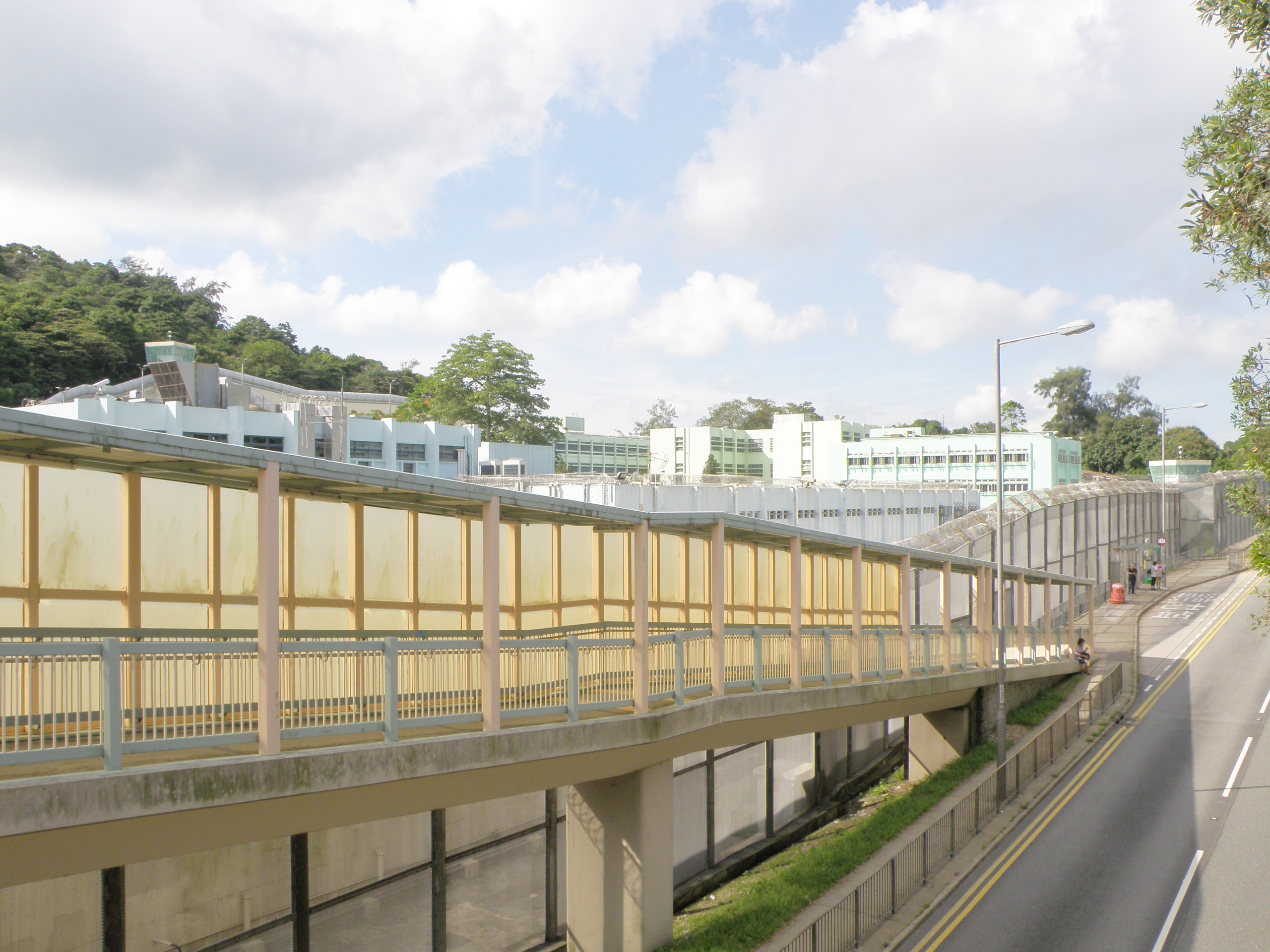
Pik Uk Correctional Institution, a maximum security youth prison where Wong is held

Wong was sent to Pik Uk Correctional Institution, a maximum security facility for male prisoners below the age of 21.

Law and Chow were being held at Lai Chi Kok Reception Centre pending their transfer to prison. On 22 August 2017, Law was moved to the medium-security Tong Fuk Correctional Institution on Ma Po Ping Road on Lantau Island, while Chow was moved to the low-security Pik Uk Prison on Clear Water Bay Road, near Sai Kung, to serve their sentences.

== Reactions ==
=== Domestic ===
The sentence received mixed reactions in Hong Kong. Political figures from the pro-democratic camp and civil rights activists criticised the sentence for being disproportionately long, the Secretary for Justice for appealing the sentence, and the sitting judges for not considering the act committed by Wong, Law and Chow as civil disobedience that would result in a mitigated sentence. On the contrary, pro-establishment politicians welcomed the sentence. The legal profession has also responded to allegations by the media that the Hong Kong judiciary had been influenced or controlled by the Chinese Communist Party through the Hong Kong Bar Association and the Law Society of Hong Kong, stating that there is no indication of such influence.

Upon the sentencing, Joshua Wong wrote in a series of tweets that the sentence will not halt the activism for universal suffrage and democracy, or "win the hearts and minds of Hong Kongers". Other pro-democracy figures in Hong Kong also criticised the court decision. Academic Benny Tai at The University of Hong Kong, who also faces prosecution for his role in the 2014 protests, stated that civil disobedience to "challenge the law or acts of injustice by the government" is a necessary part of a civilised society.

There was also criticism against sentence appeal made by the Secretary of Justice. Lawyer Wilson Leung expressed on behalf of the Progressive Lawyers Group that "we strongly disagree with the government treating political problems as ‘law and order’ problems and focusing on the prosecution of protestors." Former chairman of the Hong Kong Bar Association and Civic Party politician Alan Leong commented that the appeal was "certainly politically motivated". Another former Bar Association chairman Paul Shieh noted however that there is insufficient evidence suggesting that political considerations were involved. Shieh also called on the Secretary for Justice Rimsky Yuen to explain the reasons behind the appeal so as to increase the transparency of the decision to appeal.

The League of Social Democrats held a rally against the decision outside the Lai Chi Kok Reception Centre on the evening of 18 August 2017. Several different organisations held a public protest march on 20 August 2017, which started at the Southorn Playground and ended with a rally at the Court of Final Appeal Building. Protesters focused their criticism on Secretary for Justice Rimsky Yuen, following reports that he ignored the advice of top prosecutors in pursuing the appeal.

On the other hand, members of the pro-Beijing camp applauded the prison sentences. Starry Lee, chairwoman of Hong Kong's largest pro-Beijing political party, the Democratic Alliance for the Betterment and Progress of Hong Kong (DAB), said that the three "paid the price" for disobeying the law. DAB vice-chairman Holden Chow called unlawful assembly a "serious crime" and said that a heavy punishment was necessary to deter others. Pro-Beijing activist Robert Chow asked rhetorically: "who worked behind the scenes to poison and brainwash Wong, Law, and Chow, along with thousands of young people, to make them delight in seeing the country and Hong Kong as enemies, in having made Hongkongers suffer for the last three years?"

=== Mainland China ===
An editorial in the Chinese state newspaper Global Times stated, "This sentence will be a milestone in Hong Kong's governance. From now on people who protest violently can be given a guilty sentence following this precedent, and they will need to go to jail".

Hua Chunying, spokeswoman for China's Ministry of Foreign Affairs, stated:

No one shall engage in illegal and violent activities under the pretext of "democracy" or "freedom". The court of the Hong Kong Special Administration Region made the judgment of the relevant case on the basis of facts and in accordance with Hong Kong's law. I would like to reaffirm that Hong Kong is a Special Administration Region of China and Hong Kong's affairs belong to China's internal affairs. The Chinese side firmly opposes any external forces' interference in the affairs and judicial independence of the Hong Kong Special Administration Region.

=== International ===
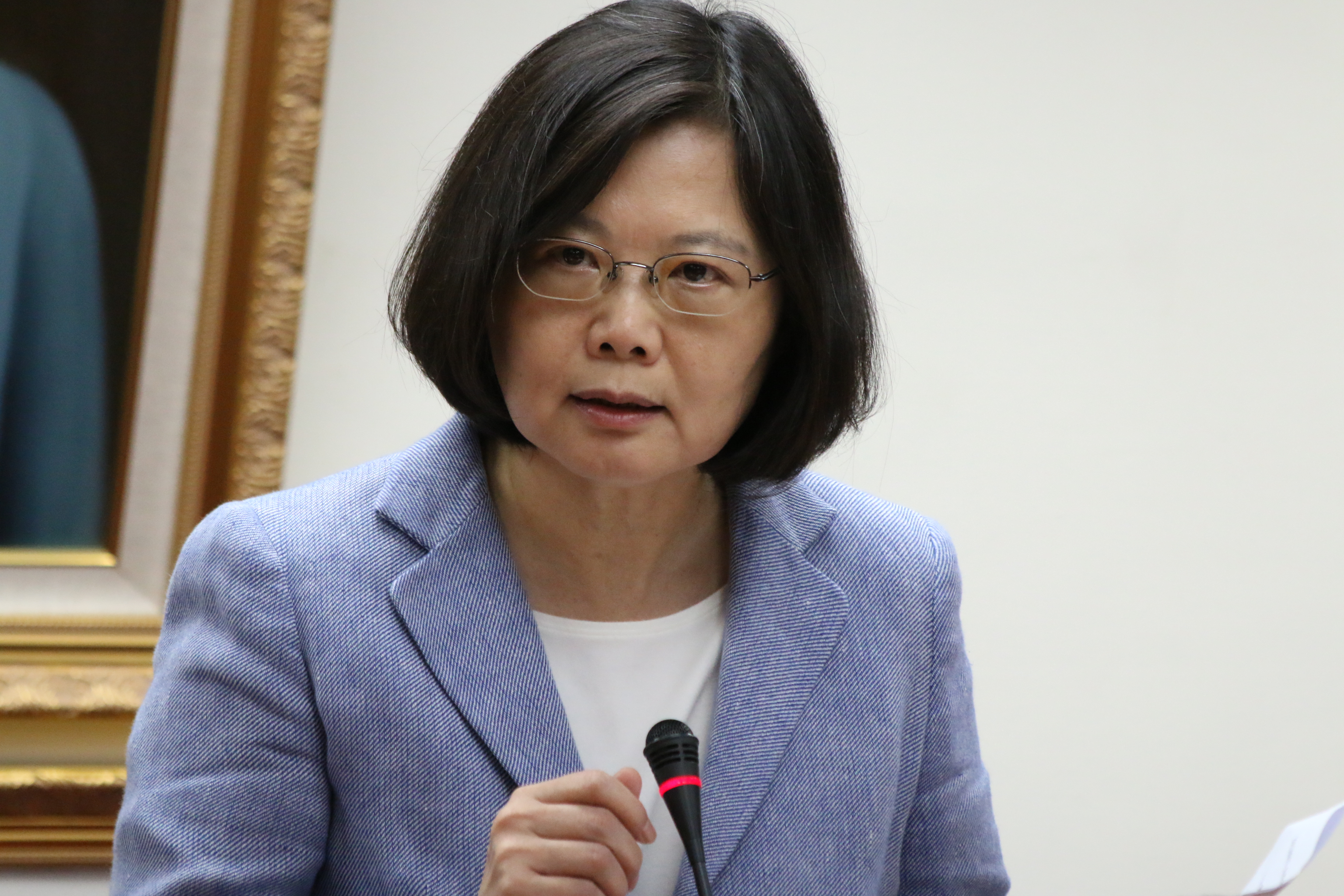
Taiwanese president Tsai Ing-wen, whose office released a statement expressing Taiwan's "deep regret" over the jail sentences

The Taiwanese government expressed its "deep regret" over the jail sentences, and reiterated Taiwan's "long-standing stance to support Hong Kong people to pursue democracy, freedom, the rule of law and human rights". The Democratic Progressive Party stated that "graver suppression will only spark more resistance", while a government spokesman stated that "Hong Kong authorities should take seriously the fact that Hong Kong people want to be able to choose their own way of life and political regime."

Nancy Pelosi, leader of the United States Democratic Party in the U.S. House of Representatives, called the ruling an injustice that should "shock the conscience of the world". She described the prison sentence as an "egregious decision", and that the resulting disqualification of Wong, Law and Chow to run for public office was unjust. She also regarded the sentence to be against "the basic notions of freedom and democracy".

A group of 25 international figures released a joint statement describing the imprisonment as "outrageously unjust". The signatories called the Umbrella Movement "one of the most peaceful and restrained movements of public protest the world has ever seen" and wrote that the sentencing amounted to "an outrageous miscarriage of justice, a death knell for Hong Kong’s rule of law and basic human rights, and a severe blow to the principles of 'One Country, Two Systems'". The statement was signed by eminent politicians, human rights activists, and ex-political prisoners including David Alton, Paddy Ashdown, Sonja Biserko, Charles Maung Bo, Fiona Bruce, John Dayal, Andrew Khoo, David Kilgour, John McCarthy, Mohamed Nasheed, Geoffrey Nice, Consiglio Di Nino, Grover J. Rees III, Malcolm Rifkind, Janelle Saffin, Charles Santiago, Chris Smith, Charles Tannock, Alissa Wahid, and Zarganar. The group also questioned whether punishing the activists twice (as Wong, Law, and Chow had already served their initial community service orders) contraveneds provisions against double jeopardy in the International Covenant on Civil and Political Rights.

In September 2017, Hong Kong slipped five places in the judicial independence category of the latest global competitiveness ranking compiled by the Geneva-based non-profit organisation World Economic Forum.

=== Academics ===
Eric Cheung, a faculty member at the University of Hong Kong Faculty of Law, questioned why the Court of Appeal decision described the defendants' actions as "seriously violent" while earlier the Eastern Magistracy had cleared the trio of committing any acts of violence. He stated that there did not seem to be any evidence presented that the three committed violence, and questioned whether the Court of Appeal had effected a "substantial and grave injustice". He said there were grounds for the three to appeal the ruling to the Court of Final Appeal, Hong Kong's court of last resort.

=== Human rights organisations ===
Various human rights organisations also spoke against the sentencing. A spokesperson for Human Rights Watch stated that the effort to put the trio in jail was "not about public order, but is instead a craven political move to keep the trio out of the Legislative Council, as well as deter future protests." Similarly, Mabel Au, a spokeswoman for Amnesty International Hong Kong, commented, "the relentless and vindictive pursuit of student leaders using vague charges smacks of political payback by the authorities."

Maya Wang, a researcher with Human Rights Watch, stated: "This is a watershed moment for Hong Kong. It now has political prisoners ... For anyone thinking of protesting, the prospect of a harsh jail sentence will now loom over them."

== Other jailings ==
This article focuses on the three most well-known activists to be jailed in 2017. The high-profile imprisonment of Wong, Law, and Chow spurred some Hong Kong media outlets to compile lists of all individuals who have been imprisoned for allegedly political reasons. On 15 August 2017, 13 protesters who stormed the Legislative Council building in June 2014 (during a protest against the planned North East New Territories new towns) were handed prison sentences of eight to 13 months after a similar push by the Department of Justice for more severe sentences than the community service orders originally imposed.

== See also ==
- Tsang Tak-sing – a Form Six student jailed for two years in 1967 for distributing leaflets condemning the colonial education system and promoting public-order crime
- Hong Kong Watch – a Hong Kong human rights-monitoring organization founded by Benedict Rogers who was denied entry to Hong Kong in 2017
- Jimmy Lai – A Hong Kong businessman arrested in 2021 in relation to the Hong Kong national security law passed in 2020
