= Hong Kong Watch =

Human rights organisation monitoring freedom in Hong Kong

- Formation: 11 December 2017; 8 years ago
- Founded at: United Kingdom
- Purpose: Monitor and report developments in Hong Kong
- Official language: English
- Co-founders: Benedict Rogers; Johnny Patterson; Aileen Calverley; Gray Sergeant
- Patrons: Sir Malcolm Rifkind; Catherine West; Lord Paddy Ashdown; Lord David Alton; Sir Geoffrey Nice; Lord Chris Patten
- Website: www.hongkongwatch.org

Hong Kong Watch is a non-governmental organisation (NGO) based in the United Kingdom that was established to monitor the conditions of human rights, freedoms and rule of law in Hong Kong. It was founded by British human rights activist Benedict Rogers on 11 December 2017, two months after he was barred from entering Hong Kong.

== History ==
In the aftermath of the 2014 Hong Kong protests and Legislative Council oath-taking controversy, Benedict Rogers, a British human rights activist, intended to visit a group of imprisoned Hong Kong democracy activists. On 11 October 2017, Rogers was barred entry to Hong Kong. He arrived at Hong Kong International Airport on a flight from Bangkok but was escorted away by immigration officials and placed on a flight back to Thailand. He had previously been warned by a contact in the Chinese embassy in London that he might be refused entry to Hong Kong. Rogers, who lived in Hong Kong between 1997 and 2002, has criticised what Rogers says is Mainland China's increasing threat to democracy in Hong Kong and has campaigned against the imprisonment of pro-democracy activists Joshua Wong, Nathan Law, Alex Chow and Jimmy Lai. British Foreign Secretary Boris Johnson demanded an explanation from the Hong Kong authorities and the Central Chinese government. Hua Chunying, a spokeswoman for the Chinese Foreign Ministry, later responded that the move was within China's sovereignty and said: "Whether this person's trip to Hong Kong involved an intention to intervene in Hong Kong's internal affairs and judicial independence – he knows very well himself."

The following day, Rogers announced he would form a non-governmental organisation (NGO) to monitor the rule of law and human rights in Hong Kong. Hong Kong Watch was launched at a reception hosted in Speaker's House, House of Commons in the Parliament of the United Kingdom on 11 December 2017. The organisation appointed Johnny Patterson as its founding Director, with Rogers acting as Chair of Trustees It was established on grounds of the belief of the fact that under the Sino-British Joint Declaration, the United Kingdom has a moral and legal obligation to speak out.

=== IPAC ===
In the summer of 2020, the leadership of Hong Kong Watch worked with human rights leaders such as Luke de Pulford to create the Inter-Parliamentary Alliance on China, a global pressure group, advocating for human rights in China, particularly with regards the persecution of Uyghurs in China and Democracy in Hong Kong.

=== New appointments in 2020 ===
Benedict Rogers joined the staff team of the organisation in September 2020 as chief executive officer, with Patterson moving to Policy Director. The organisation also brought in veteran Labour party staffer Sam Goodman as senior policy advisor and Hong Kong activist in exile, Joey Siu, as an Associate based in Washington DC.

=== Blockage in Hong Kong ===
On 14 February 2022, it was reported that the site had been blocked by Internet service providers in Hong Kong, including PCCW, CMHK, HKBN, Netvigator, etc. Hong Kong Watch posted on Twitter that they believed the action was enforced upon order from the police.

== Mission ==
Hong Kong Watch was set up to provide independent, comprehensive analysis and thought leadership on freedom and human rights in Hong Kong.

== Protest action at Acropolis of Athens ==
Three activists, including Hong Kong Watch Associate Joey Siu and Tibetan student Tsela Zoksang, were arrested at the Acropolis of Athens on 17 October 2021, the day before the lighting of the Olympic Torch. Siu and Tsela Zoksang first attempted to unfurl a banner to protest the 2022 Winter Olympics in Beijing; after the banner was taken away, they draped the Tibetan flag and the Hong Kong Revolution flag over scaffolding at the site and chanted slogans before they were arrested and charged for violating laws on protection of archeological sites. Siu and Tsela Zoksang were released the following day and allowed to leave Greece, but ordered to return in January 2022 to appear in court.

== See also ==
- Politics of Hong Kong
