= Lester Shum =

Hong Kong activist and politician (born 1993)

- 岑敖暉
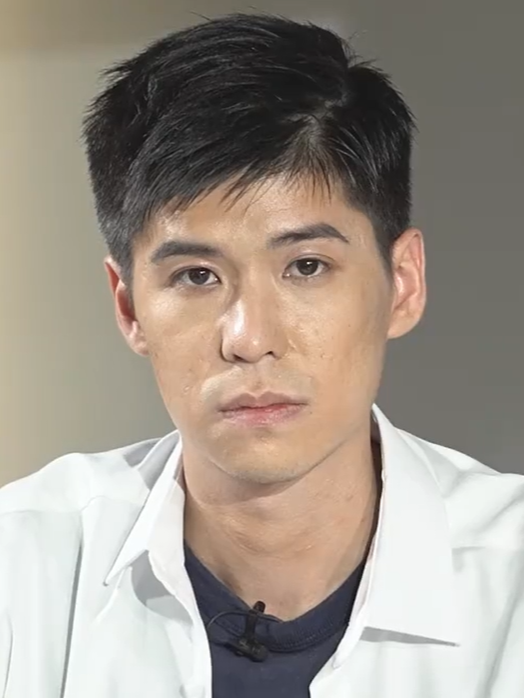
- Lester Shum in 2020

Member of the Tsuen Wan District Council
- In office 1 January 2020 – 21 May 2021
- Preceded by: Timmy Chow Ping-tim
- Succeeded by: Vacant
- Constituency: Hoi Bun

57th Deputy Secretary General of Hong Kong Federation of Students
- In office 1 April 2014 – 31 March 2015
- Secretary General: Alex Chow
- Preceded by: Willis Ho; Johnson Yeung
- Succeeded by: Wong Ka-fai

Personal details
- Born: 11 June 1993 (age 33) New York City, U.S.
- Citizenship: Hong Kong
- Party: Team Chu Hoi-dick of New Territories West
- Spouse: Nicole Alexis Yu (m. 2021)
- Education: Chinese University of Hong Kong

Lester Shum
- Traditional Chinese: 岑敖暉
- Simplified Chinese: 岑敖晖
Transcriptions
Standard Mandarin
- Hanyu Pinyin: Cén Áohuī
Yue: Cantonese
- Jyutping: sam4 ngou4 fai1

Lester Shum Ngo-fai (Chinese: 岑敖暉; born 11 June 1993) is a Hong Kong social activist and politician. He was a leader of the 2014 pro-democracy protests in Hong Kong and served as deputy secretary-general of the Hong Kong Federation of Students (HKFS) from April 2014 to March 2015. He was a member of the Tsuen Wan District Council for Hoi Bun from 2020 to 2021.

== Early life ==
Shum was born in New York, United States. He came to Hong Kong as a toddler during the mid-1990s. He identified as a Hongkonger, expressing his emotional attachment to the city. Shum completed his secondary education at Sheng Kung Hui Tsang Shiu Tim Secondary School before enrolling in The Chinese University of Hong Kong (CUHK). He initially majored in Information engineering, but later switched to studying Government and Public Administration.

Shum grew up in a middle-class household. According to Shum, his political awakening came from the popular internet forum Hong Kong Golden Forum.

== Umbrella Movement ==
Shum was elected vice president of the Student Union at CUHK and held the position from 2013 to 2014. He then served as deputy secretary-general of the Hong Kong Federation of Students (HKFS), from April 2014 to March 2015. In his role, Shum and student leader Alex Chow galvanized the 2014 class boycott campaign against the decision of the National People's Congress Standing Committee (NPCSC), which set the framework of the restrictive electoral method in the 2017 Chief Executive election.

In September 2014, the student movement led to the massive Occupy protests, where Shum was joined by thousands of pro-democracy activists to oppose Beijing's tightening control over Hong Kong. Over the next few weeks, he continued participating in a series of highly publicized sit-in demonstrations, which had been described as the Umbrella Movement. Shum explained, "We believe that the occupation is our biggest bargaining chip, and for now it is able to apply the most pressure against the government."

Shum was critical of how the government had handled the protests. After the Hong Kong Police Force fired 87 rounds of tear gas at protesters, Shum called for Leung Chun-ying to step down as Chief Executive of Hong Kong. On 21 October, Shum was part of a five-member HKFS delegation, which included Chow and Nathan Law, to hold discussions with government officials, conducted by Chief Secretary for Administration Carrie Lam. The meeting failed to bridge the differences between the students and the government.

On 26 November, Shum and fellow activist Joshua Wong were arrested during a protest in Mong Kok. The arrest came after police sought a court order to clear the protest site, in which Shum failed to comply. Shum was charged with criminal contempt of court over his participation in the Mong Kok protest, which he pleaded guilty on 28 November 2017. In his verdict, he received a one-month suspended sentence and a fine.

As the Umbrella Movement dwindled in the following months, Shum said he would focus on strengthening his understanding of Hong Kong–mainland China relations. He reflected, "We will continue to work hard to expand Hong Kong's democracy movement."

== Post-Occupy activism ==
Shum continued his pro-democracy activism after the Umbrella Movement. On 25 February 2015, he spoke at the Geneva Summit for Human Rights and Democracy with Alex Chow to an international audience of human rights activists. During his speech, Shum maintained his optimism about achieving change in Hong Kong through continuous attention and action.

After the 2016 Hong Kong legislative election, Shum found employment as an assistant to localist camp lawmaker Eddie Chu. In April 2019, he filed a judicial review against, and sought an injunction to block, the government's planned transferral of a prime Central Harbourfront site to the unfettered control of the Chinese army. The action followed long-running public concern at the proposed transfer, and Shum stated the government's undertakings contradicted the public access and usage of the harbourfront.

On 4 September 2019, Shum joined Chu and Joshua Wong as the trio arrived at Taipei, where they spoke about the ongoing Hong Kong protests at the Democratic Progressive Party’s headquarters. Shum told the Taiwanese press, "I hope people can brainstorm together on how to win this war against Beijing's white terror and authoritarian rule." The trio also appealed to the Taiwanese government to grant political asylum for the Hong Kong protesters.

After the anti-mask law was introduced on 4 October, Shum and activist Leung Kwok-hung applied to the High Court for an interim injunction to halt the law on the same day. Shum explained the law could interfere with the freedom of expression and the right to peaceful assembly. The injunction was denied.

== Political career ==
=== District Council bid ===
Shum contested in the 2019 Hong Kong District Council election for the Hoi Bun constituency. Part of his electoral platform was to improve the recycling initiatives within his local community. On 28 November 2019, Shum received 56.5% of the votes and won against incumbent Timmy Chow Ping-tim, who held this seat for nearly 30 years since 1991. His victory came amid a pro-democracy wave that prompted a record voter turnout of 79.5% in Hoi Bun, significantly higher than any previous elections.

=== Legislative Council bid and disqualification ===
In June 2020, Shum declared his intention to run for the 2020 Hong Kong legislative election. In his announcement, he planned to renounce his American citizenship, which was a requirement to run in the election. Speaking about his decision, Shum expressed his willingness to stay in Hong Kong and continue his journey with other protesters.

Leading to the pro-democracy primaries, Shum had joined a six-person alliance with candidates Eddie Chu, Joshua Wong, Gwyneth Ho, Sunny Cheung and Tiffany Yuen. In July 2020, he ran in the primary for the District Council (Second) constituency, emerging as the runner-up behind Roy Kwong. He received 129,074 votes, which represented 24.35% of the electorate, and secured a nomination spot in the general election. The primary witnessed high voter turnout even after the national security law was enforced, prompting Shum to remark that "Hong Kong people have still not given up."

On 30 July, the government stated that Shum was among a dozen pro-democracy candidates whose nominations were 'invalid'. Shum's disqualification was determined by an opaque process in which civil servants, who served as returning officers, assessed whether candidates objected to the enactment of the national security law, or expressed sincerity in statements made disavowing separatism.

=== Arrest ===
Including Shum, at least 53 pro-democracy activists were arrested in the morning of 6 January 2021 over their organisation and participation in the primaries. Shum was released on bail on 7 January.

On 28 February 2021, Shum was charged with subversion along with other 46 activists and politicians. On 4 March, he was denied bail and held in custody pending a May court hearing. On 12 March, Shum was denied bail again citing national security risks.

In July 2022, Shum contracted COVID-19 while in prison and was hospitalized for a week before being returned to prison.

==== Conviction pre-trial ====
On 6 May 2021, while awaiting trial along with other pro-democracy activists over the national security case, Shum was sentenced to between four and six months in prison for participating in an unlawful assembly in 2020.

On 14 April 2022, a sentence of six weeks' imprisonment was added to his overall prison term after being convicted of "inciting violence on police officers".

=== National Security Law case ===
In August 2022, Shum pleaded guilty to the charges of violating the national security law and awaits sentencing as of 13 September 2022, along with other 29 activists who also pleaded guilty.

== Personal life ==
Shum is married to Nicole Alexis Yu Sze-long, a former Now TV news anchor. The couple wed in January 2021, as Shum faced re-arrest and conviction under the National Security Law, alert to the greater prison visiting rights of spouses.

From 2014 to 2019, Shum was in a relationship with Willis Ho, former deputy secretary-general of the Hong Kong Federation of Students.

Political offices
| Preceded by Chow Ping-tim | Member of Tsuen Wan District Council; Representative for Hoi Bun; 2020–2021 | Vacant |
