= Riviera Gardens =

Private housing estate in Hong Kong

Coordinates: 22.3621°N 114.1135°E

- Traditional Chinese: 海濱花園
- Simplified Chinese: 海滨花园
- Literal meaning: Promenade
Transcriptions
Standard Mandarin
- Hanyu Pinyin: Hǎibīn Huāyuán
Yue: Cantonese
- Jyutping: hoi2 ban1 faa1 jyun4*2

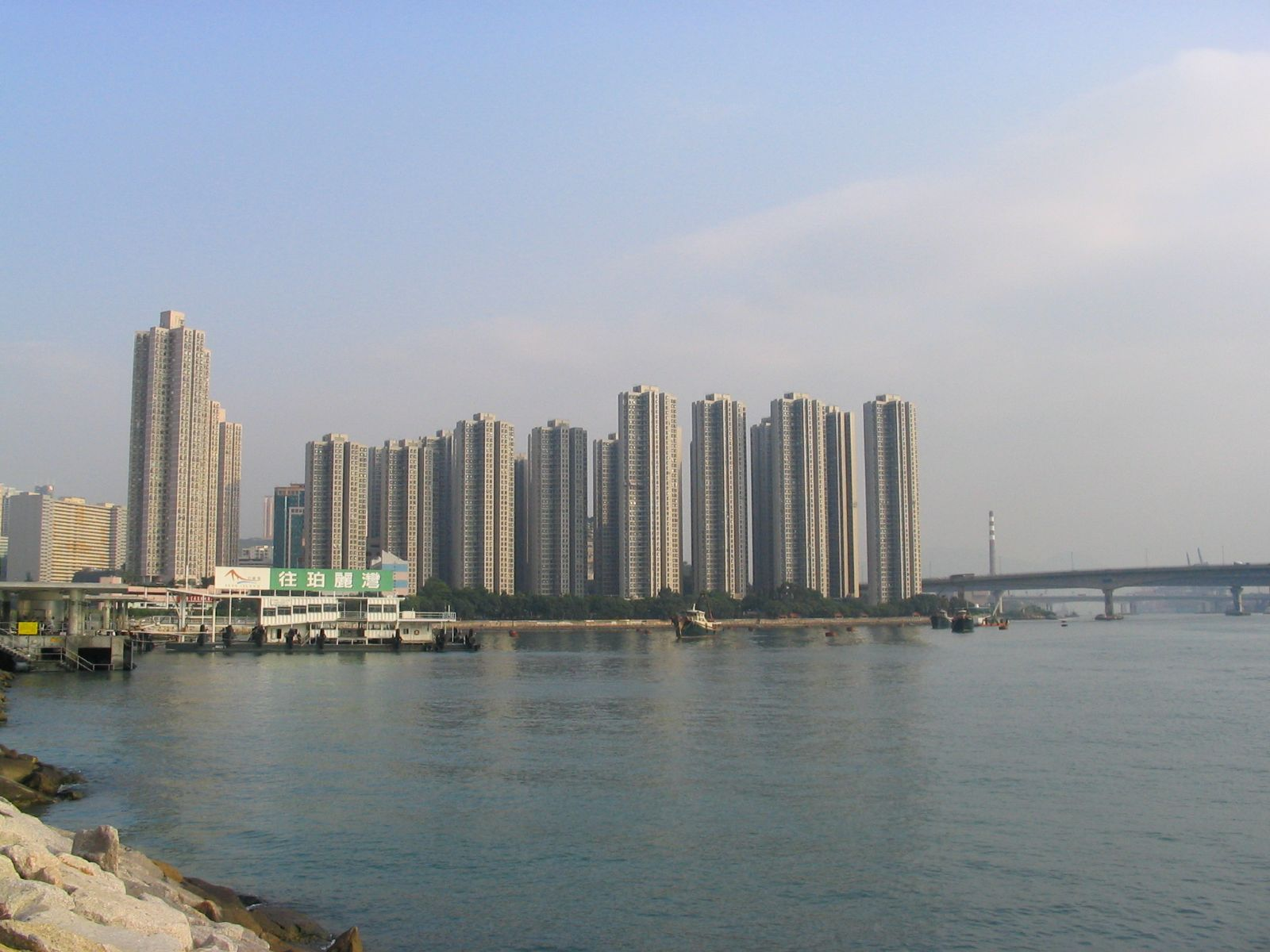
Riviera Gardens, with Tsuen Wan Ferry Pier in the foreground.

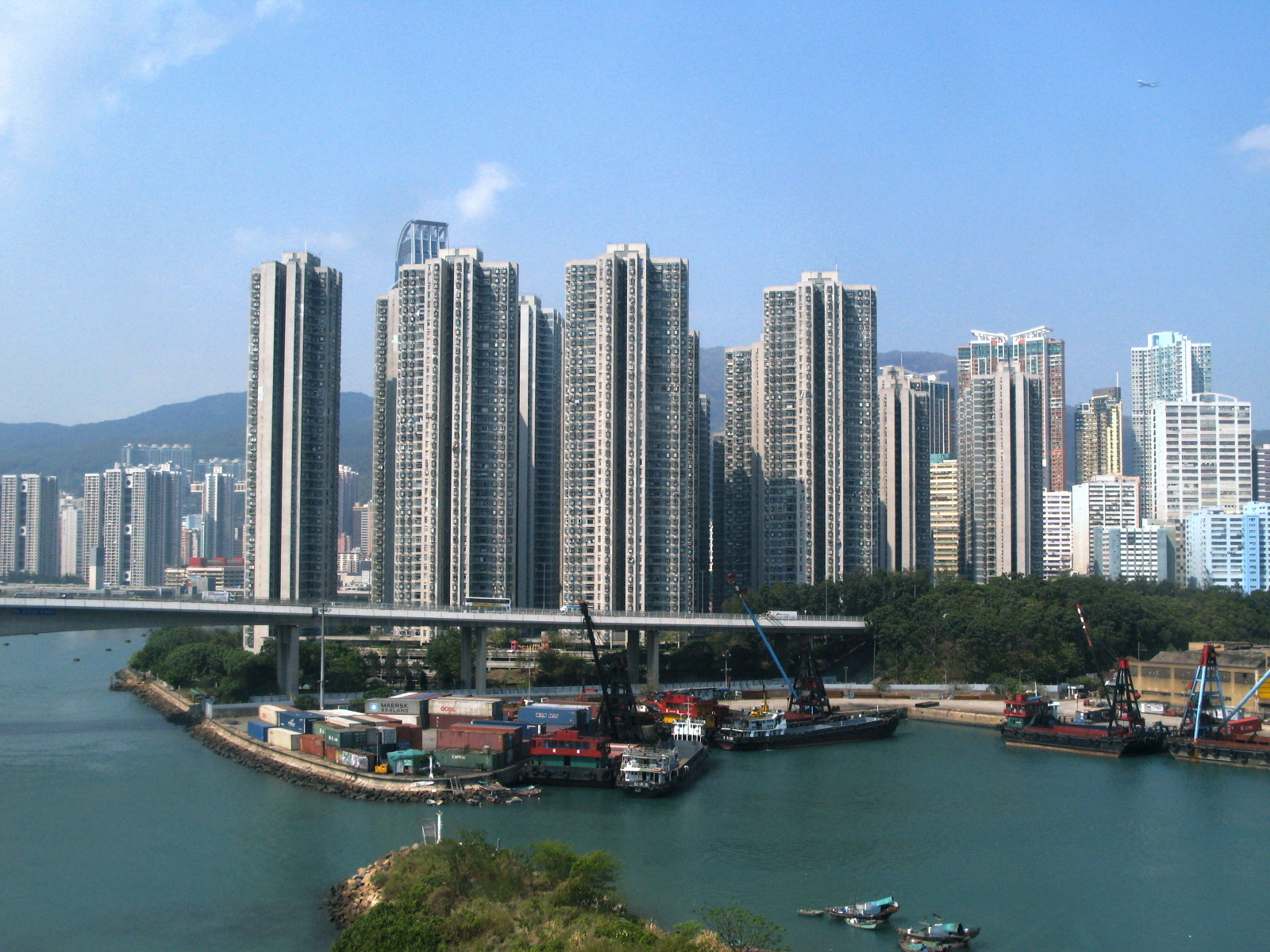
Riviera Gardens, with Tsing Yi North Bridge in the foreground.

Riviera Gardens (Chinese: 海濱花園) is one of the largest private housing estates in Tsuen Wan, New Territories, Hong Kong.

The estate is bounded by Tsing Tsuen Road, Wing Shun Street and Rambler Channel. Formerly the Caltex' oil depot, the estate was developed by New World Development, Tokyu Land, and Caltex Petroleum Corporation. It consists of 19 residential blocks, podium and shopping arcade, which were completed from 1988 to 1990.

== Demographics ==
According to the 2016 by-census, Riviera Gardens had a population of 17,278. The median age was 43.6 and the majority of residents (93.2 per cent) were of Chinese ethnicity. The average household size was 3.2 people. The median monthly household income of all households (i.e. including both economically active and inactive households) was HK$40,000.

== Politics ==
Riviera Gardens is located in Hoi Bun constituency of the Tsuen Wan District Council. It was formerly represented by Lester Shum, who was elected in the 2019 elections until May 2021.

== Education ==
Riviera Gardens is in Primary One Admission (POA) School Net 62, which includes schools in Tsuen Wan and areas nearby. The net includes multiple aided schools and one government school, Hoi Pa Street Government Primary School.

== See also ==
- Wong Tung & Partners
