= Zhou Yongkang (disambiguation) =

Zhou Yongkang is a former senior leader of the Chinese Communist Party. It may also refer to:

- Charles Djou (born 1970), American politician
- Alex Chow (born 1990), Hong Kong social activist
