= Benedict Rogers =

London-based human rights activist

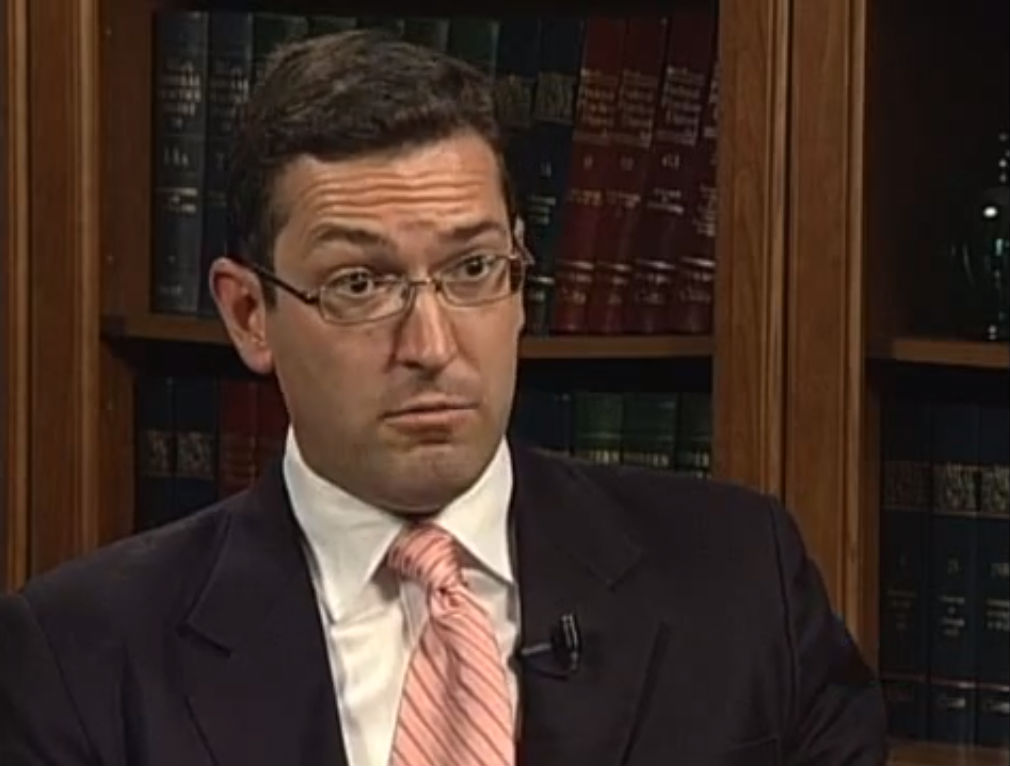
- Rogers in an interview with VOA Burmese in 2010
- Born: 14 June 1974 (age 51); London, England
- Education: Royal Holloway (BA); School of Oriental & African Studies (MA)
- Occupations: Journalist human rights activist

Chinese name
- Chinese: 羅哲思
Transcriptions
Standard Mandarin
- Hanyu Pinyin: Luó Zhé Sī
Yue: Cantonese
- Yale Romanization: Lòh Jiht Sī
- Jyutping: Lo^{4} Zit^{3} Si^{1}

Benedict Richard Victor Rogers (Chinese: 羅哲思, born 14 June 1974) is a British human rights activist and journalist based in London. His work focuses on Asia, particularly Burma, North Korea, Indonesia, the Maldives, East Timor, Pakistan and Hong Kong. He is a regular contributor to The Wall Street Journal, The New York Times and The Huffington Post and has appeared on BBC, CNN, Sky, Al Jazeera and other television and radio stations.

He is the co-founder and deputy chairman of the Conservative Party's human rights commission and the co-founder of the International Coalition to Stop Crimes Against Humanity in North Korea. He is also the East Asia Team Leader at Christian Solidarity Worldwide and the founder of Hong Kong Watch. He is also a member of the advisory group of the Inter-Parliamentary Alliance on China (IPAC) and an advisor to the World Uyghur Congress. He became the Chief Executive of Hong Kong Watch in September 2020 and continues to hold that position. He has written three books which focus on Burma and co-authored two others on Christian human rights obligations.

== Early life and education ==
Rogers was born in London and graduated in 1996 with a Bachelor of Arts in Modern History and Politics from Royal Holloway and a Master of Arts in China Studies in 1997 from the School of Oriental and African Studies (SOAS), both of which are constituent colleges of the University of London.

== Career ==
Rogers is the East Asia Team Leader at the international human rights organisation Christian Solidarity Worldwide (CSW), where he oversees the organisation's work in the region.

In 2010, he spent five days in Pyongyang, North Korea, with Lord Alton of Liverpool and Baroness Cox of Queensbury, both members of the House of Lords. They met with North Korean officials and summarised their concerns about the nation's human rights abuses. They encouraged officials to invite Marzuki Darusman, who was the UN Special Rapporteur on the situation of human rights in the Democratic People's Republic of Korea at the time, into the country to open prison camps in North Korea to international monitors including the International Committee of the Red Cross (ICRC) and to suspend executions. In 2011 he co-founded the International Coalition to Stop Crimes Against Humanity in North Korea (ICNK). He has also lived in and travelled to East Timor and China, and previously worked on Pakistan and Sri Lanka.

Rogers regularly briefs senior Government ministers and officials, UK members of parliament, the European Union, United Nations officials, US Congressional offices and the State Department on human rights and freedom of religion in Asia. He has also testified in hearings at the House of Commons, the European Parliament, the National Diet of Japan and the United States Congress. He has also organised several investigative humanitarian trips to Burma's borders for British and European parliamentarians.

He is a regular contributor to international media, including The Wall Street Journal, International Herald Tribune, The Telegraph, The Spectator, and The Huffington Post. He wrote for the Hong Kong Standard between 2000 and 2002.

=== Barred entry to Hong Kong ===
On 11 October 2017, Rogers was barred entry to Hong Kong. He arrived at Hong Kong International Airport on a flight from Bangkok but was escorted away by immigration officials and placed on a flight back to Thailand. He had previously been warned by a contact in the Chinese embassy in London that he might be refused entry to Hong Kong. Rogers, who lived and worked as a journalist in Hong Kong between 1997 and 2002, has criticised China's increasing threat to democracy in Hong Kong and has campaigned against the imprisonment of pro-democracy activists Joshua Wong, Nathan Law and Alex Chow. British Foreign Secretary Boris Johnson demanded an explanation from the Hong Kong authorities and the Chinese government. Hua Chunying, a spokeswoman for the Chinese Foreign Ministry, later responded that the move was within China's sovereignty and said: "Whether this person's trip to Hong Kong involved an intention to intervene in Hong Kong's internal affairs and judicial independence – he knows very well himself."

The following day, Rogers announced he would form a non-governmental organisation (NGO) to monitor the rule of law and human rights in Hong Kong. Hong Kong Watch was launched at a reception hosted in Speaker's House, House of Commons in the Parliament of the United Kingdom on 11 December 2017.

In March 2022, the Hong Kong police accused Rogers of "jeopardising China's national security" and told him that he faces charges of "collusion with foreign forces" (with a penalty of three years in jail) if he ever returns to the city.

== Works ==
=== Books ===
- A Land Without Evil: Stopping the Genocide of Burma's Karen People (2004) (ISBN 978-0825460593)
- On the Side of Angels: Justice, Human Rights and Kingdom Mission – with Joseph D'souza (2007) (ISBN 978-0830857203)
- Than Shwe: Unmasking Burma's Tyrant (2010, Silkworm Books) (ISBN 978-9749511916)
- The Very Stones Cry Out: The Persecuted Church – Pain, Passion and Praise – with Baroness Caroline Cox (2011) (ISBN 978-0826442727)
- Burma: A Nation at the Crossroads (2012, Random House) (ISBN 978-1448118656)
- The China Nexus: Thirty Years In and Around Chinese Communist Party's Tyranny (2022, Optimum Publishing International) (ISBN 978-0888903273)

=== Reports ===
- Carrying the Cross: The military regime's campaign of restriction, discrimination and persecution against Christians in Burma (CSW, 2007)
- Indonesia: Pluralism in Peril – The Rise of Religious Intolerance Across the Archipelago (CSW, 2014)
- Burma's Identity Crisis (CSW, 2019)
