= Willis Ho =

Hong Kong journalist and activist

Willis Ho Kit-wang (Chinese: 何潔泓, born 15 July 1991) is a Hong Kong journalist, activist and documentary filmmaker. She was a deputy secretary-general of Hong Kong Federation of Students, and the convenor of Land Justice League. In 2017, she was jailed for participating in Hong Kong land justice movement.

== Biography ==
Ho was raised by a single mother and has a twin sister. The summer before her HKALE, Ho and her sister participated in Anti-Hong Kong Express Rail Link movement.

Ho studied Philosophy in Lingnan University. In 2012-13 was the Vice-President (External) of its Student Union and a committee member at Hong Kong Federation of Students. She became one of the deputy secretary-general of HKFS the following year.

In 2016, she was sentenced to serve community service for protesting against the government's funding request to develop the northeast New Territories by storming into the Legislative Council in June 2014, along with 12 others. The Department of Justice appealed, and she was sentenced to 13 months in prison in August 2017, which is the most serious sentence for similar cases in Hong Kong. Ho appealed and was granted bail in November. Her sentence was ultimately overturned.

As a journalist, she worked on investigative stories about minorities in Hong Kong. She is currently working on a documentary about the 2019–20 Hong Kong protests.
