= Tin Wan (constituency) =

- Elected constituency for the Southern District Council
- Boundary of Tin Wan in Southern District
- District: Southern
- Legislative Council constituency: Hong Kong Island West
- Population: 18,081 (2019)
- Electorate: 9,805 (2019)

Current constituency
- Created: 1991
- Number of members: One
- Member: Tiffany Yuen Ka-wai (Independent)

Tin Wan is one of the 17 constituencies in the Southern District, Hong Kong. The constituency returns one district councillor to the Southern District Council, with an election every four years.

Tin Wan constituency is loosely based on Tin Wan Estate and Hung Fuk Court in Aberdeen with estimated population of 16,716.

== Councillors represented ==
Election	Member	Party
1999	Miu Wah-chang	DAB
2004 by-election	Chan Fu-ming	Nonpartisan
2019	Tiffany Yuen Ka-wai→Vacant (Note: Unseated on 20 May 2021 after being arrested under national security law.)	Independent democrat

== Election results ==
=== 2010s ===
Southern District Council Election, 2019: Tin Wan
Party	Candidate	Votes	%	±%
Ind. democrat	Tiffany Yuen Ka-wai	4,191	61.70	
Independent	Chan Fu-ming	2,602	38.30	
Majority		1,589	23.40	
Turnout		6,838	69.79	
Ind. democrat gain from Independent		Swing		

Southern District Council Election, 2015: Tin Wan
Party	Candidate	Votes	%	±%
Nonpartisan	Chan Fu-ming	Unopposed		
Nonpartisan hold		Swing		

Southern District Council Election, 2011: Tin Wan
Party	Candidate	Votes	%	±%
Nonpartisan	Chan Fu-ming	Unopposed		
Nonpartisan hold		Swing		

=== 2000s ===
Southern District Council Election, 2007: Tin Wan
Party	Candidate	Votes	%	±%
Nonpartisan	Chan Fu-ming	Unopposed		
Nonpartisan hold		Swing		

Tin Wan by-election 2004
Party	Candidate	Votes	%	±%
Nonpartisan	Chan Fu-ming	1,423	35.98	
Frontier	Wong Huk-kam	1,170	29.58	
Nonpartisan	Kwan Man-yau	1,165	29.46	−13.77
Independent	Fung Wa-hing	91	2.30	
Nonpartisan	Chong Yui	87	2.20	
Nonpartisan	Chan Pak-chuen	19	0.48	
Majority		243	6.40	
Nonpartisan gain from DAB		Swing		

Southern District Council Election, 2003: Tin Wan
Party	Candidate	Votes	%	±%
DAB	Miu Wah-chang	2,179	56.77	
Nonpartisan	Kwan Man-yau	1,659	43.23	
Majority		520	13.54	
DAB hold		Swing		

=== 1990s ===
Southern District Council Election, 1999: Tin Wan
Party	Candidate	Votes	%	±%
DAB	Miu Wah-chang	Unopposed		
DAB win (new seat)				
