= Eddie Chan =

Hong Kong politician and social activist

- 陳樹暉
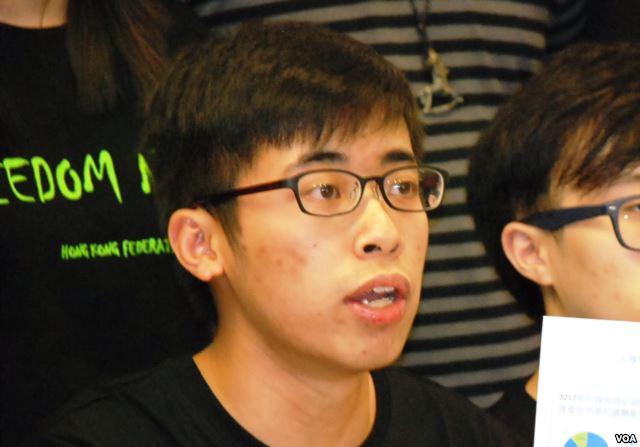

Member of Yuen Long District Council
- In office 1 January 2020 – 8 July 2021

Secretary-General of the Hong Kong Federation of Students
- In office 2013–2014
- Succeeded by: Alex Chow Wing Hong

Personal details
- Born: 29 October 1990 (age 35) British Hong Kong
- Party: Team Chu Hoi-dick of New Territories West
- Education: Tak Sun Secondary School; Lingnan University

Eddie Chan Shu-fai
- Traditional Chinese: 陳樹暉
- Simplified Chinese: 陈树晖
Transcriptions
Standard Mandarin
- Hanyu Pinyin: Chén Shùhuī
Yue: Cantonese
- Jyutping: can4 syu6 fai1

Eddie Chan Shu-fai (Chinese: 陳樹暉, born 29 October 1990) is a Hong Kong pro-democracy politician of the New Territories West, social activist, former vice-convener of the Civil Human Rights Front, Secretary of the Hong Kong Catholic Justice and Peace Committee, president of the Lingnan University Student Union, Secretary-General of the Hong Kong Federation of Students and a former district Councillor for the Yuen Long District.

In May 2013, he along with 10 other activists filed a complaint against the police at the Independent Police Complaints Council (IPCC) for brutality against protesters.

== Politics ==
Chan ran for the Yuen Long District in the 2019 Hong Kong local elections and won with over 1775 votes, which represented 52.2% of the total votes cast.
