= Hoi Bun (constituency) =

- Elected constituency for the Tsuen Wan District Council
- Boundary of Hoi Bun in Tsuen Wan District
- District: Tsuen Wan
- Legislative Council constituency: New Territories South West
- Population: 18,556 (2019)
- Electorate: 11,421 (2019)

Current constituency
- Created: 1991
- Number of members: One
- Member: Vacant

Hoi Bun (Chinese: 海濱) is one of the 19 constituencies in the Tsuen Wan District of Hong Kong which was created in 1991.

The constituency loosely covers Riviera Gardens in Tsuen Wan with the estimated population of 18,556.

== Councillors represented ==
Election	Member	Party
1991	Timmy Chow Ping-tim	Independent
2019	Lester Shum→Vacant	TCHDNTW

== Election results ==
=== 2010s ===
Tsuen Wan District Council Election, 2019: Hoi Bun
Party	Candidate	Votes	%	±%
Team Chu (PfD)	Lester Shum	5,113	56.50	
Independent	Chow Ping-tim	1,974	21.81	−36.09
Independent	Marcus Mok Yuen-kwan	1,940	21.44	
PfD	Leo Chan Yue-hai	22	0.24	
Majority		3,139	34.69	
Turnout		9,081	79.51	
Team Chu gain from Independent		Swing		

Tsuen Wan District Council Election, 2015: Hoi Bun
Party	Candidate	Votes	%	±%
Independent	Tmmy Chow Ping-tim	2,647	57.9	+7.3
Nonpartisan	Cheng Pak-keung	1,926	42.1	+18.6
Majority		721	15.8	–8.9
Turnout		4,919	48.2	
Independent hold		Swing		

Tsuen Wan District Council Election, 2011: Hoi Bun
Party	Candidate	Votes	%	±%
Independent	Chow Ping-tim	2,209	50.6	–15.6
People Power	Lee Wai-yee	1,129	25.9	
Nonpartisan	Cheng Pak-keung	1,028	23.5	
Majority		1,018	24.7	–8.3
Turnout		4,366	47.7	
Independent hold		Swing		

=== 2000s ===
Tsuen Wan District Council Election, 2007: Hoi Bun
Party	Candidate	Votes	%	±%
Nonpartisan	Chow Ping-tim	2,182	66.5	
LSD	Law Ka-kei	1,097	33.5	
Majority		1,085	33.0	–7,6
Nonpartisan hold		Swing		

Tsuen Wan District Council Election, 2003: Hoi Bun
Party	Candidate	Votes	%	±%
Nonpartisan	Chow Ping-tim	1,839	53.4	
Nonpartisan	Chung Ming	1,603	46.6	
Majority		236	6.8	
Nonpartisan hold		Swing		

=== 1990s ===
Tsuen Wan District Council Election, 1999: Hoi Bun
Party	Candidate	Votes	%	±%
Nonpartisan	Chow Ping-tim	1,736	61.6	
Nonpartisan	Fung Yee-chiu	1,052	37.4	
Majority		684	24.2	
Nonpartisan hold		Swing		

Tsuen Wan District Board Election, 1994: Hoi Bun
Party	Candidate	Votes	%	±%
Nonpartisan	Chow Ping-tim	Unopposed		
Nonpartisan hold		Swing		

Tsuen Wan District Board Election, 1991: Hoi Bun
Party	Candidate	Votes	%	±%
Nonpartisan	Chow Ping-tim	1,302	62.9	
TWRA	Wat Wing-yee	524	25.3	
Nonpartisan	Cheung Wing-hei	230	11.1	
Majority		778	37.6	
Nonpartisan win (new seat)				
