= Tiffany Yuen =

Hong Kong politician (born 1993)

- 袁嘉蔚
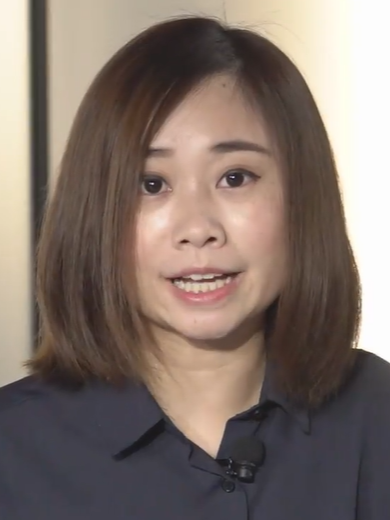

Vice Chairperson of Demosistō
- In office 4 December 2017 – 12 May 2018
- Preceded by: Oscar Lai
- Succeeded by: Isaac Cheng

Member of the Southern District Council
- In office 1 January 2020 – 20 May 2021
- Preceded by: Chan Fu-ming
- Constituency: Tin Wan

Personal details
- Born: 30 September 1993 (age 33) British Hong Kong
- Party: Independent; Demosistō (2016–2018)
- Spouse: Frankie Fung
- Education: City University of Hong Kong
Tiffany Yuen
- Traditional Chinese: 袁嘉蔚
- Simplified Chinese: 袁嘉蔚
Transcriptions
Standard Mandarin
- Hanyu Pinyin: Yuán Jiāwèi
Yue: Cantonese
- Jyutping: jyun4 gaa1 wai3

Tiffany Yuen Ka-wai (Chinese: 袁嘉蔚; born 30 September 1993) is a Hong Kong activist and politician, who has been a member of the Southern District Council for Tin Wan since 2020. She was the vice chairperson of Demosistō before resigning from the party in 2018. For her participation in the 2020 Hong Kong pro-democracy primaries, she was arrested in January 2021 along with over 50 other pro-democrats on national security charges. She received a four-year jail term, and was released in August 2025.

== Activism ==
Yuen was educated at the City University of Hong Kong and graduated with a bachelor's degree in Chinese Language. She was dedicated to activism during her student life, including Yuen's participation in the 2013 Hong Kong dock strike and the protests against the North East New Territories New Development Areas Planning. She was also committed to the Umbrella Revolution in 2014.

After joining the Demosistō party in 2016, Yuen was elected vice chairperson in 2017 and focused her efforts on community outreach. In light of Demosistō members losing their candidacy due to their promotion of "democratic self-determination", Yuen left the party in 2018 to continue her community services in Tin Wan Estate as an independent. Speaking of her departure, Yuen stated, "In a normal society, no election runner should be deprived of the right because of his political views." Subsequently, Yuen had found employment as an assistant to pro-democracy legislator Au Nok-hin.

Yuen has a long history of championing equality, women's rights, and LGBT rights in Hong Kong. She was a panel speaker at Women's Festival Hong Kong in 2018 and 2019, the city's sole festival dedicated to womanhood. She spoke to the media condemning instances of sexual harassment and police brutality. Yuen was among the politicians who denounced the homophobic language used by lawmaker Kwok Wai-keung. According to Yuen, these experiences of discrimination served as the motivation in her commitment to equality.

== Political career ==
=== District Council ===
Yuen ran in the 2019 District Council election for the Tin Wan constituency, where she pledged her commitment to improve the living conditions of the local residents. Her opponent was the pro-Beijing incumbent Chan Fu-ming, who held his position since 2007 and remained uncontested until he was challenged by Yuen. On 25 November, she defeated Chan with 61.7% of the votes, earning Yuen a seat on the Southern District Council.

=== Legislative Council bid and arrest ===
In 2020, Yuen announced her intention to run in the Hong Kong legislative election within the Hong Kong Island constituency. She was endorsed by former Demosistō chairman and legislator Nathan Law, who withdrew from the election and left Hong Kong in light of the national security law that was passed. Yuen contested in the pro-democracy primaries, where she emerged as the runner-up behind incumbent legislator Ted Hui of the Democratic Party. She obtained 19,884 votes, representing 21.94% of the electorate, and secured a nomination spot in the general election.

On 27 July, Yuen fielded questions from the returning officer to determine her eligibility to run in the election, an opaque process that nominally determined whether she had objected to the enactment of the national security law, or was sincere in statements made disavowing separatism. As part of her response, Yuen took down an Instagram photo that displayed the words "Liberate Hong Kong, revolution of our times". She had uploaded the photo earlier in January before the slogan was banned in July based on the national security law.

On 30 July, Yuen was told her election nomination was 'invalid', as one of a dozen pro-democracy candidates disqualified on the same day, including Demosistō founder Joshua Wong.

On 6 January 2021, Yuen was among 53 members of the pro-democratic camp who were arrested under the national security law, specifically its provision regarding alleged subversion. The group stood accused of the organisation of and participation in the July 2020 primaries. Yuen was released on bail on 7 January. On 28 February 2021, Yuen was arrested again and charged with "conspiring to subvert state power" along with 46 other activists and politicians under the national security law. She was denied bail on 12 March and has remained in prison since then.

On 6 May 2021, Yuen was sentenced to four months in prison for participating in an unauthorised assembly to mark the 2020 Tiananmen anniversary.

In September 2021, the Correctional Services Department stated that it had quashed a protest of 18 inmates at the Lo Wu Correctional Institution which had been in response to disciplinary action against six other inmates. According to news reports, Yuen was among the 18 protesters.

== Personal life ==
Yuen was previously in a long-term relationship with Nathan Law. The two broke up in 2019, citing personality differences but remained on amicable terms. After her release from prison in August 2025, Yuen announced that she had married Frankie Fung, a fellow former prisoner of the Hong Kong 47 who had been released in July; Yuen's lawyer had previously revealed, without disclosing her partner's identity, that Yuen had married while in custody. After her release, she disclosed her spouse is Frankie Fung, who is also a convicted in the case.

In August 2020, Yuen launched a YouTube channel called "Faan Hou ABC" (番號ABC) with fellow activists Lily Wong and Ho Ka-yau. Their videos explore various topics related to sex education and sex positivity. As of February 2021, the channel has accumulated over 20,000 subscribers.

Party political offices
Preceded by Oscar Lai	Vice Chairperson of Demosistō; 2017–2018	Succeeded by Issac Cheng
Political offices
Preceded by Chan Fu-ming	Member of Southern District Council; Representative for Tin Wan; 2020–2021	Vacant
