= Hong Kong Federation of Students =

Student organisation in Hong Kong

- Formation: May 1958
- Location: 9/F., Waitex House, 7-9 Mongkok Road, Kowloon, Hong Kong
- Coordinates: 22°19′12.1″N 114°09′58.5″E
- Secretary-General: Timothy H. L. Lee
- Affiliations: Pan-democracy camp
- Website: hkfs.org.hk

Hong Kong Federation of Students
- Traditional Chinese: 香港專上學生聯會
- Simplified Chinese: 香港专上学生联会
Transcriptions
Standard Mandarin
- Hanyu Pinyin: Xiānggǎng Zhuānshàng Xuésheng Liánhuì
Yue: Cantonese
- Jyutping: Hoeng^{1} gong^{2} zyun^{1} soeng^{6} hok^{6} saang^{1} lyun^{4} wui^{6*2}

HKFS
- Traditional Chinese: 學聯
- Simplified Chinese: 学联
Transcriptions
Standard Mandarin
- Hanyu Pinyin: Xuélián
Yue: Cantonese
- Jyutping: hok^{6} lyun^{4}

The Hong Kong Federation of Students (HKFS, Chinese: 香港專上學生聯會 or 學聯) is a student organisation founded in May 1958 by the student unions of four higher education institutions in Hong Kong. The inaugural committee had seven members representing the four schools. The purpose of the HKFS is to promote student movements and to enhance the student body's engagement in society. Since the 1990s, the federation has taken an interest in daily events in Hong Kong, and no longer restricts itself to the areas of education and politics. The HKFS council (代表會) is convened by representatives of the university student unions. The representatives are elected by the university students. A standing committee is appointed by the council.

== 1970s ==
In 1971, the Senkaku Islands dispute arose. The administration of the Senkaku/Diaoyutai Islands was transferred from the United States to Japan. On 14 February 1971, the Hong Kong Action Committee in Defence of the Diaoyutai Islands was established(香港保衛釣魚台行動委員會/香港保卫钓鱼台行动委员会). The Action Committee held demonstrations in front of the Japanese consulate in Hong Kong. Twenty-one people were arrested, seven of whom were university students. On 17 April, the Hong Kong University Students' Union held a peaceful demonstration involving about 1000 students. On 7 July, the HKFS held a demonstration on a larger scale. In 1971, the HKFS was an illegal organisation and some students were arrested by the Royal Hong Kong Police. On 13 May 1975, the federation held its last protest over the issue.

During 1975 and 1976, the standing committee of the HKFS voiced its support for the Cultural Revolution in mainland China. The committee criticised Mak Chung Man, who led students to protest against the communists and said he was "against all the Chinese". Students resented this statement and the issue became the main topic of debate during the HKFS elections of 1976.

In April 1977, the Hong Kong University Students' Union suggested the removal of the words "anti-right wing" from the action guide of the HKFS but the standing committee refused to vote. All delegates from the Hong Kong University Students' Union withdrew from the HKFS in protest.

In April 1979, the HKFS commemorated the May Fourth Movement. The event was poorly attended.

== 1980s and 1990s ==
During the 1980s, the HKFS began to support democracy in Taiwan and mainland China. In 1981, the Hong Kong Standard revealed that the HKFS had been placed on a "Red List" in a classified Standing Committee on Pressure Groups (SCOPG) report for being "pro-communist". In March 1983, the HKFS reported the Shue Yan College to the Hong Kong Independent Commission against Corruption but no prosecution was launched. After 1984, the HKFS changed from supporting communism to fully supporting democratic development.

In February 1989, about 4000 students boycotted their classes to protest against the policy of the Hong Kong Education Department. During the Tiananmen Square protests of 1989, the HKFS took part in China-wide demonstrations and strikes. On 20 May, when the tropical cyclone signal number 8 was hoisted, thousands of students took part in a massive demonstration. After the 4 June massacre, all of the HKFS represented university students stopped attending classes. In 1991, there were protests (said by police to be illegal) to support the dissident, Wang Dan.

== 2000s ==
In 2003, 2004 and 2005, the HKFS took an active part in the 1 July marches.

== 2010s ==
In 2014, the HKFS, led by Alex Chow and Lester Shum, was a participating organisation in the Umbrella Movement. The movement demanded genuine democracy in future chief executive elections. Admiralty, Causeway Bay and Mong Kok were occupied by suffragists for two months.

Some democratic activists criticised the HKFS for failing to lead the movement. In early 2015, five of the member organisations held disaffiliation referendums. Four passed, reducing the number of member organisations from eight to four. The results are as follows:

Referendums on disaffiliation from the Hong Kong Federation of Students
Voting period	Member	Yes %	No %	Abstain %	Invalid %	Total #	Turnout	Result
9-13 Feb 2015	HKUSU	41.4	37.4	21.2	–	6093	38.4%	Disaffiliate
10-12 Mar 2015	LUSU	34.0	56.9	8.2	0.9	1067	30.0%	Affiliate
16-22 Apr 2015	HKPUSU	68.7	23.3	7.3	0.8	1733	10.4%	Disaffiliate
20-23 Apr 2015	HKBUSU	55.7	36.5	6.4	1.4	1678	14.4%	Disaffiliate
28 Apr – 6 May 2015	CityUSU	76.1	16.3	5.4	2.2	3237	19.3%	Disaffiliate

Amidst this push for localism in Hong Kong, the HKFS was, for the first time, absent from the Victoria Park candlelight vigil commemorating the 1989 Tiananmen Massacre.

== Members ==
The Hong Kong Federation of Students is formed by the student unions of four institutions:

- Chinese University Students' Union
- Lingnan University Students' Union
- Hong Kong Shue Yan University Students' Union
- Hong Kong University of Science and Technology Students' Union

Former members were:

- Hong Kong University Students' Union
- Hong Kong Baptist University Students' Union
- City University Students' Union
- Hong Kong Polytechnic University Students' Union

Period	Years	Secretariat		Representative Council				Standing committee
Period	Years	Secretary-General	Other members	Chairman	Vice Chairman	Secretary	Central Representatives	Standing committee
54th	2011-12	Daisy Chan	-	Sam Wong	Leo Tang	-	Fredrik Fan	-
55th	2012-13	Samuel Li	Ben Lam (Deputy)	Jacky Lai	Rowan Tang	Leo Tang	Queenie Chu; Daisy Chan; Sam Wong	-
56th	2013-14	Eddie Chan	Willis Ho (Deputy); Johnson Yeung (Deputy)	Chan Man-fai	Law Kun-kit	Lam Siu-kit	Rowan Tang	-
57th	2014-15	Alex Chow	Lester Shum (Deputy)	-	Law Cheuk Yiu Ivan	-	Lai Choi Yin Chio Ka Fai	Yvonne Leung (HKUSU) Gary Fong (CUSU) Victor Wong (BUSU) Lai Wai-kin (PUSU) Dennis Yip (HKUSTSU) Nathan Law Kwun-chung (LUSU) Ting Ka-ki (CityUSU) Chan Kok-hin (SYUSU)
58th	2015-16	Nathan Law Kwun-chung	Victor Wong (Deputy) Wong Ka-fai (Deputy)	Lai Wai-kin	Shek Pui-yin	-	Law Wai-lun Ding Ka-Kat	Kwok Chui-ying (CUSU) Sunny Cheung (BUSU) Flora Wong (PUSU) Sunny Leung Hiu-yeung (CityUSU) Shek Tsz-kin (HKUSTSU) Katherine Ko (LUSU) Shui Ling Tjhan (SYUSU)
59th	2016-17	Jacky Chan Man-hei	-	Wong Kin-long	Shui Ling Tjhan	-	Chan Kok-hin Kwok Chui-ying	Wong Chee-yan (CUSU) Andy Lam (HKUSTSU) Alice Cheung (LUSU) Liu Chun-sing (SYUSU)
