= Nathan Law =

Hong Kong activist (born 1993)

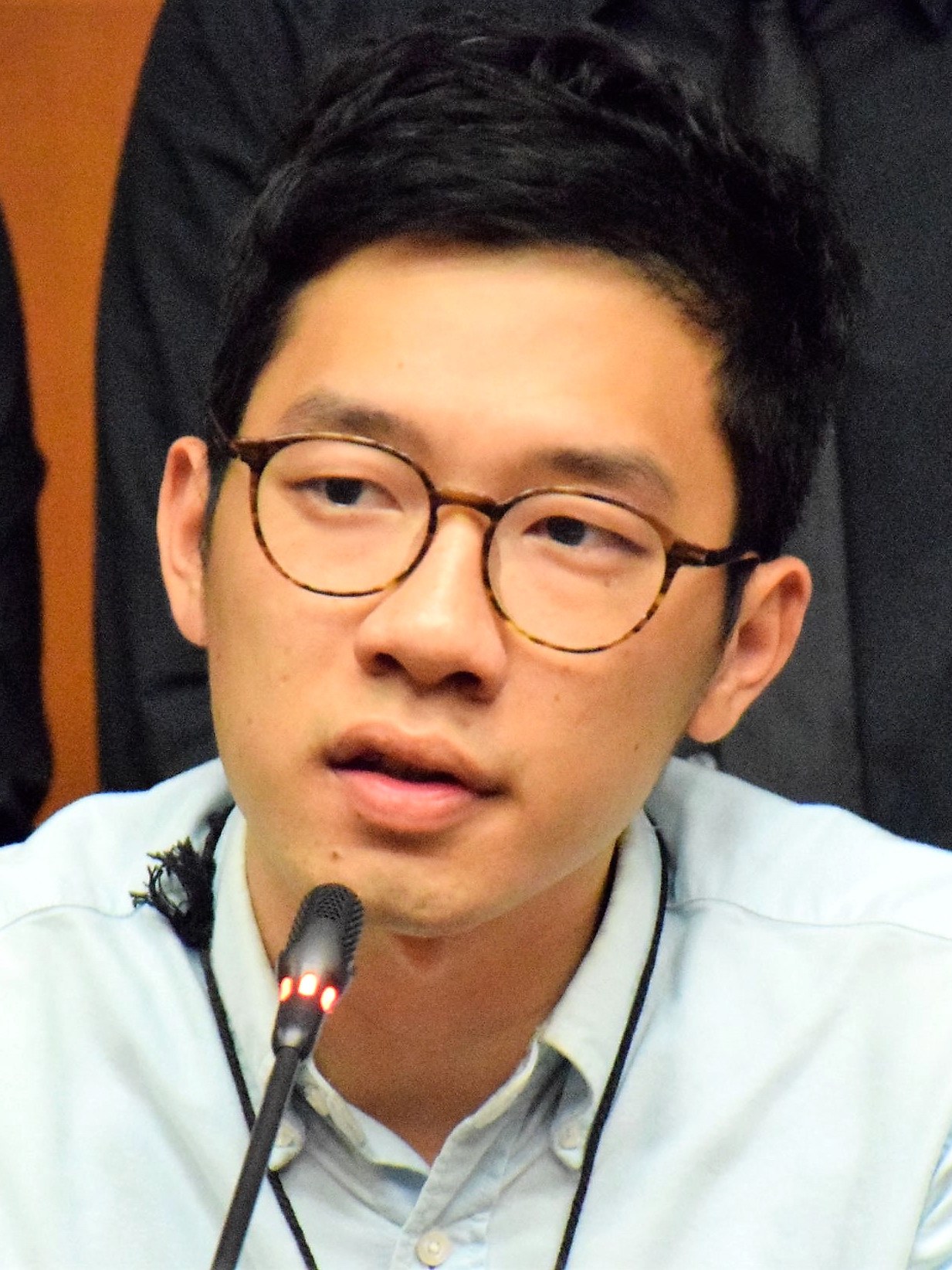
- Law in 2018

Chairman of Demosistō
- In office 10 April 2016 – 16 May 2018
- Deputy: Oscar Lai; Tiffany Yuen
- Leader: Joshua Wong
- Preceded by: Office established
- Succeeded by: Ivan Lam

Member of Legislative Council
- In office 1 October 2016 – 14 July 2017 (Note: Law served as member of the Legislative Council until 14 July 2017 when his oath on 12 October 2016 was invalidated and his seat was vacated according to the ruling of the Court of First Instance.)
- Preceded by: Jasper Tsang
- Succeeded by: Au Nok-hin
- Constituency: Hong Kong Island

58th Secretary General of Hong Kong Federation of Students
- In office 1 April 2015 – 31 March 2016
- Preceded by: Alex Chow
- Succeeded by: Chan Man-hei

Personal details
- Born: Luo Guancong; 13 July 1993 (age 33) Shenzhen, Guangdong, China
- Party: Demosistō (2016–2020)
- Education: Lingnan University (BA); Yale University (MA)
- Occupation: Politician
- Known for: 2014 Hong Kong protests; Umbrella Movement
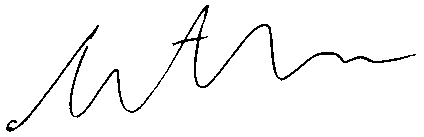
- Signature

Chinese name
- Traditional Chinese: 羅冠聰
- Simplified Chinese: 罗冠聪
Transcriptions
Standard Mandarin
- Hanyu Pinyin: Luó Guàncōng
Yue: Cantonese
- Yale Romanization: Lòh Gunchūng
- Jyutping: Lo4 Gun3 Cung1

Nathan Law Kwun-chung (Note: In this Hong Kong name, the surname is Law. In accordance with Hong Kong custom, the Western-style name is Nathan Law and the Chinese-style name is Law Kwun-chung.) (Chinese: 羅冠聰; born 13 July 1993) is a Hong Kong activist and politician. As a student leader, he was chairman of the Representative Council of the Lingnan University Students' Union (LUSU), acting president of the LUSU, and secretary-general of the Hong Kong Federation of Students (HKFS). He was one of the student leaders during the 79-day Umbrella Movement in 2014. He is the founding and former chairman of Demosistō, a new political party derived from the 2014 protests.

On 4 September 2016, at the age of 23, Law was elected to serve as a legislator for Hong Kong Island, making him the youngest lawmaker in the history of the Legislative Council of Hong Kong. Over his controversial oath-taking at the Legislative Council inaugural meeting, his office was challenged by the Hong Kong Government which resulted in his disqualification from the Legislative Council on 14 July 2017.

Following the enactment of the National Security Law on 1 July 2020, Law left for London and began his self-exile. In April 2021, he was granted political asylum. Hong Kong police had ordered the arrest of Nathan Law for inciting secession and collusion, and issued a HK$1 million bounty for his apprehension in July 2023.

In March 2021, Law was named a Pritzker Fellow at the University of Chicago's Institute of Politics. In May 2022, Law received an honorary doctorate from Washington & Jefferson College and was the keynote speaker at the school's 2022 commencement ceremony.

In July 2023, Hong Kong police offered HKD 1 million (US$127,644) bounties for information leading to the capture of eight prominent democracy activists based abroad including Nathan Law and wanted for national security crimes.

== Early life and education ==
Law was born on 13 July 1993 in Shenzhen, Guangdong, China, to a Hong Kong father and a Mainland mother. He moved to Hong Kong with his mother for a family reunion when he was around six years old. He and his siblings were raised almost single-handedly by his mother. He received his secondary education at HKFEW Wong Cho Bau Secondary School and majored in Cultural Studies at Lingnan University (LU). In 2019, he accepted an offer with a full scholarship from the Council on East Asian Studies of Yale University and started the study to pursue a master's degree in East Asian Studies in mid-August. He graduated a year later with the master's degree.

== Student activism ==
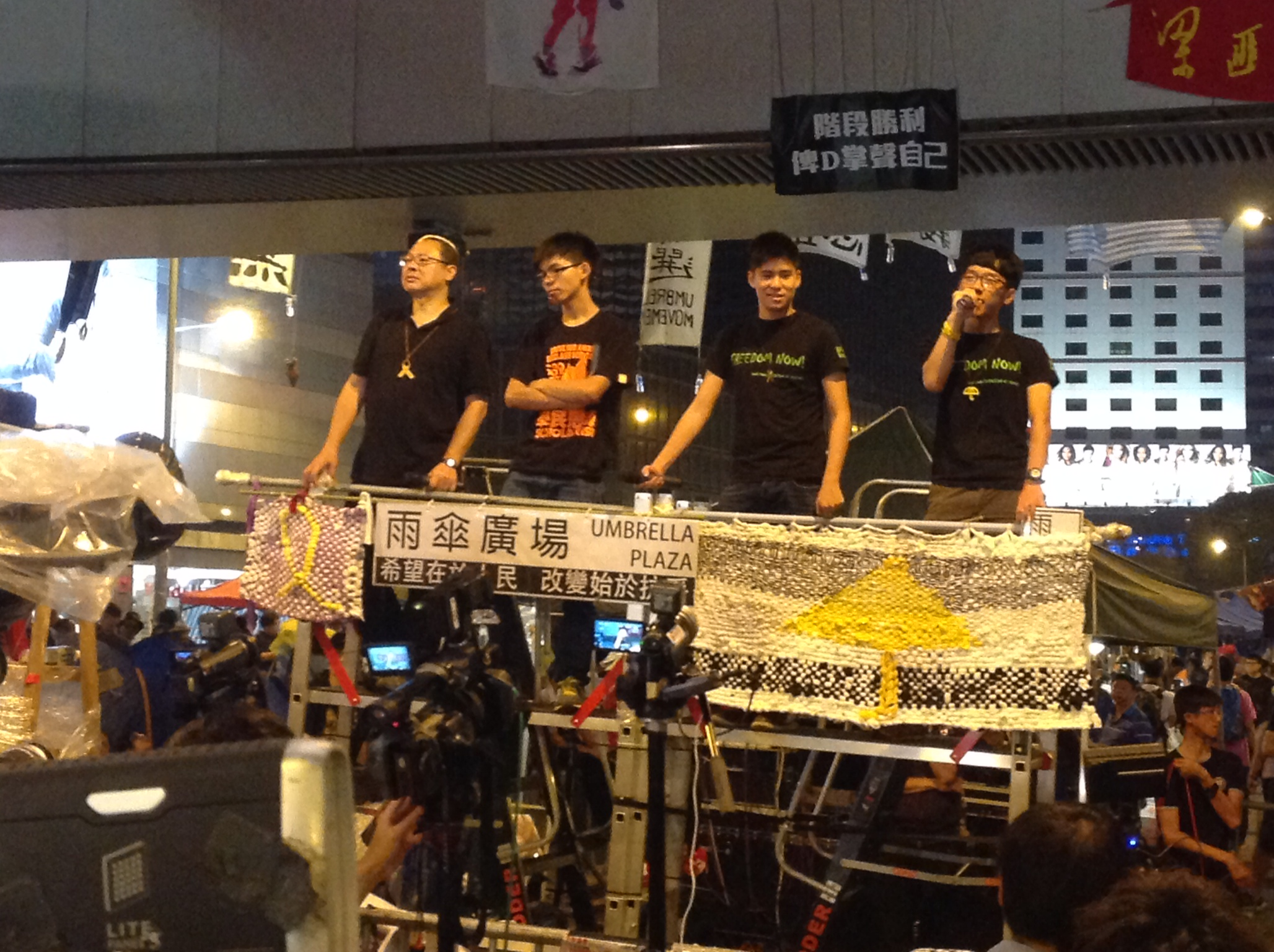
Nathan Law addressed the protesters at the Umbrella Square during the 2014 protests

Law was active in student activism and participated the 2013 Hong Kong dock strike. He joined and became the chairman of the Representative Council of the Lingnan University Students' Union and was the committee member of the Hong Kong Federation of Students (HKFS). He later also became the acting president of the Lingnan University Students' Union (LUSU).

In September 2014, HKFS and Scholarism launched a week-long class boycott against Beijing's decision on Hong Kong electoral reforms. After the strike, the student protesters raided the Civic Square at the Central Government Complex, triggering a 79-day Occupy protest. During the Umbrella Revolution, he rose as one of the student leaders and was one of the five student representatives to hold a talk in a televised open debate with the government representatives led by Chief Secretary for Administration Carrie Lam with HKFS secretary general Alex Chow Yong-kang, vice secretary Lester Shum, general secretary Eason Chung, and another committee member Yvonne Leung in October 2014. He was also one of three student leaders at the heart of the Occupy protests whose Home Return Permits were revoked and were banned from flying to Beijing in an attempt to press their demands for genuine universal suffrage in November 2014. After the protests, he was arrested along with other student leaders.

After the protests, Law succeeded Alex Chow to become the secretary general of Hong Kong Federation of Students from 2015 to 2016. He won with 37 votes from the 53 student representatives from seven tertiary institutions qualified to vote in the annual election in March 2015. His only rival, Jason Szeto Tze-long, secured 14 votes. His secretaryship was highlighted by the disaffiliation crisis that saw localist camp students from member institutions trigger referendums to break away from the HKFS which was accused of making hasty decisions with little transparency during the Umbrella Revolution.

Law campaigned against the referendum at the LU as the acting president of the LUSU which the referendum to break away from HKFS was defeated. However, three student unions of the Hong Kong Polytechnic University, Hong Kong Baptist University and City University of Hong Kong quit the federation in their referendums under Law's secretaryship, following the Hong Kong University Students' Union exit in February 2015.

== Political career ==
=== Legislative Councillor and disqualification ===
In April 2016, Law and other leaders of the Umbrella Revolution including Joshua Wong Chi-fung formed a new political party Demosistō which aimed to fight for the self-determination right of Hong Kong people when the "one country, two systems" expires in 2047, where he became the founding chairman of the new party. He expressed his interest in running in Hong Kong Island in the 2016 Legislative Council election.

Law received 50,818 votes, the second highest among all candidates for the six-seat Hong Kong Island constituency and was elected. After his win, Law claimed that "people are voting (for) a new way and a new future for the democratic movement". Law was elected alongside allies Lau Siu-lai and Eddie Chu. At age 23, Law was the youngest-ever person to become a Hong Kong legislator.

At the inaugural meeting of the Legislative Council, Law and other members used the oath-taking ceremony as a protest platform. Law made an opening statement saying that the oath ceremony had already become the "political tool" of the regime, adding "you can chain me, you can torture me, you can even destroy this body, but you will never imprison my mind". When taking the oath, Law also rose his intonation on the word "國" to the phrase "the Hong Kong Special Administrative Region of the People's Republic of China" (中華人民共和國香港特別行政區), making it sound like a question.

Although Law's oath was validated by the clerk, the oath-taking controversy sparked by Sixtus Leung and Yau Wai-ching of Youngspiration led to the unprecedented legal challenge from Chief executive Leung Chun-ying and Secretary for Justice Rimsky Yuen. On 7 November 2016, the National People's Congress Standing Committee interpreted the Article 104 of the Basic Law of Hong Kong, standardising the manners of the oath-taking when taking public office. As a result, the duo was disqualified by the court. Subsequently, the government launched a second legal action against Law and three other pro-democracy legislators, Lau Siu-lai, Yiu Chung-yim and Leung Kwok-hung, which resulted in their disqualifications from the Legislative Council on 14 July 2017.

=== Imprisonment ===
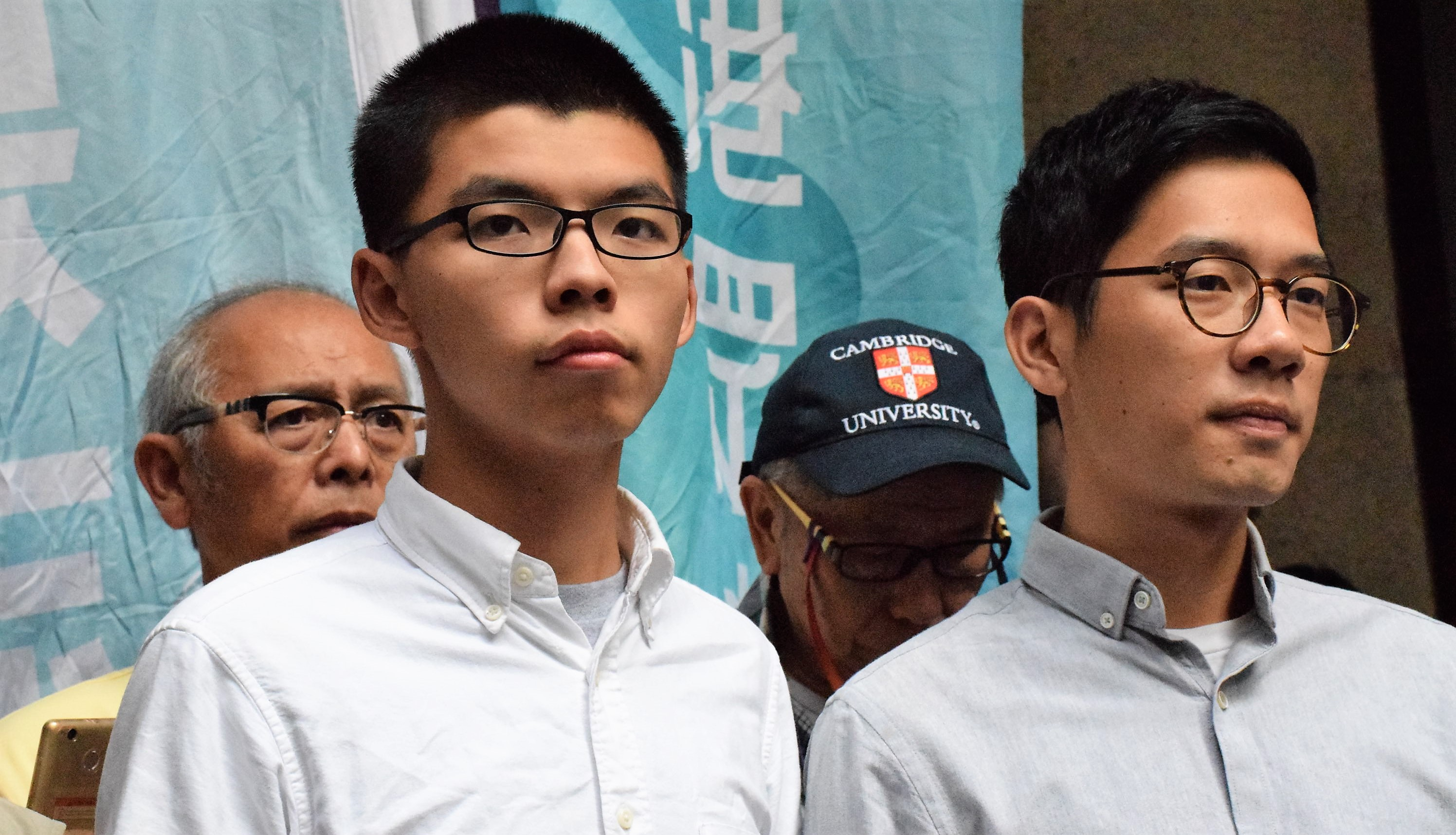
(L to R) Joshua Wong and Nathan Law freed on bail outside the Court of Final Appeal, 24 October 2017

Law, along with two other prominent Hong Kong pro-democracy student leaders Joshua Wong and Alex Chow, were jailed for six to eight months on 17 August 2017 for storming the Civic Square in 2014. The sentence, if held, would also have "halted their budding political careers", as they are barred from running for public office for five years. Law was sent to the medium-security Tong Fuk Correctional Institution on Lantau Island.

On 24 October 2017, Nathan Law and Joshua Wong were granted bail by Hong Kong's chief justice, Geoffrey Ma, while Alex Chow did not appeal for bail and continued serving his seven-month jail term. Under their bail conditions, Law and Wong had to live in their Hong Kong home addresses and had to report weekly to police until 7 November 2017, when the trio appeals over their jail terms have set to be heard. Law stepped out of the Court of Final Appeal doors with his girlfriend, Tiffany Yuen. Later Law and Wong participated in a Hong Kong radio program where Nathan Law said one of his supporters named their son — who was born after the Umbrella Revolution — after the Chinese word for "aspiration" so as to never forget the democratic aspirations of Hong Kong.

On 6 February 2018, the Court of Final Appeal upheld the conviction of the trio, affirming the lower court's view of the Civic Square protests as violent. However, it overturned the imprisonment sentence imposed by the Court of Appeal, on the grounds the term had applied a new standard "retrospectively".

=== Recognition ===
On 1 February 2018, a bipartisan group of US lawmakers, led by Congressional-Executive Commission on China (CECC) Chair US Senator Marco Rubio and co-chair US Representative Chris Smith announced they had nominated Joshua Wong, Law, Alex Chow and the entire Umbrella Movement for the 2018 Nobel Peace Prize, for "their peaceful efforts to bring political reform and protect the autonomy and freedoms guaranteed Hong Kong in the Sino-British Joint Declaration".

Law was included in Time magazine's 100 Most Influential People of 2020 and was the winner of the reader's poll. In the list Chris Patten, the last British governor of Hong Kong, described him as "a typically brave representative of a generation whose spirit the Communist Party wants to stamp out."

== Exile ==
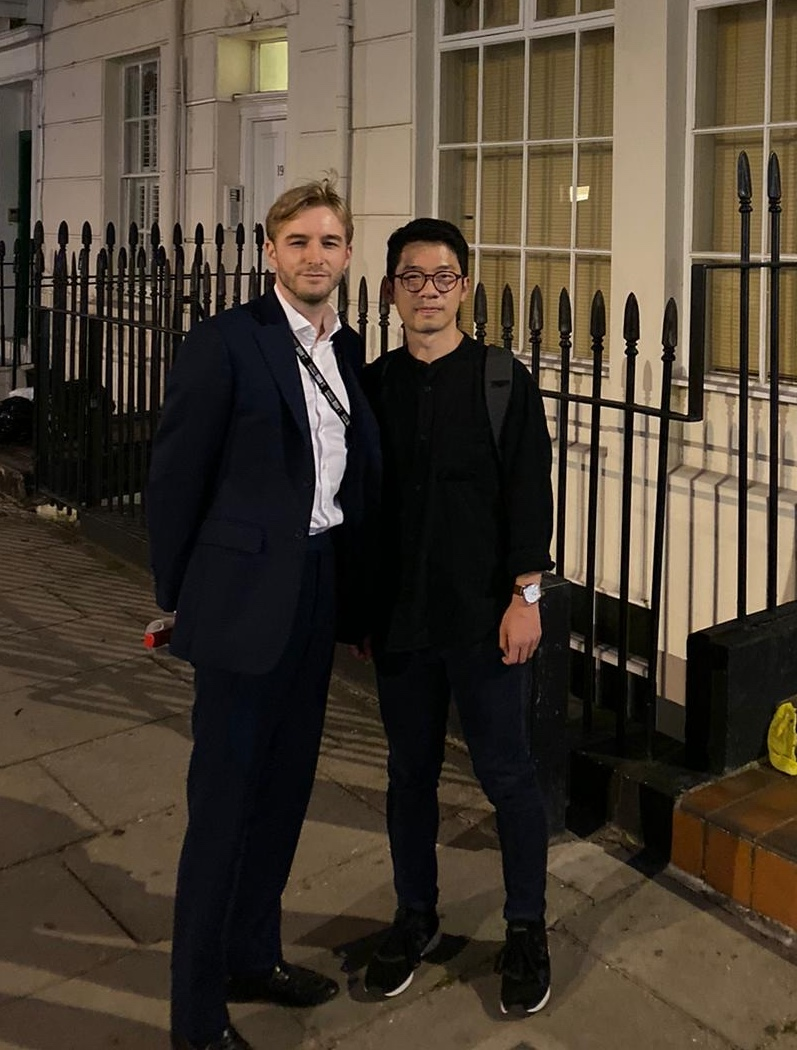
Law with democracy activist Luke de Pulford in London, shortly after beginning self-exile

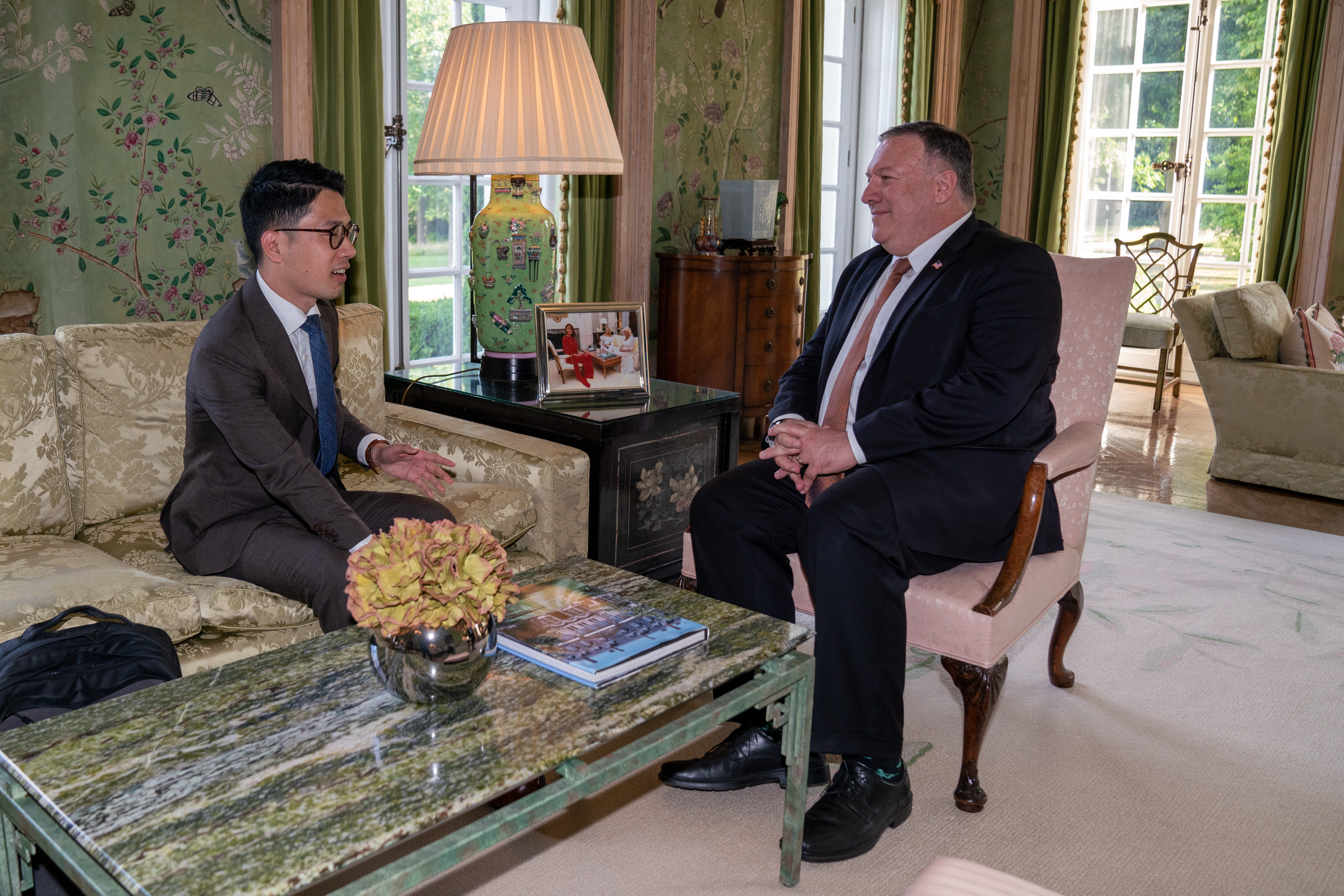
Nathan Law met with U.S. Secretary of State Mike Pompeo in London, July 2020

Hours after the promulgation of the new security law in Hong Kong enacted by Beijing on 30 June 2020, Nathan Law and the other leaders of Demosistō resigned from their offices and the party disbanded. On 2 July, he announced that he had left Hong Kong due to safety concerns. In his statement he encouraged the international community to continue advocating for the Hong Kong protesters, and said that he did not know when he would return to Hong Kong. He dropped out from the pro-democracy primaries and days later announced he was in London. Law met with US secretary of state Mike Pompeo during his visit to the United Kingdom in the same month, discussing the situation in Hong Kong, especially the possibility of Beijing's "meddling" in upcoming legislative elections, as well as human rights in Tibet and Xinjiang.

On 3 July 2020, he testified before US Congress via video-conference (due to COVID-19 travel restriction) where he repeated his call for actions to be taken against Hong Kong and mainland China for enacting a national security law for Hong Kong, an action which violates the said law. Chinese state media reported on 1 August that an arrest warrant had been issued against him by Hong Kong police, which was repeated by Western media but remained unconfirmed by Hong Kong police. On 16 October 2020, another arrest warrant was issued against him for failing to appear in court due to the banned Tiananmen vigil.

On 7 April 2021, Law announced on Twitter that he has been granted asylum in the UK. On 9 April 2021, Chinese Foreign Ministry spokesman Zhao Lijian criticized the UK for allegedly "harbouring a criminal suspect wanted by the Hong Kong police". Zhao further elaborated that the move by the UK was a "gross interference in Hong Kong’s judicial affairs and a breach of international law and basic norms governing international relations."

On 10 December 2021, the Hong Kong government released a statement which claimed that Law, accused in the statement of being "defamatory" and "slandering", had skipped bail. They have called him a “useful idiot of the Americans”. The same month, in response to enquiries by Hong Kong Free Press about the basis for the statement regarding bail, the Information Services Department said a summons had been issued to Law – which according to Hong Kong Free Press never occurred – while the Department of Justice said it refused to comment on individual cases.

On 11 July 2023, after the Hong Kong police issued a wanted list of eight overseas activists that included Law, his parents and brother in Hong Kong were taken by police for questioning. According to local news reports, they were released the same day.

On 12 June 2024, the Hong Kong government revoked Law's passport, exercising powers that it had been granted under the Safeguarding National Security Ordinance.

In 2025, Law appeared on the podcast Targeted.

=== 2025 denial of entry into Singapore ===
On 27 September 2025, Law travelled to Singapore from San Francisco to attend an undisclosed, "closed-door, invitation-only" event. Singapore has an extradition treaty with Hong Kong. Holding a British–issued Refugee Travel Document, Law had been granted a visa that would have allowed for a "one-time entry for a few days". Singapore's Ministry of Home Affairs (MHA) said that his entry in Singapore "would not be in Singapore's national interests" and emphasised that all visa holders remain subject to additional checks upon arrival. He was put on the earliest flight back to San Francisco.

== Bibliography ==
- Law, Nathan; Fowler, Evan: Freedom: How we lose it and how we fight back (2021), Random House, ISBN 9781473597051
- Law, Nathan: When the wind blows: the struggle for freedom in Hong Kong (2024, in Traditional Chinese), Heiti wenhua chuanbanshe, Taiwan, ISBN 9786267263990

== See also ==
- United States sanctions against China
- List of people granted asylum

== Notes ==
Political offices
Preceded by Alex Chow	Secretary General of Hong Kong Federation of Students; 2015–2016	Succeeded by Chan Man-hei
Party political offices
New political party	Chairman of Demosistō; 2016–2018	Succeeded by Ivan Lam
Legislative Council of Hong Kong
Preceded by Jasper Tsang	Member of Legislative Council; Representative for Hong Kong Island; 2016–2017	Succeeded by Au Nok-hin
