= Alex Chow =

Hong Kong pro-democracy activist (born 1990)

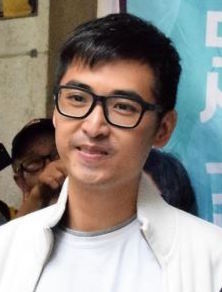
- Chow on grant of bail, 7 October 2017
- Born: Alex Chow Wing-hong; 18 August 1990 (age 36)
- Education: University of Hong Kong (BA); London School of Economics (MSc); University of California, Berkeley
- Occupation: Social activist

Alex Chow Wing Hong
- Chinese: 周永康
Transcriptions
Standard Mandarin
- Hanyu Pinyin: Zhōu Yǒngkāng
Yue: Cantonese
- Jyutping: zau1 wing5 hong1
- Sidney Lau: Jau^{1} Wing^{5} Hong^{1}

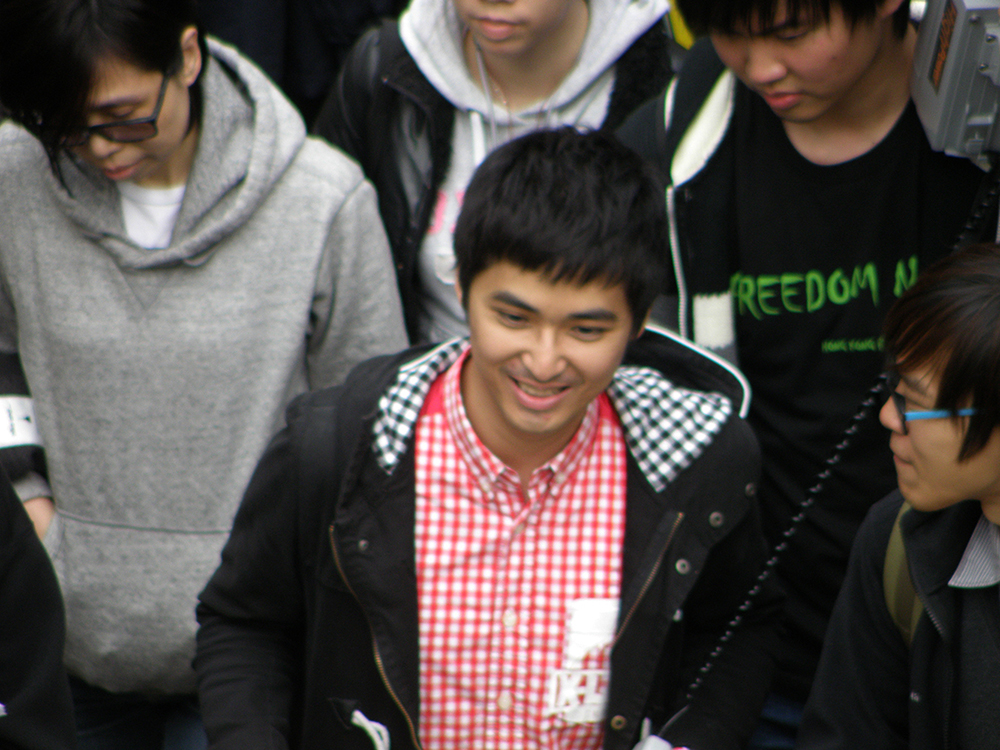
Alex Chow in February 2015

Alex Chow Yong-kang (Chinese: 周永康; Sidney Lau: Jau^{¹} Wing^{⁵} Hong^{¹}; born 18 August 1990) is a social activist from Hong Kong and current doctoral candidate in geography at the University of California, Berkeley. He is a former secretary-general of the Hong Kong Federation of Students and a former Vice-President (External) of the Hong Kong University Students' Union.

== Occupy Central ==
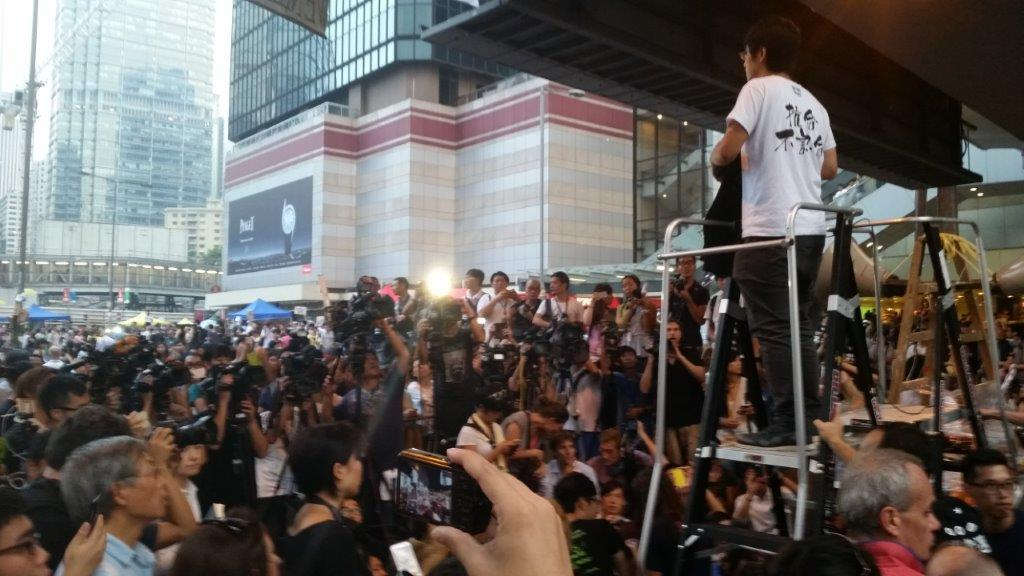
Alex Chow addresses Occupy Central Crowd, 2 October 2014 17:54

Chow was one of the main organisers of the Occupy Central campaign. On 1 July 2014, following an annual pro-democracy rally, he organised a sit-in on Chater Road in central Hong Kong which was forcibly dispersed by police. 511 people were arrested. He was quoted as saying at the time that "It’s not enough to repeat the march and the assembly every year. We have to upgrade it to a civil disobedience movement." He later wrote that "In the past 30 years, the democracy movement has been too slow and too painstaking. The power of civil disobedience lies … in the blood and tears of everyone who is behind the struggle."

== Umbrella Movement ==
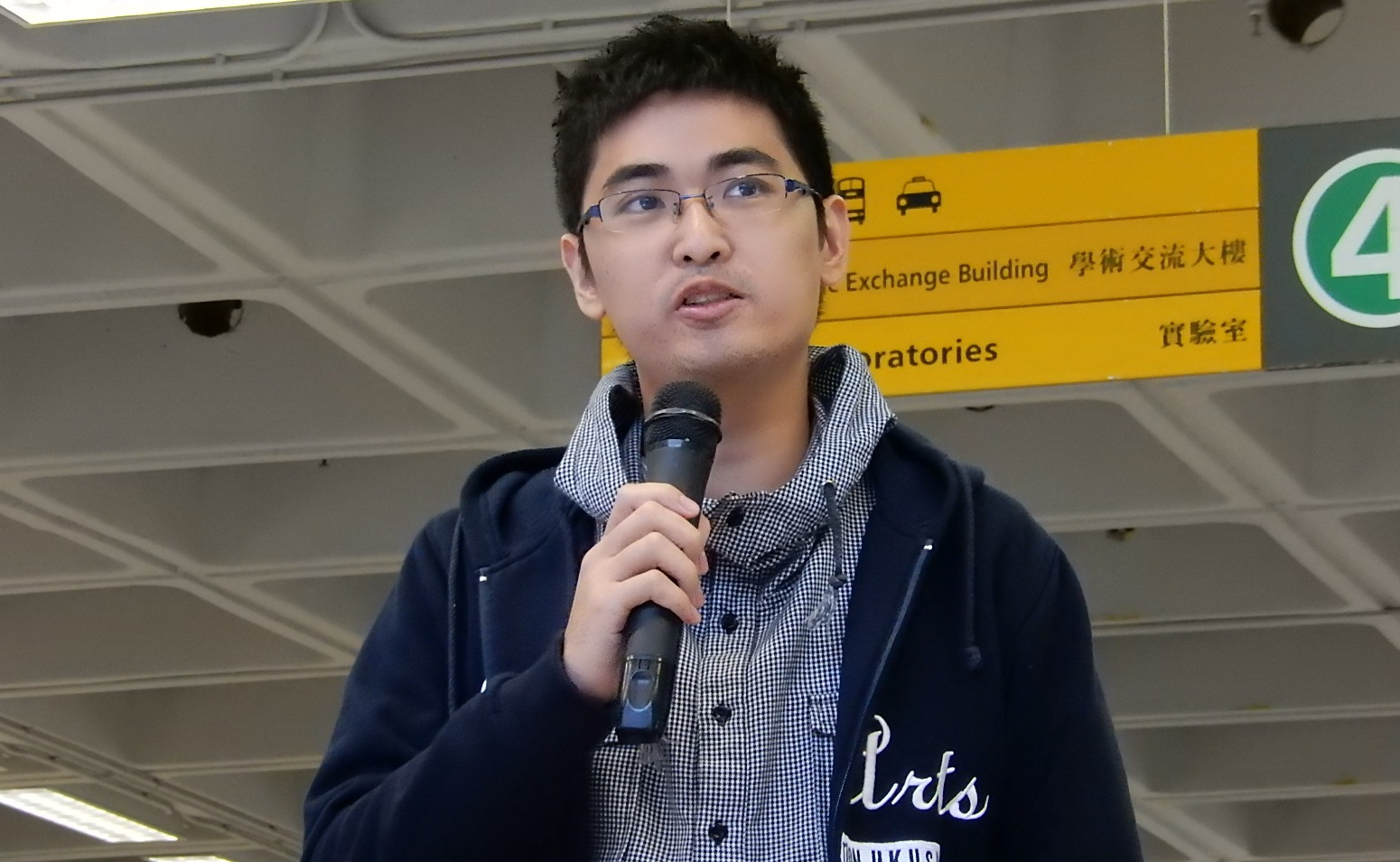
Alex Chow at a forum

In the early stages of the Umbrella Movement, he was an influential organiser and speaker. He was reported as announcing to protesters, "This is not a student movement; this is a Hong Kongers' movement"; he told The New York Times that "residents may occupy various government departments". On 5 October, when the Federation of Students agreed to enter into dialogue with the government, Chow announced that the talks would be called off if attempts were made to forcefully remove protesters. In a speech at the main protest camp, he explained, "A dialogue is not a compromise. We will start arranging talks with the government, because we understand that there are people in both the government and here who want to solve society’s problems. We will not back down."

Having attempted and failed to organise meetings with officials through local channels, Chow and two other students were prevented from travelling to China to petition mainland government officials when they attempted to leave on 15 November. The group, consisting of Chow, Nathan Law and Eason Chung, learned from airline officials that mainland authorities had revoked their Home Return Permits, effectively banning them from boarding the flight for Beijing.

Chow and two other prominent Hong Kong pro-democracy student leaders, Nathan Law and Joshua Wong, were convicted on 21 July 2016 of unlawful assembly (incitement in Chow's case) at the Civic Square, Central Government Complex at Tamar, during a protest that triggered the 79-day Occupy sit-ins of 2014. He was initially sentenced to three weeks of imprisonment over a suspended sentence on 15 August. A year later, his term was increased to seven months following an appeal to the High Court by the government. The appeal by the government drew condemnation from overseas politicians and rights campaigners, who called the three "political prisoners". Chris Patten, former governor of Hong Kong, said their names would be remembered "long after nobody can remember who I was, and perhaps nobody can remember who President Xi Jinping was". The conviction, if not overturned on appeal, would result in Chow's disqualification from standing for election to the Legislative Council until July 2021.

In February 2018, Chow, Law and Wong won an appeal at the Court of Final Appeal to overturn their jail sentences, after a five-judge panel said those sentences applied a new standard "retroactively". The trio was previously given lighter sentences, with Wong and Law completing community service and Chow receiving a suspended prison term. Human rights researcher Maya Wang said the Hong Kong government used this case to see how far it could go in pursuing political prosecutions and "redoubled efforts to weaken pro-democracy voices", adding that "no one should be prosecuted for a peaceful protest".

At the time of Chow's imprisonment, the London School of Economics, at which Chow had been studying, reached out to both the UK and the Hong Kong government to seek reassurances over Chow's well-being after a petition gathered close to 5,000 signatures. Chow was about to go to the University of California, Berkeley to start a doctoral program when he was unexpectedly imprisoned in August 2016. Chow began a master's degree at the London School of Economics in 2016, followed by a doctorate at the University of California, Berkeley.

Political offices
Preceded by Eddie Chan	Secretary General of Hong Kong Federation of Students; 2014–2015	Succeeded by Nathan Law
