= Timeline of reactions to the 2020 Hong Kong national security law (December 2020) =

December events of the 2019-2020 pro-democracy demonstrations in Hong Kong

Timeline of the 2019–2020 Hong Kong protests
2019			March–June				July	August	September	October	November	December
2020	January	February	March	April	May	June	July	August	September	October	November	December
2021	January	February	March	April	May	June	July	August	September–November			December

Few protests took place in December 2020 and there was no large-scale demonstrations in threat of the national security law. The imprisonment of Joshua Wong, Agnes Chow and Ivan Lam on 2 December aroused attention of the International community.

A Hong Kong media tycoon, Jimmy Lai, was charged with an offence under national security law. The charge was condemned by international community.

== 1 December ==
=== Arson attack on Police Sports and Recreation Club ===
At about 1 am, nine petrol bombs were thrown at the open-air parking lot of the Police Sports and Recreation Club, burning the front of a truck. Police said that they had received a report of three men hurling the bombs. Police later seized a man nearby on Shek Kip Mei Street who carried pepper spray. He was arrested for a while and finally stated that had nothing to do with the case. On the 18 December, after checking a large number of CCTV footages, the police arrested three teenagers between the ages of 16 and 23 in Tai Wai, Kwai Chung and Tsim Sha Tsui, and seized raw materials for making petrol bombs on the rooftop of the three-nil building in Mong Kok. Three people were to be charged with arson and were scheduled to appear in West Kowloon Magistrates' Court on the next day.

== 2 December ==
=== HKBU student council president arrested ===
According to a Facebook post by the Hong Kong Baptist University student union, its acting president Keith Fong was arrested by more than 20 police officers at 7 am and detained at Sha Tin Police Station on suspicion of perverting the course of justice, possession of offensive weapons, and resisting arrest, all in relation to his previous arrest in August 2019 during the protests. He was granted bail of HK$10,000. The case was to be brought to court on 8 December.

=== Sentencing of Joshua Wong, Agnes Chow, and Ivan Lam ===
On 2 December, three former Demosisto members were sentenced for organizing and participating in a protest at Wan Chai Police Headquarters on 21 June 2019. The West Kowloon Magistrate Courts sentenced Joshua Wong, Agnes Chow, and Ivan Lam respectively to imprisonment of 13 and a half months, 10 months, and 7 months.

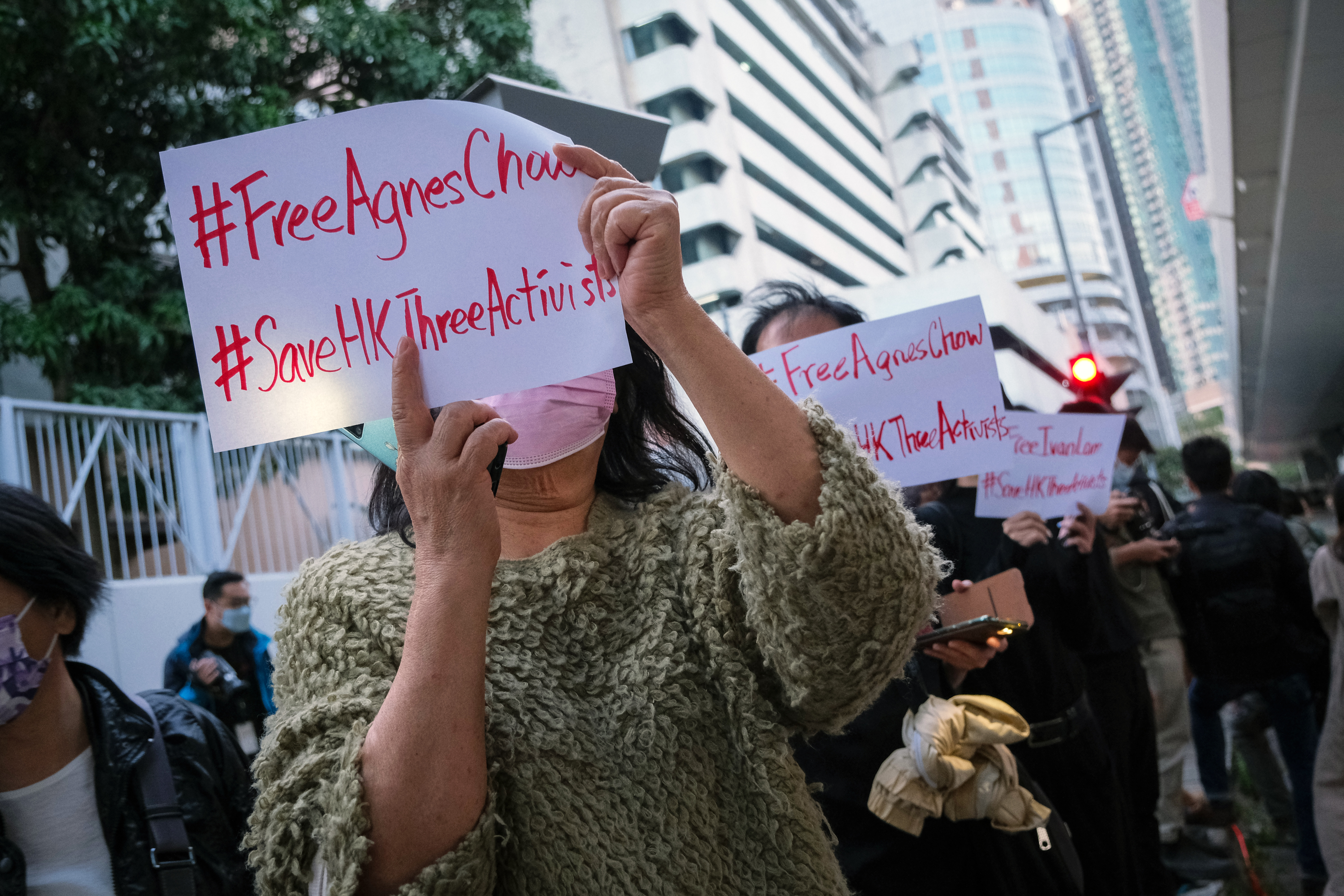
Some citizens raised the '#SaveHKThreeActivists' slogan supporting Agnes Chow.

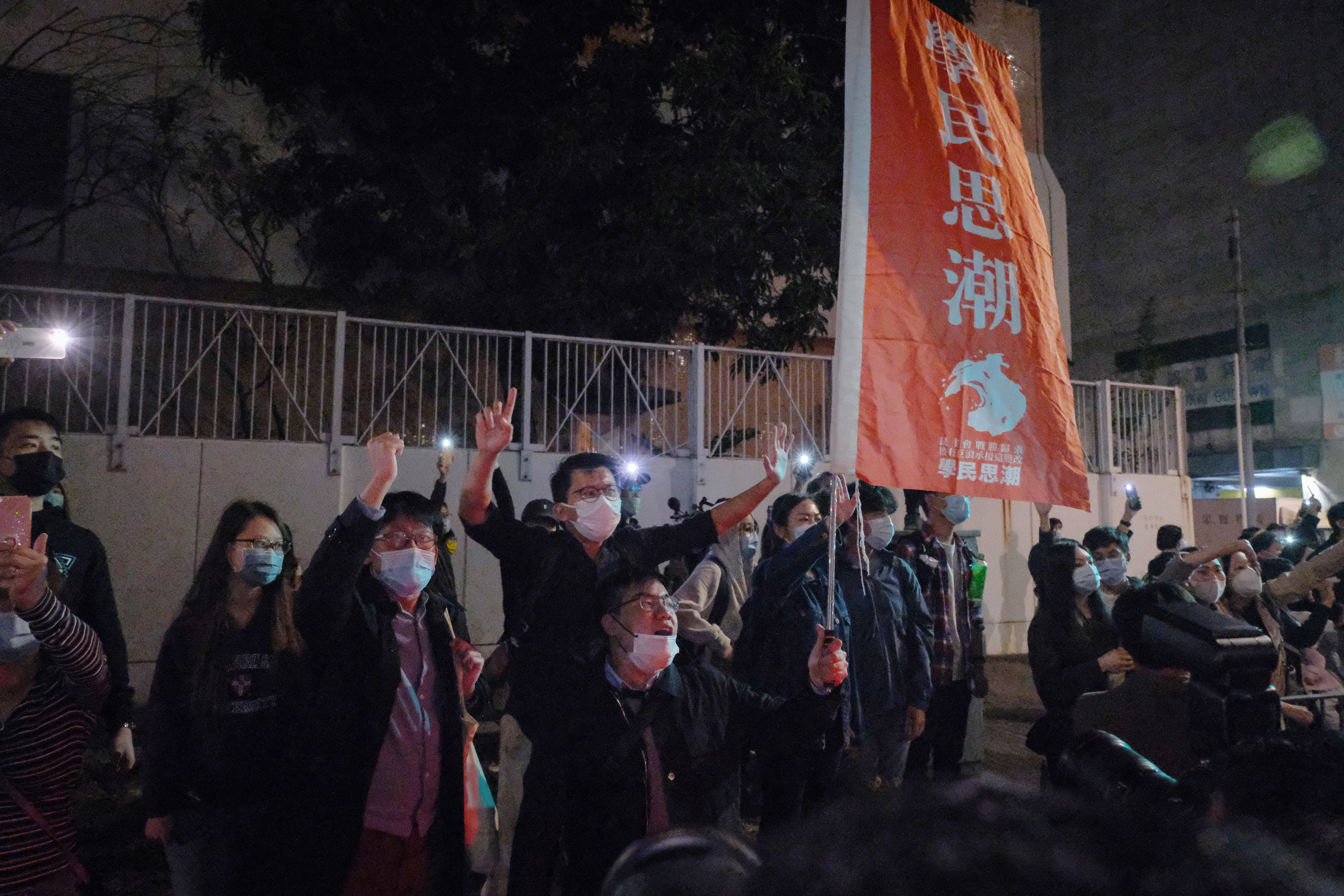
Former members of Scholarism stand in solidarity at the intersection and raise a flag.

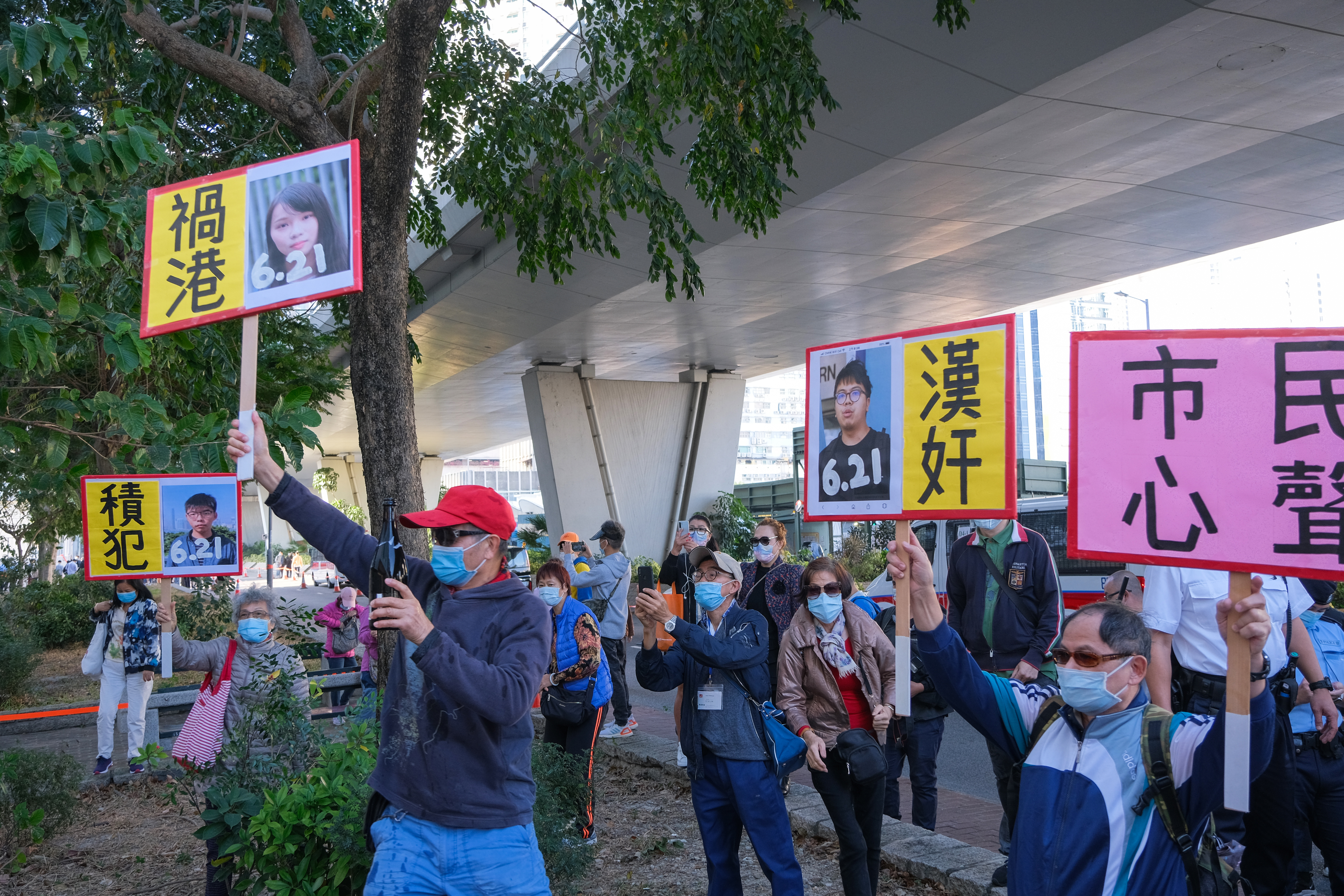
Pro-Beijing protesters outside court, with placards labeling Agnes Chow as harming Hong Kong and Ivan Lam as a traitor.

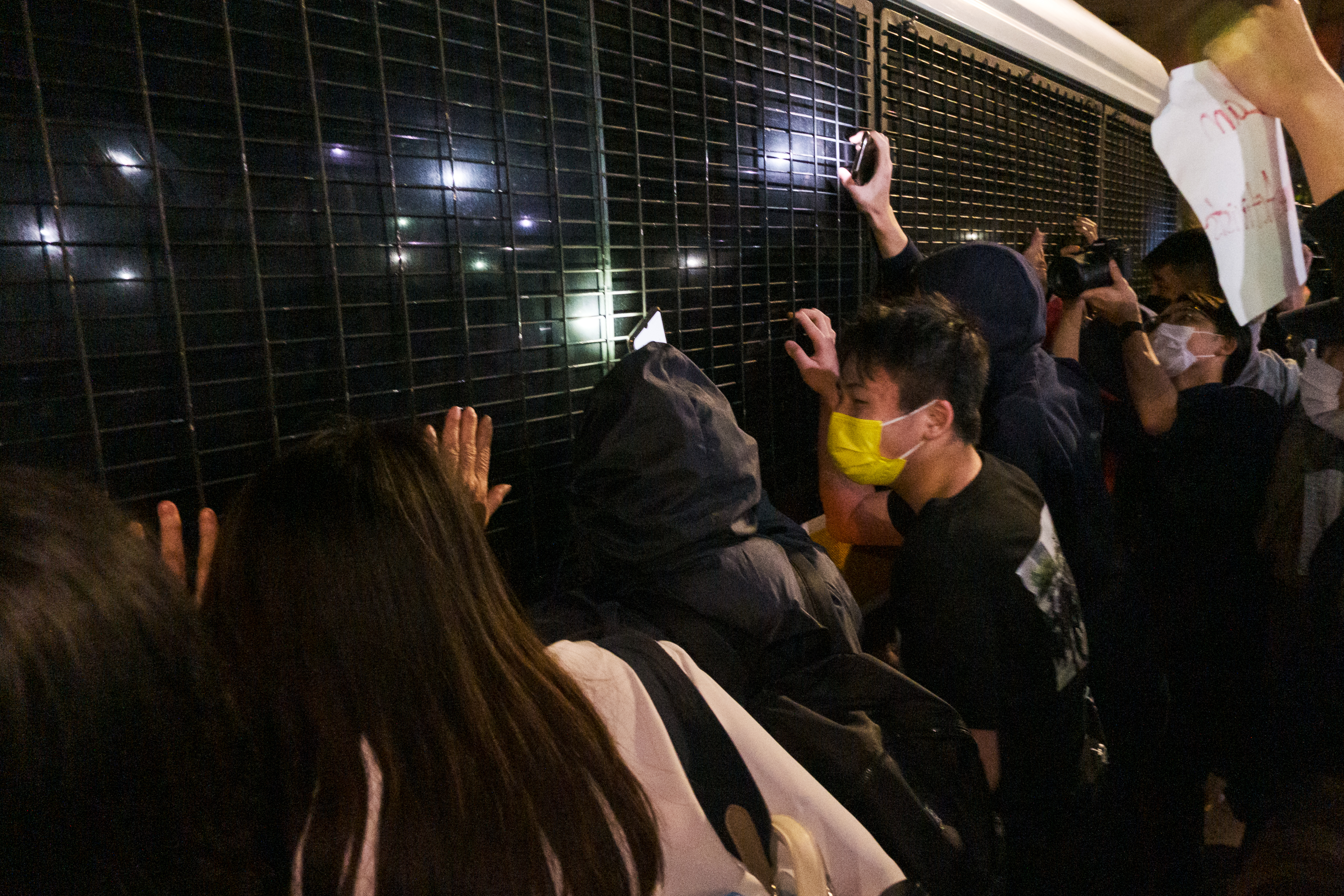
Supporters slapping and besieging the prison van while holding mobile phone flashlights

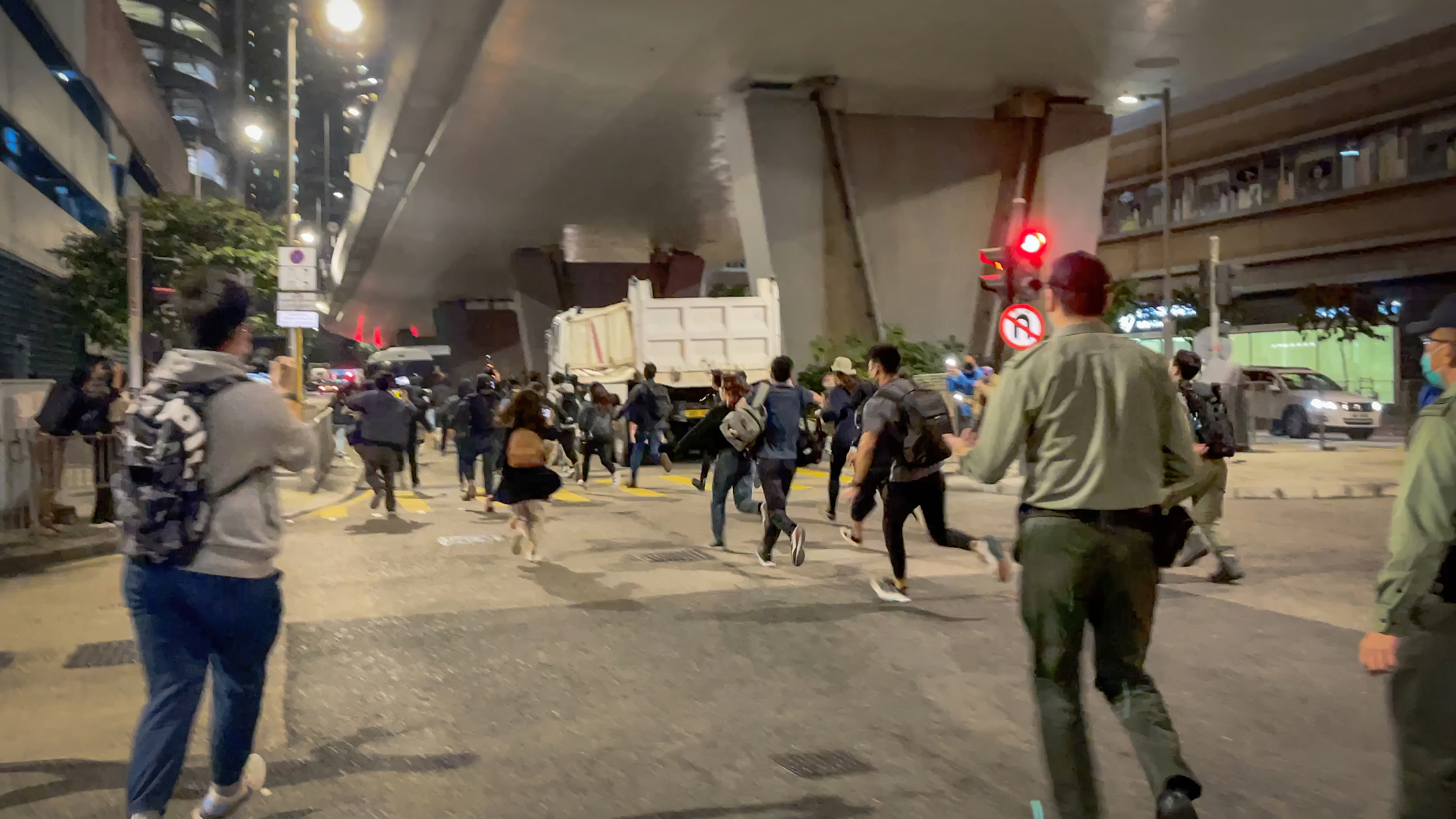
Supporters chasing the prison van outside West Kowloon Magistrates' Court

=== German human rights report criticizes China ===
German Ministry of Foreign Affairs released its biennial human rights report on 2 December. In its chapter on China, the report mentioned that the introduction of the Hong Kong national security law had made the situation worse, and it would facilitate the Chinese security agencies to crack down on Hong Kong's civil society, opposition figures and independent media, eroding the one country, two systems principle meant to ensure a high degree of autonomy in Hong Kong.

== 3 December ==
=== Ted Hui went into exile ===
Former Democratic Party member of the Legislative Council Ted Hui issued a statement on Facebook at about 8 pm, he officially announced that he would temporarily leave Hong Kong in exile and withdraw from the Democratic Party. Both the Democratic Party and Katarina Ammitzbøll, the Danish politician who had helped Hui obtain the invitation to the Denmark conference which he used as a pretext to leave Hong Kong, expressed their belief that he would be moving to the United Kingdom.

== 5 December ==
=== Ted Hui in London ===
LegCo member Ted Hui was reported to have arrived at London Heathrow Airport in the UK. He said in an interview that he did not want to discuss details at the moment. He refused to disclose the whereabouts of his family, and did not want to talk more about whether to stay in the UK and what travel documents he used. A spokesperson for the Security Bureau issued a solemn statement, strongly condemning any fugitives who blatantly abandon security and absconded, describing it as "a shameful act of absconding in fear of crime." The police also strongly condemned the relevant actions and stated that they would trace the whereabouts of the fugitive suspect through various channels in accordance with the law and arrest him.

== 7 December ==
=== CUHK protesters arrested ===
The National Security Department of the Hong Kong Police Force took over the investigation of the demonstration at Chinese University of Hong Kong the previous month and arrested eight people, aged between 16 and 34, including Kwun Tong District Councillor Eason Chan Yik-shun and research assistant Arthur Yeung Tsz-chun, both reportedly CUHK graduates, and Sai Kung District Council Member Isaac Lee Ka-yui. The police stated that the eight were suspected of participating in an unauthorized assembly, and three of them were suspected of inciting secession.

=== Bank accounts of Ted Hui are frozen ===
After the former LegCo member, Ted Hui, announced his exile, the bank accounts of him and his family were frozen. They were once unfrozen, but they were frozen again on 7 December. HSBC said it would not comment on individual cases, but said that the relevant facts were distorted and not completely frozen, and that the parents' accounts were not affected. Hui later pointed out on Facebook that the account was completely frozen, and asked HSBC to respond positively and clarify which aspect was distorted and fully disclosed the incident. He said the incident affected the confidence of all HSBC customers in Hong Kong and the world.

Senior Superintendent of the National Security Department of the Hong Kong Police, Li Kwai-wah, did not call the name to respond to Hui's account being frozen, saying that the social networking site of the person concerned has been suspected of colluding with foreign forces, such as 'widening the international front in Hong Kong.'

In the evening, Hui stated on Facebook that the police accusations of his embezzling HK$850,000 in crowdfunding was purely discrediting, and disclosed the relevant crowdfunding records. He urged the police to produce objective evidence and criticized the police for suppressing and discrediting dissidents.

=== U.S. sanctions 14 vice chairmen of the National People's Congress ===
Reuters quoted news reports that in response to the four Hong Kong pro-democracy legislators having been expelled by the local government with authority granted by the National People's Congress, the United States was preparing to sanction 14 NPC officials and Chinese officials. The initial news stated that Hong Kong officials were likely to be included. Those finally sanctioned were the 14 NPC vice chairpersons Cai Dafeng, Cao Jianming, Chen Zhu, Baima Chilin, Ding Zhongli, Hao Mingjin, Arken Imirbaki, Ji Bingxuan, Shen Yueyue, Wan Exiang, Wang Chen, Wang Dongming, Wu Weihua, and Zhang Chunxian. The sanctioned individuals, together with their family members, were banned from traveling to the U.S., any of their assets there were frozen, and U.S. companies and individuals were banned from dealing with them. U.S. Secretary of State Mike Pompeo issued a statement on the same day, accusing Beijing of continuously undermining Hong Kong's democratic procedures, causing the Hong Kong Legislative Council to exist in name only and degenerate into a rubber stamp that no longer had any meaningful opposition forces.

=== U.S. House of Representatives passes the Hong Kong People's Freedom and Choice Act ===
U.S. House of Representatives passed the Hong Kong People's Freedom and Choice Act without any objection. The bill will be submitted to the Senate for deliberation and will be submitted to the President for signature after a vote by the Senate.

== 8 December ==
=== Pan-democrats arrested ===
In the morning, the police came to arrest at least eight members of the pro-democracy camp. The arrested persons included Democratic Party chairman Wu Chi-wai, vice chairman of League of Social Democrats Leung Kwok-hung, Member Deng Shili, Civil Human Rights Front convener Figo Chan, former LegCo member Eddie Chu, Eastern district councillor Tsang Kin-shing, Lancelot Chan, and Chui Chi-kin. According to reports, the arrest was related to the unlawful assembly outside the Court of Final Appeal and the 1 July parade on 30 June 2020. They were suspected of inciting others to knowingly participate in an unauthorized assembly, organizing unlawful assembly and taking part in an unlawful assembly. They will appear at West Kowloon Magistrates' Court on 17 December.

=== Church raided and has its bank accounts frozen ===
Good Neighborhood North District, which had organized the Guardian Action in the anti-extradition bill protest, stated that the HSBC bank accounts of the church and the pastor and preacher Ray Chan and his wife were frozen. In the evening, the police arrested a former female director and a former female employee of the church, suspected of concealing the receipt of 18 million yuan in donations and money laundering in the crowdfunding activities in the name of religion and supporting youth, which was higher than the amount raised by the church more than HK$8.9 million. The police have asked HSBC to freeze the five bank accounts involved in the case, involving a total of HK$25 million. The police also stated that the group directors and company secretaries involved in the case had left Hong Kong in mid-October this year.

=== China condemns US for passing Hong Kong People's Freedom and Choice Act by House of Representatives ===
The Hong Kong and Macau Affairs Office of the State Council issued a statement condemning the US sanctions against 14 vice-chairmen of the Standing Committee of the National People's Congress. It criticized the US sanctions for completely violating international law and basic norms of international relations, and stated they were "hysterical political bullying". It further stated that the United States itself had established an airtight legal system for safeguarding national security, wantonly slandering, grossly interfering, and savagely suppressing China's legitimate actions in safeguarding national security and the constitutional order of the SAR, describing it as "blatant double standards and robber logic".

The Hong Kong Liaison Office strongly condemned the US sanctions, calling it a political bullying that seriously violated international law and the basic norms of international relations. It stated that China would never fear any arbitrary hegemony, and will never tolerate the rudeness of the United States in Hong Kong affairs and China's internal affairs. It stated that intervention will never shake the firm determination to safeguard national sovereignty, security and development interests.

The Commissioner's Office of the Ministry of Foreign Affairs in Hong Kong also expressed its strong indignation about the US sanctions.

=== US diplomat summoned by Beijing ===
Chinese Vice Foreign Minister Zheng Zeguang summoned Robert W. Forden, the Chargé d'affaires of the US Embassy in China, to lodge a solemn protest against the US sanctions against the vice chairmen of the National People's Congress. Zheng stated that the US sanctions severely violated the basic norms of international relations, seriously interfered in China's internal affairs, severely undermined China-US relations, were arbitrarily unreasonable, and were bad in nature. China expressed its strong indignation and strongly condemned the action.

== 9 December ==
=== Nathan Law meets British politicians ===
UK Home Secretary Priti Patel met with former Demosistō member Nathan Law who had fled to London, and Beatrice Li, the younger sister of Hong Kong Story member Andy Li, who was detained in Shenzhen after failing to escape to Taiwan. She pointed out that the United Kingdom would stand shoulder to shoulder with Hong Kong people and abide by fulfill the promise and defend the freedom of Hong Kong people. Hong Kong government subsequently issued a statement accusing the British side that when signing the Sino-British Joint Declaration, it made a clear promise not to grant Hong Kong citizens who hold British National (Overseas) passports the right of abode in the UK. It would be disregarding history to violate the facts and international obligations.

== 11 December ==
=== Jimmy Lai charged under national security law ===
National Security Department of the Hong Kong Police Force officially charged Jimmy Lai, the founder of Next Digital for colluding with foreign forces, becoming the first person to be charged with this crime after the Hong Kong national security law took effect. The chairman of Civic Party and Senior Counsel Alan Leong estimated that the police believed that Lai had discussed the situation in Hong Kong with foreign politicians on Twitter earlier, or mentioned that he called for foreign support for Hong Kong during interviews by foreign media. The case was brought to the West Kowloon Magistrate Courts on 12 December.

In addition, Tony Chung, a former convener of Studentlocalism who was remanded in custody for violating the national security law, was convicted for desecrating Chinese national flag in the demonstration area of the Legislative Council on 14 May 2019. The national flag, he denied the two crimes of insulting the national flag and illegal assembly. The case was brought to the Eastern Magistrate Courts on 11 December. Magistrate Peony Wong Nga-yan alleged that he had taken the initiative to grab the five-star red flag and then broke the flagpole, and then tossed the flag in mid-air as a deliberate insult. He was found guilty of two counts. The court adjourned the case until 29 December for sentencing, and the defendant must continue to be remanded in custody.

=== Baggio Leung went into exile ===
Baggio Leung, who was disqualified as a LegCo member in 2016, said through the media and overseas Hong Kong people's organization Haven Assistance that he left Hong Kong on 30 November and arrived in the United States the next day. He appeared in Washington, D.C. and applied for asylum. Radio Free Asia’s YouTube channel uploaded an interview with Leung, stating that he severed all ties with his family. At the end of September, after he was released from prison, he was found being followed and worried about his own safety, so he decided to leave Hong Kong. He hopes that the White House can provide a lifeboat plan to Hong Kong residents who were born after 1997 and do not have a British National (Overseas) passport.

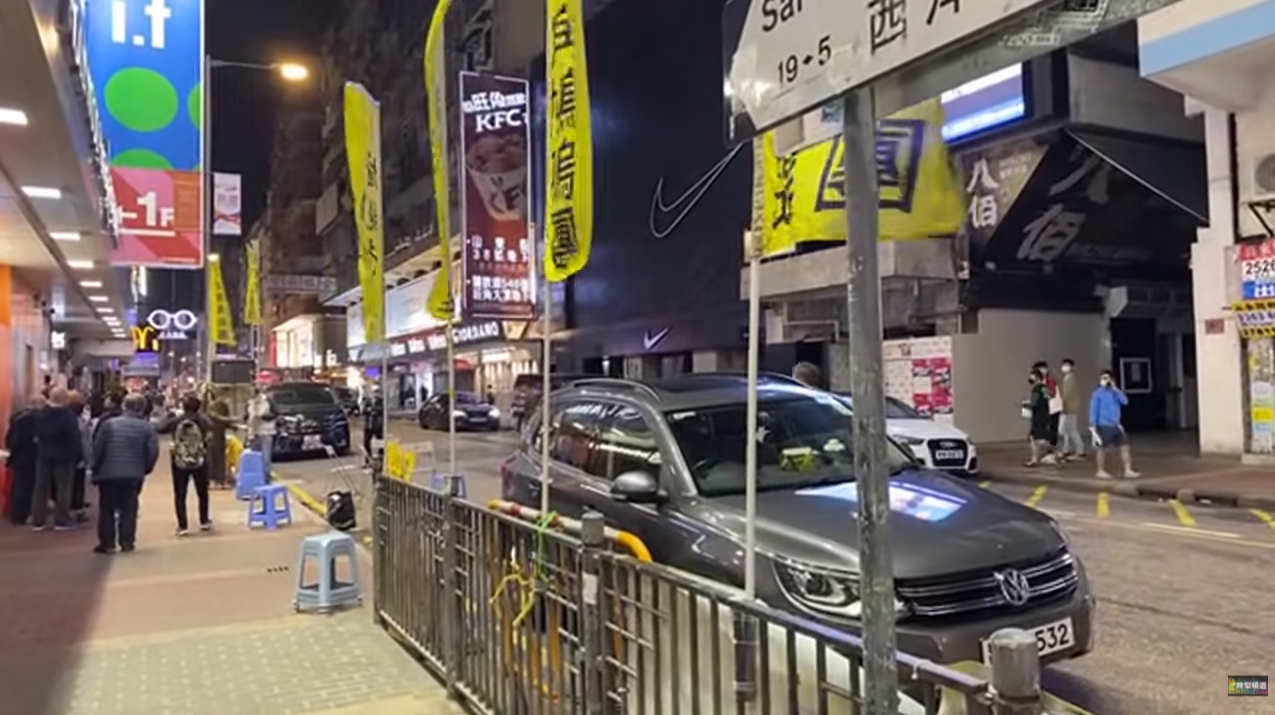
Police ticket charged at Sai Yeung Choi South Street, Mong Kok

=== Police fined 17 people for violating gathering restrictions ===
The fixed fines for the gathering restriction order and mask order have been increased from HK$2,000 to HK$5,000. At 8 pm, the police received a report saying that someone had gathered outside Sai Yeung Choi Street in Mong Kok without wearing a mask. After the police arrived at the scene, they asked the people present to stop gathering and leave immediately. However, they were ignored. In the end, 13 men and 2 women were involved in breaching the gathering restriction order, aged between 45 and 76, and issued fixed penalty notices to them. Two other men were accused of not wearing masks and were charged. And a 73-year-old man who was wanted was taken away by the police.

== 12 December ==
=== Pro-independence activist Andy Chan acquitted ===
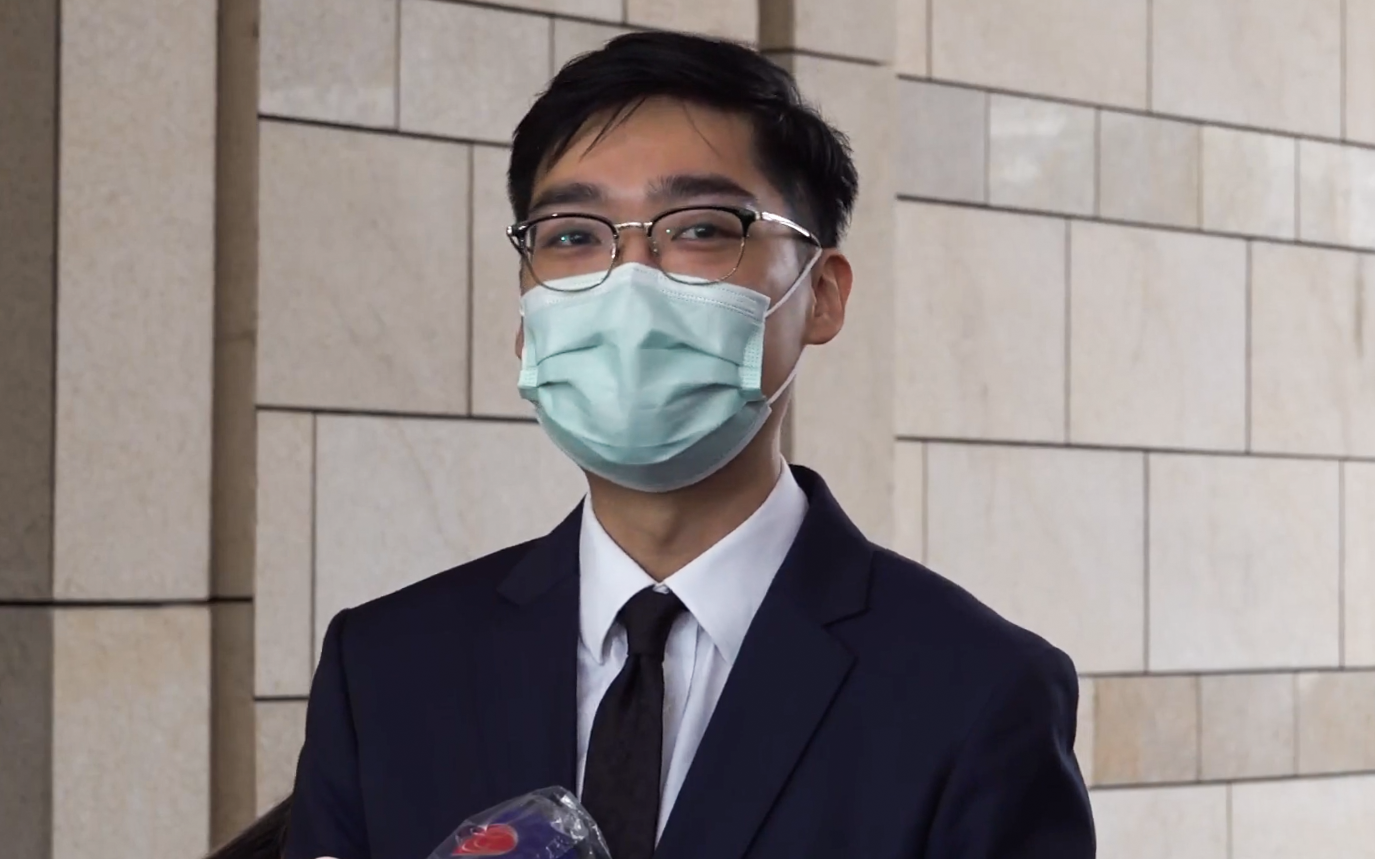
Former Hong Kong National Party Chan Ho-tin speaking to media after he was acquitted outside court

Former Hong Kong National Party convener Chan Ho-tin was charged with participating in unlawful assembly and slapped the police chief's helmet after the Liberate Sheung Shui rally on 13 July last year. He earlier denied the crime of illegal assembly and assaulting the police. Magistrate Wong Sze-lai pointed to the dispute whether the offender is really the defendant, the prosecutor lacking direct evidence, and the opinions and environmental evidence of expert witnesses also being difficult to identify. Chan was acquitted in the face of what was considered reasonable doubt about his guilt.

=== 12 Hong Kong activist's family letter urges lawyers in Hong Kong committee to plead guilty to Hong Kong ===
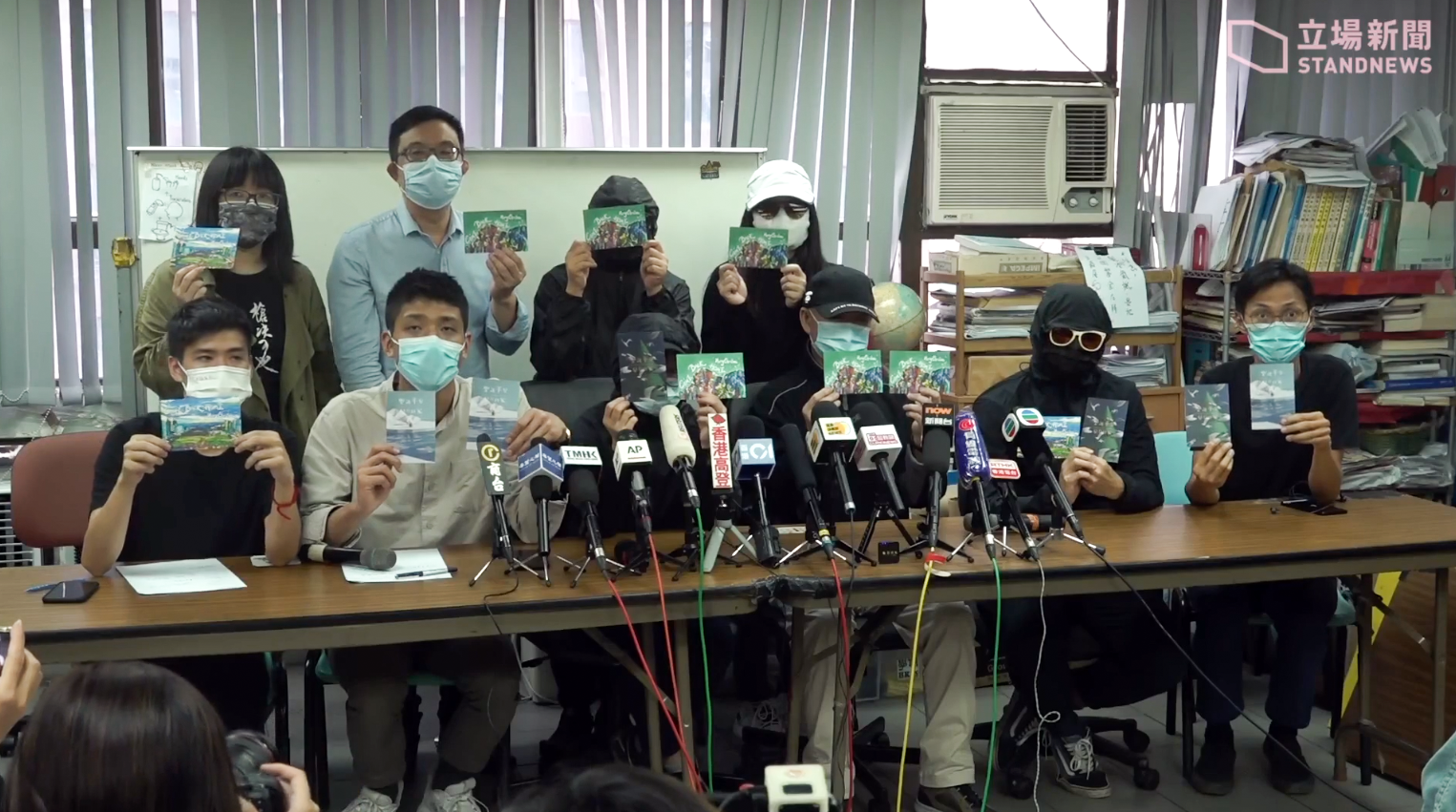
12 Hong Kong Activists Concern Group launched the One Person, One Card campaign for Christmas warming

The 12 Hong Kong Residents Concern Group launched the One Person, One Card campaign for Christmas warming, calling on the public to send Christmas cards to 12 Hong Kong activists and wishing them to return home as soon as possible The family members of 12 Hong Kong activists who were detained in Shenzhen for more than 100 days held a press conference. The family members of at least two of them received letters from the arrested. Some family members received calls from lawyers who claimed to be mainland officials. Among them, Andy Li's parents said that the family letter required them to appoint a lawyer in Hong Kong to confess to the crimes of rioting and assaulting the police in Hong Kong. The father questioned the difference between the judicial system in the Mainland and Hong Kong, and believed that the request was suspicious. The mother was worried that she would be tortured to extract a confession, so she was forced to write a letter asking for a confession. Wong Wai-yin's wife said that he received two calls from an official lawyer to inquire about the relationship between Huang and the other arrested persons, describing it as a migration. The family of Tang Kai-yin received a notice from the Bank of China that Tang's account was terminated due to commercial administrative reasons. Former LegCo member James To said on behalf of the mother of the underage arrested Huang Linfu that he received a call from the local, but the other party only spoke Mandarin. When Wong's mother asked the other party to speak Cantonese, the other party immediately closed the line and did not call afterwards. Hoang Lam Phuc's family hoped that the Vietnamese consul in Guangzhou could visit her son on her behalf.

== 13 December ==
=== Tsang Chi-kin's girlfriend seeking asylum in the UK ===
Apple Daily reported that Tsang Chi-kin, who was shot in the chest by a police officer during a demonstration in Tsuen Wan on 1 October 2019, and his 15-year-old girlfriend sought political asylum after arriving in London last week. This is the youngest confirmed exile protest. It was reported that she had participated in the demonstration and was arrested, but was not prosecuted because she was under 16 years old. Friends of Hong Kong, the British organization for assisting exiles, which is responsible for assisting the girl, issued a statement stating that she had been followed by unknown persons before leaving Hong Kong and that she would try to assist her in life after arriving in the UK. It also claimed that she was suffering from depression and would provide her psychological counseling and thank the British government for granting her political asylum.

=== Police welfare fund donations rise by HK$170 million ===
Security Bureau submitted the 2019/2020 annual report of the Police Welfare Fund to the Legislative Council. The total expenditure was HK$114 million, which was nearly twice the previous year. The main reason was the cost of refreshments for police officers holding special positions. The total annual income of the fund was HK$188 million, an increase of 8.66 times compared to the previous year's 6.3 million, mainly including an increase of HK$173 million in donation income, an increase of more than 26 times. Many establishment organizations also donated, but the report did not list the donors. Former LegCo member and vice-chairman of the Democratic Party, Lam Cheuk-ting criticized the "corruption of discipline" and questioned that the donations of relevant people caused the police to "let go".

The police stated that in the 2019-2020 fiscal year, they received a large number of inquiries from the public, stating that the police officers showed a high degree of professionalism and perseverance in handling illegal acts in anti-extradition bill protests, and hoped to express their support to the police through donations. On the other hand, the average expenditure per person per day for refreshments for police officers holding special duties is less than HK$7.

== 15 December ==
=== Bookazine bans the sale of Hong Kong chronicles of US writer due to the National Security Law ===
Hong Kong Free Press reported that the new book Frontline Hong Kong 1997–2020, published by the American writer Kent Ewing was originally scheduled to be released in September this year. However, the Hong Kong bookstore chain Bookazine banned the sale of related books. After the law, the bookstore hopes to keep a low-key stay 'under the radar', so the book will not be stored in the store for sale. The publisher Form Asia also sent an email to the author in September, stating that based on a series of reasons, it decided not to publish the book and was eventually cancelled.

=== British Foreign Minister urges Hong Kong government to stop targeting Jimmy Lai ===
British Foreign Secretary Dominic Raab said on 14 December that the Hong Kong national security law continued to attack the rights and freedoms of Hong Kong people, and violated the Sino-British Joint Declaration, calling on the Hong Kong government to stop targeting Hong Kong democrats and Hong Kong people, including media founder Jimmy Lai.

== 17 December ==
=== Former Scholarism member Frances Hui announced her departure from Hong Kong ===
Frances Hui, a 21-year-old member of the disbanded Scholarism, left a message on social platforms, saying that she had received multiple warnings a few months ago. She was originally scheduled to study journalism at Emerson College in Boston, Massachusetts. After graduating this summer, she decided to continue staying there because she will not return to Hong Kong. She describes that she can't return to Hong Kong for one lifetime, it will be a heavy price to cut off contact with her loved ones. She will continue to speak out for the silent in US.

=== Multiple statistics show that Hong Kong is undergoing an unprecedented wave of immigration to other countries ===
A reporter from Radio Free Asia checked a number of recent statistics and pointed out that many middle-class people in Hong Kong have already planned to immigrate in response to political uncertainties in 2019. After the implementation of the Hong Kong national security law, they are more quickly prepared for immigration, including continued to obtain British National (Overseas) passports and apply for offshore accounts, etc. According to Google search trends, keywords related to immigration and offshore accounts have become popular search keywords, and related words have soared from 17 to 23 May. And Ted Hui, a former member of the Democratic, announced his exile on 3 December. After his and his family's bank accounts were frozen, the search for the 'offshore account Citibank' also soared. According to the number of police applications for the issuance of Non-Criminal Record Certificates, starting from the anti-extradition bill protests in June 2019, more than 3,000 certificates have been issued per month, a record high in recent years. Economist Law Ka-chung estimates that most of the people who are planning to emigrate are the middle class and the lower-middle class. "The poorest and the richest can't leave." Chung Kim-wah, deputy chief executive of the Hong Kong Public Opinion Research Institute (PORI), pointed out that Hong Kong people's current immigration is for the sake of their children's education and concerns about Hong Kong's political situation. He also described the current Hong Kong people's 'panic' mentality.

== 19 December ==
=== Police Sports & Recreation Club bombing suspects brought to court ===
In the early morning of 1 December, the Police Sports & Recreation Club was bombed by molotov cocktails. After checking a large number of CCTV footages, the police arrested three young people aged 16 to 23 in Tai Wai, Kwai Chung and Tsim Sha Tsui, and seized the manufacture on the rooftop of the 3-nil Building in Mong Kok. The raw materials of petrol bombs, three people will be charged with arson and will appear in West Kowloon Magistrates' Courts. The charge is that they used fire to damage a police van worth HK$1 million in the parking lot of the Police Sports & Recreation Club on 1 December, with the intention of damaging the property or ignoring whether the property would be damaged. The three people do not need to respond for the time being. The case was postponed until 24 December when police conduct the identification procedures of the three prosecution witnesses. The three defendants are not allowed to be released on bail and must be remanded in custody.

=== Mike Pompeo: 12 Hongkongers are trying to escape from tyranny ===
U.S. Secretary of State Mike Pompeo posted on Twitter that the 12 Hong Kong people suspected of crossing the border were only trying to escape tyranny, criticizing China for "actively preventing its own people from seeking freedom elsewhere", and comparing Hong Kong to the former East Berlin. A spokesperson of the SAR government expressed strong dissatisfaction with Pompeo's remarks, saying that they "totally disregarded the facts and confused right and wrong".

== 21 December ==
=== Court of Final Appeal ruled mask ban was constitutional ===
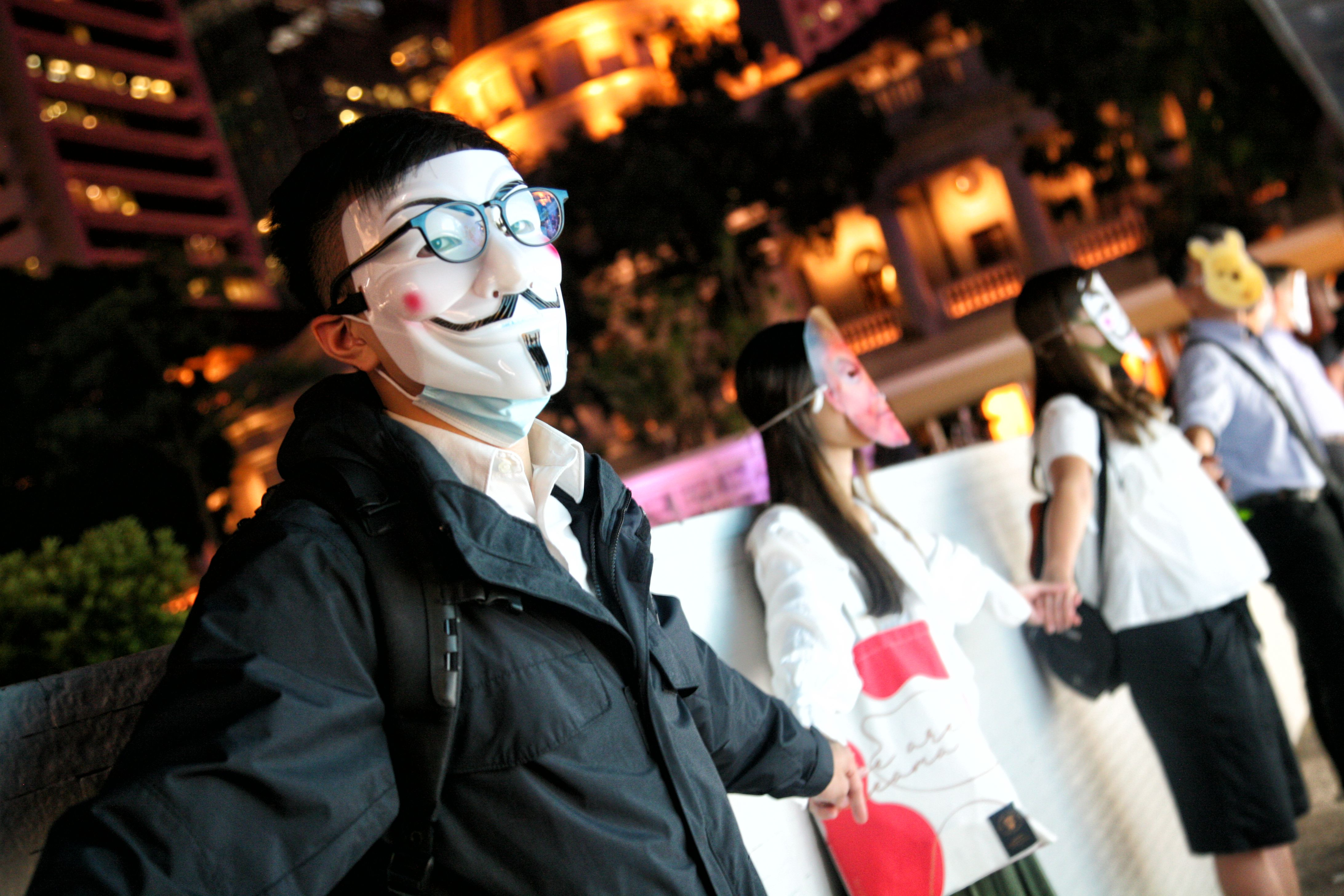
Protesters wearing masks while holding hands with fellow protesters outside Court of Final Appeal building at night

The Court of Final Appeal ruled that the Hong Kong government had the right to invoke colonial-era emergency powers to ban the wearing of masks at all public processions and meetings during the height of the protests in 2019.

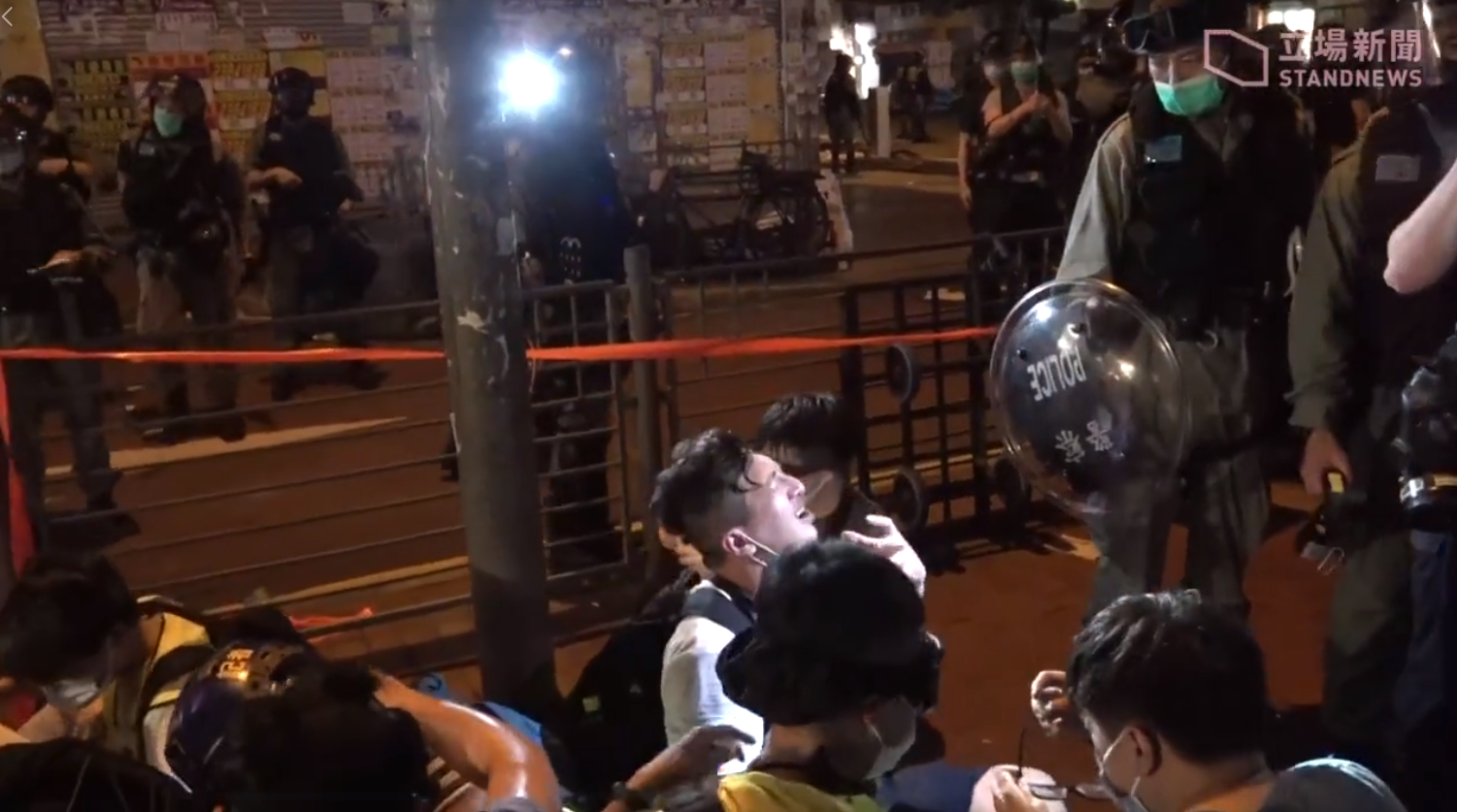
Reporters getting stopped by police officers during protests

=== Journalists Association loses legal challenge at High Court ===
Hong Kong Journalists Association earlier filed a judicial review, alleging that police officers repeatedly obstructed reporters' interviews and used excessive force on reporters during the anti-extradition bill protests last year. Judge Anderson Chow of the High Court pointed out that the two parties had disputes over some of the allegations in the case, and the allegations could not be confirmed. He ruled that they lost the case. Hong Kong Journalists Association, which is responsible for filing, expressed extreme disappointment.

=== Nathan Law applies for political asylum in the UK ===
Nathan Law, a former Demosistō member living overseas, said that he would apply for political asylum in the UK. He claimed that he was listed as a wanted criminal under the national security law and could not return to his hometown. And if he does not act, he will become a person without a passport or identity. He also said that "I will never give up my identity as a Hong Kong citizen."

== 22 December ==
=== U.S. Department of Commerce blacklists flight services ===
The U.S. Department of Commerce published a blacklist of 103 Chinese and Russian entities, alleging that they are connected to the military. This includes the Hong Kong Government Flying Service, which will be restricted from purchasing various American products and technologies.

=== Tsang Chi-kin reportedly gone into exile ===
A student, Tsang Chi-kin, who was shot and injured by a police officer during the demonstration in Tsuen Wan on 1 October 2019, did not attend the District Court hearing. Judge Justin Ko issued an arrest warrant. The overseas activists group Friends of Hong Kong issued a statement on behalf of Tsang, in which he said that on 27 October 2020, he and other protesters had gone to the U.S. Consulate in Hong Kong to ask in vain for help. The statement said that Tsang and others were currently living with a U.S. citizen and did not disclose their current location.

Tsang and three others were arrested in July 2022 when attempting to flee from Hong Kong to Taiwan. Police said that they had been hiding in safehouses for two years previously. He was sentenced on 18 October 2023 to 3.5 years in prison for rioting and assaulting a police officer after having pleaded guilty the previous month. The same day, he was handed a sentence of 11 months and two weeks for perverting the course of justice.

== 23 December ==
=== Jimmy Lai released on bail ===
On 23 December, media tycoon Jimmy Lai was released on bail for HK$10 million, after his bail application was granted by High Court judge Alex Lee. His bail conditions included surrendering his travel documents, not taking interviews with local and foreign media in any form, not leaving Hong Kong, not making any public statement which endangers national security, not meeting with foreign officials, no posting on social media, and not publishing articles; he could only go out for reporting to police.

Chinese state-owned media have denounced Lai's release. People's Daily, a CCP mouthpiece newspaper, stated the release was severely undermining rule of law and he must be punished. Lai was described by the newspaper as "dangerous".

== 24 December ==
=== Police guarding multi-zone amid call by netizens ===
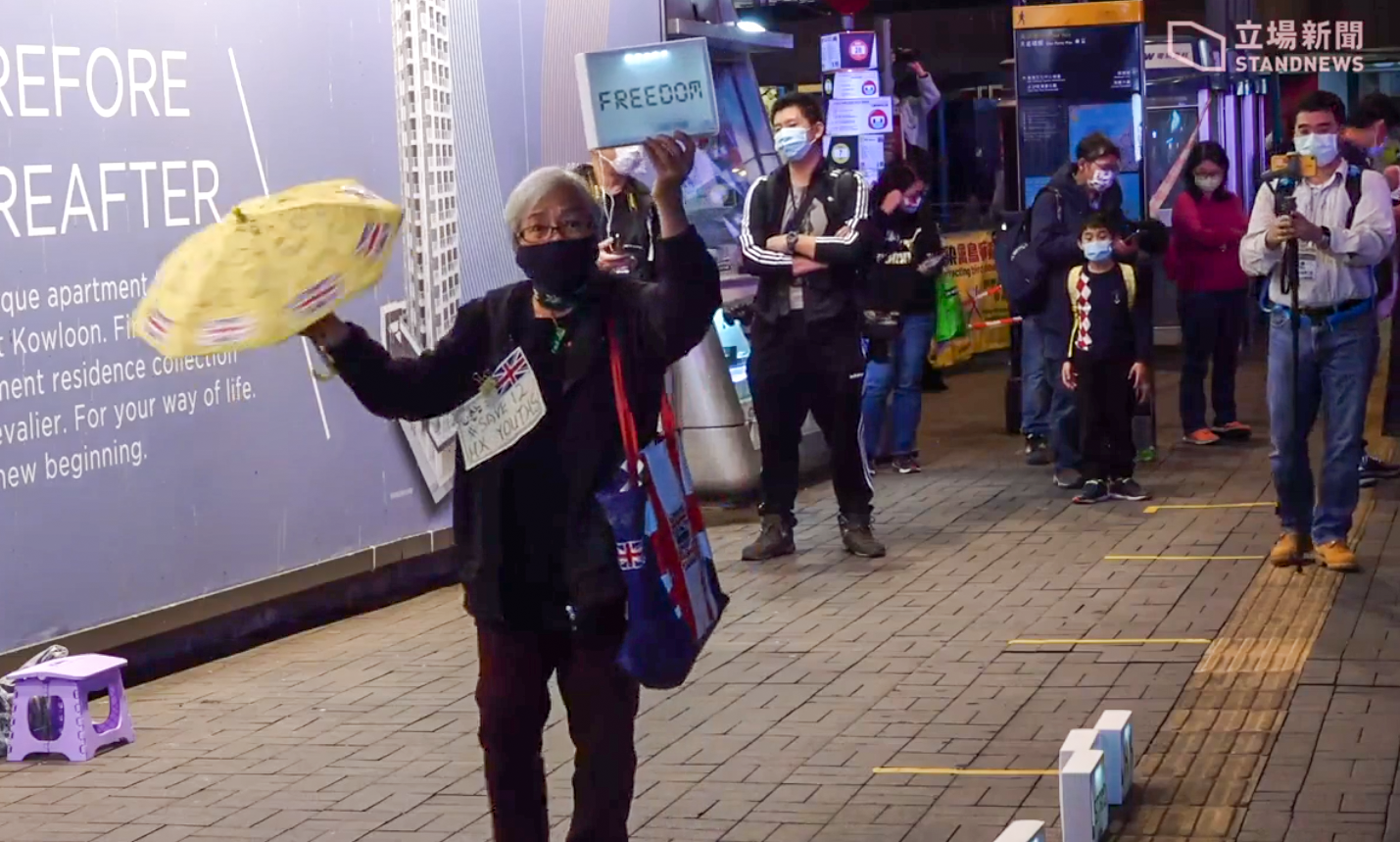
Grandma Wong protesting on 24 December in Tsim Sha Tsui

On Christmas Eve, netizens plan to hold a candlelight gathering at the Hundred Step Ladder of Sha Tin Town Hall, Yuen Long West Rail station, Kwun Tong Promenade and Victoria Park Basketball Court in Causeway Bay. The police patrolled and guarded closely in many districts, and intercepted citizens and reporters. No crowds were seen. In Sha Tin, two 12-year-old and 13-year-old teenagers were found with weapons such as air guns and were arrested on suspicion of possessing imitation firearms. After Yuen Long District Councillor Ng Kin-wai appeared at the Yuen Long West Rail station, he was also intercepted by several police officers and asked to leave.

In addition, a number of police officers were on guard near the Tsim Sha Tsui Ferry Pier. Alexandra Wong, known as 'Grandma Wong', showed off the 'Save12' light board and shouted anti-extradition bill protests slogans, attracting the public to watch. While some people filmed a large number of Speed Tactical Contingent on guard in Mong Kok, Yau Tsim Mong District Councillor Ben Lam criticized that the police action completely destroyed the Christmas Eve atmosphere and made passers-by feeling unsafe.

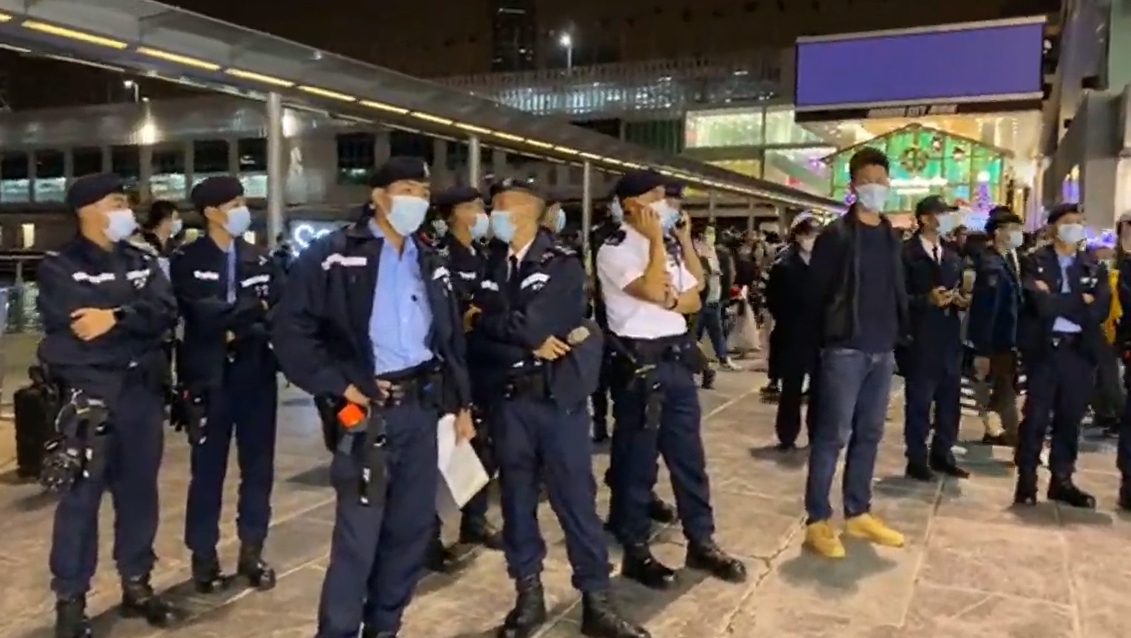
A number of blue hat police officers on guard at Five Flagpoles in Harbour City

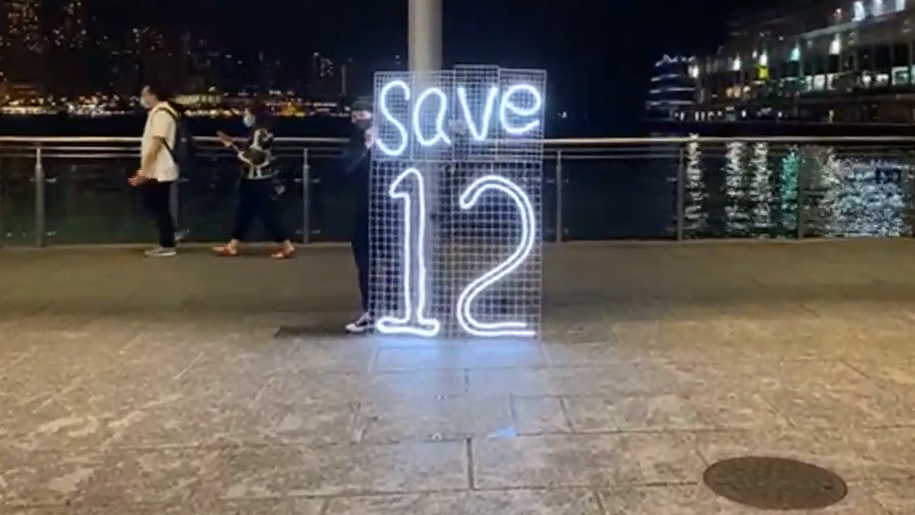
'Save 12' neon signage at the entrance of Harbour City

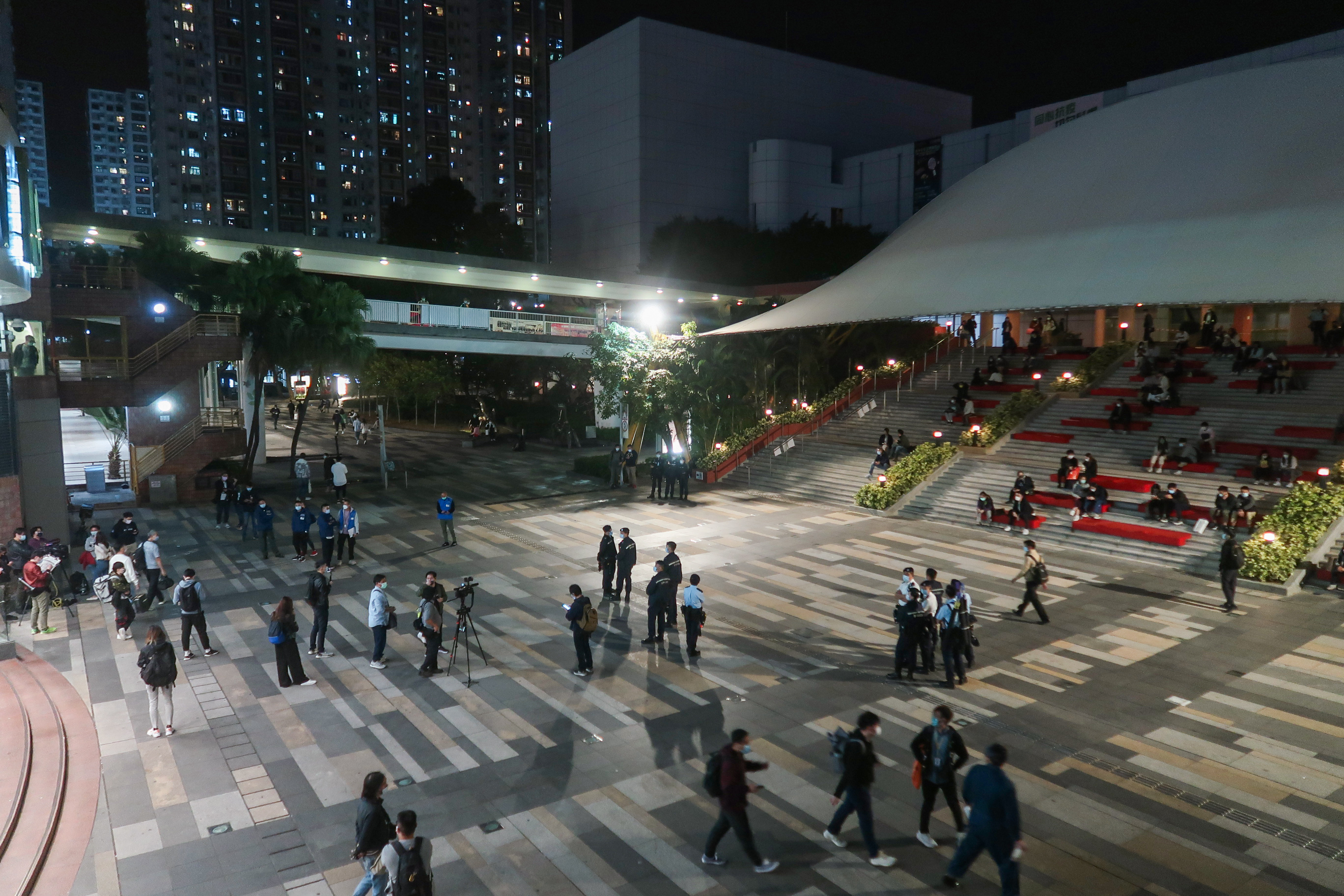
A large number of police officers are on guard outside the hundred steps of the Sha Tin New Town Hall.

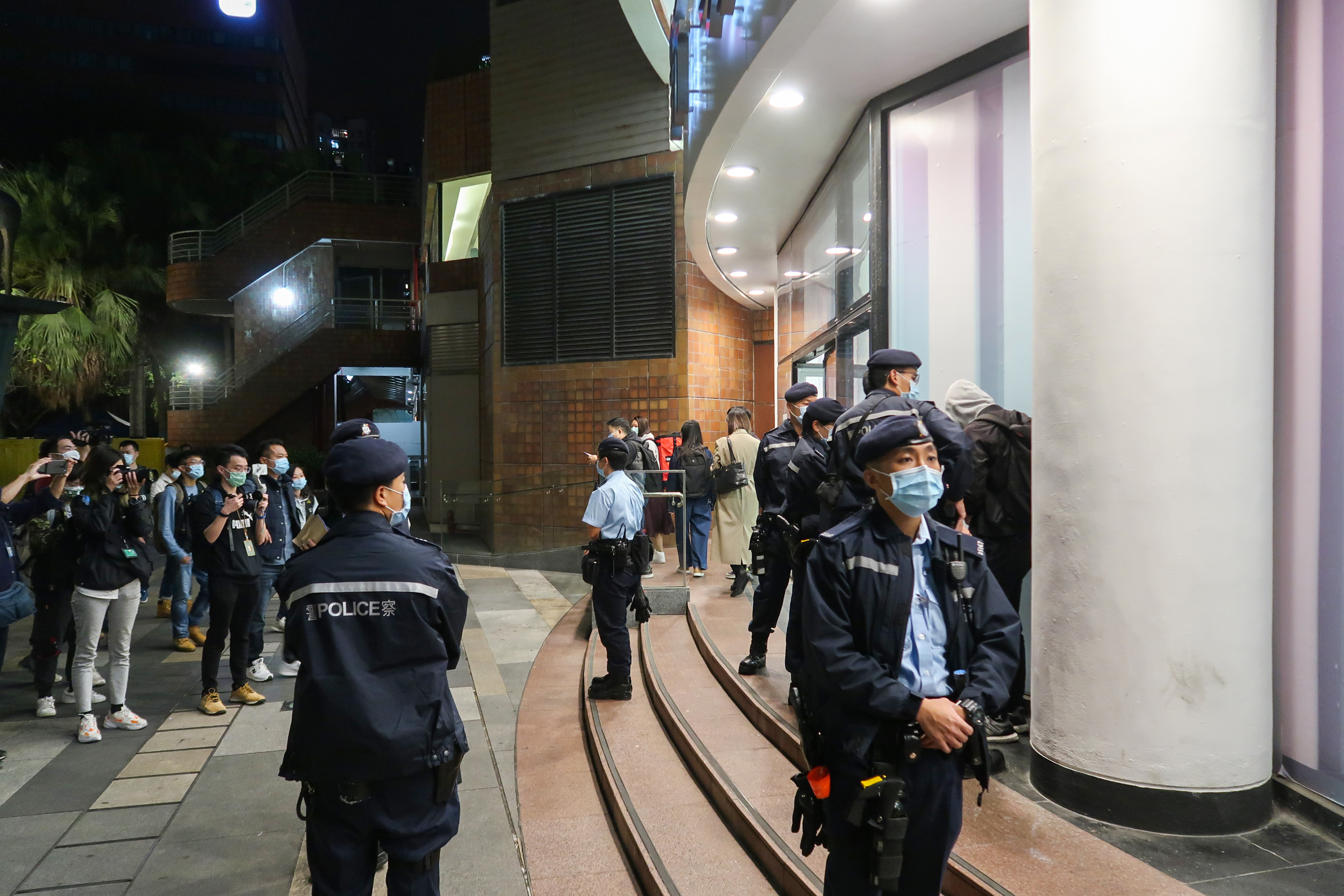
A young man was intercepted at the entrance of the New Town Plaza.

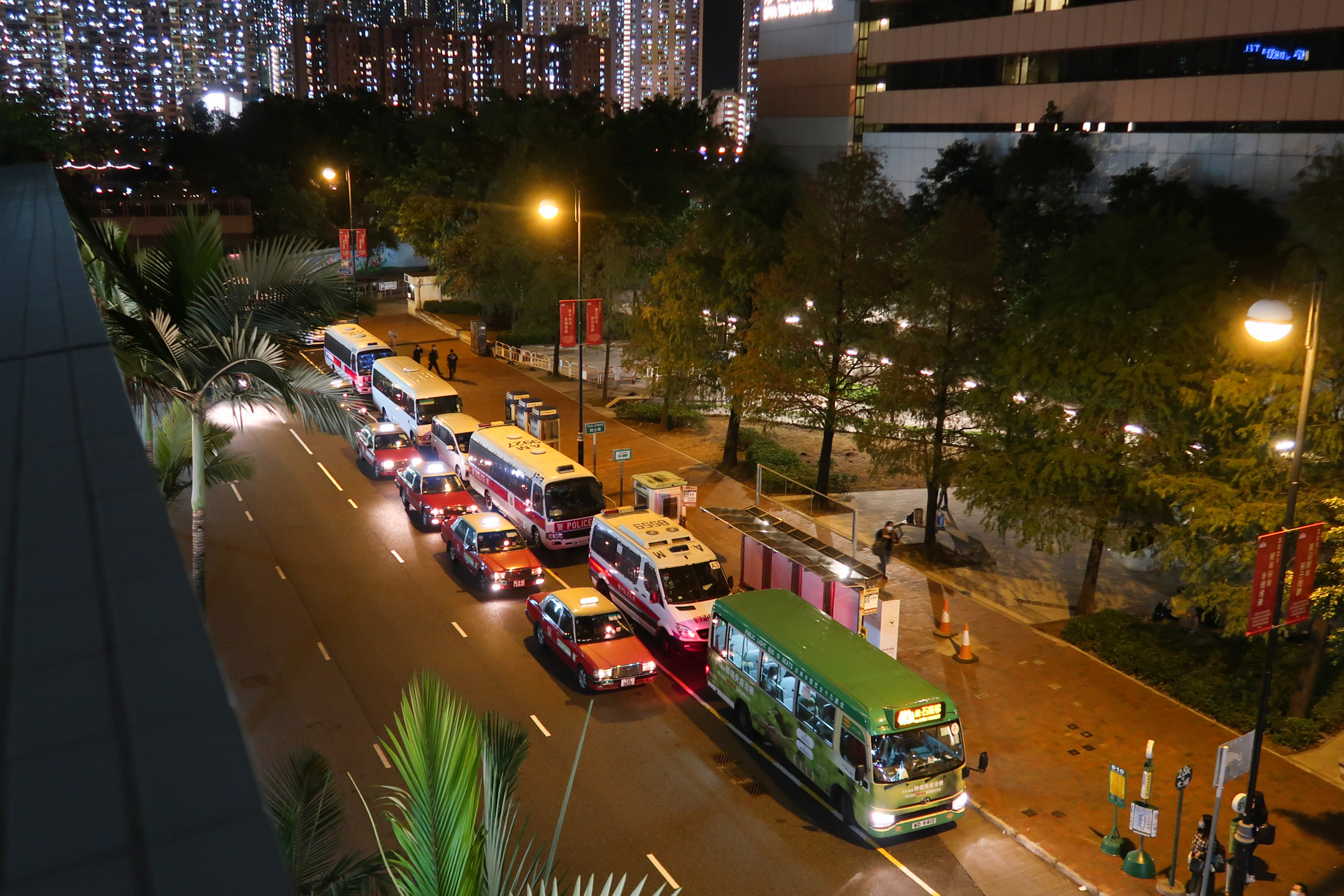
Several police cars parked outside Sha Tin New Town Hall.

== 27 December ==
=== About 30 Hong Kong activists overseas reported to be wanted ===
South China Morning Post reported that about 30 Hong Kong activists overseas were wanted by the police for violating the Hong Kong national security law, including former LegCo members Ted Hui and Baggio Leung, and former spokespersons of now-defunct Hong Kong Higher Institutions International Affairs Delegation Sunny Cheung, who left Hong Kong earlier, and Brian Leung, former editor-in-chief of Undergrad. Most of the wanted were reported to live in Europe, United States and Taiwan.

== 28 December ==
=== Lam Cheuk-ting rearrested by ICAC ===
In the morning, Lam Cheuk-ting, the vice chairman of the Democratic Party and a former LegCo member, was arrested by the Independent Commission Against Corruption. He was accused of being involved in disclosing the identity of the person under investigation in the Yuen Long 721 incident and was charged with three cases of disclosing the identity of the person under investigation. Chief Magistrate Bina Chainrai adjourned the case until March 9, 2021. Lam was released on bail of HK$2,000, during which time he was not allowed to leave Hong Kong and must live at the reported address.

=== US urges China to release 12 Hong Kong activists ===
Prior to the court hearing in the case of the 12 Hong Kong activists, the U.S. Embassy in China issued a statement calling on the Chinese authorities to immediately release them. The statement said that "the so-called "crime" of the 12 had been to "flee tyranny". In response, the Chinese Foreign Ministry called on the US to "immediately stop interfering in China's internal affairs through the Hong Kong issue".

== 30 December ==
=== Sentencing of 12 Hong Kong activists ===
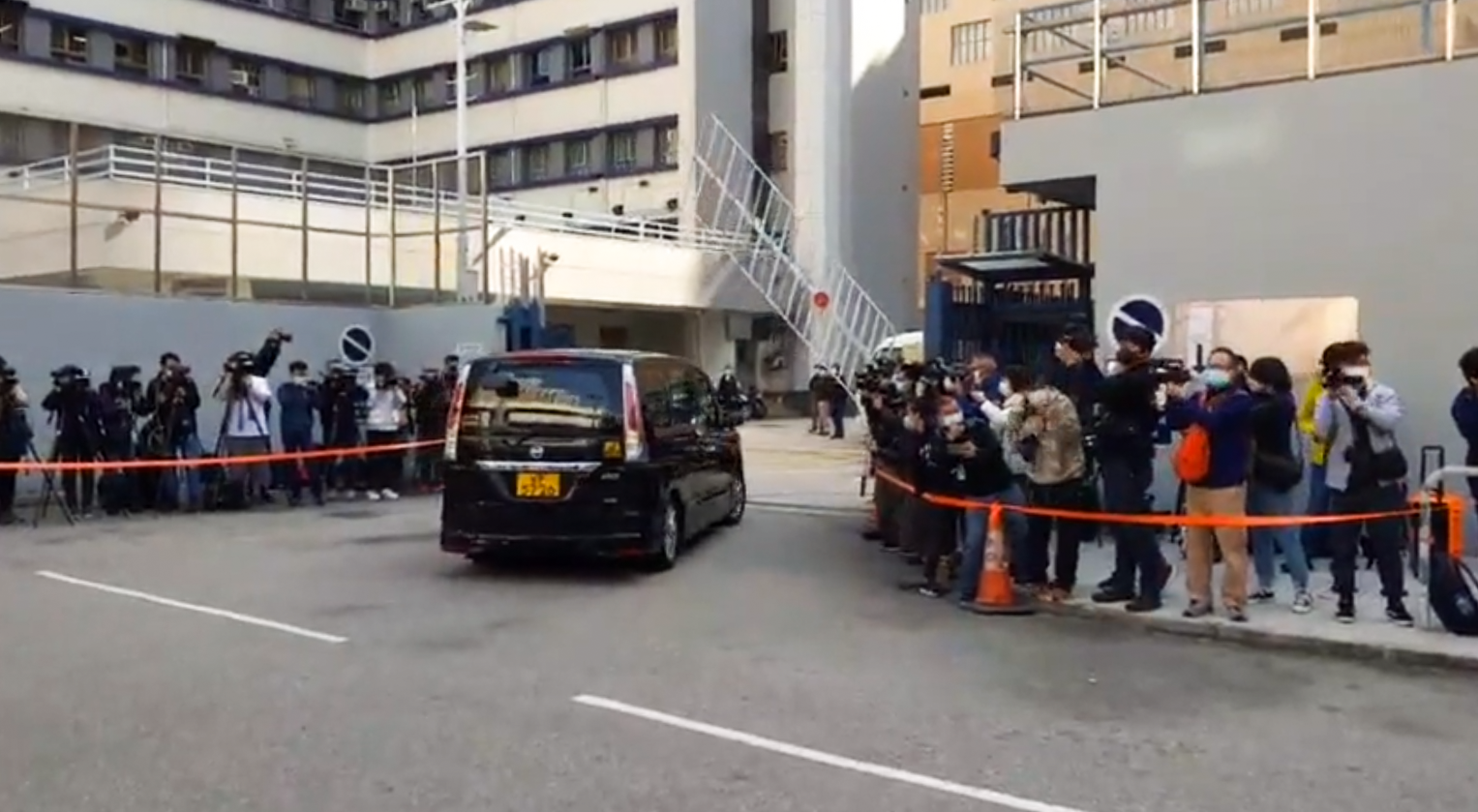
Two of the 12 Hong Kong activists are minors, sent back to Hong Kong to the Tin Shui Wai Police Station, where a large number of reporters came to take pictures

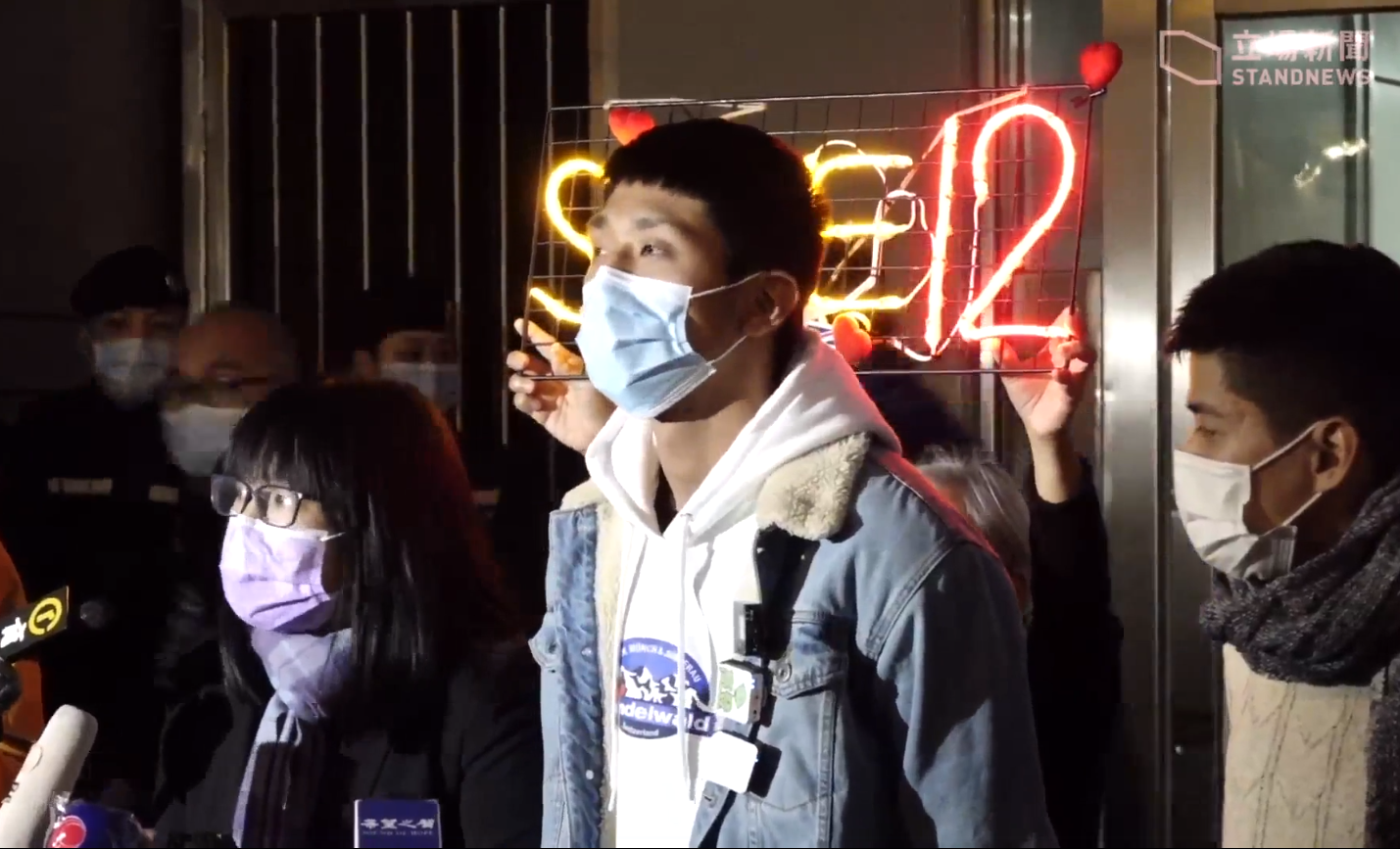
Owen Chow, Eddie Chu, Lester Shum and Chow Hang-tung, who have been assisting the families of 12 Hong Kong activists, were present

Yantian District People's Court of Shenzhen City pronounced a sentence on the case of 12 Hong Kong activists who had tried to flee to Taiwan. Tang Kai-yin was sentenced to three years imprisonment for "organizing others to cross a border illegally" and fined 20,000 yuan, while Quinn Moon was sentenced to two years in prison on the same charge and fined 15,000 yuan. As for Cheng Tsz-ho, Yim Man-him, Cheung Ming-yu, Cheung Chun-fu, Wong Wai-yin, Li Tsz-yin, Andy Li, and Kok Tse-lun who were convicted of the crime of crossing the border, they were sentenced to 7 months in prison and fined 10,000 yuan each.

The two who were minors at the time of the attempted crossing to Taiwan, Liu Sze-man and Hoang Lam Phuc, were handed over by Shenzhen police to the Hong Kong police via the Shenzhen Bay Port, and then the two were taken to the Tin Shui Wai Police Station for investigation. Their family and lawyers met with them briefly.

== 31 December ==
=== Jimmy Lai has his bail revoked and is remanded in prison ===
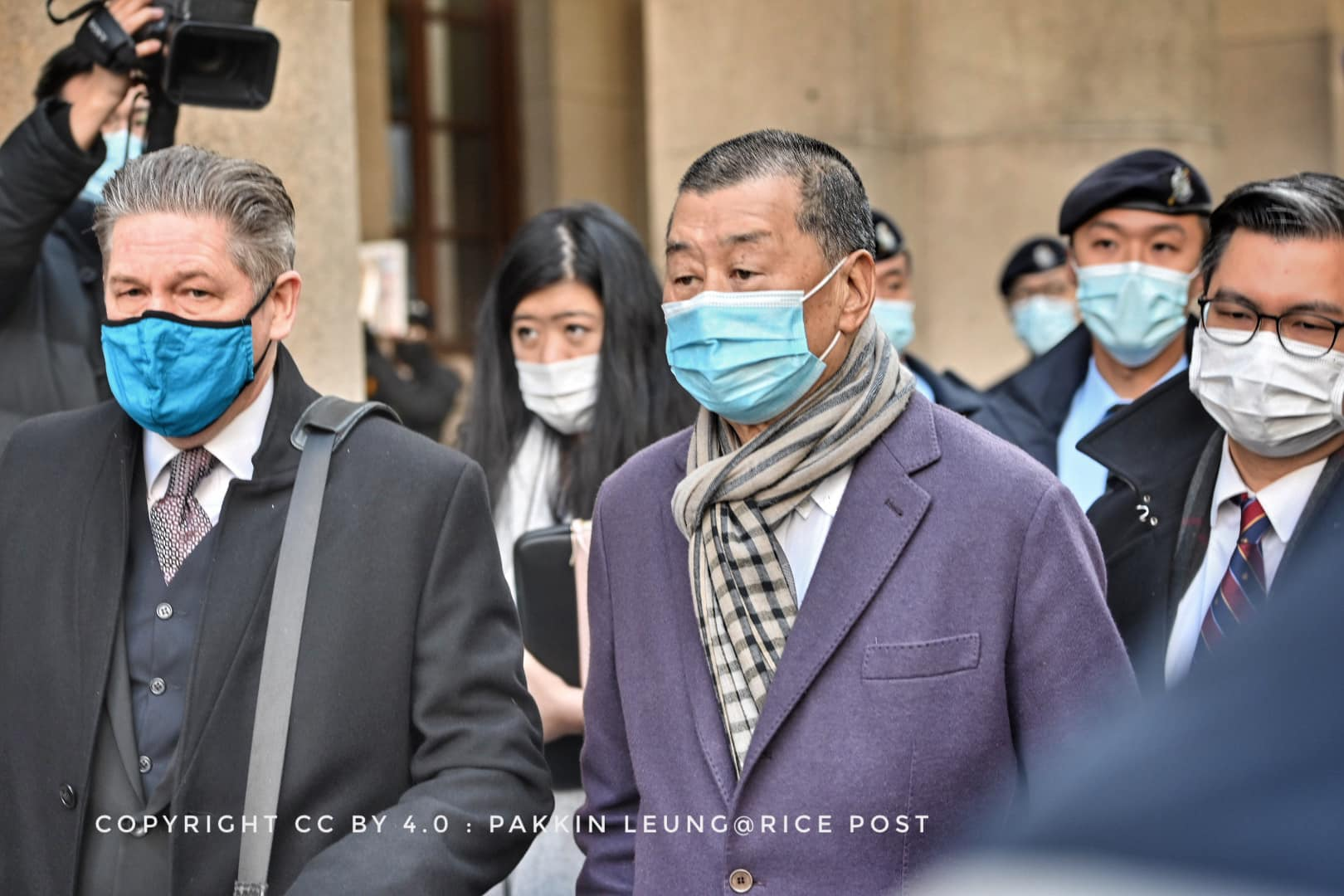
Jimmy Lai with his lawyers before entering the Court of Final Appeal building

Founder of Next Digital, Jimmy Lai, had been charged with fraud and violation of the Hong Kong national security law. He had been granted bail by the High Court. The Department of Justice appealed against the decision and applied for a temporary remand order, which the Court of Final Appeal allowed. The court held that the judge of the High Court, Alex Lee, may have misapplied Article 42 of the national security law when handling relevant bail applications. Lai was taken by a prison car to Lai Chi Kok Reception Center.

=== Agnes Chow moved to high-security prison ===
Hong Kong media reported on 31 December that jailed activist Agnes Chow was moved from Lo Wu Correctional Institution to Tai Lam Centre for Women, a Category A (high-security) prison where she had been previously remanded until sentenced on 2 December. The Correctional Services Department declined to comment on Chow's case, saying only that crimes committed, length of sentence and the extent to which someone was a security risk would all be taken into account.
