= Tai Lam Centre for Women =

Women's prison in Hong Kong

Coordinates: 22°22′18″N 114°01′29″E

- Traditional Chinese: 大欖女懲教所
- Simplified Chinese: 大榄女惩教所
Transcriptions
Standard Mandarin
- Hanyu Pinyin: Dàlǎn Nǚchéng Jiàosuǒ
Yue: Cantonese
- Jyutping: daai6 laam5*2 neoi5 cing4 gaau3 so2

Tai Lam Centre for Women is a maximum security women's prison in Tuen Mun, Hong Kong. It is operated by Hong Kong Correctional Services and currently has a capacity of 391 prisoners. It was established in 1969. As of 1992 illegal immigrants from China were placed in Tai Lam, and the prison was overcrowded by about 60%. At one time the prison held 817 prisoners even though its facilities were officially for 278 prisoners. As of 1997 only two male prison guards had contact with the female prisoners: the technical instructor and superintendent.

== Notable prisoners ==
- Agnes Chow - Political activist
- Nancy Kissel - Convicted of the murder of Robert Kissel
- Pamela Peck - Radio host
- Jenny Li Sui-heung - Convicted of the murder of Abby Choi
