= Agnes Chow =

Hong Kong pro-democracy activist (born 1996)

- 周庭
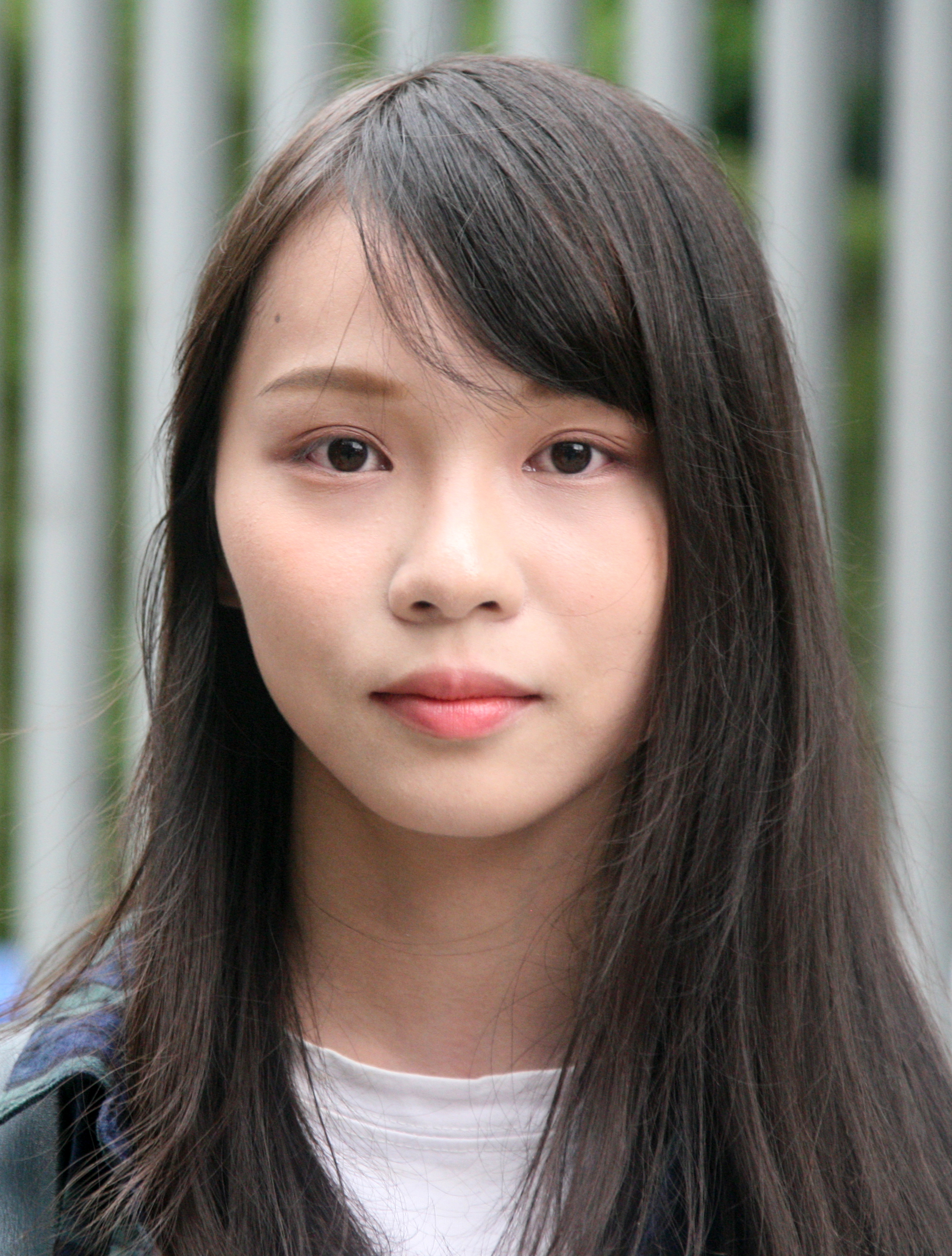
- Chow in 2019 at Tim Mei Avenue

Personal details
- Born: Chow Ting; 3 December 1996 (age 29) British Hong Kong
- Citizenship: China (Hong Kong) (since 1997); United Kingdom (until 2018)
- Party: Demosisto (2016–2020)
- Education: OCAD University
- Occupation: Politician
- Known for: Spokesperson for Scholarism; co-founder of Demosistō
- Nickname: "Goddess of Democracy"

Chinese name
- Chinese: 周庭
Transcriptions
Standard Mandarin
- Hanyu Pinyin: Zhōu Tíng
Yue: Cantonese
- Jyutping: Zau1 Ting4

YouTube information
- Channel: 周庭チャンネル
- Years active: 2020–present
- Subscribers: 403K
- Views: 17,962,478
- Last updated: 27 July 2026

Agnes Chow Ting (Chinese: 周庭; born 3 December 1996) is a Hong Kong political candidate and social activist. She is a former member of the Standing Committee and Deputy Secretary-General of Demosisto and former spokesperson of Scholarism. In these capacities, she became known for her pro-democracy activism.

Her candidacy for the 2018 Hong Kong Island by-election under the Demosisto banner, supported by the pro-democracy camp, was blocked by authorities, due to her party's advocacy towards self-determination for Hong Kong.

She was arrested in August 2019, during the 2019–2020 Hong Kong protests, for her role in a protest at police headquarters two months earlier, and in December 2020 was sentenced to 10 months in jail. She was released in June 2021.

She was also arrested for the National Security charge of 'collusion with foreign forces' in August 2020, but was released on bail the day after. In December 2023, she revealed she skipped bail on the national security charge and went into exile in Canada in September 2023 to pursue a master’s degree at OCAD University, from which she graduated in 2025.

== Personal life ==
Agnes Chow was born on 3 December 1996 in Hong Kong during British colonial rule. She has described her household as apolitical. Her social activism began around the age of 15, after being inspired by a Facebook post with thousands of young people agitating against education overhauls. According to Chow, her Catholic upbringing had an influence on her participation in social movements: she stated the religion's basis is "that we need to learn how to care about people who need help..."

In 2014, Chow began attending Hong Kong Baptist University, where she studied government and international relations. In 2018, Chow deferred her final year of university studies in order to run in the Hong Kong Island by-election.

Chow is fluent in Cantonese, Mandarin, English, and Japanese, and taught herself Japanese by watching Japanese variety shows. Chow has appeared in Japanese media, interviews, and news programmes.

In February 2020, Chow launched a YouTube channel, where she uploaded vlogging videos in both Cantonese and Japanese. She has also reviewed viral clips, including one review of a video of a police officer where she was dressed as Uncle Roger. As of December 2020, Chow had over 300,000 subscribers.

== Early activism ==
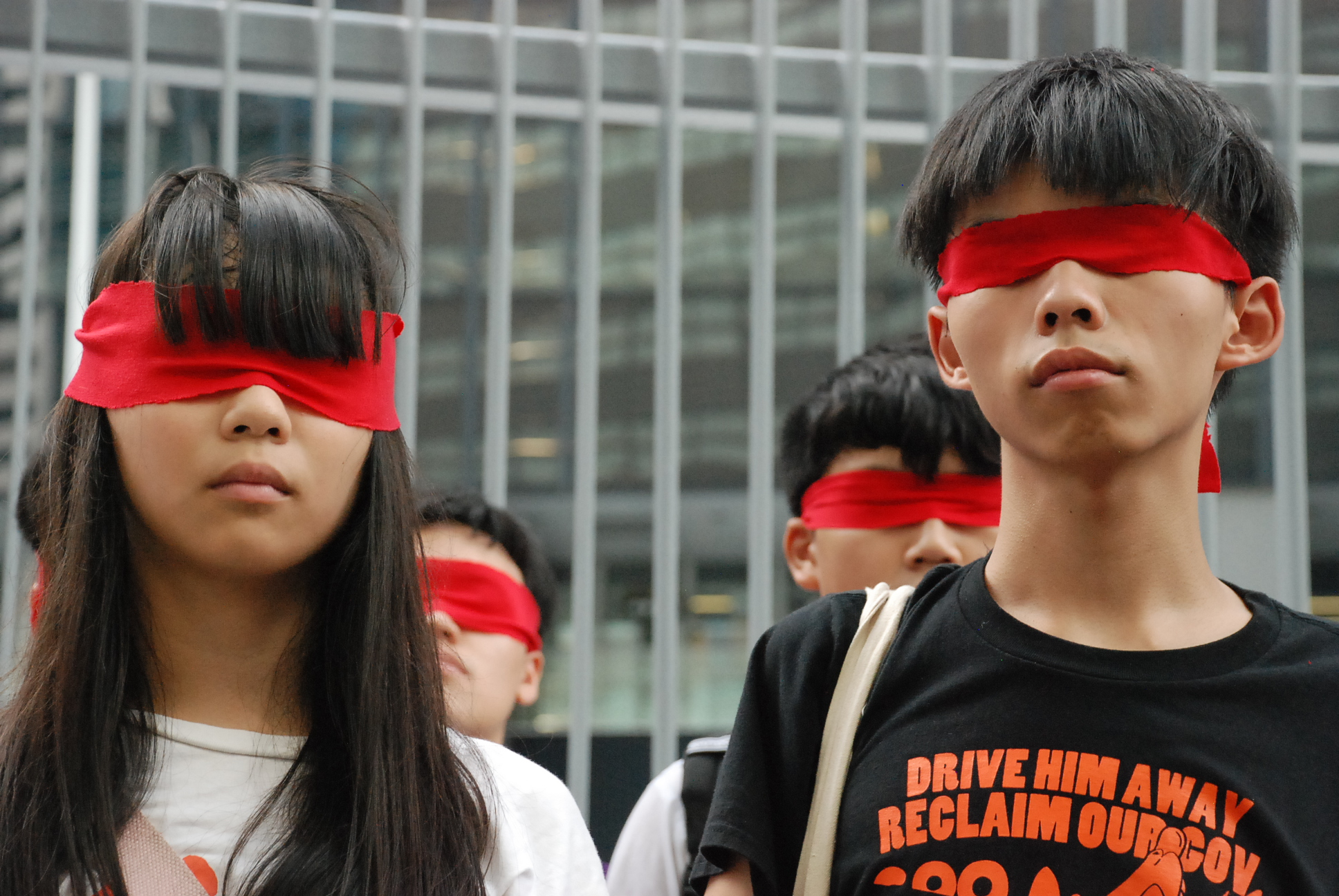
Agnes Chow and Joshua Wong pictured on 23 September 2014, wearing red blindfolds to symbolise students figuratively blinded by China's political power.

Chow first became known in 2012, when she became the spokesperson of student activist group Scholarism during her time as a student. She protested against the implementation of the Moral and National Education scheme. She met fellow activists Joshua Wong and Ivan Lam at a demonstration during these protests. The movement successfully brought thousands of protesters to gather in front of the Central Government Complex, which led to the government backing down.

In 2014, Chow collaborated with student organizations to advocate for electoral reform in Hong Kong. Chow was a leader of the 2014 Occupy protests dubbed the "Umbrella Revolution". During the protests, citing heavy political pressure, Chow stepped away from politics, including resigning as spokesperson of Scholarism, and focused on school. When questioned about her reasoning later, however, she instead cited parental concerns for her safety, and stated that she "continued to be involved in the movement behind the scenes". In January 2016, she called for transparency about missing booksellers.

== Demosistō ==
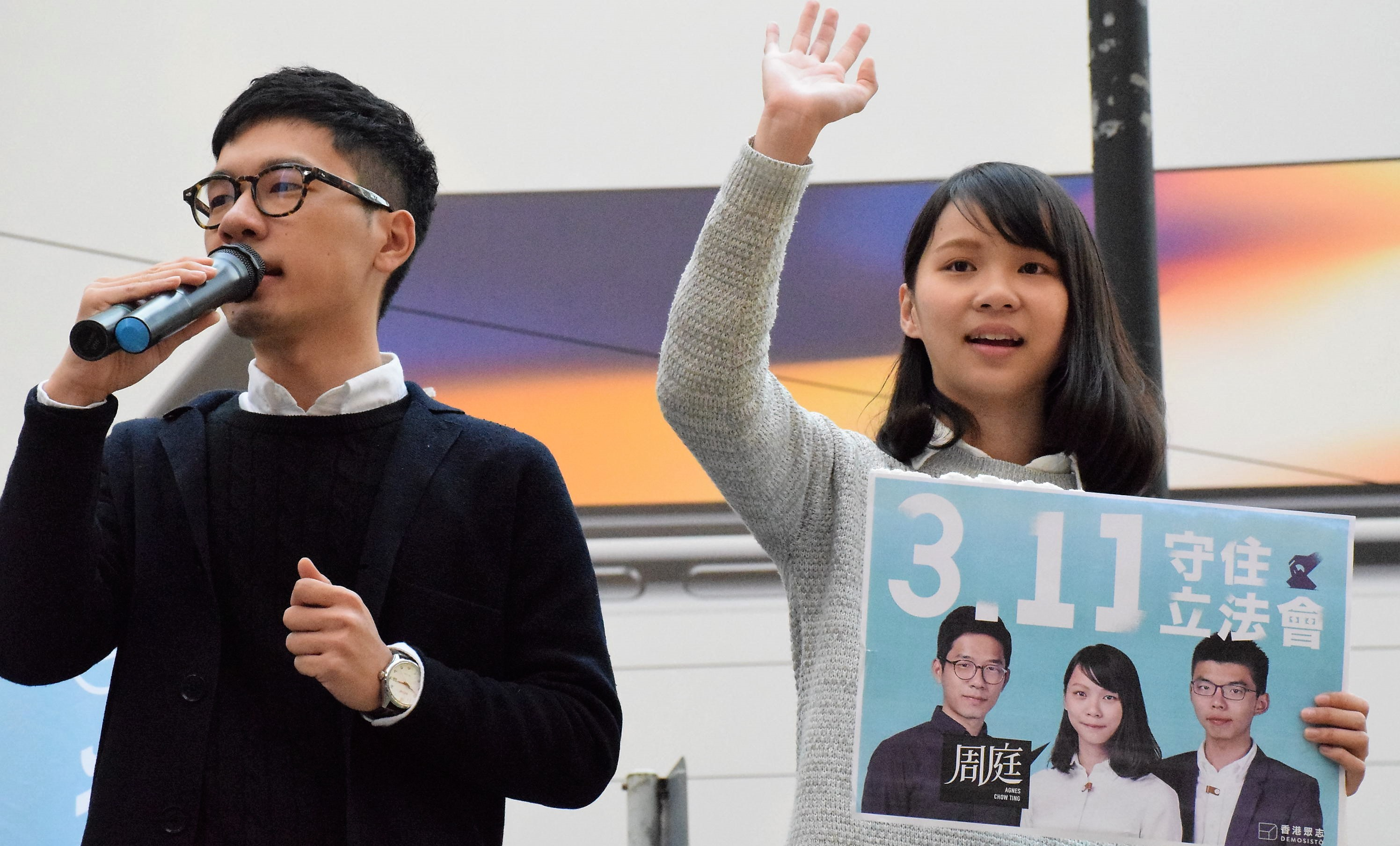
Agnes Chow campaigning with Nathan Law for the 2018 Hong Kong Island by-election.

In April 2016, Chow co-founded political party Demosistō with Joshua Wong and Nathan Law, also student leaders in the Occupy protests. She was the first deputy secretary-general of the party. She campaigned with party chairman Law in the 2016 Legislative Council election, in which the latter was elected as the youngest-ever member of the Legislative Council. In 2017, she participated in a protest ahead of the visit of General Secretary of the Chinese Communist Party Xi Jinping, in which protesters covered the Golden Bauhinia statue with banners. She was arrested along with Law and Demosistō secretary-general Wong.

On 30 June 2020, Chow, Law and Wong announced that they had disbanded Demosistō. The announcement came just hours after Beijing passed the national security law in Hong Kong, which raised concerns in observers of political persecution of activists.

== Legislative Council bid ==
After Law was ejected from the Legislative Council over the oath-taking controversy in July 2017 and sentenced to imprisonment in August of the same year, Chow became Demosistō's candidate in the 2018 Hong Kong Island by-election. To qualify for the election, she renounced her British nationality. On 27 January 2018, her candidacy was disqualified by the Electoral Affairs Commission, who claimed that she "cannot possibly comply with the requirements of the relevant electoral laws, since advocating or promoting 'self-determination' is contrary to the content of the declaration that the law requires." Chow subsequently filed an appeal against the decision.

Michael Davis, a former law professor of the University of Hong Kong, warned that Chow's disqualification was wrong and the government was on a "slippery slope". Former university law dean Johannes Chan said there was no legal basis for such a move. Basic Law Committee member Albert Chen Hung-yee said election rules were not clear that returning officers had the power to disqualify candidates based on their political views. However, Hong Kong Chief Executive Carrie Lam asserted that "any suggestion of Hong Kong independence, self-determination, independence as a choice or self-autonomy... deviates from the important principle of 'one country two systems'."

After Chow's disqualification, Demosistō endorsed pro-democracy candidate Au Nok-hin, who won the by-election. On 2 September 2019, Chow succeeded in her appeal after the judge ruled that "she had insufficient opportunity to respond to the grounds for disqualification". Since her ban was overturned by the Hong Kong Court, Au lost his Legislative Council seat as the court claimed he was not duly elected. After the ruling, Chow described the result as a "pyrrhic victory" due to it providing "the electoral officers... power to revoke a candidacy".

== Arrests, imprisonment and exile ==
=== Police headquarters assembly case ===
Chow was arrested on 30 August 2019 at her Tai Po home for participating in, and inciting, an unauthorised assembly at Wan Chai Hong Kong Police Headquarters on 21 June 2019 during the 2019–2020 Hong Kong protests. On the same day, many high-profile Hong Kong pro-democracy figures were arrested, including Joshua Wong, Au Nok-hin, Chan Ho-tin, and Jeremy Tam. She was freed the same day on bail, but her smartphone, like those of her fellow arrestees, was confiscated by police. Amnesty International called the arrests "an outrageous assault" on freedom of expression. Chow pleaded guilty to the charges on 6 July 2020. She was convicted on 5 August 2020.

Chow, Lam, and Wong had a hearing at the West Kowloon District Court on 5 August 2020, where Chow maintained her guilty plea but both Lam and Wong pled innocent. Their first day in trial in the West Kowloon District court was on 23 November 2020, where Lam and Wong changed their plea to guilty. They were then put in custody until a sentencing trial scheduled on 2 December 2020. She stated "While I say I have mentally prepared for this, I am still a bit scared." She was remanded at the Tai Lam Centre for Women in Tuen Mun until the trial.

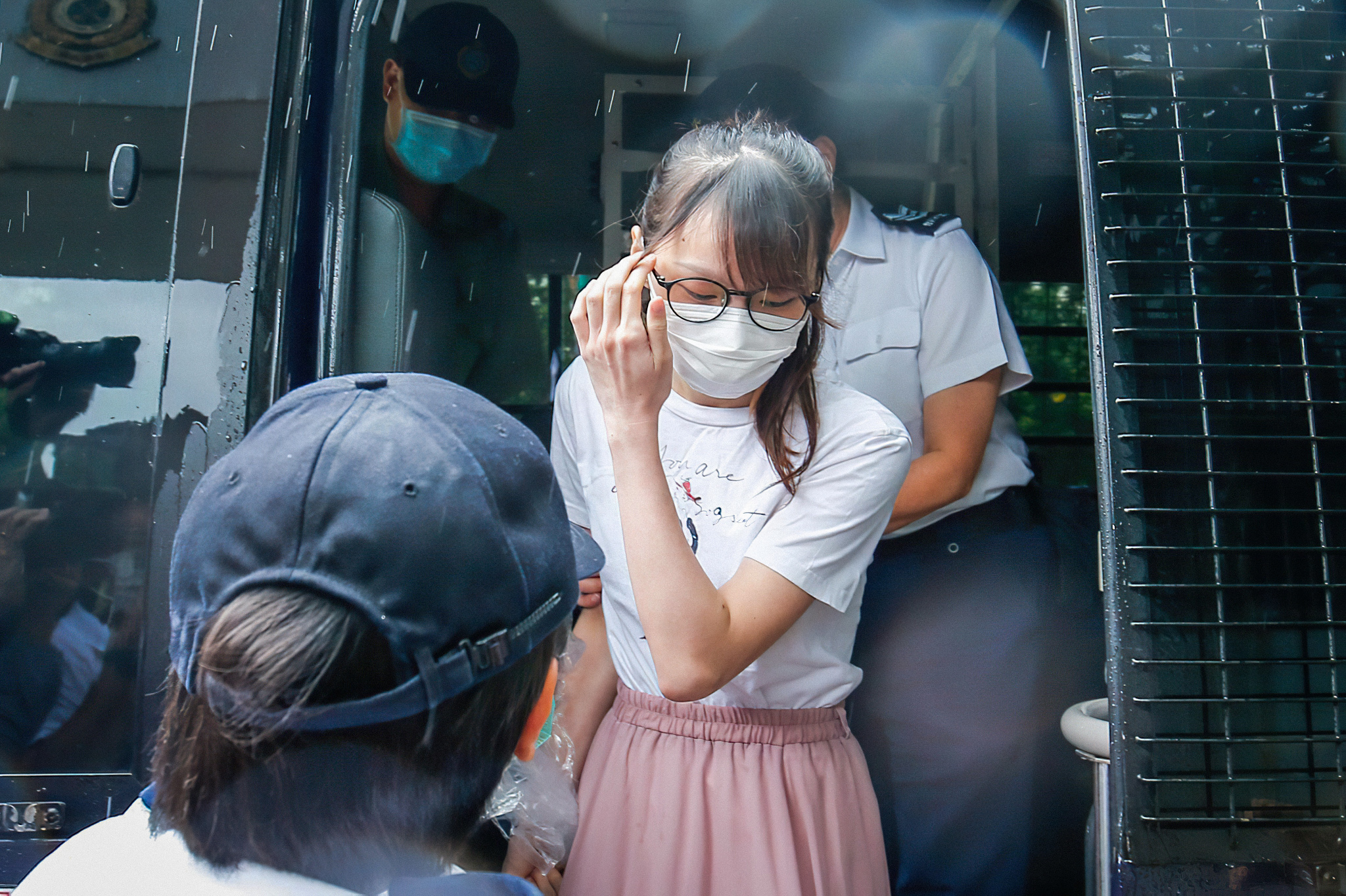
Agnes Chow leaving the prison van after being released from prison

At the sentencing trial, Agnes Chow was sentenced to 10 months in jail. The judge, Magistrate Wong Sze-lai, stated: "The defendants called on protesters to besiege the headquarters and chanted slogans that undermine the police force". The sentencing was condemned by Amnesty International, who stated that the Chinese authorities sent "a warning to anyone who dares to openly criticise the government that they could be next".

She was initially imprisoned at the medium-security Lo Wu Correctional Institution. On 31 December 2020, local media reported that Chow had been transferred to the maximum-security Tai Lam Centre for Women (where she was previously remanded), after she was classified as a Category A prisoner. She has stated this imprisonment left her with PTSD and depression.

On 12 June 2021, Chow was released from prison after serving nearly seven months of her sentence. Authorities did not cite a reason for her early release. Some supporters gathered outside to welcome her dressed in black and with yellow masks, a symbol of the protests, while shouting slogans in Cantonese related to the protests. On 28 June 2021, local Hong Kong media reported that Chow's Facebook profile had been deleted. Chow did not respond to reporter questions on whether she deleted her profile on her own.

==== International responses ====
The sentencing prompted responses from political figures across the world: U.S. Speaker of the House of Representatives Nancy Pelosi and U.S. Senator Marsha Blackburn both issued statements criticizing the decision. Spokespeople for the governments of the United Kingdom, Germany, and Japan also issued statements criticising the decision. For example, UK Foreign Minister Dominic Raab called it a "campaign to stifle opposition" and urged an end.

The Taiwanese Overseas Community Affairs Council (OCAC) issued a statement that "the decision to imprison... Agnes Chow... represents a failure by the Hong Kong government to protect the people's political rights and freedom of speech". Multiple media outlets in Japan have referred to her as the "Goddess of Democracy" (民主の女神, Minshu no Megami) for her role in Hong Kong's pro-democracy movement.

=== National security case ===
Following the enactment of the national security law by the Standing Committee of the National People's Congress (SCNPC), Chow was arrested for a second time on 10 August 2020, reportedly on charges of violating the national security law. The detainment took place amid a mass arrest of various pro-democracy figures on the same day, including media proprietor Jimmy Lai. Chow's arrest sparked a worldwide social media campaign calling for her release, which also prompted statements from Japanese politicians and celebrities. She was released on bail on 11 August 2020, and stated that her arrest was "political persecution and political suppression". She concluded that she still didn't understand why she had been arrested.

=== Exile ===
On 3 December 2023, Chow made a public announcement on Instagram, stating that she had moved to Canada in September 2023 to study for a master's degree at a university in Toronto, Canada. Police had returned her passport after she had agreed to travel on a police-escorted tour to Shenzhen. She also said she had decided to jump bail in her national security case by not returning to Hong Kong later in December to report to police, out of consideration for her personal safety and well-being. Chief Executive John Lee said that police "had offered leniency but in the end they were deceived". Secretary for Security Chris Tang said that "Chow's behavior might affect other arrested suspects who are showing genuine remorse and are earnestly trying to turn over a new leaf." Neither commented on the Shenzhen tour. In July 2025, Chow announced her graduation from the Ontario College of Art & Design University in Toronto with a Master's degree.

== Recognition ==
Due to Chow's pro-democracy activism, she was named to the BBC's 100 Women in 2020, to the Financial Times's 25 most influential women of 2021, and on Forbes Japan's list of the 50 most influential social media accounts in 2019. She appeared in the PBS Frontline documentary Battle for Hong Kong in 2020, focused on pro-democracy activism in Hong Kong.

Party political offices
New title	Deputy Secretary-General of Demosistō; 2016–2017	Succeeded by Chris Kwok
