= Ivan Lam =

Hong Kong politician and social activist (born 1994)

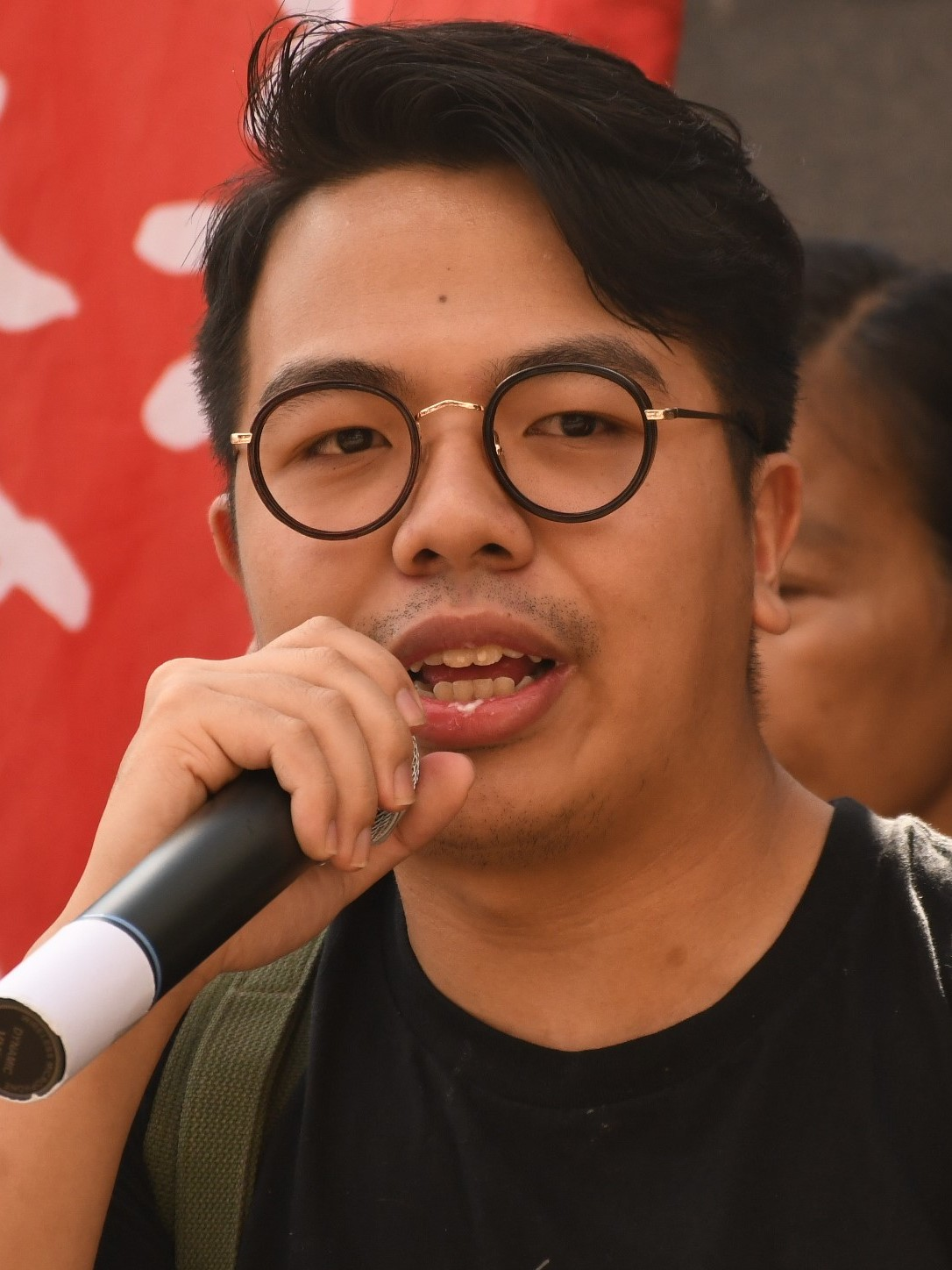
- Lam in 2018

Chairperson of Demosistō
- In office 12 May 2018 – 30 June 2020
- Deputy: Cheng Ka Long
- Secretary general: Joshua Wong
- Preceded by: Nathan Law
- Succeeded by: Party dissolved

Personal details
- Born: Lam Long-yin; 18 July 1994 (age 31) British Hong Kong
- Party: Independent (since 2020)
- Other political affiliations: Scholarism (2011–2016); Demosistō (2016–2020)
Ivan Lam Long-yin
- Traditional Chinese: 林朗彥
- Simplified Chinese: 林朗彦
Transcriptions
Standard Mandarin
- Hanyu Pinyin: Lín Lǎngyàn
Yue: Cantonese
- Jyutping: lam4 long5 jin6

Ivan Lam Long-yin (Chinese: 林朗彥, born 18 July 1994) is a Hong Kong political activist who, together with Joshua Wong, established the Hong Kong student activist group, Scholarism, in May 2011. In 2018, he replaced Nathan Law as the chairperson of Demosisto. In December 2020, Lam was sentenced to seven months in prison for his role during the 2019 protests. Along with him, activists Joshua Wong and Agnes Chow were also convicted. On 12 April 2021, he was released from prison.

On 5 July 2023, Lam was again arrested, along with three others, according to local media. The group was suspected to have provided financial aid to self-exiled activists, and to have published seditious material on social media.
