= Demosisto =

Hong Kong political party

Demosistō 香港眾志
- Chairmen: Nathan Law; Ivan Lam
- Founder: Nathan Law; Joshua Wong; Agnes Chow
- Founded: 10 April 2016
- Dissolved: 30 June 2020
- Preceded by: Scholarism
- Membership (2017): 25
- Ideology: Liberalism; Progressivism; Left-wing localism
- Political position: Centre-left
- Regional affiliation: Pro-democracy camp
- Colours: Turquoise

Demosisto
- Traditional Chinese: 香港眾志
- Simplified Chinese: 香港众志
- Literal meaning: Hong Kong's popular will
Transcriptions
Standard Mandarin
- Hanyu Pinyin: Xiānggǎng zhòng zhì
Yue: Cantonese
- Yale Romanization: Hēung góng jung ji
- Jyutping: Hoeng^{1}gong^{2} zung^{3}zi^{3}

Demosistō (/ˌdɛməˈsɪstoʊ/) was a pro-democracy political organisation established on 10 April 2016 as a political party. It was led by Joshua Wong and Agnes Chow – former leaders of Scholarism, along with Nathan Law, former secretary-general of the Hong Kong Federation of Students (HKFS). Scholarism and the HKFS were the two student activist groups which played an instrumental role in the 79-day occupy protests known as the Umbrella Revolution in 2014.

Demosistō advocated a referendum to determine Hong Kong's sovereignty with the goal of obtaining autonomy after 2047, when the one country, two systems principle as promised in the Sino-British Joint Declaration and the Hong Kong Basic Law is supposed to expire. It won a seat in the 2016 Legislative Council election with its 23-year-old chairman Nathan Law becoming the youngest candidate ever to be elected. In 2017, Law was disqualified from the Legislative Council over the oath-taking controversy and was imprisoned with Joshua Wong for the storming into the Civic Square during the Umbrella Revolution. After a series of disqualification of the Demosistō candidates, the party passed a resolution in January 2020 to abandon its advocacy for "democratic self-determination". After the passing of the Hong Kong national security law, the party's leadership resigned from their offices and the party disbanded on 30 June 2020.

== Beliefs ==
The following were the major missions of Demosistō:

- Development of civil society: Demosistō wants to encourage the people of Hong Kong to discuss their political views and the youth to develop political parties and civic movements.
- Equality and justice, trust of people, pluralist: Demosistō believes in the Hong Kong people and their ability to shape Hong Kong into a pluralist city with the values of justice and equality.
- Fight for democratic legislation to inspire civic movements: Ivan Lam, who succeeded Nathan Law in May 2018 as a chairman, said the group will prepare to fight for democratic legislation in Hong Kong; for example, opposing Article 23 in the Basic Law (a controversial bill in Article 23 caused massive protests in 2003) and the proposed Anthem bill regarding the anthem of the People's Republic of China. In the same month, Demosistō changed their legal status from political party to political organisation, when its candidates were banned on election in the Legislative Council of Hong Kong.

== Background ==
The name "Demosistō" is derived from the Greek "demos" ("δῆμος", meaning "people", from which the English word "democracy" is derived) and Latin "sisto" (meaning "to stand", from which English words such as "insist", "persist" and "resist" are derived). Literally translated as "people to stand" in English, it means "stand for democracy", or "stand for the people". The Chinese name means "the will of the people".

The idea of forming Demosistō was inspired by Taiwan's New Power Party which was formed by the Sunflower Movement leaders and fared well in the 2016 Taiwanese legislative election. In February 2016, core figures of the student activist group Scholarism – Joshua Wong, Oscar Lai and Agnes Chow – who played an instrumental role in the 2014 Hong Kong protests, announced their plan of forming a new political party with other Umbrella Movement leaders, including Nathan Law, former secretary-general of the Hong Kong Federation of Students (HKFS), to run in the September Legislative Council election. Scholarism officially ceased functioning on 20 March 2016 as the group disallowed any party affiliation.

== History ==
=== Founding ===
The party was officially established on 10 April 2016 with former secretary-general of Hong Kong Federation of Students Nathan Law as chairman, former spokesman of Scholarism Oscar Lai as vice-chairman, former convenor as Joshua Wong as secretary-general and former core member Agnes Chow Ting as deputy secretary. Founding party members included Shu Kei, Dean of Film and Television at the Hong Kong Academy for Performing Arts as party's executive committee member, teacher Ng Mei-lan and Hong Kong Unison's Fermi Wong Wai-fun as member of the Kowloon East team.

The Company Registry and police have yet to allow them to register as a company or society, as the registry had asked Demosistō to explain if it adheres to the Basic Law in pushing for Hong Kong's "self-determination" when the then-political party tried to register as a company. It was thus unable to set up its own bank account to raise funds as other parties and organisations did and had to rely instead on individual members' personal accounts. Joshua Wong also accused HSBC of exercising "political censorship" in rejecting his request to open a joint savings account to handle the business of his political party.

=== 2016 Legislative Council election ===
Demosistō initially planned to field chairman Nathan Law in Hong Kong Island and vice-chairman Oscar Lai in Kowloon East. In July 2016, Oscar Lai decided to drop his candidacy in Kowloon East due to the lack of funding. The mailings of the campaign pamphlets of chairman Nathan Law, who was running in Hong Kong Island, were also delayed as the Hongkong Post had to seek legal advice from the justice department regarding Law's pamphlets mentioning phrases such as "self-determination". Law, 23, eventually became the youngest candidate ever to be elected to the Legislative Council after he received 50,818 votes, the second-highest among all candidates in the constituency. Demosistō's electoral allies, environmentalist Eddie Chu and university lecturer Lau Siu-lai who ran with a similar platform of "self-determination" also won seats in New Territories West and Kowloon West.

In the Legislative Council, Demosistō and its allies joined the 27-strong pro-democracy caucus. In the 2017 Chief Executive election, the party and other radical democrats backed the League of Social Democrats legislator Leung Kwok-hung to run against the two former government officials Carrie Lam and John Tsang, who was backed by the mainstream pro-democrats. Leung later dropped out after failing to grab enough signatures in an unofficial civil petition.

=== Disqualifications and imprisonment of members ===
In July 2017, Nathan Law was ousted from the Legislative Council over their manners at the oath-taking ceremony at the inaugural meeting with three other pro-democracy legislators, Leung Kwok-hung, Lau Siu-lai and Yiu Chung-yim, losing the party's only elected representation. The controversy, triggered by two pro-independence legislators, Sixtus Leung and Yau Wai-ching of Youngspiration resulted in the unprecedented legal actions by the government against elected legislators and the controversial interpretation of the Basic Law of the Standing Committee of the National People's Congress (NPCSC) which led to the disqualification of the six legislators as a result.

On 17 August 2017, Nathan Law and Joshua Wong, the chairman and the secretary-general of Demosistō, were imprisoned alongside former general secretary of the Hong Kong Federation of Students Alex Chow for their storming into the Civic Square which triggered the 79-day 2014 Hong Kong protests.

Agnes Chow, core member of Demosistō, announced her candidacy for the seat left vacant by Nathan Law in the 2018 Hong Kong Island by-election. However, her candidacy was disqualified by the Electoral Affairs Commission of the basis that she "cannot possibly comply with the requirements of the relevant electoral laws, since advocating or promoting 'self-determination' is contrary to the content of the declaration that the law requires a candidate to make to uphold the Basic Law and pledge allegiance to the [Hong Kong Special Administrative Region]."

In the 2019 District Council election, Demosistō secretary-general Joshua Wong, who planned to run for the South Horizons West constituency, received letters from Returning Officers asking if he was running on behalf of his party Demosistō and if he supported the notion of "self-determination" for Hong Kong. More than ten days after the nomination period, acting Returning Officer Laura Liang Aron, who replaced Dorothy Ma Chau Pui-fun who took indefinite sick leave, barred Joshua Wong from running due to political reasons, making Wong the only pro-democrat to be disqualified due to his political stance in the election. Aron issued a six-page ruling noting that Wong dropped his advocacy of the option of independence as "a compromise, instead of a genuine intention" as Wong referred to CCP general secretary Xi Jinping's remarks on separatism as a "stern threat" and reason for him and Demosistō to give up the advocacy of independence. Wong said the Returning Officer's decision showed that the central government was rigging the election, which was expected to be a key test of public sentiment about the protest movement.

=== Property report ===
In April 2020, Demosistō published a report on property ownership by the Hong Kong Liaison Office. The report found more than 700 apartment units, along with other previously unreported property.

=== Abandoning "self-determination" advocacy and dissolution ===
After a series of disqualification of the Demosistō candidates, the party passed a resolution in January 2020 to abandon its advocacy for "democratic self-determination" on its platform, replacing with "democratic and progressive values".

On 30 June 2020, hours after the National People's Congress passed the Hong Kong national security law, secretary-general Joshua Wong, Agnes Chow, Jeffrey Ngo and former chairman Nathan Law announced they were withdrawing from Demosistō. Shortly after, the party announced it would disband, effective immediately.

== Leadership ==
=== Chairperson ===
- Nathan Law, 2016–2018
- Ivan Lam, 2018–2020

=== Vice-Chairperson ===
- Oscar Lai, 2016–2017
- Tiffany Yuen, 2017–2018
- Issac Cheng, 2019–2020

=== Secretaries-General ===
- Joshua Wong, 2016–2020

=== Deputy Secretaries-General ===
- Agnes Chow, 2016–2020
- Kwok Hei-yiu, 2017–2018
- Chan Kok-hin, 2018–2020

== Electoral performance ==
=== Legislative Council elections ===
Election	Number of popular votes	% of popular votes	GC seats	FC seats	Total seats	+/−	Position
2016	50,818	2.34	1	0	1 / 70	1 ▲	10th
