= 2010 Hong Kong democracy protests =

Pro-democracy protests in 2010 in Hong Kong

The 2010 Hong Kong democracy protests were a series of protests sparked by the 2010 electoral reform and the arrest of a high-profile Chinese activist, Liu Xiaobo. The protests reflected the growing force of the pro-democracy movement in the region, and can be seen as a precursor to the events of the 2014 Umbrella Revolution.

== Historical context ==
=== The Basic Law ===
Hong Kong, as a former British colony, was reunified with mainland China in 1997 under the system of "One country, two systems". While originally a concept with no legal power, a committee consisting of 59 members from different backgrounds and industries joined together after the signing of Sino-British Joint Declaration to create the basic laws of the new Hong Kong under China based on the ideas stipulated in the Declaration and thus gave national legitimacy to the concept. Effective 1 July 1997, Hong Kong was to be treated as fully autonomous from mainland China. This is followed in the Declaration by the promise that "[Hong Kong] will remain unchanged for 50 years", until 2047.

=== Democracy in Hong Kong ===
At the time, Hong Kong's chief executive was chosen by an 800-member committee, while its legislature of 60 is half elected and half chosen by interest groups called functional constituencies. Although a democratic style of government election is promised in Hong Kong's constitution, China ruled in 2007 that Hong Kong could not directly elect a leader until 2017 and its legislature until 2020.

== Events ==
=== New Year protest ===
According to figures from the Hong Kong police, 9,000 people marched to Beijing's representative office. Organisers claimed that more than 30,000 protesters turned up to reignite the democracy movement at times when locals were preoccupied with economic issues. A diverse group of organisations joined the march but largely aligned themselves with three headline causes: 'true' universal suffrage, abolition of the small-circle functional constituencies, and freedom for Chinese dissident Liu Xiabo. The exception was protesters opposing the location of a Hong Kong connection to the Mainland's national high-speed rail network through a New Territories village. Protesters carried out colourful banners such as "Democracy Now!" Some demonstrators held aloft portraits of Liu Xiaobo, demanding the release of the prominent writer and activist. Hundreds of police erected steel barricades and with minor scuffles when they tried to prevent a small number of protesters from storming the office. New year marches are a fixture on the political calendar in Hong Kong.

=== 2 May protest ===
More than 3000 people marched from Victoria Park to the Central Government Offices to demand full democracy in Hong Kong in the 2 May Protest. In January 2010, the Five Constituencies Referendum triggered a by-election when five pan-democrats stepped down. The protest happened a couple of weeks before the scheduled by-election on 16 May 2010, during which few politicians tried to turn it into a referendum on political reform that unsurprisingly failed.

=== 1 July protest ===
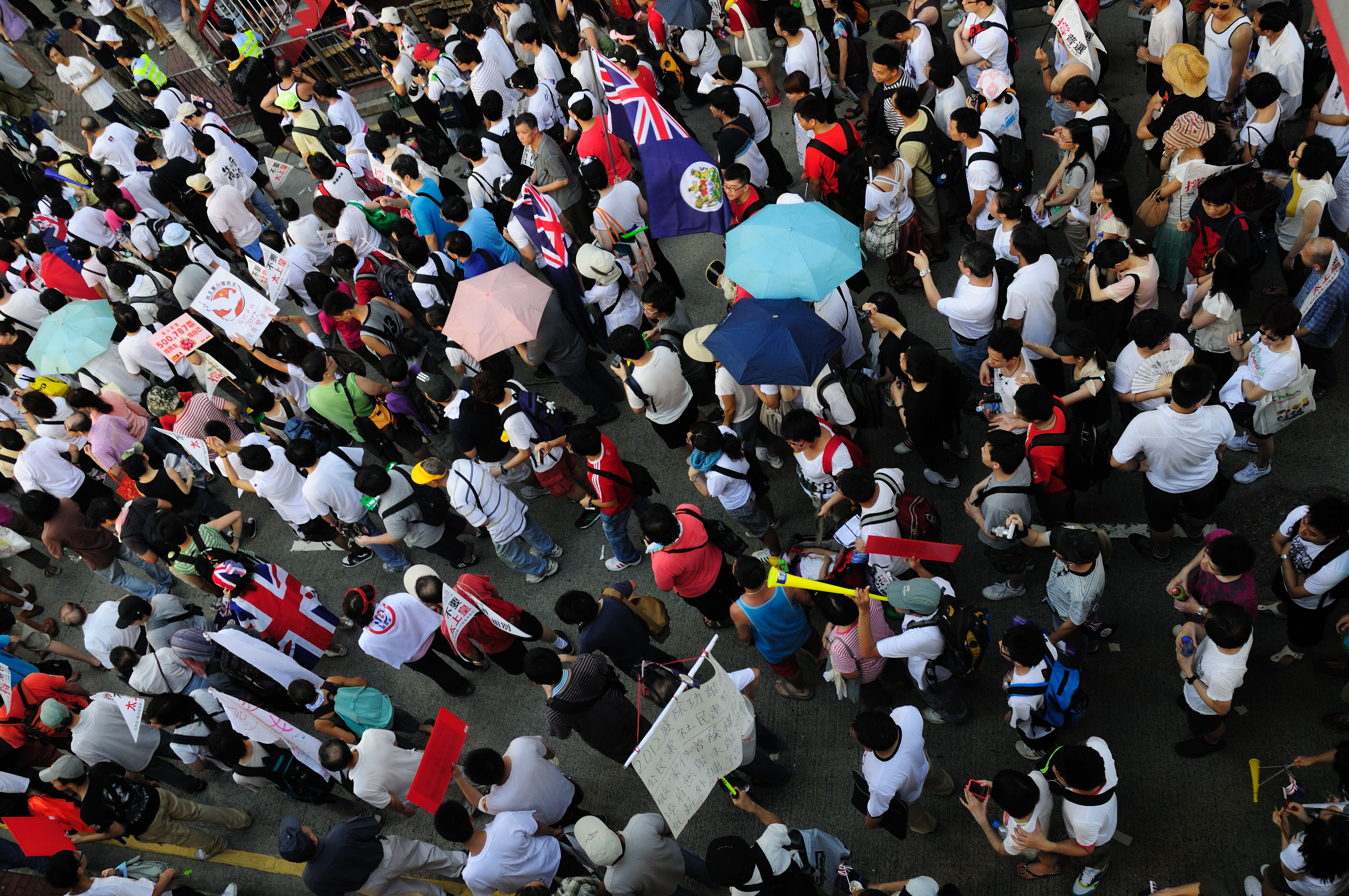
Hong Kong July 1 protest

1 July protests are annual protest rallies originally held by the Civil Human Rights Front. The holiday commemorates the day of handover from the United Kingdom to China in 1997 and the establishment of the Hong Kong Special Administrative Region. The 1 July march in 2010 was the first public march for democracy in Hong Kong after the unprecedented acceptance by Beijing of a limited democratic reform proposal by the Democratic Party under a document titled the 'Consultation Document on the Methods for Selecting the Chief Executive and for Forming the LegCo in 2012'. While this was seen by a step forward for Hong Kong, many were disappointed in the pan-democracy camp for going back on their word to settle for something less than pure universal suffrage. As a result, approximately 52,000 people took part in the protest. An anniversary parade was organised by opposition pro-government groups, attended by 2000 people. Several hundred democratic party members faced verbal abuse and chants such as "shame on you" and "you betrayed Hong Kong's people" throughout the march to the Hong Kong government headquarters for selling out to Beijing.

=== League of Social Democrats and the Civic Party resignation ===
In 10 January, five legislators from the Civic Party and the League of Social Democrats, one from each of Hong Kong's electoral districts resigned their seats as a part of the ‘Five Constituencies Resignation’ concept for meaningful political reform. Albert Chan, Alan Leong, Tanya Chan, "Longhair" Leung Kwok-hung, and Wong Yuk-man resigned from the Legislative Council of Hong Kong. The intention was to trigger by-elections by pitting pro-democracy candidates against pro-China ones in hopes for a de facto referendum on full democracy. However, the Basic Law of Hong Kong does not provide for official referendums. Their resignations were submitted on 26 January 2010, with effect on 29 January 2010. They resigned in spite of Beijing warning them not to, Chief Executive Donald Tsang claimed that the "so-called referendum" had no legal grounding. The by-elections were nevertheless held on 16 May 2010. Following a boycott by the pro-government parties, the five who resigned were returned to the Legislative Council by voters. The by-election was criticised as a waste of taxpayers’ money.

== Causes ==
=== Arrest of Liu Xiaobo ===
Protesters called for the release of the Chinese activist Liu Xiaobo, who was detained on 8 December 2008. He was formally arrested and sentenced to eleven years of imprisonment and two years’ deprivation of political rights on 25 December 2009 for "inciting subversion of state power" in the manifesto he co-authored, Charter 08.

=== Electoral reform package ===
The Central Government unveiled a package of electoral reforms, calling for 10 new seats in the legislature from 60 to 70 of which 40 will be directly elected, the first time a majority of seats will be determined by popular vote. It also called for an extra 400 people to be added to the 800-member committee that nominates and elects the Chief Executive. The bill requires a vote of 40, or a two-thirds majority threshold to pass. Hong Kong's Legislative Council passed the bill on 25 June 2010 with 46 lawmakers, including moderates, in favour. 12 others, including members from the League of Social Democrats and all five members of the Civic Party, voted against it. Opponents view that the bill does not go far enough and does not set any concrete roadmap for Hong Kong's universal suffrage, leaving uncertainty. The pan-democracy camp attacked the conservative proposals as a rehash of those already rejected in 2005, but the Hong Kong government under Donald Tsang said its proposals were "more democratic", and could not exceed what was authorised by Beijing. The pan-democratic party was split when The Democratic Party opted to vote with the Beijing government, parting company with the Civic Party and the League of Social Democrats. The Chief Executive assented on 29 June 2010, and China's parliament ratified the decision on 28 August. It was the first time Hong Kong's legislature had passed major reforms to electoral arrangements since the city reverted from British to Chinese rule in 1997. A previous attempt in 2005 was voted down by opposition democrats.

== Reactions ==
=== Mainland reaction ===
Beijing was wary of upsurges of public discontent in Hong Kong. The Chinese government did not immediately comment after the resignation of five legislators, but it criticised the resignation plan in a statement afterwards, calling it a challenge to authority.

== See also ==
- December 2005 protest for democracy in Hong Kong
- 2012 Dual Universal Suffrage (Hong Kong)
- 2014 Hong Kong protests
- 2016 Mong Kok civil unrest
- 2019–20 Hong Kong protests
- Politics of Hong Kong
- Elections in Hong Kong
- Democratic development in Hong Kong
