= Eddie Chu =

Hong Kong activist and politician (born 1977)

Eddie Chu Hoi-dick
- 朱凱廸
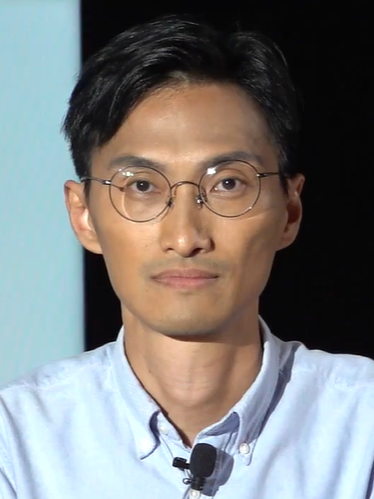
- Chu in 2020 pro-democracy primaries

Member of the Legislative Council
- In office 1 October 2016 – 30 September 2020
- Preceded by: Tam Yiu-chung
- Succeeded by: Constituency abolished
- Constituency: New Territories West

Personal details
- Born: 29 September 1977 (age 49) Hong Kong
- Party: Team Chu Hoi-dick of New Territories West (2016–2021)
- Spouse: Au Pui-fun (m. 2010)
- Children: 1
- Education: Chinese University of Hong Kong Tehran University
- Alma mater: Shaw College, CUHK (BA)
- Occupation: Community organiser

Eddie Chu Hoi-dick
- Traditional Chinese: 朱凱廸
- Simplified Chinese: 朱凯廸
Transcriptions
Standard Mandarin
- Hanyu Pinyin: Zhū Kǎidí
Yue: Cantonese
- Yale Romanization: Jyū Hói dihk
- Jyutping: Zyu^{1} Hoi^{2} dik^{6}

Eddie Chu Hoi-dick (Chinese: 朱凱廸; born 29 September 1977) is a Hong Kong social activist and politician. He is a member of the Local Action and founder of the Land Justice League which are involved in conservation and environmental movements. He is known for his actions against the demolition of the Edinburgh Place Ferry Pier and Queen's Pier in 2006 and 2007 and Choi Yuen Tsuen in 2009 and 2010. He was elected to the Legislative Council of Hong Kong in the 2016 Hong Kong Legislative Council election in New Territories West. He resigned from the Legislative Council on 28 September 2020, citing that he would not serve in an "appointed legislature" after Beijing had extended the legislators' terms by a year.

== Social activism ==
Chu was born in Hong Kong in 1977 and was educated at the Chinese University of Hong Kong. After his graduation in 1999, he studied Persian language at the Tehran University in Iran and worked as an editor and reporter, covering news in several Persian-speaking countries after he returned to Hong Kong.

Chu became involved in cultural conservation and environmental issues and founded an activist group called Local Action. In 2006, he was one of the leaders to launch a campaign against the government's decision to demolish the Edinburgh Place Ferry Pier for the Star Ferry and the Queen's Pier to make way for the land reclamation project. He camped inside the pier with other protesters and filed a judicial review with another environmentalist Ho Loy against the decision of the then Secretary for Home Affairs of 22 May 2007 not to declare the Queen's Pier a monument under the Antiquities and Monuments Ordinance (Cap 53). The Court of First Instance dismissed the judicial review application on 10 August 2007.

In early 2009, he formed the Choi Yuen Tsuen Support Group to support the villagers who were forced to relocate due to the construction of the Guangzhou–Shenzhen–Hong Kong Express Rail Link (XRL). The movement grew into a massive protest in late 2009 and early 2010. After the proposal was passed by the Legislative Council in a controversial manner despite the protesters sieged the Legislative Council Building, Chu helped the villagers to rebuild a new eco-village.

In mid 2011, he took part in setting up the Land Justice League, a community movement organisation. He engaged in grassroots work in Pat Heung and San Tin. He opposed the government's proposal of the North East New Territories New Development Areas. He was also involved in a "Going Local" campaign to preserve farmland and develop a sustainable communal economy in the New Territories.

He ran in the 2011 District Council election in Pat Heung North, a constituency tightly controlled by the rural force. He ran again in 2015 District Council election in Pat Heung South under the banner of Urban-Rural Link, a campaign launched by the trio to promote green living and sustainable development. Despite his loss, Chu increased his votes from 283 to 1,482.

On 29 March 2019, Chu lodged an inquiry to various local authorities, urging them to take the necessary steps to incorporate the Lok Ma Chau Loop into one of the 18 districts of Hong Kong (most likely to be a part of North District or Yuen Long District). Currently, the Lok Ma Chau Loop is the only unincorporated area in Hong Kong.

== Legislative Councillor ==
=== Candidacy ===
In 2016, he and like-minded, Demosisto's Nathan Law and Democracy Groundwork's Lau Siu-lai, contested in the Legislative Council election, where he ran in the New Territories West. He received the highest votes in the geographical constituencies by winning 84,121 votes without any party backing, leading the first runner-up, New People's Party's Michael Tien by about 13,000 votes.

During the campaign, Chu took on the Heung Yee Kuk over its land rights, drawing public attention to the long-time allegations of collusion between the government, business, landlords and triads behind the Wang Chau housing project, which made the government to scale down the housing project from 17,000 flats to only 4,000 due to the pressure from the powerful rural leader Tsang Shu-wo who owned the brownfield land in Wang Chau. After the election, Chu was placed under round-the-clock police protection when he reported receiving death threats against him and his family. The incident escalated into a political crisis in the following weeks as the government was questioned over the alleged collusion.

=== Tenure as Legislative Councillor ===
In the Legislative Council, Chu initially joined the 27-strong pro-democrats' caucus with Nathan Law and Lau Siu-lai but soon quit the caucus. In the 2017 Chief Executive election, he supported legislator Leung Kwok-hung of the League of Social Democrats (LSD) to run for the Chief Executive through an unofficial civil petition, despite the mainstream pro-democrats backed former Financial Secretary John Tsang.

Chu was criticised for his remarks in the pro-democracy primary of the 2018 Legislative Council by-election. He had commented on Facebook warning the chance of veteran politician Frederick Fung, who became a backup candidate after losing to Chu-supported Yiu Chung-yim in the pro-democracy primary in case of Yiu's candidacy was disqualified, winning as voters might refuse to vote for him and therefore the camp should not blindly abide by the backup agreement. Fung later on announced his withdrawal as a backup candidacy, stating that he was under pressure. "Someone from the progressive democracy bloc told me that if I ran in the poll, they would definitely send someone as well [to challenge me],” Fung said. Chu denied he had been the one pressuring Fung to withdraw. Chu was also held responsible after Yiu who was believed to be largely dependent on Chu's campaign strategy, was narrowly defeated in the by-election.

==== Disqualifications from village election candidacy (Autumn 2018) ====
In November 2018 Kowloon West by-election, Lau Siu-lai, Chu's ally who signed a joint declaration advocating Hong Kong people's right to determination, was banning from running in the election based on her "pro-independence stance" as Hong Kong independence was one of the options in self-determination. It was widely speculated that Chu, who also signed the same declaration would also be barred from running in the re-election.

In the same month Chu ran for the Village Representative election in Yuen Long. He was asked by Returning Officer Enoch Yuen if he agreed to uphold the Basic Law, agreed to recognise China's sovereignty over Hong Kong, and whether he supported Hong Kong independence. Chu restated his position that he has never supported Hong Kong independence: "I advocate and support the democratisation of the Basic Law and the political system – including but not limited to amending Article 158 and 159 of the Basic Law – as a goal of Hong Kongers’ self-determination after the Central Government blocked universal suffrage."

On 2 December, Chu was told that his candidacy was invalid, making him the tenth candidate barred from running in the election for his political belief and the first banned from running in the village-level election.

==== Repeated ejections (May–June 2020) ====
The pro-democracy camp had successfully been filibustering the passage of the National Anthem Bill since October 2019, but their success was drawing to an end in May 2020.

On 8 May 2020, scuffles broke out in the Legislative Council (LegCo) as pro-establishment and pro-democracy lawmakers were vying for the empty seat of the house committee chair. Chu was trying to reach the seat through climbing a wall. He was removed by four security guards.

On 18 May, Chu was involved in a further scuffle that resulted in his forcible removal from the LegCo chamber. The incident started when a group of representatives from the PDC attempted to break through a ring of security guards around member Chan Kin-por who, pursuant to his appointment from a week earlier, had taken the chairperson seat to prepare the election of the chairperson of the Legislative Council House Committee. Following the removal or boycott of most PDC members, the regular business of the council resumed, with Starry Lee being elected chairwoman of the house committee. Chu said of the incident that "If Hong Kong was a democracy, we would not need to start scuffles like this", but that he "can foresee more fights within the chamber and outside the chamber."

On 28 May, during the second day of debate on the National Anthem Bill, Chu was ordered to leave the chamber on orders of President Andrew Leung for displaying a placard that was seen as mocking LegCo chairwoman Starry Lee. Chu's initial refusal to leave caused a delay in LegCo proceedings for about an hour. After the meeting resumed, fellow lawmaker Raymond Chan walked away from his seat to protest against the ejection of Chu, for which he was ordered by Leung to leave and later taken away by security guards.

On 4 June, in an attempt to disrupt the third reading of the National Anthem Bill at the Legislative Council, Chu and fellow lawmaker, Raymond Chan, attempted to disperse pungent liquid towards the President of the Legislative Council, Andrew Leung. They were stopped before they could have reached the rostrum; Chan dropped the liquid and a lantern on the floor. The meeting was paused for four hours as a result. On 16 June, LegCo president Leung announced that Chu and Chan would be fined roughly HK$100,000 each for their actions. Chu declared the same day that he and Chan would examine and possibly challenge the decision. On 12 March, Chu pleaded guilty to contempt over the liquid spill incident, besides pleading guilty for his role in a clash in the Legislative Council on 11 May 2019, and was sentenced to 14 days in prison.

=== Resignation ===
Chu resigned from the Legislative Council on 28 September 2020, citing that he would not serve in an "appointed legislature". Prior to his resignation, the Legislative Council term had been extended, upon authorization by the central government on request of the Hong Kong government, by a year in order to resolve the limbo that had been created by the postponement of the legislative election.

== Arrests ==
Chu was arrested on 1 November 2020, along with six other democrats, in connection with the melee that had broken out in the LegCo on 8 May 2020. On that day, Starry Lee, the incumbent chair of the House Committee of the Legislative Council, had attempted to commence a meeting of the committee after extended stalling tactics of the pan-democratic camp over the previous months.

On 8 December 2020, Chu was arrested for his alleged organization and participation in the unauthorized 1 July march that year. Seven other democrats were arrested the same day on charges relating to the same march.

On 6 January 2021, Chu was among 53 members of the pro-democratic camp who were arrested under the national security law, specifically its provision regarding alleged subversion. The group stood accused of the organisation of and participation in unofficial primary elections held by the camp in July 2020. Chu was released on bail on 7 January. Prior to the arrests, on 20 May 2021, he disbanded his team of New Territories West.

Chu was released from Stanley Prison on 15 January 2026 after serving four and a half years. Among the forty-five convicted of the Hong Kong 47, he was the fifteenth to be released.

== Personal life ==
Chu married his former colleague Au Pui-fun from the media industry in 2010. The couple have a daughter, Chu Puk-tsin (朱不遷), whose personal name literally means "not relocating", in commemoration his activism against the relocation of Choi Yuen Tsuen.

== See also ==
- Hong Kong Express Rail Link controversy
- Wang Chau housing controversy

Legislative Council of Hong Kong
Preceded by Tam Yiu-chung	Member of Legislative Council; Representative for New Territories West; 2016–2020	Constituency abolished
