= Wing Ning Tsuen =

Wing Ning Tsuen (Chinese: 永寧村) is the name of two villages in Hong Kong:

- Wing Ning Tsuen, North District, in the Lung Yeuk Tau area
- Wing Ning Tsuen, Yuen Long District, in the Wang Chau area
