= Pat Heung South (constituency) =

Hong Kong constituency

- Elected constituency for the Yuen Long District Council
- Boundary of Pat Heung South in Yuen Long District
- District: Yuen Long
- Legislative Council constituency: New Territories North West
- Population: 20,545 (2019)
- Electorate: 10,096 (2019)

Current constituency
- Created: 1999
- Number of members: One
- Member: Lai Wing-tim (Independent)
- Created from: Pat Heung

Pat Heung South is one of the 31 constituencies in the Yuen Long District of Hong Kong.

The constituency returns one district councillor to the Yuen Long District Council, with an election every four years.

Pat Heung South constituency is loosely based on southern part of Pat Heung with estimated population of 20,545.

== Councillors represented ==
Election	Member	Party
1999	Tsang Hin-keung	Independent
2003	Lai Wai-hung	Independent
2019	Lai Wing-tim	Independent

== Election results ==
=== 2010s ===
Yuen Long District Council Election, 2019: Pat Heung South
Party	Candidate	Votes	%	±%
Nonpartisan	Lai Wing-tim	3,799	52.22	
Team Chu (PfD)	Eddie Chu Hoi-dick	3,435	47.22	+13.22
Team Chu	Jo Chui Cheuk-yin	41	0.56	
Majority		364	5.00	
Turnout		7,294	72.30	
Nonpartisan gain from Independent		Swing		

Yuen Long District Council Election, 2015: Pat Heung South
Party	Candidate	Votes	%	±%
Independent	Lai Wai-hung	2,872	66.0	−12.2
Land Justice League	Eddie Chu Hoi-dick	1,482	34.0	+12.2
Majority		1,390	32.0	–24.4
Turnout		4,354	47.5	−8.9
Independent hold		Swing	−12.2	

Yuen Long District Council Election, 2011: Pat Heung South
Party	Candidate	Votes	%	±%
Independent	Lai Wai-hung	2,747	78.2	+14.3
Land Justice League	Fancy Fu Yu-chuk	767	21.8	
Majority		1,980	56.4	+30.6
Independent hold		Swing		

=== 2000s ===
Yuen Long District Council Election, 2007: Pat Heung South
Party	Candidate	Votes	%	±%
Independent	Lai Wai-hung	2,447	63.9	+2.9
Liberal	Kan Yuk-man	1,382	36.1	
Majority		1,065	25.8	
Independent hold		Swing		

Yuen Long District Council Election, 2003: Pat Heung South
Party	Candidate	Votes	%	±%
Independent	Lai Wai-hung	1,772	61.0	+11.9
Independent	Ricky Fung Ka-cheung	1,135	39.0	
Independent gain from Independent		Swing		

=== 1990s ===
Yuen Long District Council Election, 1999: Pat Heung South
Party	Candidate	Votes	%	±%
Independent	Tsang Hin-keung	1,389	50.9	
Independent	Lai Wai-hung	1,341	49.1	
Independent win (new seat)				
