= Pat Heung North (constituency) =

Hong Kong constituency

- Elected constituency for the Yuen Long District Council
- Boundary of Pat Heung North in Yuen Long District
- District: Yuen Long
- Legislative Council constituency: New Territories North West
- Population: 13,491 (2019)
- Electorate: 7,818 (2019)

Current constituency
- Created: 1999
- Number of members: One
- Member: Ronnie Tang (Independent)
- Created from: Pat Heung

Pat Heung North is one of the 39 constituencies in the Yuen Long District of Hong Kong.

The constituency returns one district councillor to the Yuen Long District Council, with an election every four years.

Pat Heung North constituency is loosely based on northern part of Pat Heung with estimated population of 13,491.

== Councillors represented ==
Election	Member	Party
1999	Tang Ki-tat	Independent
2003	Tang Kwai-yau	Independent
2015	Ronnie Tang Yung-yiu	Independent

== Election results ==
=== 2010s ===
Yuen Long District Council Election, 2019: Pat Heung North
Party	Candidate	Votes	%	±%
Nonpartisan	Ronnie Tang Yung-yiu	1,848	34.19	−20.91
Nonpartisan	Lee Kan-ming	1,833	33.91	
Nonpartisan	Tang Chi-kwong	1,724	31.90	−13.00
Majority		15	0.28	
Turnout		5,432	69.51	
Nonpartisan hold		Swing		

Yuen Long District Council Election, 2015: Pat Heung North
Party	Candidate	Votes	%	±%
Independent	Ronnie Tang Yung-yiu	1,806	55.1	+11.2
Independent	Tang Chi-kwong	1,471	44.9	
Majority		335	10.2	+7.3
Turnout		3,277	53.7	
Independent gain from Independent		Swing		

Yuen Long District Council Election, 2011: Pat Heung North
Party	Candidate	Votes	%	±%
Independent	Tang Kwai-yau	1,439	46.8	–45.0
Independent	Ronnie Tang Yung-yiu	1,350	43.9	
Land Justice League	Eddie Chu Hoi-dick	283	9.2	+1.0
Majority		89	2.9	
Independent hold		Swing		

=== 2000s ===
Yuen Long District Council Election, 2007: Pat Heung North
Party	Candidate	Votes	%	±%
Independent	Tang Kwai-yau	1,769	91.8	
Democratic Alliance	Shermond Kam Tin-shing	158	8.2	
Majority		1,611	83.6	
Independent hold		Swing		

Yuen Long District Council Election, 2003: Pat Heung North
Party	Candidate	Votes	%	±%
Independent	Tang Kwai-yau	uncontested		
Independent gain from Independent		Swing		

=== 1990s ===
Yuen Long District Council Election, 1999: Pat Heung North
Party	Candidate	Votes	%	±%
Independent	Tang Ki-tat	946	52.9	
Independent	Tang Yat-kau	842	47.1	
Independent win (new seat)				
