= December 2005 protest for democracy in Hong Kong =

Part of the Hong Kong electoral reform

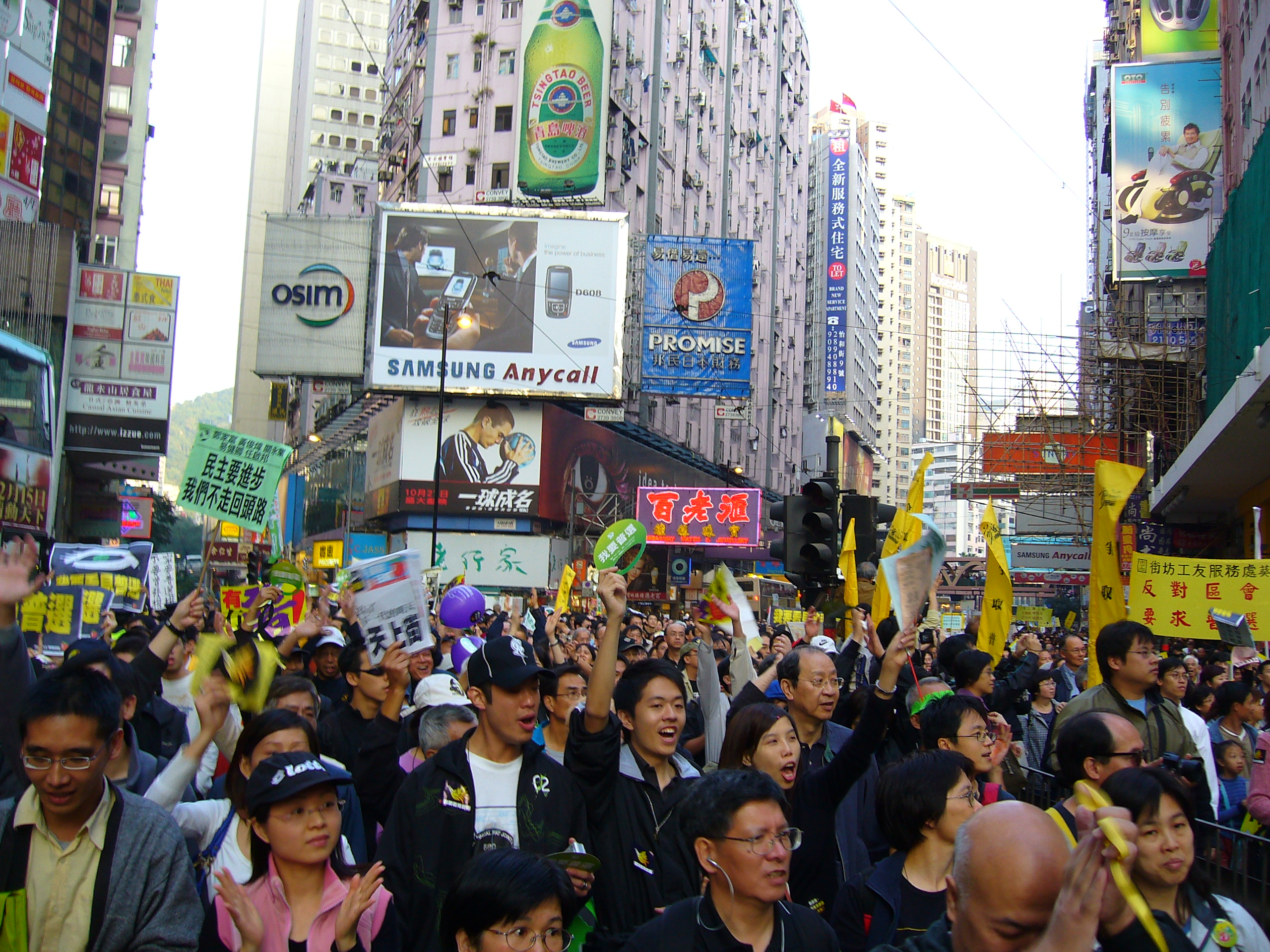
Protesters passing Yee Wo Street in Causeway Bay.

On 4 December 2005, tens of thousands of people in Hong Kong protested for democracy and called on the Government to allow universal and equal suffrage. The protesters demanded the right to directly elect the Chief Executive and all the seats of the Legislative Council. They also urged the government to abolish the appointed seats of the district councils, in response to the limitations of the government's reform proposal.

Organised by the Civil Human Rights Front and pro-democracy lawmakers, the protest began at the football pitches in the Victoria Park. The march, from the park towards the Central Government Offices in Central, started at 3 p.m.

There were several estimates of the crowd turnout ranging from 63,000 to over 250,000 (see the section Controversy over turnout below).

== Background ==
The protest was organised by the Civil Human Rights Front and pro-democracy lawmakers of the territory, to oppose the electoral reform as proposed by Chief Executive Donald Tsang, and to demand the implementation of universal and equal suffrage in Hong Kong. The theme colour for the march was black.

Under the current system, the Chief Executive is selected by an 800-member Election Committee, consisting of members (electors) as elected from respective sectors, mainly representing business and professional interests. Only half of the sixty members of the Legislative Council are directly elected by the public, with the rest representing different sectors of the community, mainly business and professionals.

In his reform package, revealed in the Constitutional Development Task Force Report No.5 that was widely considered to be backed by Beijing, Tsang proposed to double the number of electors to the Chief Executive election of 2007 to 1600 members and add ten seats to the Legislative Council (to seventy seats). The former would enable all members of district councils, including appointed ones, to be member of the Election Committee and the latter would increase the number of seats elected through geographical and functional constituencies by five each. However, the proposal did not include a clear timetable for universal and equal suffrage, and many doubt it helps to make any meaningful progress in democracy.

See also:

- Democratisation in Hong Kong
- 2004 Hong Kong legislative election

== Remarks on the march ==
Most of the participants in the march comprised ordinary Hong Kong residents with mainstream social and political views. Notable remarks by individuals from the business, social or political elite of Hong Kong included the following.

- Gordon Wu, chairman of property developers Hopewell Holdings Ltd, criticised marchers by stating that deciding reform proposals through demonstrations reflect mobocracy rather than the rule of law.
- Stanley Ho, gambling magnate in Macau, estimated four days prior to the demonstration that the number of participants would be no more than 50,000. According to Ho, Hong Kong is "not ready" for democracy as most Hongkongers "do not know much about politics". By way of support of this view Ho indicated that he had not himself received political education in Hong Kong between kindergarten and university.
- Anson Chan, the former Chief Secretary participated in the march and criticised both the Hong Kong government and Beijing for the lack of real democratic reform.

== Controversy over turnout ==
As in the annual vigil in memory of the 1989 Tiananmen Square Massacre, the 1 July marches, and other public marches and assemblies, the turnout figure is a matter of controversy, since it is difficult to accurately estimate. With different methods of estimation, the organisers estimated there were at least 250,000 participants, and the police projected 63,000. A study team from the University of Hong Kong estimated 80,000 to 100,000 people. A University of Hong Kong actuary lecturer and his team estimated 60,000 to 80,000. The different methods used by the organisers and the study teams contributed to discrepancies. The police declined to disclose the method they had adopted, saying that their figure is for internal reference and arrangement.

== Aftermath ==
=== Rumour of Beijing offer for suffrage in 2017 ===
Pro-democracy lawmaker Ronny Tong said he was contacted by a middleman and that he would not agree to the 2017 date, because too many leaders will have changed in Hong Kong and Beijing before then. Democratic Party chairman Lee Wing Tat responded to the rumours by saying that 2017 was too late, and 2012 was the latest date he would accept. James To, also of the Democratic Party, said he was contacted by someone in the PRC government asking for his reaction if Beijing proposed "letting Hong Kong have democracy as early as 2012 if conditions are mature, and not later than 2017." It is unknown what To's response was.

However, according to Xinhua News Agency, the Liaison Office of the Central People's Government in Hong Kong responded by saying these reports "are groundless".

=== The vote ===
The 2005 Hong Kong electoral reform was voted on by the LegCo on 21 December. This legislation needed 40 votes in the 60 seat LegCo to pass. The 25 pro-democracy legislators were expected to vote against it, although there were continuing rumours that some might switch their position and supported it. The report needed 6 pro-democracy legislators supporting it to pass. The radio program The Tipping Point ran a survey on which legislators are most likely to vote for it.

Eventually, with the opposition of 24 pro-democracy legislators (except for Lau Chin Shek who abstained), both the election reform proposals for Chief Executive and LegCo were turned down.

== See also ==
- 2005 Hong Kong electoral reform
- Tell me (advertisement)
- Chris Patten
- Hong Kong Front
- Elections in Hong Kong
- Pro-democracy camp
- 2010 Hong Kong Democracy Protests
- 2012 Dual Universal Suffrage (Hong Kong)
