= Wang Chau housing controversy =

The Wang Chau housing controversy (Chinese: 橫洲公屋爭議) comprises a series of events related to a housing project in Wang Chau, Yuen Long District, Hong Kong. Initiated in 2012, the housing project aims to develop 17,000 public housing units in three phases. Phase 1 refers to ongoing development of 4,000 units in a "green-belt" site; while phases 2 and 3 refer to the deferred plan to build the rest of the targeted units in the "brownfield" site. The case came under media scrutiny after activist Eddie Chu Hoi-dick raised concerns about potential collusion between the Hong Kong government, businesses and rural landlords in his election campaign.

== Planning and engineering study ==
In July 2012, Hong Kong Housing Authority commissioned Ove Arup & Partners Hong Kong Limited (Arup) to conduct a study on the feasibility of the Wang Chau Public Housing Development. The Study covered planning, engineering and environmental issues. Results indicated that it was technically feasible to develop 17 000 public housing flats in Wang Chau.

== Task force and consultation ==
=== Task force chaired by chief executive ===
The Chief Executive of Hong Kong, Leung Chun-ying set up a task force to discuss issues relating to public housing development at Queen's Hill and Wang Chau. The task force met once on 27 June 2013 to discuss about statutory procedure, consultation, brownfield and environmental protection. The Financial Secretary John Tsang was absent from the meeting.

=== Two rounds of informal consultation before downsizing the plan ===
On 16 July 2013 and 5 September 2013, representatives of the Housing Department and Home Affairs Department carried out two informal consultations with the following rural leaders:

- Chairman of Ping Shan Rural Committee: Tsang Shu-wo
- First Vice-chairman of Ping Shan Rural Committee: Tang Tat-sin
- Chairman of Yuen Long District Council: Leung Che-cheung
- District Council Member of the concerned constituency: Tang Hing-Ip
- Special Councillor of Heung Yee Kuk representing Ping Shan: Tang Chi-Keung

After being briefed on the proposed development plan of building 17, 000 public housing flats at Wang Chau, the local representatives expressed concerns about the need for infrastructural support, impact on environment and brownfield issues.

In early January 2014, the Housing Department proposed to the Secretary for Transport and Housing that the Wang Chau Housing Development be carried out in phases, firstly with Phase 1 (development in green-belt site) and leaving Phases 2 and 3 (development in brown-belt site) to later periods. This proposal was approved by the Secretary, who then reported to the senior levels of the Government.

== Meeting between three secretaries ==
The Chief Executive chaired a meeting attended by the top government officials - Financial Secretary, Chief Secretary and Secretary for Justice on 27 January 2014. Leung decided to take the Housing Department's recommendation to defer the second and third phases.

== Consultation after downsizing the plan ==
=== Two rounds of informal consultation ===
Officials from the Housing Department held two rounds of informal consultations on 12 March 2014 and 17 March 2014 with Yuen Long rural leaders to explain the adjusted target.

Secretary for Transport and Housing, Anthony Cheung said "no minutes were taken of the informal consultations and lobbying with local representatives".

=== Formal consultation ===
On 23 May 2014 and 24 June 2014, the Housing Department, in two formal consultations, put forward the Wang Chau public housing development plan to the Ping Shan Rural Committee and the Yuen Long District Council respectively. The proposal included the size of the site for development, number of targeted units, estimated population and other facilities to be constructed.

Participants in the meeting on 24 June 2014 included:

- District Council members and officials from the Yuen Long District Office
- Engineering and Development Department
- Education Bureau
- Police Force
- Planning Department
- Welfare department
- Lands Department
- Transport Department
- Housing Department

However, the proposal only included the plan to build 4,000 public flats on the green belt site, with no reference to any planned development on the brown belt sites. The participants discussed about the infrastructural works required to meet the demands of the development project, as well as technical amendments to the Ping Shan Outline Zoning Plan. Some District Council members expressed concerns regarding:

1. the potential violation of the principle of presumption against development in green-belt zones;
2. the capacity of the West Rail Line in meeting the increased traffic demand;
3. the "fung shui" of the villages in the vicinity; and
4. the residents' living environment as a result of increased population density.

Despite these concerns, some supported the project and opined that it could satisfy the strong housing demand of the public.

=== Support from District Council ===
The Ping Shan Rural Committee members and Yuen Long District Council members agreed with the Wang Chau development plan. Thereafter the District Council passed the development plan on the green belt site, but many councillors criticised the government for not informing them about the plan to develop the brown belt sites.

=== Reluctance towards phases 2 and 3 ===
An internal government document, leaked by Apple Daily, said the Housing Department was "unlikely to proceed" with phases 2 and 3 due to opposition.

== Eviction of non-indigenous villagers ==
=== Notice of eviction ===
In September 2015, Land Department issued eviction letters and resettlement booklets to 200 non-indigenous villagers residing in the three villages, Wing Ning Tsuen, Fung Chi Tsuen, and Yeung Uk Sun Tsuen, requiring them to move out before January 2018. On 11 November 2016, a formal eviction notice was placed at the villages' entrances overnight. Frustrated by the eviction notice, dozens of villagers staged a sit-in protest at the entrances to the villages in an attempt to block officials' access into the villages.

=== District Council proceeded to the details of the Housing Department ===
On 21 May 2015, the Yuen Long District Council in a meeting discussed on the proposed infrastructural works from the Civil Engineering and Development Department on public access road for the Wang Chau project. The Discussion Paper only referred to downsized target, the 4000 public housing units.

== Alleged collusion ==
=== Plan submitted to the Legislative Council ===
In March 2016, the Development Bureau and the Transport and Housing Bureau submitted the Latest Plan for Public Housing Development at Wang Chau to the LegCo Panel on Development. According to the Plan, the P&E Study estimated that the development at Wang Chau "could produce a total of 17,000 public housing units", and stated that the Housing Authority planned to "first develop the southern portion of the site for about 4,000 public housing units" after considering "the overall development priority and the time required for the clearance of the existing squatters, temporary structures, brownfield operations, etc.".

=== Alleged collusion ===
In July and August 2016, Eddie Chu brought up the Wang Chau issue during his campaign for the LegCo Election 2016. Chu doubted if there was collusion between the Government, landlords, businesses, and triads in the downsizing of the Wang Chau project. Besides, Chu criticized the Government for carrying out informal discussions with rural leaders instead of conducting formal public consultation.

== Meeting with secretaries and press ==
=== Meeting between Chu and government officials ===
On 10 September 2016, Leung Chun-ying and Eddie Chu had a phone conversation. According to Chu, he asked Leung to explain why the Government abandoned the public housing project at the brownfield site. Leung replied that he would instruct Secretary for Development Paul Chan Mo-po to look into the case.

On 15 September 2016, Paul Chan and Authority Cheung met with Eddie Chu and Edward Yiu Chung-yim, architectural sector lawmaker-elect to exchange views on the Wang Chau development project.

=== Press conference ===
Chief Executive (Leung Chun-ying), Financial Secretary (John Tsang), Secretary for Transport and Housing Bureau (Anthony Cheung), Acting Secretary for Development, Permanent Secretary for Transport and Housing and Deputy Secretary for Development spoke on the Wang Chau housing project after leaked documents revealed the task force chaired by CE had engaged in informal consultations with rural leaders.

==== Informal consultations with rural leader ====
Leung denied any trade-off with rural forces at all, citing parts of the internal document that the 4000 units have always been referred to as "phase one" of the Wang Chau project, out of the targeted 17,000 flats. He made clear that the government sought to tackle the "Easy first and then hard", given that the P&E Study showed phases 2 and 3 required the government to deal with more complicated issues such as the (1) contamination and (2) the handling of brownfield operations.

==== Task force and the "Three Secretaries Meeting" ====
In defence of the task force and "Three Secretaries Meeting", Leung described the Wang Chau housing project as a "very rare opportunity for the government to be able to build large numbers of public housing units", which justified him taking charge of the task force. He added that it was appropriate for him to assist in coordinating work since Financial Secretary was the head of the Steering Committee of Land Supply and oversaw the Development Bureau; while Chief Secretary oversaw the Transport and Housing Bureau.

==== Tsang's involvement in the Wang Chau project ====
Tsang accepted that the Steering Committee had been told to carry out detailed discussions on Queen's Hill and Wang Chau, but denied responsibility for the decision to develop Wang Chau in phases.

=== LegCo's special powers under the Power and Privileges Ordinance (Cap 382) ===
On 18 September 2016, 28 pan-democrats and localists lawmakers-elect signed an open letter addressed to Leung and the development and housing ministers. The letter demanded explanations from the officials and urged them to carry out a public consultation on the Wang Chau project.

On 22 September 2016, Eddie Chu suggested that the pan-democrats and localists should seek to invoke the LegCo's special powers under the Powers and Privileges Ordinance (Cap 382) to investigate the Government's decision-making process behind the Wang Chau housing plan. Starry Lee Wai-king, said that she did not find it necessary to invoke the Ordinance, and she would liaise with the Secretary for Transport and Housing to release relevant documents.

=== Government explaining Wang Chau Plan to LegCo ===
On 18 October 2016, the Government submitted a paper to the LegCo Panel on Housing to "provide information on the background and the latest development of the Wang Chau Development, including the considerations and justifications for the Government's decision to take forward the Development in phases." The Government also made public the 2012 Planning and Engineering Study Report.

== Recent developments ==
=== LegCo passed a non-binding motion to suspend funding for the Wang Chau project ===
On 22 November 2016, The Legislative Council Development Panel passed a non-binding motion (22-20) to separate the funding for the Wang Chau Development Project from that of other capital works in the HK$12.42-billion capital works reserve fund block allocations for fiscal year 2017-18.

== Societal views on government's practices ==
=== Chief executive as the chairman of task force ===
In early September 2016, Leung Chun-ying insisted that he only took a "mediating role" as the chairman of the task force. However, Apple Daily reported that Leung requested the task force to be set up, and the role of the task force would be to "consider" and "iron out" details of the development blueprint, as opposed to Leung's claims that the task force served as a "coordinating body".

Edward Yiu Chung-yim, criticized that the functions of the task force overlapped with those of the steering committee of land supply, which made one doubt Leung's intention in manipulating the Wang Chau development project. On the other hand, former Secretary for Housing, Planning and Lands Michael Suen Ming-yeung commented that it was normal for the Chief Executive to set up an interdepartmental task force if he deemed necessary.

=== "Soft lobbying" ===
According to the Anthony Cheung, contacting local representatives through informal channels was "part of the normal procedures in public housing development projects for which no large-scale consultation exercise are conducted". Executive Council member Cheung Chi-kong agreed that soft lobbying is a necessary part of politics, and said that soft lobbying is "just an informal way to find out what can be negotiated". Besides, Tsang Shu-wo said that he was thankful for the Housing Authority's effort in compromising with different stakeholders and taking into account results of consultations.

Starry Lee Wai-king, member of the LegCo and chairwoman of the Democratic Alliance for the Betterment and Progress of Hong Kong (DAB), said that soft lobbying was necessary but should not replace formal consultations.

On the other hand, former Chief Secretary Anson Chan commented, "it was a bit absurd to convince the public that the government should defer to a rural leader, who is occupying an illegal site where he runs a car park, and instead evict the residents of three villages in the greenbelt area." Similarly, Eddie Chu asserted that soft lobbying meant that villagers affected by the plans were never consulted and that urban planning process needs to be democratised "especially towards the weak and the voiceless".

=== Retaining New World Development's land adjacent to the development area ===
The government was also criticised for colluding with business as Leung did not take back a nearby greenbelt site owned by New World Development (NWD) for the public housing project. In response, Leung denied any transfer of benefits as he did not know NWD owned the adjacent site.
