= 2005 Hong Kong electoral reform =

2005 controversial proposed electoral reform laws in Hong Kong

The 2005 Hong Kong electoral reform was carried out in late 2005 for the selection of the Chief Executive of Hong Kong (CE) in 2007 and Legislative Council of Hong Kong (LegCo) in 2008. The reform proposals were ultimately voted down by the pro-democracy camp.

== Background ==
The Hong Kong Special Administrative Region established in 1997 was governed by the Hong Kong Basic Law, the "mini-constitution" of the region. The Basic Law set out the selecting method of the Chief Executive of Hong Kong (CE) for the first two terms and the Legislative Council of Hong Kong (LegCo) for the first three terms. The selection method of the CE and LegCo was left blank for the 2007 Chief Executive and 2008 Legislative Council elections. Hong Kong Basic Law Article 45 promised that "the ultimate aim is the selection of the Chief Executive by universal suffrage" while Article 68 stipulated that "the ultimate aim is the election of all members of the Legislative Council by universal suffrage".

The politics of the constitutional reforms have dominated Hong Kong agenda since the handover, as the pro-democrats demanded all along an early implementation of universal suffrage for the CE and LegCo elections.

On 26 April 2004, the National People's Congress Standing Committee (NPCSC) reached a verdict stating that the elections of the 2007 CE and 2008 LegCo would not be returned by universal suffrage, thereby defeating the democrats' appeal for 2007/08 universal suffrage.

== 2005 blueprint ==
In March 2005, the unpopular Tung Chee-hwa resigned as Chief Executive, citing health reasons. Chief Secretary for Administration Donald Tsang succeeded in an uncontested election with the controversy over NPCSC's constitutional interpretation.

On 28 October, the Donald Tsang administration announced a blueprint for reforming the 2007/08 methods. The Fifth Report of the Task Force on Constitutional Development proposed limited reforms to the electoral methods for the 2007 and 2008 CE elections as constrained by the April 2004 NPCSC verdict.

=== Chief Executive ===
The report proposed to expand the 800-member Election Committee to 1,600, in the process of which including all 529 District Councillors, including the appointed members by the government, in order to widen the base of the indirect electorate.

Proposed Changes to Composition of the Election Committee
		Existing	Proposed
First Sector	Industrial, commercial and financial sectors	200	300
Second Sector	The Professions	200	300
Third Sector	Labour, social services, religious and other sectors	200	300
Fourth Sector	LegCo and District Councils, Heung Yee Kuk, NPC, and CPPCC	200	700

The minimum nomination count for Chief Executive candidates was correspondingly increased from 100 to 200 members of EC. The Report also recommended that an appropriate mechanism be established to give rise to election proceedings where only one candidate is validly nominated, while the pre-existing election procedures as stipulated in the Chief Executive Election Ordinance (Cap. 569) that candidates would be automatically deemed to be elected in uncontested elections as in the 2002 election.

=== Legislative Council ===
The government also proposed to add 10 seats to the LegCo from 2008 onwards, with five directly elected through geographical constituencies and five functional constituency seats elected by District Councillors. The District Council Functional Constituency would be expanded from 1 seat to 6 seats accordingly. The government claimed that this was the best deal they could muster given the constraints of the NPCSC verdict.

=== District Council ===
On 19 December 2005, Chief Executive Donald Tsang pledged the gradual abolition of appointed seats in District Councils by 2016, with a decrease in the number of nominated seats from 102 to 68 in 2008, then to 0 in 2012 or 2016. Tsang's proposal were to be implemented upon LegCo's approval of the Government's bill on amending Annexes I and II of the Basic Law.

== LegCo voting ==
According to Annex I and II of the Basic Law, an amendment of the electoral methods of CE and LegCo requires the consent of a two-thirds majority of the LegCo, which means the 25 pro-democrats in the LegCo could veto the proposal if they vote en bloc against it.

Initially, the mainstream democrats, represented by the Democratic Party and the Article 45 Concern Group which combined for 12 votes in the legislature indicated their willingness to approve the proposal on the condition that the 159 appointed members of the District Councils would be excluded in the expanded Election Committee. Many in the pro-democracy camp were ready to approve the proposal if the amendment was made, including the Article 45 Concern Group. Although hardliners in the camp refused to make any concessions

In the following weeks, the political winds shifted abruptly to a radical direction. The radical wing stepped up the call for full democracy by launching a signature campaign in newspapers. A dozen political parties and civil groups began another mass rally just before the voting on the proposal. On 4 November, several democratic leaders met with religious leaders Bishop Joseph Zen and Reverend Chu Yiu-ming, who persuaded them to vote en bloc against the government proposal. A week later, a political advertisement appeared on the front pages of several newspapers showing a sandglass in a black background with one written phrase: "Tell me, would I live to see universal suffrage?", addressed by "a 78-year-old man."

As a result, the pro-democrats raised their stakes by demanding a clear road and timetable to full democracy. They claimed to veto the proposal unless the appointment system in the District Councils was abolished and a clear road map and timetable were offered. The representatives from the NPCSC and Hong Kong and Macao Affairs Office (HKMAO) invited social notables and legislators from the Article 45 Concern Group to a meeting, but was turned down by the group. The Chief Executive also repeatedly appealed to the public for support on television and radio programmes.

The democrats launched a rally on 4 December demanding universal suffrage which drew an estimated 100,000 people. The high turnout strengthened the cause of the democrats to veto the proposal. On 21 December 2005, the proposal was turned down with 24 democrats voting en bloc against it, although there were continuing rumours that some might switch their position and support it, except for Lau Chin-shek who abstained.

== Opinion polling ==
A survey in late October 2005 showed that 58.8% of respondents accepted the government proposals while 23.6% disapproved, although 66% of the respondents supported a timetable for full democracy in the reform proposal. After the 3 December rally, a survey showed 49.9% accepted the proposal.

== Timeline ==
The events related to the political reform proposal went on as follows:

=== 2004 ===
- 6 April – the Standing Committee of the National People's Congress (NPCSC) issued its second interpretation on the Hong Kong Basic Law, indicating that electoral reforms are possible in 2007 and stipulating the “five steps” of initiating political reform under Annex I of the Basic Law.
- 15 April – the first step of political reform: Chief Executive Tung Chee-hwa submitted a report to the Chairman of NPCSC on whether there is a need to amend the methods for selecting the Chief Executive in 2007 and for forming LegCo in 2008.
- 26 April – the second step of political reform: the NPCSC passed a decision that negated universal suffrage for Chief Executive elections in 2007 and LegCo elections in 2008, but provided for electoral reform with the Legislative Council withstanding a 50:50 ratio between Geographical Constituencies and Functional Constituencies seats.

=== 2005 ===
- 19 October – The Fifth Report of the Task Force on Constitutional Development was published on package of proposals for the methods for selecting the Chief Executive in 2007 and for forming the Legislative Council in 2008.
- 19 December – Chief Executive Donald Tsang pledged the abolition of appointed seats in District Councils by 2016.
- 21 December – the fourth step of political reform: the Legislative Council vetoed the Motions put by the HKSAR Government to the LegCo concerning the amendment to the methods for selecting the Chief Executive in 2007 and for forming LegCo and its voting procedures.

== See also ==
- 2010 Hong Kong electoral reform
- Article 45 Concern Group
- December 2005 protest for democracy in Hong Kong
- Democratic development in Hong Kong
- 2012 Dual Universal Suffrage (Hong Kong)
