= Tell me (advertisement) =

Tell me was the title of a political advertisement calling for universal suffrage in Hong Kong. It ran as a full-page advert on the front page of most Hong Kong newspapers on 28 October 2005, and inspired many other people and groups in Hong Kong to run advertisements supporting democracy, in response to the government's political reform proposal which ruled out universal suffrage in the 2007 and 2008 elections.

Tell me, will I see the day of universal suffrage? A 78-year-old Hongkonger who waited from 1984 to 2005

(Original:

告訴我，我會看見普選的一天嗎？

一位從1984年等到2005年，現年78歲的香港人)

It was written in white text on a dark background and featured a picture of an hourglass. About HK$200,000 (2005) (US$25,715.76) was spent in placing the ads. In 2007, two more ads were placed, costing about HK$100,000 (US$12,870.01). The old man quoted in the ad worked in the property industry and is now retired. Democratic Party legislator James To assisted him in designing and placing the advertisements.

== See also ==
- 2005 Hong Kong electoral reform
- December 2005 protest for democracy in Hong Kong
