= Fung Chi Tsuen =

Village in Hong Kong

Coordinates: 22.447589°N 114.020314°E

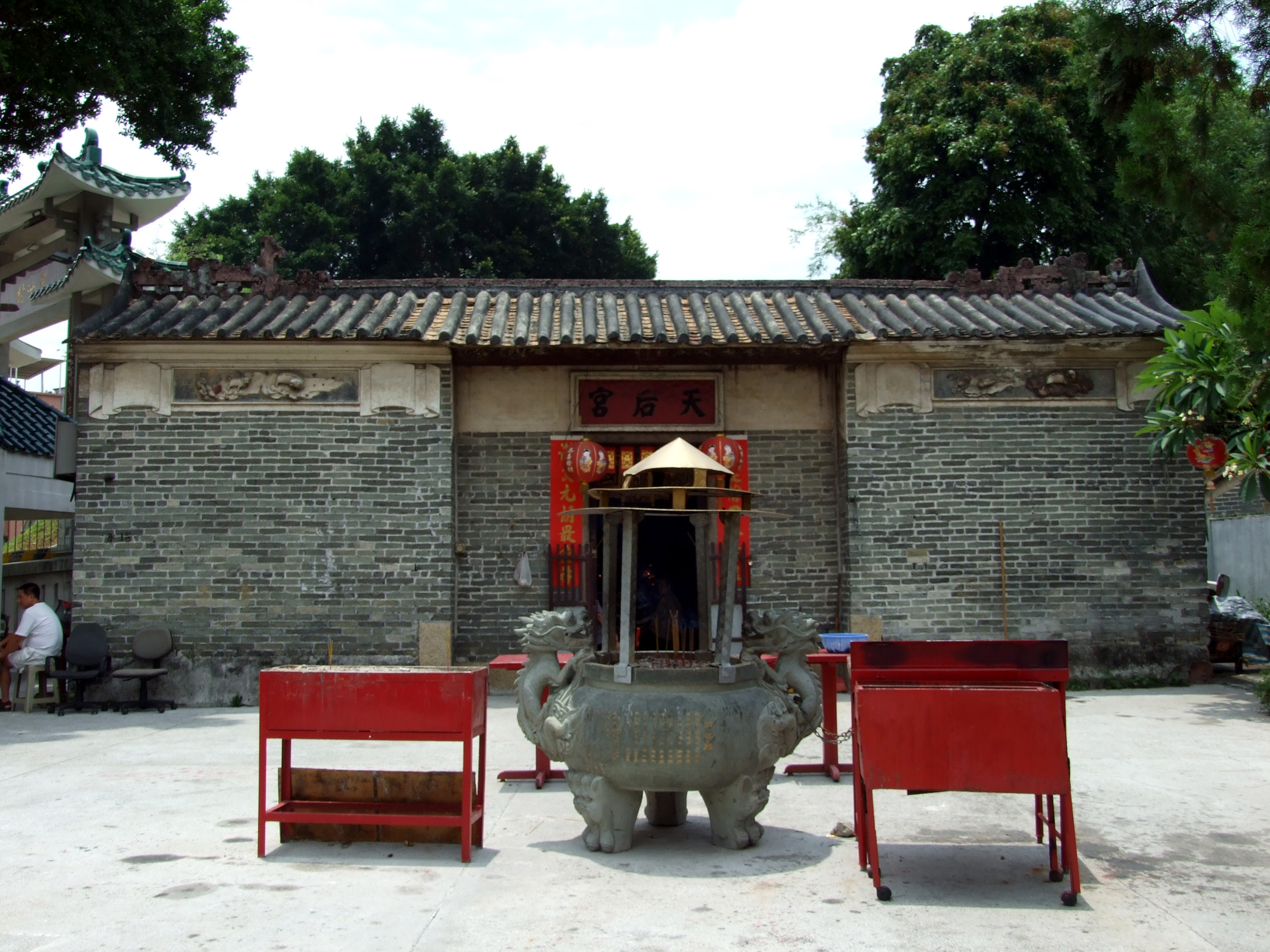
Tin Hau Temple in Fung Chi Tsuen

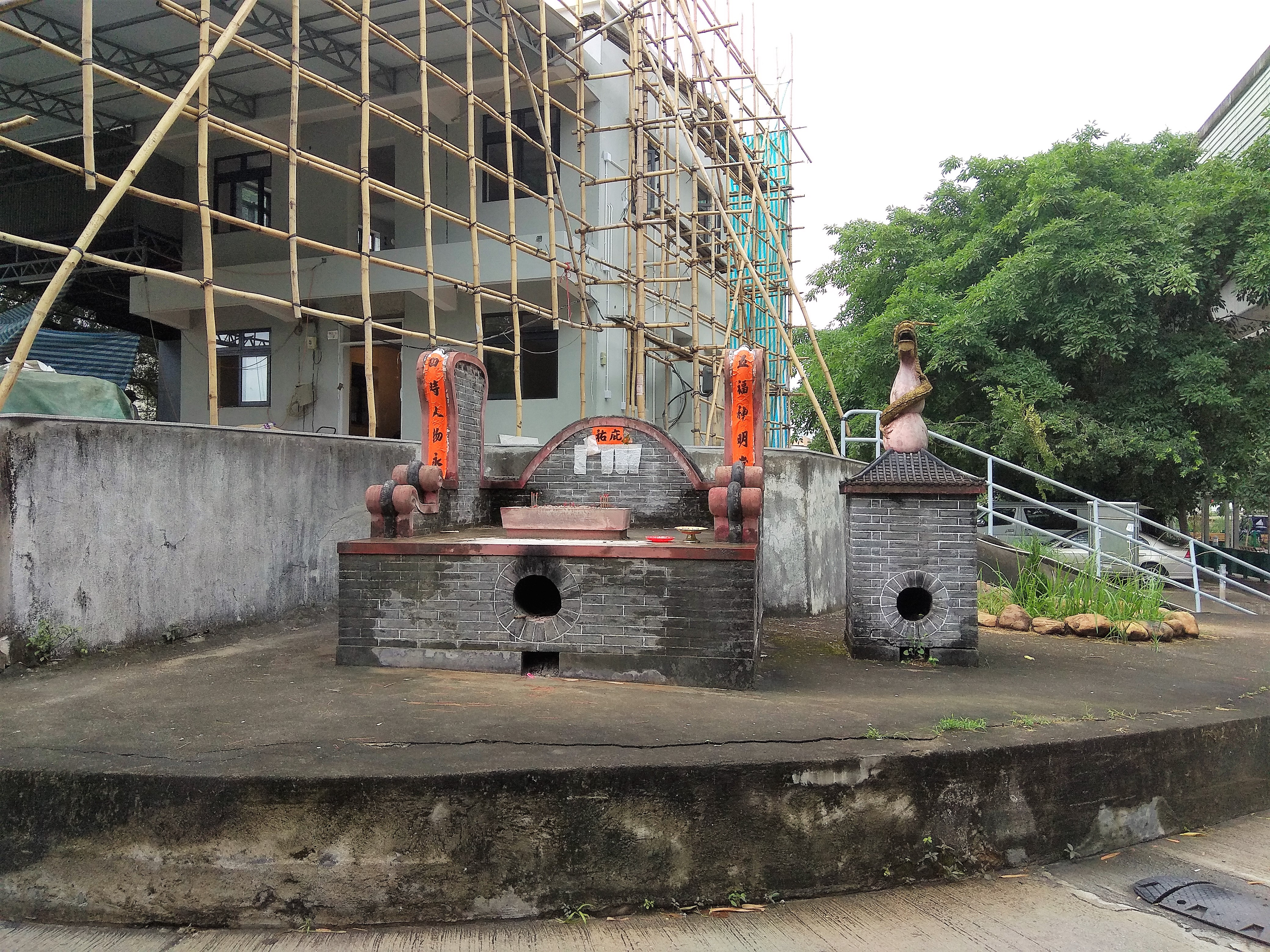
Shrine next to Fung Chi Tsuen Village Office

Fung Chi Tsuen (Chinese: 鳳池村) is a village in Wang Chau, Yuen Long District, Hong Kong.

== Administration ==
Fung Chi Tsuen is a recognized village under the New Territories Small House Policy. Fung Chi Tsuen is one of the 37 villages represented within the Ping Shan Rural Committee. For electoral purposes, Fung Chi Tsuen is part of the Ping Shan Central constituency, which is currently represented by Felix Cheung Chi-yeung.

== See also ==
- Wang Chau housing controversy
