= 2012 Dual Universal Suffrage (Hong Kong) =

Demand for 2012 Hong Kong electoral reform

The 2012 Dual Universal Suffrage was the demand by many Hong Kong residents for the Hong Kong Special Administrative Region (HKSAR) government to implement universal suffrage in the 2012 Chief Executive election and to elect all Legislative Council seats through universal suffrage (genuine universal suffrage). This proposal emerged after the Standing Committee of the National People's Congress (NPCSC) rejected the implementation of dual universal suffrage in 2007 and 2008. It was first proposed by the pro-Beijing political party, the Democratic Alliance for the Betterment and Progress of Hong Kong (DAB), in mid-May 2005. Although the proposal gained majority support from Legislative Council members in 2005, it was ultimately not accepted by Beijing. By 2007, the DAB shifted its support to universal suffrage for the Chief Executive in 2017 and the Legislative Council in 2020.

In the end, the NPCSC decided that neither the Chief Executive nor the Legislative Council elections in 2012 would implement full universal suffrage.

== History ==
=== Background ===
Pro-democracy camp in Hong Kong began advocating for a democratic political system in the 1980s, starting with the call for direct elections in 1988. Regional direct elections were first introduced in the Legislative Council in 1991. In 1995, the United Nations Human Rights Council criticized Hong Kong's functional constituency election system, stating it violated Articles 2(1), 25, and 26 of the International Covenant on Civil and Political Rights. As a result, the pro-democracy camp argued for the immediate abolition of functional constituencies and the full implementation of universal suffrage in the Legislative Council.

During the 1990s, Hong Kong's three major political parties—the Democratic Party, the DAB, and the Liberal Party—were all in favor of dual universal suffrage for 2007 and 2008.

The protest on July 1, 2003 saw over 500,000 citizens marching not only to oppose legislation under Article 23 of the Basic Law but also to demand dual universal suffrage in the 2007 and 2008 Chief Executive and Legislative Council elections.

==== 2004 ====
- January 10: The United Kingdom and the United States reiterated their support for the will of the Hong Kong people, expressing that democracy should be achieved through political reform and universal suffrage. Tens of thousands of Hong Kong citizens participated in a New Year's Day march advocating for universal suffrage.
- March: The Constitutional Development Task Force in Hong Kong released its First Report.
- April 6: The Standing Committee of the National People's Congress (NPCSC) provided interpretations on four issues within Annex I, Article 7, and Annex II, Article 3, of the Basic Law:
1. Whether "after 2007" includes the year 2007.
2. Whether the phrase "if necessary" implies mandatory amendments.
3. Who determines the need for amendments and who proposes amendment bills.
4. Whether the current arrangements remain valid if no amendments are made.
- April 9: The Democratic Alliance for the Betterment and Progress of Hong Kong (DAB) revised its platform from advocating for "universal suffrage in 2007/08" to "universal suffrage in 2012."
- April 15: The Constitutional Development Task Force in Hong Kong released its Second Report, summarizing public opinions gathered over two months on the principles regarding Hong Kong's constitutional development as outlined in the Basic Law.

On the same day, the Chief Executive submitted a Report to the NPCSC, requesting a decision on the possibility of universal suffrage in 2007/08.

- April 26: The 10th NPCSC's 9th meeting passed a decision on the methods for selecting the Chief Executive in 2007 and forming the Legislative Council in 2008. The decision specified that the Chief Executive in 2007 would not be elected through universal suffrage. Furthermore, half of the Legislative Council in 2008 would be elected via universal suffrage, while the other half would remain functional constituencies. This decision delayed Hong Kong's progress toward full universal suffrage.
- May 11: The Constitutional Development Task Force in Hong Kong released its Third Report, detailing the existing methods for electing the Chief Executive and Legislative Council, along with potential areas for amendments under the Basic Law.
- June 23: The Article 45 Concern Group proposed that political reforms should prioritize expanding the electorate base.
- December 15: Chief Executive Donald Tsang expressed hope to prioritize amendments to the election methods for the Chief Executive and Legislative Council. However, he refrained from setting a timetable for universal suffrage. The Fourth Report was also released on the same day. Tsang noted that society was deeply divided on the issue and that the problem was complex. He did not rule out conducting a territory-wide public opinion survey to gather views. Lee Wing-tat, then-chairman of the Democratic Party, criticized the Fourth Report as "caged consultation," while the DAB expressed its support.

=== 2005 ===
- April 13: In response to the U.S.-Hong Kong Policy Act Report, the government stated, "The NPCSC's decision reaffirms that, under the Basic Law and based on Hong Kong's actual circumstances, the progressive development of democracy is a steadfast and consistent position of the central government."
- Donald Tsang, running for Chief Executive, promised to see universal suffrage realized.
- May 13: The consultation period for the Fourth Report by the Constitutional Development Task Force, which gathered public opinions on the methods of selecting the Chief Executive in 2007 and forming the Legislative Council in 2008, officially ended after five and a half months. Over 430 submissions were received.
- October 19: The Constitutional Development Task Force released the Fifth Report, proposing specific reform plans for the selection of the Chief Executive in 2007 and the formation of the Legislative Council in 2008. The government intended to submit these proposals to the Legislative Council (LegCo) in December 2005, seeking approval.
- October 28: After an advertisement advocating for universal suffrage was published by someone signing as "a 78-year-old elder," businessman Koo Ming-kwun published a full-page ad on November 16 in support of the reform proposal and questioned whether the "78-year-old elder" was real. On November 8, the anonymous figure signed as "a 78-year-old elder who believes in tomorrow" and published another full-page ad, stating, "I have done my part; the hope for universal suffrage rests on younger Hong Kongers." Subsequently, pro-democracy groups, civil organizations, and websites (such as A45 News, Radio71, the Hong Kong Federation of Students, Civil Human Rights Front, the Hong Kong Alliance in Support of Patriotic Democratic Movements of China and others) began organizing a major march for universal suffrage on December 4.
- November 4: Donald Tsang, as chair of the Governance and Political Development Subgroup under the Commission on Strategic Development, discussed implementing universal suffrage in accordance with the Basic Law. Chief Secretary Rafael Hui attended a meeting of the Southern District Council to hear opinions on political reform.
- November 13: In a "Letter to Hong Kong" broadcast on RTHK’s Radio 3, legislator Lee Cheuk-yan demanded an immediate timetable for universal suffrage. The Constitutional Affairs Bureau responded, calling it impractical.
- November 22: Gordon Wu, chairman of Hopewell Holdings, stated that pursuing democracy through marches amounted to mob politics and violated the spirit of the rule of law.
- November 29: Martin Lee, Sin Chung-kai, Albert Chan, and Fernando Cheung met with U.S. Secretary of State Condoleezza Rice to discuss Hong Kong's political reform and universal suffrage.
- November 30: Donald Tsang delivered a pre-recorded televised address on three major TV networks at 7:30 p.m., urging LegCo members and the public to support the reform proposals.
- December 2: NPCSC Deputy Secretary-General Qiao Xiaoyang, Deputy Director of the NPC Law Committee Li Fei, and Deputy Director of the Hong Kong and Macau Work Office Zhang Xiaoming held a seminar in Shenzhen. Over 100 LegCo members and representatives from various sectors were invited to share their views on political reform. This included 19 pro-democracy legislators and the chairs and vice-chairs of all LegCo committees, totaling 43 attendees.
- December 4: The pro-democracy camp organized the "2005 March for Universal Suffrage," from Victoria Park to the Government Headquarters. Organizers claimed over 250,000 participants, while police estimated approximately 63,000. Participants included former Chief Secretary Anson Chan.
- December 6: The march organizers reiterated the figure of 250,000 participants, but independent studies conducted by University of Hong Kong scholars and students estimated between 70,000 and 90,000, showing significant discrepancies.
- December 7: The Chinese University of Hong Kong's Asia-Pacific Institute conducted a survey after the march (December 5–7). Results showed 66% of respondents believed the reform proposal should include a timetable for universal suffrage, while 49.9% expressed general acceptance of the proposal (an 8.9% decrease from before the march), and 28.9% opposed it (a 5.3% increase). Additionally, 56.3% opposed rejecting the proposal, while 35% supported rejection.
- December 19: Anson Chan held a press conference, publicly urging Donald Tsang to propose to the central government that universal suffrage be implemented no later than 2012. That afternoon, Tsang announced a phased reduction in appointed District Council seats: a one-third reduction in 2008, further reductions in 2012, and full abolition by 2016.
- December 21: LegCo resumed discussions on the reform proposal. At 5:30 p.m., the amendment regarding the Chief Executive election method was voted on, with 34 in favor, 24 against, and 1 abstention. The motion failed to secure the two-thirds majority needed and was rejected. The approval rate for both proposals was 57.6% (34 out of 59), which is roughly the same as the 56.3% disapproval rate recorded in the public opinion poll on December 7. This accurately reflects public sentiment in Hong Kong, indicating that the No. 5 political reform proposal indeed failed to secure a two-thirds majority of public support.
- December 22: Chief Secretary Henry Tang held a midnight press conference, stating that rejecting the proposal defied public opinion and blaming Cardinal Joseph Zen and legislator Martin Lee for the consequences, which drew strong reactions from Catholic communities.
- December 22: Donald Tsang expressed disappointment, stating that Hong Kong had missed an opportunity to take a major step toward democracy and that the LegCo vote dashed hopes for earlier implementation of more democratic elections.
- December 22: A spokesperson for the Hong Kong and Macau Work Office announced that, per the Basic Law and the NPCSC's interpretation, the 2007 Chief Executive and 2008 Legislative Council election methods would remain unchanged.
- December 28: Premier Wen Jiabao, meeting with Donald Tsang, remarked that deep-seated contradictions and problems in Hong Kong remained unresolved.

In 2005, the Hong Kong government, following the NPCSC's decisions, issued the Fifth Report of the Constitutional Development Task Force, outlining methods for the 2007 Chief Executive election and the 2008 Legislative Council election. The pro-democracy camp opposed the plan, criticizing the lack of universal suffrage, a timetable, and a roadmap. Their rejection prevented the proposals from obtaining the required two-thirds majority in LegCo, leading to their ultimate failure.

=== 2006 ===
- January 12: Donald Tsang stated during a Legislative Council session that no new political reform proposals would be introduced during the remainder of his term.
- November 6: The Chief Executive Election Democratic Task Force announced its joint recommendation of Alan Leong to run for Chief Executive, advocating for dual universal suffrage in 2012.
- December 10: On the election day for the Election Committee, the Civic Party, Democratic Party, and ADPL jointly endorsed 137 candidates, with 114 being elected—a significant victory for the pro-democracy camp.

=== 2007 ===
- January 31: Alan Leong officially declared his candidacy for Chief Executive, promoting dual universal suffrage in 2012.
- February 1: The Democratic Alliance for the Betterment and Progress of Hong Kong (DAB) removed the phrase "pursuing dual universal suffrage in 2012" from its political platform.
- February 11: Alan Leong released his "Manifesto for the Democratic Government We Want," emphasizing his commitment to universal suffrage by 2012.
- March 1: Hong Kong's first-ever Chief Executive candidate debate was held, marking a historic moment. During the debate, Donald Tsang expressed confidence in resolving the issue of universal suffrage during his term.
- March 25: The first Chief Executive election in Hong Kong involving a pro-democracy candidate took place. Alan Leong, with 123 votes, was decisively defeated by Donald Tsang, who secured 649 votes. Leong vowed to continue advocating for dual universal suffrage in 2012.
- April: Although the methods for electing the Chief Executive in 2007 and the Legislative Council in 2008 were already determined, the pro-democracy camp persisted in pushing for dual universal suffrage in 2012 and proposed constitutional reform plans.
- July 11: The Hong Kong government published its first post-handover Green Paper on Constitutional Development. The paper primarily explored universal suffrage methods for the Chief Executive and the Legislative Council, serving as an important public consultation on political reform.
- October 7: The pro-democracy camp organized the 2007 Umbrella for Dual Universal Suffrage Rally, featuring a 5-minute umbrella-holding demonstration and a march to express their determination to secure universal suffrage in 2012. The event set a Guinness World Record.
- October 10: The Legislative Council resumed its sessions on the same day the consultation period for the Green Paper ended.
- December 12: The Chief Executive submitted a report to the Standing Committee of the National People's Congress (NPCSC) regarding the consultation on constitutional development and the potential amendment of the electoral methods for the Chief Executive and Legislative Council in 2012. The report requested clarification on whether universal suffrage would be allowed.
- December 23–29: The NPCSC convened a meeting and invited Hong Kong deputies to participate. The committee reviewed Hong Kong's report on constitutional development and prepared a draft decision.
- December 29: The NPCSC unanimously approved a draft decision stating:
  1. Universal suffrage would not be implemented for the Chief Executive election in 2012.
  2. Universal suffrage would not be implemented for the Legislative Council election in 2012.
  3. The electoral methods for 2012 could be amended in accordance with the Basic Law.
  4. The Legislative Council would continue to be composed equally of geographical constituencies and functional constituencies.
  5. Universal suffrage for the Chief Executive election could be implemented in 2017.
  6. Once the Chief Executive is elected by universal suffrage, all Legislative Council seats would also be elected through universal suffrage.

On the same day, the pro-democracy camp held the 2007 Anti-NPC Rejection of Universal Suffrage Rally, starting at the Legislative Council and ending at Government House. Nearly 7,000 people participated.

=== 2008 ===
- January 13: The Civil Human Rights Front, the pro-democracy camp, and six Christian groups organized a march advocating for dual universal suffrage in 2012 under the theme "No Fake Democracy in 2017." During the march, an adapted version of the 2008 Beijing Olympics countdown anthem We Are Ready was played to underscore their demands. The organizers estimated 22,000 participants, surpassing their expectation of 20,000, while the police estimated 6,800 attendees.

== Documents ==
=== Relevant consultation documents ===
- Green Paper on Constitutional Development.
- Public Consultation Report on the Green Paper on Constitutional Development.
- Report Submitted by the Hong Kong Special Administrative Region to the Standing Committee of the National People's Congress on the Consultation on Constitutional Development in Hong Kong and Whether Amendments Are Needed for the 2012 Chief Executive and Legislative Council Election Methods.

=== Relevant provisions and legal clauses ===
Basic Law of the Hong Kong Special Administrative Region of the People's Republic of China (referred to as the Basic Law) Provisions on Universal Suffrage:

- Article 45: The Chief Executive of the HKSAR shall be selected by election or through consultations held locally and shall be appointed by the Central People's Government. The method for selecting the Chief Executive shall be specified in light of the actual situation in the HKSAR and in accordance with the principle of gradual and orderly progress, with the ultimate aim of selection by universal suffrage upon the Nominating Committee (Hong Kong) by a broadly representative nominating committee in accordance with democratic procedures.
- Article 68: The Legislative Council of the HKSAR shall be constituted by elections. The method for forming the Legislative Council shall be determined in light of the actual situation in the HKSAR and in accordance with the principle of gradual and orderly progress, with the ultimate aim of having all members of the Legislative Council elected by universal suffrage.
- Annex I, Article 7: After 2007, any amendments to the method for selecting the Chief Executive shall require a two-thirds majority in the Legislative Council, the consent of the Chief Executive, and approval by the Standing Committee of the National People's Congress.
- Annex II, Article 3: Amendments to the method for forming the Legislative Council and its voting procedures after 2007 shall also require the same process of approval.
- Standing Committee of the National People's Congress Interpretation of Annex I and Annex II: Whether amendments to the methods for selecting the Chief Executive or forming the Legislative Council are necessary shall be determined by the Chief Executive submitting a report to the Standing Committee of the NPC, based on the actual situation in Hong Kong and the principle of gradual and orderly progress.

The Sino-British Joint Declaration on the Question of Hong Kong (referred to as the Joint Declaration):

- Article 4 (excerpt): The government of the HKSAR shall be composed of local inhabitants. The Chief Executive shall be selected through election or consultation held locally and shall be appointed by the Central People's Government.

Explanatory Note on the Basic Policies of the PRC Regarding Hong Kong:

- Chapter 1 (excerpt): The HKSAR government and legislature shall be composed of local inhabitants, with the Chief Executive selected locally and appointed by the Central Government.

== Music ==
- 2012 We Are Ready.
- "Together We Stand with Hong Kong": A song adapted from the 10th Anniversary of the Hong Kong Special Administrative Region, featuring lyrics advocating universal suffrage.

== Major events ==
- December 2005 protest for democracy in Hong Kong
- 2006 and 2007 July 1 protests
- 2007 march for universal suffrage
- 2007 protest against NPC's rejection of universal suffrage
- 2008 march for dual universal suffrage in 2012

== Public opinions ==
=== Submissions and proposals ===
==== 2012 proposals ====
- Pan-democrats:
  - Nominating Committee: 800 existing members plus 400 directly elected district councilors.
  - Number of nominations: 50 individuals.
  - Functional constituencies: Transform into a proportional representation system for the entire region.
- Regina Ip's proposal:
  - Nominating Committee: Expand from 800 to 1,600 members.
  - Number of nominations: 100 per sector.
  - Functional constituencies: Transition to a proportional representation system.

== See also ==
- 2005 Hong Kong electoral reform
- 2010 Hong Kong electoral reform
- 2014 Hong Kong protests
- 2014–2015 Hong Kong electoral reform
