= Wing Ning Tsuen, Yuen Long District =

Village in Hong Kong

Coordinates: 22.450219°N 114.017043°E

Wing Ning Tsuen (Chinese: 永寧村) is a village in Wang Chau, Yuen Long District, Hong Kong.

== Administration ==
Wing Ning Tsuen is a recognized village under the New Territories Small House Policy. Wing Ning Tsuen is one of the 37 villages represented within the Ping Shan Rural Committee. For electoral purposes, Wing Ning Tsuen is part of the Ping Shan Central constituency.

== See also ==
- Wang Chau housing controversy
