= Land Justice League =

Land Justice League 土地正義聯盟
- Founded: July 2011
- Split from: League of Social Democrats
- Membership: ~700
- Ideology: Communalism; Direct democracy Environmentalism; Left-wing localism
- Political position: Left-wing
- Regional affiliation: Pro-democracy camp
- Legislative Council: 0 / 90
- District Councils: 0 / 470

Website
- landjusticehk.org

Land Justice League
- Traditional Chinese: 土地正義聯盟
Transcriptions
Yue: Cantonese
- Yale Romanization: Tóu deih jing yih lyùhn màhng
- Jyutping: Tou2 dei6 zing3 ji6 lyun4 mang4

The Land Justice League is a Hong Kong activist group that co-opts other social groups who are interested in a common cause known as “land justice”.

The membership is roughly divided into two groups—one rooted in activist movements dating to the protection of the Star Ferry Pier in 2006, which extended to the Choi Yuen Chuen rally in 2009; the other group consists of followers of the political party League of Social Democrats, run by longtime social activists. The former group of activists generally base their action on what is called a "localist movement" and they are a group of well educated youngsters with theory-based ideals. They also tend to plan their actions strategically. Their only shortcoming is that they are thin on resources. They are also fastidious about not being associated with any political party.

The group filled in candidates in the 2011 District Council election and 2015 District Council election but did not gain any seats. In the 2016 Legislative Council election, its core member veteran activist Eddie Chu ran as an independent and was elected by more than 80,000 votes, the highest number received by a candidate in the legislature's geographical constituencies.

== Objectives ==
The objectives of the Land Justice League are:

1. To let city and village life run in parallel with each other – We are opposed to all kinds of gentrification of old urban neighborhoods which breaks up community ties, and unsustainable development of village and country land, which should be returned to farming mode.
2. To preserve the natural environment – Profiteering must not be the excuse to destroy ecological life.
3. To claim the right of a decent shelter for everyone – The right of accommodation is a basic human right.
4. To eradicate real estate tyranny – We must no longer allow the few developer conglomerates exert control over our basic needs. Government must stop the commoditization of and speculation in land.
5. To put an end to collusion between government, indigenous villagers and developers – A fair and open procedure and system must replace the present venal relationship between those parties in relation to the small house policy and land resumption for development.
6. To institute a democratic land planning system – This applies to urban redevelopment as well as development of the countryside.

== Electoral performance ==
=== District Council elections ===
Election	Number of popular votes	% of popular votes	Total elected seats	+/−
2011	3,025	0.26	0 / 412	0
2015	1,482 ▼	0.10 ▼	0 / 431	0

== See also ==
- Socialism in Hong Kong
