= Hong Kong 1 July marches =

1997–2020 annual protest rallies

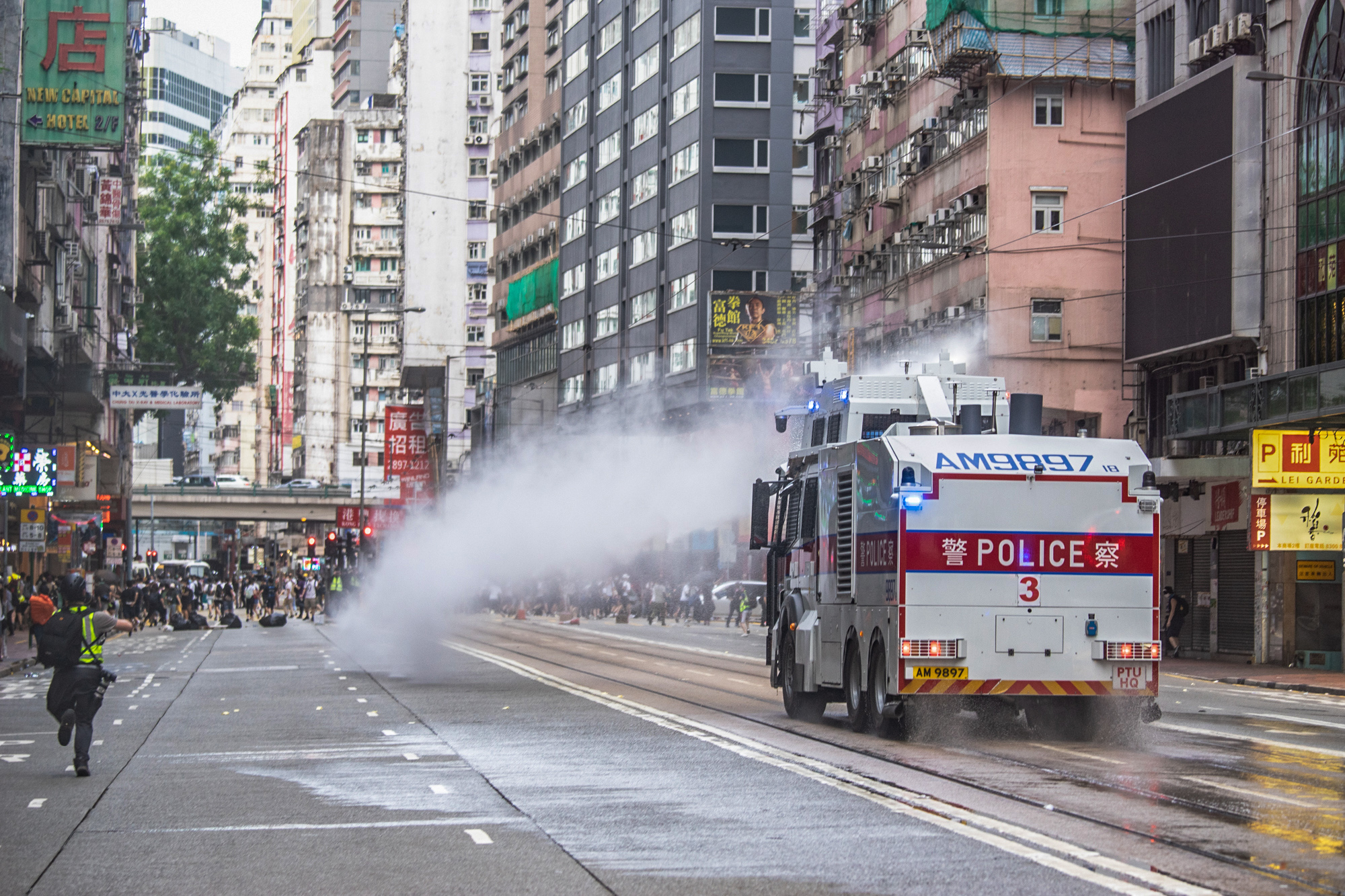
- Water cannons deployed during the Hong Kong 1 July march in 2020, which is viewed as the last marches seen on that day after all those years
- Traditional Chinese: 七一大遊行
- Simplified Chinese: 七一大游行
Transcriptions
Standard Mandarin
- Hanyu Pinyin: Qī Yī Dà Yóuxíng
Yue: Cantonese
- Yale Romanization: Chāt yāt daaih yàuh hahng
- Jyutping: Cat1 jat1 daai6 jau4 hang6

The Hong Kong 1 July protests were annual protest rallies originally held by the Civil Human Rights Front from the day of handover in 1997 on the HKSAR establishment day. However, it was not until 2003 that the march drew large public attention by opposing the legislation of Basic Law Article 23. The 2003 protest, with 500,000 marchers, was the second-largest protest seen in Hong Kong since the 1997 handover.

Prior to this, only the pro-democracy protest on 21 May 1989 drew more people with 1.5 million marchers in Hong Kong sympathising with the participants of the Tiananmen Square protests of 1989. The introduction of Article 23 legislation was left aside due to the protest. Since then, 1 July marches have been organised every year to demand for democracy, universal suffrage, rights of minorities, protection of freedom of speech, and a variety of other political concerns.

In 2019, the anti-extradition bill protest on 16 June broke the record of largest protest in Hong Kong with nearly 2 million marchers. The 1 July march in the same year with 550,000 marchers, was the largest 1 July march. However, both these widely reported figures are now in doubt with research published by the Public Opinion Programme at The University of Hong Kong (HKUPOP) estimating that the attendance figures were 500,000-800,000 for the 16 June march and 260,000 for 1 July.

In 2020, despite a police ban citing gathering limits during the COVID-19 pandemic, and a dramatically altered legal situation due to the national security law that had come into force only the previous evening, marches with a total of tens of thousands of participants took place in several parts of the city. Police made more than 370 arrests, among which at least ten were on alleged violations of the new law.

== 1997–2002 ==
After the 1997 handover to 2002, marches were organised annually by the Hong Kong Alliance in Support of Patriotic Democratic Movements of China. By the end of 2002, the proposed anti-subversion legislation, as required by the Article 23 of the Basic Law, the constitutional document of the territory, sparked off heated debate and opposition. The public was worried civil rights and liberties would be adversely affected. The Civil Human Rights Front was formed by grassroots civil organisations and pro-democracy politicians. A march was held on 15 December 2002 from Victoria Park to the Central Government Offices, with a turnout of 65,000.

The government attempted to pass Article 23 in Legislative Council, tabling the vote for 9 July 2003. The debate continued for months, with the Hong Kong Government refusing to any concessions. The bill eventually led to a series of 1 July marches.

== 2003 ==
=== Motivation ===
The headline theme for the 2003 march was to oppose the anti-subversion Hong Kong Basic Law Article 23. Fear of the loss of freedom of speech along with other freedoms, as well as a general dissatisfaction against the Hong Kong Government prompted a mass protest of hundreds of thousands of people on 1 July 2003. The government attempted to pass Article 23 in Legislative Council, tabling the vote for 9 July 2003. The debate continued for months, with the Government refusing to make any concessions. Other issues include a number of blunders by the Tung Chee Hwa administration adding to people's frustrations, including the "Lexusgate" scandal involving the Financial Secretary Antony Leung and the government's incompetent handling of the SARS health crisis, all against the backdrop of the state of the economy.

=== Formation ===
The planners originally wanted all four football courts in Victoria Park, but all courts were booked for a pro-Beijing festival and fair. The organisers originally predicted only 20,000 demonstrators would participate. The actual number ranged from 350,000 (as quoted by the police) to 700,000 (as quoted by protesters) and even 1,000,000 (quoted from a pro-Falun Gong agency). The generally accepted figure is 500,000, a little less than one tenth the population at the time. Some Christian churches led by Rev. Chu Yiu Ming (朱耀明) of the Baptist Church and Roman Catholics led by Bishop Joseph Zen organised a prayer gathering in Victoria Park before the march which was attended by some 40,000 people. The Civil Human Rights Front was also organised. Members of Falun Gong also took part in the protest, but have been asked by the organisers to march at the end of the rally. The march was originally scheduled to start at 2:30 pm at the football pitch in Victoria Park, arriving at the government headquarter building. Their route stretched from Victoria Park football field through Causeway Bay and Central to the Government's Central offices. Nonetheless, the large numbers meant that people were still starting the march as late as 10 pm.

=== Aftermath ===
After half-million people protested against the law, James Tien resigned from the Executive Council to vote against proposals for legislation as required under Article 23 of the Hong Kong Basic Law. The Government then backed down on the proposal because it lacked the necessary votes to pass the legislation after losing the support of Tien's Liberal Party. Afterwards, Regina Ip and Antony Leung resigned, stating "personal reasons".

== 2004 ==
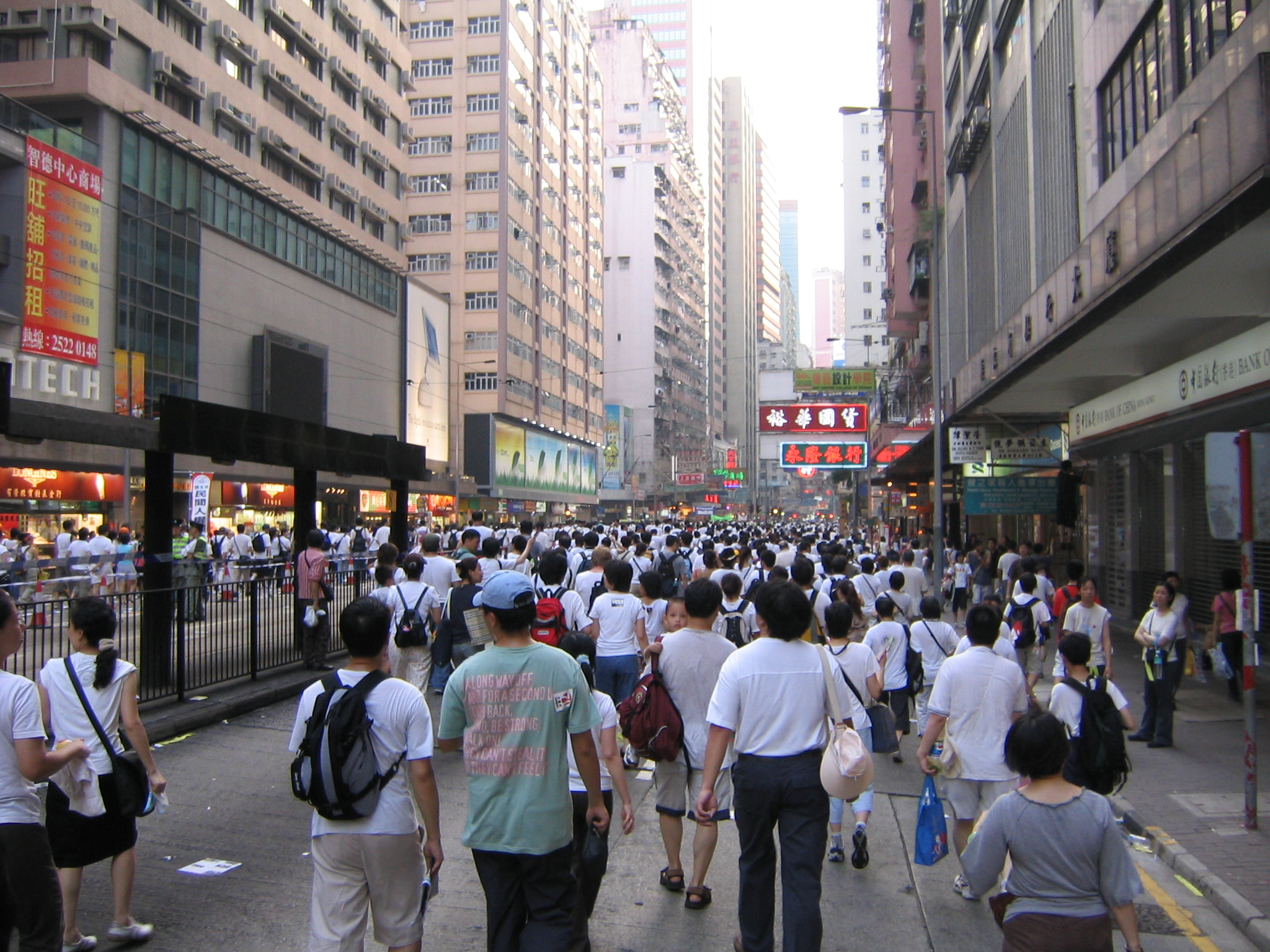
Hong Kongers dressed in white and walked out along Paterson Street.

The headline theme for 1 July 2004 march was "Striving For Universal Suffrage in '07 & '08 for the chief executive and Legislature respectively (爭取07, 08普選)." As the National People's Congress Standing Committee attempted to modify the Basic Law on 6 April 2004 to deny direct elections for the chief executive in 2007 and the Legislative Council in 2008. There was much criticism as to the slogan for the 2004 protest by some Beijing bureaucrats and pro-Beijing political parties. The phrase "Return power to the people" was particularly inflammatory, because it implied that power was taken away from the people, according to pro-Beijing parties. Some pro-democracy political leaders such as Lau Chin-shek had considered changing the phrase, but many criticised this move as it was seen to be satisfying Beijing. The organisers kept the phrase.

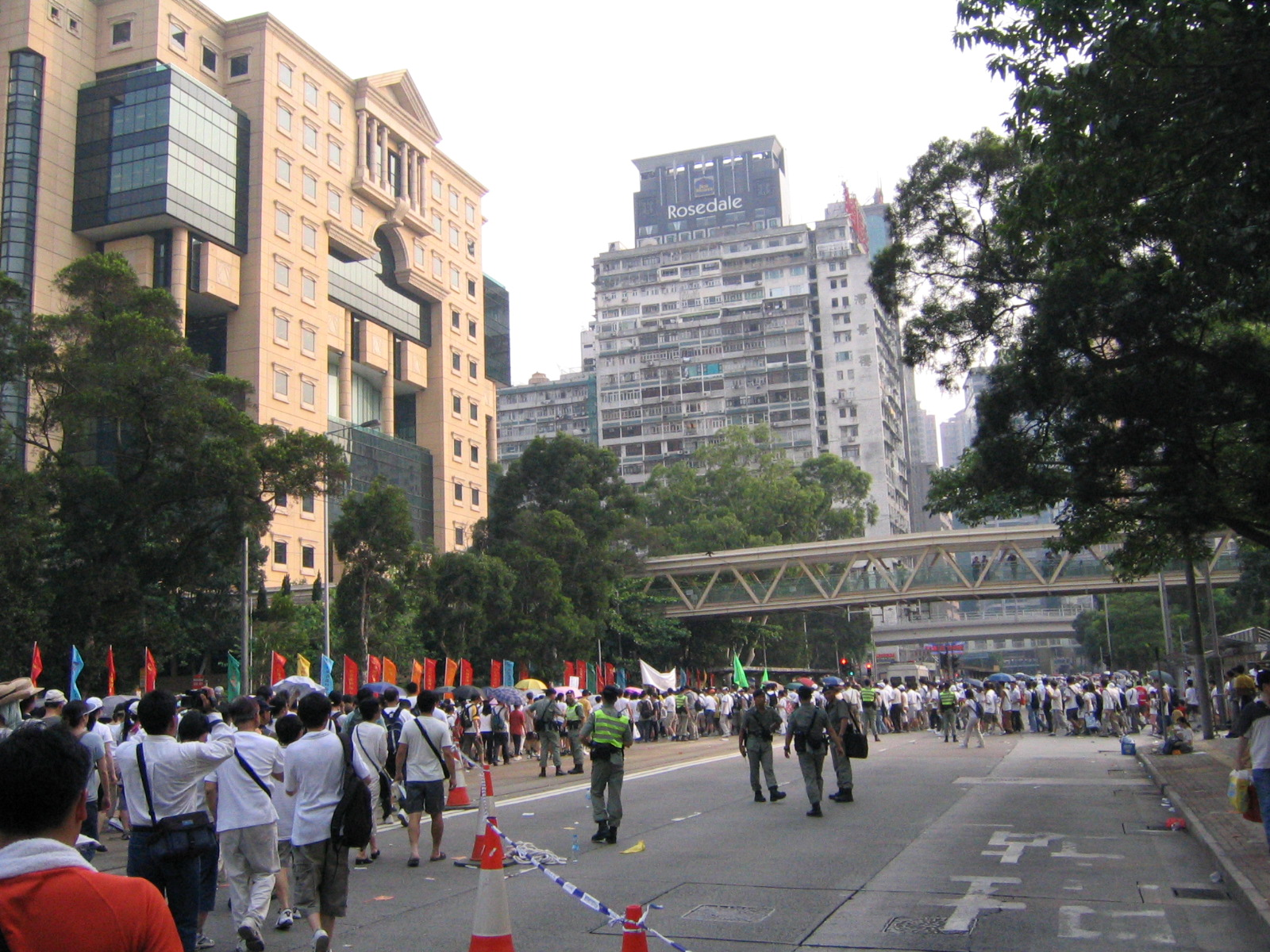
Hong Kongers walked out of their holiday (photo taken outside Hong Kong Central Library).

White was the dress code for the day representing the desire for universal suffrage. On the other hand, pro-government groups lobbied the public to wear red (the colour traditionally worn for celebratory occasion in Chinese culture) to take part in a counter-protest they were holding. Despite the dazzling heat, the number of turn out was still very high. Numerous sources debated on the size of the actual turnouts. The organisers, Civil Human Rights Front, estimated that 530,000 took part in the demonstration, surpassing the number from the previous year, while the police set the figure at 200,000. The figures were disputed by many, saying that the number could not have been over 200,000. Dr. P.S. Yip Senior Lecturer of the Department of Statistics & Actuarial Science of the University of Hong Kong, suggested that the maximum number of participants could only have been around 192,000. The general acceptance is that the crowd size was smaller than the 2003 crowd.

== 2005 ==
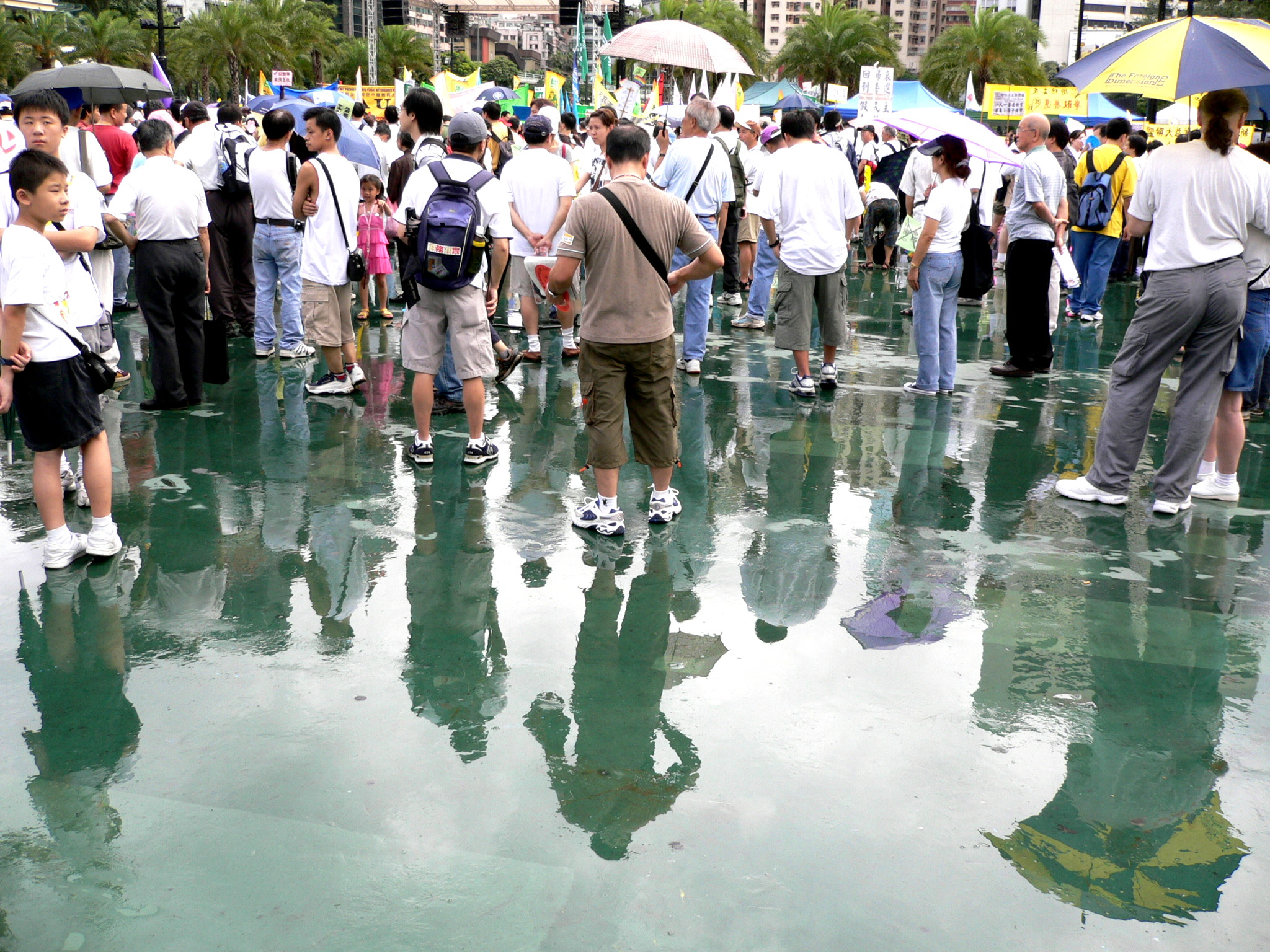
Protesters participated despite the bad weather.

Following the 2004 protest, the next major event was Tung Chee-hwa's resignation in March 2005. Two protests were held in 2005 including the annual 1 July event and a separate December 2005 protest for democracy. The theme for the march was "Oppose government collusion, striving for universal suffrage (反對官商勾結，爭取全面普選)". The July protest mostly build its momentum from the 2004 protest with emphasis that a high degree of autonomy is needed along with more democracy. The protest mostly stood up to the National People's Congress Standing Committee for trying to distort the Basic Law again. Further questions were raised regarding maximum working hours, minimum wage, increase of sexual violence, divide between the rich and poor.

== 2006 ==
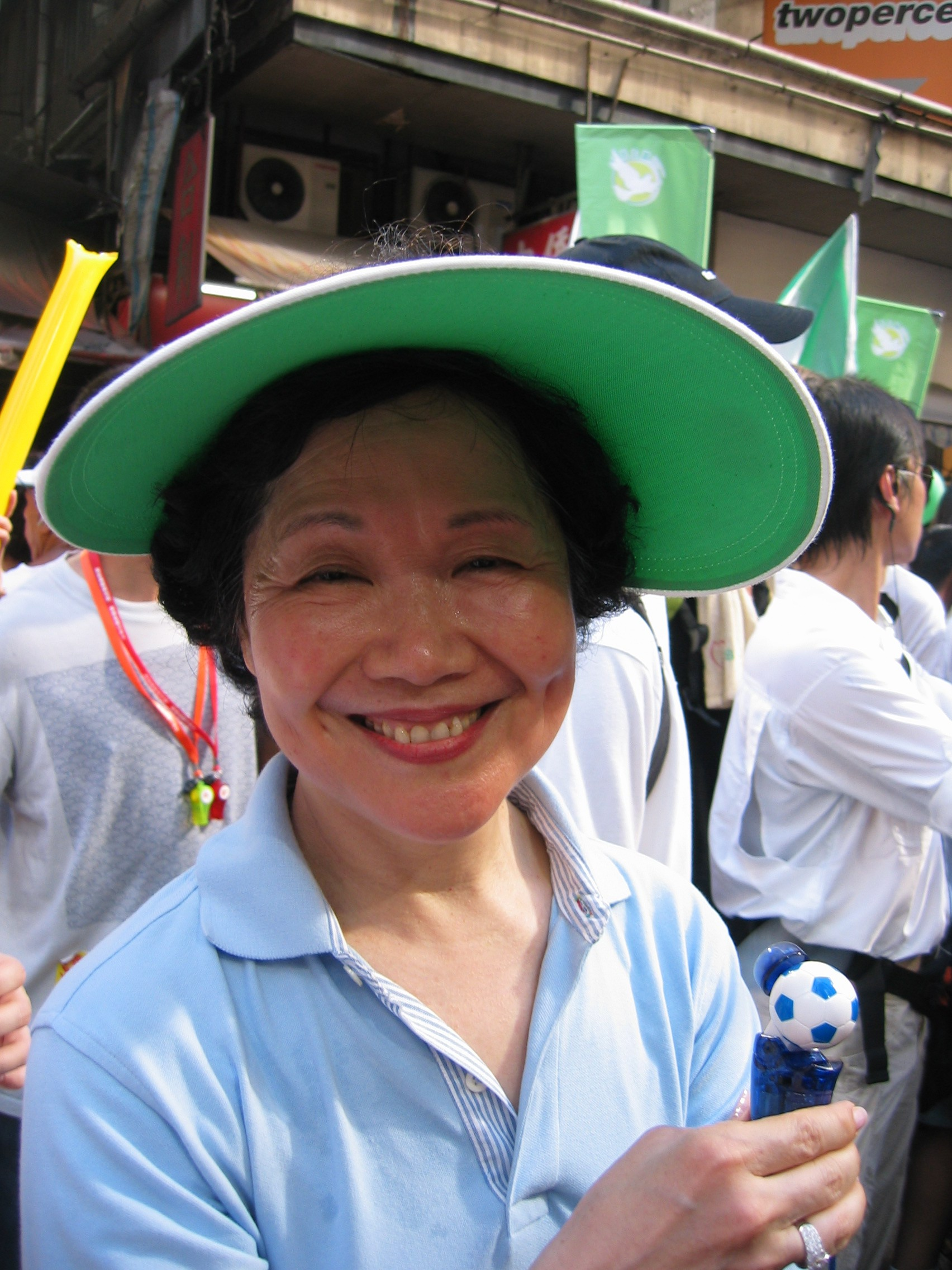
Anson Chan joins the march in 2006.

The theme for the march in 2006 was "Creating Hopes for Universal Suffrage and Democracy With an Equal and Just Hong Kong (平等公義新香港，民主普選創希望)".

Not only did she openly support the implementation of universal suffrage in Hong Kong via the mass media, former Chief Secretary Anson Chan also called on Hong Kongers to express their desire by taking to the street. Some saw the move as Chan testing the water, paving way to the next chief executive election. Chan declined to comment until she formally announced that she has no interests in running for chief executive in September.

Like previous years, counter-protest parade was held in the morning while the protest organised by the Civil Human Rights Front started at 15:00 the same day, marching from Victoria Park to Central Government Offices. 58,000 people took part in the protest this year, according to the organiser and the demonstration ended at about 19:00 peacefully.

== 2007 ==
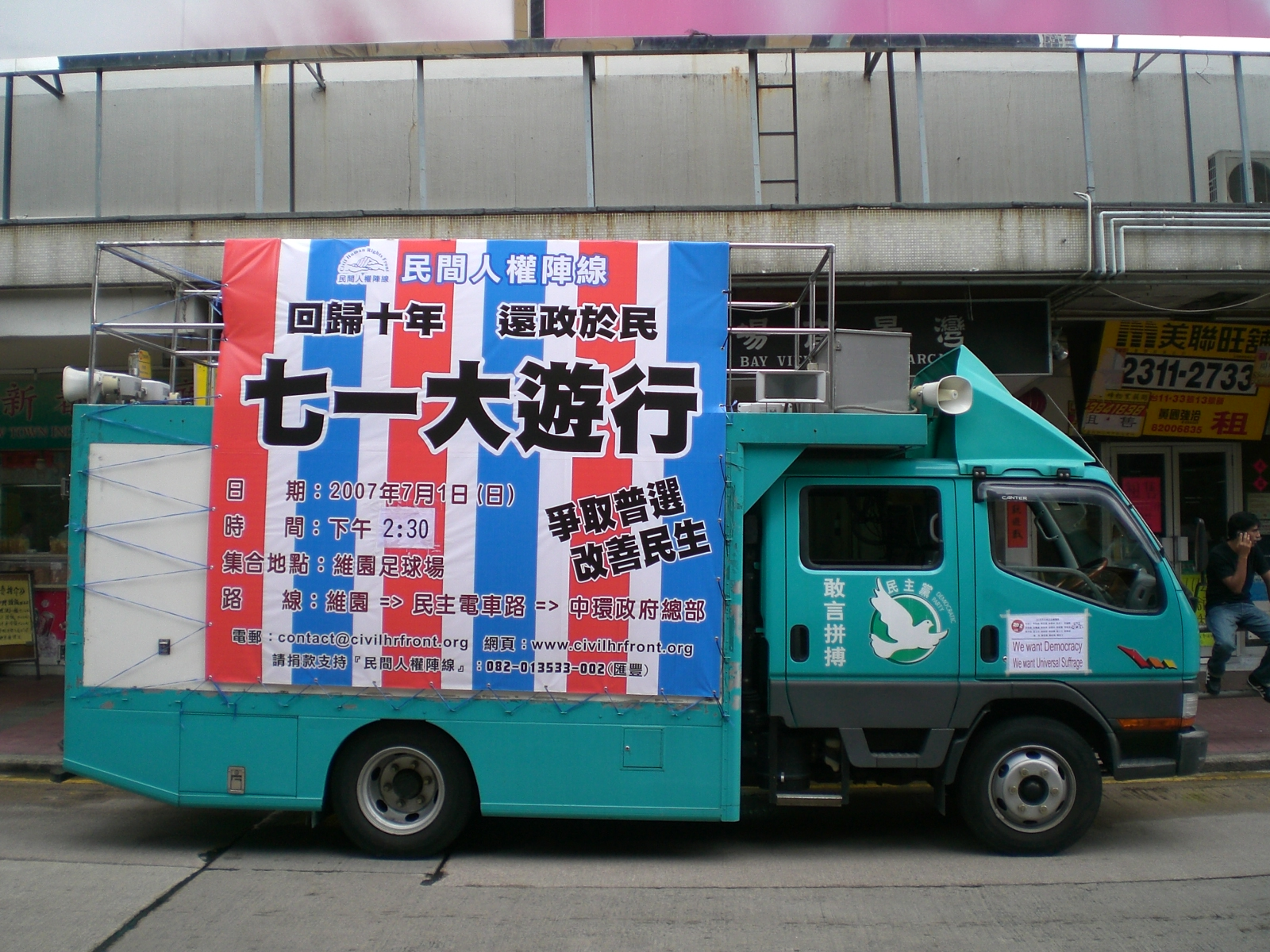
A truck promoting 1 July marches

"Achieving Universal Suffrage, Improving Livelihood (爭取普選，改善民生)" was the theme for this year's demonstration. The organiser, Civil Human Rights Front, submitted an application for Notification of Public Procession to the Hong Kong Police (HKP) about twenty days before the march. Prior to the start of the protest, Chinese Communist Party General Secretary Hu Jintao had already left Hong Kong via the Shenzhen bay port.

The police insisted that the organisers wrapped up the demonstration before 18:30 to facilitate the fireworks display that would take place that night over Victoria Harbour. Displeased with by the limitations and restrictions set by the police, the organisers filed an appeal to the Appeal Board, which ruled on 26 June that the demonstration could last for four hours, from 14.30 to 18:30. Furthermore, the appeal board also required the police to open up all three westbound lanes to marchers. The elder and physically challenged marchers would slack behind at the rally, and restricted the number of wheelchair participants to ten.

Civil Human Rights Front estimated the turn out to be 68,000 while the Hong Kong Police put the figure with those who left from Victoria Park between 14:30 to 16:30 at 20,000. The University of Hong Kong estimated between 29,000 and 35,000 people took place in the demonstration. Organisers suggested an estimate of 58,000 people.

Cardinal Joseph Zen joined the march for the first time. Former Chief Secretary, Anson Chan has also taken part.

== 2008 ==
Organisers said more than 40,000 people attended. Police put the starting figure at 13,000 when the march began. One of the issues include Chief executive Donald Tsang, who was under fire for the hiring of his 17 new highly paid appointees. Critics say they were handpicked allies brought in to boost his power base. Protest turnout for the year was expected to be less, with no pressing issues to be resolved.

== 2009 ==
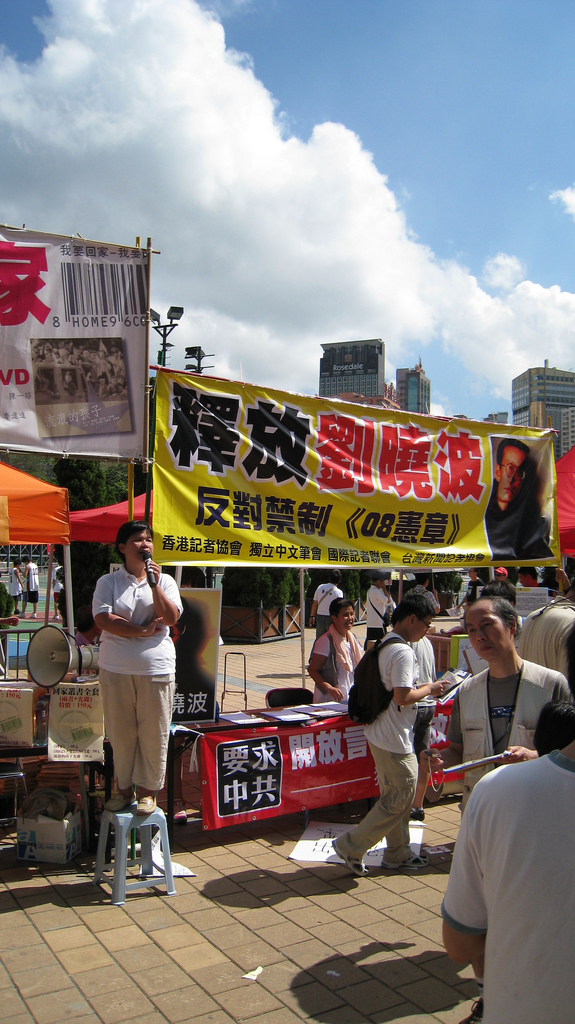
Protesters oppose the arrest of Liu Xiaobo, founder of Charter 08.

Pan-democrats had expected at least 100,000 to take the streets for the march. Previously the 20th anniversary of the 1989 Tiananmen Square protests and massacre at Hong Kong Victoria Park had a large turnout to commemorate the event. Seven different events were expected to attract a total of 130,000 participants, as it was supposed to be the largest number of protests in a single day on Hong Kong island. A "unity parade" was organised by the pro-Beijing camp in the morning at Hong Kong Stadium. This celebrated the 12th anniversary of Hong Kong's return to China since 1997. Xinhua News Agency also set up a website to commemorate the event. The spectacle was matched with stadium performances as well as sports car displays on the streets. Other events include protests by the Alliance of Lehman Brothers victims and one by the handicapped protesting at discrimination. chief executive Donald Tsang led senior government officials at the flag-raising ceremony at Wan Chai Golden Bauhinia Square. The police band followed by a sea parade and fly-past by the disciplined services. The 2009 Hong Kong Broadcasting Authority forum followed on 14 July to talk about broadcast freedom.

== 2010 ==
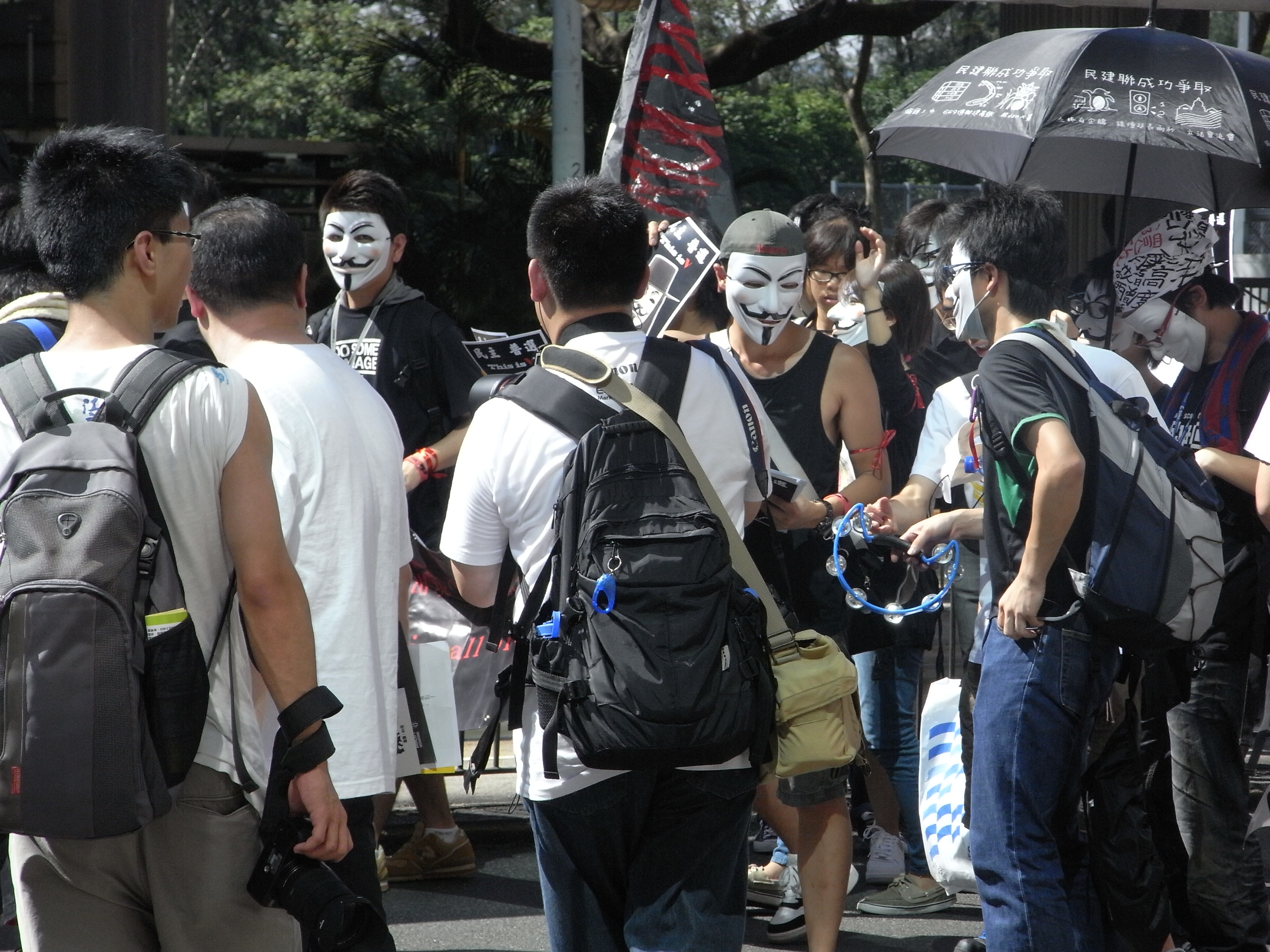
Protesters wearing the "Guy Fawkes masks" from V for Vendetta for protest, a new trend in 2010

Previously the pan-democracy camp was united in their goal to fight for universal suffrage for the city of 7 million people in 2012 and nothing less. After the consultation document for selecting the Chief exec and Legco politicians was passed in late June, there was no more universal suffrage. Instead, Beijing signed an alternative method to choose the CE and Legco politicians. A controversial graffiti incident even took place after the consultations.

The pan-democrat camp was split. Several hundred democratic party members faced verbal abuse throughout the march to the HK government headquarters for selling out to Beijing. Protesters hurling chants of "Shame on you" and "You betrayed Hong Kong people." About 52,000 people took part in the protest. A 2,000-person anniversary parade was organised by opposition pro-government groups. Two weeks after the protests, many have questioned the state of the Democratic party and whether protests are of any use, especially since HK is not a place where citizens make decisions for themselves. Party chairman Albert Ho publicly responded "Even if you replaced Donald Tsang with another chief, you still have to deal with the People's Liberation Army, which is another type of power.

== 2011 ==
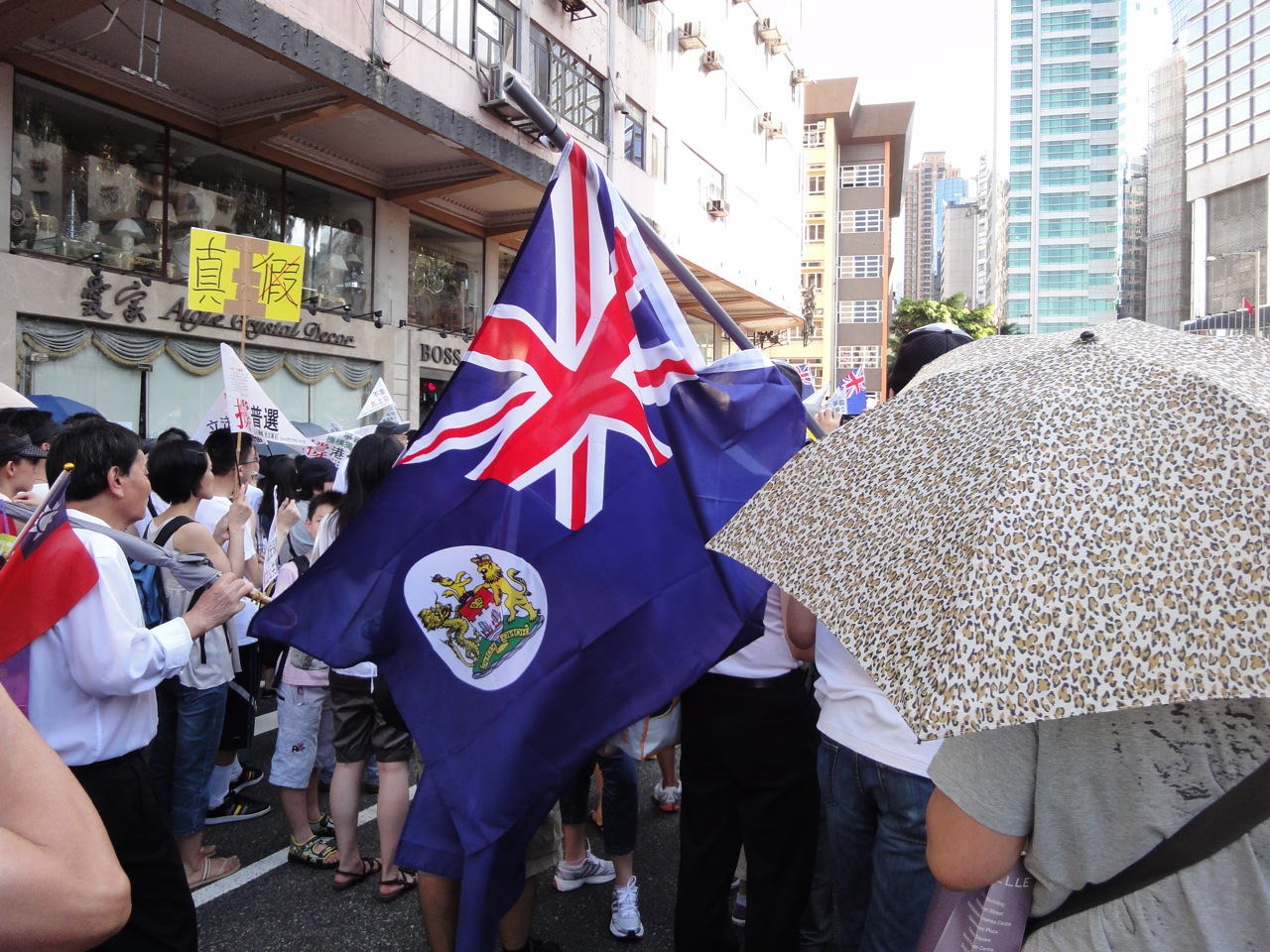
Hong Kong 1 July march with British Hong Kong flags

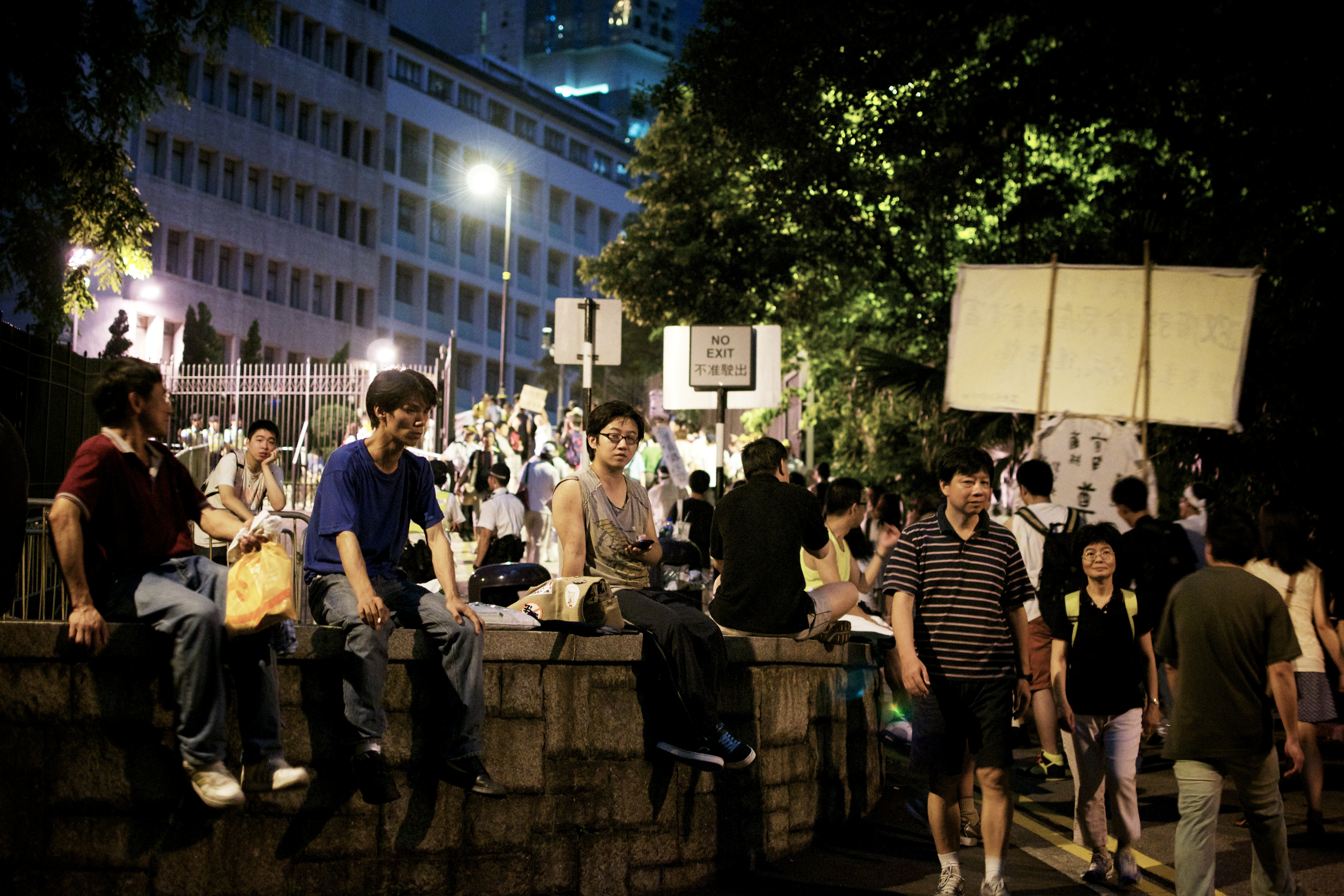
Protesters reach the Government Headquarters.

The turnout for the 2011 protest was the highest since 2004. Organisers of the protest claimed a turnout of 218,000 people. There were quite a number of issues. Just two days before the protest, the government led by Stephen Lam tried to pass a bill to no longer allow by-elections, to block any more events similar to the Five Constituencies referendum. There were demands for Donald Tsang to step down, and bring in universal suffrage to both the 2012 chief executive and Legco election.

There were complaints with land hogging and control by real estate companies. Unionists portrayed real estate tycoon Li Ka-shing as the devil. Other groups carried coffins to represent the small homes poor people live in. Hawkers complained about the high property rent that made it impossible to run their business.

There were complaints of allowing more women from mainland China to give birth in Hong Kong. There were also people against the introduction of "Patriotic education (國民教育)" in primary and high schools in the special administrative region. Just a few days ago, 22 top HK schools rejected the plan, claiming they were against this type of "brain wash education". The post-90s generation were quite against this. During the protest about 228 protesters at Connaught Road were arrested.

On 13 July People Power group led a three-day sit-in to protest against Stephen Lam, the blocking of by-elections and a number of issues. About 1000 people put on handcuffs and surrounded the Legco building 3 times to protest police actions from 1 July march. Hundreds of people also threw paper aeroplanes at the Legco building with political messages.

== 2012 ==
The 2012 protest on 1 July was the largest yet, with activists claiming 400,000 took part and police claiming 63,000 took part, both of which would have been the largest attendance at 1 July protests. These protests coincided with the 15th anniversary of the handover of Hong Kong attended by CPC General Secretary Hu Jintao and his swearing in of new chief executive CY Leung, who is alleged to be a closet member of the Chinese Communist Party, and has conflicts of interests over his business interests and has had unauthorised building work at his home.

In addition, the widening gap between the rich and poor, with 20% of the city living in poverty, an influx of mothers from mainland China, continued denial of universal suffrage to all individuals and suppression of freedom of speech in the Mainland featured in the protests.

According to the University of Hong Kong, only 34% of locals said they are proud of being Chinese citizens, the lowest figure since 2001. Many protesters waved the British Hong Kong flag, showing resentment of the post-handover situation.

Following the protests, a human rights group based in the city, the Chinese People's Rights Alliance claimed that disguised mainland Chinese security police followed and harassed them. It also alleged that several mainlander protesters have gone missing once returning home to mainland China.

== 2013 ==
The 1 July protest in 2013 focused on universal suffrage and other major issues. The Civil Human Rights Front, organiser of the annual march, said 430,000 people took part on Monday, compared to 400,000 last year. But police said just 35,500 left Victoria Park and 66,000 participated at its peak. The University of Hong Kong's public opinion programme estimated 93,000 took part.

== 2014 ==
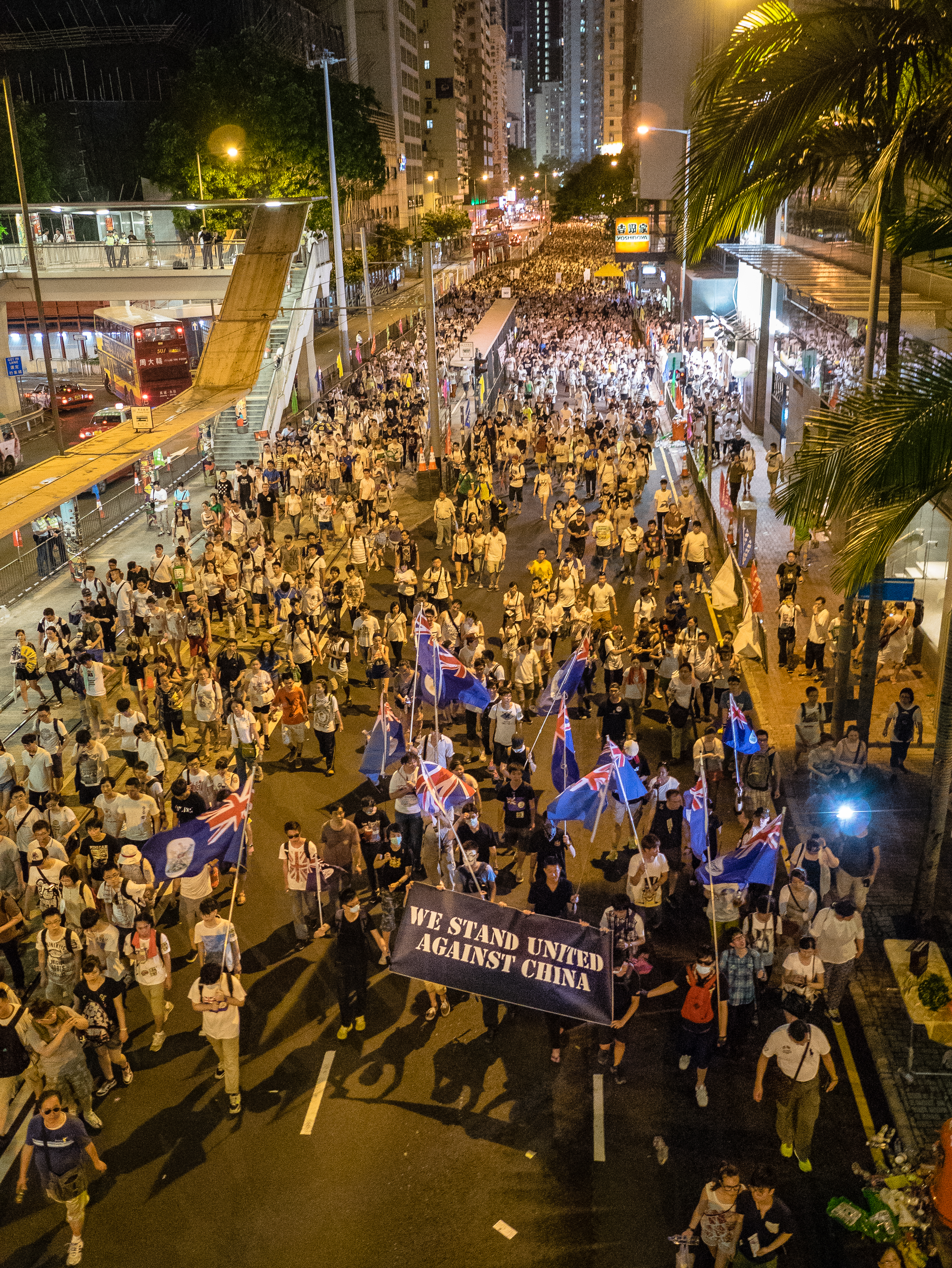
1 July March in Hong Kong in 2014

Before the protests, a white paper by the Chinese government proclaimed that Hong Kong does not enjoy full autonomy, and that Hong Kong's high degree of autonomy was granted by the Chinese government. The departure in wording from emphasising the high degree of autonomy guaranteed by the Hong Kong Basic Law sparked controversy that the Chinese government was suggesting it could intervene in Hong Kong affairs, in effect redefining one country, two systems. The Hong Kong government earlier promised to residents that they will be able to vote for their new chief executive in the upcoming 2017 election, but it has been feared that the final process will favour candidates approved by Beijing.

On 1 July 2014, organisers said over 500,000 protesters marched along the streets of Hong Kong, while city officials estimated 100,000. 5,000 police officers were present, and a large amount of the demonstrators present were arrested for illegal assembly during another protest the day after.

== 2015 ==
On 1 July, approximately 48,000 protesters marched to mark an anniversary of the British 1997 turnover of Hong Kong to China. The protesters call for "full democracy" and Leung Chun-ying's resignation as the city's leader. This protest had one of the lowest turnout in recent years, due to it being held after the veto of the 2014–15 Hong Kong electoral reform. The reform consultation process had sparked massive protests and widespread civil disobedience movements, including the Umbrella Revolution, and organisers of the 2015 July 1 March recognised that many democratically minded people preferred to rest after the controversial reform package had been stopped.

== 2016 ==
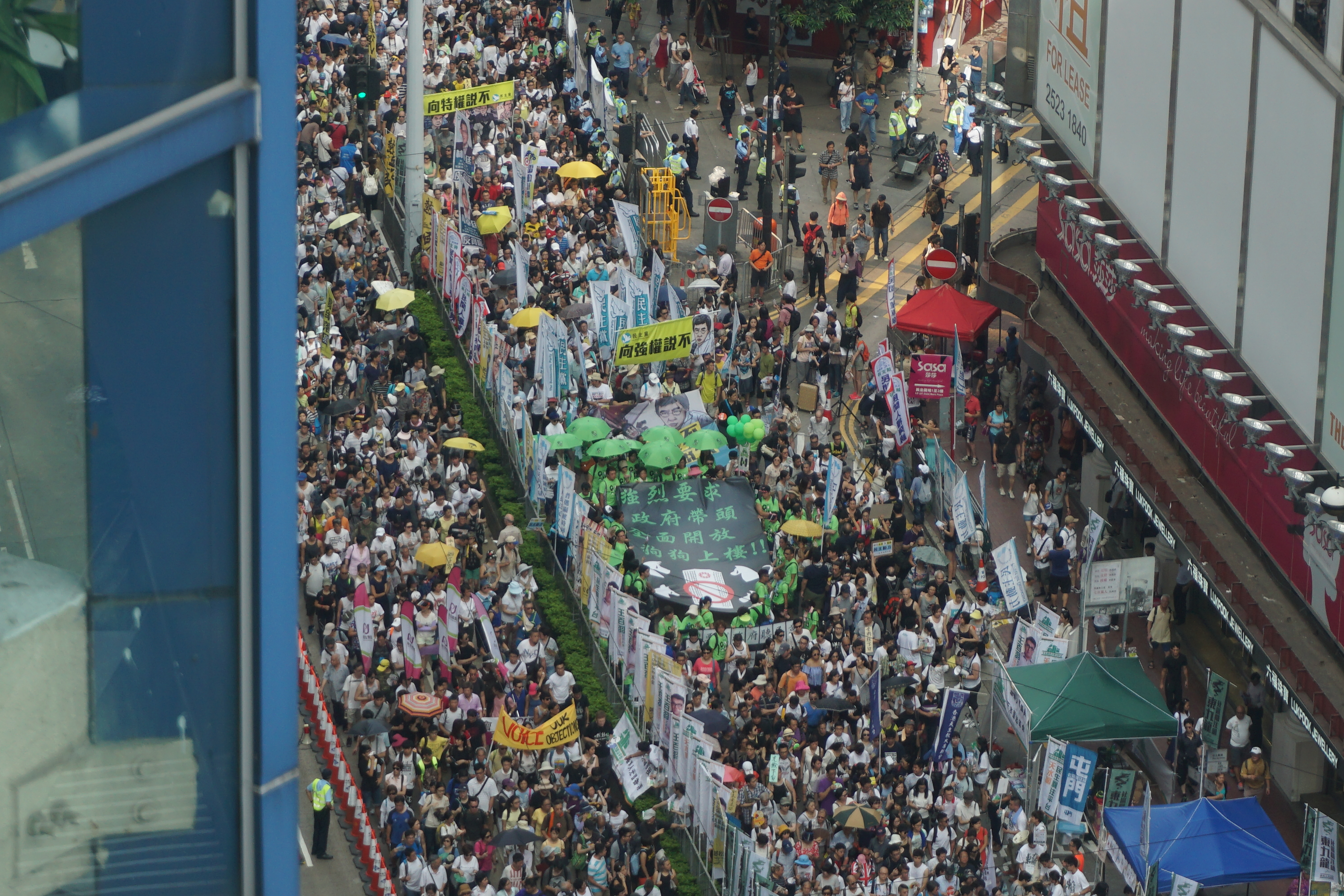
Hong Kong 1 July marches in 2016

Organisers claim that around 110,000 people turned up to protest for various causes, but police claimed 19,300 joined the protest rally.

== 2017 ==
Organisers claim that around 66,000 people turned up to protest for various causes, but police claimed 14,500 joined the protest rally.

== 2018 ==
Organisers claim that around 50,000 people turned up to protest for various causes, but police claimed 9,800 joined the protest rally.

== 2019 ==
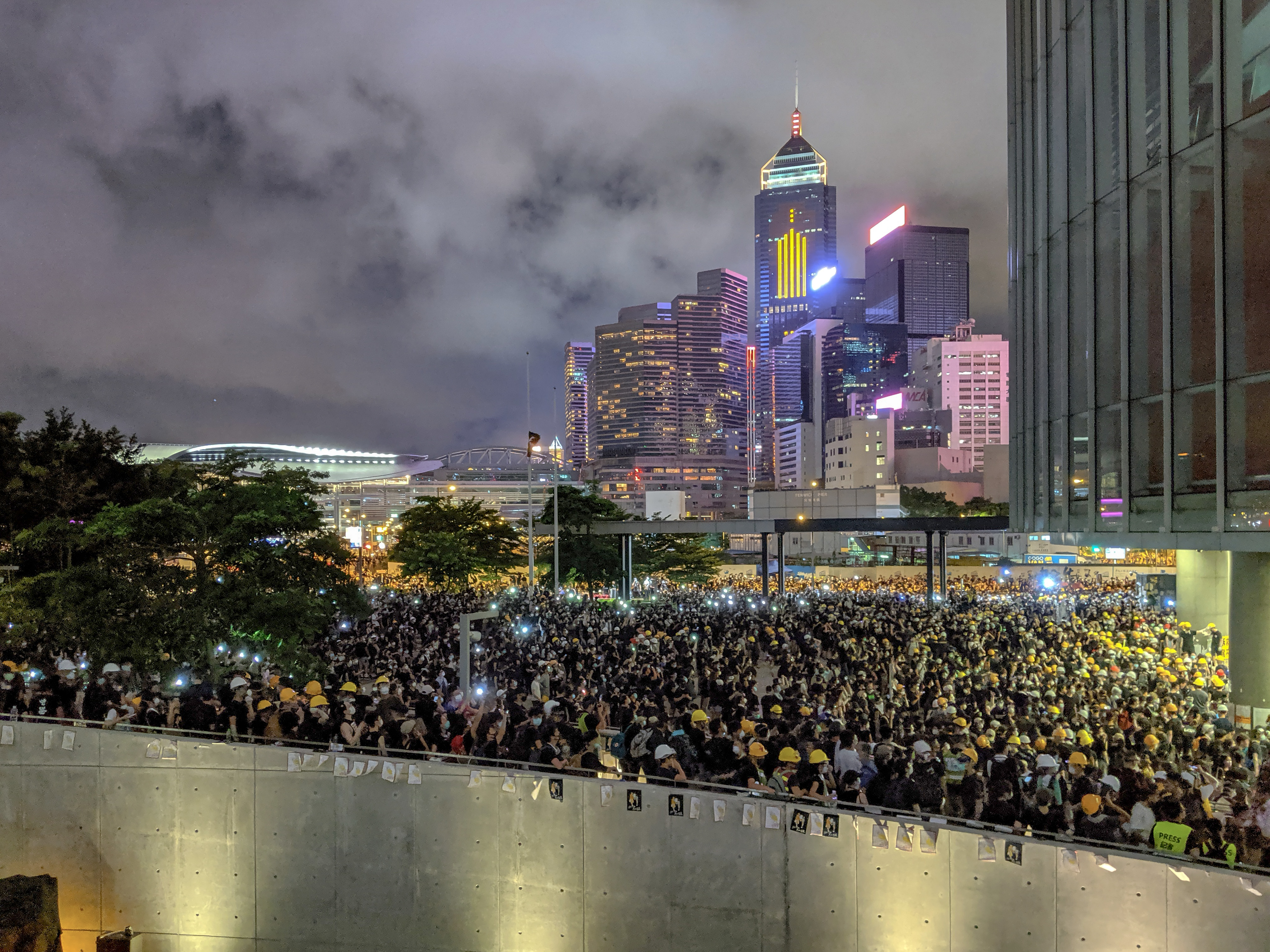
Hong Kong anti-extradition law protest on 1 July 2019

The 1 July marches coincided with the ongoing anti-extradition bill protests. Organisers claim that around 550,000 people turned up to protest, a record breaking turnout as the organisers claimed. However, police claimed 190,000 joined the protest rally. Researchers combining artificial intelligence and statistical counting techniques reported an initial count of 265,000 people marched, and an adjusted total of 276,970 was published a peer-reviewed journal. Independent polling organisation, PORI, estimated attendance at 260,000. Reuters counted the number of protestors at one location over 15-minute periods during the march and came to an estimate of 227,000 people in total.

Before the march, youths had begun besieging the Legislative Council building. The march was later diverted to Chater Road in Central due to the people amassed in front of the Legislative Council.

At around 9 pm local time, hundreds of protesters stormed the legislature after breaking through the glass walls and metal doors of the building. Protesters caused extensive damage by ransacking the premises, damaging portraits of former pro-Beijing presidents of the Legislative Council, and smashing furniture. Protesters spray-painted slogans, hung up signs and erected barricades. The police started using tear gas to disperse protesters around the LegCo at 12:05 am, and reached the building 15 minutes later.

By early 5 July, there had been at least 66 arrests and first formal charges laid in connection with the incident.

== 2020 ==
Despite a ban from the police, tens of thousands of protesters showed up alongside heavy police presence in Causeway Bay, Wan Chai, and Tin Hau, and lingered in the area for almost six hours to voice their objection against the newly implemented national security law. The police responded by deploying water cannon at journalists and protesters and dispersed many tear gas and pepper balls. A journalist was knocked down by a police water cannon truck. Police made more than 370 arrests, among which at least ten were due to alleged violation of the new law.

== 2021 and demise ==
On 1 July 2021, police deployed in large numbers to prevent protests, and performed checks on passers-by, after it had placed a ban on public assemblies citing restrictions due to the COVID-19 pandemic. On that day, a man stabbed a police officer and then killed himself; the police officer survived. At least 20 people were arrested, about a dozen of them for distributing leaflets alleged to be "seditious". The Civil Human Rights Front, the organizer of the protests for two decades, disbanded in August 2021.

== See also ==
- Politics of Hong Kong
- List of politics-related topics
- Hong Kong new year marches
- 20th anniversary of the 1989 Tiananmen Square protests and massacre
- 2014 Hong Kong protests
- Memorials for the 1989 Tiananmen Square protests and massacre
- 2012 Dual Universal Suffrage (Hong Kong)
