= Act Now (slogan) =

Slogan proposed for the 2010 Hong Kong electoral reform

Act Now (in Chinese: 起錨, literally "set sail") is a slogan proposed by the Chief Executive of Hong Kong, Donald Tsang Yam-kuen, on May 29, 2010, with the meaning of "it's time to take action". It served as the theme for the promotion of the 2012 political reform proposal. In the logo of "Act Now", the color blue represents the ocean, and the stroke of the Chinese character "起" resembles a ship sailing in the sea, symbolizing setting sail and embarking on a journey. The slogan aimed to encourage Hong Kong citizens to support the political reform proposal put forward by the government in 2012. However, some opponents changed "起錨" ("Act Now") to "超错" ("All Wrong") to express their dissatisfaction. After about a month of "Act Now" promotion, the proposal was ultimately approved on June 24 and 25.

== Background ==
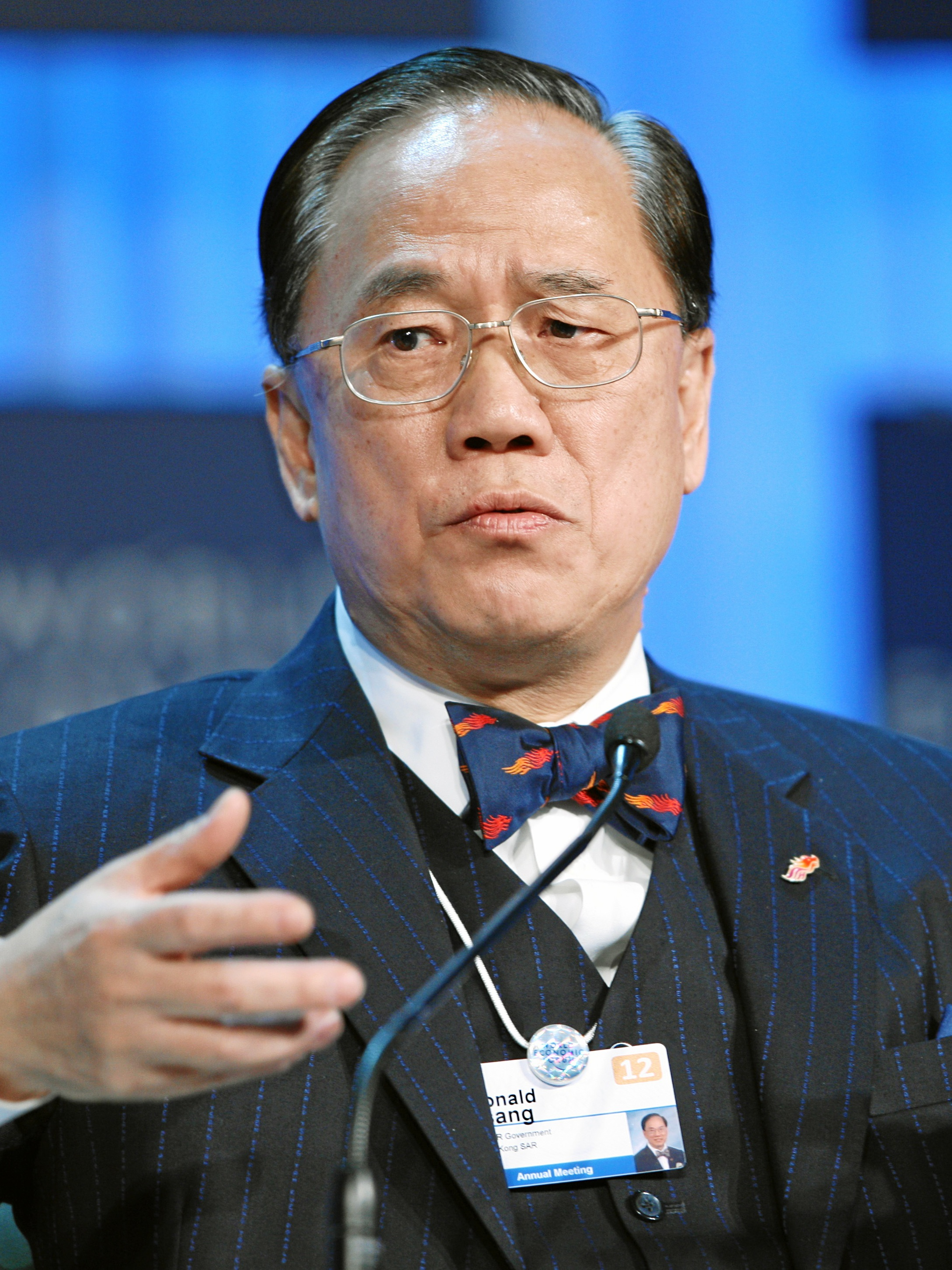
At the time, Donald Tsang Yam-kuen was the Chief Executive of Hong Kong.

After the rejection of the political reform proposal in 2005, although the Hong Kong government published a Green Paper on constitutional development in 2007, Subsequently, the pan-democrats initiated the Umbrella Movement in 2012 to rally public support. Two months later, the Standing Committee of the National People's Congress (NPC) issued the "Decision of the Standing Committee of the National People's Congress on Issues Relating to the Methods for Selecting the Chief Executive of Hong Kong and for Forming the Legislative Council in 2012 and on Issues Relating to Universal Suffrage", rejecting the pan-democrats' proposal for dual universal suffrage in 2012 but stipulating that the Chief Executive election in 2017 and the Legislative Council election in 2020 could be conducted through universal suffrage. On the day the decision was announced, the pan-democrats organized a protest march against the NPC's rejection of universal suffrage, and Democratic Party founding chairman Martin Lee went on a hunger strike in protest. In 2008, the Hong Kong Human Rights Front launched a large-scale march to continue advocating for dual universal suffrage in 2012. In 2009, the Bureau for Constitutional and Mainland Affairs Stephen Lam pointed out the need for a gradual approach to universal suffrage. On November 18, the Hong Kong government released the "Consultation Document on the Methods for Selecting the Chief Executive and for Forming the Legislative Council in 2012", seeking public opinion.

In early 2010, the Power for Democracy and the pan-democrats jointly organized the "Restore Universal Suffrage" New Year's Day march, continuing their advocacy for universal suffrage. Meanwhile, the Civic Party and the League of Social Democrats officially launched the "Five Constituencies Referendum" in an attempt to gain public support through the 2010 Hong Kong Legislative Council by-elections, aiming to achieve the goal of "achieving genuine universal suffrage as soon as possible and abolishing functional constituencies". Eventually, all resigned members returned to the Legislative Council. Subsequently, the Democratic Party, leading the opposition to the resignation plan, along with other pan-democratic members such as the Association for Democracy and People's Livelihood of Hong Kong and the Hong Kong Confederation of Trade Unions, formed the Ultimate Universal Suffrage Alliance. They met with Li Gang, deputy director of the Liaison Office of the Central People's Government in Hong Kong, to seek consensus on issues such as universal suffrage. Later, the Hong Kong government vigorously promoted political reform, releasing several advertisements to promote the reform. Some newspapers also reported that the government would launch the "largest mass movement since the establishment of the Special Administrative Region".

== Propaganda ==
=== First stage of propaganda ===
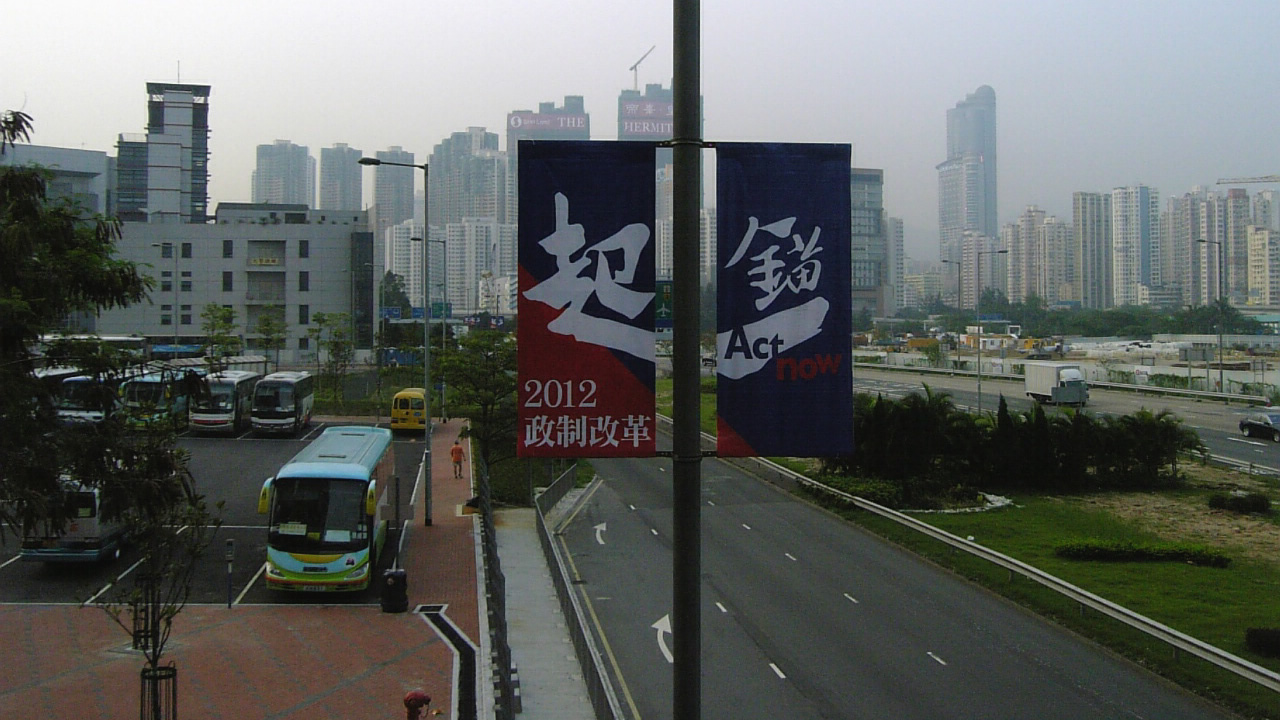
"起锚" (Act Now) street lamp promotional poster.

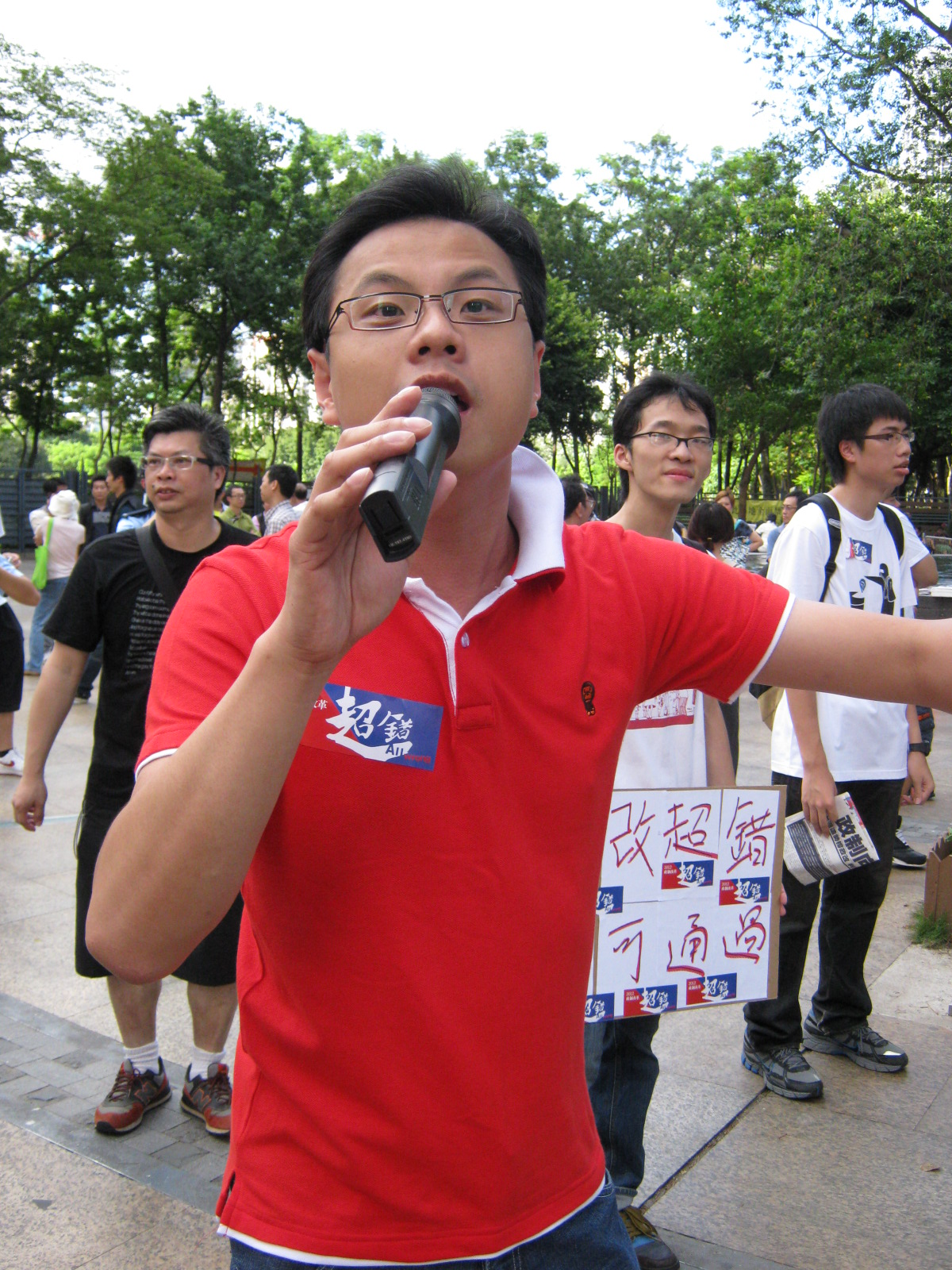
Edward Yum with the "超错" (All Wrong) sticker.

On May 28, 2010, "Act Now" (起錨)advertisements first appeared in various MTR stations. Chief Executive Donald Tsang described Hong Kong as a ship sailing towards the goal of universal suffrage in his "Letter to Hong Kong", vowing that rejecting political reform would waste ten years of effort.

On May 29, Chief Secretary for Administration Henry Tang and Financial Secretary John Tsang wore T-shirts with the words "Act Now" and distributed flyers at Telford Plaza in Kowloon Bay to promote the political reform. Some citizens discarded the received "Act Now" pamphlets in trash bins, while others commented, "Officials can put aside their status to come to the community, showing that the accountability team is doing practical things". Chief Executive Donald Tsang, along with Secretary for the Environment Edward Yau, wore T-shirts with the words "Hong Kong Act Now" and distributed flyers at Pacific Place in Admiralty. During this event, "Victoria Park Big Brother" Edward Yum and former secretary-general of the Hong Kong Federation of Students, Crystal Chow, approached to protest. Some foreigners who received "Act Now" leaflets claimed they would support the political reform but were questioned by Sun Daily about whether it was arranged by the Hong Kong government. Later, Donald Tsang boarded an open-top bus to continue the political reform promotion in Taikoo Shing in Quarry Bay, receiving cheers from some citizens. Subsequently, Tsang and a group of officials arrived in Sha Tin Town Hall but were temporarily surrounded by protesters. Some citizens shouted slogans like "Oppose the bad plan, reject functional constituencies". Chik Pun Shing, a member of the Professional Teachers' Union, questioned John Tsang about how this political reform proposal is more democratic than the previous one. Tsang responded with a simple "Thank you", and when asked what he was thanking for, he replied, "Thank you for being loud", before entering the Sha Tin Town Hall. At that moment, there were no protesters surrounding them, only Chik Pun Shing, John Tsang, and reporters. Some citizens who received flyers questioned Donald Tsang, "Act Now? Where to go after acting?" referring to the destination after taking action, but Tsang did not respond to the question. Later, Tsang met with the media and led a group of officials in shouting the "Act Now" slogan. The officials were laughing and unevenly chanting the slogan, while some remained unresponsive. On the same day, the Hong Kong government established the "Act Now" group on Facebook to promote political reform and released promotional videos featuring three Executive Council members, Rita Lau, Rita Fan, and Ronald Arculli, supporting "Act Now".

On May 30, Donald Tsang appealed to citizens in the radio program "A Letter to Hong Kong", urging them to express their unwillingness for the political system to stand still to their respective district legislators. On May 31, Secretary for Constitutional and Mainland Affairs Stephen Lam attended a special meeting of the Sham Shui Po District Council, chanting slogans such as "Hong Kong, democracy, Act Now". Members of the Democratic Alliance for the Betterment and Progress of Hong Kong and the Alliance for Moving Forward also joined in. Secretary for Justice Wong Yan Lung wore an "Act Now" pin at the award ceremony for the University Student Internship Program to promote political reform. Financial Secretary John Tsang and Political Assistant to the Labour and Welfare Bureau Zandra Mok distributed leaflets in Central. Deputy Secretary for Education Kenneth Chen engaged in discussions with students on the topic of political reform at the HKSYCIA Wong Tai Shan Memorial College.

On June 1, Financial Secretary John Tsang went to the Shun Lee Catholic Secondary School to continue promoting the political reform proposal, encountering teachers raising cardboard signs with the words "超错" (All Wrong) to express opposition. Undersecretary for Commerce and Economic Development Gregory So, Political Assistant to the Secretary for Education Jeremy Young, and Political Assistant to the Secretary for Home Affairs Caspar Tsui distributed "Act Now" leaflets in Wong Tai Sin. Meanwhile, Secretary for Education Michael Suen promoted political reform by wearing an "Act Now" pin at the Po Leung Kuk 60th Year Directors' Lunch held at the Grand Hyatt Hong Kong.

On June 2, Secretary for Transport and Housing Eva Cheng distributed "Act Now" pins at the Temple Centre. Secretary for the Civil Service Denise Yue had his "Act Now" pin upside down while promoting political reform. Secretary for Security Ambrose Lee momentarily forgot to fasten his "Act Now" pin at an event, while Secretary for Development Carrie Lam consistently wore her "Act Now" pin during the same occasion. On June 3, Secretary for Commerce and Economic Development Rita Lau met with District Council Chairman of Tuen Mun Lau Wong-fat and other district councillors to explain the purpose of the "Act Now" campaign and distribute political reform promotional materials in the community. On June 4, Financial Secretary John Tsang promoted "Act Now" at the Hong Kong Institute of Directors luncheon. On June 5, inventor "Son of Stars" Chan Yik-hei, former TVB anchor and traditional Chinese medicine practitioner Dr. Louisa Wong, and Hong Kong football legend Chan Siu Ki called on citizens to support "Act Now" in a new promotional video.

=== Second stage of propaganda ===
On June 6, the Hong Kong government announced a three-route promotional strategy for the political reform. Donald Tsang would first promote it at Kornhill Plaza in Quarry Bay and then move on to Oi Tung Estate shopping mall in Shau Kei Wan. Henry Tang would begin at Festival Walk in Kowloon Tong and later proceed to the West Kowloon Centre in Sham Shui Po. Additionally, John Tsang and Jensen Huang would promote the reform at the Sai Kung Public Pier and Tseung Kwan O MTR Station. While promoting in Quarry Bay, Donald Tsang chanted "Act Now" to garner support for the political reform. However, protesters shouted slogans for universal suffrage, with some even using vulgar language. Due to the chaos, Tsang left without interacting with citizens. In contrast, Secretary for Education Michael Suen successfully avoided protesters and received cheers of "Act Now" from children. In Shau Kei Wan, Tsang used the example of fishermen during their off-season to illustrate the campaign's aim, emphasizing that the ultimate goal of "Act Now" is to achieve democracy. Some citizens applauded in support, while others criticized him as "shameful". Development Bureau Secretary Carrie Lam and Secretary for the Civil Service Paul Tang distributed "Act Now" promotional materials to citizens. Meanwhile, Henry Tang, while promoting in Kowloon Tong, repeatedly shouted "Act Now" and officials, including Secretary for Home Affairs Tsang Tak-sing, Secretary for Labour and Welfare Matthew Cheung, Secretary for the Environment Edward Yau, Secretary for Food and Health York Chow, and Undersecretary for Development Gabriel Leung, distributed "Act Now" leaflets. Protesters continuously responded with chants of "All Wrong", and some even tried to block Tang's departure by lying in front of his convoy. In Sham Shui Po, Tang, along with several officials, shouted "Act Now" multiple times, and again, protesters attempted to block his departure by lying in front of his convoy. Additionally, John Tsang, upon arriving in Sai Kung, received a persimmon from a member of the League of Social Democrats, Chin Wai-lok, as a sarcastic gesture. Despite wearing "Act Now" T-shirts, both John Tsang and Wong Yan Lung faced boos from citizens while using a loudspeaker to urge support for political reform in Tseung Kwan O. Supporters and opponents of the political reform surrounded them, chanting "Act Now" and "All Wrong" respectively. Liberal Party District Councillor Christine Fong Kwok-shan also assisted in promoting. Secretary for Security Ambrose Lee, Secretary for Transport and Housing Eva Cheng, Undersecretary for Transport and Housing Yau Shing-mu, and Secretary for Financial Services and the Treasury Chan Ka-keung distributed "Act Now" leaflets nearby. Some citizens and their children responded by shouting, "Support political reform, don't stand still on the political system!".

=== Third stage of propaganda ===
On June 8, Wong Yan Lung, wearing the "Act Now" lapel pin, went to Lok Sin Tong Young Ko Hsiao Lin Secondary School to promote the political reform. Protesters affixed "All Wrong" stickers to his vehicle. On June 10, Financial Secretary John Tsang distributed "Act Now" lapel pins at a luncheon organized by the Hong Kong Institute of Certified Public Accountants to promote the political reform. In the evening, wearing "Act Now" T-shirts, Donald Tsang went to visit homes in Clague Garden State in Tsuen Wan to sell the political reform. Democratic Alliance for the Betterment and Progress of Hong Kong District Councilor Chan Kam-lam cleared the way for him, while League of Social Democrats members protested along the route by chanting "All Wrong". However, some citizens expressed support for the political reform. At the same time, John Tsang, Matthew Cheung, Frankie Yip Kan-chuen, and Zandra Mok went door-to-door in Kwun Tong's Hiu Lai Court to promote the political reform. While some citizens expressed support by chanting, "Secretary, we support you! Support political reform! Act Now! Act Now!" others, including a teacher, raised signs protesting against the functional constituencies. Additionally, Wong Yan Lung, along with Economic Development Bureau Secretary Gregory So and Undersecretary Rita Lau, visited homes in Southern District's Shek Pai Wan Estate to promote the political reform. Some citizens criticized the effort as a waste of resources and questioned the need for secrecy.

On June 11, Jack So, Deputy Secretary for the Environment Kitty Poon, and Chief Executive's Office Special Assistant Ronald Chan Ngok-pang distributed "Act Now" promotional items in Mei Foo. On June 12, Matthew Cheung wore the "Act Now" lapel pin to promote the political reform at an event related to children's development. On June 13, Secretary for Home Affairs Tsang Tak-sing delivered a speech at the 2010 Eastern District Dragon Boat Race, urging support for the political reform. Undersecretary for Transport and Housing Yau Shing-mu delivered a speech at the Discovery Bay Dragon Boat Opening, calling for support for the political reform. In addition, Donald Tsang and his wife, Selina Tsang, distributed "Act Now" leaflets in Shau Kei Wan, Wan Chai's Tai Yuen Street, and Aberdeen Street in Central to promote the political reform. Although some citizens expressed hope for progress in the political system, Apple Daily questioned whether the government was filtering out all opposing voices.

On June 15, the government released a new "Act Now" promotional video featuring Executive Council members Anna Wu, Ronald Arculli, Edward Leong and Anthony Cheung. Gregory So visited Cheung Chau to promote the political reform. Secretary for Education Michael Suen described the purpose of the "Act Now" campaign at a Tung Wah Group of Hospitals luncheon, stating that it aimed to raise public awareness and engage in constructive discussions to garner support. On June 16, Donald Tsang went to Tai Po Waterfront Park to watch a dragon boat race and chanted "Act Now" to promote the political reform. Some Democratic Party members petitioned him to withdraw the reform, while others expressed hope for progress in the political system. During the dragon boat races held in Sha Tin, Donald Tsang urged citizens, saying, "Let's unite and set sail ("act now"), heading towards the goal of universal suffrage". Some participants felt that the "Act Now" campaign was excessively promoted, negatively impacting the festive atmosphere. Additionally, during the dragon boat races in Sai Kung, Henry Tang distributed "Act Now" lapel pins to promote political reform, and some participants enthusiastically shouted "Act Now".

On June 17, Donald Tsang called "Act Now" to promote the political reform at the celebration of the 13th anniversary of Hong Kong's return to China and the 21st anniversary of the establishment of the Hong Kong Federation of Friends. Donald Tsang, wearing the "Act Now" lapel pin, debated with Civic Party leader Audrey Eu on the political reform plan. On June 19, wearing "Act Now" T-shirts, Donald Tsang and various government officials attended the "Support Political Reform" march organized by the Alliance for the Advancement of the Political System. Democratic Alliance for the Betterment and Progress of Hong Kong Chairman Tam Yiu-chung led participants in chanting "Act Now" to show support for the political reform. During the march, League of Social Democrats members, including Leung Kwok-hung and Gavin Kwai, threw black balloons with "All Wrong" written on them toward the protesters. On June 21, Donald Tsang and Michael Suen, both wearing "Act Now" lapel pins, attended the memorial service for the late husband of former Secretary for Constitutional Affairs Anson Chan, Archibald Tai-Wing, at the Cathedral of the Immaculate Conception on Caine Road. On June 23, Chief Executive-elect Leung Chun-ying, Executive Council members Ronald Arculli, Laura Cha, various undersecretaries, and political assistants wore "Act Now" lapel pins to attend a Legislative Council meeting, showing their support for political reform. The Legislative Council security requested them to remove the "Act Now" lapel pins, citing political neutrality as the reason.

== Evaluation ==
=== Positive opinions ===
- Rita Lau, the Secretary for Commerce and Economic Development, described the "Act Now" campaign as a successful means of capturing the public's attention on political reform.
- Chief Secretary for Administration, Henry Tang, stated that the purpose of "Act Now" is to set the democratic ship sailing in 2012, navigating towards the destinations of universal suffrage in 2017 and 2020, overcoming challenges along the way.
- Hong Kong Commercial Daily's editorial commended the term "Act Now" as a vivid and appropriate metaphor for advancing the political system.
- Samuel Yung, Founding President of the Hong Kong Professionals and Senior Executives Association, commented that "Act Now" is an excellent starting point.
- Jasper Tsang Yok-sing, President of the Legislative Council and member of the Democratic Alliance for the Betterment and Progress of Hong Kong (DAB), referred to "Act Now" as embodying the spirit of accountability, representing a positive beginning.
- Executive Council Member Edward Leong expressed that "Act Now" helps in explaining the proposals to the public.
- Kwong-Lam Lee, Vice-chairman of the Hong Kong General Chamber of Commerce, described the role of "Act Now" as a reminder that Hong Kong has already wasted a considerable amount of time on this issue (referring to political reform).
- Sung Lap-Kung, Academic Coordinator of the College of Professional and Continuing Education at City University of Hong Kong, described the second "Act Now" action as a noticeable improvement over the first.
- NPC Standing Committee member Rita Fan praised the "Act Now" campaign and hoped that officials would continue to engage with the community, as avoiding this might lead to resentment among protesters.
- Lei Gong, deputy director of the Liaison Office of the Central People's Government, stated that "Act Now" embodies the sincerity of the SAR government's desire to take a step forward in advancing Hong Kong's political system.
- National Committee of the Chinese People's Political Consultative Conference (CPPCC) member Lung Zi-ming believed that the second wave of "Act Now" received a warm welcome and applause from the public.
- Secretary for Constitutional and Mainland Affairs, Stephen Lam, emphasized that the "Act Now" campaign allows for the collection of public opinions and direct interaction with citizens.
- Executive Council Member Edward Leong expressed that the high-ranking officials going into the community to promote the campaign provides more opportunities for the public to understand the proposals, and the "Act Now" slogan has deeply resonated with the people.
- Under Secretary for Home Affairs, Wong Yan-lung, believed that the "Act Now" campaign could raise public awareness and concern about political reform.
- Former Hong Kong CPPCC member Choi Tak-ho stated that "Act Now" is a reflection of the innovative and vibrant approach of the SAR government in actively promoting new policies.
- Donald Tsang described the slogan "Act Now" as a long-term movement, reminding Hong Kong residents to keep moving forward constantly. He also believed that "Act Now" could fundamentally change the political ecology of Hong Kong.
- Democratic Party legislator Andrew Cheng thought that Donald Tsang's chanting of "Act Now" was comparable to Democratic Party member Albert Chan.
- Hong Kong General Chamber of Commerce President Yeung Chi Keung expressed that the "Act Now" campaign demonstrates the sincerity of promoting political reform through body language.

=== Negative opinions ===
- Lo Zi-gin, a public affairs consultant, believes that the chaos caused by the "起錨" ("Act Now") campaign is not beneficial to the public. Due to the large number of protesters, it increases the security risks for officials, and it is not a good demonstration of governance. He suggests that the government should not use this method to promote political reform in the districts.
- Democratic Party legislator Cheung Man-kwong expressed disinterest in the "Act Now" campaign.
- Former Secretary for Home Affairs Patrick Ho describes "Act Now" as a demonstration that explains the political reform ship is ready to set sail but questions where it is heading.
- Lee Cheuk-yan, a legislator from the Hong Kong Confederation of Trade Unions, sees "Act Now" ("set sail") as "dropping anchor".
- Columnist Lai Pui-fan describes the sound of "Act Now" as hair-raising.
- The chairman of the Hong Kong Alliance, Szeto Wah, directly criticized: The slogan '起錨 should be changed to '起茅' (茅 in Cantonese meaning dishonest).
- Former Hong Kong delegate to the National People's Congress, Ng Hong-mun, criticizes: '起錨' is just a 'show'."
- Legislators from the Democratic Party, including James To, Andrew Cheng, and Kam Nai-wai, marched from the government headquarters to Government House, chanting slogans such as "Freedom is thrown anchor! How does democracy set sail?".
- Former legislator Ng Chi-sum believes that in the "Act Now" campaign, Donald Tsang is "both wanting the limelight and fearing it".
- Chief Executive, Donald Tsang himself, believes that "起錨" ("Act Now") and "超錯" ("All Wrong") (超錯 - "超" sounds like "五" which means five, and "錯" sounds like "二" which means two) are 90% similar. He responded with the phrase "零五超錯，一二起錨" (in 2005, it was "All Wrong", in 2012, it's "Act Now"), playing on the phonetic similarity between "超錯" and the numbers "五" and "二," and "起錨" and the numbers "一" and "二".
- The Oriental Daily criticizes "Set Sail" ("Act Now") as "likely to capsize the ship this time".
- Wong Kwok-hing, a legislator from the Hong Kong Federation of Trade Unions, criticizes the "Act Now" campaign, stating that it not only damages the communication atmosphere between the Liaison Office and moderate democrats but also makes the public only pay attention to the voices opposing political reform, causing various concerns.
- Liberal Party Chairman Miriam Lau believes that "Act Now" intensifies social conflicts and divisions.
- Civic Party legislator Tanya Chan criticizes "Act," saying it is "not only 'All Wrong' but also a 'All Waste' (超浪費, 浪費 means waste).
- Democratic Party legislator Lee Wing-tat describes the home visits in the "Act Now" campaign as "not representative".
- Hong Kong Journalists Association Chairwoman Mak Yin-ting criticizes Donald Tsang during the "Act Now" campaign for "not notifying the media about district promotion, allowing the public to only see voices supporting him".
- Former Director-General of Investment Promotion Michael Rowse describes "Act Now" as a "stupid slogan".
- Legislator Lam Tai-fai believes that "Act Now" is a "hard-selling tactic".
- Legislator Li Fung-ying from the Confederation of Trade Unions criticizes the "Act Now" campaign for "exacerbating social conflicts and divisions".
- Legislator Regina Ip, from the Savantas Policy Institute, describes the "Act Now" campaign as a "complete failure in promoting political reform".

== Impact ==
=== Terminology ===
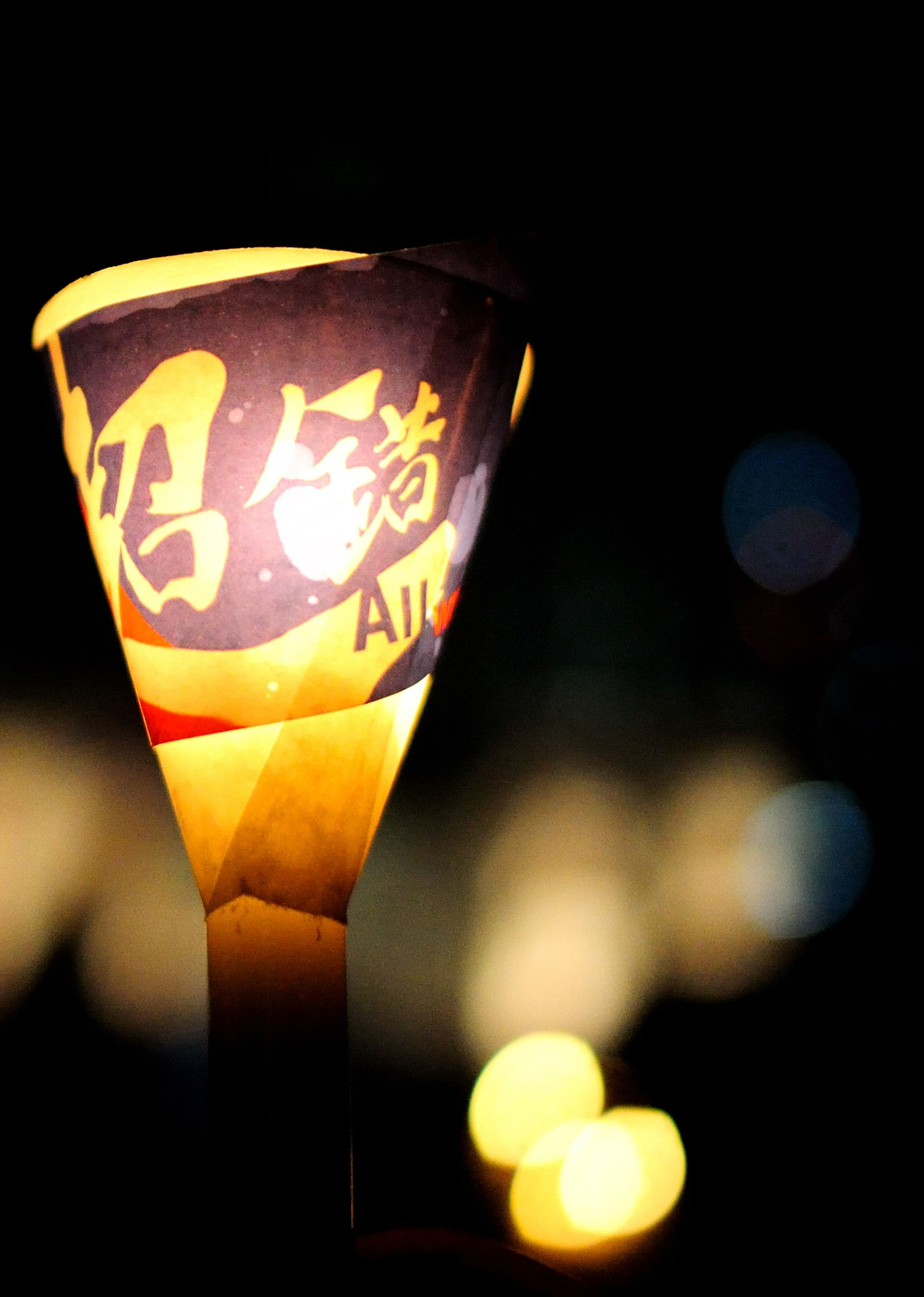
Candlelight: "超錯" ("All Wrong")

The term "起錨" proposed by Donald Tsang has become a trendy phrase in Hong Kong. Legislator Regina Ip from the Professional Forum wrote an article titled "Political reform needs to anchor; public opinion needs respect" in support of the political reform in Wen Wei Po. During protests, demonstrators chanted "起錨, 起錨" ("Act Now, Act Now") when they were obstructed by the police, seeking a way forward. In addition, Democratic Party legislator Nelson Wong expressed that the government's services for people with disabilities also need to "起錨" ("set sail").

Democratic Party legislator James To criticized the Hong Kong government for obstructing the entry of the Goddess of Democracy sculptor Chen Wei-ming, stating, "香港極權起錨，自由拋錨" ("Hong Kong's extreme authority anchors up, freedom anchors away"). The Student Union of the Chinese University of Hong Kong used the slogan "女神起錨" ("Goddess set sail") to transport the Goddess of Democracy into CUHK.

Democratic Party Chairman Albert Ho described the universal suffrage issue as following: "don't know where to go after anchoring; now the boat is circling", to express confusion over the direction of the universal suffrage issue. Hong Kong Commercial Daily called for moderate democrats to support political reform with the headline "Anchor up for Hong Kong democracy!". Protect Diaoyu Islands activists marched to the U.S. Consulate on Garden Road holding banners with "起錨" ("Act Now") expressing their dissatisfaction. After visiting the Ocean Park, Allan Zeman, the Chairman of the Park, shouted "Act now" in support of taking action. On the day of the vote on political reform, citizens and groups supporting the reform shouted "Act Now" at Chater Garden, and Democratic Party Vice Chairman Emily Lau went forward to shake hands with them, receiving the response "起錨" ("set sail").

=== "All Wrong" ===
Some netizens dissatisfied with "Act Now" changed it to "超錯" ("All Wrong") or "收皮" ("Shōu pí" in Cantonese slang, meaning "to be more frugal"). Due to the close resemblance of the font between "All Wrong" and "Act Now", "All Wrong" quickly became a trendy term in Hong Kong.

=== Hong Kong politics ===
Some netizens mockingly referred to the originator of "Act Now" ("set sail"), Donald Tsang, as the "captain of the Titanic". In addition, RTHK director Franklin Wong was criticized by pan-democratic lawmakers for continuously promoting "Act Now" on the radio. Subsequently, Cheng Yiu-tong, the convener of the Alliance for Moving Forward with Constitutional Development and the chairman of the Hong Kong Federation of Trade Unions, organized a large rally on June 19 in Victoria Park to support the political reform proposal, using the theme of "setting sail", aligning with the government's "Act Now" initiative.

Donald Tsang summarized the "Act Now" action as follows: "This time, going to the districts is a new experience and challenge. By taking action, we are pushing democracy one step forward. How can it be wrong?". After "Act Now," a survey by the One Country Two Systems Research Institute showed that the support rate for the political reform proposal had decreased to 54%, a 2% decline from the previous survey. The Secretary-General of the Civic Party, Kenneth Chan Ka-lok, said: "Before the "Act Now" action, when discussing the details of the debate (referring to the debate with Donald Tsang), the other party was willing to consider more. However, in recent days, they have been unwilling to accept it".

Furthermore, Henry Tang, during his attendance at the New Territories Association of Societies, believed that his work theme in 2010, "New Starting Point, New Milestone," resonated with "起錨" (Lift the Anchor). After the second round of "起錨," Donald Tsang's score in the public opinion survey conducted by the University of Hong Kong's Public Opinion Programme was 49.2, showing an increase of 0.2 points compared to the previous survey. At the same time, the Political Reform Dynamic Force of the business and professional sectors supporting political reform announced that it had sent a circular to approximately 2.4 million households and business enterprises across Hong Kong, explaining: "Rejecting the proposal again would be 'All Wrong,' supporting political reform is to 'set sail.'" The Power for Democracy group, supporting political reform, sent letters to around 2.4 million households and business entities across Hong Kong, explaining: "Veto the plan again: All Wrong. Support political reform, Set Sail".

Ming Pao newspaper noted that the "Act Now" action led to social polarization. The University of Hong Kong's Public Opinion Programme reported that after "Act Now", the opposition to the government's proposed 2012 Chief Executive election method increased by 9 percentage points to 43%, while those in favor decreased to 41%.

The promotional video was questioned as political advertising that should be regulated. After the political reform proposal was passed, security chief political assistant Lo Jik-gei, still wearing the "Act Now" lapel pin, was mocked by Tang Yau-kay, the vice chair of the Hong Kong Girl Guides Association. Legislators Andrew Leung, who participated in the movement, received the Gold Bauhinia Star, while Lew Mon-hung, a National Committee of the Chinese People's Political Consultative Conference member, received the Bronze Bauhinia Star. Senior Lecturer Choy Ji-keung from the Department of Politics and Public Administration at the Chinese University of Hong Kong questions whether the Hong Kong government is engaging in "rewarding based on contributions".

The pan-democratic camp planned to lodge a complaint with the Broadcasting Authority against the "Act Now" promotional video, alleging it violated the law. Sing Tao Daily reported that within the government, "Act Now" was considered the "back story" of the political reform proposal. Democratic Party legislator Cheung Man-kwong questioned Donald Tsang's motivation for launching the "Act Now" action, suggesting he was afraid of stepping down.

== See also ==
- 2010 Hong Kong electoral reform
- Politics of Hong Kong
