= 2010 Hong Kong electoral reform =

- Date: 18 November 2009 – 28 August 2010
- Location: Hong Kong
- Participants: Government of Hong Kong, LegCo, Pan-democrats, pro-Beijing camp
- Outcome: 1) 2012 Chief executive election committee members increased from 800 to 1,200 members 2) 10 more seats added to legislature for a total of 70
- Website: www.cmab-cd2012.gov.hk

2010 Hong Kong electoral reform

Consultation Document on the Methods for Selecting the Chief Executive and for Forming the Legislative Council in 2012
- Traditional Chinese: 2012年行政長官及立法會產生辦法諮詢文件
- Simplified Chinese: 2012年行政长官及立法会产生办法谘询文件
Transcriptions
Standard Mandarin
- Hanyu Pinyin: 2012 nian^{2} xing^{2} zheng^{4} chang^{2} guan^{1} ji^{2} li^{4} fa^{3} hui^{4} chan^{3} sheng^{1} ban^{4} fa^{3} zi^{1} xun^{2} wen^{2} jian^{4}
Yue: Cantonese
- Jyutping: 2012 nin^{4} hang^{4} zing^{3} zoeng^{2} gun^{1} kap^{6} lap^{6} faat^{3} wui^{6*2} caan^{2} sang^{1} baan^{6} faat^{3} zi^{1} seon^{1} man^{4} gin^{6*2}

Package of Proposals for the Methods for Selecting the Chief Executive and for Forming the Legislative Council in 2012
- Traditional Chinese: 2012年行政長官及立法會產生辦法建議方案
- Simplified Chinese: 2012年行政长官及立法会产生办法建议方案
Transcriptions
Standard Mandarin
- Hanyu Pinyin: 2012 nian^{2} xing^{2} zheng^{4} chang^{2} guan^{1} ji^{2} li^{4} fa^{3} hui^{4} chan^{3} sheng^{1} ban^{4} fa^{3} jian^{4} yi^{4} fang^{1} an^{4}
Yue: Cantonese
- Jyutping: 2012 nin^{4} hang^{4} zing^{3} zoeng^{2} gun^{1} kap^{6} lap^{6} faat^{3} wui^{6*2} caan^{2} sang^{1} baan^{6} faat^{3} gin^{3} ji^{5} fong^{1} on^{3}

Second alternative Chinese name
- Traditional Chinese: 2012政制方案
- Simplified Chinese: 2012政制方案
Transcriptions
Standard Mandarin
- Hanyu Pinyin: zheng4 zhi4 fang^{1} an^{4}
Yue: Cantonese
- Jyutping: zing^{3} zai^{3} fong^{1} on^{3}

The 2010 Hong Kong electoral reform was the series of events beginning in 2009 and finalised in 2010 under the Consultation Document on the Methods for Selecting the Chief Executive and for Forming the Legislative Council in 2012, a document published on 18 November 2009 by the Government of Hong Kong to broaden the scope of political participation and increase the democratic elements in the 2012 elections in line with the Hong Kong Basic Law.

The proposals included modifying the arrangements for electing the Chief executive of Hong Kong and the composition and ways of electing the city's legislature in 2012, in line with the December 2007 decision of the Standing Committee of the National People's Congress (NPCSC). While the pan-democracy camp attacked the conservative proposals as a rehash of those already rejected in 2005, the government said its proposals were "more democratic", and could not exceed what was authorised by Beijing.

The consultations took place in the backdrop of talks about a de facto referendum, and the 2010 Hong Kong by-election precipitated by the resignation of five pan-democrat legislators in January 2010. Official attempts to secure the passage of the proposals resulted in a media campaign by the city's leaders and an unprecedented televised debate between the Chief Executive and a leader of an opposition party; it also resulted in renewing of dialogue between Beijing and the pro-democracy camp which ceased after the Tiananmen Square protests of 1989.

Following the Chinese Central Government's acceptance at the eleventh hour of a proposal by the Democratic Party concerning the new District Council functional constituency seats which they had up to that point opposed as being in contravention of the Basic Law, the consultation package was accepted by LegCo on 25 June, with 46 votes. The pan-democrat camp was split when the Democratic Party voted with the government amidst severe recriminations and protests of betrayal; the League of Social Democrats and the Civic Party remained opposed to the package but were unable to block its passage. The Chief Executive assented on 29 June 2010, and China's parliament ratified the decision on 28 August 2010.

== Background ==
=== Pan-democrats' blueprint ===
In March 2007, the pan-democrats published their own blueprint, the 'mainstream transitional proposal' drawn up with the support of 21 legislators in accordance with principles of equal and universal suffrage and which they said reflected public opinion. They proposed that 400 elected district councillors would join the existing 800-member Election Committee, making a total of 1,200-members; Nominations threshold would be set at 50 EC members, and the candidate for CE would be elected in a one-person, one-vote election. Ultimately, the nomination committee would be scrapped. For the legislature, they proposed returning half of the Legco's seats by direct election in single-seat constituencies, with the other half determined by proportional representation.

=== Chief executive's report ===
During his campaign in the CE election in 2007, Donald Tsang promised that he would "endeavour to forge consensus within the community within his new term, so that universal suffrage could be implemented as soon as possible". A Green Paper on Constitutional Development was published on 11 July to open discussion on the options, roadmap and timetable for implementing universal suffrage for the CE and the LegCo. According to the consultation document, the CE submitted a report to the NPCSC on 12 December 2007, that "reflect[ed] faithfully the views of different sectors of the community on the issue of universal suffrage received during the public consultation period." The government document asserted that "more than half of the public supported the implementation of universal suffrage for the CE and the LegCo ('dual universal suffrage') in 2012, and at the same time, implementing universal suffrage for the CE first by no later than 2017 would stand a better chance of being accepted by the majority in our community."

=== NPCSC resolution ===
On 29 December 2007, the NPCSC resolved that:

the election of the fifth Chief executive of the Hong Kong Special Administrative Region in the year 2017 may be implemented by the method of universal suffrage; that after the Chief executive is selected by universal suffrage, the election of the Legislative Council of the Hong Kong Special Administrative Region may be implemented by the method of electing all the members by universal suffrage... Appropriate amendments conforming to the principle of gradual and orderly progress may be made to the specific method for selecting the fourth Chief executive of the Hong Kong Special Administrative Region in the year 2012 and the specific method for forming the fifth term Legislative Council of the Hong Kong Special Administrative Region in the year 2012 in accordance with the provisions of Articles 45 and 68, and those of Article 7 of Annex I and Article III of Annex II to the Basic Law

The decision stipulated that:

The only certainty is that Hong Kong will get exactly what Beijing wants it to have, which is exactly zilch.

— Asia Times, 11 January 2008

The bills on the amendments to the method for selecting the Chief executive and the proposed amendments to such bills shall be introduced by the Government of the Hong Kong Special Administrative Region to the Legislative Council; such amendments must be made with the endorsement of a two-thirds majority of all the members of the Legislative Council and the consent of the Chief executive

== The consultation ==
The NPCSC decision became the backbone of the document published by the government on 18 November 2009, entitled the "Consultation Document on the Methods for Selecting the Chief executive and for Forming the LegCo in 2012". The government said proposals broadened the scope of political participation and increase substantially the democratic elements in the 2012 elections. The consultation ended three months later with 47,200 written submissions being received.

=== Variables ===
The government notes that, despite calls from some quarters to discuss universal suffrage models, it has only been authorised by the NPCSC to determine the methods for selecting the CE and for forming the LegCo in 2012; how the two electoral methods should be amended for attaining universal suffrage is outside of its scope. It said that "there is still ample room for making amendments to the electoral method to enhance its democratic elements" in 2012, and proposed the following for LegCo elections:

- To increase the number of LegCo seats to 70 (from 60). The number of seats to be returned by geographical constituencies ("GCs") through direct elections and those returned by functional constituencies ("FCs") to be increased to 35 respectively;
- to have all the five new FC seats and the existing District Council seat returned through election by elected District Council members from among themselves, i.e. appointed District Council members will not take part in the election;
- the six District Council seats should be returned through election from among elected District Council members by proportional representation, so that in the 2012 LegCo, 41 seats (i.e. close to 60% of all seats) will be returned through geographical direct or indirect elections;
- that Hong Kong permanent residents who are not of Chinese nationality or who have the right of abode in foreign countries may stand in the elections for 12 FC seats (no change);
- that only elected District Council members will participate in the election of District Council seats in the Election Committee and the LegCo, thus enhancing the democratic elements of the elections.

For Chief Executive elections, it proposes:

- to increase the number of members of the Election Committee to 1,200;
- to increase the proportion of elected District Council members in the Election Committee;
- to maintain the ratio of one-eighth of the total membership of the Election Committee (i.e. 150 members);
- no upper limit on the number of subscribers should be set at this stage;
- the requirement that the CE should not have any political affiliation should not be changed for the 2012 CE election, but can be reviewed in the longer term.

The Asia Times remarked that both proposals for LegCo and for the Chief executive "hedged in with so many ifs and buts that there is no guarantee of Hong Kong getting anything at all... " The level of interest in, and the knowledge of, the proposals was low: A poll conducted by the University of Hong Kong on 18 November of 1,001 people found 68 per cent knew 'little' of what the consultation was all about; a similar survey three months later remained at 70 per cent. The pollster said the resignation plan by five legislators, without sufficient focus on the details of the reforms, shifted attention away from the plan. Albert Ho said the end game needed to be in sight, because 2012 was only a transition. He dismissed the proposal as "meaningless" because it failed to address the pan-democrats' real concerns. On a three-day trip to Beijing in late December, Donald Tsang was asked by Chinese Communist Party general secretary Hu Jintao to handle Hong Kong's constitutional reforms 'in an appropriate manner'. He was told by Premier Wen Jiabao that Hong Kong 'should start to study major macro-issues relating to holistic developments and plan for the future. It should better resolve some deep-rooted conflicts in Hong Kong, make good uses of Hong Kong's advantages, sharpen Hong Kong's competitiveness and pay more attention to social services and people's livelihood.'

Pan-democrats all agreed that the proposals do not go far enough, but were divided on what action is needed. Significantly, the Democratic Party opted to engage with Beijing to negotiate, parting company with the Civic Party and the LSD. In January 2010, five legislators from the Civic Party and the LSD resigned their seats as part of the 'Five Constituencies Resignation' concept for meaningful political reform; Albert Chan, Alan Leong, Tanya Chan, "Longhair" Leung Kwok-hung and Wong Yuk-man resigned from LegCo. Their resignations were submitted on 26 January 2010, with effect on 29 January 2010. Beijing warned the five legislator not to resign. Chief executive Donald Tsang said the "so-called referendum" had no legal grounding. The resignations precipitated a by-election throughout the territory which took place on 16 May 2010.

== The 2009 package ==
In a surprise move, the government unveiled the revised package before it was scheduled. Key proposals, such as increasing the Election Committee for the chief executive election from 800 members to 1,200 in 2012 and increasing the number of Legislative Council members from 60 to 70, remained unchanged. It was proposed that the five additional Legco seats for the district council constituency would be elected by proportional representation instead of block voting as suggested by pan-democrats. Announcing the plan, Chief Secretary Henry Tang said the government tried to find the "maximum latitude to enhance the democratic elements of the two elections in 2012." He urged legislators to accept this 'golden opportunity' because there was no room for further concessions. The proposals were to be put before Legco on 23 June, before the summer recess.

=== Comparisons with the 2004 package ===
	Existing in 2009	2004 government proposal	2009 government proposal	2007 pan-democrats proposal
Composition of Election Committee (EC)				
Industrial, commercial and financial:	200	300	300	300
Professional:	200	300	300	300
Labour, social services and religious:	200	300	300	300
Legco, district councils, NPC, CPPCC and Heung Yee Kuk:	200	700	300	700
of which District Councillors		all 534		
elected				400
Total Election Committee:	800	1600	1200	2000
nominations threshold:	100	200	150	50
election method	EC	EC	EC	universal
				EC ultimately scrapped
Composition of Legislative Council				
Geographical constituencies:	30	35	35	
Functional constituencies:	30	35	35	
of which 5 new District Council sector seats				
elected by all DC members		5		
elected only by elected DC members			5	
Total LegCo	60	70	70	

== Views on the 2009 package ==
=== Chinese government ===
Qiao Xiaoyang, head of the NPC's Hong Kong Basic Law Committee, said the reason the Standing Committee ruled that Hong Kong "may" and not "must" have universal suffrage for the 2017 chief executive and 2020 Legislative Council elections was because any change in electoral methods required approval by local lawmakers. He added that passage of the reform package would "create excellent conditions for universal suffrage in the future".

At a seminar organised by a coalition of Beijing-friendly groups, deputy director of the central government's liaison office, Li Gang said that lawmakers should act bravely and responsibly to reach consensus, and create favourable conditions for realising the universal suffrage timetable. Li said: "It is impossible for a winner to take all on the issue of constitutional development. There can only be win-win. If one wants to win alone, the result may be lose-lose."

After the government unveiled the procedures for the LegCo vote, deputy secretary general of the National People's Congress Standing Committee, Qiao Xiaoyang, defined 'universal suffrage' as:

- conferring an equal and universal right to vote
- taking into consideration Hong Kong's legal status
- being compatible with the executive-led political system
- balancing the interests of different sectors of society
- being beneficial for the development of the city's capitalist economy

The pan-democrats said Qiao's statement reinforced their concerns, as it offered only the right to vote rather than to stand and nominate others in an election, and further paved the way for keeping functional constituencies indefinitely.

=== Hong Kong government ===
Constitutional Affairs minister Stephen Lam insisted that the reform proposal was more democratic than the 2005 package which was voted down by the Legislative Council, and was more likely to advance the city's political system if approved. He said that the timetable of universal suffrage in 2017 and 2020 was not ideal, but asserted that it was "a practical one that is accepted by over 60 percent of residents."

Chief Secretary Henry Tang said the government would consider scrapping appointed district councillors if sufficient opposition lawmakers promise to support the 2012 political reform package. Speaking at a seminar, Tang warned pan-democrats that being "led by the nose by a small group of loud people, one will only step onto a road of no return paved with thorns". He said that there was time to have an in-depth discussion on whether functional constituencies should exist, and how legislators should be elected under universal suffrage, but said: "It is undemocratic, unscientific and impractical to simplify the matter as `scrapping functional constituencies' and peg it with the 2012 political reform package."

=== Pan-democrats ===
Pan-democrats expressed their deep disappointment with the proposals; their 18 legislators intimated their preparedness to vote down the package if no further progress is made on democracy.

The Democratic Party condemned the consultation document for failing to bring in dual universal suffrage (for LegCo and for the chief executive elections) by 2012, and again demanded the functional constituencies, which were untouched by the proposal, to be abolished for good. The "One person, two votes" concept was also brought up. However, the Democratic Party stopped short of refusing the proposal outright, and expressed the view that if there is no universal suffrage in 2012, the proposal must state that there will be 'real' universal suffrage in 2017 and 2020.

The Democratic Party opting for engagement with Beijing, having assessed was that Beijing was keen to see a breakthrough in the reform talks because it realised that chief executive Donald Tsang's administration would become a lame-duck administration if his reform package was again defeated. Believed that Beijing wanted reform in Hong Kong to offset international pressure over the lack of human rights, and to set an example for Taiwan, they abandoned the 'radicals' to their referendum plan. The Alliance for Universal Suffrage – an umbrella group of moderates with Democratic Party at its core which counts 15 legislators as its members – entered into discussions with representatives of Beijing. They asked for guarantees of the abolition of functional constituencies before they would accept an increase in the government's proposal. In May, Pan-democrat groups reported having been in contact with mainland officials for several months to discuss ideas for reform; they quote officials as saying that a statement on electoral reform beyond 2012 will be made, conditional upon LegCo's approval of the current package. However, one member of the Alliance said "Pan-democrats would be reluctant to take the political risk to back the proposal for the 2012 elections before Beijing makes a statement on the electoral arrangements beyond 2016."

Civic Party lawmaker Audrey Eu said her party will not support the "regressive and unacceptable" reform package, that increases the number of functional constituency seats. She said the current proposals, still lacking a roadmap and is thus confined to discussing change for 2012, and not beyond, are no improvement on those vetoed five years ago. She criticised the government for dodging important questions such as how universal suffrage reconciled with functional constituencies; how reform will not be blocked in Legco by functional constituency legislators, who make up half the chamber; and how the political system should evolve to improve governance and mitigate the increasing societal conflict and widening wealth gap.

LSD chairman Andrew To understood that Donald Tsang does not have the power to initiate democratic reform. He said the package was 'old wine in a new bottle', written to give the illusion of reform, while allowing Hong Kong's vested interests to maintain their political power. He lamented the relegation of real reform off into the vague future. To warned Tsang and the pro-Beijing camp not to twist the definition of universal suffrage against the people's interests, and rejected the pro-Beijing camp's assertions that functional constituencies were compatible with the concept of full universal suffrage.

Anson Chan dismissed the latest package as "retrograde": increasing functional constituencies further entrenched narrow vested interests. She called on the government give a clear commitment to abolishing functional constituencies by 2020 at the latest; to make the composition of Election Committee for the chief executive more representative and its workings more transparent; to broaden the electoral base by rebalancing constituencies.

Cardinal Joseph Zen expressed his outrage, anger and helplessness at being "treat[ed] like idiots" by the government. He denounced the faux-consultation on a package which was little different from the undemocratic proposal voted down in 2005, in that it lacked direction, and road map for universal suffrage. "Even if we reject it, it will not affect the introduction of universal suffrage in 2017 and 2020," he said.

=== Government-friendly groups ===
DAB chairman, Tam Yiu-chung, said that while the proposals could be improved upon, his party supported enlarging the Election Committee to 1,200, and creating five district council functional constituency seats in 2012. He proposed to then open up the six district council functional constituency seats for all members of the public, not just district councillors, to contest. In late April, LegCo president Jasper Tsang increased pressure on pan-democrats, whilst triggering controversy when he indicated his willingness to resign his post to vote for reform proposals. He said "Government officials probably also agree my vote is more important than my being Legco president. My post can be temporarily taken by someone else."

Whilst believing the reform package represents a step forward in democratisation, the Liberal Party expressed disappointment that the package did not address the need to expand the electorate base of functional constituencies. James Tien said that in failing to offer concrete proposals on functional constituencies, the government was "not scratching where it itches". He suggested that under a model where functional constituencies would be retained, voters should be able choose a functional constituency in which to cast a second vote. He said that people would enjoy equal voting rights compatible with the principle of universal suffrage; expert views and sectoral interests would still be represented in a legislature otherwise dominated by career politicians.

Independent legislator and former security minister Regina Ip criticised the precipitation of the by-election. She urged the public to refocus on the two methods for selecting the chief executive and electing the legislature in 2012, to forge a consensus on how to move forward in 2012, and lay the foundation for universal suffrage in 2017 and 2020.

=== The legal profession ===
The Law Society and Bar Association reiterated their call for the abolition of functional constituencies as being non-compliant with international law – Article 25(b) of the International Covenant on Civil and Political Rights and Article 21 of the Bill of Rights. They urged the government to put forward a revised consultation document with more progressive proposals, a clear road map on the way forward, and a commitment to abolish functional constituencies.

Law Society observed that structure of the proposals places a very heavy burden on the chief executive in the three years 2017 to 2020 when major changes were required, and expressed concern that it may thus breach the requirement of the principle of 'gradual and orderly progress' enshrined in Articles 45 and 68 of the Basic Law. The Bar Association said that corporate or directors' voting was also incompatible with international law; they said the failure to comply is not mitigated by replacing corporate voting by an authorised representative with voting by directors, executives, member associations, individual members.

=== Business groups ===
The Hong Kong General Chamber of Commerce supported maintaining functional constituencies, to provide Legco with the necessary expertise in scrutinising bills and policies. But was open to discuss ways to broaden their voter base, such as 'one-person, two-votes'. They hope to see alignment of chief executive with a political party to facilitate governance, and the CE able to appoint legislators from like-minded groups as principal officials to further cement the link between the administration and the legislature. In a survey conducted by TNS, more than 60 percent of business and opinion leaders in Hong Kong want Beijing to promise to take steps in 2016 to pave the way for universal suffrage and abolish functional constituencies; 43% of those surveyed believed the central government should make more concessions to ensure the passage of the package, while one-quarter say the pan-democratic camp should offer concessions. However, on the possible veto, 43% of the respondents would favour a veto if there was no roadmap for universal suffrage, compared with 39 per cent who disagreed. A pro-Beijing legislator for Kowloon East said the majority of Hong Kong people considered the proposal inadequate and hoped Beijing would make more concessions.

=== Pundits ===
Joseph Wong, former secretary for civil service, suggested the government could go further in broadening the democratic base of electorates for the Election Committee by adding new seats in three sub-sectors, to be returned by individual voting; the nomination threshold for the 2012 chief executive election should be lowered from one-eighth to one-tenth, or 160 nominations. He suggest that Legco should remain at 60, but five trade-based seats – education, legal, medical, health services and social welfare – should be returned by 'one man, one vote'.

Simon Young, director of the Centre of Comparative and Public Law at the University of Hong Kong, said they hoped for a gradual rearrangement of functional constituencies sectors to achieve greater balance, and to diminish the influence of the most problematic functional constituencies – the commercial, industrial and financial sectors, which operate by corporate or directors' votes, and then abolishing them by 2020.

=== Civic groups ===
Former legislator, Christine Loh of Civic Exchange acknowledged the HK government had little room for manoeuvre. She said it was widely held that Hong Kong elections were unfair. Functional constituencies and sub-sector elections for the legislature and chief executive selection respectively needed urgent change to remove corporate voting because vested business interests enjoy an excessively dominant role in politics – the alignment of commercial interests with political interests creating a deadly combination. She said it was regrettable that Tsang and his team of officials could not be seen to stand and fight side by side with Hong Kong people, but were instead little more than Beijing's messengers.

Teachers' group Education Convergence said there needed to be a road map for universal suffrage for the chief executive and LegCo elections in 2017 and 2020. The one-eighth nomination threshold for chief executive candidates must be lowered to 50 votes. The government must promise that all functional constituencies will be abolished in 2020.

=== Public view ===
In a Hong Kong University poll in May, 48% respondents said legislators should accept the proposals, while the government cited a One Country Two Systems Research Institute survey of 856 people, which suggested 60 per cent supported the proposals.

== Pan-democrats' negotiations with Beijing ==
Li Gang (2nd right), deputy director of the Liaison Office of the Central People's Government in Hong Kong, meets for the first time with Democratic Party leaders: Vice-Chairman Emily Lau (left), Chairman Albert Ho (2nd left), and Cheung Man-kwong (3rd left) to discuss constitutional reform

Following the by-election, it was revealed that meetings had been arranged for "moderate" pan-democrats to meet Beijing representatives – the first meeting between Democratic Party leaders and senior officials from the central government since the Tiananmen Square protests of 1989 – for talks on democratic development. To that end, Li Gang, the deputy director of the central government's liaison office in Hong Kong, met with Democratic Party leaders Emily Lau, Cheung Man-kwong and Albert Ho for talks on 24 May; he met the Alliance for Universal suffrage representatives on 26 May, and members of the Association for Democracy and People's Livelihood (ADPL) on 28 May. The Democrats demanded that district council functional constituency lawmakers, instead of being chosen in 2012 by Councillors, that they be nominated by Councillors but elected through universal suffrage. They also argued for scrapping functional constituencies in 2020 and keeping the nomination threshold of 2017 chief executive election at 100 votes. Li Gang rejected these demands, on the grounds that enlarging the voter base in such a way would "not be in line with the original intent of the Basic Law", he asked them to soften their stance "for the good of all".

An insider to the negotiations with Beijing revealed that mainland officials said that the Democratic Party must be prepared to drop the 4 June issue if it wanted to maintain a long-term dialogue. As a result of the hostility from fellow pan-democrats at the Democratic Party 'betrayal' vote, the Democratic Party agreed to deliver a report disclosing full details of their negotiations with Beijing.

== Official publicity campaign ==
Following the by-election, the government stepped up efforts to gain support for the reform package. It commissioned two television advertisements which emphasised the need to move forwards with democratisation. Tsang began to campaign via radio interviews, and he and his ministers took to the streets to mobilise support. The roadshow culminated with a televised debate with Audrey Eu of the Civic Party.

On 17 May, one day after the by-election, Donald Tsang gave an interview to Metro Radio in the final push to gain support for the constitutional reform proposals. When asked whether he would consider agreeing to a televised debate, he only smiled. On 21 May, reports came that Audrey Eu had accepted Tsang's invitation to a one-hour televised debate on the reform package on 17 June, one week before the LegCo vote. The move puzzled some observers. Ma Ngok, a Chinese University academic, said there was a risk it could be seen as recognition of the claimed mandate following the referendum call. Politician Regina Ip criticised the decision as unnecessarily giving political platform to the leader of a movement which the government has worked hard to condemn (i.e. Audrey Eu and the pan-democrats). The Democratic Party and the League of Social Democrats complained that their parties were being excluded from the debate. Although the public was to be excluded, ostensibly for public order reasons, Tsang provoked controversy by saying, "The seven million people in Hong Kong can all participate." The Democratic Party's Albert Ho called Tsang's definition of "participation" as "a joke". The South China Morning Post welcomed Tsang's decision to debate with Eu on television; Ip said that Tsang's heroism was laudable, but that he had more to lose; political commentator Frank Ching said that the stakes were high for Tsang: a repeat of the 2005 veto would cast him as someone who cannot get things done for Beijing. Hong Kong University academic Albert Cheng said that the public was, quite rightly, favourably disposed towards the debate as the way of breaking the stalemate and moving forwards; he condemned all those politicians who were self-promoting, and 'grandstanding' of their own agendas to the detriment of Hong Kong.

Two publicly funded television commercials entitled "Move forward. Don't stand still" and "Trust makes our dream come true" urged support for the reform package but were greeted with controversy; a third publicly funded television spot featuring three ExCo members was launched in late May. A citywide poster campaign was also planned. According to Regina Ip, full-page newspaper advertisements by the government were "unimpressive".

=== Act Now ===
Animated gif of parody logo ('All Wrong' & 'Collect Skin' superimposed on official logo 'Act Now')

Shortly after the campaign slogan and logo was made public, a parody was created that turned the original Chinese slogan 'Act Now' (起錨 in Chinese, meaning 'up-anchor') into ideograms for 'All Wrong' (超錯 in Chinese) & 'Collect Skin' (收皮 is a crude term in Chinese). In his personal blog, Tsang attacked his opponents, saying that those opposing the reform measures were the ones who were getting it all wrong. On the weekend of 29/30 May, Tsang and his ministers toured Hong Kong on an unpublicised itinerary to deliver flyers and meet the public. Tsang described as "myths" which surrounded the proposals – that it is regressive, it makes little difference whether it is passed or not, and that ordinary people are not concerned by political developments. He said they were "the first step as well as the last opportunity" to lay the foundation for a chief executive elected by universal suffrage in 2017. He expressed his fear that "a mood of pessimism and cynicism will take root" if there was no progress this time. Ministers visited schools to inform and discuss the proposals with staff and students; some were mobbed when leaving the schools' premises.

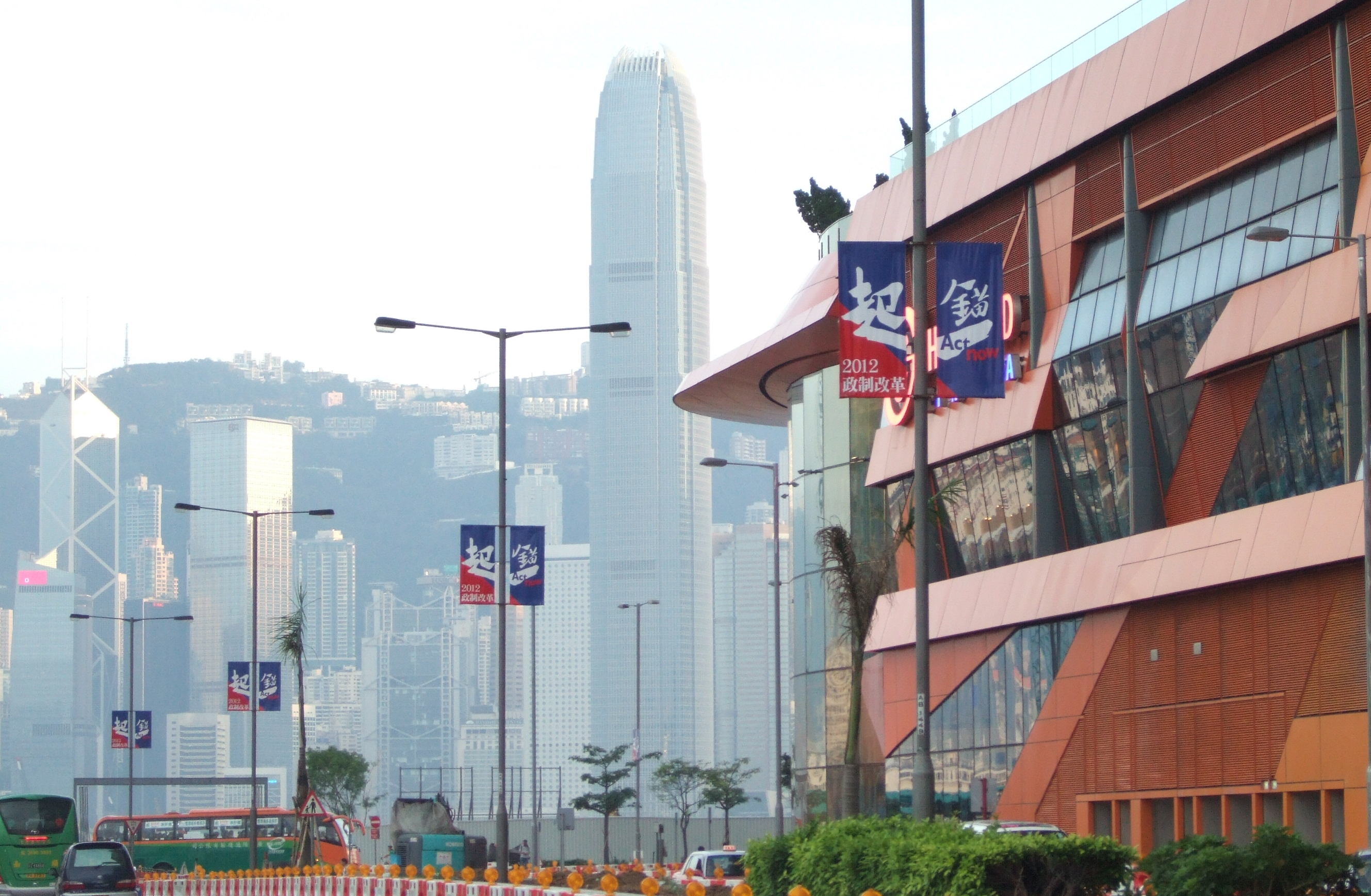
Street shot showing 'Act Now' banners in support of the Government's electoral reform campaign

Ministers continued their campaign roadshow on the weekend of 5/6 June: they split into three teams to cover the territory. Henry Tang led a team into shopping malls in Kowloon; Donald Tsang made stops at destinations on Hong Kong Island, while John Tsang led colleagues to the New Territories in an attempt to distribute leaflets and badges to the public. Despite the government disclosing ministers' itineraries at short notice, the roadshow was greeted the destinations by students, activists and pan-democratic supporters who had gathered to show their opposition and to demand abolition of functional constituencies. Addressing the crowds, Tsang accused the protesters as being 'the minority'. He used the sailing analogy adopted for the campaign, telling protesters to "stop obstructing this vessel from moving forward". The government disclosed that it had spent HK$9 million excluding airtime as at 9 June.

== Pro-government rally ==
On the day, organisers estimated 120,000 participated in the pro-government rally; Police estimated 70,000, and said 43,000 of them subsequent marched on to Central. Attendees at the rally included Donald Tsang, Liberal Party leader, Miriam Lau, DAB chairman Tam Yiu-chung and Executive Council convenor Leung Chun-ying. The organisation phase or the rally was marred by controversies– there were accusations that organisers were buying support, and certain schools were caught up in exerting undue pressure:

=== Junket controversy ===
Pro-government groups planning a rally on 19 June were attempting to attract participants to their rally in support of the reform proposals by offering free or low-priced junkets. The Hong Kong Quanzhou Association offered registered participants a HK$200 "meal allowance"; Patrick Lau, a government-appointed member of Eastern district council, Wong Wang-tai and Stephen Ng of Wan Chai district council advertised a "promotional tour" through New Century Society and the Happy Valley Residents' Association for HK$30 (US$3.80). A promotional leaflet reads: "Have fun on a tour to Lei Yu Mun, and support the political system to move forward". The organisers denied it was of a political nature, saying it was "only a cheap tour", so it was not inappropriate to ask for a quid pro quo. The Beijing-friendly Federation of Trade Unions counter-accused the CTU of offering participants of a Labour Day march an eight-course seafood meal and transportation for HK$40. The FTU, which expects 20,000 to join the rally, said it had been "negligent" in failing to issue a guideline to affiliated organisations, but reiterated the alliance would not accept handing out cash to participants.

=== School controversy ===
Schools were also the subject of controversy when it was revealed that the MFBM Chan Lui Chung Tak Memorial College in Tin Shui Wai tried to force its students to attend the rally by making it part of the curriculum for which academic credit would be awarded. After the school's notice had circulated widely on the Internet, and outcry among parents, the school's principal made participation voluntary. Teaching staff at the Federation of Education Workers Wong Cho Bau Secondary School in Tung Chung complained to the media that the principal declared participation in the march "an [compulsory] extra-professional development activity" aimed to provide teachers with an opportunity to gain a better understanding of the political situation. The school later denied compulsion, saying it merely informed teachers about the march during a regular conference and never asked them to make public their stance on political development.

== Televised debate ==
podium shot of Donald Tsang (left) ready to engage Audrey Eu (right) in debate on 17 June 2010

The one-hour televised debate between Audrey Eu and Donald Tsang duly took place at 18:35 on 17 June at the Central Government Offices with only a TV audience as planned. A three-member panel – headed by the debate moderator Ng Ming-lam – sifted through the 2,876 questions received, and drew lots to select questions for the debate. Terrestrial broadcasters TVB and ATV said the debate's audience rating averaged out at 1.21 million viewers. Pundits were unanimous that Eu had trounced Tsang in the debate; an overwhelming majority (some 70%) of respondents polled by the HKU and Lingnan University said Eu had won, and some 15% declared in favour of Tsang. Eu's performance was described as polished and engaging, while Tsang was universally panned as being unconvincing and reliant on a prepared script. Although Tsang argued that the real winners were the Hong Kong people, who gained a better understanding of his proposals, The Standard declared that it was a public relations disaster for the government. The University of Hong Kong poll showed that 45% of people were "more opposed" to the government's proposals after the debate, while 20% said they were more supportive. Making light of his defeat, he referred to some pundits' saying that the debate was a bit like the World Cup match between Argentina and South Korea: "My wife told me, like Argentina ... managed to get past the halfway mark so many times, I didn't even get through once."

== Legislative vote ==
The Hong Kong government announced on 7 June that their proposals, basically unchanged since they were unveiled, would be submitted to LegCo in two motions on 23 June: 1) the Amendment to method for forming HK's LegCo, and 2) Amendment to method of selecting the chief executive.

Chief Secretary Henry Tang said: "The package was put forth after careful deliberations. It was formulated after extensive consultation and discussions among members of the public, different sectors of the community and Legco." He reiterated that there was little room, if any, for more changes since the government had already "pushed to the limit" its authority to reform the political structure arising from a 2007 decision by the Standing Committee of the National People's Congress. Pan-democrats, who said any proposals which gave no indication of how universal suffrage would eventually be implemented in 2017 and 2020 were unacceptable, further said the division of new seats in the Election Committee would effectively give more political power to unelected, pro-Beijing figures; all 23 pan-democrat lawmakers signed a declaration pledging to veto the government proposal unless clauses are added to indicate a commitment to abolish functional constituencies.

One week before the LegCo vote, while the government was continuing with its 'Act Now' campaign – described by Albert Ho as "a hard sell" – activists were mobilising a protest in front of LegCo on the day of the vote. Police leave has been cancelled between 22 and 24 June, ready to deploy in anticipation of mass demonstrations on the scale of the Opposition to the Guangzhou-Hong Kong Express Rail Link in November 2009.

=== Breakthrough ===
One week after Democrats' demands were rejected by NPCSC deputy secretary-general Qiao Xiaoyang, and on the same day that Hao Tiechuan of the Central Government Liaison Office also rejected them as unnecessary and "gilding the lily", Henry Tang and Stephen Lam attempted to woo the 'moderate' Democratic Party by holding last-minute talks with its leaders. Tang reportedly agreed to make the request to Beijing when Albert Ho said he would urge his party to support the reform proposal in exchange for the general public being allowed to elect legislators from the new five-seat district council functional constituency following their nomination by district council members. After the 'moderates' indicated their 'bottom line', the request was submitted to Beijing government, which indicated its willingness to accept the Democratic Party counter-proposals for five new district council functional constituency seats in the Legislative Council to be returned by popular election. However, there was dissent within the Democratic Party, notably from Martin Lee; other leading pan-democrats, such as Audrey Eu, also did not believe the package went far enough towards meeting democratic aspirations of Hong Kong people under the Basic Law.

Over the weekend of 19 June, the official stance softened considerably: senior officials were quoted in the press saying that proposals which once supposedly violated the Basic Law or the NPCSC decision were now viewed as acceptable. The South China Morning Post revealed that Donald Tsang had written a letter the previous week to Xi Jinping, Politburo Standing Committee member and vice-president in charge of Hong Kong affairs, requesting Beijing's endorsement. One SCMP source was quoted as saying, "The chief executive warned in the letter that Hong Kong could face a serious governance crisis if the electoral reform package was vetoed by Legco again, and his ability to govern Hong Kong effectively would be in doubt". The source said Communist Party leader Hu Jintao personally approved the proposals, as the leadership feared further strengthening of the "radical" pan-democrats.

At their meeting on 21 June, the Democratic Party membership voted by a two-thirds majority in support of their leadership's proposal. However, the breakthrough was not without cost. Within the party, Martin Lee dissented, and said he was contemplating resigning from the party he helped to found, lamenting, "It's not the party I knew". Legislators Andrew Cheng and James To said they were still undecided on their LegCo votes, as their loyalty to the party was in conflict with their responsibility to their constituents. The rift with other pan-democrats widened as the revised proposals were still considered inadequate. The Civic Party's membership endorsed their leadership position against the revised plan. There was a very hostile reaction from the League of Social Democrats. 38 civic groups accused the Democratic Party of reneging on its commitment, selling out Hong Kong people and failing to uphold its principles.

The SCMP endorsed the proposal, but said it would have been better had the proposal "been part of a carefully thought out road map to universal suffrage in 2017 and 2020". On 21 June, US Ambassador to China Jon Huntsman, Jr. declared of the revised proposal, "This seems to be yet another positive step en route to what the people of Hong Kong deserve".

=== Adjournment vote ===
In introducing a motion to delay the vote for two weeks, proposer Cyd Ho (Civic Act-up) said: "What you are doing is requesting the pan-democratic camp to write you a blank cheque ... or do the equivalent of telling you the PIN of our ATM card". Constitutional Affairs minister, Stephen Lam, replied: "We should not mark time by delaying the debate on the resolutions. We should stride ahead and move towards universal suffrage." Accountancy FC legislator Paul Chan (Independent) supported the delay, saying the proposals would then win widespread support through better public knowledge. Audrey Eu said that voting just hours after rough proposal was "extremely disrespectful to the people, disrespectful to this council, and there are a number of issues left blank which should be resolved"; Albert Chan said the new proposal lacked consultation, and criticised the government of using political power to hijack public opinion. Lau Kong-wah of the DAB dismissed those who supported the adjournment as people who just "oppose everything". Margaret Ng (Civic Party) expressed concern that the government's drafting of vague and open resolutions would give them the opportunity to make last-minute changes without notifying Legco. The adjournment motion failed, after a 5-hour debate; it was supported by directly elected legislators, who voted 18:10 in favour of adjournment, but functional constituency legislators voted 24:6 against. Ip Kwok-him (DAB) later criticised pan-democrats for filibustering with Ho's motion.

=== Legco speeches ===
Founding member of the Democratic Party, Andrew Cheng, who had publicly pondered his moral dilemma in supporting the vote, announced in his Legco speech that he would quit the party because "small, but critical differences of opinion" prevented him from fulfilling his election pledge to strive for universal suffrage in 2012. He however urged other pan-democrats not to doubt the party's sincerity, to stop these personal attacks and continue to pave the way to democracy. Unionist lawmaker Lee Cheuk-yan, who declared his intention to vote against the revised proposals, also urged fellow pan-democrats not to forget human relationships: "How has Hong Kong come to this, where we are scolding our own friends? ... Why do people feel the Democratic Party is no longer one of us? I absolutely do not feel like this ... I absolutely cannot utter the words that they have 'betrayed the people'."

This did not stop Albert Chan from accusing the Democrats of putting party interests above those of the people, and of distortion and misleading them: "To strive for universal suffrage in 2012, that was your election pledge ... If you vote in contradiction to your election pledge, then you have betrayed the people." A subdued Emily Lau conceded she was effectively reneging on her election pledge, saying: "I want to apologise to all those who voted for me ... I accept the condemnation of the people." James To, who had been 'undecided', supported the proposal. Expressing his grave misgivings, he said he feared the creation of "super-functional constituencies" with an even larger mandate than geographical constituency lawmakers, would make them impossible to abolish. To reserved a lament for the change he remarked in Emily Lau, who once had the reputation of a firebrand: "I thought she would bring a firmer and harder stance on principles and influence the Democratic Party. But instead, it has been the party that has changed her."

=== Amendment to method for selecting the Chief executive ===
After a nine-hour debate, the resolution which increases the size of the Election Committee which elects the chief executive in 2012 from 800 to 1,200 members, won endorsement at 2.20 pm on 24 June by the legislature by 46 votes to 13. Pan-democrats who supported the proposals included eight from the Democratic Party, Joseph Lee Kok-long and Frederick Fung of the ADPL. James To, who had earlier expressed misgivings about giving his support, voted in favour.

=== Amendment to method for forming the Hong Kong Legislative Council ===
The loyalist DAB, which had enthusiastically endorsed the original government proposals from the outset, was annoyed at having its credibility weakened by the last minute proposal. The 'Amendment to method for forming the Hong Kong Legislative Council' was approved by LegCo at 13:30 on 25 June, with 46 votes in favour and 12 against. 'Longhair' Leung Kwok-hung was ejected from the chamber just prior to the vote. This adds ten more seats to the legislature, for a total of 70.

=== Voting results ===
GC/FC	Constituency	Member	Party	Vote on CE	Vote on LegCo
GC	Hong Kong Island	Tsang Yok-sing	DAB	Present	Present
GC	New Territories West	Albert Ho	Democratic	✓ Yes	✓ Yes
FC	Engineering	Raymond Ho	Professional Forum	✓ Yes	✓ Yes
GC	New Territories West	Lee Cheuk-yan	CTU	✗ No	✗ No
FC	Finance	David Li	Independent	✓ Yes	✓ Yes
GC	Kowloon East	Fred Li	Democratic	✓ Yes	✓ Yes
FC	Legal	Margaret Ng	Civic	✗ No	✗ No
GC	Kowloon West	James To	Democratic	✓ Yes	✓ Yes
FC	Education	Cheung Man-kwong	Democratic	✓ Yes	✓ Yes
GC	Kowloon East	Chan Kam-lam	DAB	✓ Yes	✓ Yes
FC	Textiles and Garment	Sophie Leung	Economic Synergy	✓ Yes	✓ Yes
GC	New Territories West	Leung Yiu-chung	NWSC	✗ No	✗ No
FC	Commercial (Second)	Philip Wong	Independent	✓ Yes	✓ Yes
FC	Agriculture and Fisheries	Wong Yung-kan	DAB	✓ Yes	✓ Yes
GC	New Territories East	Lau Kong-wah	DAB	✓ Yes	✓ Yes
FC	Heung Yee Kuk	Lau Wong-fat	Economic Synergy	✓ Yes	✓ Yes
FC	Transport	Miriam Lau	Liberal	✓ Yes	✓ Yes
GC	New Territories East	Emily Lau	Democratic	✓ Yes	✓ Yes
GC	New Territories East	Andrew Cheng	Independent	✗ No	✗ No
FC	Sports, Performing Arts, Culture and Publication	Timothy Fok	Independent	✓ Yes	✓ Yes
GC	New Territories West	Tam Yiu-chung	DAB	✓ Yes	✓ Yes
FC	Real Estate and Construction	Abraham Shek	Professional Forum	✓ Yes	✓ Yes
FC	Labour	Li Fung-ying	FLU	✓ Yes	✓ Yes
FC	Catering	Tommy Cheung	Liberal	✓ Yes	✓ Yes
GC	Kowloon West	Frederick Fung	ADPL	✓ Yes	✓ Yes
GC	Hong Kong Island	Audrey Eu	Civic	✗ No	✗ No
FC	Wholesale and Retail	Vincent Fang	Liberal	✓ Yes	✓ Yes
GC	New Territories West	Wong Kwok-hing	FTU	✓ Yes	✓ Yes
GC	New Territories West	Lee Wing-tat	Democratic	✓ Yes	✓ Yes
FC	Health Services	Joseph Lee	Independent	✓ Yes	✓ Yes
FC	Commercial (First)	Jeffrey Lam	Economic Synergy	✓ Yes	✓ Yes
FC	Industrial (First)	Andrew Leung	Economic Synergy	✓ Yes	✓ Yes
GC	New Territories West	Cheung Hok-ming	DAB	✓ Yes	✓ Yes
FC	Import and Export	Wong Ting-kwong	DAB	✓ Yes	✓ Yes
GC	New Territories East	Ronny Tong	Civic	✗ No	✗ No
FC	Financial Services	Chim Pui-chung	Independent	✓ Yes	✓ Yes
FC	Architectural, Surveying and Planning	Patrick Lau	Professional Forum	✓ Yes	✓ Yes
GC	Hong Kong Island	Kam Nai-wai	Democratic	✓ Yes	✓ Yes
GC	Hong Kong Island	Cyd Ho	Civic Act-up	✗ No	✗ No
GC	Kowloon West	Starry Lee	DAB	✓ Yes	✓ Yes
FC	Industrial (Second)	Lam Tai-fai	Independent	✓ Yes	✓ Yes
GC	New Territories East	Chan Hak-kan	DAB	✓ Yes	✓ Yes
FC	Accountancy	Paul Chan	Independent	✓ Yes	✓ Yes
FC	Insurance	Chan Kin-por	Independent	✓ Yes	✓ Yes
GC	Kowloon West	Priscilla Leung	Professional Forum	✓ Yes	✓ Yes
FC	Medical	Leung Ka-lau	Independent	✓ Yes	✓ Yes
FC	Social Welfare	Cheung Kwok-che	SWGU	✗ No	✗ No
GC	New Territories East	Wong Sing-chi	Democratic	✓ Yes	✓ Yes
GC	Kowloon East	Wong Kwok-kin	FTU	✓ Yes	✓ Yes
FC	Labour	Ip Wai-ming	FTU	✓ Yes	✓ Yes
FC	District Council	Ip Kwok-him	DAB	✓ Yes	✓ Yes
GC	Hong Kong Island	Regina Ip	Independent	✓ Yes	✓ Yes
FC	Labour	Pan Pey-chyou	FTU	✓ Yes	✓ Yes
FC	Tourism	Paul Tse	Independent	✓ Yes	✓ Yes
FC	Information Technology	Samson Tam	Independent	✓ Yes	✓ Yes
GC	Kowloon East	Alan Leong	Civic	✗ No	✗ No
GC	New Territories East	Leung Kwok-hung	LSD	✗ No	Absent
GC	Hong Kong Island	Tanya Chan	Civic	✗ No	✗ No
GC	New Territories West	Albert Chan	LSD	✗ No	✗ No
GC	Kowloon West	Wong Yuk-man	LSD	✗ No	✗ No

=== Assent ===
Formal assent to the draft amendments to Annexes I and II to the Basic Law concerning the methods of selecting the Chief executive and forming the Legislative Council was given by the Chief Executive on 29 June 2010. The National People's Congress Standing Committee in Beijing rubber-stamped the two amendments to the Basic Law at its session held on 28 August 2010, paving the way for local legislation on the specific electoral arrangements to be enacted.

== Aftermath ==
Beijing has been credited for successfully splitting the pan-democracy camp. The new reform package has been said to be only a little more democratic than ones rejected in 2005, while following the lines of moderate democrats and rejecting radical ones. Sources have warned that Taiwan should watch out for the "divide and rule" strategy China used in Hong Kong. Some anti-communist graffiti was daubed on the Legislative Council building following the contentious Legco vote in June.

== See also ==
- Democratic development in Hong Kong
- Politics of Hong Kong
- Act Now (slogan)
- Politics of Macau
- 2012 Dual Universal Suffrage (Hong Kong)
