= Jimmy Ng =

Hong Kong politician (born 1969)

The Honourable Jimmy Ng BBS JP
- 吳永嘉
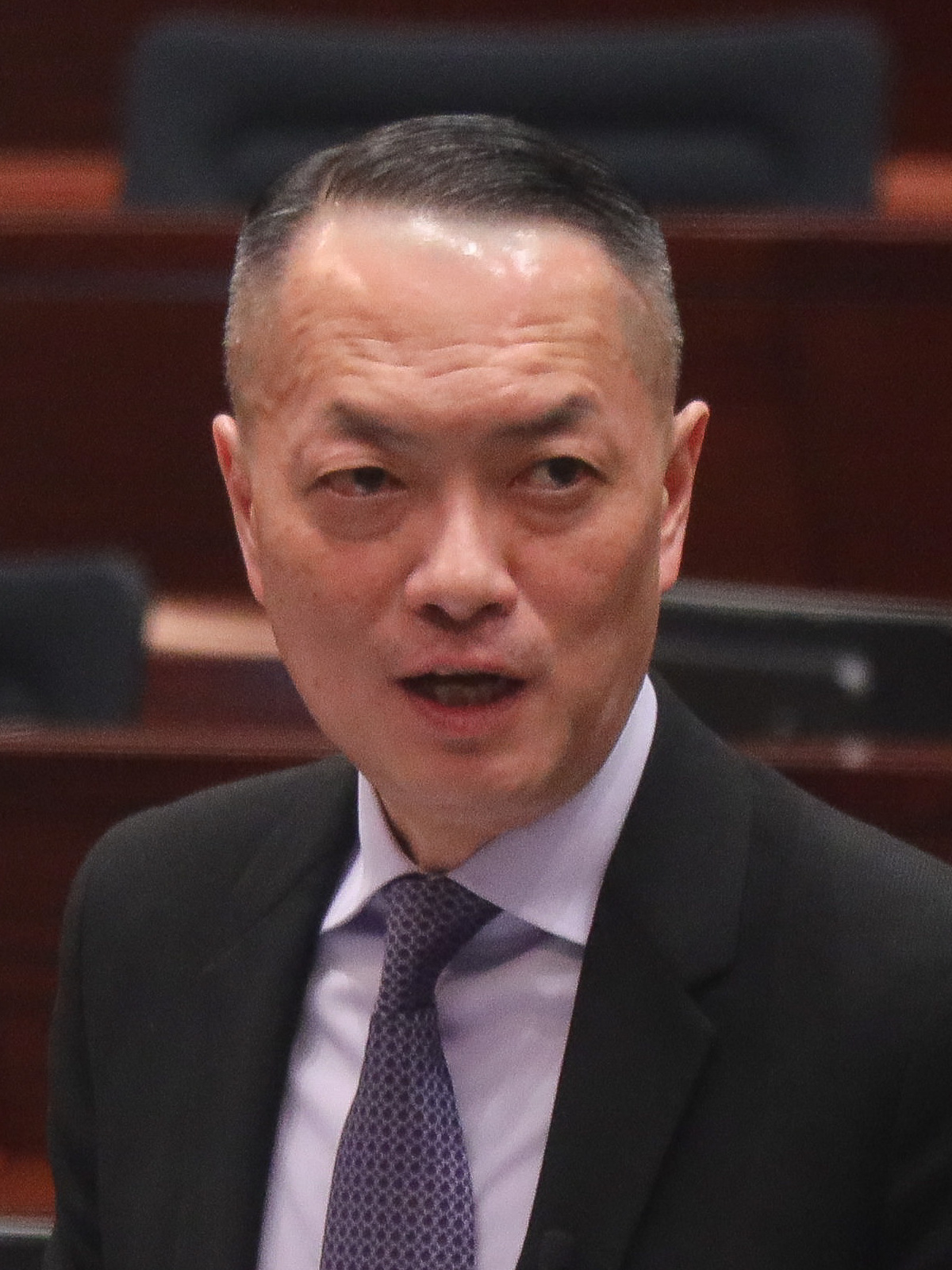
- Ng in 2023

Leader of Business and Professionals Alliance
- Incumbent
- Assumed office 22 December 2025
- Chairperson: Lo Wai-kwok
- Preceded by: New post

Member of the Legislative Council
- Incumbent
- Assumed office 1 October 2016
- Preceded by: Lam Tai-fai
- Constituency: Industrial (Second)

Personal details
- Born: 17 June 1969 (age 57) Hong Kong
- Party: Business and Professionals Alliance for Hong Kong
- Education: University of Hong Kong
- Occupation: Businessman
- Profession: Solicitor

Jimmy Ng Wing-ka, BBS, JP (Chinese: 吳永嘉; born 17 June 1969) is a solicitor, businessman and politician in Hong Kong. He is the Legislative Council Representative of the Chinese Manufacturers' Association of Hong Kong (CMAHK), Industrial (Second) constituency and the party Leader of the Business and Professionals Alliance (BPA), the second largest party in the Legislative Council. In the 2016 Legislative Council election, Ng ran unopposed in the CMAHK's Industrial (Second) functional constituency, succeeding Lam Tai-fai in the seat.

== Education and early career ==
Ng graduated with a Bachelor of Laws degree and a Postgraduate Certificate in Laws Degree from the University of Hong Kong. He is a practicing solicitor in Hong Kong and partner of George Tung, Jimmy Ng & Valent Tse, Solicitors and Tung Ng Tse & Heung Solicitors since 1997. He had served as legal adviser of Hong Kong laws of the Foreign Economics Trade Committee of the People's Government of Chongqing City.

== Career ==
Ng has been an Independent Non-Executive Director of Yanchang Petroleum International Limited (alternate name: Sino Union Energy Investment Group Limited) since January 2005 and an Independent Non-Executive Director of China Weaving Materials Holdings Limited since December 2011. He serves as the general committee member and vice-president of the Chinese Manufacturers' Association of Hong Kong (CMAHK) and Hong Kong Chinese Importers' and Exporters' Association and a member of the Chinese People's Political Consultative Conference of Chongqing City.

=== Political career ===
He has been member of the Election Committee, which is responsible for electing the Chief Executive since 2011 through the Industrial (Second) subsector consisting of members of the CMAHK. He has also been appointed to the Radio Television Hong Kong Board of Advisors, the Small and Medium Enterprises Committee and the Commission on Strategic Development. In 2015, he was made Justice of the Peace.

During the 2014 Hong Kong electoral reform of the electoral method for the Chief Executive, Ng represented the CMAHK to submit a report of the Constitutional and Mainland Affairs Bureau, suggesting the four-subsector structure of the nominating committee, which the first subsector represented the business interest, should be maintained. He also said that the "civil nomination" proposal as suggested by some pan-democrats was not incompatible with the Basic Law.

In the 2016 Legislative Council election, Ng ran unopposed in the CMAHK's Industrial (Second) functional constituency, succeeding Lam Tai-fai in the seat.

He joined the pro-business party Business and Professionals Alliance for Hong Kong (BPA) on 11 December 2018 and was appointed as Vice-Chairman of the party.

In December 2021, it was reported that Ng was eligible to vote four times in the 2021 Hong Kong legislative election, yielding 0.0327237% of the total voting value (elected seats), which is 6584 times more than the value of an average voter's total voting value.

In December 2021, Ng was re-elected through the same constituency with 306 votes.

In February 2022, after the Witman Hung birthday party controversy, Ng defended Hung and said that Hung was "just unlucky".

In the 2025 Legislative Council election Ng was re-elected through the same constituency with 246 votes.On 22 December 2025, Ng became the first party leader for Business and Professionals Alliance for Hong Kong. He was elected as Chairman of the LegCo's Finance Committee on 12 January 2026.

Legislative Council of Hong Kong
Preceded by Lam Tai-fai	Member of Legislative Council; Representative for Industrial (Second); 2016–present	Incumbent
Order of precedence
Preceded by Eddie Chu; Member of the Legislative Council	Hong Kong order of precedence Member of the Legislative Council	Succeeded by Junius Ho; Member of the Legislative Council
