= Industrial (Second) =

Hong Kong functional constituency

Industrial (Second) 工業界（第二）
- Functional constituency for the Legislative Council of Hong Kong
- Region: Hong Kong
- Electorate: 474

Current constituency
- Created: 1985
- Number of members: One
- Member: Ng Wing-ka (BPA)

The Industrial (Second) functional constituency (Chinese: 工業界（第二）功能界別) is a functional constituency in the elections for the Legislative Council of Hong Kong first created in 1985. It was one of the 12 original functional constituency seats created for the first ever Legislative Council election in 1985 and is corresponding to the Industrial (Second) Subsector in the Election Committee. The constituency is composed of corporate members of the Chinese Manufacturers' Association of Hong Kong that are entitled to vote at general meetings of the Association. In 2021, there were 592 corporate electors in the constituency.

== Return members ==
| Election | Member | Party |
|---|---|---|
| 1985 | Ngai Shiu-kit | Independent |
| 1988 | Ngai Shiu-kit | Independent |
| 1991 | Ngai Shiu-kit | LDF→Liberal |
| 1995 | Ngai Shiu-kit | Liberal |
Not represented in the PLC (1997–1998)
| 1998 | Lui Ming-wah | Independent |
| 2000 | Lui Ming-wah | Independent |
| 2004 | Lui Ming-wah | Independent→Alliance |
| 2008 | Lam Tai-fai | Independent |
| 2012 | Lam Tai-fai | Independent |
| 2016 | Ng Wing-ka | Independent→BPA |
| 2021 | Ng Wing-ka | BPA |
| 2025 | Ng Wing-ka | BPA |

== Electoral results ==
=== 2020s ===
2025 Legislative Council election: Commercial (Second)
| Party | Candidate | Votes | % | ±% |
|---|---|---|---|---|
| BPA | Ng Wing-ka | 246 | 79.87 | −2.61 |
| Independent | Wong Wai-leung | 62 | 20.13 | |
| Majority | | 184 | 59.74 | |
| Total valid votes | | 308 | 100.00 | |
| Rejected ballots | | 7 | | |
| Turnout | | 315 | 66.46 | −1.65 |
| Registered electors | | 474 | | |
| BPA hold | | Swing | | |

2021 Legislative Council election: Commercial (Second)
| Party | Candidate | Votes | % | ±% |
|---|---|---|---|---|
| BPA | Ng Wing-ka | 306 | 82.48 | |
| Independent | Lo Ching-kong | 65 | 17.52 | |
| Majority | | 241 | 64.96 | |
| Total valid votes | | 371 | 100.00 | |
| Rejected ballots | | 7 | | |
| Turnout | | 378 | 68.11 | |
| Registered electors | | 592 | | |
| BPA hold | | Swing | | |

=== 2010s ===
2016 Legislative Council election: Industrial (Second)
| Party | Candidate | Votes | % | ±% |
|---|---|---|---|---|
| Independent | Ng Wing-ka | Unopposed | | |
| Registered electors | | 769 | | |
| Independent gain from Independent | | Swing | | |

2012 Legislative Council election: Industrial (Second)
| Party | Candidate | Votes | % | ±% |
|---|---|---|---|---|
| Independent | Lam Tai-fai | Unopposed | | |
| Registered electors | | 829 | | |
| Independent hold | | Swing | | |

=== 2000s ===
2008 Legislative Council election: Industrial (Second)
| Party | Candidate | Votes | % | ±% |
|---|---|---|---|---|
| Independent | Lam Tai-fai | Unopposed | | |
| Registered electors | | 790 | | |
| Independent gain from Independent | | Swing | | |

2004 Legislative Council election: Industrial (Second)
| Party | Candidate | Votes | % | ±% |
|---|---|---|---|---|
| Independent | Lui Ming-wah | Unopposed | | |
| Registered electors | | 499 | | |
| Independent hold | | Swing | | |

2000 Legislative Council election: Industrial (Second)
| Party | Candidate | Votes | % | ±% |
|---|---|---|---|---|
| Independent | Lui Ming-wah | Unopposed | | |
| Registered electors | | 624 | | |
| Independent hold | | Swing | | |

=== 1990s ===
1998 Legislative Council election: Industrial (Second)
| Party | Candidate | Votes | % | ±% |
|---|---|---|---|---|
| Independent | Lui Ming-wah | 186 | 63.48 | |
| HKPA | Ngai Shiu-kit | 107 | 36.52 | |
| Majority | | 79 | 26.96 | |
| Total valid votes | | 293 | 100.00 | |
| Rejected ballots | | 0 | | |
| Turnout | | 291 | 82.44 | |
| Registered electors | | 353 | | |
| Independent win (new seat) | | | | |

1995 Legislative Council election: Industrial (Second)
| Party | Candidate | Votes | % | ±% |
|---|---|---|---|---|
| Liberal | Ngai Shiu-kit | Unopposed | | |
| Registered electors | | 753 | | |
| Liberal hold | | Swing | | |

1991 Legislative Council election: Second Industrial
| Party | Candidate | Votes | % | ±% |
|---|---|---|---|---|
| LDF | Ngai Shiu-kit | 216 | 56.54 | |
| Independent | Szeto Fai | 166 | 43.46 | |
| Majority | | 50 | 13.08 | |
| Total valid votes | | 382 | 100.00 | |
| Rejected ballots | | 8 | | |
| Turnout | | 390 | 28.55 | |
| Registered electors | | 1,366 | | |
| LDF hold | | Swing | | |

=== 1980s ===
1988 Legislative Council election: Second Industrial
| Party | Candidate | Votes | % | ±% |
|---|---|---|---|---|
| Independent | Ngai Shiu-kit | Unopposed | | |
| Independent hold | | Swing | | |

1985 Legislative Council election: Second Industrial
| Party | Candidate | Votes | % | ±% |
|---|---|---|---|---|
| Independent | Ngai Shiu-kit | 544 | 94.61 | |
| Independent | Ho Yuk-wing | 31 | 5.39 | |
| Majority | | 513 | 89.22 | |
| Total valid votes | | 575 | 100.00 | |
| Independent win (new seat) | | | | |
