= Shek Pai Wan =

Bay in Hong Kong

Coordinates: 22°15′N 114°09′E

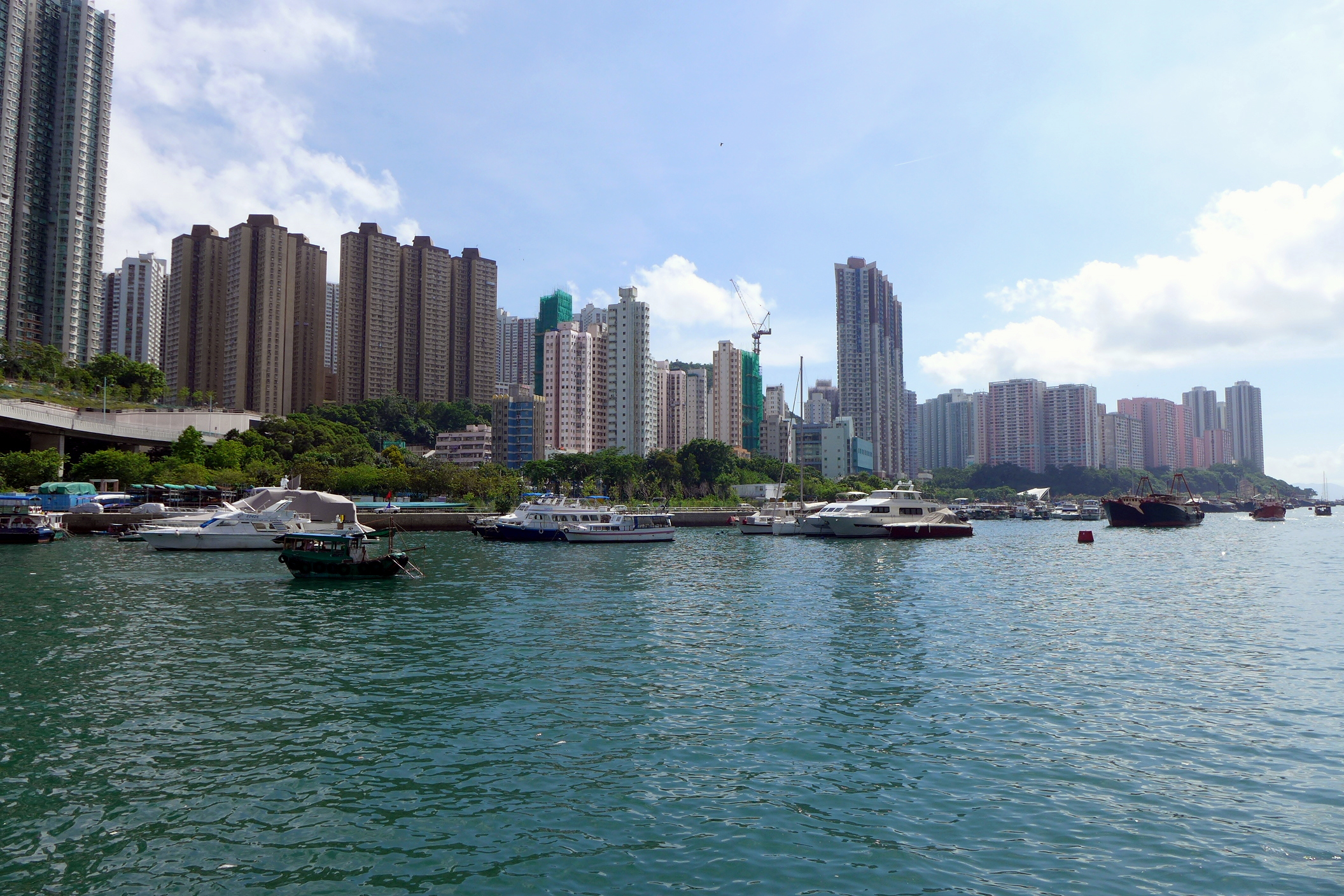
- Shek Pai Wan in 2015
- Traditional Chinese: 石排灣
- Simplified Chinese: 石排湾
- Literal meaning: Stone Row Bay
Transcriptions
Standard Mandarin
- Hanyu Pinyin: Shípáiwān
- Wade–Giles: Shih-pai-wan
Yue: Cantonese
- Yale Romanization: Sehk pàaih wāan
- Jyutping: Sek6 paai4 waan1 or waan4

Shek Pai Wan (Chinese: 石排灣) or Aberdeen Bay is a bay between Aberdeen on Hong Kong Island and Ap Lei Chau (formerly Aberdeen Island). Its name was formerly romanized as Shekpywan. The bay is one of the traditional fishery ports because the hills on two sides forms a nature shelter. The whole bay is zoned as the Aberdeen West Typhoon Shelter.

Currently, Shek Pai Wan usually refers to Shek Pai Wan Estate, a public housing estate in Aberdeen.

== Education ==
Shek Pai Wan is in Primary One Admission (POA) School Net 18. Within the school net are multiple aided schools (operated independently but funded with government money) and Hong Kong Southern District Government Primary School.

== See also ==
- Shek Pai Wan Estate
