= Wong Yan-lung =

Hong Kong barrister

The Honourable Wong Yan-lung GBM, SC
- 黃仁龍
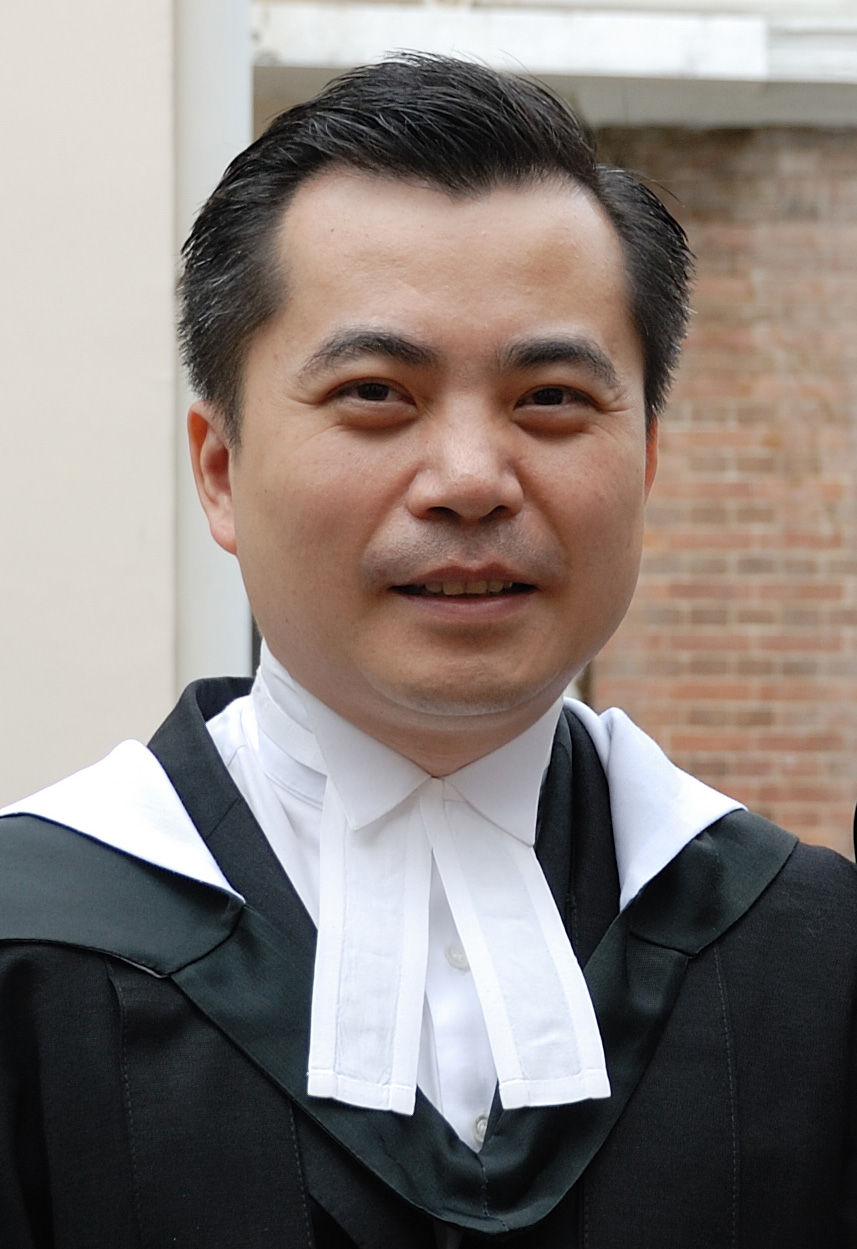

2nd Secretary for Justice of Hong Kong
- In office 20 October 2005 – 30 June 2012
- Chief Executive: Donald Tsang
- Preceded by: Elsie Leung
- Succeeded by: Rimsky Yuen

Personal details
- Born: 1963 (age 62–63)
- Spouse: Esther Chan (陳筱茵)
- Children: Three daughters
- Education: Queen's College, Hong Kong, Magdalene College, Cambridge (BA, MA)
- Profession: Barrister, deputy High Court judge

Wong Yan-lung
- Traditional Chinese: 黃仁龍
- Simplified Chinese: 黄仁龙
Transcriptions
Standard Mandarin
- Hanyu Pinyin: Huáng Rénlóng
Yue: Cantonese
- Jyutping: Wong4 Jan4 Lung4

Wong Yan-lung, GBM, SC (Chinese: 黃仁龍; born 1963) is a barrister in Hong Kong who served as the second Secretary for Justice of Hong Kong between 20 October 2005 and 30 June 2012.

== Early years ==
Wong grew up in a small flat in Tai Wong Street East (大王東街) in Wan Chai. He sold ice cream with his father for a monthly income of HK$300-HK$400. Wong graduated from secondary school at Queen's College in Causeway Bay, Hong Kong. His top marks meant that he secured scholarships every year while studying at the college. In the 1980s, the family moved to Wah Fu Estate in Aberdeen. However, his father continued selling ice cream until Wong returned from studying in England. He read law at Magdalene College, Cambridge while on a Prince Philip Scholarship.

== Career ==
Wong undertook pupillage with Andrew Li, and was the latter's last ever pupil. In 1987, he was called to both the Bar of England & Wales and the Bar of Hong Kong. He was appointed a senior counsel in 2002.

He sat as a deputy High Court judge of the Court of First Instance in July 2003, and was a council member of the Hong Kong Bar Association from 1989 to 1990, from 1997 to 2002, and from 2003 to 2005. He was also chairman of the Special Committee on Legal Education of the Association from 2003 to 2005.

He then served as the second Secretary for Justice of Hong Kong between 20 October 2005 and 30 June 2012, under Donald Tsang Yam-kuen.

Since his retirement from governmental office, Wong has resumed private practice as a barrister at Temple Chambers, with a broad civil and commercial practice. Wong has served as chairman of the Buildings Appeal Tribunal, of the Criminal and Law Enforcement Injuries Compensation Boards, and of the Non-local Higher and Professional Education Appeal Board.

On the Hong Kong Legislative Council oath-taking controversy, Wong described the National People's Congress Standing Committee interpretation of the Basic Law as a "pity" and "avoidable". He added that “from the constitutional and legal perspective, the National People’s Congress Standing Committee undoubtedly has the power to interpret every single clause of the Basic Law ... but at the same time, there is no doubt that such power must be exercised with extreme restraint and only when it is unavoidable”.

When former Chief Executive Donald Tsang was found guilty of one count of misconduct in public office in 2017, Wong personally wrote a ten-page letter of mitigation, stating that "[Tsang's] significant contributions to Hong Kong in the past over 4 decades should be properly recognized."

== Personal life ==
Wong has three daughters with his wife, Esther Chan. He met her while doing charity work between 1991 and 1996, and they married in 1996. He received several hundred thousand Hong Kong dollars as a wedding gift from his wife's wealthy family, which he, in turn, gave to organisations for the homeless.

He is a devout Christian. He has also served as Vice-Chairman of the CEDAR Fund and Member of the Steering Committee and Volunteer of the Hong Kong Christian Concern for the Homeless.

== Awards and honours ==
Wong was elected as a Master of the Bench of the Honourable Society of the Middle Temple in 2007. He was made an Honorary Fellow of Magdalene College, University of Cambridge in 2009. He has also received honorary degrees from Lingnan University, Shue Yan University, the Chinese University of Hong Kong, the Hong Kong University of Science and Technology, the Open University of Hong Kong, and the University of Hong Kong.

Wong received the Grand Bauhinia Medal in 2012.

== See also ==
- Judiciary of Hong Kong
- Legal system of Hong Kong

Political offices
Preceded by Elsie Leung	Secretary for Justice; 2005–2012	Succeeded by Rimsky Yuen
Order of precedence
Preceded by Stephen Lam; Recipient of the Grand Bauhinia Medal	Hong Kong order of precedence Recipient of the Grand Bauhinia Medal	Succeeded by Peter Woo; Recipient of the Grand Bauhinia Medal
