= Lam Tai-fai =

Hong Kong politician

Lam Tai Fai SBS, BBS, JP
- 林大輝
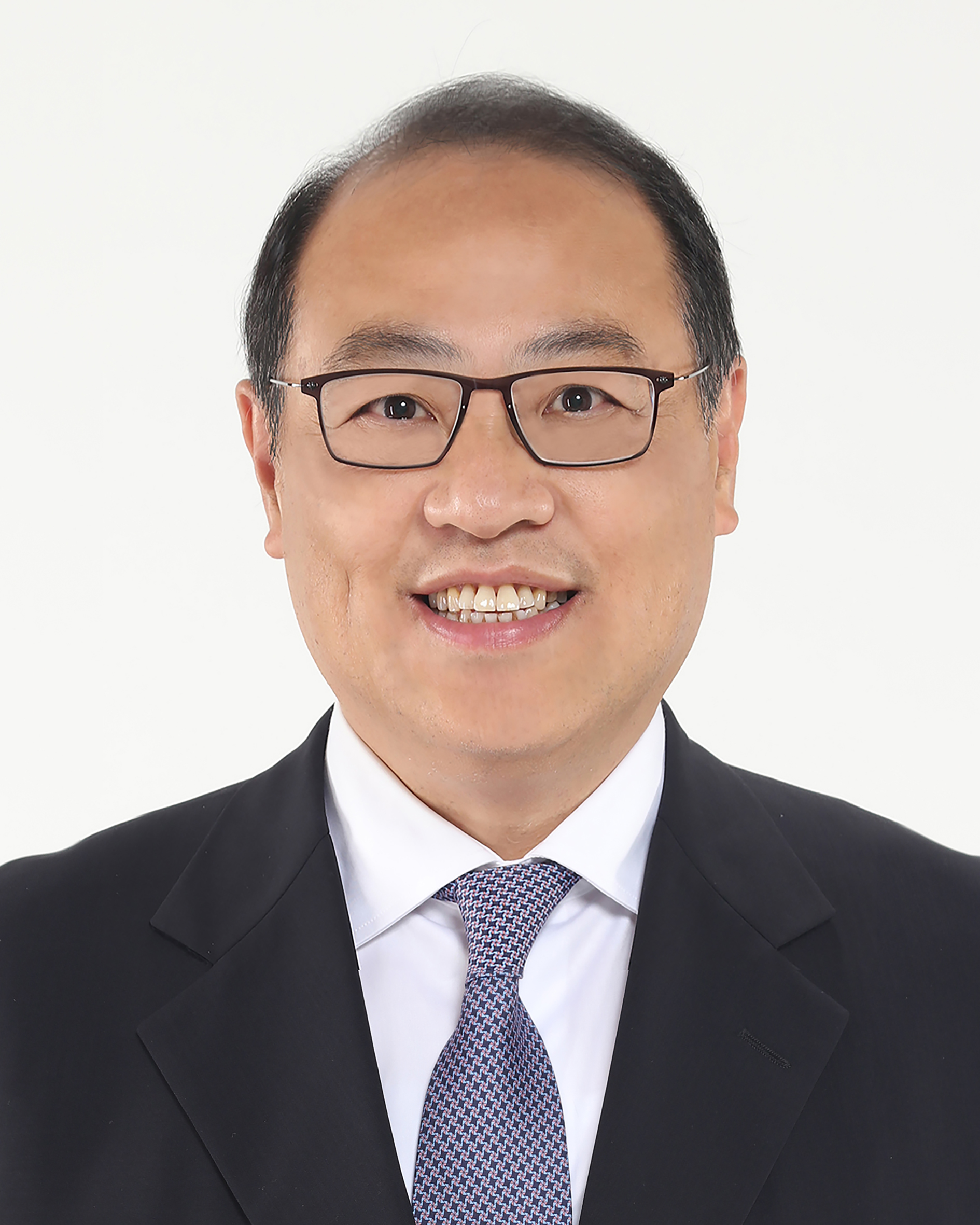

Member of the Legislative Council of Hong Kong
- In office 1 October 2008 – 30 September 2016
- Constituency: Industrial (Second)
- Preceded by: Lui Ming-wah
- Succeeded by: Ng Wing-ka

Appointed member of Sha Tin District Council
- In office 2004–2007

Personal details
- Born: 22 November 1959 (age 66) Ping Shan, Yuen Long District, Hong Kong
- Education: Hong Kong Polytechnic University
- Awards: Gold Bauhinia Star Silver Bauhinia Star Bronze Bauhinia Star

Lam Tai-fai, SBS, BBS, JP (Chinese: 林大輝) is a Hong Kong politician. He serves as Chairman of the Council of the Hong Kong Polytechnic University and Chairman of the Hong Kong Sports Institute (HKSI). He was a member of the Legislative Council of Hong Kong for the Industrial Functional Constituency from 2008 to 2016. In 2008 he began service as a committee member on the 11th, 12th and 13th National Committees of the Chinese People's Political Consultative Conference, and as a standing member of the 11th and in 2009 joined 12th Henan Provincial Committees of the Chinese People's Political Consultative Conference.

== Early life ==
He graduated from the Fung Kai No. 1 Secondary School. Lam completed his higher diploma in textile technology at Hong Kong Polytechnic in 1981.

== Career ==
He started his career as a trainee in the fashion and clothing industry, rising to managing director with Peninsula Knitters Ltd ten years later.

=== Business ===
Lam was appointed to leading roles in capacities such as chairman of the Clothing Industry Training Authority and Vice President of the Independent Police Complaints Council. His experience in industry made him valued by trade and commerce associations. He served as vice president of The Chinese Manufacturers’ Association of Hong Kong (CMA), vice chairman of the Textile Council of Hong Kong, executive vice chairman of The Hong Kong General Chamber of Textiles, president of the Hong Kong Woollen and Synthetic Knitting Manufacturers’ Association, chairman of The Hong Kong Institution of Textiles and Apparel (HKITA), vice president of the Hong Kong Young Industrialists Council, deputy chairman of the Federation of the Hong Kong Chiu Chow Community Organizations, founding vice president of the New Territories Chiu Chow Federation, and vice president of The Scout Association of Hong Kong.

=== Politics ===
In 2007, he began full-time participation in political affairs. He became an appointed member of the Shatin District Council in the same year. In 2008, he ran for the 4th Legislative Council election and won the seat in the trade-based Industrial (Second) functional constituency. He was re-elected in the 5th Legislative Council in 2012. He was also chairman of the Education Panel of the Legislative Council from 2012 to 2016.

=== Sports ===
He served as chairman of the Rangers Football Club and Happy Valley Athletic Association football team in the 1990s. He ran the Shatin Sports Association from 2007 to 2011, leading the club from third division to the first division. He serves as honorary president of the Handball Association of Hong Kong.

He was a public supporter of the 2009 East Asian Games and was named a 2008 Beijing Olympic torch bearer in the Hong Kong Torch Relay. In 2016, Lam worked with the South China Athletic Association (SCAA) to develop a youth football training programme in support of football promotion at schools and in community districts.

Lam was appointed director of the Hong Kong Sports Institute (HKSI) from 2009 to 2015 and became chairman on 1 April 2017. He is a member of the Sports Commission of the Hong Kong Sports Institute Limited (HKSI) and member of Major Sports Events Committee of the HKSAR.

=== Foundation ===
Lam established the Lam Tai Fai Charitable Foundation, a charitable foundation, in 2001. In 2004, Lam Tai Fai College (LTFC), supported by his charitable foundation, opened in Shatin, where he took the roles of supervisor and chairman of Incorporated Management Committee (IMC). Lam Tai Fai College is a Direct Subsidy Scheme (DSS) secondary school.

In 2006, Lam expanded to work on improving basic education on the mainland and embarked on an educational project to build primary schools in rural areas across the country. The project launched in provinces such as Henan, Qing Hai, Hubei and Yunnan, encompassing 30 schools.

=== Horses ===
Lam owns various racehorses. They all have the word “Fantasy” in their names. In 2010, “Ultra Fantasy” won the championship in the Sprinters Stakes in Japan. This was the first ever international Grade 1 horse race won by a Chinese trainer, Chinese jockey and Chinese owner in Hong Kong horse racing history.

=== Television ===
In 2019, Lam played a judge in episode 17 of the TVB TV programme The Defected.

=== RTHK ===
Lam also serves as the head of the RTHK advisory board. In January 2021, he agreed with a ruling against RTHK's satirical show "Headliner," and said that RTHK management should educate staff to not let it happen again.

== Public Services ==
In January 2019, he became Chairman of the Council of The Hong Kong Polytechnic University for a term of 3 years.

In January 2022, his Chairmanship of the Council of The Hong Kong Polytechnic University was extended for 3 years. In August 2022, Lam said that PolyU has risen from the Siege of the Hong Kong Polytechnic University, was now "stronger" with "more energy and momentum" and that "Riots can never stop the SAR government to fully and accurately implement the one country, two systems principle, nor stop PolyU to continue to develop healthily."
