= Green Paper on Constitutional Development =

The Green Paper on Constitutional Development was a consultation document released by the Government of Hong Kong Special Administrative Region on July 11, 2007. It marked the first green paper published by the region since its establishment in 1997. The document focused on political reform within the framework of the Hong Kong Basic Law, particularly the methods by which the chief executive and Legislative Council would be elected, as well as the timetable for these reforms.

The green paper proposed various options for the nomination and election processes for both the chief executive and Legislative Council, with the goal of achieving universal suffrage. It outlined several models for the composition of the nominating committee for the chief executive and the process for nominating candidates. The consultation period lasted until October 11, 2007, during which public feedback was gathered. This feedback was considered in evaluating different potential paths for implementing universal suffrage, with options ranging from direct suffrage for the chief executive in 2012 to a phased approach, with full suffrage possibly reached by 2017.

Despite these efforts to engage the public and explore options for reform, the Green Paper's proposals faced significant opposition and challenges. The political debates surrounding universal suffrage continued, culminating in the 2014 Umbrella Movement, which called for broader democratic reforms. The tensions between Hong Kong and Beijing, particularly regarding the pace and scope of political changes, further complicated the reform process.

The green paper remains a critical document in Hong Kong's political reform history, serving as a foundation for ongoing debates about democracy and political change in the region.

== Contents ==
The following are the options provided by the green pPaper in regard to electing the chief executive.

On the size on the nominating committee, the options are:

- Fewer than 800 members (60 of which are Legislative Council members)
- 800 members
- More than 800 members

On the number of candidates, the options are:

- 10 or more (requiring less than 12.5% of the nomination by the Election Committee)
- At most 8 (requiring 12.5% of the nomination by the Election Committee)
- 2 to 4 (requiring 25% of the nomination by the Election Committee)

On the roadmap and timetable for implementing universal suffrage for electing the CE, the options are:

- As early as 2012
- A "transitional phase" in the 2012 election and attaining universal suffrage in 2017
- After 2017

The following are the options provided by the green paper with regard to reforming the Legislative Council:

- Replace functional constituencies seats with district-based seats returned through direct election
- Retaining functional constituencies seats, but change the electoral method
- Increase the number of seats representing District Councils in Legislative Council

On the roadmap and timetable for implementing universal suffrage for Legislative Council, the options are:

- Directly in 2012
- In phases in 2016
- In phases after 2016

== See also ==
- Politics of Hong Kong
- 2010 Hong Kong electoral reform
