= Shek Pai Wan Estate =

Housing estate in Aberdeen, Hong Kong

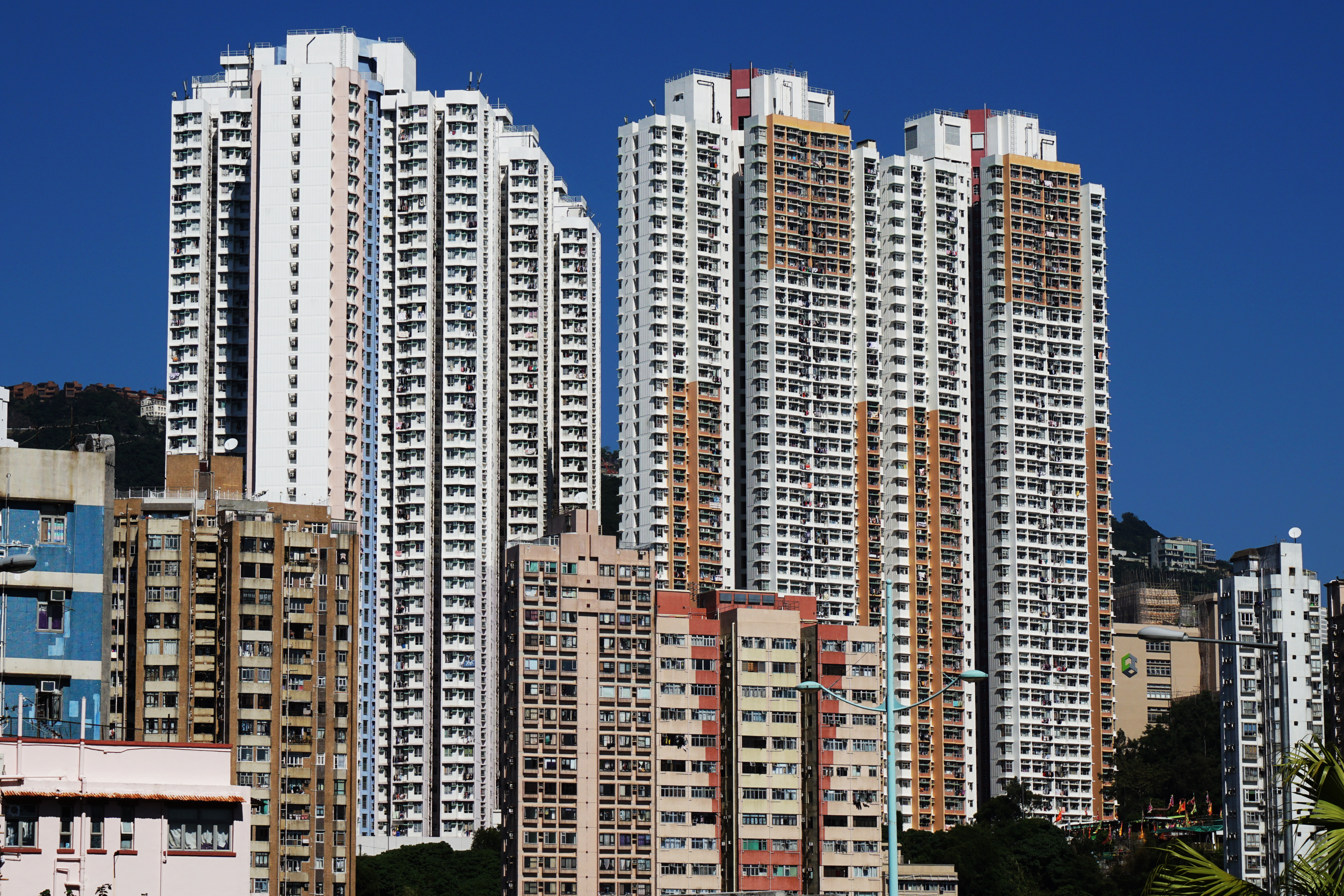
- Shek Pai Wan Estate
- Interactive map of Shek Pai Wan Estate

General information
- Location: 68 Yue Kwong Road, Aberdeen, Hong Kong
- Coordinates: 22.2489°N 114.1576°E
- Status: Completed
- Category: Public rental housing
- Population: 13,780 (2016)
- No. of blocks: 8
- No. of units: 5,300

Construction
- Authority: Hong Kong Housing Authority

Shek Pai Wan Estate
- Chinese: 石排灣邨
- Cantonese Yale: sehk pàaih wāan chyūn
Transcriptions
Yue: Cantonese
- Yale Romanization: sehk pàaih wāan chyūn
- Jyutping: sek6 paai4 waan1 cyun1

Shek Pai Wan Estate (Chinese: 石排灣邨) is a public housing estate in Shek Pai Wan of Aberdeen, Hong Kong, on a hill to the east of the town centre. It comprises eight standard residential blocks, a non-standard small household block, a primary school, a shopping centre and a bus terminus.

== Background ==
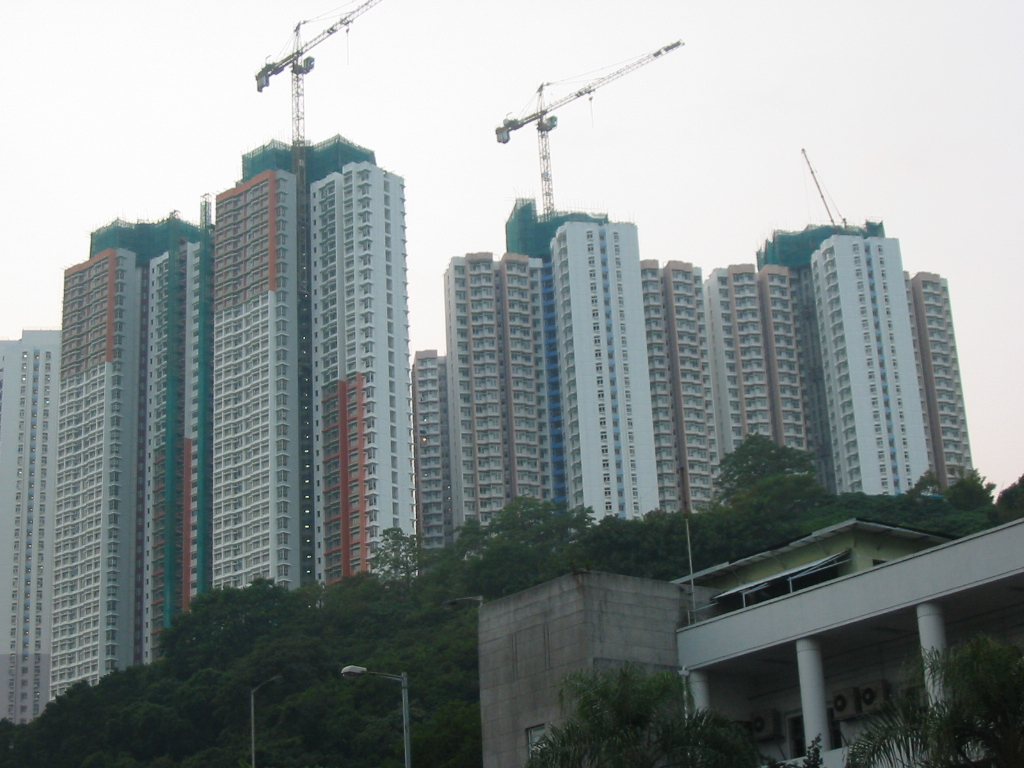
Pictured during redevelopment

Shek Pai Wan Estate was a resettlement estate and it consisted of seven blocks built between 1966 and 1968. In 1985, Block 2 was found to have structural problems by the Hong Kong Housing Authority, so it was firstly demolished in 1988.

The estate started redevelopment in 1998 and the redevelopment project was divided into three phases. However, Phases 1 and 2 were combined and renamed as Phase 1 whereas Phase 3 was renamed as Phase 2 later. There are seven new blocks completed in 2005 and 2007 respectively. Some of the flats were used to accommodate the displaced tenants of the demolished Wong Chuk Hang Estate.

== Houses ==
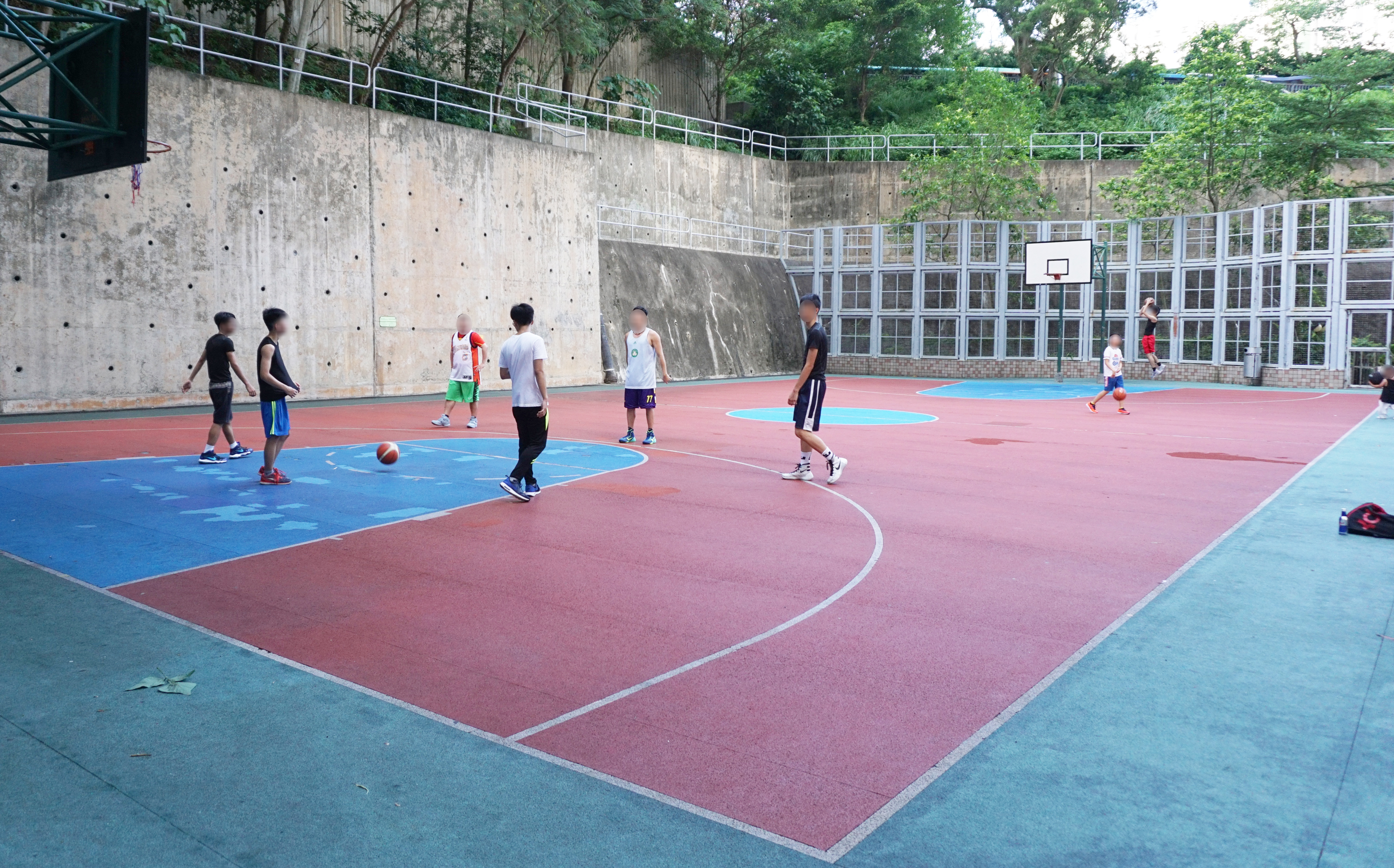
Basketball court

Shek Pai Wan Estate has eight residential blocks with a total of around 5,300 flats.

| Name | Type | Completion |
|---|---|---|
| Pik Fai House | Small Household Block | 2005 |
| Pik Ngan House | New Harmony 1 | 2005 |
| Pik Long House | New Harmony 1 | 2005 |
| Pik Yuet House | New Harmony 1 | 2005 |
| Pik Yuen House | New Harmony 1 | 2007 |
| Pik Shan House | New Harmony 1 | 2007 |
| Pik Wai House | New Flexi Block | 2007 |
| Pik Luk House | New Flexi Block | 2007 |

== Demographics ==
According to the 2016 by-census, Shek Pai Wan Estate had a population of 13,780. The median age was 49.3 and the majority of residents (98 per cent) were of Chinese ethnicity. The average household comprised 2.7 persons. The median monthly household income of all households (i.e. including both economically active and inactive households) was HK$17,780.
