= Chinese Manufacturers' Association of Hong Kong =

- Abbreviation: CMA
- Formation: 1 September 1934; 92 years ago
- Legal status: Not-for-profit organisation
- Location: CMA Building, 64-66 Connaught Road Central, Central, Hong Kong
- Region served: Hong Kong
- Members: Over 3,000
- President: Dr Lo Kam Wing
- Website: Chinese Manufacturers' Association

The Chinese Manufacturers' Association of Hong Kong (CMA; Chinese: 香港中華廠商聯合會) is a not-for-profit chamber of commerce established on 1 September 1934 and one of the most representative non-profit-making industrial associations in Hong Kong. With over 3,000 member companies from various business sectors, the CMA is committed to promoting Hong Kong’s industrial and commercial development. CMA plays an active part in the formulation and implementation of trade and industrial policies. It has been designated as a functional constituency to represent the industry, such that CMA members have the voting right to elect a representative to sit on the Legislative Council to relay industry opinions.

To keep abreast of the developments and business opportunities across the world, it receives more than 100 delegations annually. CMA also regularly sends trade missions to various Mainland cities and overseas countries and participates in international trade fairs with a view to promoting Hong Kong industry and fostering international cooperation. It operates an office in Guangzhou to provide support to members in the Mainland and to strengthen communication with the Mainland authorities and associations. CMA is also authorised by the Government to issue all kinds of certificates of origin and to operate EDI Service Centres.

CMA Testing, a subsidiary of the Association, is an independent and internationally accredited quality assurance institution that offers a wide range of services, including inspection, testing, certification, and technical consulting. CMA Testing has also expanded its services to technology commercialisation, aligning with the city’s strategies to promote new industrialisation and technological development.

CMA strives to build a better community, and places much emphasis on human resource development. Aside from operating two secondary schools, it also grants scholarships annually to outstanding students and makes donations to tertiary institutions regularly.

== Objectives ==
The CMA's primary objectives are:

- Promoting trade and industrial development
- Improving the business environment
- Representing the industrial sector in the formulation and implementation of Government policies
- Participating in community development work
- Fostering international understanding and co-operation
- Fulfilling corporate social responsibility

== General Committee ==
President

- Dr Lo Kam Wing

Legislative Council Representative

- The Hon Ng Wing Ka, Jimmy

Executive Vice President

- Dr Ma Kai Yum

Vice Presidents

- Wong Ka Wo, Simon
- Ng Kwok On, Dennis
- Leung Siu Yin, Jackson
- Chan Ka Wai, Calvin
- Lok Pak Keung, Robert
- Ivan Sze
- Chuang Ka Pun, Albert
- Dr Wong Wai Hung, Ellis

Permanent Honorary Presidents

- Herbert Liang
- The Hon Chan Wing Kee
- Dr the Hon Yu Sun Say, Jose
- Hung H H, Peter
- Yin T S, Paul
- Dr Wong Y K, David
- Irons Sze
- Dr Ng Wang Pun, Dennis
- Dr Shi Lop Tak, Allen
