= List of Chinese University of Hong Kong alumni =

This list of Chinese University of Hong Kong alumni includes notable graduates and non-graduate former students from the Chinese University of Hong Kong, a public research university in Shatin, Hong Kong. Established in 1963 by a charter granted by the Legislative Council of Hong Kong. It is the territory's second oldest university and was founded as a federation of three existing colleges – Chung Chi College, New Asia College and United College – the oldest of which was founded in 1949.

Today, CUHK is organised into nine constituent colleges and eight academic faculties, and remains the only collegiate university in the territory. The university operates in both English and Chinese, although classes in most colleges are taught in English.

== Academia and research ==
Name	Class year(s)	Degree(s)	College	Notability	Reference
Yuk-shee Chan		B.B.A.		President of the Lingnan University of Hong Kong (2007–13)	
Shiu-Yuen Cheng		B.S.		Mathematician	
Lai-yung Ruby Leung				Atmospheric scientist	
Simon Lui	2003	B.S.		Computer music researcher	
Vivian Li	2003			Cancer scientist who identified a new way that Wnt is activated in bowel cancer	
Joseph Sung	1997	M.D.	—	Vice-chancellor of the Chinese University of Hong Kong (2010–present)	
Mei-Ching Fok	1980	BSc		Astrophysicist at the Goddard Space Flight Center, winner of NASA Exceptional Scientific Achievement Medal	
Lap-Chee Tsui	1972; 1974	B.S. M.Phil.	New Asia	Geneticist; vice-chancellor and president of the University of Hong Kong (2002–14)	
Shing-Tung Yau	1969	B.S.	Chung Chi	Mathematician; Fields Medal recipient (1982); Wolf Prize in Mathematics (2010)	
Ying-shih Yu	1952	B.A.	New Asia	Historian; tenured professor at Harvard University, Yale University, and Princeton University	
Philip Kam-tao Li		M.D.		Nephrologist and academic physician; President of the Hong Kong Academy of Medicine	

== Arts and entertainment ==
Name	Class year(s)	Degree(s)	College	Notability	Reference
Wong Hoi Kan	1985	M.A.	New Asia	Singer-songwriter	
Simon Chung		M.A.	—	Film director	
Hoi-Lam Au	2001; 2004; 2009	B.A. M.F.A. M.Phil.		Painter	
Michael Hui		B.S.	United	Actor, comedian, director, and screenwriter; recipient of the 1982 Hong Kong Film Award for Best Actor for his role in Security Unlimited	
Lee Kit	2003; 2008	B.A. M.A.		Contemporary artist	
Sin Tung Ko	2009		—	artist	
Ying-Tong Lai		M.A.	—	Songwriter, arranger, and performer	
Warren Chi-Wo Leung	1990; 1997	B.A. M.F.A.		Visual artist	
Sammy Leung	1994		New Asia	DJ, MC, and actor	
Paul Lin		B.S.		Songwriter, composer, and radio host	
Sheung Chuen Pak	2002	B.A.		Artist	
Wilson Shieh	1994; 2001	B.A. M.F.A.		Painter	
Wong Chi Hang Sara	1992	B.A.		Artist	
Wong Xiang Yi	2010	B.A.		Graphic artist	

== Business and finance ==
Name	Class year(s)	Degree(s)	College	Notability	Reference
Vincent Cheng	1973	B.S.	New Asia	Chairman of HSBC China (2005–11); chairman of The Hongkong and Shanghai Banking Corporation (2005–10)	
Chung-kong Chow	1981	M.B.A	—	Chairman of Hong Kong Exchanges and Clearing; chief executive officer of the MTR Corporation	
Shui-ming Chung		M.B.A	—	Chairman of the Hong Kong Housing Society	
Antonia Li		M.B.A.		business woman and philanthropist	
Ricky Wong	1985; 2005	B.S. M.B.A		Chairman of Hong Kong Television Network (1992–present); founder of Hong Kong Broadband Network; chief executive officer of Asia Television (2008)	

== Government, law, and public policy ==
Name	Class year(s)	Degree(s)	College	Notability	Reference
Gary Chan		B.S. MSSc		Member of the Legislative Council from the New Territories East constituency (2008–present)	
Kenneth Chan	1990	Bachelor of Social Science		Member of the Legislative Council from the Hong Kong Island constituency (2012–present); chairman of the Civic Party (2011–12)	
Norman Chan	1976	B.S.	Chung Chi	Chief Executive of the Hong Kong Monetary Authority (2009–present)	
Pamela Chan	1968	B.A.	Chung Chi	Chief Executive of the Hong Kong Consumer Council (1985–2007)	
Paul Chan		B.S. M.B.A.	New Asia	Financial Secretary (2017-); Secretary for Development (2012–2017); member of the Legislative Council from the Accountancy constituency (2008–12)	
Shou-lum Chen		D.S.		Member of the Legislative Council (1976–87); member of the Executive Council (1983–87)	
Michael Cheng		M.A.	Graduate School	Member of the Legislative Council (1988–91)	
Man-kwong Cheung	1978	B.A.	New Asia	Member of the Legislative Council from the Education constituency (1991–97, 1998–2012); president of the Hong Kong Professional Teachers' Union (1990–2010)	
Ann Chiang		M.A.	—	Member of the Legislative Council from the Kowloon West constituency (2012–present)	
Florence Hui		B. B. A.		Undersecretary for the Home Affairs Bureau (2008–present)	
Sum Lam	1992	BSc	Chung Chi	Patent attorney	
Siu-lai Lau		B.S.Sc., M.Phil., Ph.D.		Member of the Legislative Council from the Kowloon West constituency (2016–present)	
Ming-kwai Lee	1972	B.A.	New Asia	Commissioner of Police (2003–07)	
Julia Leung		B.S.Sc.		Undersecretary for the Financial Services and the Treasury Bureau (2008–13)	
Ka-lau Leung		B.S.		Member of the Legislative Council from the Medical constituency (2008–present)	
Priscilla Leung		B.S.Sc.	United	Member of the Legislative Council from the Kowloon West constituency (2008–present)	
Bruce Liu	1983; 2002	B.A. M.A.		Member of the Legislative Council from the Kowloon Central constituency (1995–1998)	
Wai-kwok Lo		B.S. M.S.		Member of the Legislative Council from the Engineering constituency (2012–present)	
Kitty Poon		PhD	Graduate School	Undersecretary for the Environment Bureau (2008–present)	
Chung-kai Sin	1997	M.B.A.	Graduate School	Member of the Legislative Council from the Hong Kong Island constituency (2012–present)	
Samson Tam		B.S.		Member of the Legislative Council from the Information Technology constituency (2008–12)	

== Journalism and media ==
Name	Class year(s)	Degree(s)	College	Notability	Reference
Yuen-Ying Chan		M.A.	—	Journalist	
Lavender Cheung	1993	B.S.Sc.	New Asia	News anchor at Cable TV Hong Kong (1998–2009)	

== Religion ==
Name	Class year(s)	Degree(s)	College	Notability	Reference
John Tong Hon		M.A.	—	Cardinal of the Roman Catholic Church; Bishop of Hong Kong (2009–present)	

== Social reformers/activists ==
Name	Class year(s)	Degree(s)	College	Notability	Reference
Kin-man Chan	1983	B.A.	Chung Chi	Former Associate Professor of Sociology, CUHK; Co-founder of Occupy Central with Love and Peace	

== Sports ==
Name	Class year(s)	Degree(s)	College	Notability	Reference
Yuen-ting Chan	2010	B.S.		Football manager; first female manager to lead a men's professional association football team in a nation's top domestic division to a league championship	
Rebecca Chiu		B.S.		Squash player; gold medalist in women's singles at the 2002 Asian Games	
Daniel Lee	1999	B.S. M.S.	Shaw	Triathlete; silver medalist at the 2008 Asian Games; participant at the 2004 and 2008 Summer Olympics	
So Ning Mak		B.S.		Triathlete; participant at the 2008 Summer Olympics	
Christy Yiu	2011	B.S.		Long-distance runner; participant at the 2016 Summer Olympics	
Yu Chui Yee		B.S.		Wheelchair fencer	

== Notes ==
- Blank cells indicate missing information; em-dashes (—) in the "Class year(s)" column indicate that the alumnus attended but never graduated from CUHK; em-dashes (—) in the "College" column indicate that the alumnus didn't attend CUHK as an undergraduate, and therefore wasn't a member of a college
