= Political Appointments System =

Hong Kong political system

- Chinese: 香港政治委任制度
Transcriptions
Standard Mandarin
- Hanyu Pinyin: Xiānggǎng Zhèngzhì Wěirèn Zhìdù
Yue: Cantonese
- Yale Romanization: Hēung góng jing jih wāi yahm jai douh
- Jyutping: Hoeng1 gong2 zing3 zi6 wai2 jam6 zai3 dou6

In Hong Kong, the Political Appointments System is a scheme introduced by then Chief Executive Donald Tsang in 2008 to reinforce the government's ministerial team by superseding the Principal Officials Accountability System and inserting two layers of politically appointed officials below the secretaries, who are political appointees. These appointees report only to the secretaries, but not the permanent secretaries, the highest-ranking civil servants. The appointment of undersecretaries and political assistants is an extension of the previous RPAS that was initially confined to principal officials. Prior to the introduction, there were 14 political appointees—3 Secretaries of Departments and 11 Directors of Bureaux.

The 24 newly created non-civil-service positions under this system comprise 11 undersecretaries and 13 political assistants. All the posts were created, ostensibly to work closely with bureau secretaries and top civil servants to implement the Chief Executive's policy blueprint and agenda in an executive-led government. Eight new undersecretaries were named on 20 May, and nine political assistant appointments were announced on 22 May 2008.

There was widespread criticism of four aspects of the appointments: the nationality, salary, experience of appointees, and the transparency of the recruitment process. The government admitted that "the announcements were poorly handled". Donald Tsang was forced to make a grudging apology. The public furore led Hong Kong affairs in-charge Xi Jinping to refer to "the recent difficulties", and to urge Tsang to "govern sensibly and reasonably."

== Background ==
In mid-2005, Chief Executive Donald Tsang mooted a system for developing political career path for aspiring politicians by creating middle-ranking posts. Constitutional Affairs minister Stephen Lam said he hoped arrangements would help extend opportunities for political participation and widen the pool of talent whilst preserving a permanent, professional and politically neutral civil service. He promised more ideas would be announced in the Chief Executive's Policy Address in October, saying proposals would be open for consultation by the civil service, political groups and the community.

On 26 July 2006, the government issued its proposal for political appointees, under which two new posts, deputy directors of bureaux and assistants to directors would be added to the political appointment layer for each of Hong Kong's 11 policy bureaux. Thus, each director will be assisted by the two new appointees constituting the political team; civil servants would carry out the administrative and executive tasks of the Government.

There was some confusion on the launch of the consultation paper: Donald Tsang had informed the press corps on 17 July, during his Singapore trip, that the proposal would be launched at the end of the summer vacation. However, its passage through the Executive Council was reportedly hastened as a result of the heightened debate on universal suffrage driven by Regina Ip and Anson Chan, undeclared candidates in the 2007 Hong Kong Island by-election.

=== Premise of the system ===
Launching a four-month public consultation, Secretary for Constitutional and Mainland Affairs, Stephen Lam, said all current permanent and deputy secretaries would continue with their duties such as studying, justifying and designing government policies, while the newly appointed deputy directors would assist bureau chiefs in liaising with legislators and provide political input in policy formulation and implementation; the assistants to bureau directors would line up suitable appointments to help bureau chiefs reach out to the community. Lam further argued that Hong Kong's political team of 14 Policy Secretaries was too thin compared with Canada and the United Kingdom, for example, where two or three layers of ministers speak on behalf of the government. The changes would strengthen governance and preserve the civil-service system. The proposal appeared to coincide with the ideas contained in a study by the Bauhinia Foundation to increase civic engagement launched in early July 2007.

Lam said that the appointments would not be limited to members of pro-government political parties. He said, however, that candidates for the new posts must support the manifesto and ruling philosophy of the chief executive. The government declared a broader objective of widening and grooming the pool of political talent, in preparation for universal suffrage. These new posts would be open to candidates from within or outside the civil service, and with or without political background. Offered as a further safeguard to neutrality of the civil service, Lam further detailed that there would be no "revolving door" – civil servants taking up these political posts would leave the civil service and be barred from returning.

It was proposed that a deputy director be paid 65–75% of the salary received by a bureau chief, or between HK$193,774 and $223,586 (US$25,000–28,700) a month; an assistant would receive 35–50% of the bureau chief's salary, or between HK$104,340 and $149,057 a month. Their contracts would expire no later than 30 June 2012. In addition to HK$11.9 million for personal secretaries and drivers, the total annual cost would be about HK$60 million.

=== Initial reaction to the proposals ===
Lau Kong-wah, vice chairman of the government-friendly Democratic Alliance for the Betterment and Progress of Hong Kong (DAB) remarked that two more directorate-level layers may make it less easy to implement government policies. He was also concerned that the extra spending be value for money.

Frontier convenor Emily Lau said the requirement for new appointees to agree with the chief executive's philosophy suggested the government was merely looking for a way to offer well-paid jobs to its supporters. Democratic Party chairman Lee Wing Tat said the proposal was tailor-made for the DAB.

Margaret Ng of the Civic Party expressed concern that the political appointments would only further delay the move towards universal suffrage, as it would encourage people to align themselves to a pro-government party. She doubted that it would nurture independent and civic-spirited individuals, as it "excludes those who do not blindly support the chief executive."

=== Finalised proposals ===
The government released a report on the subject, ostensibly after taking into account the views received during the public consultation. On 14 December 2007, the Legislative Council Finance Committee approved the government expenditure for the appointments.

== Announcement of appointments ==
The government named eight newly appointed undersecretaries on 20 May, and nine Political assistants on 22 May 2008 as part of the Chief Executive's policy blueprint and agenda in an executive-led government. Tsang described the appointments as a millstone in the development of Hong Kong's political appointment system.

Three appointees were members of the Beijing-friendly DAB, one from the Liberal Party, two were associated with the Bauhinia Foundation. According to corporate governance activist David Webb, no fewer than 7 of the appointees had been identified by the press as being close to the foundation, which lobbies for a range of big business and Beijing central government friendly proposals.

=== Undersecretaries ===
The undersecretaries are appointed under the political appointment system on non-civil service terms for the period ending 30 June 2012.

Romanised name	Chinese name	age at appointment	Foreign nationality	Portfolio attachment	Prior occupation	Govt salary
Chen Wei-on, Kenneth	陳維安	43	N/A	Education	Director of Racecourse Business, HKJC	HK$223,585
Hui Hiu-fai, Florence	許曉暉	34	N/A	Home Affairs	Head of Bus. Planning and Devt., Standard Chartered Bank	HK$223,585
Leung Fung-yee, Julia	梁鳳儀	48	British	Financial Services and the Treasury	Executive Director, HKMA	HK$223,585
Leung, Gabriel Matthew	梁卓偉	35	Canadian	Food and Health	Professor, HKU	HK$208,680
Poon Kit, Kitty	潘潔	45	US	Environment	Asst Professor, PolyU	HK$208,680
Tam Chi-yuen, Raymond	譚志源	44	British	Constitutional and Mainland Affairs	Deputy Secretary for Home Affairs	HK$208,680
So Kam-leung, Gregory	蘇錦樑	49	Canadian	Commerce and Economic Development	Solicitor	HK$223,585
Yau Shing-mu	邱誠武	48	N/A	Transport and Housing	Executive Editor, Hong Kong Economic Times	HK$208,680

=== Political assistants ===
The political assistants are appointed under the expanded political appointment system on non-civil service terms for the term ending 30 June 2012.

Romanised name	Chinese name	age at appointment	Foreign nationality	Portfolio attachment	Prior occupation	Govt salary
Chan Chi-yuen, Paul	陳智遠	28	N/A	Food and Health	Research assistant, City University	HK$134,150
Cheung, Raymond Man-to	張文韜	46	N/A	Education	Barrister	HK$134,150
Choy Siu-min, Linda	蔡少綿	37	N/A	Environment	Director of Government Relations, Hong Kong Disneyland	HK$149,055
Lo Yik-kee, Victor	盧奕基	55	British	Security	Assistant Police Commissioner (ret'd)	HK$134,150
Mok Yee-tuen, Zandra	莫宜端	35	N/A	Labour and Welfare	Journalist;Senior Manager, Bauhinia Foundation	HK$134,150
Ng Kit-shuen, Katherine	伍潔鏇	34	Singaporean	Financial Services and the Treasury	legal director, Merrill Lynch HK	HK$163,960
Tsui Ying-wai, Caspar	徐英偉	31	Canadian	Home Affairs	Investment Services Manager, Hang Seng Bank	HK$134,150
Yip Kan-chuen, Frankie	葉根銓	38	N/A	Financial Secretary	Public Affairs Manager, HK Jockey Club	HK$134,150
Young Chit-on, Jeremy	楊哲安	32	British	Food & Health	Logistician	HK$134,150

== Controversies ==
=== Nationality row ===
A row immediately ensued when the Democrats sought to attack Gregory So and other appointees over their foreign passports. The government maintained that this was not prohibited by the Basic Law. Donald Tsang said the Basic Law's right-of-abode requirements only applied to a small number of principal officials of the Government and the Judiciary. Tsang added that restricting the posts to those without overseas abode rights would be detrimental to the aim of absorbing and grooming more talented political hopefuls.

"The Hong Kong situation is unique – as long as you live in Hong Kong for seven years, you can be a voter as well as undersecretary," Executive Council convener Leung Chun Ying said. "The Basic Law does not differentiate political and non-political appointments. It only requires the chief judge to be a Chinese and less than 1/5 of the Legislative Council members have foreign nationality," Leung added. He said it would be improper to add further requirements outside what the Basic Law has specified.

Albert Cheng argued that the Democratic Party's stance was putting the principle of "one country, two systems" at risk. An editorial in The Standard said that a nationality restriction would reduce the pool of potential talent available for government, and accused "the opposition" of singling out So because of his membership of the DAB.

However, there was a tide of criticism from three former senior government officials, amongst others, of the government's handling of the new political appointees: former Treasury Secretary John Chan said the government was "politically insensitive" while Regina Ip said the administration displayed "political misjudgement"; former Secretary for the Civil Service Joseph Wong said the public has the right – and expectation – to know" about the nationalities and salaries of the appointees.

The government had asked appointees not to make individual comments on the matter. However, on 29 May, Gregory So broke silence and said he would renounce his Canadian citizenship; Raymond Tam surrendered his British Passport. As at 4 June 2008, five undersecretaries had declared they were giving up their foreign passports citing public opinion as an overriding factor, and one assistant had also initiated the renunciation process.

Speaking in the legislative council on 4 June, Stephen Lam defended the government stance. He said that the Basic Law made it clear that Principal Officials must be Chinese citizens and Hong Kong permanent residents with no right of abode in a foreign country. He pointed out that deputy directors of bureau were not principal officials, are not appointed by the Central People's Government, and as such are not prohibited from having right-of-abode in a foreign country. He added that even when deputising for Bureau Chiefs in their absence, the acting arrangement is "an administrative measure only" and does not contravene the Basic Law". Donald Tsang said that people returning from emigration have helped make Hong Kong a success; the recruitments were "part of the Government's drive to attract talented people from different backgrounds to provide an efficient and stable civil service". He hoped that the public would accept that the five undersecretaries with foreign right-of-abode, who had renounced those rights were committed to the city, and would put the matter to rest.

=== Transparency issue ===
Only days after the nationality row had been quelled, another one erupted over appointees' individual quantum salary levels, as well as whether they were justified. Up to that point, the government had only banded the disclosure that undersecretaries would be paid monthly stipend of between HK$193,773 to HK$223,586, and that political assistants would receive between HK$104,340 and HK$163,963 for their services. Citing common practices in the private sector and in overseas governments, Tsang said the Government would not release individual salaries to "avoid unnecessary comparison" and in the respect of individuals' right to privacy. On 5 June, the South China Morning Post lodged a complaint with the Ombudsman for access to information on appointees salaries.

Pressure for disclosure continued to mount, and on 10 June 2008, the new-appointees all came forth and revealed their salaries. The Government news release stated that the appointees had "voluntarily disclosed their salaries, given the sustained public interest in the issue." Political commentator Frank Ching criticised the government's cowardice for hiding behind the appointees.

On revealing the individual salaries of the appointees, the government faced further questions about the apparent lack of relevant experience of some appointees. Citing the example of Paul Chan, reportedly earning between HK$20,000 and 30,000 [in the private sector], Liberal Party leader James Tien said it was "unreasonable to see that he will be earning at least $130,000." Democrats continued to pressure the government for information on its precise selection standards and how it scored the new appointees, and the factors determining their pay; CEO of CLP Group, and chairman of Hong Kong General Chamber of Commerce, Andrew Brandler, said the government should have been transparent from the outset.

Pan-democrats continued to charge that the recruiting of political appointees was a "black-box operation", but Chief Secretary Henry Tang defended the transparency of the process. Donald Tsang said that the public had been "widely consulted" on the proposal. Tsang added: "Although the mechanism is different from that of civil servants, impartiality and internal checks and balances were already included – [the appointments had been] scrutinised and approved by a recruitment committee." Tsang said the recruitment process was "rigorous". The new undersecretaries pledged to co-operate with civil servants and lawmakers, to listen to public views, and to win people's trust and recognition.

=== Government responses and apology ===
Director of the Chief Executive's Office, Norman Chan, admitted the government had underestimated the public reaction on the nationality of political appointees. Chan said the appointees' pay scale was geared to attracting the most capable candidates. He stressed the salaries could not be compared with those of civil servants, who had housing, travelling and other allowances. The salaries of undersecretaries were roughly the same as those of directorate four civil servants. They would enjoy a pay review in two years, but without guarantee of an increase.

Donald Tsang apologised for the government's bungled announcement of new political appointees, saying: "With hindsight, I admit the arrangements in this regard did not fully meet public expectations, and I apologise for the controversy this has caused." Tsang apologised for not having arranged for the new appointees to meet the public, whilst maintaining there were important points of principle to defend vis à vis the appointees' remuneration and nationalities. Reacting to criticism from Joseph Wong, he said "...the most stupid thing is to have politics override law and to give up some principles for the sake of political convenience. In the long run, these are the biggest mistakes in politics and stupidity." Tsang's apology was seen as 'grudging' and 'reluctant'.

In a continued attempt to contain the row, Stephen Lam said on 16 June that the future appointees would be contractually bound to reveal their salaries and be advised to disclose their nationalities. He also stated that their pay could be adjusted upwards or downwards, and that their contracts could be terminated on one month's notice.

=== Scope issue ===
The row refused to subside even after the official apology for the mishandling. The lack of clarity of the appointees' scope of responsibilities, and the need for another layer of bureaucrats, has also been questioned. Although salaries of the appointees has been blown out of proportion, according to Andrew Brandler, he suggested that "the government was put in a tight spot because the role of the new appointees is undefined." Leading figures in education lamented the "waste of HK$4m" for their sectorial deputies, and expressed their concern about the exact roles Kenneth Chan and Jeremy Young would play. A source within the Education Bureau was quoted as saying there was surprise in government: "...a lot of people are asking why they are worth being paid that much."

An editorial in The Standard remarked that the criticism from former senior civil servants was a reflection of the fact that top civil servants, who used to be responsible for their respective domains, had needed to get accustomed to the changes in their responsibilities. It further suggested that administrative officers might take even longer to accept the undersecretaries and political assistants in view of their limited political experience and regardless of their potential.

=== Salary comparison ===
The undersecretary's pay of HK$220,000 per month (US$28,000) is more than the salary of US Secretary of State Condoleezza Rice, and also more than Alan Greenspan earned as the chairman of the US Federal Reserve. A political assistant would earn more than what Tony Snow earned (US$14,000 per month) as the former White House Press Secretary.

Political observer Michael Chugani said there was no "single credible reason why these novice politicians are being paid more than heads of state of some countries." Lau Ngai-keung was sceptical that political appointments would help to foster local political talent, noting that such appointees may earn up to six times more than Legislative Councillors. Tsang asked the public not to make a hasty judgement at this early stage, as there was no completely objective standard to judge appointees' value except by their performance. Gregory So, Florence Hui and Gabriel Leung said their appointments were not about money but serving the community.

The appointment set off wage rise claims from unions representing civil servants. In September 2008, the HK Federation of Civil Service Unions said that political assistants remuneration levels was seriously damaging morale within the civil service. Its chairman said "many civil servants with years of professional management experience are not paid at [the level of 28-year-old novice Paul Chan']", and petitioned the government to have the pay levels independently reviewed.

=== Other criticisms ===
An opinion piece in the Asia Times suggested the scheme would reward loyalists, bolster support for Tsang and please Beijing, under cover of fostering political talent. Only two of the eight new deputies have professional backgrounds that can recommend them for the position, thus reminding the author of the chief executive's "bent to surround himself with lightweight, Beijing-friendly political lackeys loathe [sic] to offer dissenting views."

Frank Ching believes that the system of political appointees has eroded the importance of the civil service, the highest-ranking of whom now implement policies instead of draw them up. He implied that the decline in morale since 2002, due to three successive layers of political appointees being introduced, has caused once loyal and silent bureaucrats such as John Chan and Joseph Wong to criticise the government vocally. Anson Chan said that Tsang had failed to understand the real concerns of citizens. "The fiasco highlights the unsustainability of a political appointment system that lacks a popular mandate."

In an op-ed, Joseph Wong said Legislative Councillors shared the blame by having given the government "unfettered discretion" for the nomination process. He observed that when the proposed scheme was before Legco, councillors failed to ask the government to explain or clarify what specific criteria or guidelines the Appointments Committee and principal officials would use.

On his official visit to Hong Kong in July 2008, Hong Kong affairs in-charge Xi Jinping made some comments which were taken in some quarters as being a thinly veiled criticism of Tsang. Xi advised Tsang how the "difficulties" he faced [in making the appointments] could be overcome:

"Our expectations for the administration team can be summed up in two phrases: [govern] sensibly and reasonably; solidarity and high efficiency"

— Xi Jinping, meeting with principal Hong Kong officials on 7 July 2008

== Legislative Council debate to force disclosure ==
The Democratic Party tabled a motion to invoke Legislative Council (Power and Privileges) Ordinance to force the government to disclose the criteria for choosing and justification for making each appointment, and for determining their remuneration. It was scheduled for a vote on 26 June 2008.

Donald Tsang delivered an unprecedented 20-minute speech prior to the start of the debate on a motion tabled by Lee Wing Tat in an attempt to quell the criticism. Tsang lectured the chamber about there having been "excessive" argument about the subject. "It is about time we put an end to it... We should dedicate all our energies to the things that are important to the people of Hong Kong, especially the livelihood issues," Tsang said. Tsang denied Norman Chan had shown favouritism during the selection process, saying "It was unfair to those appointees who were identified as Chan's people. Chan knows people from various sectors." After his speech, Tsang refused to take questions; his speech was followed by those by the Chief Secretary and the Secretary for Justice.

Lee's motion was defeated, as expected (22:29:1), after some seven hours of heated debate. The Standard observed that Tsang's attempt to assert his leadership had backfired. Tsang's performance was criticised as "dismissive" and "contemptuous" by the Legal sector legislator, Margaret Ng.

The economy may be uppermost in the minds of most people, but... [t]he lack of transparency and accountability over this whole affair smacks too much of the cronyism which Hong Kong people most fear, not least because it is a precursor of corruption.

— Margaret Ng, 3 July 2008, South China Morning Post
