= Uganda Kwan =

Uganda Sze Pui Kwan (Chinese: 關詩珮；关诗珮) is director of the Master of Arts in Translation and Interpretation (MTI) Programme and an associate professor at Nanyang Technological University (NTU), Singapore.

Uganda Kwan earned her PhD from the School of Oriental and African Studies (SOAS), University of London, in Dec 2007. Before joining NTU, she was awarded a Monbukagakushō (Japanese government) scholarship in 2002 and pursued postgraduate research at the University of Tokyo, where she later held the position of Project Associate Professor in 2009. Her academic experiences in Japan shaped her research. She took part in decade-long research projects and academic activities led by Japanese scholar Professor Shōzō Fujii, funded by the Japan Society for the Promotion of Science (JSPS), the Science Council of Asia (SCA) and the Ministry of Education, Culture, Sports, Science and Technology (MEXT), among others.

Uganda Kwan has held affiliated and visiting appointments at institutions including University College London (2010, 2014), Harvard University (2014), Princeton University (2017), the University of Cambridge (2018) and National Taiwan University (2024). She served as an international PhD co-supervisor at UCL with Professor Theo Hermans. During her affiliations with Harvard University, she organised two academic conferences, "China in Translation (jointly funded by Fairbank Center for Chinese Studies, Chiang Ching-kuo Foundation, and NTU" and "CrissCrossing China: Literature and Thoughts From Late Qing to Early Republican China (funded by Harvard–Yenching Institute)". When she was invited to Princeton University in 2017, she gave several lectures on gender translation, Hong Kong studies, and Opium War interpreters. In 2018, she was awarded a scholarship and affiliated with the Needham Research Institute for a medical interpreting project. She has served as the Principal Investigator for 21 research projects, several of which are ongoing. These projects have been funded by organizations including ASPIRE (Asian Science and Technology Pioneering Institutes of Research and Education), The Sumitomo Foundation, the Hong Kong Arts Development Council, the Singapore Centre for Chinese Language, the Needham Research Institute at the University of Cambridge, the Rare Book School at the University of California, Los Angeles (UCLA), Singapore's Ministry of Education, and the Ministry of Digital Development and Information. In 2024, she was awarded a fellowship by the University Alliance in Talent Education Development (UAiTED).

Her research in translation studies focuses on the intersections of history, culture, and language, with an emphasis on Sinophone communities from the 19th century to the present. Her work encompasses subfields such as gender studies, print technologies, medical interpreting, and science translation. Kwan's research has sought to recover the voices of historical interpreters and translators who were previously thought to have left no records or notes of their interpretations or translations. Among the figures she has studied are the Opium War interpreter Samuel Turner Fearon (1819–1854) and the science translator Rev. E.T.R. Moncrieff (1824–1857). Her work was shortlisted for the Barwis Holliday Award by the Royal Asiatic Society in 2014 and won a book prize in Hong Kong in 2019. She also translates her own work and has published bilingually, with publications appearing in Journal of Chinese Studies (Institute of Chinese Studies at The Chinese University of Hong Kong), The Bulletin of the Institute of Modern History (Academia Sinica, Taiwan), A New Literary History of Modern China (Harvard University Press), Journal of Translation Studies (A&HCI), Journal of Chinese Philosophy (A&HCI), and the Journal of the Royal Asiatic Society of Great Britain and Ireland (Cambridge Core).

In addition to her academic work, Kwan is involved in institutional and professional service. She serves as an elected Senate Member at NTU and Chair of the Ethics Review Committee within the School of Humanities at NTU. She is an editorial board member for the Sungkyun Journal of East Asian Studies (A&HCI), published by Duke University Press, and serves on the Ministry of Education's Curriculum Review Panel in Singapore.

Uganda Kwan supervises PhD students in several schools and programmes, including the School of Humanities at NTU, the Interdisciplinary Graduate Programme (jointly with the College of Computing and Data Science, NTU), the College of Humanities, Arts and Social Sciences (CoHASS), and the Department of Architecture at the College of Design and Engineering, National University of Singapore (NUS). Their research topics include the art history of contemporary Singapore and Malaysia, Qing-era architectural history in China, and the print history of the Straits Settlements, with translation as a common element of their interdisciplinary research.
