= Nicholas Ng =

Hong Kong government official

Nicholas Ng Wing-fui
- Traditional Chinese: 吳榮奎
- Simplified Chinese: 吴荣奎
Transcriptions
Standard Mandarin
- Hanyu Pinyin: Wú Róngkuí
Yue: Cantonese
- Jyutping: ng4 wing4 fui1

Nicholas Ng Wing-fui, GBS, CBE, JP (Chinese: 吳榮奎; born 20 November 1946) is a former Hong Kong government official and former chairman of the Public Service Commission.

== Biography ==
Ng graduated from the University of Hong Kong in 1970 with a Bachelor of Social Science (BSocSc) and joined the Hong Kong government in June 1970. He served briefly as an Assignment Officer and then as an executive officer II before transferring to the Administrative Service in August 1971. He was Deputy Secretary for the Civil Service from November 1985 to February 1987, Deputy Secretary for Trade and Industry from February to July 1987, deputy director of the Information Services Department from July 1987 to March 1989, Secretary-General of the Standing Commission on Civil Service Salaries and Conditions of Service from May 1989 to May 1991 and Director of Administration from June 1991 to January 1994.

He rose to be Director of Bureau in January 1994 when he was appointed Secretary for Constitutional Affairs, which office he held until August 1997 when he was appointed Secretary for Transport, a role he held until April 2002. He retired from the government in July 2003. In 2005, he was appointed chairman of the Public Service Commission, where he stayed until his retirement in April 2014.

Government offices
| Preceded by Michael Sze | Secretary for Constitutional Affairs; 1994–1998 | Succeeded by Michael Suen |
| Preceded by Gordon Siu | Secretary for Transport; 1997–2002 | Succeeded by Sarah Liao as Secretary for the Environment, Transport and Works |
