= Adeline Wong =

Hong Kong politician and businesswoman

Adeline Wong Ching-man
- 黃靜文

Undersecretary of the Constitutional and Mainland Affairs Bureau
- In office 2 November 2009 – 30 June 2012
- Secretary: Stephen Lam; Raymond Tam
- Preceded by: Raymond Tam
- Succeeded by: Lau Kong-wah

Personal details
- Born: 9 September 1964 (age 61)

Adeline Wong Ching-man (Chinese: 黃靜文, born 9 September 1964) is a businesswoman and a former Hong Kong politician and civil servant who is the former Undersecretary of the Constitutional and Mainland Affairs Bureau from 2009 to 2012. As a retired politician, she is the chief executive officer of the Chinese Manufacturers' Association of Hong Kong.

Adeline became an Administrative Officer of the Hong Kong Government in 1990. She was an administrative assistant to former Chief Secretary Rafael Hui prior to his appointment as Undersecretary of the Constitutional and Mainland Affairs Bureau.
