= Donald Liao =

Hong Kong civil servant and architect (1929–2026)

Donald P. H. Liao CBE, JP
- 廖本懷
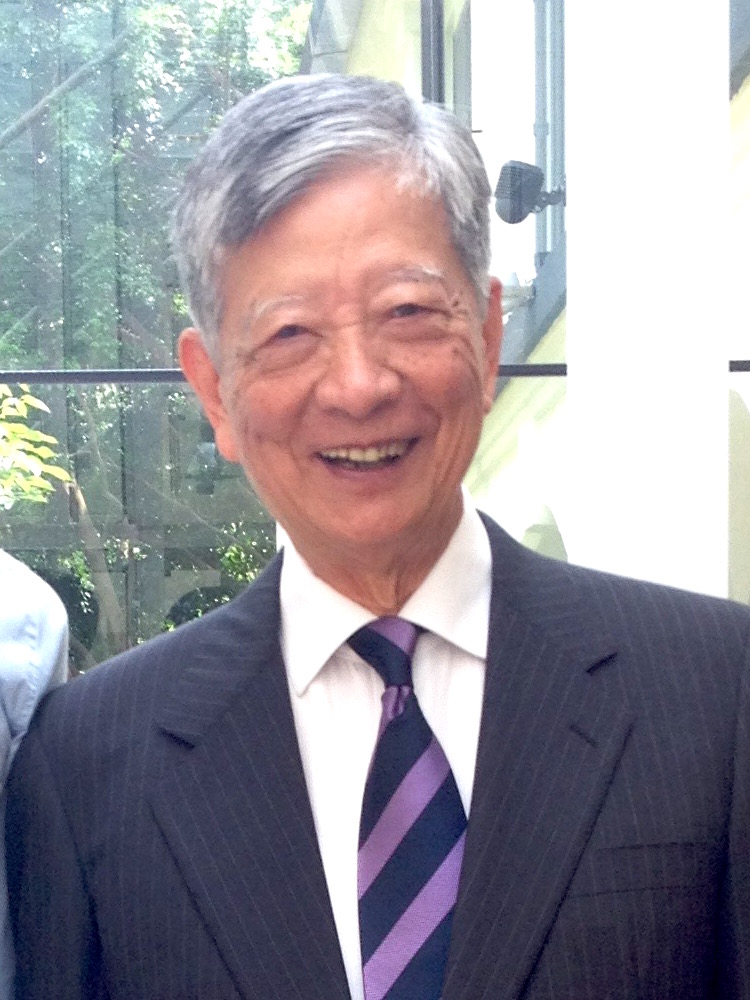
- Liao in 2013

Secretary for District Administration
- In office February 1985 – October 1989
- Governor: Sir Edward Youde; Sir David Wilson
- Preceded by: David Akers-Jones
- Succeeded by: Peter Tsao

Secretary for Housing
- In office 15 May 1980 – 10 February 1985
- Governor: Sir Murray MacLehose; Sir Edward Youde
- Preceded by: Alan James Scott
- Succeeded by: David Robert Ford

Personal details
- Born: 29 October 1929 Kobi, Tainan Prefecture, Taiwan, Empire of Japan
- Died: 12 March 2026 (aged 96) Hong Kong
- Spouse: Christine Yuen Ching Me
- Children: 3
- Education: St. Joseph's College; University of Hong Kong; Durham University

Donald Liao Poon-huai, CBE, JP (Chinese: 廖本懷; 29 October 1929 – 12 March 2026) was a Taiwanese-born Hong Kong government official and landscape architect. He took an instrumental role in the expansion of the public housing in Hong Kong in the 1960s and 70s, designing new types of public estates and was Secretary for Housing and chairman of the Hong Kong Housing Authority from 1980 to 1985. He became the Secretary for District Administration from 1985 to 1989.

== Early life and education ==
Liao was born in Yunlin County (part of Tainan Prefecture under Japanese rule), Taiwan on 29 October 1929. He moved to Hong Kong to learn English after finishing his basic education in Taiwan. He attended the St. Joseph's College, Hong Kong and subsequently the University of Hong Kong. He later furthered his study at the King's College of the Durham University after winning a British Council scholarship, where he graduated with a degree in landscape design.

== Government career ==
Liao became the first member of the Hong Kong Institute of Landscape Architects. In 1960, he started working for Hong Kong government's Housing Division, designing and managing some of Hong Kong's biggest social housing projects during the 1960s and 70s at the time of the Ten-Year Housing Programme carried out by Governor Murray MacLehose. He took a leading role in revolutionising social housing in order the address the overcrowding housing condition. He applied his own design in Wah Fu Estate, the "Twin Tower Block": like Scottish "Z-plan" castles, these each comprised two juxtaposed towers of a hollow, internally galleried plan. The second design innovation was an adaptation of the comprehensive land-use planning of the English New Towns.

He later joined the Hong Kong government to become the Commissioner of Housing in 1968 and a member of the Town Planning Board. He proposed the Home Ownership Scheme, which allowed those who lived in rented public housing to buy their own flats. He became Secretary for Housing and chairman of the Hong Kong Housing Authority from 1980 to 1985. He kept on serving in several senior government posts including the Secretary for District Administration from 1985 until his eventual retirement in 1989. During his government service, he was also an official member of the Hong Kong Legislative Council in 1980 and of the Hong Kong Executive Council in 1985. He was also a member of the Sino-British Joint Liaison Group. He served on the Council of the Hong Kong Stock Exchange from 1991 to 1995. In 1992, he was appointed Hong Kong Affairs Advisor by the Beijing government.

== Personal life and death ==
Liao married ballet dancer Christine Yuen Ching Me, who is better known by her stage name, Mao Mei, in 1963. They have three children. He was also a member of the Hong Kong Jockey Club.

Liao died in Hong Kong on 12 March 2026, at the age of 96.

== Honours ==
For his public service, he was appointed Officer of the Order of the British Empire (OBE) in the 1972 Birthday Honours, and promoted to Commander of the Order of the British Empire (CBE) in the 1983 New Year Honours. In 2011, he was made Honorary Doctor of Science at the Durham University.

== See also ==
- Public housing in Hong Kong

Government offices
Preceded by Alan James Scott	Secretary for Housing; 1980–1985	Succeeded by David Robert Ford
Preceded by David Akers-Jones	Secretary for District Administration; 1985–1989	Succeeded by Peter Tsao as Secretary for Home Affairs
