= Cheung Man-yee =

Hong Kong government official (born 1946)

Cheung Man-yee SBS, ISO, JP
- 張敏儀
- Cheung in 1970

Director of Broadcasting
- In office 1986–1999
- Preceded by: C.S. Wilkinson
- Succeeded by: Chu Pui-hing

Director of the Information Services
- In office 1985–1986
- Preceded by: Peter Tsao
- Succeeded by: John Chan

Hong Kong Economic and Trade Representative to Tokyo
- In office 15 December 1999 – May 13, 2002
- Preceded by: Paul Leung Sai-wah
- Succeeded by: Alex Fong Chi-wai

Personal details
- Born: 25 December 1946 (age 79) British Hong Kong
- Education: Chung Chi College, Chinese University of Hong Kong (Bachelor of Arts in English)
- Profession: Bureaucrat, producer, TV Presenter
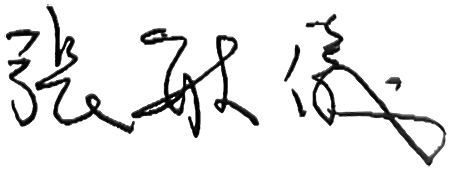
- Signature
- Nickname: The Big Sister of Hong Kong

Cheung Man-yee SBS ISO JP (simplified Chinese: 张敏仪; traditional Chinese: 張敏儀) is a retired Hong Kong producer and bureaucrat who became the first Chinese person to become Director of Broadcasting (head of Radio Television Hong Kong) in the Hong Kong Government. She was the Executive Producer of Below The Lion Rock, a TV show in Hong Kong released in 1972 that became highly popular during the 1970s.

She joined Radio Television Hong Kong as a Programme Officer in 1972. From 1999 to 2002 she was the principal Hong Kong Economic and Trade Representative in Tokyo, Japan.

Cheung Man-yee is currently the Honorary Vice Chairman of the Shun Hing Education and Charitable Foundation of Hong Kong, an organization to fund and promote education, sports and culture.

== Early life and education ==
Cheung Man-yee was born in Hong Kong on 25 December 1946, she attended Precious Blood Secondary School in her early years. In the 1964 Hong Kong Certificate of Education Examination she got five A's, allowing her to be awarded a scholarship into university. She graduated from the English Department of Chung Chi College at CUHK in 1968, with a Bachelor's degree in Arts in English.

In 1996 Chueng completed the national studies training programme at Tsinghua University course for Senior Civil Servants which was intended to be a general introduction to Mainland China's politics, laws and economy.

== Career ==
During her time at CUHK, she worked part time at ATV, translating foreign shows into Chinese. After graduation she worked as an assistant director at ATV along with hosting multiple TV shows on ATV. She later left ATV around 1971 and, following RTHK's establishment of their own Television Department, joined RTHK in 1972. After participating in the production of a series of documentaries in Hong Kong and Taiwan, Cheung produced Below The Lion Rock, a famous film in Hong Kong during the 1970s. Following the production of Below The Lion Rock, she was promoted from director to producer at RTHK.

In 1981, she was promoted to the head Director of RTHK. Between 1983 and 1985, she was also the Assistant Director of the Information Services Department and between 1985 and 1986, the Director of the Information Services. In 1986 she became the first native Chinese and first female Director of Broadcasting at RTHK, who was the leading official of RTHK who managed the entirety of RTHK. During the 1997 handover, she staunchly defended the press freedom and independence of RTHK against the government, which caused her to be transferred to Tokyo as the Economic and Trade Representative to Tokyo in 1999. She resigned from office in May 13, 2002 and subsequently retired from all government and media positions. She was succeeded as the Economic and Trade Representative to Tokyo by Alex Fong.

Her stance on RTHK independence and press freedom has caused her to be criticized by multiple Pro-Beijing and Chinese officials, along with numerous media outlets calling RTHK a unregulated domain. Her defense of press freedom has coined her the nickname "The Big Sister of Hong Kong".

== Hong Kong Letters Incident ==
In 1999, President of the Republic of China (Taiwan) Lee Tung-hui proposed the two state theory in which the Republic of China and People's Republic of China would recognize that they were two separate countries with special diplomatic, cultural and historic relationship. At that time, Cheng An-kuo, Taiwan's representative to Hong Kong, was invited to the RTHK program 'Hong Kong Letters' (香港家書) to explain the two state theory. He was severely criticized by Beijing and Hong Kong officials, including Chief Executive Tung Chee-hwa, for making remarks inappropriate for his position. In October 1999, the Hong Kong Government announced Cheung's transfer to Tokyo, Japan, to serve as the Economic and Trade Representative to Tokyo. Many media outlets suggested this was because of her defense of press freedom and the Hong Kong Letters incident.

== Honors and awards ==
Throughout her career as a media executive and government official she has been awarded numerous Honors and Rewards.

- Hong Kong's Ten Outstanding Young People - 1980
- Imperial Service Order (ISO) - 1992
- Silver Bauhinia Star (SBS) - 2002
- Honorary Fellowship of the Chinese University of Hong Kong - 2003
