= Bauhinia Foundation Research Centre =

- Type: Non-profit
- Industry: Public policy
- Founded: March 2006
- Headquarters: Admiralty, Hong Kong
- Services: Research
- Website: www.bauhinia.org (defunct)

Bauhinia Foundation Research Centre
- Traditional Chinese: 智經研究中心
Transcriptions
Yue: Cantonese
- Yale Romanization: Ji gīng yìhn gau jūng sām
- Jyutping: Zi3 ging1 jin4 gau3 zung1 sam1

The Bauhinia Foundation Research Centre was a privately funded public policy think tank in Hong Kong. The organisation stated that its aim was "to promote the understanding of the 'one country, two systems' arrangements in Hong Kong and other socioeconomic policies in Hong Kong, for public benefit."

The Bauhinia Foundation Research Centre emerged as a leading advocate of policy to the administration of Hong Kong Chief Executive Donald Tsang. Of eight undersecretaries and nine political assistants appointed in May 2008 as part of the Tsang administration's plan to "groom political talents," seven were identified by governance activist David Webb as having close ties with the Bauhinia Foundation.

In the subsequent (first) CY Leung government of Hong Kong, the think tank was said to be "struggling to retain its relevance". However, its Undersecretary for Home Affairs, Florence Hui Hiu Fai, had a senior planning role at Standard Chartered, where Bauhinia Foundation chairman Norman Chan was formerly vice-chairman for Asia, and she also served on the foundation's Health Care Study Group. And the Political Assistant to the Secretary for Home Affairs, Zandra Mok Yee Tuen, was a senior manager at the foundation.

The foundation formally dissolved in March 2022.

== Funding ==
The foundation's opaque funding – it did not reveal the identities of its supporting trust's donors – made its eligibility for tax exempt status controversial.

== Management ==
From 2012, the chairman of the foundation was Donald Li Kwok-tung.

== See also ==
- List of think tanks in Hong Kong
