= Lau Kong-wah =

Former Hong Kong government official

Ray Lau Kong-wah JP
- 劉江華
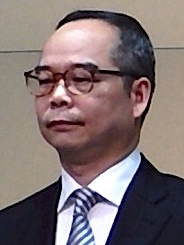

Secretary for Home Affairs
- In office 21 July 2015 – 22 April 2020
- Chief Executive: Leung Chun-ying; Carrie Lam
- Preceded by: Tsang Tak-sing
- Succeeded by: Caspar Tsui

Under Secretary of the Constitutional and Mainland Affairs
- In office 21 December 2012 – 21 July 2015
- Secretary: Raymond Tam
- Preceded by: Adeline Wong
- Succeeded by: Ronald Chan

Non-official Member of the Executive Council of Hong Kong
- In office 14 October 2008 – 30 June 2012
- Appointed by: Donald Tsang
- Preceded by: Jasper Tsang
- Succeeded by: Starry Lee

Member of the Legislative Council
- In office 1 July 1998 – 30 September 2012
- Preceded by: New parliament
- Succeeded by: Elizabeth Quat
- Constituency: New Territories East
- In office 21 December 1996 – 30 June 1998 (Provisional Legislative Council)

Personal details
- Born: 22 June 1957 (age 69) British Hong Kong
- Party: United Democrats (1991–93); Civil Force (1993–present); DAB (1998–present)
- Spouse: Muk Fei-man
- Education: St. Paul College; Sir Robert Black College of Education; University of Exeter; City Polytechnic of Hong Kong.

Lau Kong-wah
- Traditional Chinese: 劉江華
- Simplified Chinese: 刘江华
Transcriptions
Standard Mandarin
- Hanyu Pinyin: Liú Jiānghuá
Yue: Cantonese
- Yale Romanization: Làuh Gōng-wàh
- Jyutping: Lau^{4} Gong^{1}-waa^{4}

Ray Lau Kong-wah, JP (born 22 June 1957) is a former Hong Kong Government official and former member of both the Legislative Council and the Executive Council. Until 2020, he was Secretary for Home Affairs.

Lau was vice-chairman of the pro-Beijing Hong Kong political party, the Democratic Alliance for the Betterment and Progress of Hong Kong (DAB), after founding the similarly aligned Civil Force in 1993. Before that, he was a member of a pro-democracy party, United Democrats of Hong Kong, one of the predecessors of the Democratic Party.

== Early life, family and education ==
Ray Lau Kong-wah was born in Hong Kong.

== Political career ==
Lau was a member of the United Democrats of Hong Kong (a predecessor of the Democratic Party). After losing in the 1991 LegCo election, running as 'Ray Lau', he left the party and founded the Civil Force. He subsequently joined the DAB in 1998.

On 14 October 2008, Chief Executive Donald Tsang appointed Lau a non-official member of the Executive Council, filling the vacancy left by the resignation of Jasper Tsang, a role he held, in parallel with his Legco seat, until June 2012.

In 2012, Lau lost his seat in the 2012 Hong Kong Legislative Council Election.

On 20 December 2012, he was appointed undersecretary for constitutional and mainland affairs by Chief Executive CY Leung, tasked with overseeing political reforms. During the 2014 Occupy movement, as one of five officials representing the government in the televised debate with student representatives, he was mocked for saying not a word, and was then widely represented as hiding inside a typical Hong Kong rubbish bin.

On 21 July 2015, Leung moved Lau to the role of Secretary for Home Affairs, a post he held through into the administration of Carrie Lam. He was removed from the post in a cabinet reshuffle on 22 April 2020.

Political offices
| New constituency | Member of Sha Tin District Board; Representative for Tsang Tai Uk; 1985–1999 | Succeeded by Leung Chi-kin |
| New title | Member of Regional Council; Representative for Sha Tin West; 1986–1994 | Succeeded by Ching Cheung-ying |
| New constituency | Member of Regional Council; Representative for Sha Tin South; 1994–1999 | Council abolished |
| New constituency | Member of Sha Tin District Council; Representative for Chun Kam; 2000–2003 | Constituency abolished |
| Preceded by Tsang Yok-sing | Non-official Member of Executive Council; 2008–2012 | Succeeded by Starry Lee |
| Preceded by Pun Kwok-shan | Member of Sha Tin District Council; Representative for Tin Sum; 2012 | Succeeded by Pun Kwok-shan |
| Preceded by Adeline Wong | Under Secretary for Constitutional and Mainland Affairs; 2012–2015 | Succeeded by Ronald Chan |
| Preceded by Tsang Tak-sing | Secretary for Home Affairs; 2015–2020 | Succeeded by Caspar Tsui |
Legislative Council of Hong Kong
| New parliament | Member of Provisional Legislative Council; 1997–1998 | Replaced by Legislative Council |
| New parliament | Member of Legislative Council; Representative for New Territories East; 1998–2012 | Succeeded by Elizabeth Quat |
