= Wilson Shieh =

Hong Kong artist (born 1970)

Wilson Shieh Ka Ho (Chinese: 石家豪) (born 1970, Hong Kong) is a mid-career Hong Kong artist. His studio is in the Artistic Community in Fo Tan.

== Education ==
Shieh went to the King's College for secondary school. He abandoned an architecture degree at the University of Hong Kong, before graduating at the Chinese University of Hong Kong with a Bachelor of Arts in Fine Arts in 1994 and a Master of Fine Arts degree in 2001.

== Works ==
He specializes in figure painting. Shieh paints in the traditional Chinese fine-brush technique gongbi, however his works concern themselves with contemporary themes, primarily identity, dress and the body. In 1997, he was winner of the painting category in the Philippe Charriol Foundation Art Competition. Shieh emerged in the 1990s with solo shows Femme Fatales: Drawings by Shieh Ka Ho (Fringe 1995) and Fleshly - Chinese Fine-brush Paintings by Wilson Shieh (1998). More recent works include Chow Yun Fat Fitting Room in 2009. His work is part of public collections including those of the Heritage Museum and Museum of Art in Hong Kong, the National Gallery of the United States, National Taiwan Museum of Fine Arts, the Asian Art Museum of San Francisco and the Queensland Art Gallery. He was Artist Associate of the Hong Kong Sinfonietta in 2015.

In the 2010s, his work has become more subversive, making jabs at politicians like Stephen Lam Sui-lung and protesting Hong Kong's lack of autonomy.
