= List of Convenor of the Non-Official Members of the Executive Council of Hong Kong =

This is a list of Executive Council of Hong Kong non-official members convenors.

== List ==
List of Convenor of the Non-Official Members of the Executive Council of Hong Kong:

No. (Note: For the purposes of numbering, the "Number" is defined as an uninterrupted period of time in office served by one person and the "Term" is defined as a five-year term in office of the Chief Executive as stated in the Basic Law of Hong Kong.)	Portrait	Name (Birth–Death)	Term of office		Previous office	Political party (Segment)	Chief Executive	Note
1		Chung Sze-yuen	1 July 1997	30 June 1999			Tung Chee-hwa	
2		Leung Chun-ying	1 July 1999	3 October 2011			Tung Chee-hwa	
2		Leung Chun-ying	1 July 1999	3 October 2011			Donald Tsang	
3		Ronald Arculli	4 October 2011	30 June 2012			Donald Tsang	
4		Lam Woon-kwong	1 July 2012	30 June 2017			Leung Chun-ying	
5		Bernard Charnwut Chan	1 July 2017	30 June 2022			Carrie Lam	
6		Regina Ip	1 July 2022	Incumbent			John Lee	

== See also ==
- Senior Unofficial Member
