= Michael Suen =

Hong Kong politician (1944–2024)

Michael Suen Ming-yeung GBS CBE JP
- 孫明揚
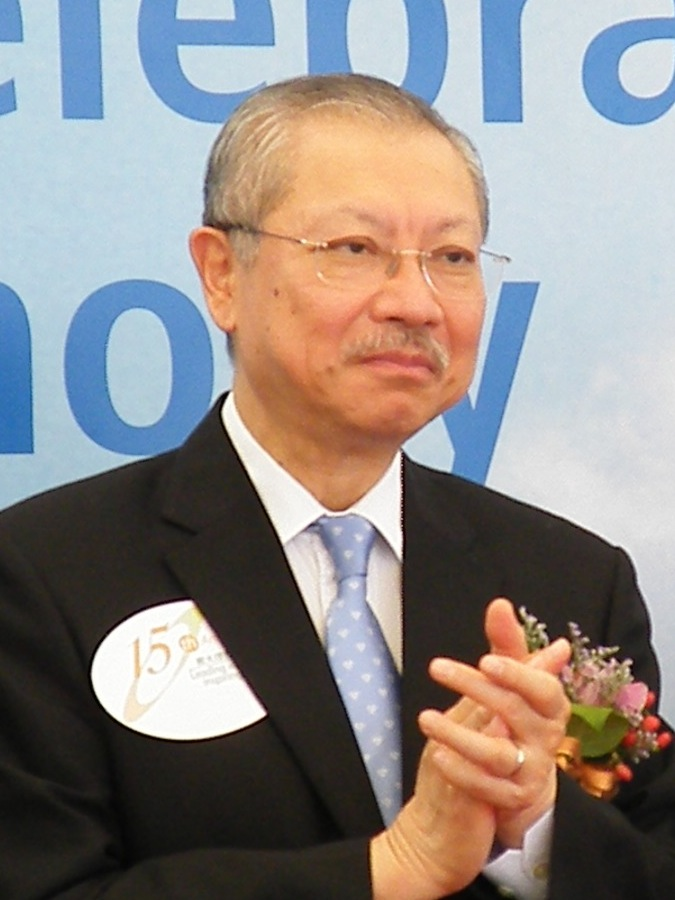
- Suen in 2008

Chief Secretary for Administration Acting
- In office 28 September 2011 – 30 September 2011
- Chief Executive: Sir Donald Tsang
- Preceded by: Henry Tang
- Succeeded by: Stephen Lam
- In office 25 May 2005 – 30 May 2005
- Chief Executive: Henry Tang (Acting); Sir Donald Tsang
- Preceded by: Sir Donald Tsang
- Succeeded by: Rafael Hui

Secretary for Constitutional Affairs
- In office 4 August 1997 – 30 June 2002
- Chief Executive: Tung Chee-hwa
- Preceded by: Nicholas Ng
- Succeeded by: Stephen Lam
- In office 1 March 1989 – 2 October 1991
- Governor: David Wilson
- Preceded by: John Chan
- Succeeded by: Michael Sze

Secretary for Home Affairs
- In office 7 November 1991 – 3 August 1997
- Governor: David Wilson; Chris Patten

Secretary for Education
- In office 1 July 2007 – 30 June 2012
- Chief Executive: Sir Donald Tsang
- Preceded by: Arthur Li (as Secretary for Education and Manpower)
- Succeeded by: Eddie Ng

Secretary for Housing, Planning and Lands
- In office 1 July 2002 – 30 June 2007
- Chief Executive: Tung Chee-hwa; Sir Donald Tsang

Personal details
- Born: 7 April 1944 Chongqing, China
- Died: 22 October 2024 (aged 80) Hong Kong

Michael Suen
- Traditional Chinese: 孫明揚
- Simplified Chinese: 孙明扬
Transcriptions
Standard Mandarin
- Hanyu Pinyin: Sūn Míngyáng
Yue: Cantonese
- Yale Romanization: Syūn Mìhng yèuhng
- Jyutping: Syun^{1} Ming^{4} joeng^{4}

Michael Suen Ming-yeung GBS CBE JP (7 April 1944 – 22 October 2024) was a Hong Kong politician who served as the acting Chief Secretary for Administration in 2005 and 2012 and as Secretary for Education of Hong Kong from 2007 to 2012.

== Early life and education ==
Suen was born in Chongqing, China on 7 April 1944. His family fled the then provisional capital to Hong Kong in 1947. He attended Wah Yan College, a Jesuit school in Hong Kong.

== Career ==
Suen joined the colonial Hong Kong Government in 1966 as an Administrative Officer and was substantively promoted to the rank of Secretary, Government Secretariat in January 1991.

During the early years of his career, he served in the former New Territories Administration, Resettlement Department and Environment Branch. He was appointed Secretary for Constitutional Affairs in March 1989 and Secretary for Home Affairs in November 1991. He continued his post as Secretary for Home Affairs on 8 July 1997 and took up the appointment as Secretary for Constitutional Affairs on 4 August 1997. Suen took up the post of Secretary for Housing, Planning and Lands on 1 July 2002.

Upon the resignation of Sir Donald Tsang on 25 May 2005, he assumed the post as the acting Chief Secretary for Administration, until Rafael Hui was appointed. In July 2007, he took over the position of Secretary for Education after Arthur Li retired.

Around 2007, he was known for pushing trilingual education with English, Cantonese and Putonghua to boost Hong Kong's competitiveness.

== Illness and death ==
On 27 April 2011, Suen announced that he was suffering from renal failure. Suen was also diagnosed with Legionnaires' disease on 21 December 2011. The new HK government headquarters found as many as 19 areas contaminated with legionella bacteria out of 43 water samples. Suen announced his recovery in January 2012.

On 22 October 2024, Suen died in Hong Kong at the age of 80.

== Controversy ==
=== 2007 protest at home ===
For years as a housing chief, Suen denied to meet with housing rights activists until 2007, when some 30 activists, including Longhair Leung Kwok-hung finally camped out at Suen's house in Happy Valley to protest. Public housing citizens were suffering from excessive rent increase, and the activists tried to voice the concern. The protest turned violent outside his home, with five policemen and one protester injured. Leung was also arrested.

=== Illegal extension case ===
In 1994, Suen purchased a new home, the low-rise Shuk Yuen building in Green Lane Happy Valley. He then illegally extended the size of his home to make it bigger. As the former Secretary for Housing, Planning and Lands, his staff reportedly warned him against the illegal extension, sending him a letter in April 2006 to remove the extension, which he reportedly ignored. In 2011, he agreed to reduce the size of the structure. Both the democratic and pro-Beijing camps criticised him.

== See also ==
- List of graduates of University of Hong Kong

Political offices
New creation	Secretary for Constitutional Affairs; 1989–1991	Succeeded by Michael Sze
Preceded by Peter Tsao	Secretary for Home Affairs; 1991–1997	Succeeded by David Lan
Preceded by Nicholas Ng	Secretary for Constitutional Affairs; 1997–2002	Succeeded by Stephen Lam
Preceded by Dominic Wong as Secretary for Housing	Secretary for Housing, Planning and Lands; 2002–2007	Succeeded by Eva Cheng as Secretary for Transport and Housing
Preceded by John Tsang as Secretary for Planning and Lands	Secretary for Housing, Planning and Lands; 2002–2007	Succeeded by Carrie Lam as Secretary for Development
Preceded by Donald Tsang	Chief Secretary for Administration; Acting; 25 May 2005 – 30 June 2005	Succeeded by Rafael Hui
Preceded by Arthur Li as Secretary for Education and Manpower	Secretary for Education; 2007–2012	Succeeded by Eddie Ng
Order of precedence
Preceded by Nellie Fong; Recipients of the Gold Bauhinia Star	Hong Kong order of precedence Recipients of the Gold Bauhinia Star	Succeeded by John B. Mortimer; Recipients of the Gold Bauhinia Star
