= Lam Woon-kwong =

Hong Kong politician and civil servant

- 林煥光
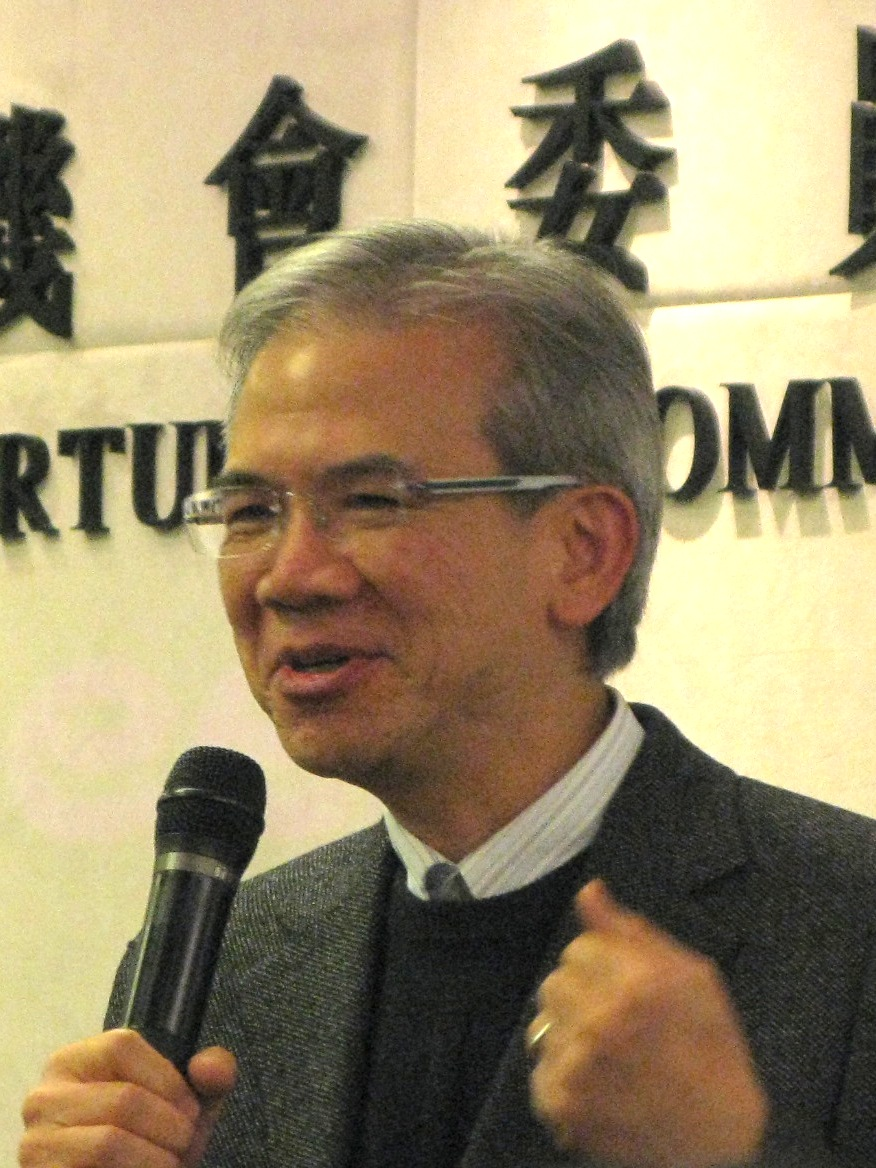

Convenor of the Non-Official Members of the Executive Council
- In office 1 July 2012 – 30 June 2017
- Chief Executive: Leung Chun-ying
- Preceded by: Ronald Arculli
- Succeeded by: Bernard Chan

Chairperson of the Equal Opportunities Commission
- In office 1 February 2010 – 31 March 2013
- Preceded by: zh:Raymond Tang
- Succeeded by: York Chow

Director of the Chief Executive's Office
- In office 1 July 2002 – 6 January 2005
- Chief Executive: Tung Chee-hwa
- Preceded by: David Lan
- Succeeded by: John Tsang

Personal details
- Born: April 19, 1951 (age 75)
- Education: zh:Wellington College; Queen's College; University of Hong Kong; Harvard University

Lam Woon-kwong
- Traditional Chinese: 林煥光
- Simplified Chinese: 林焕光
Transcriptions
Standard Mandarin
- Hanyu Pinyin: Lín Huànguāng
Yue: Cantonese
- Yale Romanization: Làhm Wuhn gwōng
- Jyutping: Lam^{4} Wun^{6} gwong^{1}

Lam Woon-kwong GBS JP (born 19 April 1951) is a Hong Kong politician and civil servant who has worked as convenor of the Executive Council and chairperson of the Equal Opportunities Commission.

== Early years ==
Lam Woon-kwong was born in 1951. He graduated from the Social Sciences Faculty of the University of Hong Kong with a Bachelor of Social Sciences in Economics and Sociology. He has two master's degrees: in Public Administration from Harvard University and in Buddhist Studies from the University of Hong Kong.

== In government ==
Lam benefited from a meteoric rise midway through his civil service career (around the time of the Handover) due to the early retirement of many of Her Majesty's Overseas Civil Service officers and the local senior civil servants expected to fill their roles. Promoted thrice between 1993 and 1996, Lam became one of many junior officers who rose swiftly through the ranks. Speaking to the Standard in 1995, even he admitted his surprise.

Lam served as Director of Education for just nine months. He was appointed Secretary for the Civil Service by Governor Patten in 1996, the first to be promoted, rather than transferred, into the role. While there, he pushed through reforms despite significant opposition from unions. He was Secretary for Home Affairs from July 2000 to June 2002.

Lam became Director of the Chief Executive's Office of the Hong Kong Special Administrative Region for Tung Chee Hwa in July 2002. In January 2005, women's magazine Sudden Weekly (Issue 493) carried a story that included photographs of Lam with a woman outside a hotel in Tokyo and an interview with his wife of nearly 30 years. Lam resigned on the same evening, saying, "in view of the media report on my private affairs, I tendered my resignation to the chief executive today".

He became Chairperson of the Equal Opportunities Commission in February 2010. In July 2012, upon his appointment as Convenor of the Executive Council for the new Chief Executive, CY Leung, despite public concern at a possible conflict of interest, he retained his position as Chairperson of the Equal Opportunities Commission. He was known for publicly disagreeing with Leung on occasion.

A HKU poll in 2016 rated him the most popular member of the Executive Council.

== Other activities ==
For the 2008 Olympic Games, he was chief executive officer of Olympic Equestrian Events (Hong Kong). He is a governor of the Hong Kong Philharmonic Society.

Lam has been a regular commentator at the South China Morning Post since 2012.

== Awards ==
- 2000: Gold Bauhinia Star
- 2005: Justice of the Peace
- 2009: Chief Executive's Commendation for Community Service Award

Political offices
Preceded by Michael Sze	Secretary for the Civil Service; 1996–2000	Succeeded by Joseph Wong
Preceded by David Lan	Secretary for Home Affairs; 2000–2002	Succeeded by Patrick Ho
Preceded by Urban Council and Regional Council	Secretary for Home Affairs; 2000–2002	Succeeded by Patrick Ho
Preceded by zh:Raymond Tang	Chairman of the Equal Opportunities Commission; 2010–2013	Succeeded by York Chow
Preceded by Ronald Arculli	Convenor of the Executive Council; 2012–2017	Succeeded by Bernard Chan
Government offices
Preceded by Dominic Wong	Director of Education; 1994–1996	Succeeded by Helen Yu
New creation	Director of the Chief Executive's Office; 2002–2005	Succeeded by John Tsang
