= B. C. K. Hawkins =

Hong Kong civil servant and government official

Brian Charles Keith Hawkins (22 August 1900 – 1962), CMG, OBE was a Hong Kong civil servant and government official. He was the Labour Officer and the Secretary for Chinese Affairs.

Hawkins joined the Hong Kong cadets and joined the Hong Kong civil service. In 1940, he was appointed Labour Officer. During the Japanese occupation of Hong Kong, Hawkins was interned at the Stanley Camp.

After the war, Hawkins joined the British Military Administration as Secretary for Chinese Affairs and Labour Officer, with J. C. McDouall as his assistant. During his services as Secretary for Chinese Affairs, Hawkins managed such issues as tenancy, domestic disputes, issuing of alcohol license, and publication. In 1946, he was awarded Officer of the Order of the British Empire (OBE) for the services in connection with the rehabilitation of the colony.

He continued his position as Labour Officer, in which the title was changed to Commissioner for Labour in 1947. In August 1947, the Chinese Engineers' Institute launched a strike where the Kowloon-Canton Railway and docks stopped running, the Hong Kong and China Gas Company closed and Dairy Farm stopped producing milk, which caused an immediate jump in food prices, after the engineers' demand of wage increase from $2 to $5 a day was rejected. Hawkins announced all disputes were settled and that basic wages would rise by 50 per cent after negotiations went on for more than a month. In 1948, the rickshaw pullers demanded for rent reduction of rickshaws, in which Hawkins mediated between the pullers and the owners and finally reached a settlement. In 1952, Hawkins was made Companion of the Order of St Michael and St George (CMG).

In 1955, he was appointed again as Secretary for Chinese Affairs. He worked in the government until he retired around 1959.

Government offices
Preceded by E. I. Wynne-Jones	Labour Officer; 1940–1941	Vacant Japanese occupation of Hong Kong
Preceded by Japanese occupation of Hong Kong	Secretary for Chinese Affairs; 1945–1946	Succeeded by Ronald Ruskin Todd
Preceded by Japanese occupation of Hong Kong	Labour Officer; 1945–1946	Succeeded by Q. A. A. Macfadyen
Preceded by Q. A. A. Macfadyen	Labour Officer; 1946–1947	Succeeded by Himself as Commissioner for Labour
Preceded by Himself as Labour Officer	Commissioner for Labour; 1947–1955	Succeeded by Ronald Ruskin Todd
Preceded by Ronald Ruskin Todd	Secretary for Chinese Affairs; 1955–1957	Succeeded by John Crichton McDouall
