= Ronald Arculli =

Hong Kong barrister, solicitor, and politician (born 1939)

The Honourable Ronald J. Arculli GBM, GBS, CVO, OBE, JP
- 夏佳理
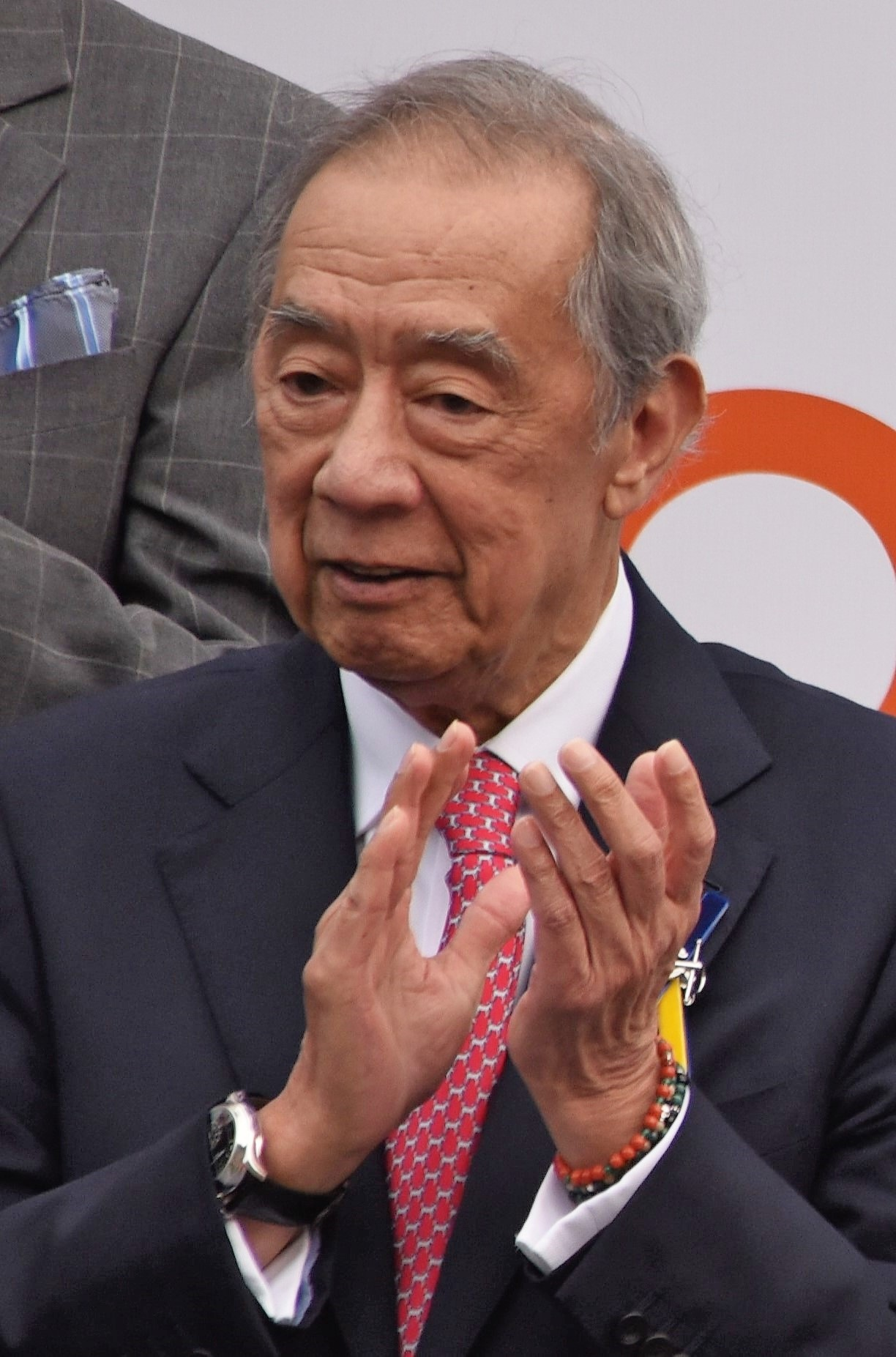
- Arculli attending the trophy presentation ceremony of the Champions Mile at the Sha Tin Racecourse on 30 April 2023

3rd Convenor of the Non-Official Members of the Executive Council
- In office 3 October 2011 – 30 June 2012
- Appointed by: Donald Tsang
- Preceded by: Leung Chun-ying
- Succeeded by: Lam Woon-kwong

Member of the Legislative Council
- In office 12 October 1988 – 22 August 1991
- Appointed by: David Wilson
- In office 9 October 1991 – 30 June 2000
- Preceded by: New constituency
- Succeeded by: Abraham Razack
- Constituency: Real Estate and Construction

Personal details
- Born: 2 January 1939 (age 87) Hong Kong
- Party: Liberal Party (1993–2000)
- Spouse: Johanna Klara
- Children: 4
- Education: St. Joseph's College; Lincoln's Inn
- Occupation: Solicitor
- Honorary Degrees: D.SocSc (CityU); LL.D (HKUST)

Ronald Joseph Arculli
- Chinese: 夏佳理
Transcriptions
Standard Mandarin
- Hanyu Pinyin: Xià Jiālǐ
Yue: Cantonese
- Yale Romanization: Haah Gāai léih
- Jyutping: Haa6 Gaai1 lei5

Ronald Joseph Arculli (Chinese: 夏佳理; born 2 January 1939 in Hong Kong) is former chairman of Hong Kong Exchanges and Clearing, Non-official Members Convenor of the Executive Council of Hong Kong (Exco) and a senior partner at King & Wood Mallesons. He is a Hong Kong solicitor and a founding partner of the law firm, Arculli, Fong, & Ng, which later merged with King & Wood Mallesons.

== Early life ==
Arculli was born to an Indian father and a Chinese mother. His parents divorced when he was three. After graduating from St Joseph's College in 1956, he was sent to study in England and finished his A-levels in 1958. After this he returned to Hong Kong and eventually became a barrister and solicitor in both the bars of Hong Kong and England.

== Career ==
Arculli was a member of the Legislative Council of Hong Kong and the deputy chairman of the Liberal Party. He is also a member of the board of directors of the Asia Art Archive and the former chairman of the Hong Kong Jockey Club. Among his current responsibilities, he is currently a senior partner with King & Wood Mallesons.

Arculli has been a non-official member of Exco since 2005 and was made Non-official Members Convenor in October 2011 following the resignation of CY Leung to stand in the 2012 Hong Kong Chief Executive election. He has also been inducted as Honorary Fellow of Hong Kong Securities and Investment Institute (HKSI) on 24 October 2013. In 2013, he was also appointed as the chairman of Richard Li Tzar-kai new venture, FWD.

== Personal life ==
Arculli speaks English and Cantonese (but cannot read or write Chinese).

With his Austrian-born wife Joanne, he has three children. He also has two children from a previous marriage, and three grandchildren. His brother-in-law (married to his sister Rhoda Arculli) is his stockbroker and the brother of Court of Final Appeal judge Kemal Bokhary. From 2002 to 2006, Arculli served as Chairman of the Hong Kong Jockey Club.

Political offices
Preceded by CY Leung	Convenor of the Executive Council; 2011–2012	Succeeded by Lam Woon-kwong
Legislative Council of Hong Kong
New constituency	Member of Legislative Council; Representative for Real Estate and Construction; 1991–1997	Replaced by Provisional Legislative Council
Preceded by Andrew Wong	Chairman of Finance Committee; 1995–2000	Succeeded by Philip Wong
New parliament	Member of Provisional Legislative Council; 1997–1998	Replaced by Legislative Council
New parliament	Member of Legislative Council; Representative for Real Estate and Construction; 1998–2000	Succeeded by Abraham Razack
Party political offices
New political party	Vice-Chairperson of the Liberal Party; 1993–2000; With: Steven Poon (1996–1998); Selina Chow (1998–2000)	Succeeded by Miriam Lau
Sporting positions
Preceded by Wong Chung-hin	Chairman of the Hong Kong Jockey Club; 2002–2006	Succeeded by John Chan
Order of precedence
Preceded by John Tsang; Recipient of the Grand Bauhinia Medal	Hong Kong order of precedence Recipient of the Grand Bauhinia Medal	Succeeded by Edward Leong; Recipient of the Grand Bauhinia Medal
