= Raymond Tam =

Hong Kong politician

The Honourable Raymond Tam Chi-yuen
- 譚志源
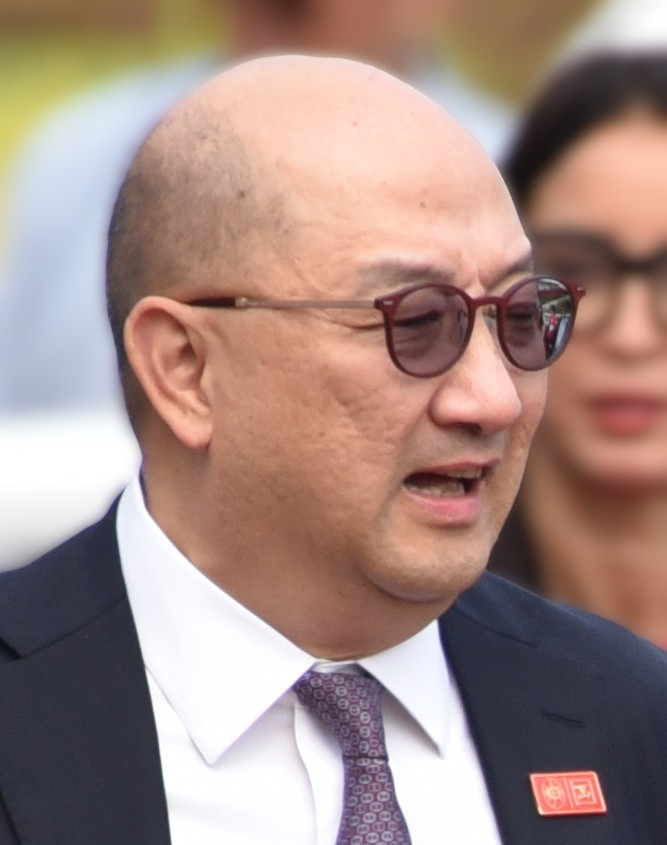
- Tam in February 2026

Secretary for Constitutional and Mainland Affairs
- In office 1 October 2011 – 1 July 2017
- Chief Executive: Donald Tsang; Leung Chun-ying
- Preceded by: Stephen Lam
- Succeeded by: Patrick Nip

Director of the Chief Executive's Office
- In office 1 August 2009 – 2011
- Chief Executive: Sir Donald Tsang
- Permanent Secretary: Elizabeth Tse; Mak Ching-yu
- Special Assistant: Ronald Chan
- Preceded by: Norman Chan
- Succeeded by: Gabriel Leung

Undersecretary of the Constitutional and Mainland Affairs Bureau
- In office 1 June 2008 – 31 July 2009
- Secretary: Stephen Lam
- Succeeded by: Adeline Wong

Personal details
- Born: 1964 (age 61–62) British Hong Kong
- Education: New Territories Heung Yee Kuk Yuen Long District Secondary School; University of Hong Kong (Bachelor of Science)

Raymond Tam
- Traditional Chinese: 譚志源
- Simplified Chinese: 谭志源
Transcriptions
Standard Mandarin
- Hanyu Pinyin: Tán Zhìyuán

Raymond Tam Chi-yuen is a Hong Kong politician.

He was one of the undersecretaries appointed by the Government of Hong Kong in 2008. He has an educational background in engineering, and has worked in various capacities in the civil service since 1987. He was appointed as the Secretary for Constitutional and Mainland Affairs in 2011.

== Education ==
Tam has a Bachelor of Science degree in engineering from the University of Hong Kong.

== Career ==
He joined the Administrative Service in September 1987, and rose to the rank of Administrative Officer Staff Grade B in April 2007. Tam has served in various bureaus and departments including the Central Policy Unit, the former Constitutional Affairs Bureau, the Office of the Financial Secretary, the Chief Executive's Office, the Hong Kong Economic and Trade Office in Geneva, Information Services Department and the Home Affairs Bureau. His meteoric rise from undersecretary (D3 rank) to the director of the Chief Executive's Office (above D8 rank) in less than two years was a rarity and radical departure from normal civil service promotion.

In December 2017, Tam became a member of National People's Congress.

Tam left the government in 2017 after 30 years in public service. In August 2018 he became executive director, corporate affairs of the Hong Kong Jockey Club.

== Undersecretary ==
In 2008 he was offered the opportunity to become an undersecretary for the constitutional and mainland affairs. He is known for renouncing his British citizenship under the 2008 Political Appointments System.

Political offices
New office	Under Secretary for Constitutional and Mainland Affairs; 2008–2009	Succeeded by Adeline Wong
Preceded by Norman Chan	Director of the Chief Executive's Office; 2009–2011	Succeeded by Gabriel Leung
Preceded by Stephen Lam	Secretary for Constitutional and Mainland Affairs; 2011–2017	Succeeded by Patrick Nip
