= Michael Sze =

Hong Kong government official (1945–2022)

Michael Sze Cho-cheung GBS, CBE, ISO, JP
- 施祖祥

Secretary for Constitutional Affairs
- In office 30 October 1991 – 27 January 1994
- Governor: Sir David Wilson; Chris Patten
- Preceded by: Michael Suen
- Succeeded by: Nicholas Ng

Secretary for the Civil Service
- In office 28 January 1994 – 1996
- Governor: Chris Patten
- Preceded by: Anson Chan
- Succeeded by: Lam Woon-kwong

Executive Director of the Trade Development Council
- In office 1996–2004
- Succeeded by: Fred Lam

Personal details
- Born: 23 June 1945 British Hong Kong
- Died: 19 May 2022 (aged 76) Hong Kong, PR China
- Education: La Salle College; University of Hong Kong

Michael Sze Cho-cheung
- Chinese: 施祖祥
Transcriptions
Standard Mandarin
- Hanyu Pinyin: Shī Zǔxiáng
Yue: Cantonese
- Jyutping: si1 zou2 coeng4

Michael Sze Cho-cheung, GBS, CBE, ISO, JP (Chinese: 施祖祥; 23 June 1945 – 19 May 2022) was a Hong Kong government official. He held various government positions including Secretary for Constitutional Affairs from 1991 to 1994 and Secretary for the Civil Service from 1994 to 1996. He was executive director of the Trade Development Council (DTC) from 1996 to 2004 and chairman of the Operations Review Committee of the Independent Commission Against Corruption (ICAC) until 2014.

== Government career ==
His ancestral home was in Dongguan, Guangdong. He moved to Hong Kong and was educated at La Salle College and the University of Hong Kong. He joined the Hong Kong government and served in various bureaux and departments, including Home Affairs Department, Chief Secretariat, Trade Department, Marine Department, and Constitutional Affairs Department. As District Officer of Kowloon in the late 1970s, he proposed giving compensation to shoppers affected by the construction of the Mass Transit Railway along Nathan Road.

He was appointed Secretary for Constitutional Affairs in 1991. During his service, he was responsible for promoting the constitutional reform package of the last Governor Chris Patten. Despite the fact Patten's constitutional reform package was strongly opposed by the Beijing government, Sze defended the package and therefore was criticised by the Beijing authorities. He was appointed Secretary for the Civil Service in 1994. At the time, expatriate civil servants' contracts were renewed automatically, which was deemed unfair to Chinese civil servants. He abolished the system and implemented the localisation of the civil service on the eve of the Handover. From 1992 to 1996, he was a member of the Executive Council of Hong Kong. He announced his retirement from the civil service in 1996, shortly before the handover.

== Later career ==
After retiring from government, Sze served as executive director of the Trade Development Council (TDC) from 1996 to 2004, the statutory organisation responsible for promoting and developing Hong Kong's external trade. During the SARS epidemic, he strengthened the sanitary measures in the July exhibition. He also abolished the pegging of TDC staff salaries with those of civil servants.

He was also chairman of the Operations Review Committee of the Independent Commission Against Corruption (ICAC). At the time many high officials were involved in corruption cases, including Chief Secretary for Administration Rafael Hui, Commissioner of the Independent Commission Against Corruption Timothy Tong and Chief Executives Donald Tsang and Leung Chun-ying. Sze assured the public that the ICAC would investigate all cases. Responding to Leung Chun-ying's comment on the ICAC not apologising to the members of Executive Council, Franklin Lam and Barry Cheung after it found no evidence in the allegations against them, Sze said that "even indiscriminate complaints are better than [the public] making no complaints." This brought criticism from another Leung ally, Executive Council member Cheung Chi-kong, who accused Sze of "encouraging" indiscriminate complaints to the ICAC and suggested that the agency would be overloaded with cases. He served on the committee until he retired in 2014, when he was replaced by Maria Tam – seen as a controversial pick by Leung Chun-ying.

Sze also held directorships of various companies, including Lee Kum Kee, Swire Pacific, Yangtzekiang Carment, and YGM Trading.

== Family and personal life ==
Sze was married to May Mok, a teacher of English, geography and religious studies at Wah Yan College. Their daughter Karen is a psychiatrist. Sze's brother, Sze Cho-sing, owns a seafood trading company.

He died on 19 May 2022, after a battle with cancer.

== Honours ==
=== National honours ===
- Hong Kong:
  - Gold Bauhinia Star (GBS)

=== Foreign honours ===
- United Kingdom:
  - Commander of the Most Excellent Order of the British Empire (CBE) (1995)
  - Companion of the Imperial Service Order (ISO) (1990)
- Japan:
  - Gold Rays with Neck Ribbon of the Order of the Rising Sun (2004)

=== Other honorary appointments ===
- Justice of the Peace

== See also ==
- 1994 Hong Kong electoral reform

Government offices
Preceded by Michael Suen	Secretary for Constitutional Affairs; 1991–1994	Succeeded by Nicholas Ng
Preceded by Anson Chan	Secretary for the Civil Service; 1994–1996	Succeeded by Lam Woon-kwong
