= David Lan (politician) =

Hong Kong government official

David Lan Hong-Tsung GBS ISO JP
- 藍鴻震

Secretary for Home Affairs
- In office 4 September 1997 – 7 July 2000
- Preceded by: Michael Suen
- Succeeded by: Lam Woon-kwong

Principal Representative, Tokyo
- In office October 1991 – September 1997
- Succeeded by: Paul Leung

Personal details
- Born: May 29, 1940 (age 86)
- Education: University of London; Harvard Business School

David Lan Hong-Tsung GBS, ISO, JP (Chinese: 藍鴻震, born 29 May 1940) is a former politician and civil servant in Hong Kong who served as the Secretary for Home Affairs from September 1997 to 7 July 2000. He is currently a National Committee Member of the Chinese People's Political Consultative Conference representing Hong Kong, serving in that post since January 2003.

David is also a businessman who currently serves as an Independent Non Executive Director of SJM Holdings Limited and Hutchison Telecommunications Hong Kong Holdings since 2008.

== Awards ==
- 2000: Gold Bauhinia Star
- 2001: Justice of the Peace

Political offices
Preceded by Michael Suen	Secretary for Home Affairs; 1997 – 2000	Succeeded by Lam Woon-kwong
