= Zandra Mok =

Zandra Mok Yee-tuen (Chinese: 莫宜端 ; born 23 August 1970) is one of the first political assistants appointed by the Government of Hong Kong in 2008. She was re-appointed as the political assistant to the Secretary for Labour and Welfare, to assume office on 13 November 2012.

== Education ==
Mok studied at Tak Nga Primary School and Heep Yunn School. She later graduate in the London School of Economics and Political Science of the University of London with a Bachelor of Science degree in International Relations, and in the School of Oriental and African Studies of the University of London with a Master of Arts degree. She is pursuing a PhD at Tsinghua University.

== Career ==
Mok joined Television Broadcasts Limited in 1995, become a reporter a year later mainly responsible for the political news, she later stationed in Beijing. In 2004, she left the TV station to join Hong Kong Research Institute as a research manager. Prior to joining the government in 2008, she was a senior manager of the Bauhinia Foundation Research Centre.

In 2008, then Chief Executive, Donald Tsang appointed Mok one of the first nine Political Assistants. Mok served as the political assistants to the Secretary for Labour and Welfare from 3 November 2008 to 30 June 2012. She was re-appointed to the same post on 31 October 2012 and assumed office on 13 November 2012.
