= Sum Lam =

- Education: Chinese University of Hong Kong (BSc) Tsinghua University (JM); King's College London (MA); University of California, Berkeley (LLM) University of Oxford (EMBA)
- Occupations: Lawyer, patent attorney

Sum Lam is a Hong Kong-based lawyer and patent attorney. He represented Warner-Lambert before China's Supreme People's Court in a patent invalidation dispute involving atorvastatin.

== Education and career ==
Lam studied chemistry at the Chinese University of Hong Kong and later law at Tsinghua University, King's College London and the University of California, Berkeley. He also received an Executive MBA from the University of Oxford. In 2004, Lam became the first person from Hong Kong to pass the Chinese patent bar examination.

Lam worked at China Patent Agent (H.K.) Ltd. and later at Squire Patton Boggs. While at China Patent Agent (H.K.) Ltd., he represented Warner-Lambert in a dispute over the validity of a patent for crystalline atorvastatin before the Supreme People's Court of China. The case concerned whether the patent sufficiently disclosed the claimed invention. The Supreme People's Court ultimately upheld the invalidation of the patent. Lam was admitted as a solicitor in England and Wales in 2018 and later qualified as a solicitor advocate. In 2019, he joined Eversheds Sutherland, where he serves as head of patents for Greater China.

In 2025, Lam became a visiting lecturer at the University of Oxford. He has written and contributed to legal works on intellectual property law, including the fourth edition of Butterworths Hong Kong Patent Law Handbook. In 2026, he co-authored Navigating AI Transformation: Business Innovation, Strategy, and Risk with Kejia Hu, Tian Wu and Jasper Shi Da Xu.
