= Samuel Turner Fearon =

Professor, interpreter and government official

Samuel Turner Fearon (c. 1819 – 18 January 1854) was the first professor of Chinese at the King's College, London. He was an interpreter in the First Opium War, and a colonial servant and senior government official in British Hong Kong.

== Early life ==
He was born in Chiswick, London in about 1819, to Christopher and Elizabeth Fearon. He was baptised in 1820 and first went to China in 1826 with his father, Christopher Fearon.

== Time in China ==
Fearon went to the Anglo-Chinese College in Malacca and, being fluent in the local tongue, became an interpreter in the First Opium War from 1839 to 1842. He was awarded the China War Medal. After the war, he went to Hong Kong and became a civil servant in the British colony. He was a clerk and interpreter of the Magistrate Court and also a public notary and coroner. He later became the first Registral General and Collector of Chinese Revenue in 1846.

== King's College ==
Fearon became the first Chinese professor at the King's College, London when the Chinese program was institutionalised at the invitation of George Thomas Staunton in 1847, despite not being a Sinologist. He did not give lectures or translate any classics or other works of Chinese language. In the end, Chinese education at the King's College failed.

== Personal life ==
Fearon died in St. Pancras, London on 18 January 1854. He married Caroline Libery in 1846 and had children Charles and Kate.

Government offices
New title	Registrar General and Collector of Chinese Revenue; 1846	Succeeded by Andrew Lysaght Inglis
