= Secretary for Constitutional and Mainland Affairs =

- 政制及內地事務局局長
- Emblem of Hong Kong

- Incumbent; Janice Tse since 30 March 2026
- Constitutional and Mainland Affairs Bureau
- Style: The Honourable
- Appointer: Central People's Government nomination by Chief Executive
- Precursor: Deputy Chief Secretary
- Inaugural holder: Michael Suen
- Formation: 1 March 1989
- Salary: HK$4,021,200 per annum
- Website: CMAB

The secretary for Constitutional and Mainland Affairs is the head of the Constitutional and Mainland Affairs Bureau in Government of Hong Kong, which is responsible for promoting the Basic Law, constitutional affairs, electoral development, and coordinate liaison between the Hong Kong government and the relevant mainland China authorities, as well as to promote various regional cooperation initiatives between Hong Kong and the mainland. Prior to 2007, this post was known as the Secretary for Constitutional Affairs.

The post was known as Deputy Chief Secretary between 1985 and 1989.

== List of office holders ==
Political party: Nonpartisan

=== Secretaries for Constitutional Affairs (憲制事務司), 1989–1997 ===
No.	Portrait	Name	Term of office		Governor	Ref
1		Michael Suen 孫明揚	1 March 1989	29 October 1991	Sir David Wilson	
2		Michael Sze 施祖祥	30 October 1991	27 January 1994	Sir David Wilson	
2		Michael Sze 施祖祥	30 October 1991	27 January 1994	Chris Patten	
3		Nicholas Ng 吳榮奎	28 January 1994	30 June 1997	Chris Patten	

=== Secretaries for Constitutional Affairs (政制事務局局長), 1997–2007 ===
No.	Portrait	Name	Term of office		Duration	Chief Executive	Ref
1		Nicholas Ng Wing-fui 吳榮奎	1 July 1997	3 August 1997	34 days	Tung Chee-hwa (I)	
2		Michael Suen Ming-yeung 孫明揚	4 August 1997	30 June 2002	4 years, 331 days	Tung Chee-hwa (I)	
3		Stephen Lam Sui-lung 林瑞麟	1 July 2002	30 June 2007	5 years, 0 days	Tung Chee-hwa (II)	
3		Stephen Lam Sui-lung 林瑞麟	1 July 2002	30 June 2007	5 years, 0 days	Donald Tsang (I)	

=== Secretaries for Constitutional and Mainland Affairs (政制及內地事務局局長), 2007–present ===
No.	Portrait	Name	Term of office		Duration	Chief Executive	Ref
1		Stephen Lam Sui-lung 林瑞麟	1 July 2007	30 September 2011	4 years, 91 days	Donald Tsang (II)	
2		Raymond Tam Chi-yuen 譚志源	30 September 2011	30 June 2017	5 years, 272 days	Donald Tsang (II)	
2		Raymond Tam Chi-yuen 譚志源	30 September 2011	30 June 2017	5 years, 272 days	Leung Chun-ying (I)	
3		Patrick Nip Tak-kuen 聶德權	1 July 2017	22 April 2020	2 years, 296 days	Carrie Lam (I)	
4		Erick Tsang Kwok-wai 曾國衞	22 April 2020	27 January 2026	5 years, 280 days	Carrie Lam (I)	
4		Erick Tsang Kwok-wai 曾國衞	22 April 2020	27 January 2026	5 years, 280 days	John Lee (I)	
5		Janice Tse Siu-wa 謝小華	30 March 2026	Incumbent	209 days	John Lee (I)	
