= Kitty Poon =

Hong Kong politician

Dr. Kitty Poon
- Born: 1964 (age 61–62); Hangzhou, Zhejiang
- Education: Rutgers University; Columbia University; Chinese University of Hong Kong
- Known for: Undersecretary of the Environment Bureau (10 July 2008 – present) former associate professor in Applied Social Science at Hong Kong Polytechnic University
- Scientific career
- Fields: Social Sciences
- Doctoral advisor: Kuan Hsin-chi

Kitty Poon Kit (Chinese: 潘潔; born 1964) is a Hong Kong politician. She was one of the undersecretaries appointed by the Government of Hong Kong in 2008.

== Personal life ==
Poon, a native of Hangzhou, Zhejiang in mainland China, immigrated to Hong Kong with her family after her middle school graduation in 1982. She moved to the United States in 1989 for further studies. There, she earned a Bachelor of Arts degree from Rutgers University and a master's degree in International Affairs from Columbia University. She naturalised as a US citizen before moving back to Hong Kong in 1997. She later completed a PhD in Government and Public Administration at the Chinese University of Hong Kong.

== Career ==
Poon joined the Hong Kong Polytechnic University in August 2005 and was promoted in 2006 to the post as an Assistant Professor of the Department of Applied Social Sciences. She is a part-time member of the Central Policy Unit and a council member of the Hong Kong Political Science Association. She is also a columnist for the South China Morning Post.

In 2008 she was nominated Undersecretary for the Environment Bureau under the 2008 Political Appointments System. She had to renounce her United States citizenship as a result of the public furore.

In 2009 Poon purchased a 3-story home in Sha Lan Villas, Tai Po. In 2011 it was discovered that it was illegally extended to a glass house on the roof and two balconies. She was ordered to take it down.

She has been a professor in the School of Public Policy and Management at Tsinghua University since 2018.

Government offices
New office	Under Secretary for the Environment; 2008–2012	Succeeded by Christine Loh
