= Information Services Department =

Hong Kong government department

- 政府新聞處

Agency overview
- Formed: 1 April 1959
- Headquarters: 2/F, 6/F-8/F, 25/F, Harbour Building, 38 Pier Road, Sheung Wan, Hong Kong
- Employees: 422 (March 2008)
- Annual budget: 370.0m HKD (2008–09)
- Agency executive: Mr Fletch Chan, Director of Information Services
- Website: isd.gov.hk

Information Services Department
- Traditional Chinese: 政府新聞處
- Simplified Chinese: 政府新闻处
Transcriptions
Standard Mandarin
- Hanyu Pinyin: Zhèngfǔxīnwénchù
Yue: Cantonese
- Yale Romanization: Jing fú sān màhn chyu
- Jyutping: Zing^{3} fu^{2} san^{1} man^{4} cyu^{3}

The Information Services Department (ISD) is the Hong Kong Government's public relations office, publisher, advertiser, and news agency, serving as the link between the government and the media. It was also commonly called Government Information Services (GIS).

== History ==
In September 1945, following the end of the Japanese occupation, the British Forces appointed a Press Relations Officer to communicate with remaining war correspondents. The unit was retitled as the Public Relations Office (PRO) when the civilian administration resumed governance of Hong Kong in 1946. The PRO was renamed as the Information Services Department (ISD) on 1 April 1959.

On 8 June 1963, ISD's headquarters moved from the fifth and sixth floors of the West Wing of the Central Government Offices to the top two floors of the new Beaconsfield House on Queen's Road Central.

In the 1970s, ISD launched new social development campaigns that are now ingrained in the collective memory of Hong Kong people. These included the Keep Hong Kong Clean Campaign, which was promoted using the iconic Lap Sap Chung litterbug character designed by ISD officer Arthur Hacker.

Following the 1995 sale of Beaconsfield House to a private developer, the Information Services Department relocated to the nearby Murray Building in 1996. Today, it is headquartered at the Harbour Building in Sheung Wan. It also once had offices in the Former French Mission Building.

In July 2022, the department rejected an Access to Information request after some media outlets were banned from covering events regarding 25th anniversary events on 1 July 2022. In response, the Ombudsman confirmed that there would be a full investigation into the matter. In January 2023, the Ombudsman agreed with the ISD, and said that revealing the method to screen journalists could aid "terrorists."

In September 2022, Fletch Chan, head of the department, was part of a team that organized of a media event with John Lee. When Hong Kong Free Press (HKFP) asked the ISD about why they could not attend, the ISD told HKFP to contact the event organizer.

In April 2023, the ISD banned several government-registered media companies from covering the 2023 National Security Education Day, which was officiated by Xia Baolong. In May 2023, the Ombudsman agreed to investigate HKFP's complaint against the ISD for banning media outlets from the event. In May 2023, the Foreign Correspondents' Club (FCC) issued a press release on the issue, stating "Media outlets being barred from covering public events raises concerns over the future of press freedom in Hong Kong, which is guaranteed under Article 27 of the Basic Law." In July 2023, the Ombudsman said it had to "refrain from making comments on the matter" as the Committee for Safeguarding National Security had banned the media.

== Organisation ==
The department is organised into four divisions:

- Local Public Relations
- Publicity and Promotions
- Public Relations Outside Hong Kong
- Administration

== Directors ==
- Mr John Lawrence Murray (1959–1963)
- Mr Nigel John Vale Watt (1963–1972)
- Mr David Robert Ford (1972–1976)
- Mr Richard Lai Ming (1976–1978)
- Mr John Desmond Slimming (1978–1979)
- Mr Bernard Renouf Johnston (acting, 1979)
- Mr Robert Strong Sun Yuan-chuang (1980–1983)
- Mr Peter Tsao Kwang-yung (1983–1984)
- Miss Cheung Man-yee (1985–1986)
- Mr John Chan Cho-chak (1986–1987)
- Mrs Irene Yau Lee Che-yun (1987–1997)
- Mr Thomas Chan Chun-yuen (1997–2002)
- Miss Yvonne Choi Ying-pik (2002–2006)
- Mr Edward Yau (2006–2007)
- Mrs Betty Fung Ching Suk-yee (2007–2009)
- Mr Michael Wong Wai-lun (2009–2014)
- Mr Patrick T K Nip (2014–2016)
- Mr Joe Wong Chi-cho (2016–2018)
- Miss Cathy Chu Man-ling (2018–2019)
- Mr Rex Chang Wai-yuen (2019– Dec 2021)
- Ms Ng Yee Mei, Grace (acting, December 2021 – July 2022)
