= Vivian Li =

Hong Kong-born cell and developmental biologist

- Education: Chinese University of Hong Kong
- Known for: Developmental biology, Organoids
- Spouse: William Berry
- Awards: Future Leaders in Cancer Research Prize, Cancer Research UK; Women in Cell Biology Early Career Medal Winner, British Society for Cell Biology; BACR/AstraZeneca Young Scientist Frank Rose Award, British Association for Cancer Research
- Scientific career
- Fields: Bowel cancer development, Organoids
- Workplaces: University of Hong Kong; Hubrecht Institute; National Institute for Medical Research; Francis Crick Institute
- Thesis: (2008)

Vivian Li is a Hong Kong-born cell and developmental biologist working in cancer research at London's Francis Crick Institute. She has been researching how stem cells in the human bowel are programmed to ensure a healthy organ and what goes wrong when cancer develops. She is known for her work on the Wnt signalling pathway, discovering a new way that a molecule called Wnt is activated in bowel cancer. She won a Future Leaders in Cancer Research Prize in part for this discovery.

== Education and early career ==
Li studied molecular biotechnology at the Chinese University of Hong Kong from 2000 to 2003, focusing on plant biotech in her final year. She then pursued a PhD in pathology at the University of Hong Kong, awarded in 2008. After her PhD, Li spent a few years working under Hans Clevers' at the Hubrecht Institute in the Netherlands.

Li became a group leader in 2013, setting up her laboratory at the MRC's National Institute for Medical Research (now part of the Francis Crick Institute). She was appointed a group leader at the Francis Crick Institute in April 2015.

== Research ==
Li's research team has used the bowel as a model to study how stem cells help maintain a healthy organ, and what goes wrong when cancer develops. She's focused her career on a particular signalling pathway that helps stem cells grow and multiply properly, called Wnt. Overactive Wnt signalling is associated with many bowel cancers by causing stem cells to divide too quickly.

Li's lab have used a variety of models, including an innovative organoid system, to reveal a new way that a molecule called Wnt is activated in bowel cancer. Li's work has offered the prospect of targeted treatment of tumour cells without toxic effects on healthy cells. This discovery was one of the reasons that she won a Future Leaders in Cancer Research Prize in 2018. Research like this could help scientists to develop more targeted treatments for bowel cancer in the future.

Li's work in growing intestinal cells in a laboratory at the Francis Crick Institute has benefited from the Institute's proximity to hospitals such as Great Ormond Street Hospital. Li was listed as a ‘scientist to watch’ in an article on the rising stars of culture, science and food in 2019 in The Observer.

Li aims to use her expertise in growing intestines in the lab to improve organ transplantation in the future. In September 2020, Li's lab revealed they had grown tissue grafts using stem cells and tissue taken from patients' intestines, publishing their findings in the journal Nature Medicine. This technique could one day be used to personalised transplants for children with intestinal failure.

== Events ==
Li was part of New Scientist's Live Talks in 2019, with a talk entitled 'Fighting cancer: How growing mini organs could create better treatment.

== Awards and honours ==
- Gold Medal Prize for PhD thesis. The prize is given to PhD candidates who have submitted work of "exceptional quality" and demonstrated excellence in other academic pursuits.
- Croucher Foundation Fellowship to study at the Hubrecht Institute
- 2018 Future Leaders in Cancer Research Prize by Cancer Research UK, awarded to individuals with potential to become international research leaders
- 2021 Women in Cell Biology Early Career Medal Winner by British Society for Cell Biology, awarded to an outstanding female cell biologist who has started her own research group within the last 6 years
- 2021 BACR/AstraZeneca Young Scientist Frank Rose Award by British Association for Cancer Research, awarded to recognise and reward the achievements of an individual whose work has made significant contributions to translational (laboratory - clinic) cancer research.
