= Lai-yung Ruby Leung =

Atmospheric scientist

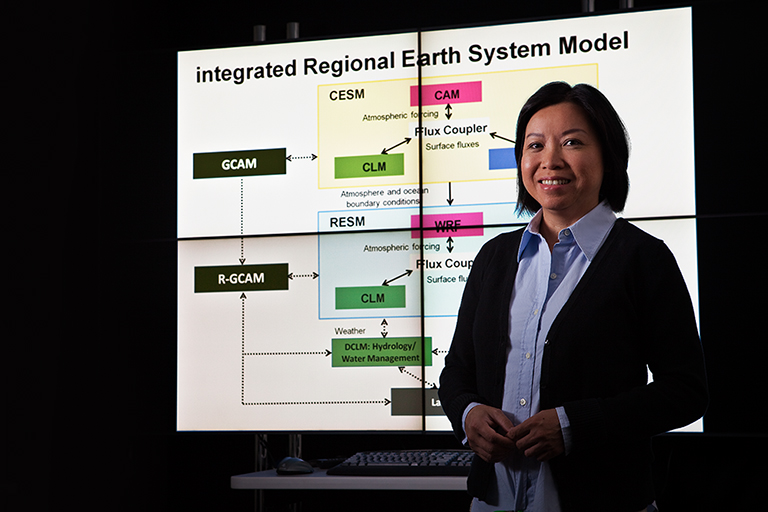
- Lai-yung Ruby Leung in 2010
- Education: Chinese University of Hong Kong (BS), Texas A&M University (MS and PhD)
- Known for: Earth Systems Analysis, Climate Modeling
- Awards: Member of National Academy of Engineering (2017); Fellow at American Geophysical Union (2015)
- Scientific career
- Fields: Climate Models, Atmospheric Science, Hydrology
- Workplaces: Pacific Northwest National Laboratory

Lai-yung Ruby Leung is an atmospheric scientist internationally recognized in the field of Earth Systems modeling and hydrologic processes. She is known for her contributions to the development of local climate models, and for her understanding of the consequences of climate change. Her interests are diverse across mountain hydrometeorology, aerosol-cloud interactions, orographic precipitation and climate extremes.

Leung was elected as a member into the National Academy of Engineering in 2017 for leadership in regional and global computer modeling of the Earth's climate and hydrological processes. In 2019, she became one of eight Battelle Fellows at the Pacific Northwest National Laboratory (PNNL).

== Education and early life ==
Leung completed her B.S. (1984) with honors in Physics and Statistics from the Chinese University of Hong Kong. She then took two years to teach at a local high school, after which she earned her M.S. (1988) and Ph.D. (1991) in Atmospheric Science from Texas A&M University. With her advisor, Gerald North, she wrote her dissertation on "Atmospheric Variability on a Zonally Symmetric Land Planet," which studied the effects of external forcing on the atmosphere. For her postgraduate degree, she co-authored a paper titled "A study of long-term climate change in a simple seasonal nonlinear climate model."

== Career and research ==
=== Pacific Northwest National Laboratory ===
Leung completed her research dissertation at PNNL in 1989 before beginning her career as a research associate in 1991. She then worked as a staff scientist and senior scientist before becoming a laboratory fellow in 2004 and a Battelle Fellow in 2017. Her current research focuses on the dynamics of various land-atmosphere interactions as well as hydrological cycles. Her team at PNNL was the first group of researchers to link soot deposition with snowpack availability in the western United States. They also found that the primary cause of intense hurricanes is a climate cycle known as the Atlantic Multidecadal Oscillation (AMO).

Along with other PNNL scientists, Leung contributed to the assessment of the Intergovernmental Panel on Climate Change (IPCC) that jointly won the Nobel Peace Prize in 2007 with Albert Arnold. As a contributing author of the report's Regional Climate Projections, she helped disseminate the knowledge on the consequences of anthropogenic activities in global warming.

=== Energy Exascale Earth System Model ===
In 2016, Leung was appointed as the chief climate scientist of the Energy Exascale Earth System Model (E3SM), previously known as the Accelerated Climate Modeling for Energy (ACME) project, by the U.S. Department of Energy (DOE). By shifting climate models from global to a regional scale, Leung and her team enhanced the efficiency of computational modeling. The model provides twice as much as details than the previous simulations and further allows for focusing on local climate effects. Leung's leadership was crucial in investigating climate change through the perspectives of various Earth System components, including hydrological and biogeochemical cycles as well as cryosphere-ocean systems. She is currently working on Phase II of the project that is expected to be completed by 2021.

=== Professional service and membership ===
Leung is an editor of the American Meteorological Society's Journal of Hydrometeorology and the American Geophysical Union's Journal of Geophysical Research-Atmosphere. She is co-chair of the Science Advisory Board Climate Working Group at the National Oceanic and Atmospheric Administration (NOAA). She is also a member of the Weather Research and Forecasting (WRF) Research Applications Board and the Biological and Environmental Research Advisory Committee (BERAC). In the past, she served on the National Academies of Sciences, Engineering, and Medicine's Board on Atmospheric Sciences and Climate (BASC) and was a member of the Science Steering Committee for the Community Earth System Models.

=== Workshops ===
As a part of BERAC, Leung organized a workshop entitled 'Second Atmospheric River Tracking Method Inter-comparison Project' where participants from the U.S. Federal Agencies, national laboratories, and U.S. and international universities attended. The workshop provided guidance on utilizing algorithms to understand the uncertainties of atmospheric river science. She has also organized several workshops and seminars sponsored by the National Aeronautics and Space Administration (NASA), DOE, NOAA and National Science Foundation (NSF).

== Awards and recognitions ==
Leung has been recognized in multiple national organizations. Her research on climate change has been featured in major news publications including Science, Popular Science, Wall Street Journal and National Public Radio among others. Some of her achievements are listed below:

- Fellow, American Geophysical Union (2015)
- Fellow, American Meteorological Society (2009)
- Fellow, American Association for the Advancement of Science (2008)
- Member, National Academy of Engineering (2017)
- Member, Washington State Academy of Sciences (2013)
- Distinguished Paper Award, International Conference on Intelligent User Interfaces, January 13–16, San Francisco, CA (2002)

== Publications ==
Leung has published over 250 peer-reviewed journal articles. Her most cited articles include research on climate modeling and the effects of climate change.
