= Secretary for Home and Youth Affairs =

Hong Kong governmental position

Hong Kong Special Administrative Region Secretary for Home Affairs 民政及青年事務局局長
- Emblem of Hong Kong

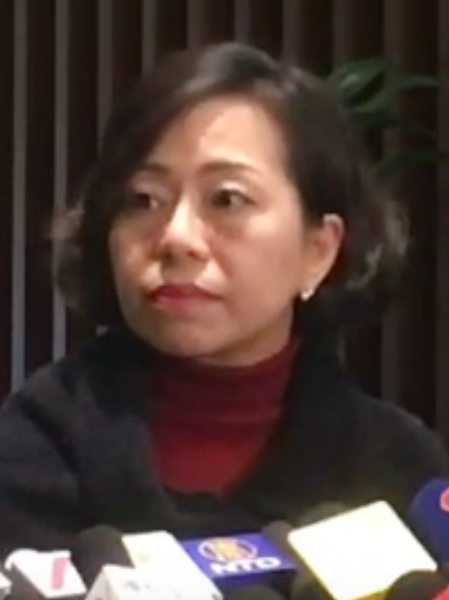
- Incumbent; Alice Mak since 1 July 2022
- Home and Youth Affairs Bureau
- Style: The Honourable
- Appointer: State Council of China nomination by Chief Executive
- Inaugural holder: Michael Suen
- Formation: 1 July 1997
- Salary: HK$4,021,200 per annum
- Website: HAB

Secretary for Home and Youth Affairs
- Traditional Chinese: 民政及青年事務局局長
Transcriptions
Yue: Cantonese
- Yale Romanization: Màhn jing sih mouh guhk guhk jéung
- Jyutping: Man^{4} zing^{3} si^{6} mou^{6} guk^{6} guk^{6} zoeng^{2}

The Secretary for Home and Youth Affairs is the head of the Home and Youth Affairs Bureau of the Government of Hong Kong, which is responsible for local issues, and the provision of community and youth services.

== List of office holders ==
=== Registrars General, 1845–1912 ===
No.	Portrait	Name	Term of office		Governor	Ref
1		Samuel Turner Fearon	1845	1845	Sir John Francis Davis (1844–1848)	
2		Andrew Lysaght Inglis	16 July 1845	1849	Sir John Francis Davis (1844–1848)	
2		Andrew Lysaght Inglis	16 July 1845	1849	Sir George Bonham (1848–1854)	
3		William Thomas Mercer 馬撒爾	1 June 1849	1850	Sir George Bonham (1848–1854)	
4		Charles May	1850	1856	Sir George Bonham (1848–1854)	
4		Charles May	1850	1856	Sir John Bowring (1854–1859)	
5		Daniel Richard Caldwell	15 November 1856	1862	Sir John Bowring (1854–1859)	
5		Daniel Richard Caldwell	15 November 1856	1862	Sir Hercules Robinson (1859–1865)	
6		Thomas Turner	23 May 1862	October 1864	Sir Hercules Robinson (1859–1865)	
7		Sir Cecil Clementi Smith	24 October 1864	1881	Sir Hercules Robinson (1859–1865)	
7		Sir Cecil Clementi Smith	24 October 1864	1881	Sir Richard Graves MacDonnell (1866–1872)	
7		Sir Cecil Clementi Smith	24 October 1864	1881	Sir Arthur Kennedy (1872–1877)	
7		Sir Cecil Clementi Smith	24 October 1864	1881	Sir John Pope Hennessy (1877–1882)	
8		Sir James Russell 羅素	14 May 1881	1883	Sir John Pope Hennessy (1877–1882)	
8		Sir James Russell 羅素	14 May 1881	1883	Sir George Bowen (1883–1885)	
9		Frederick Stewart 史超域	2 April 1883	1887	Sir George Bowen (1883–1885)	
10		James Stewart Lockhart 駱克	10 October 1887	1901	Sir William Des Voeux (1887–1891)	
10		James Stewart Lockhart 駱克	10 October 1887	1901	Sir William Robinson (1891–1898)	
10		James Stewart Lockhart 駱克	10 October 1887	1901	Sir Henry Arthur Blake (1898–1903)	
11		Arthur Winbolt Brewin 蒲魯賢	15 March 1901	1912	Sir Henry Arthur Blake (1898–1903)	
11		Arthur Winbolt Brewin 蒲魯賢	15 March 1901	1912	Sir Matthew Nathan (1904–1907)	
11		Arthur Winbolt Brewin 蒲魯賢	15 March 1901	1912	Sir Frederick Lugard (1907–1912)	

=== Secretaries for Chinese Affairs, 1913–1941 ===
No.	Portrait	Name	Term of office		Governor	Ref
1		Edwin Richard Hallifax 夏理德	25 July 1913	30 November 1933	Sir Francis Henry May (1912–1918)	
1		Edwin Richard Hallifax 夏理德	25 July 1913	30 November 1933	Sir Reginald Edward Stubbs (1919–1925)	
1		Edwin Richard Hallifax 夏理德	25 July 1913	30 November 1933	Sir Cecil Clementi (1925–1930)	
1		Edwin Richard Hallifax 夏理德	25 July 1913	30 November 1933	Sir William Peel (1930–1935)	
2		Alan Eustace Wood 活雅倫	30 November 1933	24 October 1934	Sir William Peel (1930–1935)	
3		Norman Lockhart Smith 史美	24 October 1934	20 October 1936	Sir William Peel (1930–1935)	
3		Norman Lockhart Smith 史美	24 October 1934	20 October 1936	Sir Andrew Caldecott (1935–1937)	
4		Roland Arthur Charles North 那魯麟	20 October 1936	25 December 1941	Sir Andrew Caldecott (1935–1937)	
4		Roland Arthur Charles North 那魯麟	20 October 1936	25 December 1941	Sir Geoffry Northcote (1937–1941)	
4		Roland Arthur Charles North 那魯麟	20 October 1936	25 December 1941	Mark Aitchison Young (1941)	

=== Secretaries for Chinese Affairs, 1946–1969 ===
No.	Portrait	Name	Term of office		Governor	Ref
5		Brian Charles Keith Hawkins 鶴健士	1945	1946	Military administration	
6		Ronald Ruskin Todd 杜德	1 May 1946	10 March 1955	Sir Mark Aitchison Young (1946–1947)	
6		Ronald Ruskin Todd 杜德	1 May 1946	10 March 1955	Sir Alexander Grantham (1947–1957)	
5		Brian Charles Keith Hawkins 鶴健士	11 March 1955	11 May 1957	Sir Alexander Grantham (1947–1957)	
7		John Crichton McDouall 麥道軻	12 May 1957	1 November 1966	Sir Alexander Grantham (1947–1957)	
7		John Crichton McDouall 麥道軻	12 May 1957	1 November 1966	Sir Robert Brown Black (1958–1964)	
7		John Crichton McDouall 麥道軻	12 May 1957	1 November 1966	Sir David Trench (1964–1971)	
8		David Ronald Holmes 何禮文	2 November 1966	27 February 1969	Sir David Trench (1964–1971)	

=== Secretaries for Home Affairs, 1969–1985 ===
No.	Portrait	Name	Term of office		Governor	Ref
1		David Ronald Holmes 何禮文	28 February 1969	17 May 1971	Sir David Trench (1964–1971)	
2		Donald Luddington 陸鼎堂	18 May 1971	2 June 1973	Sir David Trench (1964–1971)	
2		Donald Luddington 陸鼎堂	18 May 1971	2 June 1973	Sir Murray MacLehose (1971–1982)	
3		Jack Cater 姬達	3 June 1973	14 November 1973	Sir Murray MacLehose (1971–1982)	
4		Denis Bray 黎敦義	15 November 1973	4 May 1977	Sir Murray MacLehose (1971–1982)	
5		Li Fook-kow 李福逑	8 June 1977 (Note: Acting since 5 May 1977.)	31 August 1980	Sir Murray MacLehose (1971–1982)	
6		Denis Bray 黎敦義	1 September 1980	31 December 1984	Sir Murray MacLehose (1971–1982)	
6		Denis Bray 黎敦義	1 September 1980	31 December 1984	Sir Edward Youde (1982–1986)	
7		Peter Tsao 曹廣榮	1 January 1985	31 March 1985	Sir Edward Youde (1982–1986)	

Home affairs were handled by Secretaries for District Administration between 1985 and 1989.

=== Secretaries for Home Affairs, 1989–1997 ===
No.	Portrait	Name	Term of office		Governor	Ref
1		Donald Liao 廖本懷	1 September 1989	30 November 1991	Sir David Wilson (1987–1992)	
2		Peter Tsao 曹廣榮	1 December 1989	6 November 1991	Sir David Wilson (1987–1992)	
3		Michael Suen 孫明揚	7 November 1991	30 June 1997	Sir David Wilson (1987–1992)	
3		Michael Suen 孫明揚	7 November 1991	30 June 1997	Chris Patten (1992–1997)	

=== Secretaries for Home Affairs, 1997–2022 ===
Political party: Nonpartisan Democratic Alliance for the Betterment and Progress of Hong Kong (DAB)

No.	Portrait	Name	Term of office		Duration	Chief Executive	Term	Ref
1		Michael Suen Ming-yeung 孫明揚	8 July 1997	3 August 1997	26 days	Tung Chee-hwa (1997–2005)	1	
2		David Lan Hong-tsung 藍鴻震	4 September 1997	6 July 2000	2 years, 306 days	Tung Chee-hwa (1997–2005)	1	
3		Lam Woon-kwong 林煥光	10 July 2000	30 June 2002	1 year, 356 days	Tung Chee-hwa (1997–2005)	1	
3		Lam Woon-kwong 林煥光	10 July 2000	30 June 2002	1 year, 356 days	Tung Chee-hwa (1997–2005)	2	
4		Patrick Ho Chi-ping 何志平	1 July 2002	30 June 2007	5 years, 0 days	Tung Chee-hwa (1997–2005)	2	
4		Patrick Ho Chi-ping 何志平	1 July 2002	30 June 2007	5 years, 0 days	Donald Tsang (2005–2012)	2	
5		Tsang Tak-sing 曾德成	1 July 2007	21 July 2015	8 years, 20 days	Donald Tsang (2005–2012)	3	
5		Tsang Tak-sing 曾德成	1 July 2007	21 July 2015	8 years, 20 days	Leung Chun-ying (2012–2017)	4	
6		Lau Kong-wah 劉江華	21 July 2015	22 April 2020	4 years, 276 days	Leung Chun-ying (2012–2017)	4	
6		Lau Kong-wah 劉江華	21 July 2015	22 April 2020	4 years, 276 days	Carrie Lam (2017–2022)	5	
7		Caspar Tsui Ying-wai 徐英偉	22 April 2020	24 February 2022	1 year, 308 days	Carrie Lam (2017–2022)	5	

=== Secretaries for Home and Youth Affairs, since 2022 ===
Political party: Nonpartisan Hong Kong Federation of Trade Unions (HKFTU)

No.	Portrait	Name	Term of office		Duration	Chief Executive	Term	Ref
1		Alice Mak Mei-kuen 麥美娟	1 July 2022	Incumbent	4 years, 68 days	John Lee (2022–present)	6	
