= Florence Hui =

Florence Hui Hiu-fai, SBS (Chinese: 許曉暉; 6 July 1974 – 3 December 2018) was one of the undersecretaries appointed by the Government of Hong Kong. She served as the Undersecretary for Home Affairs from 2008 to 2017.

== Education ==
Hui held a Bachelor degree in business administration from the Chinese University of Hong Kong and an MBA from Cambridge University. She undertook executive training programmes at Tsing Hua University and Harvard University.

== Career ==
Hui joined the Standard Chartered Bank in 2002 and was promoted in 2007 to Head of Business Planning and Development for Northeast Asia. She was the Secretary to the Hong Kong Association of Banks and served on the Hong Kong General Chamber of Commerce Financial Services Committee. She was a convenor of the Chamber’s China Committee. She was also a part-time member of the Central Policy Unit.

== Undersecretary ==
In 2008 she was made an undersecretary for the Home Affairs Bureau under the Political Appointments System. She left the office in 2017.

== Later life and death ==
Hui was appointed to the board of Hong Kong Palace Museum Limited in March 2018. On 3 December 2018, Hui died of breast cancer at the age of 44.

Government offices
New office	Undersecretary for Home Affairs; 2008–2017	Succeeded by Jack Chan
