= Stephen Lam =

Former Chief Secretary of Hong Kong

The Honourable Stephen Lam Sui-lung GBM GBS OBE
- 林瑞麟
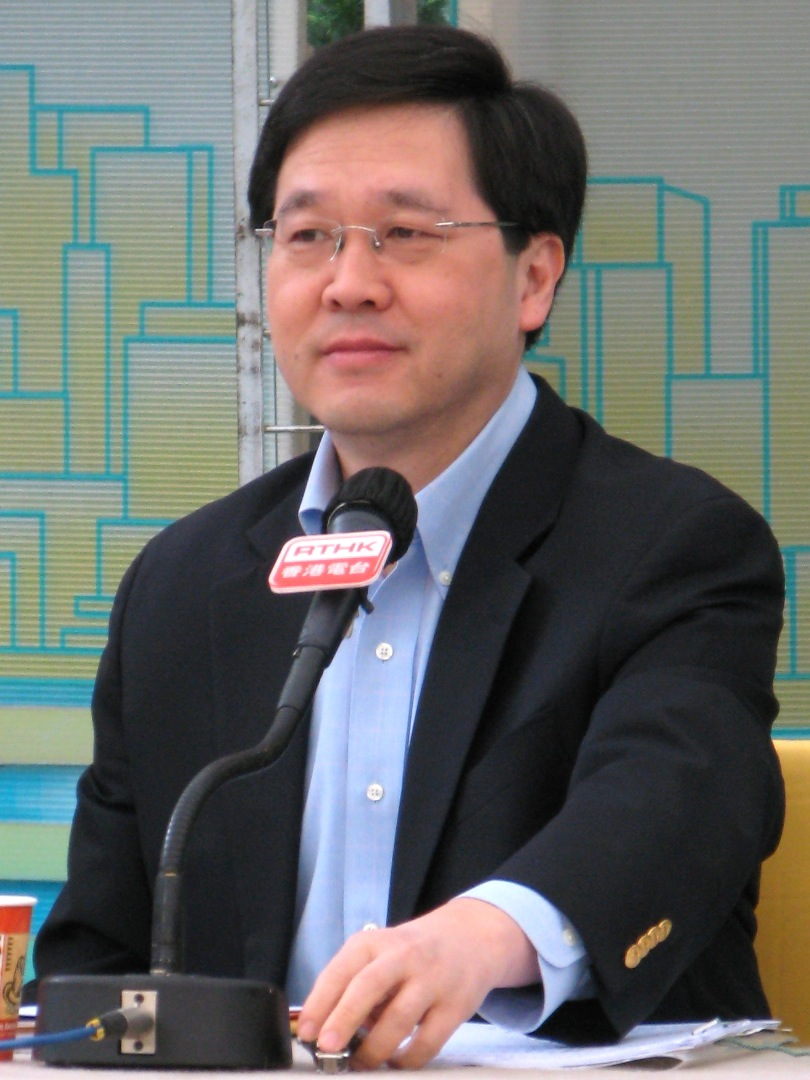
- Stephen Lam in 2010

Chief Secretary for Administration
- In office 30 September 2011 – 30 June 2012
- Chief Executive: Donald Tsang
- Preceded by: Henry Tang
- Succeeded by: Carrie Lam

Secretary for Constitutional and Mainland Affairs
- In office 1 July 2002 – 30 September 2011
- Chief Executive: Tung Chee Hwa; Donald Tsang
- Preceded by: Michael Suen (as Secretary for Constitutional Affairs)
- Succeeded by: Raymond Tam

Personal details
- Born: 24 November 1955 (age 70) Hong Kong
- Spouse: Florence Ip Mo-fee (m. 1979)
- Education: University of Hong Kong (BSS); University of London (LLB); University of Oxford (PGDip)

Stephen Lam Sui-lung
- Chinese: 林瑞麟
- Cantonese Yale: Làhm Seuih-lèuhn
Transcriptions
Standard Mandarin
- Hanyu Pinyin: Lín Ruìlín
- Bopomofo: ㄌㄧㄣˊ ㄖㄨㄟˋ ㄌㄧㄣˊ
- Gwoyeu Romatzyh: Lin Rueylin
- IPA: [lǐn ɻwêɪ.lǐn]
Yue: Cantonese
- Yale Romanization: Làhm Seuih-lèuhn
- Jyutping: Lam4 Seoi6leon4
- IPA: [lɐm˩ sɵɥ˨.lɵn˩]

Stephen Lam Sui-lung GBM GBS OBE (Cantonese pronunciation: [lɐm˩ sɵɥ˨.lɵn˩]; born 24 November 1955) was the Chief Secretary for Administration of Hong Kong and Secretary for Constitutional and Mainland Affairs.

Lam was born in Hong Kong attended Wah Yan College. He graduated from the University of Hong Kong in 1978 and then began his public service career. During his early years in the civil service he attended the University of London Law School, from which he graduated in 1983.

== Career ==
Lam joined the Hong Kong government administrative service in October 1978. He held senior positions as Administrative Assistant to the Chief Secretary from 1989 to 1991. He was the Deputy Secretary for Constitutional Affairs from 1994 to 1996. He was the director of the Hong Kong Handover Ceremony Co-ordination Office from 1996 to 1997. In this role he was appointed an Officer of the Order of the British Empire in the Queen's Birthday Honours of 1997.

After the transfer of sovereignty over Hong Kong to the People's Republic of China, he was the Director of Administration and Development in the Hong Kong Department of Justice. From July 2002 to September 2011 he was Secretary for Constitutional Affairs. Lam then replaced Henry Tang as the Chief Secretary for Administration, with nine months of the term remaining, due to Tang's resignation from the post in advance of his expected trot to the Chief Executiveship. Lam has enjoyed the lowest popularity ratings among the three key secretaries – chief secretary, finance secretary and justice secretary – and in May 2012 scored 37.3 points out of 100.

On 5 and 6 June 2009, Lam met with Fu Don-cheng (傅棟成), Taiwan's Mainland Affairs Council deputy minister. The meeting took place in Taipei to improve cooperation between Hong Kong and Taiwan trade. He also met with Lai Shin-yuan, the Chairwoman of the MAC.

Lam decided to leave politics upon the expiry of his term of office on 30 June 2012; He became the official with lowest opinion poll since HK SAR Government was established in 1997. After the end of his term, he went to the University of Oxford to study theology and graduated after one year.

== Criticism ==
In July 2007 during a Legislative Council meeting, Lam was criticized by the pan-democrats for pocketing millions of dollars in government salary, while making no progress in constitutional development. Lam was dubbed “Eunuch Lam” (林公公) and “human recorder” (人肉錄音機). In 2011, his alleged "manipulation" of political development – in particular, the so-called "replacement mechanism" for filling vacancies in the Legislative Council caused by resignations, led to objections to his promotion to Chief Secretary, including a protest march of more than a thousand people, led by the Civil Human Rights Front.

Political offices
Preceded by Michael Suen	Secretary for Constitutional Affairs; 2002–2007	Succeeded by Himself as Secretary for Constitutional and Mainland Affairs
Preceded by Himself as Secretary for Constitutional Affairs	Secretary for Constitutional and Mainland Affairs; 2007–2011	Succeeded by Raymond Tam
Preceded by Henry Tang	Chief Secretary for Administration; 2011–2012	Succeeded by Carrie Lam
Government offices
New office	Information Coordinator of Chief Executive Office; 1999–2002	Vacant Title next held by Andy Ho
Order of precedence
Previous: Geoffrey Ma; Recipient of the Grand Bauhinia Medal	Hong Kong order of precedence Recipient of the Grand Bauhinia Medal	Succeeded by Wong Yan-lung; Recipient of the Grand Bauhinia Medal
