= Peter Tsao =

Peter Tsao Kwang-yung, CBE (1989) (Chinese: 曹廣榮; born 7 October 1933, Shanghai – died 5 June 2005, Thailand) was a career civil servant of Hong Kong.

== Life and career ==
Tsao was Secretary for Administrative Services and Information (行政司) and Secretary for Home Affairs (政務司) of colonial Hong Kong Government from 1985 to 1991. He was the primary ethnic Chinese individual to be in a secretary-level position during frontier organization. He was described as "Bad Boy Tsao" in headlines in 1986 when he was posted to Brussels as representative for Hong Kong trade relations with the European Union.

In 1950, he emigrated to Hong Kong where he was educated at St. Joseph's College, Hong Kong. In 1955 he began working at the Royal Observatory as computing officer (grade III). He later worked as hygiene officer at the government and graduated from National College of Food Technology in London in 1960 and has a Diploma in Food Hygiene from the Royal Society of Health, London. He further worked as assistant trade officer until his retirement in 1991. In 2005, he died in Thailand, aged 71.

== Later positions ==
- 1979 – Director of Trade, Industry and Customs
- 1981 – Director of Industry
- 1983 – Director of Information Services
- 1986 – Representative to Brussels
- 1986 – Secretary for Administrative Services and Information
- 1990 – Secretary for Home Affairs (4th ranked)

Political offices
Preceded by Li Fook Kow	Secretary for Home Affairs; 1990–1991	Succeeded by Michael Suen
