= 1970s Hong Kong student protests =

Hong Kong political movement

During the 1970s in Hong Kong, university campuses experienced a period of heated political discussion and debate, referred to as the "fiery era" (Chinese: 火紅年代; lit. 'Flaming Red Era'). The political imagination was strongly shaped by the global New Left movement that emerged from the late 1960s.

In this period, university students — mainly from the Chinese University of Hong Kong and the University of Hong Kong — could be divided into three major factions according to their political stances: the Maoist faction, the social action faction, and the Trotskyist and anarchist faction. Many activists in those student protests later became key figures in Hong Kong's political, journalistic or cultural sectors.

== Background ==
=== New Left influences ===
Globally, the 1960s to 1970s were an active period of leftist movements that redefined the political landscape. Movements such as the United States' Civil rights movement (1955–68) and Anti-Vietnam War protests (1964–75) challenged systemic racism and imperialist wars. France's May 1968 protests, Germany's 1968 protests, Japan's Anpo protests (1959–60), university struggles (1968–69), and the emergence of radical groups like the Japanese Red Army (1969–72) all reflected a broader questioning of traditional authority, capitalism, and colonialism. Events like the Prague Spring (1968) in Czechoslovakia and the Tlatelolco massacre (1968) in Mexico further fueled international solidarity among student and leftist groups. These developments collectively inspired Hong Kong students, who began to engage in critical discussions about colonialism, democracy, and social justice, mirroring trends seen worldwide. This unprecedented wave of student movements and leftist activism earned the period the nickname "the global sixties," particularly the year 1968 became a symbol representing the left-wing activism and what would be known as "New Left." The youth leading the movements emphasis on "liberation" and "consciousness-raising," often replaced older Marxist priorities centered on party construction and social transformation.

=== China's Cultural Revolution ===
Another major influence on Hong Kong's student movements was China's Cultural Revolution (1966–76). Initiated by Mao Zedong, the Cultural Revolution aimed to purge capitalist, traditional, and "counter-revolutionary" elements from Chinese society through mass mobilization, particularly of youth and workers. Although Hong Kong remained a British colony, revolutionary fervor from across the border inspired segments of Hong Kong's leftist organizations, culminating in the 1967 Hong Kong riots.

The 1967 riots, sparked by labor disputes and inspired by Maoist ideology, quickly escalated into violent confrontations, bombings, and widespread fear. The riots deeply shocked Hong Kong society. Public sympathy for leftist causes rapidly declined as the violence alienated ordinary citizens. Many Hongkongers came to view mainland China's chaos as a cautionary tale, accelerating the rise of localism — a political identity focused on Hong Kong's distinct society and interests, separate from Communist China. Among university students, the riots triggered a realignment: while some remained loyal to Maoist ideals, others shifted toward social activism rooted in local issues or embraced Trotskyist and anarchist critiques of authoritarianism.

The Cultural Revolution's decline also influenced Hong Kong's political atmosphere. Following Mao Zedong's death in 1976, a power struggle ensued within the Chinese Communist Party. The radical Gang of Four — Jiang Qing (Mao's widow), Zhang Chunqiao, Yao Wenyuan, and Wang Hongwen — who had been key architects of the Cultural Revolution's excesses, were arrested and blamed for the turmoil of the previous decade. Their fall symbolized the official end of the Cultural Revolution. In mainland China, the subsequent leadership under Deng Xiaoping would move toward economic reform and political stabilization.

For Hong Kong students, the downfall of the Gang of Four and Mao's death further discredited radical Maoist ideals. It accelerated a broader disillusionment with Communist revolutionary models and reinforced the search for alternative paths for political and social change. Some students doubled down on local social struggles, focusing on grassroots activism, human rights, and social justice within Hong Kong itself rather than looking to ideological blueprints from the mainland.

=== Political reform ===
The 1970s also saw significant political changes within Hong Kong itself. After the 1967 riots, the colonial government, recognizing the need to rebuild trust, launched efforts to strengthen communication with the public. The introduction of district officers (民政主任) was a major step toward creating a bridge between the government and local communities. Key figures such as Elizabeth Wong, Helen Yu Lai Ching-ping, and Lily Yam joined the civil service in this period, reflecting the government's strategy of recruiting more local talent. Sir Jack Cater, a senior civil servant, played a crucial role in reforming the civil service, notably by founding the Independent Commission Against Corruption (ICAC) after public outrage over the escape of corrupt police superintendent Peter Godber. Students, including members of the Chinese University of Hong Kong's student union, were at the forefront of organizing mass rallies demanding anti-corruption measures. The establishment of the ICAC marked a critical turning point in Hong Kong's governance, strengthening the government's legitimacy and demonstrating the potential impact of activism. Scholars like Ambrose King later noted that had the government failed to respond effectively, it could have suffered a serious crisis of authority and legitimacy.

== Factions ==
=== Maoist faction ===
The Maoists, also called the "pro-China faction" (國粹派), initially retained their dominance in the universities and youth movements. In December 1971, the Hong Kong University Students' Union (HKUSU) organised its first visit into mainland China. In the next few years, the student activists undertook further tours into mainland China, ran Chinese study groups, and organised the so-called "Chinese Weeks", to carry out their mission of educating Hong Kong students about the achievements of China's socialist government.

In April 1976, the death of Premier Zhou Enlai triggered a large-scale demonstration at the Tiananmen Square in Beijing which was suppressed by the orthodox Gang of Four. The Maoist-dominated Hong Kong Federation of Students (HKFS) passed a resolution titled "Counterattack the Right-Deviationist Reversal-of-Verdicts Trend" on 3 May 1976, condemning the Tiananmen protesters as "anti-socialists" and "subversives".

However, the resolution faced stiff opposition from the Trotskyists, who issued a statement in a left-wing periodical titled October Review, condemning the Chinese Communist Party and calling for an uprising of the Chinese workers and peasants to topple the CCP's regime. By the end of 1976, the death of Mao Zedong which was followed by the arrest and downfall of the Gang of Four severely demoralised the Maoists in Hong Kong and damaged their formerly unshakeably idealistic belief in Marxist–Leninist socialism. The official verdict of the Tiananmen Incident was also reversed after Deng Xiaoping came to power in 1978, as it would later be officially hailed as a display of pro-Beijing patriotism, which further diminished the prestige of the Maoists, eventually wiping out their influence from Hong Kong's left-wing movements.

=== Social action faction ===
In the universities, the Maoist-dominated student unions faced challenges from the non-Maoist leftists, who were more critical of the Chinese Communist Party and criticised the blind-eyed ultranationalist sentiments of the Maoists. Instead, they focused more on the injustices in Hong Kong's colonial capitalist system and helped emancipate the indigent and underprivileged members of the community. The social action faction (社會派) was influenced by the doctrines and ideals of the New Left, which was emerging in the West during the 1960s and 1970s, and was introduced to Hong Kong by Tsang Shu-ki, editor of the Socialist Review and Sensibility, two left-wing Hong Kong periodicals published in that time. The social action faction actively participated in the 1970s non-aligned social movements, such as the Chinese Language Movement, the anti-corruption movement, the "Defend the Diaoyu Islands" movement et al., in which many of the student leaders became the main figureheads and leaders of the contemporary pro-democracy camp.

The Yaumatei resettlement movement was one of the movements that attempted to pressure the colonial government into resettling the boat people located in the Yaumatei typhoon shelter into affordable public housing in 1971–72 and again in 1978–79. The social activists founded their own organisation with several Maryknolls and the staffs of the Hong Kong Christian Industrial Committee (HKCIC), which was called the Society for Community Organisation (SoCO) in 1971. Moreover, the social workers who felt constrained by the pro-government Hong Kong Social Workers' Association founded the Hong Kong Social Workers' General Union (HKSWGU) in 1980.

=== Trotskyists and anarchists ===
The Revolutionary Communist Party of China, which was founded in September 1948 by Chinese Trotskyists and led by Peng Shuzhi on the basis of the Communist League of China fled to Hong Kong after the Chinese Communist Party's takeover of China in 1949. The party has legally been active and has been publishing the October Review periodical in Hong Kong since 1974.

New Trotskyist and anarchist factions (自由派) emerged from a student movement that broke out at the Chu Hai College in 1969. The students were disillusioned with the Communist Party in the aftermath of events such as the Cultural Revolution and the Lin Bao Incident, which heavily discredited the CCP.

In 1972, several members of Hong Kong's youth made an expensive trip to Paris to meet with exiled Chinese Trotskyists including Peng Shuzhi. Several of the returnees such as John Shum and Ng Chung-yin left the 70's Biweekly, which was at the time dominated by anarchists, and established a Trotskyist youth group called the Revolutionary International League, after meeting with Peng Shuzhi in Paris. It later took the name "Socialist League", and soon after changed its name into the Revolutionary Marxist League, which became the Chinese section of the Fourth International in 1975. Members of the group include Leung Kwok-hung, who formed the April Fifth Action after the league was disbanded in 1990, and Leung Yiu-chung of the Neighbourhood and Worker's Service Centre, who both became members of the Legislative Council in the 1990s and 2000s.

== Leading figures ==
Maoists:

- David Chan
- Ching Cheong
- Choy So-yuk
- Chung Shui-ming
- Lau Nai-keung
- Antony Leung
- Ma Lik
- Ng Ching-fai
- Yeung Yiu-chung

Social actionists:

- Anthony Cheung
- Cheung Man-kwong
- Frederick Fung
- Tsang Shu-ki
- Yeung Sum

Trotskyists and anarchists:

- Albert Ho
- Mak Hoi-wah
- Leung Kwok-hung
- Leung Yiu-chung
- Ng Chung-yin
- John Shum
