= 2000 Hong Kong legislative election in New Territories East =

- 10 September 2000

All 5 New Territories East seats to the Legislative Council
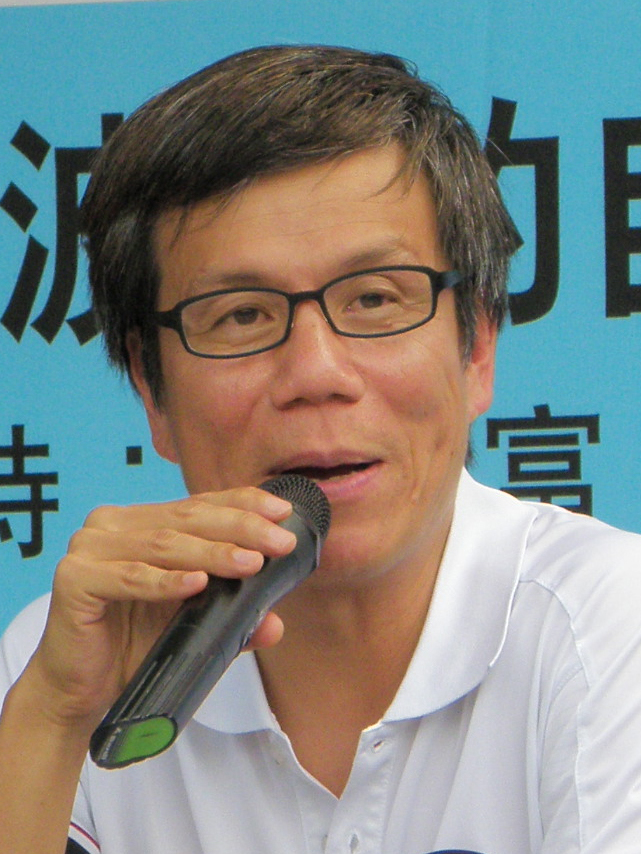

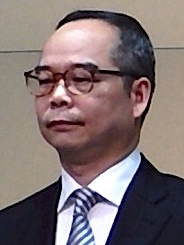

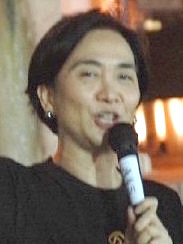
	First party	Second party
Leader	Andrew Cheng	Lau Kong-wah
Party	Democratic	DAB
Alliance	Pro-democracy	Pro-Beijing
Last election	2 seats, 25.6%	1 seats, 17.2%
Seats before	1	1
Seats won	2	1
Seat change	▲1	Steady
Popular vote	75,213	66,943
Percentage	24.4%	21.8%
Swing	▼1.2%	▲4.6%
	Third party	Fourth party
Leader	Emily Lau	Andrew Wong
Party	Frontier	Independent
Alliance	Pro-democracy	Pro-democracy
Last election	2 seats, 30.8%	1 seat, 13.4%
Seats before	2	1
Seats won	1	1
Seat change	▼1	Steady
Popular vote	63,541	44,899
Percentage	20.6%	14.6%
Swing	▼10.2%	▲1.2%

These are the New Territories East results of the 2000 Hong Kong legislative election. The election was held on 10 September 2000 and all 5 seats in New Territories East where consisted of North District, Tai Po District, Sai Kung District and Sha Tin District were contested. The Democratic Party gained one new seat with Wong Sing-chi, as Cyd Ho of The Frontier ran in Hong Kong Island.

== Overall results ==
Before election:

↓
4	1
Pro-democracy	Pro-Beijing

Change in composition:

↓
4	1
Pro-democracy	Pro-Beijing

Party	Seats	Seats change	Contesting list(s)	Votes	%	% change
Democratic	2	+1	2	75,213	24.4	–1.2
Frontier	1	–1	1	63,541	20.6	–10.2
April Fifth Action	0	0	1	18,235	5.9	N/A
Independent	1	0	1	44,899	14.6	N/A
Pro-democracy camp	4	0	5	201,888	65.6	–5.0
DAB	1	0	1	66,943	21.8	+4.6
Liberal	0	0	1	15,450	5.0	–5.2
HKPA	0	0	1	8,835	2.9	N/A
New Forum	0	0	1	6,774	2.2	N/A
Independent	0	0	1	7,945	2.6	N/A
Pro-Beijing camp	1	0	5	105,947	34.4	+5.0
Turnout:				307,835	44.8	

== Candidates list ==
Legislative Election 2000: New Territories East
List	Candidates	Votes	Of total (%)	± from prev.
DAB	Lau Kong-wah Wan Yuet-kau, Wong Mo-tai, Wan Chung-ping, Li Kwok-ying	66,943	21.75 (20+1.75)	+4.58
Frontier	Emily Lau Wai-hing Richard Tsoi Yiu-cheong	63,541	20.64 (20+0.64)	−10.17
Democratic	Andrew Cheng Kar-foo Gary Fan Kwok-wai, Shirley Ho Suk-ping, Leung Wing-hung, Kwan Wing-yip	49,242	16.00	N/A
Nonpartisan	Andrew Wong Wang-fat	44,899	14.59	+1.16
Democratic	Wong Sing-chi Chow Wai-tung, Wong Leung-hi	25,971	8.44	N/A
April Fifth Action	Leung Kwok-hung	18,235	5.92	N/A
Liberal	Lau Hing-kee, Leung Chi-wai, Susana Ho Shu-tee	15,450	5.02	−5.23
HKPA	Choy Kan-pui, Ling Man-hoi, Cheng Chun-wo, Ho Sau-mo	8,835	2.87	N/A
Nonpartisan	Brian Kan Ping-chee	7,945	2.58	+0.57
New Forum	Law Cheung-kwok	6,774	2.20	N/A
Total valid votes		307,835	100.00	
Rejected ballots		2,112		
Turnout		309,947	44.78	–11.1
Registered electors		692,164		

== See also ==
- Legislative Council of Hong Kong
- Hong Kong legislative elections
- 2000 Hong Kong legislative election
