= 2004 Hong Kong legislative election in New Territories East =

- 12 September 2004

All 7 New Territories East seats to the Legislative Council
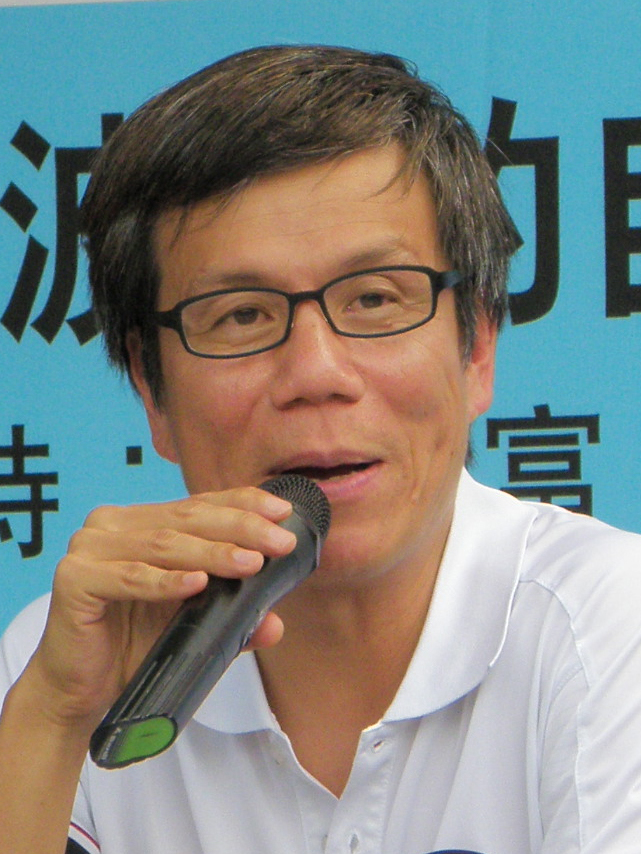

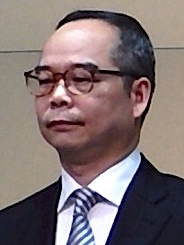

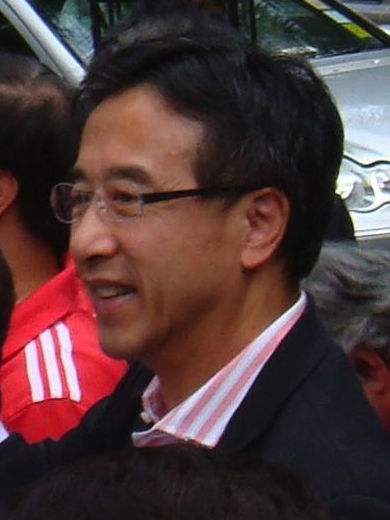

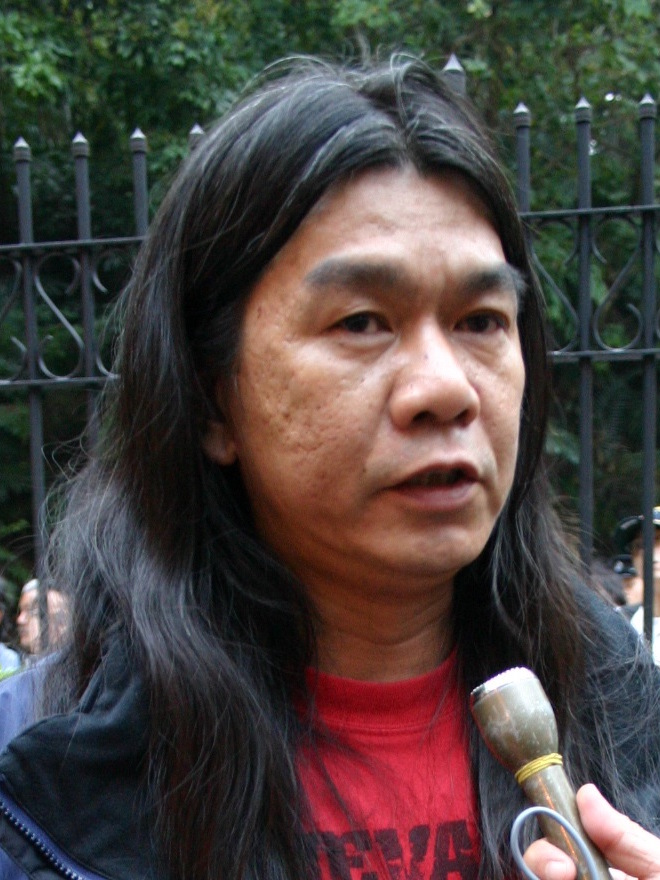
	First party	Second party
Leader	Andrew Cheng	Lau Kong-wah
Party	7.1 United Front	DAB
Alliance	Pro-democracy	Pro-Beijing
Last election	New alliance	1 seats, 21.6%
Seats before	3	1
Seats won	3	2
Seat change	Steady	▲1
Popular vote	168,833	95,434
Percentage	39.2%	22.1%
Swing	N/A	▲0.4%
	Third party	Fourth party
Leader	James Tien	Leung Kwok-hung
Party	Liberal	April Fifth Action
Alliance	Pro-Beijing	Pro-democracy
Last election	0 seat, 5.0%	0 seat, 5.9%
Seats before	0	0
Seats won	1	1
Seat change	▲1	▲1
Popular vote	68,560	60,925
Percentage	15.9%	14.1%
Swing	▲10.9%	▲8.2%
- Party with most votes in each District Council Constituency.

These are the New Territories East results of the 2004 Hong Kong legislative election. The election was held on 12 September 2004 and all 7 seats in New Territories East where consisted of North District, Tai Po District, Sai Kung District and Sha Tin District were contested. The pro-democracy camp formed an electoral coalition "7.1 United Front" aimed at four seats, however due to the largest remainder method the wasted votes contributed to Li Kwok-ying who placed second on the Democratic Alliance for the Betterment of Hong Kong ticket. Radical democrat Leung Kwok-hung of April Fifth Action also won a seat for the first time.

== Overall results ==
Before election:

↓
4	1
Pro-democracy	Pro-Beijing

Change in composition:

↓
4	3
Pro-democracy	Pro-Beijing

Party	Seats	Seats change	Contesting list(s)	Votes	%	% change
7.1 United Front	3	0	1	168,833	39.2	N/A
April Fifth Action	1	+1	1	60,925	14.1	+8.2
Independent	0	–1	1	23,081	5.4	–10.6
Pro-democracy camp	4	0	3	252,839	58.7	–6.9
DAB	2	+1	1	95,434	22.1	+0.4
Liberal	1	+1	1	68,560	15.9	+10.9
HKPA	0	0	1	14,174	3.3	+0.4
Pro-Beijing camp	3	+2	3	178,168	41.3	+6.9
Turnout:				431,007	56.4	

== Candidates list ==
Legislative Election 2004: New Territories East
List	Candidates	Votes	Of total (%)	± from prev.
7.1 United Front	Andrew Cheng Kar-foo, Emily Lau Wai-hing, Ronny Tong Ka-wah Wong Sing-chi, Richard Tsoi Yiu-cheong, Shirley Ho Suk-ping, Ricky Or Yiu-lam	168,833	39.17 (14.29+14.29+10.59)	N/A
DAB	Lau Kong-wah, Li Kwok-ying Mok Kam-kwai, Chan Kwok-tai, So Sai-chi, Wong Pik-kiu, Chan Hak-kan	95,434	22.14 (14.29+7.85)	+0.39
Liberal	James Tien Pei-chun	68,560	15.91	+10.89
April Fifth Action	Leung Kwok-hung	60,925	14.14	+8.22
Nonpartisan	Andrew Wong Wang-fat	23,081	5.36	−10.64
HKPA	Tso Wung-wai	14,174	3.29	+0.42
Total valid votes		431,007	100.00	
Rejected ballots		3,745		
Turnout		434,752	56.42	+11.64
Registered electors		770,590		

== See also ==
- Legislative Council of Hong Kong
- Hong Kong legislative elections
- 2004 Hong Kong legislative election
