= Tang Tao =

Chinese mathematician

- 汤涛

President of United International College
- In office February 2019 – April 2024
- Preceded by: Ng Ching-fai
- Succeeded by: Chen Zhi

Personal details
- Born: May 1963 (age 63) Shucheng County, Anhui, China
- Children: 3
- Education: Peking University; University of Leeds
- Scientific career
- Fields: Computational mathematics
- Workplaces: Chinese Academy of Sciences

Tang Tao (simplified Chinese: 汤涛; traditional Chinese: 湯濤; pinyin: Tāng Tāo; born May 1963) is a Chinese mathematician who previously served as President of BNU-HKBU United International College. Tang is a member of the Chinese Academy of Sciences, Fellow of the European Academy of Sciences, Fellow of The World Academy of Sciences for the advancement of science in developing countries (TWAS). He is also a fellow of the Society for Industrial and Applied Mathematics and American Mathematical Society.

== Biography ==
Tang was born in May 1963 in Shucheng County, Anhui to a military family. He secondary studied at Beijing No. 9 High School. He completed his bachelor's degree in mathematics in 1984 from Peking University and earned his doctor's degree in mathematics from the University of Leeds in 1989. After graduation, he taught at Simon Fraser University and then obtained tenure there. In 1998, he moved to Hong Kong Baptist University, and became chair professor in 2003. He was Head of Department of Mathematics during 2005–2008, Director of Graduate School of the university from 2002 to 2011, Associate Vice-president of the university since 2009, and dean of science from 2011 to 2015. In May 2015, he was hired by the Southern University of Science and Technology as its vice-president. He was appointed Provost and VP Academic in May 2018.

Tang served one term as President of the East Asia SIAM Section. From 2008 to 2012, he served as the President of the Hong Kong Mathematical Society. Tang was the co-founding editor of a Chinese journal titled "Mathematical Culture", which offers lively, readable, and appealing exposition on a wide range of mathematical topics in four issues each year. Tang was also one of the authors for this journal, publishing several articles including Feng Kang's story and Yitang Zhang's story.

In November 2017, he was elected as an academician of the Chinese Academy of Sciences.

In February 2019, he was appointed as the President of BNU-HKBU UIC. His successor is Chen Zhi.

== Personal life ==
Tang has two sons and one daughter.

== Selected works ==
- Feng, Xinlong; Tang, Tao; Yang, Jiang (2015). "Long Time Numerical Simulations for Phase-Field Problems Using p-Adaptive Spectral Deferred Correction Methods". SIAM Journal on Scientific Computing. 37 (1): A271–A294. Bibcode:2015SJSC...37A.271F. doi:10.1137/130928662. S2CID 27848431.
- Tang, Tao; Zhou, Tao (2014). "On discrete least square projection in unbounded domain with random evaluations and its application to parametric uncertainty quantification". SIAM Journal on Scientific Computing. 36 (5): A2272–A2295. arXiv:1403.6579. Bibcode:2014SJSC...36A2272T. doi:10.1137/140961894. S2CID 34127075.
- Qiao, Zhonghua; Zhang, Zhengru; Tang, Tao (2011). "An Adaptive Time-Stepping Strategy for the Molecular Beam Epitaxy Models". SIAM Journal on Scientific Computing. 33 (3): 1395–1414. Bibcode:2011SJSC...33.1395Q. doi:10.1137/100812781.
- Chen, Yanping; Tang, Tao (2010). "Convergence analysis of the Jacobi spectral-collocation methods for Volterra integral equations with a weakly singular kernel". Mathematics of Computation. 79 (269): 147. Bibcode:2010MaCom..79..147C. doi:10.1090/S0025-5718-09-02269-8.
- Xu, Chuanju; Tang, Tao (2006). "Stability Analysis of Large Time-Stepping Methods for Epitaxial Growth Models". SIAM Journal on Numerical Analysis. 44 (4): 1759–1779. doi:10.1137/050628143.
- Ma, Heping; Sun, Weiwei; Tang, Tao (2005). "Hermite Spectral Methods with a Time-Dependent Scaling for Parabolic Equations in Unbounded Domains". SIAM Journal on Numerical Analysis. 43: 58–75. doi:10.1137/S0036142903421278. hdl:2031/71777520-3662-4b59-80e3-ab426cf39263.
- Tang, Huazhong; Tang, Tao (2003). "Adaptive Mesh Methods for One- and Two-Dimensional Hyperbolic Conservation Laws". SIAM Journal on Numerical Analysis. 41 (2): 487–515. doi:10.1137/S003614290138437X.
- Li, Ruo; Liu, Wenbin; Ma, Heping; Tang, Tao (2002). "Adaptive Finite Element Approximation for Distributed Elliptic Optimal Control Problems". SIAM Journal on Control and Optimization. 41 (5): 1321–1349. doi:10.1137/S0363012901389342.
- Li, Ruo; Tang, Tao; Zhang, Pingwen (2001). "Moving Mesh Methods in Multiple Dimensions Based on Harmonic Maps". Journal of Computational Physics. 170 (2): 562–588. Bibcode:2001JCoPh.170..562L. doi:10.1006/jcph.2001.6749.
- Tang, Tao; Trummer, Manfred R. (1996). "Boundary Layer Resolving Pseudospectral Methods for Singular Perturbation Problems". SIAM Journal on Scientific Computing. 17 (2): 430–438. Bibcode:1996SJSC...17..430T. doi:10.1137/S1064827592234120.
- Li, Ming; Tang, Tao (2001). "A Compact Fourth-Order Finite Difference Scheme for Unsteady Viscous Incompressible Flows". Journal of Scientific Computing. 16: 29–45. doi:10.1023/A:1011146429794. S2CID 1283463.
- Tang, Tao; Teng, Zhen-Huan (1995). "The Sharpness of Kuznetsov's $O(\sqrt \Delta x)L^1$-Error Estimate for Monotone Difference Schemes". Mathematics of Computation. 64 (210): 581–589. doi:10.1090/S0025-5718-1995-1270625-9. JSTOR 2153440.
- Tang, Tao (1993). "The Hermite Spectral Method for Gaussian-Type Functions". SIAM Journal on Scientific Computing. 14 (3): 594–606. Bibcode:1993SJSC...14..594T. doi:10.1137/0914038.

== Awards ==
- Leslie Fox Prize for numerical analysis, 1988
- Feng Kang Prize for Scientific Computing, 2003
- Fellow, Society for Industrial and Applied Mathematics (SIAM), 2012
- State Natural Science Award, China, 2016
- Fellow of the American Mathematical Society, 2017
- Member, Chinese Academy of Sciences
- Invited speaker, International Congress of Mathematicians, 2018

Educational offices
New title	Dean of Graduate School and Vice-President of Southern University of Science and Technology; 2015–2018	Succeeded by Teng Jinguang
Preceded by Wu Chuanyue (吴传跃)	Director of Education and Vice-President of Southern University of Science and Technology; 2018–2019	Succeeded by Zhang Dongxiao (张东晓)
Preceded by Ng Ching-fai	President of United International College; 2019	Incumbent
