= Chen Zhi =

Chen Zhi may refer to:

- Chen Zhi (Three Kingdoms) (陳祗) (died 258), official of the Shu Han state during the Three Kingdoms period of China
- Chen Zhi (guitarist) (陈志), Chinese guitarist
- Chen Zhi (sinologist) (陈致), Chinese scholar
- Chen Zhi (businessman) (陈志), the founder of Cambodian conglomerate Prince Group
