= Lee Yue-shun =

Hong Kong social worker (born 1993)

- 李予信
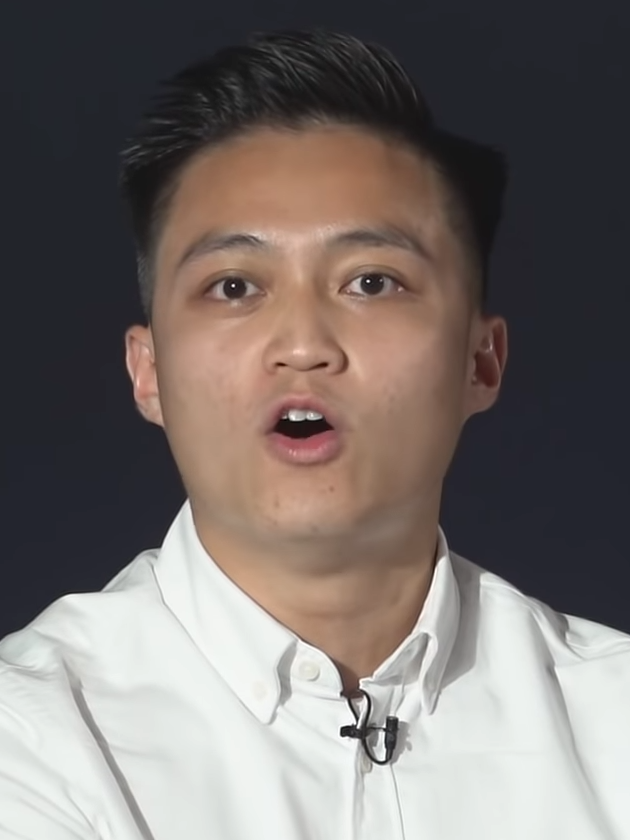
- Lee in 2020

Eastern District Councillor
- In office 1 January 2020 – 1 September 2021
- Preceded by: Choy So-yuk
- Constituency: Kam Ping

Personal details
- Born: 18 August 1993 (age 33)
- Party: Civic Party (until 2021)
- Education: Chinese University of Hong Kong (BSW)
- Occupation: Social worker
- Website: Lee Yue-shun on Facebook

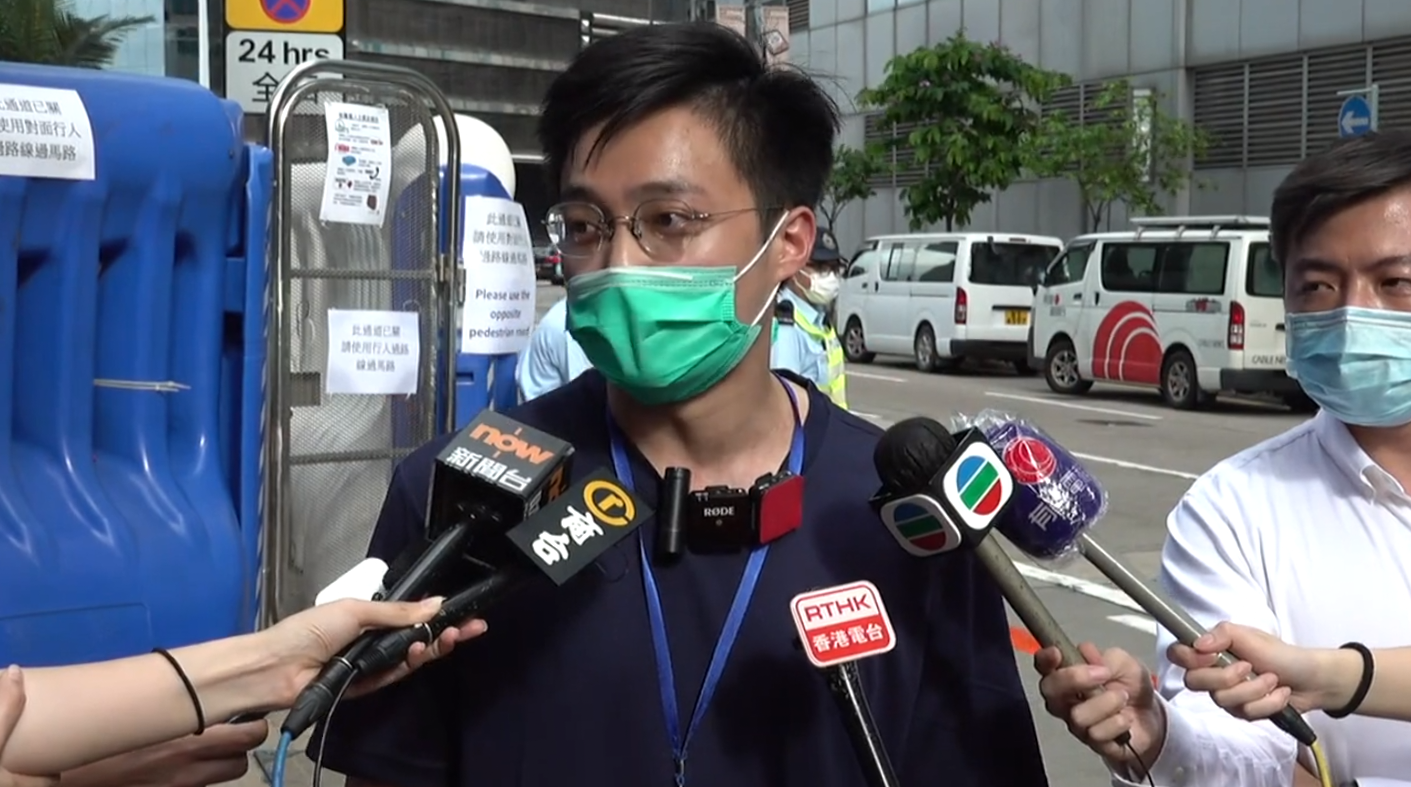
Lee in June 2020 after arrest

Lee Yue-shun (Chinese: 李予信) is a Hong Kong social worker and former District Councillor. Formerly a member of the pro-democracy Civic Party, Lee was arrested and charged in 2021 for subversion along with other Hong Kong 47 defendants.

== Early career ==
Lee studied in the Chinese University of Hong Kong and obtained a Bachelor of Social Work, wishing to serve at-risk youths. He later became a registered social worker.

== Political career ==
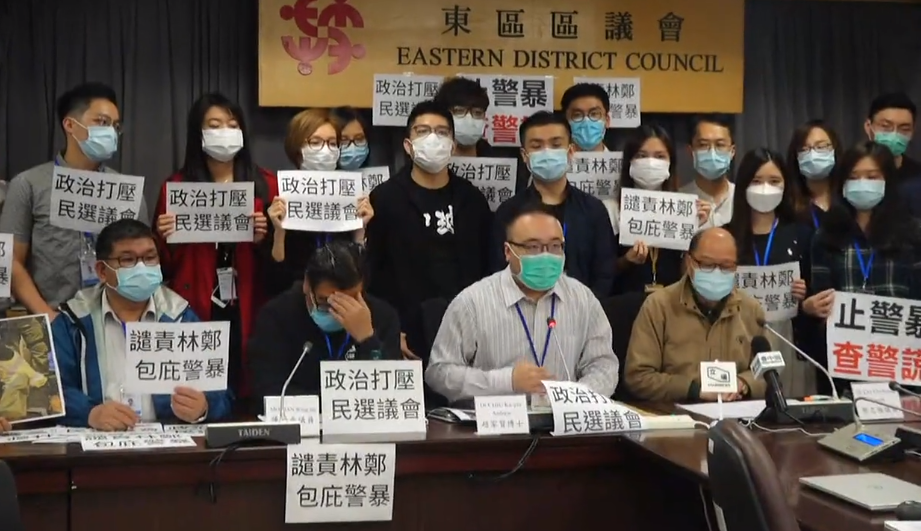
Lee during an Eastern District Council meeting in March 2020

During the 2016 legislative election, Lee campaigned for the Civic Party of the pro-democracy bloc, and also helped Tat Cheng in North Point, a heavily pro-China neighbourhood on the Hong Kong Island, who would be elected as the first Civic District Councillor serving the region.

In the 2019 Hong Kong local elections, Lee became the first democrat in the Kam Ping constituency of District Council after defeating pro-Beijing candidate supported by retiring veteran Choy So-yuk.

A year later he joined the pro-democracy primaries, hoping to secure nomination for the camp to run in District Council (Second) constituency, but was defeated by other candidates. He was arrested and charged in February 2021 for subversion over his participation in the primaries. Unlike majority of the Hong Kong 47, Lee was granted bail by court after considering him for having served the community as district councillor and co-operated with various government departments. On 30 May 2024, Lee was one of two defendants who were acquitted, the other being Lawrence Lau, because the court found that he had not mentioned an intention to use veto power to force the government to agree to the protesters' demands.

He quit the Civic Party on 2 March 2021 along with three other party seniors who were also accused of subversion and deleted his social media accounts. The four also made a public call for dissolving the Civic Party, saying it has already completed its historic mission. Lee resigned from the District Council on 1 September 2021.
