= Revolutionary Marxist League (Hong Kong) =

Revolutionary Marxist League 革命馬克思主義者同盟
- Founder: Ng Chung-yin
- Founded: March 1975
- Dissolved: 1991
- Ideology: Marxism; Trotskyism
- Political position: Far-left
- Regional affiliation: Pro-democracy camp
- International affiliation: Fourth International

The Revolutionary Marxist League was a Trotskyist vanguard party that existed in Hong Kong from 1975 to 1991.

== History ==
The League was founded in the background of the political changes in the early 1970s when the Cultural Revolution and Lin Biao Incident heavily discredited the Chinese Communist Party, as well as the emergence of the social movements in Hong Kong at the same time.

After a student movement broke out at the Chu Hai College in 1969, the student activists published a periodical called Seventies Biweekly which became the platform of the radical youths. Until in 1972, few of the Hong Kong youths made an expensive trip to Paris to meet with the exiled Chinese Trotskyists. Few of the returnees such as John Shum and Ng Chung-yin left the Seventies Biweekly dominated by anarchists, and established a Trotskyist youth group called Revolutionary International League. It later took the name Socialist League and changed its name into Revolutionary Marxist League in 1975.

The league published periodicals such as Combat Bulletin and aligned themselves with the International Majority Tendency of the United Secretariat. In 1975 it became the Chinese section of the Fourth International, together with another long-existing Trotskyist group the Revolutionary Communist Party.

The well-known Legislative Council member since 2004, "Longhair" Leung Kwok-hung was an active member of the league. After the league was disbanded in 1991, he became active member of another socialist group called April Fifth Action.

== See also ==
- April Fifth Action
- League of Social Democrats
