= Beijing Normal–Hong Kong Baptist University =

Public college in Zhuhai, Guangdong, China

Coordinates: 22.35312591442095°N 113.51608149064025°E

- 北师香港浸会大学
- Former name: Beijing Normal University–Hong Kong Baptist University United International College (2005–2025)
- Motto: 博文雅志，真知笃行
- Motto in English: In knowledge and in deeds, unto the whole person
- Type: Public
- Established: 2005; 21 years ago
- Chairman: Chen Zhi
- President: Chen Zhi
- Provost: Patrick Chau
- Location: 2000 Jintong Rd, Zhuhai, Guangdong, China
- Website: www.bnbu.edu.cn; www.bnbu.edu.cn/en

Chinese name
- Simplified Chinese: 北师香港浸会大学
- Traditional Chinese: 北師香港浸會大學
Transcriptions
Standard Mandarin
- Hanyu Pinyin: Běi Shī-Xiānggǎng Jìnhuì Dàxué

The Beijing Normal–Hong Kong Baptist University (BNBU) is a public university in Zhuhai, Guangdong, China. Established in 2005 by Beijing Normal University and Hong Kong Baptist University, it is the first full-scale cooperative university between mainland China and Hong Kong. It is approved by the Ministry of Education of China under the national Sino-foreign cooperative education framework.

In March 2025, following approval by the Ministry of Education, the institution was renamed "Beijing Normal–Hong Kong Baptist University" (BNBU). Situated in Zhuhai within the Guangdong–Hong Kong–Macao Greater Bay Area, BNBU uses English as the medium of instruction and offers programmes from bachelor's to post-doctoral level. It comprises seven faculties and schools alongside a graduate school and enrolls over 10,000 students.

== Faculties and schools ==
BNBU offers a range of programmes from bachelor's degrees to post-doctoral studies and comprises seven faculties and schools. It also provides taught and research postgraduate programmes.

- Faculty of Business and Management
  - Department of Accounting
  - Department of Finance and Economics
  - Department of Management
- Faculty of Humanities and Social Sciences
  - Department of Communication
  - Department of Languages and Cultures
  - Department of Social Sciences
- Faculty of Science and Technology
  - Department of Mathematical Sciences
  - Department of Statistics and Data Science
  - Department of Computer Science
  - Department of Life Sciences
- School of Culture and Creativity
  - Department of Culture, Creativity and Design
  - Department of Film, Television and New Media
  - Department of Music
- School of AI and Liberal Arts
  - Computational Media+N
  - Digital Global Communication+N
  - Intelligent Business Leadership+N
  - Math+N
  - Intelligent Science and Technology+N
- School of General Education
  - Chinese Language and Culture Centre
  - Centre for Foreign Languages
  - Whole Person Education Centre
- Graduate School

== Research ==
BNBU hosts the Institute for Advanced Study. The university also operates postdoctoral programmes in Mathematics, Statistics, and Journalism and Communication, and runs provincial key laboratories, including the Guangdong Provincial Key Laboratory of Interdisciplinary Research and Application for Data Science and the Guangdong Key Laboratory for Artificial Intelligence and Multi-Modal Data Processing.

== Culture transmission ==
BNBU has launched English-taught bachelor's, master's, and doctoral programmes in Chinese Culture and Global Communication. Its traditional Chinese courses teach yayue, guqin, Chinese archery and more.

== Campus ==
BNBU is located in Tangjiawan, Xiangzhou, Zhuhai, adjacent to the historic Huitong ancient village (around 300 years old), forming an integrated "university town" layout.
