= Tsang Shu-ki =

Hong Kong economist and social activist

Tsang Shu-ki (Chinese: 曾澍基; 15 April 1950 – 16 August 2014) was a Hong Kong economist and social activist. He was the founding member of the Meeting Point, a political organisation in the 1980s and was the influential thinker among the student and social activists during the time.

== Biography ==
Tsang was born in Hong Kong in 1950. He was influenced by translation works by Franz Kafka and Karl Marx in his young and studied philosophy and political science at the University of Hong Kong and was vice-chairman of the Hong Kong University Students' Union. He was one of the leader of student movements against the colonial injustice during the 1970s and was one of the organisers of the anti-corruption campaign at that time. He was the editor of Socialist Review and Sensibility, two left wing journals during that time which introduced the student activists New Left, existentialist and Frankfurt School theories.

He later obtained a Master of Business Administration degree from the Chinese University of Hong Kong and worked as a credit analyst, a gold and foreign exchange dealer, and a treasury assistant. He later rejoined the academia, studying his Doctoral degree at the University of Manchester, where he met his future wife, and ending up as an economics professor at the Hong Kong Baptist University, teaching Intermediate Microeconomics and Macroeconomics, the Chinese Economy, and Money and Finance in China.

Tsang also got involved in the politics of Hong Kong's future in the early 1980s during the Sino-British negotiations. He was founding member of the Meeting Point, the first local organisation to openly support the return of the territory to China after 1997. He wrote many books on the future of Hong Kong and became the influential mentor of the student and social activists at the time. He gradually became more conservative as the Sino-British negotiation was finalised. When the Meeting Point led by Anthony Cheung supported Chris Patten's controversial electoral reform in 1993 which was strongly opposed by Beijing, he and Lau Nai-keung quit the party.

He was specialised in Currency Board Economics, Chinese Economic Development, Transition Economics, Monetary Integration, Competition Policy. He was also employed as an economist at the Standard Chartered Bank in the midst of the currency crisis of 1983. He had also been appointed to many public posts including the Consumer Council and Energy Advisory Committee. He had been member of the Currency Board Sub-Committee under the Exchange Fund Advisory Committee of the Hong Kong Monetary Authority for 14 years. In 2013, he was appointed member of the Competition Commission after the competition law was passed in 2012.

He died at his home suddenly on 16 August 2014 at aged 64.
