= Kam Ping (constituency) =

Constituency in the Eastern District, Hong Kong

- Elected constituency for the Eastern District Council
- Boundary of Kam Ping in Eastern District
- District: Eastern
- Legislative Council constituency: Hong Kong Island East
- Population: 16,085 (2019)
- Electorate: 9,304 (2019)

Current constituency
- Created: 1994
- Number of members: One
- Member: Vacant
- Created from: North Point East; North Point South

Kam Ping
- Traditional Chinese: 錦屏
- Simplified Chinese: 锦屏
Transcriptions
Standard Mandarin
- Hanyu Pinyin: Jǐnpíng
Yue: Cantonese
- Yale Romanization: Gám bíng
- Jyutping: Gam2 bing2

Kam Ping (Chinese: 錦屏) is one of the 35 constituencies in the Eastern District, Hong Kong. The constituency returns one district councillor to the Eastern District Council, with an election every four years.

Kam Ping constituency is loosely based on the area in North Point nearby the Kam Ping Street with large presence of Hokkien population of an estimated population of 16,085.

== Councillors represented ==
Election	Member	Party	%
1994	Keung Yuk-deoil	Independent	69.29
1996 by-election	Tsang On-kei	Independent	51.44
1999	Choy So-yuk	Progressive Alliance→DAB	N/A
2003	Choy So-yuk	DAB	44.53
2007	Choy So-yuk	DAB	75.20
2011	Choy So-yuk	DAB	N/A
2015	Choy So-yuk	DAB	N/A
2019	Lee Yue-shun	Civic→Independent	50.70

== Election results ==
=== 2010s ===
Eastern District Council Election, 2019: Kam Ping
Party	Candidate	Votes	%	±%
Civic	Lee Yue-shun	3,113	50.70	
DAB	Hung Chi-kit	3,027	49.30	
Majority		86	1.40	
Turnout		6,179	66.42	
Civic gain from DAB		Swing		

Eastern District Council Election, 2015: Kam Ping
Party	Candidate	Votes	%	±%
DAB	Choy So-yuk	Uncontested		
DAB hold		Swing		

Eastern District Council Election, 2011: Kam Ping
Party	Candidate	Votes	%	±%
DAB	Choy So-yuk	Uncontested		
DAB hold		Swing		

=== 2000s ===
Eastern District Council Election, 2007: Kam Ping
Party	Candidate	Votes	%	±%
DAB	Choy So-yuk	1,804	75.2	+30.7
Independent	Chiang Yu-tui	595	24.8	
DAB hold		Swing		

Eastern District Council Election, 2003: Kam Ping
Party	Candidate	Votes	%	±%
DAB	Choy So-yuk	1,433	44.5	
April Fifth Action	Leung Kwok-hung	1,149	35.7	
Independent	Wong Sing-kwong	636	19.8	
DAB hold		Swing		

=== 1990s ===
Eastern District Council Election, 1999: Kam Ping
Party	Candidate	Votes	%	±%
HKPA	Choy So-yuk	Uncontested		
HKPA gain from Independent		Swing		

Kam Ping by-election 1996
Party	Candidate	Votes	%	±%
Independent	Tsang On-kei	1,431	51.1	
Democratic	Leung Suk-ching	778	27.8	
Liberal	Shek Kwei-chun	573	20.5	−9.7
Independent gain from Independent		Swing		

Eastern District Board Election, 1994: Kam Ping
Party	Candidate	Votes	%	±%
Independent	Keung Yuk-deoil	1,805	68.2	
Liberal	Shek Kwei-chun	800	30.2	
Independent win (new seat)				
