= Ng Chung-yin =

Ng Chung-yin (Chinese: 吳仲賢; 1946 – 21 April 1994) was a Hong Kong Trotskyist activist. He made his fame in the student strike at the Chu Hai College in 1969 and became an influential figure in the 1960s and 70s student movements. He was the founder of the Revolutionary Marxist League, a Trotskyist revolutionary vanguard party in 1973. He also work in the media industry in the 1980s and 90s until he died of cancer in 1994.

== Biography ==
Ng was born in Shantou, Guangdong in 1946. He followed his mother to migrate illegally to Hong Kong through Macao to reunite with his father in 1953 and was educated at the S.K.H. All Saints' Middle School. In 1965, he attended Chu Hai College to study Civil Engineering but later transferred to Mathematics.

Ng first participated in social activism in 1969, when he protested the college for manipulating the student union. He organised a school strike which was later called "Chu Hai Incident", which opened up the waves of student movements in the 1970s. In 1970, he co-founded Seventies Biweekly magazine with Mok Chiu-yu which became influential in the social activist circle where he earned his reputation as a political, literary and cultural figure. He was involved in organising the Chinese Language Movement, Defend the Diaoyu Island movements and anti-corruption campaigns among the other youth movements in the 1970s.

In 1972, he went to the Netherlands and then to Paris with fellow anarchists including John Shum. He met with the exiled Chinese Trotskyists including Peng Shuzhi in Paris and switched to Trotskyism by joining the Fourth International upon his return to Hong Kong. In 1973, he founded the Revolutionary Marxist League, a Trotskyist revolutionary vanguard party and published Combat Bulletin. They aligned themselves with the International Majority Tendency of the United Secretariat. In 1975 it became the Chinese section of the Fourth International, together with another long-existing Trotskyist group the Revolutionary Communist Party. In 1980, he organised a labour strike at the MTR construction site against the unfair treatment of the Japanese company and was fired afterward.

In 1981, Ng went to China after the suppression of the Beijing Spring in 1979 to gather information on Chinese political activists. After spending three weeks in Beijing, he was arrested by unidentified plain-clothesmen on the way to Shanghai. He was questioned about contacts with activists and foreign journalists. Although not being tortured, he was reportedly subjected to psychological pressure. He was pressured into making further contacts with dissidents and reporting back about them. Later he was allowed out to do similar work among political activists in Hong Kong. He left and returned to China once, but did not actually cooperate, delivering innocuous materials instead. He said this was to allow time to warn dissidents in China. He was expelled from the party due to the incident which ended his political career.

In the 1980s he worked in journalism, writing for Hong Kong Economic Journal, Sing Tao Evening News and also helped founding the Chinese version of Playboy and Capital magazine. In 1989, he founded the Children's Daily, Hong Kong Herald. He played an instrument role in the formation of the Hong Kong Alliance in Support of Patriotic Democratic Movements in China during the Tiananmen protests of 1989.

He migrated to Australia in 1990. In 1992, he was hired as a consultant for the Cable TV Hong Kong of the Wharf Holdings. He kept on commenting political affairs in Hong Kong and China and returned to Hong Kong for medical treatment after he was diagnosed with cancer.

== Personal life and legacy ==
Ng married Ip Lai-yung, a colleague from the Tak Ching Night School in 1977. The couple had three children, of which two of them were twins. He died of cancer on 21 April 1994.

His life was adopted into a play called The Life and Times of Ng Chung Yin, which was later made into a documentary film called The Life and Times of Wu Zhong Xiang by Evans Chan in 2002.

== See also ==
- Socialism in Hong Kong
