= Choy So-yuk =

Hong Kong politician

Choy So-yuk JP

Member of Eastern District Council
- In office 1 January 2000 – 31 December 2019
- Preceded by: Chiang Yu-tui
- Succeeded by: Lee Yue-shun
- Constituency: Kam Ping

Member of the Provisional Legislative Council
- In office 8 July 1997 – 30 June 1998
- Preceded by: Maria Tam
- In office 1 July 1998 – 30 September 2000
- Constituency: Election Committee

Member of the Legislative Council
- In office 1 October 2000 – 30 September 2008
- Succeeded by: Cyd Ho
- Constituency: Hong Kong Island

Personal details
- Born: 10 October 1950 (age 75) Jinjiang, Fujian, China
- Party: Democratic Alliance for the Betterment and Progress of Hong Kong
- Other political affiliations: Hong Kong Progressive Alliance
- Education: University of Hong Kong

Choy So-yuk
- Chinese: 蔡素玉
Transcriptions
Standard Mandarin
- Hanyu Pinyin: Caì Sùyù
Yue: Cantonese
- Yale Romanization: Choi Sou-yuhk
- Jyutping: Coi^{3} Sou^{3}-juk^{6}
Southern Min
- Hokkien POJ: Chhoà Sò͘-gio̍k

Choy So-yuk, BBS, JP (Chinese: 蔡素玉, born 10 October 1950) is a Hong Kong politician. She was an elected member of Eastern District Council and a Hong Kong Deputy of the National People’s Congress. From 1997 to 2008 she was a member of the Legislative Council of Hong Kong and its forerunner. Choy is a member of the Democratic Alliance for the Betterment and Progress of Hong Kong (DAB) and her main supporters are pro-Beijing politicians and organisations, especially the Fujianese in North Point on Hong Kong Island.

== Early life and education ==
Choy was born in Jinjiang, Fujian, China. Her family migrated to Hong Kong when she was very young. She holds a Bachelor of Science degree in Chemistry and a Master of Philosophy in Chemistry, both from the University of Hong Kong (1974 and 1980 respectively).

== Political career ==
Choy joined the Provisional Legislative Council in 1997, replacing Maria Tam upon the Handover from British to Chinese rule and went on to sit in subsequent Legislative Councils until 2008, representing the Hong Kong Island geographical constituency. She was a member of the (pro-business, pro-Beijing) Hong Kong Progressive Alliance, but ran (and won) for the DAB for the 2000 Legislative Council Election, as part of a joint election strategy by the two parties, made possible through the agreement of the influential Fujian community leaders in the district, who are loyal to her. Her former party anyway merged into the DAB in 2005.

Her Legislative Council positions included chairman of the Panel on Environmental Affairs, chairman of the Panel on Home Affairs, and member of the Panel on Development.

In the 2008 Legco election, Choy was placed second to Jasper Tsang on the DAB list for the Hong Kong Island constituency. Choy's loss of her seat was reportedly because the party's vote was split with Regina Ip, who was the candidate endorsed by the DAB in the 2007 Hong Kong Island by-election.

Since 2000, she has been a member of Eastern District Council, representing Kam Ping constituency. In the 2003 election, she almost lost out to Leung Kwok-hung ("Long Hair"), as part of the fallout from widespread public dissatisfaction with incumbent pro-government representatives across the board, while in the 2007 election she successfully saw off a challenge by fellow government supporter and Fujian elder Charles Chiang Yu-tui, winning 75 percent of the vote. In other elections for the seat, she has been unopposed. She stepped down in 2019, and her successor was defeated in 2019 by the candidate from the Civil Party.

In 2008, Choy was appointed a Hong Kong Deputy of the National People’s Congress and is therefore an ex officio member of the Election Committee.

Other public positions held by Choy, currently or previously, include: member of the Fujian Provincial Committee of the Chinese People’s Political Consultative Conference, member of the Appeal Panel of the Travel Industry Council of Hong Kong and director of Fujian Middle School.

== Support for environmental issues ==
Choy is an ardent supporter of environmental issues. She notably broke ranks with her party to vote with conservationists for the preservation of Queen's Pier. She joined democrats to oppose application for HK$50 million to fund the dismantling and relocating of the pier on 9 May 2007. Choy, however, abstained in a re-submitted request for funds to dismantle and relocate Queen's Pier two weeks later. She revealed that she had been lobbied by Michael Suen and Donald Tsang; party whips did not allow her to cast an opposing vote, and the government won by 10–7.

== Business interests ==
Choy is a non-executive director of Ping Shan Tea Group, an investment holding company listed in Hong Kong. Formerly Huafeng Group, a textiles company, it was acquired in 2013 by China Natural Tea Holdings Company Limited, in a reverse takeover. The company was renamed to Ping Shan Tea Group Limited, and Choy's position remains unchanged.

She is also an independent non-executive Director of Evershine Group Holdings Limited, and of Loudong General Nice Resources (China) Holdings Limited, as well as the founder and managing director of Oriental-Western Promotions Ltd (formerly SHK International Ltd).

Legislative Council of Hong Kong
Preceded by Maria Tam	Member of Provisional Legislative Council; 1997–1998	Replaced by Legislative Council
New parliament	Member of Legislative Council; Representative for Election Committee; 1998–2000	Seat abolished
New seat	Member of Legislative Council; Representative for Hong Kong Island; 2000–2008	Succeeded by Jasper Tsang
Political offices
Preceded by Tsang On-kei	Member of Eastern District Council; Representative for Kam Ping; 2000–2019	Succeeded by Lee Yue-shun
