= Leung Kwok-hung =

Hong Kong politician and activist (born 1956)

- 梁國雄
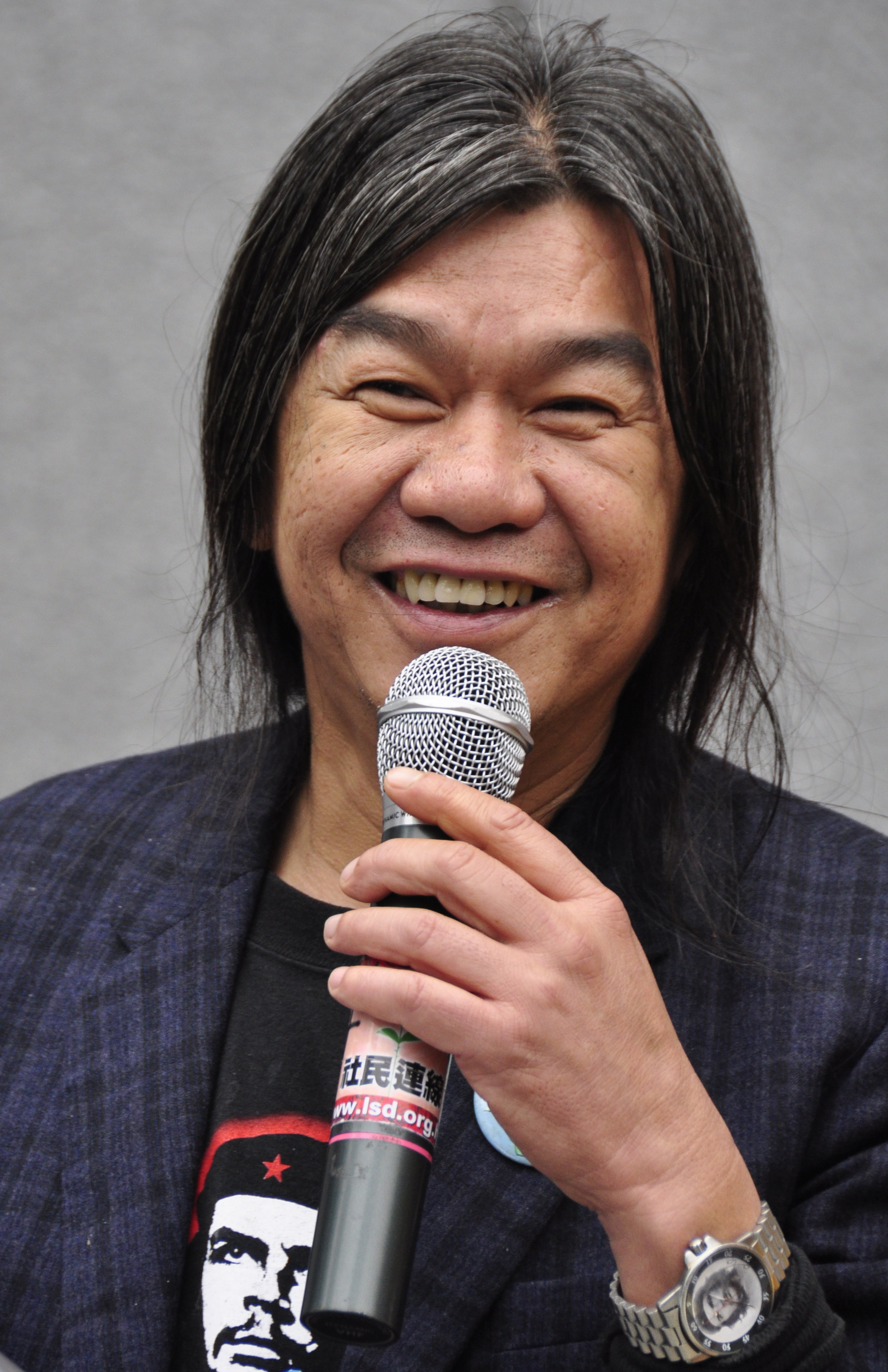
- Leung in 2012

Member of the Legislative Council
- In office 17 May 2010 – 14 July 2017 (Note: Leung served as member of the Legislative Council until 14 July 2017 when his oath on 12 October 2016 was invalidated and his seat was vacated according to the ruling of the Court of First Instance.)
- Preceded by: Himself
- Constituency: New Territories East
- In office 1 October 2004 – 29 January 2010
- Preceded by: Andrew Wong
- Succeeded by: Himself
- Constituency: New Territories East

Chairman of the League of Social Democrats
- In office 12 February 2012 – 21 February 2016
- Preceded by: Andrew To
- Succeeded by: Avery Ng

Personal details
- Born: 27 March 1956 (age 70) Shau Kei Wan, Hong Kong
- Party: April Fifth Action (since 1991); League of Social Democrats (2006–2025)
- Other political affiliations: Revolutionary Marxist League (1975–1991)
- Spouse: Chan Po-ying (m. 2021)
- Education: Clementi Secondary School
- Occupation: Politician

Leung Kwok-hung
- Traditional Chinese: 梁國雄
- Simplified Chinese: 梁国雄
Transcriptions
Standard Mandarin
- Hanyu Pinyin: Liáng Guóxióng
Hakka
- Romanization: Liòng Kuet-hiùng
Yue: Cantonese
- Yale Romanization: Lèuhng Gwok-hùhng
- Jyutping: Loeng^{4} Gwok^{3}hung^{4}
- IPA: [lœ̏ːŋ kʷɔ̄ːk hʊ̏ŋ]

Nickname
- Traditional Chinese: 長毛
- Simplified Chinese: 长毛
- Literal meaning: long hair
Transcriptions
Standard Mandarin
- Hanyu Pinyin: cháng máo
Yue: Cantonese
- Yale Romanization: chèuhng mòuh
- Jyutping: coeng4 mou4

Leung Kwok-hung (Chinese: 梁國雄; born 27 March 1956), also known by his nickname "Long Hair" (長毛), is a Hong Kong politician and social activist. He was a member of the Legislative Council, representing the New Territories East. A Trotskyist in his youth, he was a founding member of the Revolutionary Marxist League. He became a political icon with his long hair and Che Guevara T-shirt in the protests before he was elected to the Legislative Council in 2004. In 2006, he co-founded a social democratic party, the League of Social Democrats (LSD) of which he was the chairman from 2012 to 2016.

In 2017, he announced his candidacy for the 2017 Chief Executive election, through unofficial public petition, but withdrew after failing to receive enough signatures. On 14 July 2017, Leung was disqualified by the court over his manner on oath of office at the inaugural meeting of the Legislative Council on 12 October 2016 as a result of the oath-taking controversy.

== Early life and social activism ==
Leung was born on 27 March 1956 in Hong Kong to a family from Guangdong Province. Born in Shau Kei Wan, he later moved into Chai Wan Estate. He was raised in a single family after his father left home when Leung was six-years-old, while his mother was an amah in a British family to support the family and Leung had to live with relatives back in Shau Kei Wan who had seven children.

Leung was educated at the Clementi Secondary School. Leung credits his political awakening to the Cultural Revolution and the 1967 Hong Kong riots, participating in the "Maoist student movement". He and his mother were members of the Hong Kong Federation of Trade Unions (HKFTU), the left-wing pro-communist labour union at the time. After the falls of Lin Biao and the Gang of Four which crushed the Maoist idealism, Leung reflected his political belief, and delved himself into Trotskyism under the influence of the social activist icons at that time such as Ng Chung-yin.

In 1975, he co-founded the Revolutionary Marxist League, a Trotskyist vanguard party, in which he became active in political actions. He was arrested multiple times, including in the protests of supporting the 1976 April Fifth Tiananmen Incident and Chinese democracy movement. His first prosecution was in 1979 when he protested for the Yau Ma Tei boat people. Later in the same year he was charged and jailed for a month for "unlawful assembly" for a protest at the Victoria Park.

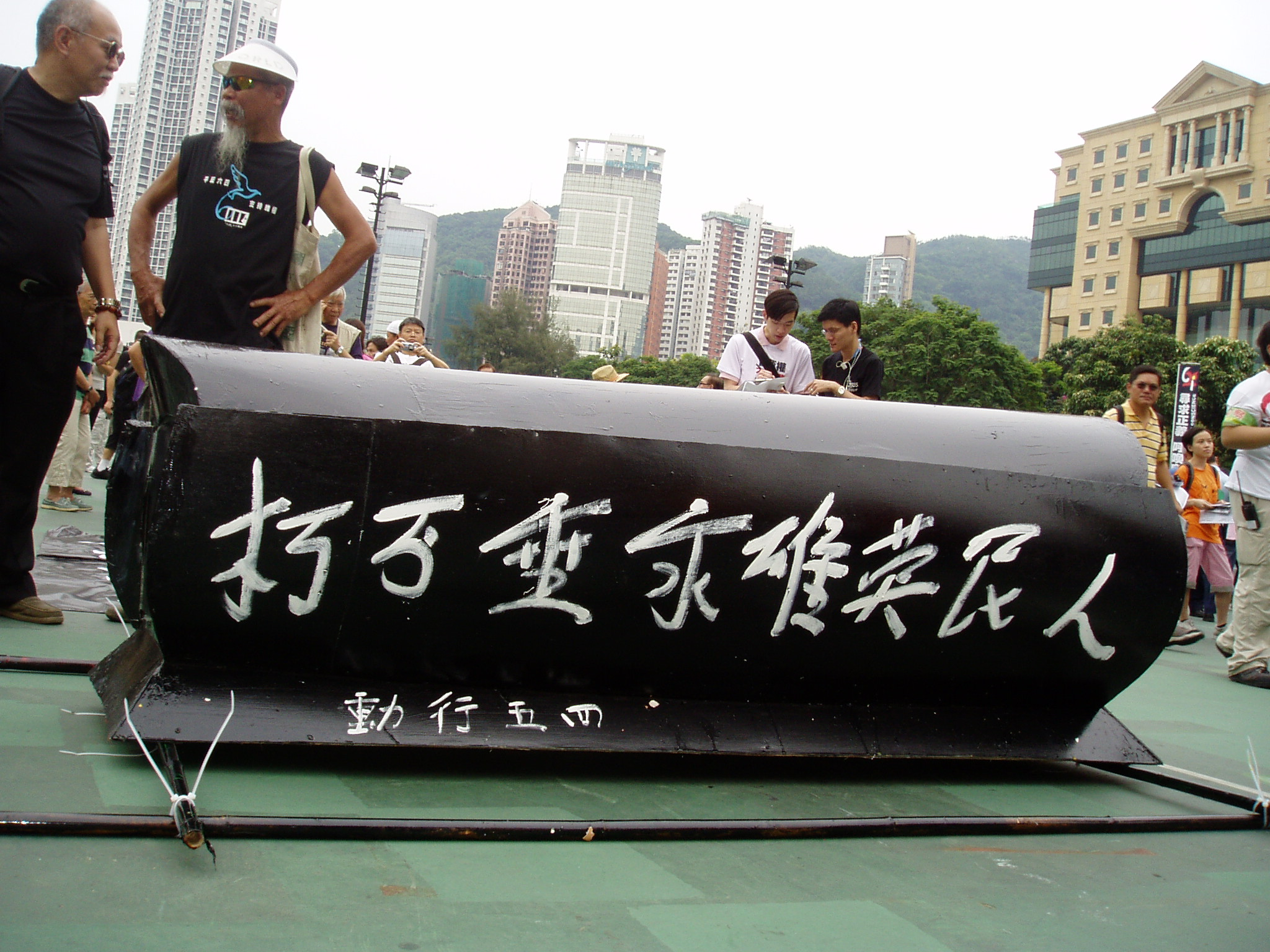
Members of the April Fifth Action in Victoria Park, Hong Kong in 2009 to commemorate the victims in the 1989 Tiananmen massacre

After his release, he worked as a construction worker from 1981 to 1986. In 1986, Leung worked for Kowloon Motor Bus as an overnight vehicle cleaner. Around 1988, he formed the April Fifth Action after the Revolutionary Marxist League was disbanded. The group is well known for its aggressive and civil disobedience-style actions to protest against the governments of China and Hong Kong during celebrations and visits of state leaders, often resulting in confrontations with the Hong Kong police. They usually carry a coffin as their trademark protest prop. Leung supported the 1989 Tiananmen Square protests and was a member of the Hong Kong Alliance in Support of Patriotic Democratic Movements in China.

He has been briefly jailed several times for offences such as shouting from Legislative Council of Hong Kong (LegCo) public viewing gallery, burning the national flag of the People's Republic of China and forcibly breaking into an opposition political event. In 2000, he and Koo Sze-yiu were prosecuted for disrupting a LegCo meeting and were later jailed for 14 days, becoming the first dissents to be jailed after the handover of Hong Kong in 1997. Before that he had been charged 14 times, of which 11 ended in convictions.

== Legislative Council bids and founding of LSD ==
Leung first contested in the Legislative Council election in 2000, where he ran in the New Territories East. He received 18,235 votes, about six percent of the total vote share and was not elected. On 1 July 2003, protests against the National Security (Legislative Provisions) Bill 2003 that had been proposed by the unpopular Tung Chee-hwa administration attracted more than 500,000 people marching in the streets. The further antagonism towards the government helped further boost the popularity of pro-democracy activists including Leung Kwok-hung. In the 2003 District Council election, Leung challenged the pro-Beijing Democratic Alliance for the Betterment of Hong Kong (DAB) legislator Choy So-yuk's seat in the Kam Ping constituency which was seen as pro-Beijing traditional stronghold. He called out the DAB as the "loyalist party" and received 1,149, only 284 short to defeat Choy.

Leung ran again in the Legislative Council election in 2004 in New Territories East and succeeded in winning a seat in LegCo with 60,925 votes at the expense of the moderate Andrew Wong, former Legislative Council President, He received over 200% increase in votes compared to the 18,235 votes in 2000. His campaigns include universal suffrage, workers' rights and welfare for the less well off. His political agenda include introduction of a liveable minimum wage, comprehensive social security, collective bargaining and taxing speculative business. Although he expresses his fondness for Che Guevara and the ideals of revolutionary Marxism, Leung has not included a proletarian revolution agenda on his election platform and many of his ideas and proposals would be readily accepted by most mainstream social liberal and social democratic parties in other countries.

For the swearing-in ceremony of the Hong Kong Legislative Council on 6 October 2004, Leung's fellow members arrived in business attire. He, in contrast, wore a T-shirt with Tiananmen Square on the front and Che Guevara on the back. When he was called to come forward and take the oath, he raised his left fist, encircled with a black wristband, a memorial to those who died in the 1989 protests. He had planned to alter his oath of office, but a Hong Kong judge said such a step would make it impossible for him to serve. Instead, Leung added his own messages to the standard oath, demanding vindication for those killed in the 1989 Tiananmen Square crackdown, calling for the release of political prisoners and an end to one-party rule on the Mainland. He shouted at the ceremony: "Long live democracy! Long live the people!" He was then sworn in as a council member. Observers watched closely the reaction from the PRC government, as Leung's statements touched upon a politically sensitive issue that is considered taboo in official public settings. Leung's populist and unorthodox confrontational style contrasts with the usually restrained atmosphere of LegCo. Rita Fan, the then LegCo President, seemed more concerned by Leung's attire for LegCo meetings than any of his political opinions. One legislator commented that "LegCo has to get used to Leung, and he has to get used to LegCo."

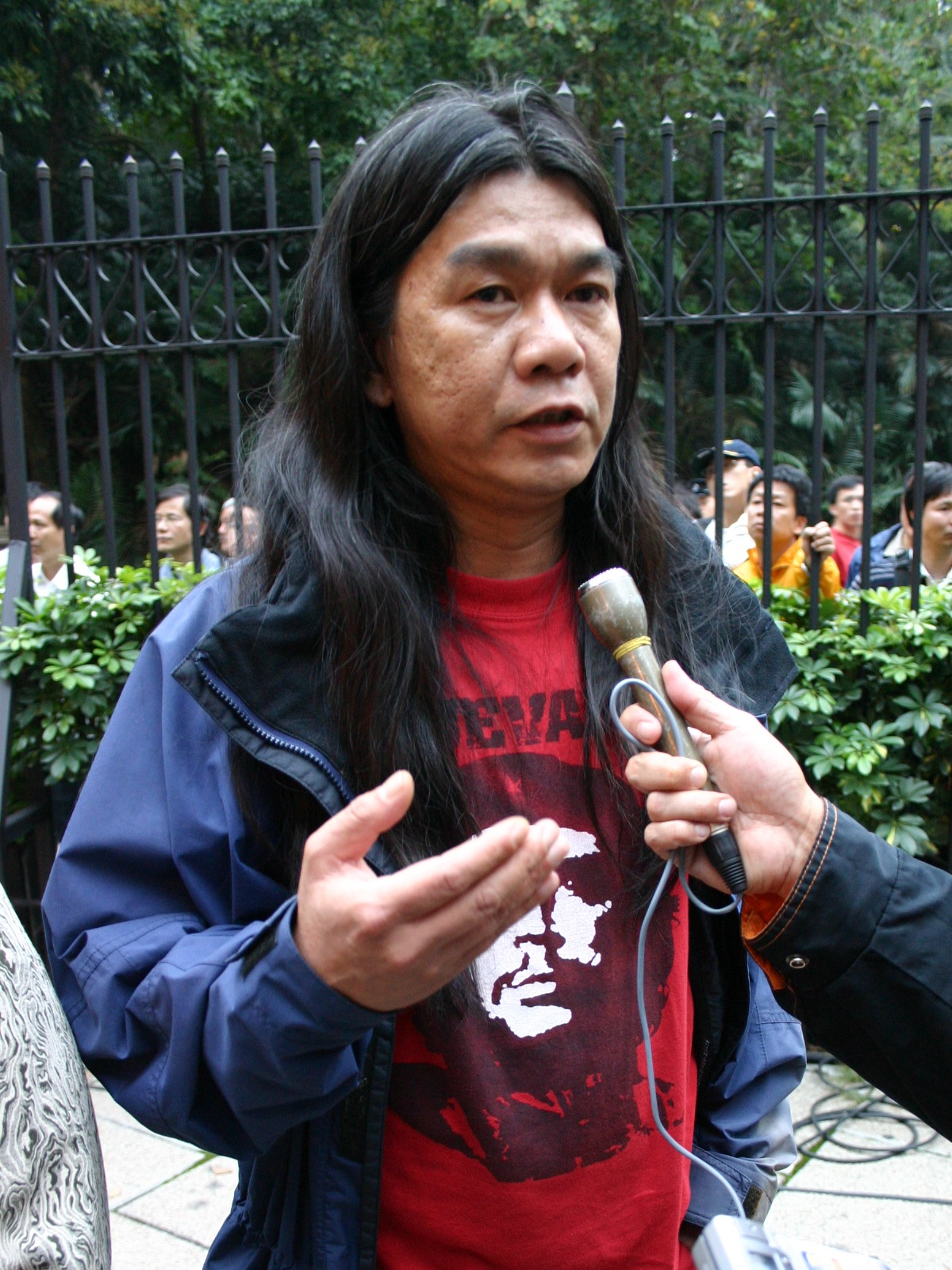
Leung in his iconic Che Guevara T-shirt in 2005

In 2005, Leung took part in the protests against the WTO Conference in Hong Kong and was injured during the demonstration. Leung was arrested along with 900 other demonstrators. As with almost all other persons rounded up on that day, Leung was released shortly after and was not prosecuted.

In 2006, Leung co-founded the social democratic party League of Social Democrats (LSD) with legislator Albert Chan and radical pro-democrat radio host Wong Yuk-man. In the 2008 Legislative Council election, Leung was re-elected in the New Territories East while Chan and Wong were also elected in New Territories West and Kowloon West respectively which made the LSD in the third largest pro-democracy party after Democratic Party and Civic Party, which took a more moderate and pro-middle class position as compared to the LSD.

== Denied entry to Sichuan in 2008 ==
Leung has not had a Home Return Permit since 1989, after the Tiananmen Massacre, having been denied one by the Chinese authorities, but he was able to visit mainland China once in the company of his mother in about 2003. He was also able to visit mainland China in 2005, on an invitation to Hong Kong legislators, including pan-democrats, to visit Guangdong. Some of the other pan-democrat legislators also had not had an individual permit since 1989.

On 4 July 2008 Leung was scheduled to visit areas in Sichuan damaged by the Sichuan earthquake as part of a 20-member delegation. Leung's travel permit application was rejected at the last minute on suspicions he would protest in China during the three-day trip. Sichuan officials claimed to have seen Internet reports saying Leung planned to do something not relevant to the purpose of the trip. Rita Fan confirmed those were the grounds of denial. Leung responded saying: "It's so ironic. People said the Olympic Games will make China more open up. I think it's going backward."

== Five Constituencies Referendum ==
In 2010, Leung and four other pro-democrat legislators launched the "Five Constituencies Referendum" to press the government to implement universal suffrage of the Chief Executive and Legislative Council by resigning from each constituency and trigger a territory-wide by-election. Leung explained that his resignation in January was, "in keeping with [his] campaign promise... to fight for direct elections." Although being elected in May with 108,927 votes, the campaign failed to draw high turnout rate due to the boycott by the pro-Beijing camp, . Leung accused the Democratic Party for not participating in the campaign and instead reached a controversial agreement with the Beijing government over the reform proposal.

In the 2011 District Council elections, LSD chairman Andrew To's refusal of fielding candidates against the Democrats led former chairman Wong Yuk-man and legislator Albert Chan to quit the party with hundreds party members over the disagreement as well as the intra-party factional struggles. Leung, being the only legislator left in the party refused to follow Wong and Chan. Leung subsequently took over as party chairman after To resigned when he lost his seat in the District Council elections. Leung himself also ran in the election against DAB legislator Ip Kwok-him in his stronghold Kwun Lung but lost with a wide margin of 1,800 votes.

After the 2010 by-election, the government considered the resignations were abusive to the system and planned to plug the loophole. A Legislative Council (Amendment) Bill 2012 was proposed to disqualify a resigned member of the Legislative Council from participating in a subsequent by-election. Leung participated in the filibustering against the bill with Albert Chan and Wong Yuk-man, submitting 1,306 amendments altogether, which began the radical democrats' filibustering practice against the government bills in the following years. On morning of 17 May 2012, LegCo President Jasper Tsang, adopted Article 92 of the Standing Order, which allows the president follow foreign parliament rules for unregulated behaviours to terminate the debate. In the end, all amendments were defeated and the Bill was passed on 1 June 2012.

== Third term as Legislative Councillor ==
In the 2012 Legislative Council election, with 48,295 votes, among the highest votes in the constituency. In 2013, he and other radical pan-democrats started filibustering by moving a total of 710 amendments on the Budget Appropriation Bill debate, to press for a universal pension scheme and a HK$10,000 cash handout. The government warned that the service would shut down if the budget bill do not pass. LegCo President Jasper Tsang ordered to end the filibuster on 13 May after 55 hours spent to debate 17 of the 148 amendments. The Appropriation Bill was passed on 21 May 2013 with 684 amendments negatived.

Leung opposed the government's constitutional package on the 2016/2017 Legislative Council and Chief Executive elections. After the National People's Congress Standing Committee (NPCSC) set the restrictive framework on the Chief Executive candidates, the student activist groups organised a week-long student strike. On 26 September 2014 toward the end of the strike, 100 protesters led by student leader Joshua Wong rushed into the square of the government headquarters. The police clearance drew thousands of protesters at the scene. In the next morning, the Occupy Central with Love and Peace led by scholar Benny Tai announced their early launch of the planned occupy protests. Feeling being highjacked, some protesters began to leave the scene, while Leung Kwok-hung dropped to his knees in front of the protesters, asking them for staying in the scene. "If you want to achieve a goal in the long term – in this case, true democracy in Hong Kong – you need to unify all powers who are fighting for this goal and establish a platform to let them all participate", he later told the press. For his long term experiences in protests, he became one of the leaders in the 2014 Hong Kong protests and kept being seen in the scene, but he was criticised by some militant radicals for his non-violence doctrine.

In May 2015, Leung was barred from entering Malaysia along with Joshua Wong on grounds that their presence in the country would damage Malaysia's ties with China. Leung condemned the Malaysian government and accused it of violating his basic rights.

In 2016 Legislative Council election Leung was once again re-elected with 35,595 votes. Leung came in ninth in the nine-seat constituency, with only 1,051 votes separating him from the unelected Christine Fong due to the infighting among the pan-democracy camp and surges of many localist candidates with more radical agenda.

== Oath-taking controversy and disqualification ==
At the inaugural meeting of the 6th Legislative Council on 12 October, he took the oath-taking ceremony as his protest platform like his previous oaths. He wore a black T-shirt with the word "civil disobedience" in Chinese and held an opened yellow umbrella symbolising the Umbrella Revolution with many words thereon, including "ending the one-party rule", and a paper board showing the words "NPC 831 decision" and a cross on it. He paused many times while reading the oath and tore a piece of paper with the words "NPC 831 decision". His oath was validated by the clerk.

However, after the oaths of the two localist legislators Sixtus Leung and Yau Wai-ching of Youngspiration were invalidated by the clerk, the duo were unprecedentedly legally challenged by Chief Executive Leung Chun-ying and Secretary for Justice Rimsky Yuen. On 7 November 2016, the National People's Congress Standing Committee (NPCSC) interpreted of the Article 104 of the Basic Law of Hong Kong, standardising the manners of the oath-taking when taking public office. As a result, the duo were disqualified by the court. Subsequently, the government launched a second legal action against Leung and three other pro-democracy legislators, Lau Siu-lai, Yiu Chung-yim and Nathan Law, which resulted in their disqualifications from the Legislative Council on 14 July 2017.

== 2017 Chief Executive bid ==
Leung Kwok-hung launched his Chief Executive bid in February 2017 through a "public nomination" mechanism conducted by post-Occupy group Citizens United in Action, in which he would seek to secure 37,790 votes from members of the public, one per cent of the city's registered voters before he would canvass for the nominations from the Election Committee. He explained his decision was to urge the pro-democrat electors not to vote for any pro-establishment candidates who could not represent the pro-democracy camp at all even if they see them as "lesser evils", as some pro-democrats had inclined to support John Tsang, the relatively liberal pro-establishment candidate to prevent a hardliner Carrie Lam from winning. He also aimed to reflect the spirit of the 2014 Umbrella Movement and the voice of those low-income people. His bid was supported by four radical democrat legislators People Power's Raymond Chan, Demosisto's Nathan Law, Lau Siu-lai and Eddie Chu, while the mainstream pro-democrats cast doubt over Leung's candidacy, believing it would contribute to the victory to Carrie Lam.

On 25 February, Leung announced he would not run for the Chief Executive, as he only secured 20,234 nominations from the general public, about 17,000 fewer than the threshold. Among the 20,234 nominations, 13,440 were collected in public while the rest of them online. Leung stated that he being able to collect more than 20,000 nominations with personal contact information and identity card numbers had proved that "civil nomination" is achievable.

== Arrests, attack, and criminal convictions ==
Until the end of 2024, Leung accumulated 25 convictions, some of which were for unauthorized assembly.

On 18 April 2020, Leung was arrested as one of 15 Hong Kong high-profile democracy figures, on suspicion of organizing, publicizing or taking part in several unauthorized assemblies between August and October 2019 in the course of the anti-extradition bill protests. Following protocol, the police statement did not disclose the names of the accused. A day prior to his arrest, he was stabbed with a sharp object while demonstrating in solidarity with pro-democracy legislator Dennis Kwok, who had been strongly criticized by the pro-Beijing camp. The attack happened in front of the Liaison Office and he was helped by fellow activist Raphael Wong before being moved to a hospital, where he was later discharged at his own request. In September 2020, the 81-year-old man who stabbed him went on trial for the attack and was controversially praised by the magistrate for "loving society". The elderly man was also quoted as saying he wanted activists Joshua Wong and Ted Hui "to die as soon as possible", and included Leung in the same wish. He was sentenced in October 2020 to a prison term of three months and six days.

In August 2020, Leung was among a large group of pro-democracy figures charged for the banned vigil commemorating the 31st anniversary of the 1989 Tiananmen Square protests.

On 6 September 2020, he was arrested when protesting the postponement of the 2020 Hong Kong Legislative Council election. On 15 September 2020 he appeared before the court for the banned Tiananmen anniversary gathering where he criticized the Chinese Communist Party. On 8 December 2020, Leung was arrested again for "unauthorised assembly" during the July 1 protest of that year and was released on bail pending a court appearance. His party condemned his arrest.

=== Arrest under National Security Law ===
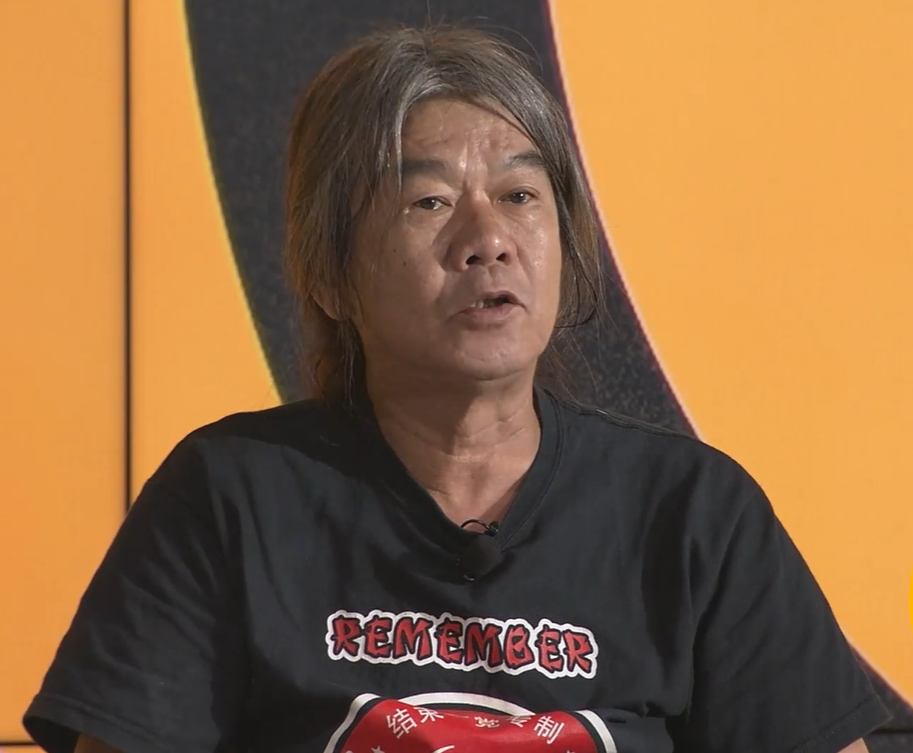
Leung speaking at the 2020 pro-democracy primary debates

On 6 January 2021, Leung was arrested along with more than 50 other pan-democrats, accused of violating the national security law over their participation in the pro-democracy primaries of 2020. He was accused of "subverting state power." Leung was released on bail on 7 January.

On 28 February 2021, Leung was formally charged, along with 46 others, with subversion and was arrested again. On 4 March, he was denied bail and he remained in prison. On 12 March, Leung was again denied bail citing national security risks. On 29 March 2021, the High Court denied him bail again and he will remain in custody until the next hearing on the case on 31 May 2021.

On 13 May 2021, High Court judge Esther Toh, upheld her decision to deny bail to Leung alleging his determinate opposition to the government and the national security law. Toh also argued that Leung had foreign and international support if released and that he was at high risk of reoffending.

On 5 September 2022, Leung pleaded not-guilty to subversion charges.

On 30 May 2024, Leung was found guilty of conspiracy to commit subversion.

On 19 November 2024, Leung was sentenced to six years and nine months in prison.

=== Convictions ===
On 16 April 2021, Leung was found guilty of taking part in unauthorised assembly and was sentenced to 18 months' imprisonment.

On 24 May 2021, Leung pleaded guilty over another unauthorised assembly in 2019 which turned violent. Leung was defiant during the mitigation hearing in court and said that however he pleaded guilty, he believed he had done nothing wrong. On 28 May 2021, Leung was sentenced to an additional 18 months' imprisonment over the 2019 unauthorised assembly.

On 16 October 2021, Leung was sentenced to further eight months' imprisonment over un unauthorised assembly in July 2020, in a protest against the national security law.

In March 2022, an additional sentence of two weeks in prison was added to Leung's overall sentence, after he was convicted of contempt during his time at LegCo.

In July 2022, Leung and seven other activists, appealed his conviction for violating COVID-19 restrictions during Labour Day in 2020, citing "disproportionate" measures from the government. On 18 October 2022, the appeal was rejected by a court.

=== Health in prison ===
In early May 2022, Leung's wife said that Leung had been frequently visiting hospital from prison due to a heart condition, but dismissed rumors that Leung was seriously ill with COVID-19. Leung's wife also said that his mental health had "upheavals".

== Image and sartorial preference ==
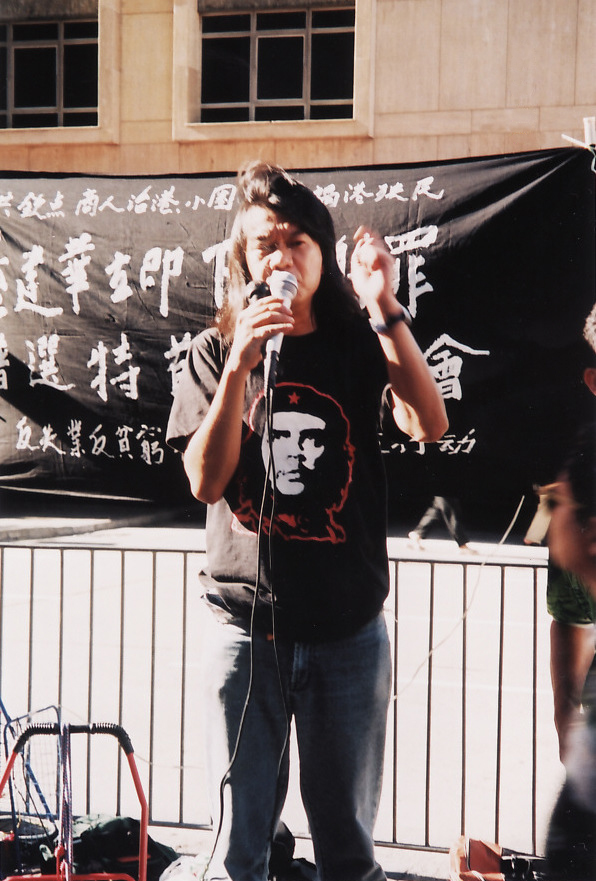
Leung speaking at a protest in 2003

Leung is widely referred to by the sobriquet "Long Hair" (長毛), and press photographs show him with long locks as early as 1977. In 2020, he won a court case and avoided a compulsory haircut as the Court of Final Appeal ruled that compulsory haircuts for male prisoners amounted to sexual discrimination, and thereby overturned a lower court's decision in 2018. Leung has several other nicknames including "Mr Kwoktastic", "Kwok It Up" and "The Kwokmaster".

Leung is reputed to have vowed not to cut his hair until the government of the People's Republic of China apologised for the Tiananmen Square massacre although he has denied this on several occasions.

Leung is a smoker and can often be seen sporting a T-shirt with the iconic likeness of his favoured Che Guevara and smoking a cigarette. He is a fan of the Homeless World Cup and has accompanied Hong Kong's team to the tournament for several years.

He says he learned English by listening to the British Forces Broadcasting Service radio station.

== Personal life ==
Leung is married to fellow activist and deputy secretary-general of the League of Social Democrats Chan Po-ying. The couple wed in January 2021, after 45 years together, anticipating Leung's re-arrest and conviction under the National Security Law, and alert to the greater prison visiting rights of spouses.

== See also ==
- Hong Kong new year marches
- List of Chinese pro-democracy activists

== Notes ==
Legislative Council of Hong Kong
Preceded by Andrew Wong	Member of Legislative Council; Representative for New Territories East; 2004–2017	Vacant
Party political offices
Preceded by Andrew To	Chairman of League of Social Democrats; 2012–2016	Succeeded by Avery Ng
Preceded by Raphael Wong	Vice Chairman of League of Social Democrats; 2020–2021	Succeeded by Dickson Chau
