= Chen Zhi (sinologist) =

Chinese researcher

- Born: 1964 (age 61–62); Beijing, China

Chinese name
- Traditional Chinese: 陳致
- Simplified Chinese: 陈致
Transcriptions
Standard Mandarin
- Hanyu Pinyin: Chén Zhì
Yue: Cantonese
- Jyutping: can4 zi3

Chen Zhi (simplified Chinese: 陈致; traditional Chinese: 陳致; born 1964) is a Chinese scholar and researcher in classical Chinese Studies, the President of Beijing Normal–Hong Kong Baptist University, Fellow of the Hong Kong Academy of the Humanities (HKAH), and Director of the Jao Tsung-I Academy of Sinology (JAS) at Hong Kong Baptist University.

== Life and career ==
Chen was born in 1964 in Beijing. In 1981, he was admitted to Peking University and graduated with a B.A. in history in 1985. After graduation, he received an M.Phil. in Chinese Literature from Nanjing University in 1988 and a Ph.D. in Chinese Studies from the University of Wisconsin–Madison in 1999. He received an MLE from Harvard University in 2012.

Chen Zhi is a scholar recognized for his contributions to Chinese Studies, with a focus on a variety of areas such as classical studies, early Chinese culture and history, historical writings, traditional Chinese poetry, and excavated documents: bronze inscriptions and bamboo and silk writings. He has also explored the intellectual history of the Ming and Qing dynasties.

Chen has made a mark as the founding editor-in-chief of several academic journals and book series, both in Chinese and English. His research has been published in the US, Europe, the UK, Japan, and the Greater China Regions. Outside of his research, Chen has held many administrative roles in universities.

Chen's university administration has spanned several institutions in Hong Kong and mainland China. From 2009 to 2014, he served as the local convenor of Chinese Language and Literature in the Panel of Humanities of RAE, while also holding leadership posts at Hong Kong Baptist University: he was Head of the Department of Chinese from 2010 to 2013 and founded and directed the Mr. Simon Suen and Mrs. Mary Suen Sino-Human Institute from 2011 to 2014. He was the Founding Acting Director of the Jao Tsung-I Academy of Sinology from 2012 to 2014, after which he became its Director, and from 2015 to 2017 he was the Acting Dean of the Faculty of Arts at Hong Kong Baptist University.

In 2018, Chen joined Beijing Normal University-Hong Kong Baptist University United International College (UIC) as Vice President (Academic), later advancing to Provost in 2020, and in the same year he joined the Board of Directors at Wuhan College. He served as President at Hong Kong Chu Hai College from 2022 to 2024. Chen became the third President of Beijing Normal-Hong Kong Baptist University (BNBU) in April 2024.

== Bibliography ==
=== Books ===
- Chen Zhi. The Legacy of Odes, Documents, Ritual Music: A Self-Selected Anthology of Chen Zhi (詩書禮樂中的傳統：陳致自選集). Shanghai: Shanghai Renmin Publishing House, 2012. Pp. 422.
- Chen Zhi. Interview with Yu Ying-shih (余英時訪談錄). Beijing: Zhonghua Shuju, 2012. Pp. 224; Hong Kong: Chung Hwa Book Company (Hong Kong) Limited, 2012. Pp. 244; Taipei: Linking Publishing (Lien-ching), 2012. Pp. 328.
- Chen Zhi, ed. Selected Papers on Early China by Contemporary Sinologists (當代西方漢學研究集萃．上古史卷). Shanghai: Shanghai Guji Publishing House, 2012. Pp. 422.
- Chen Zhi. From Ritualization to Secularization: The Shaping of Book of Songs. Sankt Augustin, Germany: Monumenta Serica Institute, 2007. Pp.380. - Chinese version: 陳致著；吳仰湘、許景昭、黃梓勇譯，《從禮儀化到世俗化：詩經的形成》 (英譯中)，上海：上海古籍出版社，2009年。共363頁。 - Japanese version: 陳致著；湯浅邦弘監訳；湯城吉信，古賀芳枝，草野友子，中村未来訳，《詩經の形成》，東方書店，2023年6月。
- Chen Zhi. Chief Editor. A Dictionary of the Literary Allusions in Chinese Classical Poetry (中國古代詩詞典故辭典). Beijing: Yanshan Publishing House, 1991. Pp. 820.

=== Translations ===
- Chen Zhi and William H. Nienhauser, Jr., trans. “Hereditary House of T’ai-po of Wu” (Chinese-English) with comprehensive annotations. In The Grand Scribe’s Records, vol. V.1: The Hereditary Houses of Pre-Han China, Part I, edited by William H. Nienhauser Jr., 1–30. Bloomington: Indiana University Press, 2006.
- Chen Zhi et al., trans. Making America: The Society and Culture of the United States (美國特性探索：社會與文化). Beijing: China Social Sciences Publishing House, 1992. (Translated the “Preface,” “Introduction,” “From Immigration to Acculturation” by Arthur Mann, “Civil Disobedience in American Political Thought” by John P. Diggins, and “American Philosophy” by Moray Murphey from English into Chinese.)
- Chen Zhi et al., trans. Lectures on Systems Philosophy (系統哲學講演集) by Ervin Laszlo. Beijing: China Social Sciences Publishing House, 1991. (Translated “Cybernetics in an Evolving Social System toward an Evolutionary Philosophy,” “Ψ-universe: the Farther Horizon,” and “The Objective of Mankind” from English to Chinese.)
