= Hong Kong Chu Hai College =

Private college in New Territories, Hong Kong

Coordinates: 22.3754°N 113.9871°E

Hong Kong Chu Hai College 香港珠海學院
- Type: Private
- Established: 1947 (as Chu Hai University in Guangzhou); 1949 (as Chu Hai College); 2004 (as Chu Hai College of Higher Education); 2022 (as Hong Kong Chu Hai College)
- President: Jane Zhang (interim)
- Academic staff: 79 (2012/13)
- Students: 824 (2017/18)
- Location: Tuen Mun, Hong Kong, China
- Website: www.chuhai.edu.hk

Chinese name
- Traditional Chinese: 香港珠海學院
- Simplified Chinese: 香港珠海学院
- Cantonese Yale: Jyūhói hohk'yún
Transcriptions
Standard Mandarin
- Hanyu Pinyin: Zhūhǎi Xuéyuàn
Yue: Cantonese
- Yale Romanization: Jyūhói hohk'yún
- Jyutping: Zyu1hoi2 hok6jyun2

Hong Kong Chu Hai College is a private degree-granting institute in Tuen Mun, New Territories, Hong Kong. At present, Chu Hai College is recognised as an Approved Post Secondary College under the Post Secondary Colleges Ordinance (Cap 320).

== History ==
The college can be traced back to Chu Hai University (私立珠海大學) in Guangzhou, China in 1947. The private university was founded by a group of prominent educators, financiers, and legislators of the Republic of China including Chen Jitan, Huang Lunshu, Li Yangjin, Wen Fangpu, and Kong Mou Sum. After Guangzhou was taken over by the Chinese Communist Party during the Chinese Civil War in 1949, the college relocated to Hong Kong. The institution was forced to rename itself Chu Hai College (珠海書院) as it was not recognised as a university under Hong Kong law.

For years, it maintained very close ties with the Republic of China (ROC) government, as many of the colleges' founders and subsequent senior staff were former officials or legislators in the pre-1949 Mainland ROC government. It was registered in the ROC's Ministry of Education as Chu Hai University (珠海大學) and was authorised to award degrees on behalf of the ROC's Ministry of Education. Especially in the beginning, it enjoyed status and recognition similar to that of universities in Taiwan as it was originated by Taiwan Staff and Professors and was funded by Taiwan to teach students in Hong Kong. It had a similar status to a private school and tuition was considered high when it first began. Later, the college also received annual grants from the ROC and acted as the agent for administrating Taiwanese university entrance examinations for Hong Kong students wishing to pursue tertiary education in the Republic of China.

In the 1990s, the Taiwanese localisation movement and the subsequent change in policy led to its being increasingly distanced from the ROC in Taiwan. In response, the college began to re-establish itself, in part by associating actively with other overseas universities and in part by a series of self-strengthening actions, including seeking to award its own degrees. In May 2004, the Hong Kong SAR government officially recognised the college's programmes and in October, it was approved to award its own degrees by Hong Kong's Chief executive, Tung Chee-hwa.

With the approval of Hong Kong SAR government, it became an "Approved Post Secondary College" in July 2004 was renamed Chu Hai College of Higher Education (珠海學院). On the same day, the college was removed from the register of the ROC's Ministry of Education in accordance with Hong Kong ordinances and ROC laws. Its grants from the ROC were withdrawn by the Legislative Yuan in 2003. New students are no longer awarded degrees equivalent in rights to those of universities in Taiwan, while Taiwanese university entrance examinations for Hong Kong students have since then been organised directly by Taiwan's National Chi Nan University.

The institution renamed itself Hong Kong Chu Hai College (香港珠海學院) in November 2022 and approved by the Hong Kong SAR government in December 2022.

As of 2024, the current interim president is Jane Zhang. Previously the president was Chen Zhi.

== Campus ==
After moving to Hong Kong, the college utilised the building of the Dai Tong Secondary School (大同中學) in Mongkok as its campus. However, the secondary school was later closed and the college was forced to move to Tsuen Wan.

In 2009, the college announced that it was planning to build its own purpose-built campus, for the first time in its history. Funding was provided partially by The College Land Grant and Start-up Loan, administered by the Education Bureau of the Hong Kong government. Among the other contributors to this project was the Hong Kong Jockey Club, which announced that it was donating HK$200 million towards the construction. The new campus located in east Castle Peak Bay, Tuen Mun, opened in August 2016.

== Recognition ==
At present, Chu Hai College of Higher Education is one of the 17 institutions able to issue bachelor's degrees in Hong Kong. Hong Kong Chu Hai College partnered with the British Broadcasting Corporation to produce a glossary of English-Chinese financial market terminology.

== See also ==
- List of mainland Chinese schools reopened in Hong Kong
