= April Fifth Action =

April Fifth Action 四五行動
- Convenor: Leung Kwok-hung
- Founded: 1988; 38 years ago
- Ideology: Socialism (HK)
- Political position: Left-wing
- Regional affiliation: Pro-democracy camp
- Colours: Red and black
- Legislative Council: 0 / 90
- District Councils: 0 / 470

Website
- april5action.blogspot.hk

April Fifth Action
- Traditional Chinese: 四五行動
Transcriptions
Yue: Cantonese
- Yale Romanization: Sei ńgh hàhng duhng
- Jyutping: Sei3 ng5 hang4 dung6

April Fifth Action (Chinese: 四五行動) is a Hong Kong left-wing group named after the first Tiananmen incident of 5 April 1976. While the organization's Chinese name translates as "April Fifth Action", English-language media in Hong Kong usually refer to it as the April Fifth Action Group (AFAG).

== Beliefs ==
The April Fifth Action Group was formed on the basis of the Trotskyite vanguard party Revolutionary Marxist League which was disbanded in 1990. Legislative Council members "Longhair" Leung Kwok-hung and Leung Yiu-chung were the founding members of the April Fifth Action Group.

The group believes that without a democratic China, it would be impossible to have a democratic Hong Kong. The group is aligned with the pro-democracy camp in its opposition to the governments of China and the HKSAR.

The group calls for universal suffrage in Hong Kong, opposes unemployment and poverty, eliminates pro-government parties, terminates one-party dictatorship in China, sets up unemployment benefits and minimum wage and strives for the right to hold plebiscites in Hong Kong. It also calls for release of all dissidents in mainland China and accountability for the Tiananmen massacre of 1989.

== Protests ==
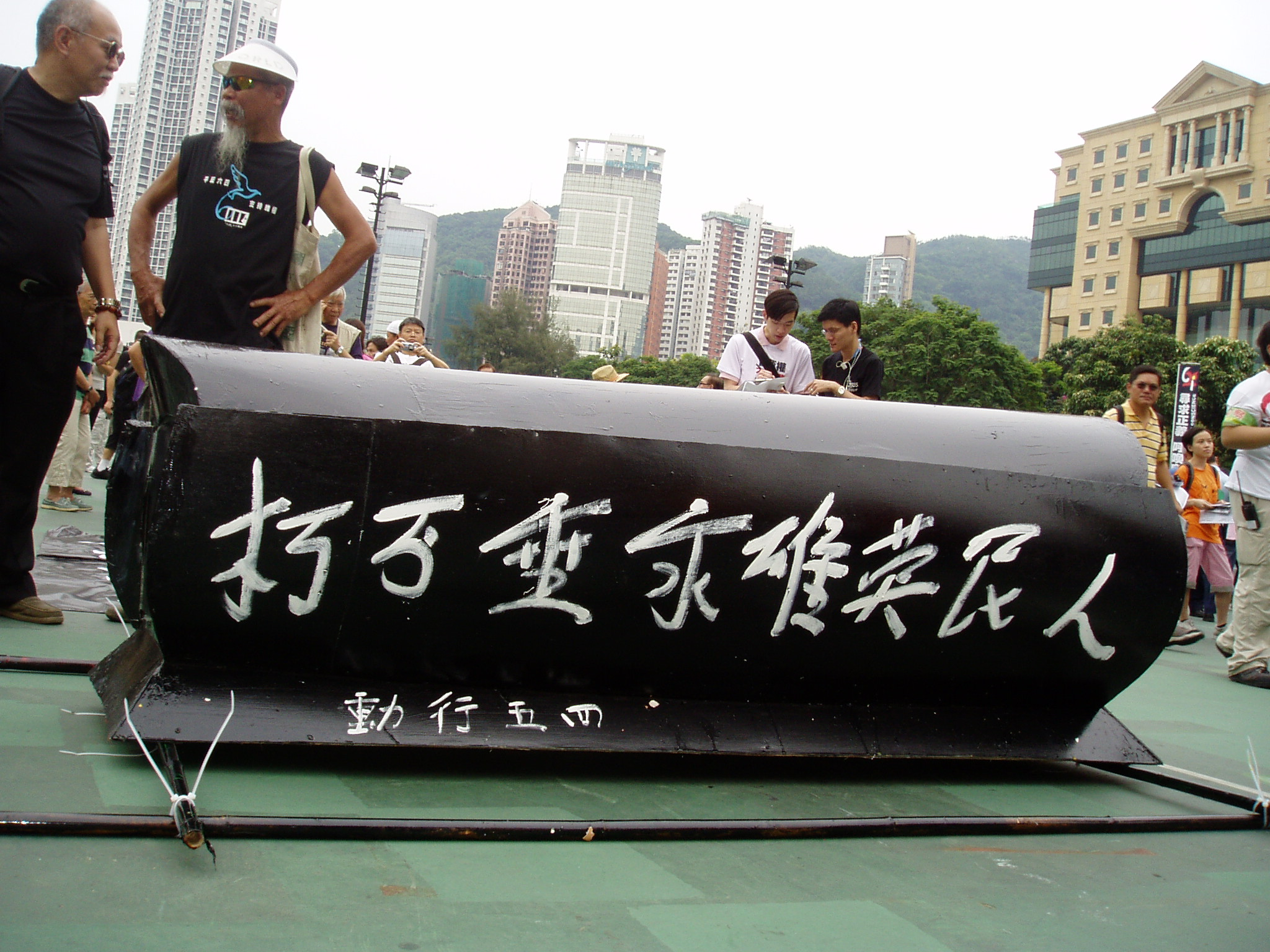
Members of the April Fifth Action Group in Victoria Park, Hong Kong in 2009 to commemorate the victims in the 1989 Tiananmen massacre.

The group is well known for its aggressive and civil disobedience-style actions to protest against the governments of China and Hong Kong during celebrations and visits of state leaders, often resulting in confrontations with the Hong Kong police. They usually carry a coffin as their trademark protest prop. Its members have also been prosecuted for disrupting meetings of the Legislative Council of Hong Kong (LegCo).

The group was one of the major supporters of the Tiananmen Square protest of 1989 in Hong Kong. Its members went to the New China News Agency Hong Kong branch demanding the PRC government open dialogue with students on democratic reform and rule of law in late April. It condemned the bloody suppression of the protest. The members were prosecuted with the Summer Offences Ordinance after their demonstrations outside a reception hosted by the New China News Agency on 29 September 1989 to mark the National Day of the People's Republic of China. That raised concern that the British administration might be using out-of-date and repressive colonial laws for the political appeasing the People's Republic of China government after Beijing accusations that the British Hong Kong administration was allowing Hong Kong to be used as a base for subversion of the People's Republic of China.

In a protest on 1 June 1997 just a month before the handover of Hong Kong which drew a crowd of 5,000 people in Hong Kong going from Chater Garden to the New China News Agency. The group was blocked off by the Hong Kong police, and did not succeed in presenting a petition to the news office. While the event led Hong Kong news headlines, China's main CCTV station promoted the opposite propaganda on the mainland by featuring children in Wan Chai waiving PRC flags. Critics have questioned the effectiveness of the group, since Beijing has continued to censor news of the group's activities entirely in the mainland.

== Elections ==
The group's most famous member, Leung Kwok-hung, unsuccessfully contested both the 2000 LegCo election and 2003 District Council elections. He considered the latter battle a victory because of the number of votes he got in the Kam Ping constituency which traditionally supports pro-Beijing candidates. He finally succeeded in the 2004 LegCo election and became the first member of the April Fifth Action in the Legislative Council. His election was widely viewed as a protest vote against the unpopular administration of then Chief Executive Tung Chee-hwa.

Leung attracted controversy by refusing to take the standard oath required for all legislators, instead reciting his own expanded version. Leung Kwok-hung gained most of his voter popularity owing to his relatively radical stance on various issues, criticising the indecision and inefficiency that paralysed the Hong Kong government due to weak leadership under Tung Chee-hwa. Leung was re-elected with an increased majority in 2008 under the League of Social Democrats banner, becoming the candidate with the most votes in his constituency.

== Electoral performance ==
=== Legislative Council elections ===
Election	Number of popular votes	% of popular votes	GC seats	FC seats	EC seats	Total seats	+/−	Position
2000	18,235▲	1.38▲	0	0	0	0 / 60	0	N/A
2004	60,925▼	3.44▼	1	0		1 / 60	1▲	4th▲
2008	LSD ticket		1	0		1 / 60	0	N/A
2012	LSD ticket		1	0		1 / 60	0	N/A
2016	LSD ticket		1	0		1 / 60	0	N/A
